= Hatoyama =

Hatoyama (written: 鳩山, lit. dove mountain) may refer to:

== People with the surname ==
- Hatoyama family, a prominent Japanese political family
  - Kazuo Hatoyama (1856–1911), academic and politician
  - Haruko Hatoyama (1861–1938), educator and political matriarch
  - Ichirō Hatoyama (1883–1959), politician and Prime Minister of Japan
  - Hideo Hatoyama (1884–1946), Japanese jurist
  - Kaoru Hatoyama (1888–1982), educator, administrator, and wife of Prime Minister Ichirō Hatoyama
  - Iichirō Hatoyama (1918–1993), politician and diplomat
  - Yasuko Hatoyama (1922–2013), wife of Iichirō, and mother of Kazuko, Yukio and Kunio
  - Yukio Hatoyama (born 1947), politician and Prime Minister of Japan
  - Kunio Hatoyama (1948–2016), politician
  - Emily Hatoyama (born 1955), Japanese actor and model

== Other uses ==
- Hatoyama, Saitama (鳩山町; -machi), a town in Japan

== See also ==
- Liberal Party–Hatoyama, a former Japanese political party
