= Kazuo Hatoyama =

Japanese politician

- 鳩山 和夫
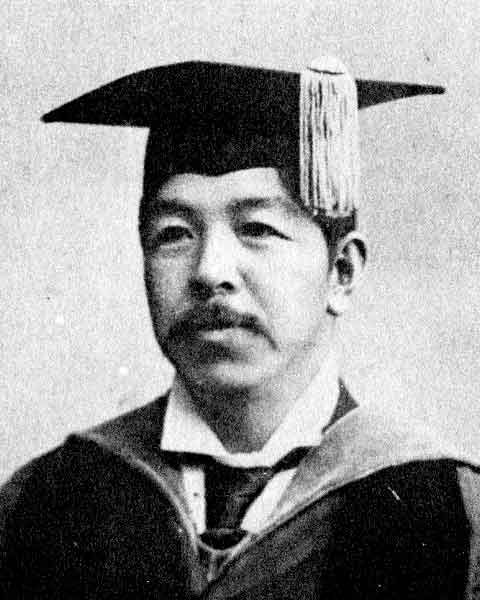

Speaker of the House of Representatives
- In office 22 December 1896 – 25 December 1897
- Monarch: Meiji
- Deputy: Shimada Saburō
- Preceded by: Kusumoto Masataka
- Succeeded by: Kenkichi Kataoka

Member of the House of Representatives
- In office 15 February 1892 – 3 October 1911
- Preceded by: Yoshino Tsugutsune
- Succeeded by: Kazuo Kojima
- Constituency: Tokyo 9th (1894–1902); Tokyo City (1902–1911)

Member of the Tokyo City Assembly
- In office November 1908 – 3 October 1911

Personal details
- Born: 6 May 1856 Toranomon, Edo, Japan
- Died: 3 October 1911 (aged 55) Tokyo, Japan
- Party: Rikken Seiyukai (1908–1911)
- Other political affiliations: Rikken Kaishintō (1892–1896); Shimpotō (1896–1898); Kenseitō (1898–1900); Kensei Hontō (1898–1908)
- Spouse: Haruko Taga (m. 1881)
- Children: Ichiro; Hideo
- Relatives: Hatoyama family
- Education: Columbia University; Yale Law School

Kazuo Hatoyama (鳩山 和夫, Hatoyama Kazuo; 6 May 1856 – 3 October 1911) was a Japanese lawyer and politician who served as Speaker of the House of Representatives from 1896 to 1897. He was the patriarch of the prominent Hatoyama family, father of Prime Minister Ichiro Hatoyama, great-grandfather of Prime Minister Yukio Hatoyama.

== Early life and education ==
Hatoyama was born to a samurai family of the Katsuyama clan in present-day Minato, Tokyo.

He graduated from Tokyo Kaisei School in 1875. He was selected for a government-sponsored study abroad program and attended Columbia University (B.L., 1877) and Yale University Law School (M.L., 1878; D.C.L., 1880).

== Career ==
When he returned to Tokyo in 1880, Hatoyama opened a law practice, while lecturing at the University of Tokyo, which was formed in 1877 by merging his old school and two other institutions.

He thereafter joined the Rikken Kaishintō political party founded by Ōkuma Shigenobu and became active in politics. In 1890, at Okuma's urging, he was appointed president of the Tokyo Semmon Gakko, which later became Waseda University. He headed this institution until 1907, although his title was largely honorary in nature. In 1901, he was invited to Yale for its 200th anniversary celebration, and awarded an honorary doctorate in law.

He was elected to the House of Representatives in the 1892 general election and was re-elected eight times thereafter. He became House Speaker in 1896. However, a rift developed between Hatoyama and Okuma. Although Hatoyama angled to become foreign minister in Okuma's first cabinet, he was passed over for the post and only served as Vice Minister in 1898. In April 1907, he was removed from his post at Waseda and demoted to board member status. He left the Rikken Kaishinto in January 1908 to join the rival Rikken Seiyukai party.

He was elected to the Tokyo City Assembly in 1908. In 1910, he was elected President of the Tokyo Bar Association.

== Family ==
His wife, Haruko Hatoyama, was a co-founder of what is known today as Kyoritsu Women's University. His son is former Prime Minister Ichirō Hatoyama, who founded and was the first president of the Liberal Democratic Party (LDP). His grandson was former Foreign Minister Iichirō Hatoyama. His younger great-grandson Kunio Hatoyama served as Minister of Internal Affairs and Communications under Prime Minister Taro Aso until June 12, 2009. His older great-grandson Yukio Hatoyama is the leader of the Democratic Party of Japan (DPJ) and represents the 9th district of Hokkaidō in the House of Representatives. Yukio became Prime Minister on September 16, 2009, following a win by the opposition coalition in the 2009 elections. His son-in-law was Suzuki Kisaburō, a judge, prosecutor, procurator and Minister of Justice and Home Minister.

=== Family tree ===
Hatoyama family tree

Haruko Hatoyama	Kazuo Hatoyama
Kaoru Hatoyama	Ichirō Hatoyama	Hideo Hatoyama
Yasuko Hatoyama	Iichirō Hatoyama
Kazuko Inoue	Miyuki Hatoyama	Yukio Hatoyama	Emily Hatoyama	Kunio Hatoyama
Kiichirō Hatoyama	Tarō Hatoyama	Jirō Hatoyama

== Residence ==
Hatoyama and his family resided in the Otowa neighborhood of Bunkyo, Tokyo in 1891. Following the Great Kanto Earthquake, his son Ichiro commissioned a new Western-style mansion on the site which is now known as Hatoyama Hall (鳩山会館 Hatoyama Kaikan).

== Notes ==
House of Representatives (Japan)
Preceded by Masataka Kusumoto	Speaker of the House of Representatives; 1896–1897	Succeeded by Kenkichi Kataoka
New district	Representative for Tokyo's Tokyo city district (multi-member); 1902–1911; Served alongside: Ukichi Taguchi, Soroku Ebara, numerous others	Succeeded by Masutarō Takagi...
Preceded by Tsugutsune Yoshino	Representative for Tokyo's 9th district 1892–1902	District eliminated
Government offices
Preceded by Jutarō Komura	Vice Minister for Foreign Affairs; 1898	Succeeded by Keiroku Tsuzuki
