= Hatoyama Hall =

House of Hatoyama family in Tokyo, Japan

Coordinates: 35.713822°N 139.731208°E

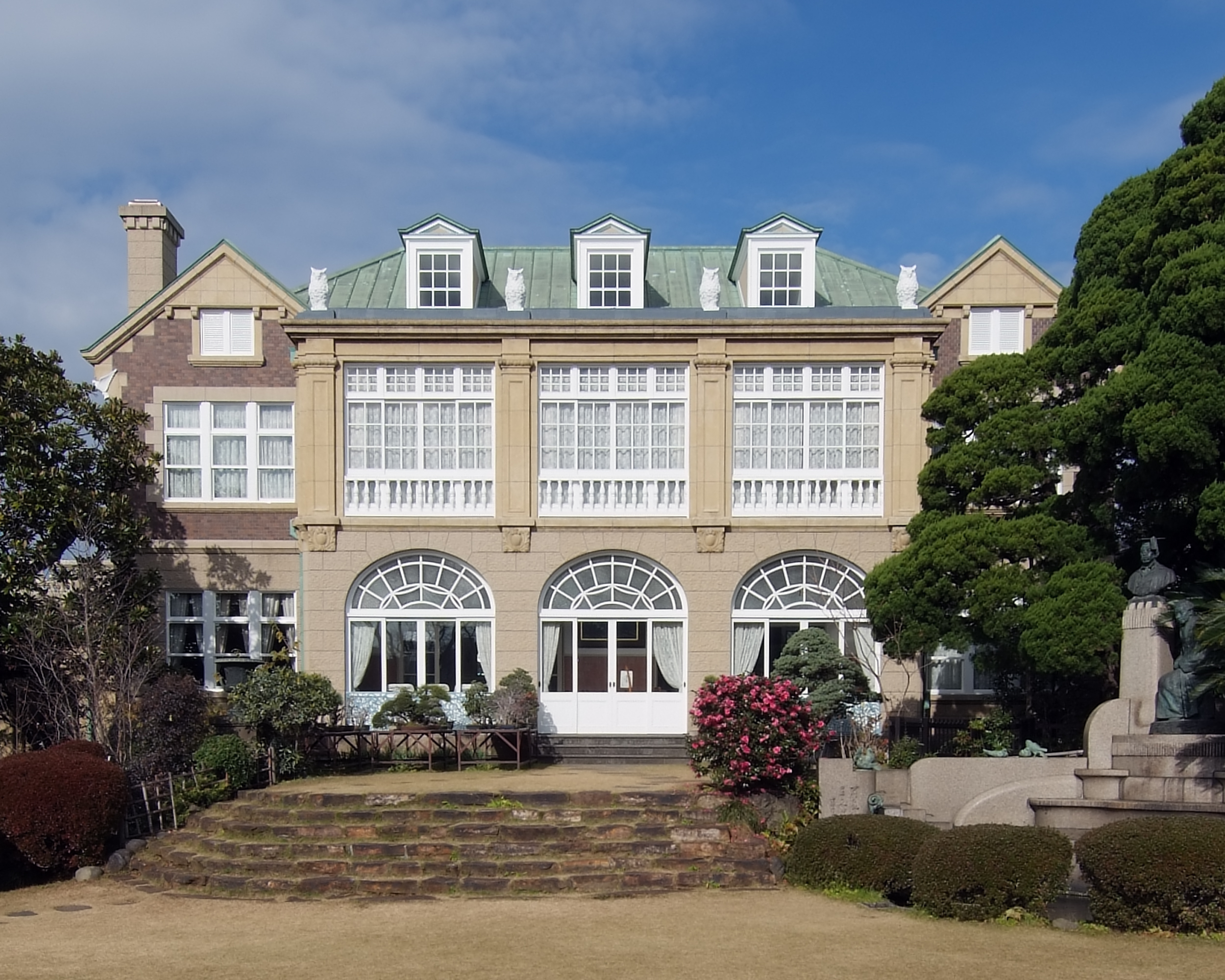
Hatoyama Hall viewed from the garden

Hatoyama Hall (鳩山会館, Hatoyama Kaikan), also known as the Otowa Palace (音羽御殿, Otowa Goten), is a Western-style residence in Bunkyō, Tokyo commissioned in 1924 by Ichirō Hatoyama, and it was here that he helped form the present Liberal Democratic Party. The house and gardens are in the process of evolving into a museum commemorating the Hatoyama family's contributions to politics and education in Japan.

The building's architect was Shinichirō Okada, who also designed the Kabuki-za. The facade is composed of three bays in natural stone, with large French windows on the ground floor. On the first floor, the windows and doors fill the entire width of the building; the doors open inwards and there are narrow, French-style balconies.

There are currently three memorial rooms open to the public, one dedicated to Ichiro, another to his wife Kaoru, and yet another to their son, Iichiro Hatoyama. In addition, the garden features sculptures of Kazuo Hatoyama and his wife, Haruko.

== Hatoyama public figures ==
The Hatoyamas have been active participants in Japanese public life, including:

=== 1st generation ===
- Kazuo Hatoyama (1856 – 1911): Vice-Foreign Minister, speaker of the House of Representatives of the Diet of Japan from 1896 – 1897, University of Tokyo professor, former principal of Waseda University (1890 – 1907), father of Ichirō Hatoyama, and great-grandfather of Yukio Hatoyama and Kunio Hatoyama.
- Haruko Hatoyama (1863 – 1938): Japanese educator, co-founder of what is today Kyoritsu Women's University, mother of Ichirō Hatoyama, and great-grandmother of Yukio Hatoyama and Kunio Hatoyama.

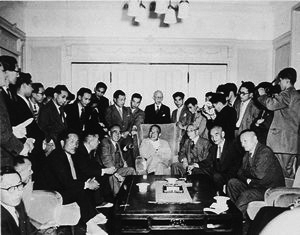
Prime Minister Ichirō Hatoyama (center) and the leaders of the ruling LDP, including Tanzan Ishibashi (to the left of Hatoyama) and Bukichi Miki (second to the right of Hatoyama), along with the press. The group photo was taken in the salon of the Otowa Mansion sometime during 1955.

=== 2nd generation ===
- Ichirō Hatoyama (1883 – 1959): Secretary of the Cabinet, Minister of Education and 52nd, 53rd and 54th Prime Minister of Japan, son of Kazuo and Haruko, father of Iichirō, and grandfather of Yukio Hatoyama and Kunio Hatayama.
- Kaoru Hatoyama (1888 – 1982): schoolmaster of Kyoritsu Women's University; wife of Ichirō, mother of Iichirō

=== 3rd generation ===
- Iichirō Hatoyama (1918 – 1993): Foreign Minister of Japan in 1976 – 1977, grandson of Kazuo and Haruko, eldest son of Ichirō Hatoyama and father of Yukio Hatoyama and Kunio Hatayama.
- Yasuko Hatoyama (1922 – 2013): wife of Iichirō, mother of Kazuko, Yukio and Kunio

=== 4th generation ===
- Yukio Hatoyama (1947 – ): Prime Minister of Japan, leader of the Democratic Party of Japan, great-grandson of Kazuo and Haruko, grandson of Ichirō and Kaoru, son of Iichirō and Yasuko, and older brother of Kunio.
- Miyuki Hatoyama (1943 – ), wife of Yukio.
- Kunio Hatoyama (1948 – 2016): Japanese politician, former Minister of Internal Affairs and Communications, (Liberal Democratic Party), former Minister of Education, Labour, and Justice, great-grandson of Kazuo and Haruko, grandson of Ichirō and Kaoru, son of Iichirō and Yasuko, and younger brother of Yukio.

=== 5th generation ===
- Tarō Hatoyama (1974 – ): Japanese politician, former member of the Tokyo Metropolitan Assembly and New Renaissance Party candidate in the 2010 Japanese House of Councillors election, great-great-grandson of Kazuo and Haruko, great-grandson of Ichirō and Kaoru, grandson of Iichirō, eldest son of Kunio and Emily, and nephew of Yukio.
