= List of official overseas trips made by Norodom Sihamoni =

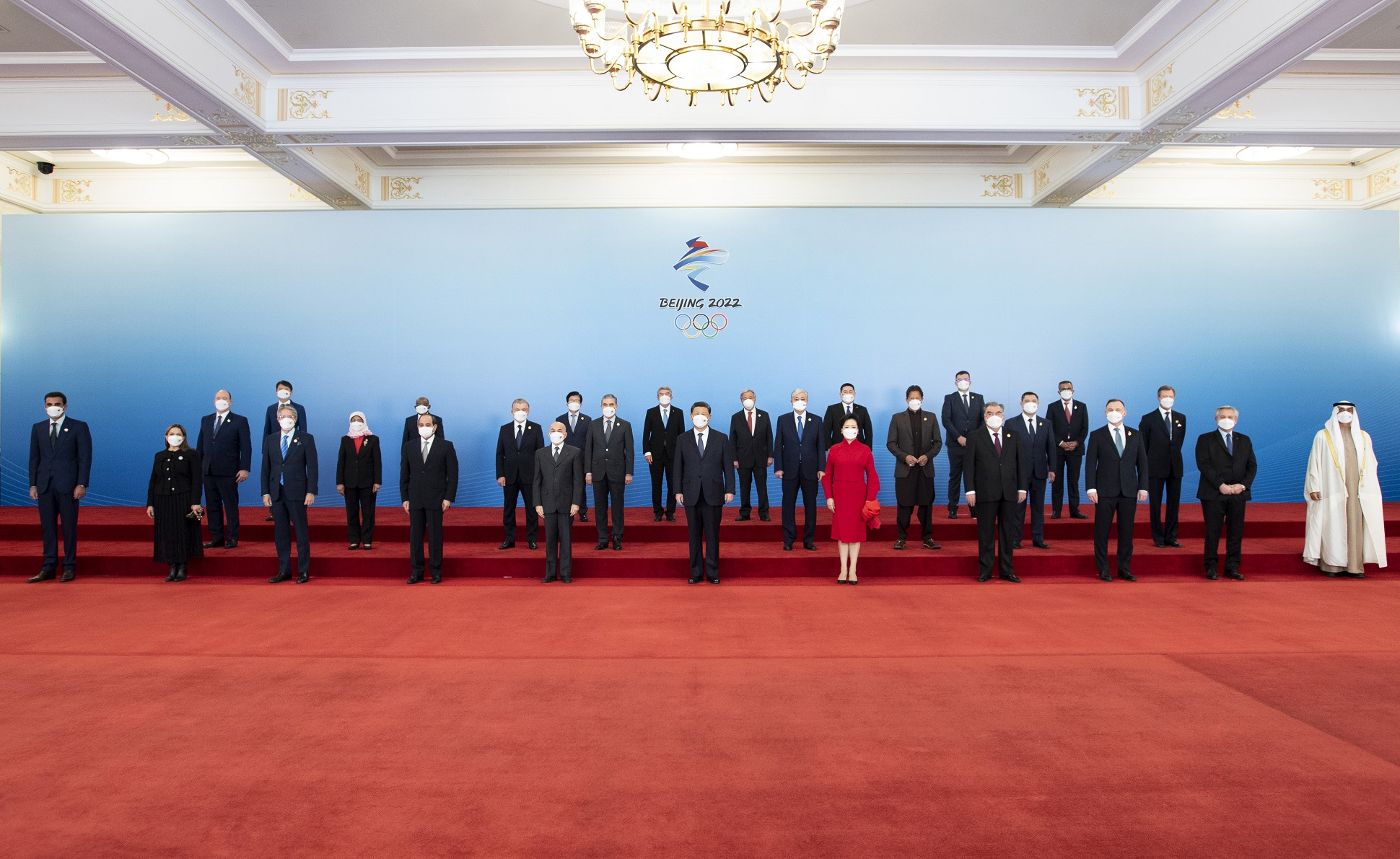
King Sihamoni is pictured fifth from left at the 2022 Winter Olympics leaders' 'family photo' in Beijing, China on 5 February

Since acceding to the throne of Cambodia in 2004, King Norodom Sihamoni has made numerous state and official visits.

== 2000s ==
=== 2004 ===
| Date | Country | City | Details | Host | Ref. |
|---|---|---|---|---|---|
| 18 October – 20 October | China | Beijing | Official visit with President Hu on 18 October, prior to King Sihamoni's coronation on 29 October | President Hu Jintao | |

=== 2005 ===
| Date | Country | City | Details | Host | Ref. |
|---|---|---|---|---|---|
| 10 August – 14 August | China | Beijing | State visit | President Hu Jintao | |

=== 2006 ===
| Date | Country | City | Details | Host | Ref. |
|---|---|---|---|---|---|
| 14 March – 15 March | Laos | Vientiane | State visit | President Khamtai Siphandon | |
| 16 March – 18 March | Vietnam | Hanoi | State visit | President Trần Đức Lương | |
| 27 March – 29 March | Malaysia | Kuala Lumpur | State visit | Yang di-Pertuan Agong Sirajuddin of Perlis | |
| 29 March – 31 March | Singapore | Singapore | State visit | President S. R. Nathan | |
| 17 April – 19 April | North Korea | Pyongyang | State visit | President of the Presidium of the Supreme People's Assembly Kim Yong-nam | |
| 11 June – 14 June | Thailand | Bangkok | Official visit to commemorate the 60th anniversary of King Bhumibol Adulyadej's accession to the throne, including royal banquet | King Bhumibol Adulyadej, Queen Sirikit | |
| 18 September – 24 September | Czech Republic | Prague | State Visit | President Václav Klaus | |
| 25 September – 26 September | Slovakia | Bratislava | State visit | President Ivan Gašparovič | |
| 20 November – 24 November | France | Paris | State visit | President Jacques Chirac | |
| 14 December | Germany | Bonn | Official visit | President Horst Köhler | |
| 24 – 27 December | China | He Fei, Chizhou | Official visit | Governor Wang Jinshan, Party Secretary Guo Jinlong | |

=== 2007 ===
| Date | Country | City | Details | Host | Ref. |
|---|---|---|---|---|---|
| 27 May – 1 June | Switzerland | Zürich, Bern | Private/ Official visit. Visits to Bern on 29 May, including official reception by President Calmy-Rey and to Zürich on 31 May | President Micheline Calmy-Rey | |
| 28 November – 12 December | China | Beijing | Routine visit | Non-applicable | |

=== 2008 ===
| Date | Country | City | Details | Host | Ref. |
|---|---|---|---|---|---|
| 24 March – 26 March | Brunei | Bandar Seri Begawan | State visit | Sultan Haji Hassanal Bolkiah | |
| 24 June – 26 June | Vietnam | Hanoi | Official visit | President Nguyen Minh Triet | |
| 1 August – 15 August | China | Beijing | Official visit to attend the 2008 Summer Olympics | President Hu Jintao | |
| 15 October – 21 October | Canada | Quebec | Official visit to attend the XII summit of the Organisation internationale de la Francophonie | Prime Minister Stephen Harper, Governor General Michaëlle Jean, Premier Jean Charest | |

=== 2009 ===
| Date | Country | City | Details | Host | Ref. |
|---|---|---|---|---|---|
| 4 February – 25 February | China | Beijing | Routine visit | Non-applicable | |
| 3 September – 20 September | China | Beijing | Routine visit; courtesy call with Vice President Xi on 16 September | Vice President Xi Jinping | |

== 2010s ==
=== 2010 ===
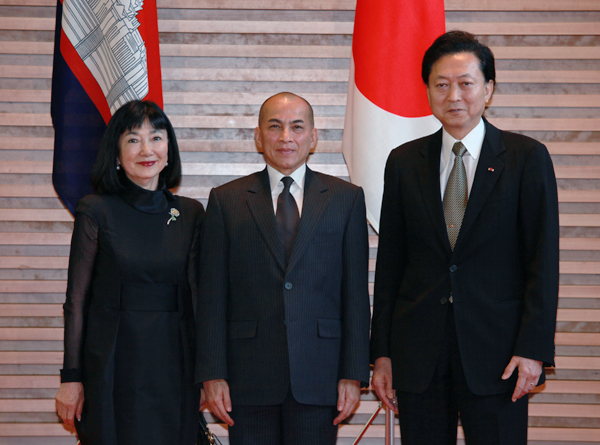
King Sihamoni with Japanese Prime Minister Yukio Hatoyama and Mrs Miyuki Hatoyama at the Kantei in Tokyo on 18 May 2010

| Date | Country | City | Details | Host | Ref. |
|---|---|---|---|---|---|
| 22 February – 31 March | China | Beijing, Fuzhou, Quanzhou | Routine visit; courtesy call with Congress Chairman Wu on 23 February. Visits to Fujian province, including the cities of Fuzhou on 1 March, Quanzhou on 3 March. | Congress Chairman Wu Bangguo | |
| 11 March – 12 March | France | Paris | Official visit for the induction ceremony of King Sihamoni into the Academy of Inscriptions and Belles-Lettres | Permanent Secretary of the Academy of Inscriptions and Belles-Lettres Jean Leclant | |
| 14 March – 21 March | Czech Republic | Prague | Private/ official visit | President Václav Klaus, First Lady Livia Klausová | |
| 16 May – 22 May | Japan | Tokyo, Kato | State visit from 16 – 20 May in Tokyo, then visit to the Nenbutsushu Sampozan Muryojuji Head Temple from May 20 to 22 in Kato | Prime Minister Yukio Hatoyama, Mrs Miyuki Hatoyama, Emperor Akihito, Empress Michiko | |
| 27 September – 10 October | China | Beijing, Shanghai | Routine visit; courtesy call with Chairman Wu on 2 October. Attendance of the Shanghai World Expo on 1 October | Congress Chairman Wu Bangguo | |

=== 2011 ===
| Date | Country | City | Details | Host | Ref. |
|---|---|---|---|---|---|
| 18 April – 12 May | China | Beijing | Routine visit | Non-applicable | |
| 8 August – 27 October | China | Beijing | Routine visit | Non-applicable | |

=== 2012 ===
| Date | Country | City | Details | Host | Ref. |
|---|---|---|---|---|---|
| 19 January – 15 February | China | Beijing | Routine visit; courtesy call with the Premier on 20 January | Premier Wen Jiabao | |
| 24 September – 26 September | Vietnam | Hanoi | State visit | President Trương Tấn Sang | |
| 15 October – 17 October | China | Beijing | Private/ official visit, accompanied by Prime Minister Hun Sen to escort the body of former King Norodom Sihanouk who died in Beijing on 15 October back home. Condolence visit from Premier Wen on the same day. Further visits from the Premier, along with President Hu on 17 October. | Premier Wen Jiabao, President Hu Jintao | |

=== 2013 ===
| Date | Country | City | Details | Host | Ref. |
|---|---|---|---|---|---|
| 21 February – 26 March | China | Beijing | Routine visit; courtesy call with the Premier on 21 February. | Premier Wen Jiabao | |
| 12 August – 11 September | China | Beijing, Nanjing | Routine visit; courtesy call with the Foreign Minister on 1 September. Attendance of the Asian Youth Games on 16 August in Nanjing, including meeting with provincial and local leaders | Foreign Minister Wang Yi, Party Secretary Luo Zhijun, Party Secretary Yang Weize, Vice Premier Liu Yandong | |

=== 2014 ===
| Date | Country | City | Details | Host | Ref. |
|---|---|---|---|---|---|
| 19 February – 25 March | China | Beijing | Routine visit; state dinner on 21 March | Vice President President Li Yuanchao | |
| 19 April – 12 May | France | Paris | Official visit to the Organisation internationale de la Francophonie on 7 May and attendance at a special function organized by the Académie des Inscriptions et Belles-Lettres on 9 May | Organisation internationale de la Francophonie General Secretary Abdou Diouf | |
| 25 August – 27 September | China | Beijing | Routine visit; courtesy call with the President and First Lady on 25 September | President Xi Jinping, First Lady Peng Liyuan | |
| 8 December – 9 December | Japan | Tokyo | Official visit to attend the VI World Buddhist Summit | Non-applicable | |

=== 2015 ===
| Date | Country | City | Details | Host | Ref. |
|---|---|---|---|---|---|
| 5 March – 3 May | China | Beijing | Routine visit; courtesy call with Chairman Yu on 17 April | Chairman of the Chinese People's Political Consultative Conference Yu Zhengsheng | |
| 14 August – 27 September | China | Beijing, Nanchang, Jiujiang | Routine visit; courtesy call with President Xi on 31 August. Attendance of the Victory Day Parade on 3 September in Beijing hosted by the First Couple. Visits to Jiangxi province, namely the cities of Nanchang and Jiujiang between 7 and 9 September | President Xi Jinping, First Lady Peng Liyuan, Party Secretary Qiang Wei, Governor Lu Xinshe | |
| 22 November – 6 December | France | Paris | Official visit to attend the United Nations Climate Change Conference (COP 21) | Minister for Ecology, Sustainable Development and Energy Segolene Royale | |
| 21 December – 23 December | Laos | Vientiane | Official visit | President Choummaly Sayasone | |

=== 2016 ===
| Date | Country | City | Details | Host | Ref. |
|---|---|---|---|---|---|
| 2 June – 4 June | China | Beijing | State visit | President Xi Jinping, Premier Li Keqiang, Congress Chairman Zhang Dejiang | |
| 5 July – 17 August | China | Beijing | Routine visit | Non-applicable | |

=== 2017 ===
| Date | Country | City | Details | Host | Ref. |
|---|---|---|---|---|---|
| 3 March – 11 April | China | Beijing, Hangzhou, Ningbo | Routine visit; courtesy call with the President and First Lady on 6 March in Beijing. Visits to Hangzhou and Ningbo between 5 and 8 April | President Xi Jinping, First Lady Peng Liyuan, Governor Che Jun, Party Secretary Tang Yijun | |
| 23 July – 4 October | China | Beijing | Routine visit | Non-applicable | |

=== 2018 ===
| Date | Country | City | Details | Host | Ref. |
|---|---|---|---|---|---|
| 22 February – 2 April | China | Beijing | Routine visit; courtesy call with State Councilor Yang on 25 February | State Councilor Yang Jiechi | |
| 6 April – 9 April | Japan | Kato | Official visit to attend the commemoration of the 4th International Buddhist Day and the inauguration ceremony of Nalanda Mahavihara (monasteries complex) | Non-applicable | |
| 10 September – 9 October | China | Beijing | Routine visit; courtesy call with the President and First Lady on 19 September and national day reception on 1 October | President Xi Jinping, First Lady Peng Liyuan | |
| 18 – 21 December | Vietnam | Hanoi, Da Nang | State visit | President Nguyễn Phú Trọng | |

=== 2019 ===
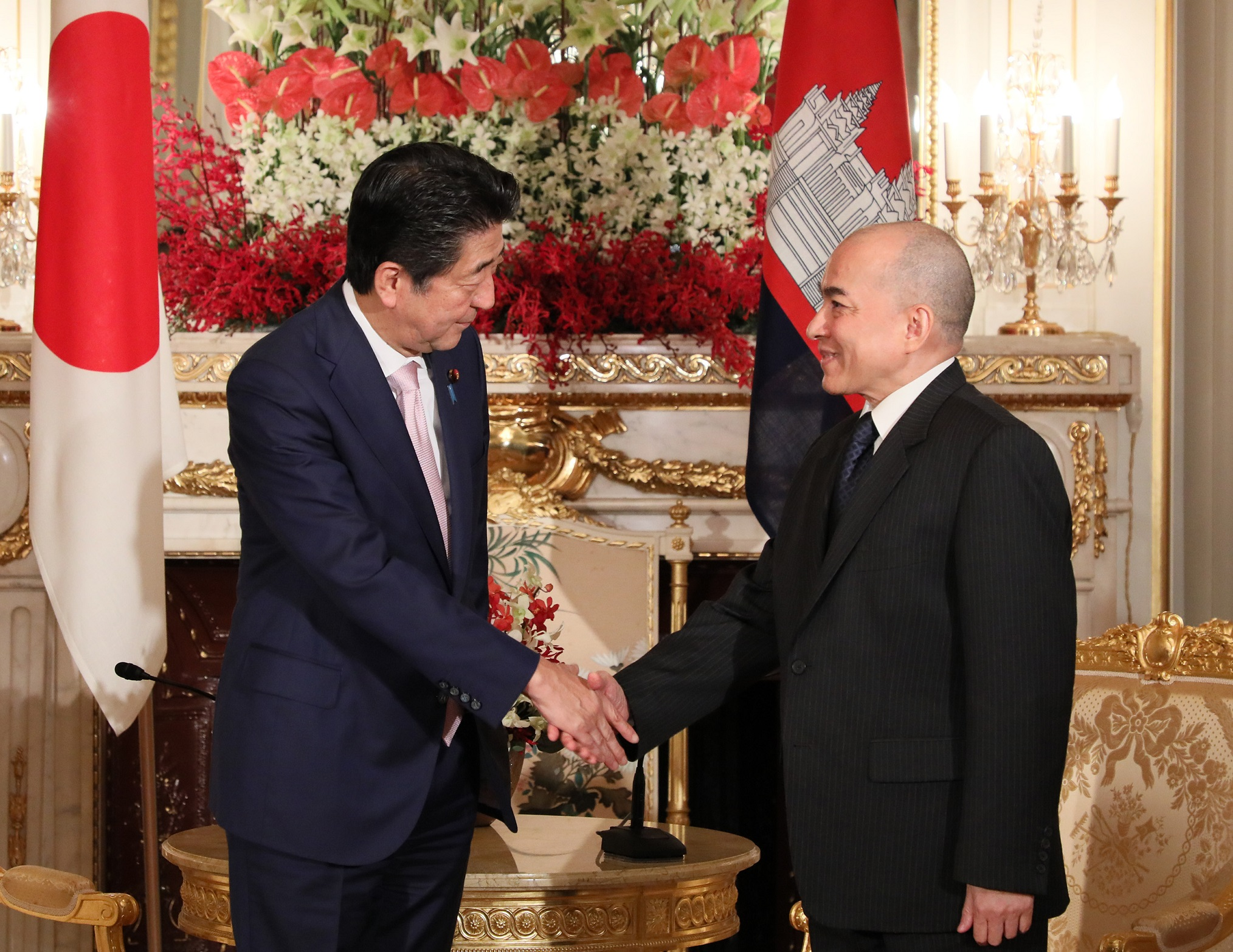
King Sihamoni greeting with Prime Minister Shinzo Abe of Japan in Tokyo, at the Akasaka Palace for Emperor Naruhito's enthronement on 22 October 2019

| Date | Country | City | Details | Host | Ref. |
|---|---|---|---|---|---|
| 17 March – 7 April | China | Beijing | Routine visit | Non-applicable | |
| 13 May – 16 May | China | Beijing | Official visit to attend the Conference on Dialogue of Asian Civilizations on 15 May; formal meeting held with President Xi on 14 May. | President Xi Jinping | |
| 23 May – 26 May | France | Paris | Official visit to attend the 25th Anniversary of the International Coordinating Committee for the Safeguarding and Development of the Historic Site of Angkor (ICC-Angkor). | Non-applicable | |
| 10 September – 2 October | China | Beijing | Routine visit; courtesy call with Chairman Wang on 27 September | Chairman of the Chinese People's Political Consultative Conference Wang Yang | |
| 21 October – 24 October | Japan | Tokyo | Official visit to attend the enthronement ceremony of Emperor Naruhito on 22 October, along with meeting the Prime Minister, Shinzo Abe | Prime Minister Shinzo Abe, Emperor Naruhito, Empress Masako | |

== 2020s ==
=== 2020 ===
| Date | Country | City | Details | Host | Ref. |
|---|---|---|---|---|---|
| 1 April – 11 May | China | Beijing | Routine visit; courtesy call with Councilor/ Foreign Minister on 8 May | State Councilor and Foreign Minister Wang Yi | |
| 6 October – 8 November | China | Yan'an, Xi'an, Beijing | Routine visit; official visits to Yan'an and Xi'an on 1 November meeting with provincial leaders. Attendance of Friendship Medal presentation ceremony to Queen-Mother Norodom Monineath, along with courtesy call with the President and First Lady on 6 November | Party Secretary Liu Guozhong, Governor Zhao Yide, President Xi Jinping, First Lady Peng Liyuan | |

=== 2021 ===
| Date | Country | City | Details | Host | Ref |
|---|---|---|---|---|---|
| 1 March – 16 March | China | Shanghai, Jiaxing | Routine visit; official visits to Shanghai and Jiaxing on 16 March. | Party Secretary Li Qiang, Mayor Gong Zheng, Party Secretary Yuan Jiajun | |
| 10 November – 15 November | France | Paris | Official visit to commemorate the 75th anniversary of UNESCO on 12 November | UNESCO Director-General Audrey Azoulay | |
| 16 August – 25 September | China | Beijing | Routine visit | Non-applicable | |

=== 2022 ===
| Date | Country | City | Details | Host | Ref. |
|---|---|---|---|---|---|
| 3 February – 6 February | China | Beijing | Official visit to attend the 2022 Winter Olympics, including the state banquet on 5 February. | President Xi Jinping, First Lady Peng Liyuan | |
| 4 March – 13 April | China | Beijing | Routine visit | Non-applicable | |
| 21 August – 1 October | China | Beijing | Routine visit; Official reception commemorating the 100th anniversary since the birth of former King Norodom Sihanouk on 15 September. | Vice President Wang Qishan | |

=== 2023 ===
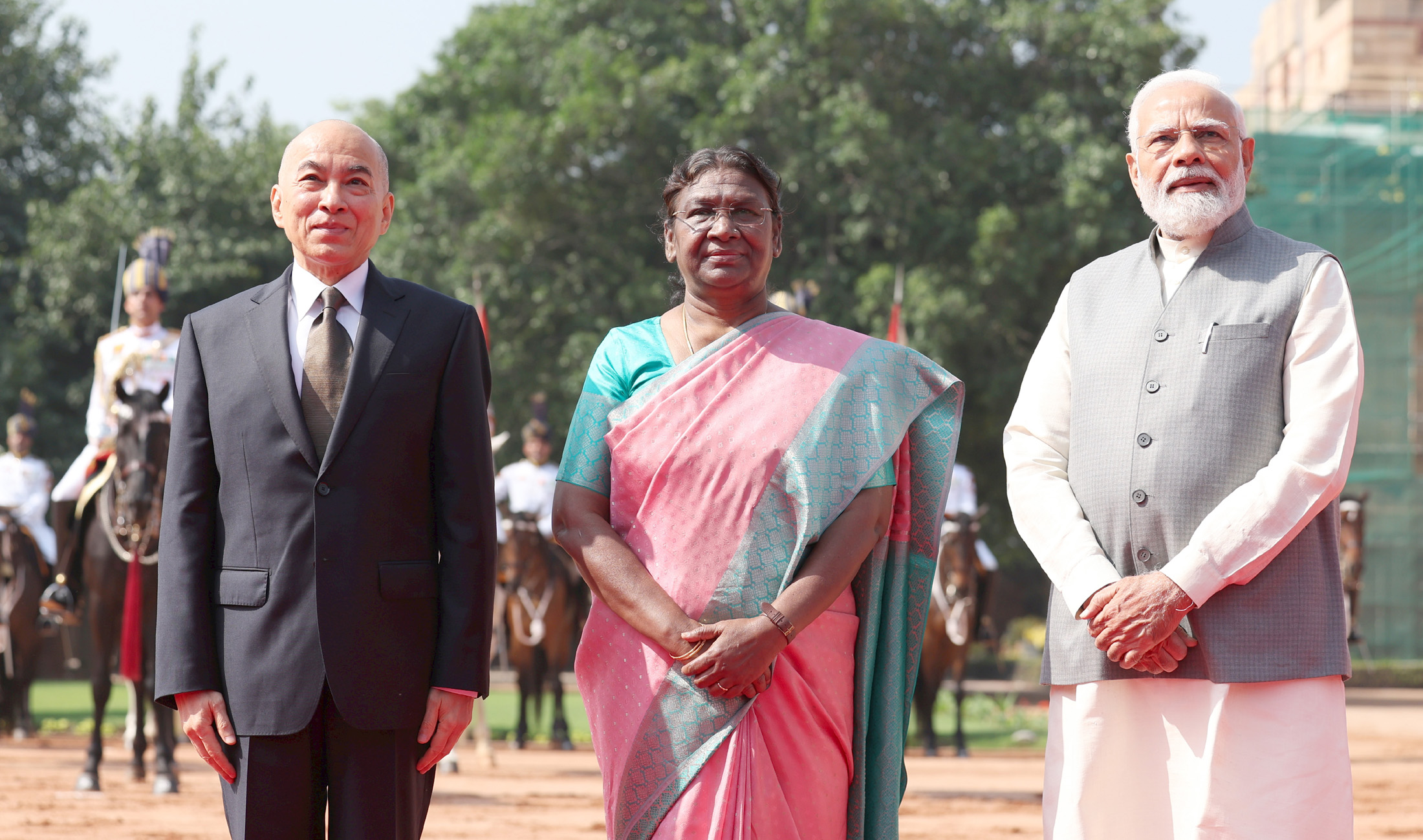
King Sihamoni is seen with Indian President Droupadi Murmu and Prime Minister Narendra Modi at the Rashtrapati Bhavan, in New Delhi during his state visit on 30 May 2023

| Date | Country | City | Details | Host | Ref. |
|---|---|---|---|---|---|
| 12 February – 16 March | China | Beijing | Routine visit; courtesy call with the President and First Lady on 24 February | President Xi Jinping, First Lady Peng Liyuan | |
| 29 – 31 May | India | New Delhi | State visit; to commemorate 70th anniversary of Indo-Cambodian diplomatic relations | President Droupadi Murmu | |
| 28 August – 1 October | China | Beijing, Hangzhou | Routine visit; courtesy call with President Xi on 23 September alongside attendance for the Asian Games in Hangzhou | President Xi Jinping | |
| 12 November – 18 November | France | Paris | Official visit; meeting with President Macron on 13 November and attendance of UNESCO's 4th Intergovernmental Conference on Angkor on 15 November, including audience with UNESCO Director-General Azoulay | President Emmanuel Macron, UNESCO Director-General Audrey Azoulay | |
| 19 December – 21 December | China | Fuzhou | Official visit; attendance of the 30th Anniversary Exhibition of the 3820 Strategic Plan (also referred to as the Strategic Vision for Fuzhou's 20 Year Economic and Social Development) | Non-applicable | |

=== 2024 ===
| Date | Country | City | Details | Host | Ref. |
|---|---|---|---|---|---|
| 5 April – 9 April | Japan | Osaka, Kato | State visit and to partake in International Buddhist Day celebrations on 8 April | Non-Applicable | |
| 26 February – 28 March | China | Beijing | Routine visit; courtesy call with Vice President Han on 21 March | Vice President Han Zheng | |
