= Hatoyama family =

Japanese family

Hatoyama
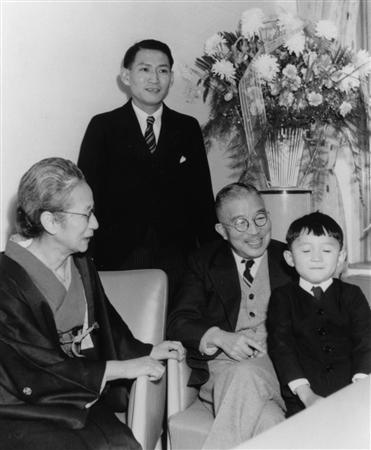
- From the left, Kaoru Hatoyama, Iichirō Hatoyama, Ichirō Hatoyama, Yukio Hatoyama in 1953.
- Current region: Tokyo, Japan
- Etymology: "Dove mountain"
- Origin: Okayama Prefecture
- Members: Ichirō Hatoyama; Yukio Hatoyama
- Traditions: Politics
- Estate: Hatoyama Hall

The Hatoyama family is a Japanese political family. Ichirō Hatoyama and Yukio Hatoyama served as a Prime Minister of Japan from 1954 to 1956 and from 2009 to 2010, respectively. Its members also include educators Haruko Hatoyama and Kaoru Hatoyama, and foreign minister Iichirō Hatoyama. It has been called "Japan's Kennedy family."

== Family tree ==
Hatoyama family tree

Haruko Hatoyama	Kazuo Hatoyama
Kaoru Hatoyama	Ichirō Hatoyama	Hideo Hatoyama
Yasuko Hatoyama	Iichirō Hatoyama
Kazuko Inoue	Miyuki Hatoyama	Yukio Hatoyama	Emily Hatoyama	Kunio Hatoyama
Kiichirō Hatoyama	Tarō Hatoyama	Jirō Hatoyama
