= 2016 Fukuoka 6th district by-election =

- 23 October 2016

Fukuoka 6th district
Nominee	Jirō Hatoyama	Fumiko Arai	Ken Kurauchi
Party	Independent	Democratic	Independent
Alliance			LDP
Popular vote	106,531	40,020	22,253
Percentage	62.24%	23.38%	13.00%
Nominee	Tadahiro Nishihara
Party	Happiness Realization
Popular vote	2,359
Percentage	1.38%
Representative before election
Kunio Hatoyama
LDP
Elected Representative
Jirō Hatoyama
Independent (Note: Hatoyama joined the LDP caucus soon after he was elected.)

A by-election for the Fukuoka 6th district in the Japanese Japanese House of Representatives was held on 23 October 2016. The by-election was called following the death of the incumbent member Kunio Hatoyama, a former cabinet minister and member of the Liberal Democratic Party (LDP), from duodenal ulcer in Tokyo on 21 June 2016. Hatoyama had served the district since 2005 and defended the seat by a margin of 43.94% in the 2014 election, where he faced only a Japanese Communist Party candidate. A separate by-election for the Tokyo 10th district was held on the same day.

Hatoyama's son and Ōkawa mayor Jirō Hatoyama won the by-election as an independent. Hatoyama contested as an independent after a conflict with the local chapter of the LDP on the candidate selection process. The Fukuoka LDP prefectural chapter president, Isao Kurauchi, had submitted the nomination of his son Ken Kurauchi as the LDP candidate for the by-election before Hatoyama declared his candidacy. Hatoyama, who had originally planned to contest the by-election as an LDP candidate, protested this decision and decided to run as an independent. The national headquarters of the LDP attempted to persuade Kurauchi to drop out of the race to prevent dividing the LDP vote in the district. Kurauchi refused to drop out and contested the by-election.

Hatoyama joined the LDP caucus soon after taking his seat in the Diet.

== Candidates ==
- Jirō Hatoyama (Independent, later LDP), Mayor of Ōkawa and son of former representative Kunio Hatoyama
- Fumiko Arai (DP, supported by SDP), former diplomat at the Japanese consulate-general in Chennai
- Ken Kurauchi (Independent, LDP member), secretary at the Fukuoka chapter of the LDP and son of chapter president Isao Kurauchi
- Tadahiro Nishihara (HRP), constituency party leader

== Results ==
House of Representatives: Fukuoka 6th district by-election, 2016
Party	Candidate	Votes	%	±%
Independent	Jirō Hatoyama	106,531	62.24	N/A
Democratic	Fumiko Arai	40,020	23.38	N/A
Independent	Ken Kurauchi	22,253	13.00	N/A
Happiness Realization	Tadahiro Nishihara	2,359	1.38	N/A
Rejected ballots		1,195	1.11	
Majority		66,511	38.86	▼5.08
Turnout		173,078	45.46	▼1.52
Independent gain from LDP		Swing	N/A	
