= Kiichirō Hatoyama =

Japanese academic, politician (born 1976)

- 鳩山 紀一郎
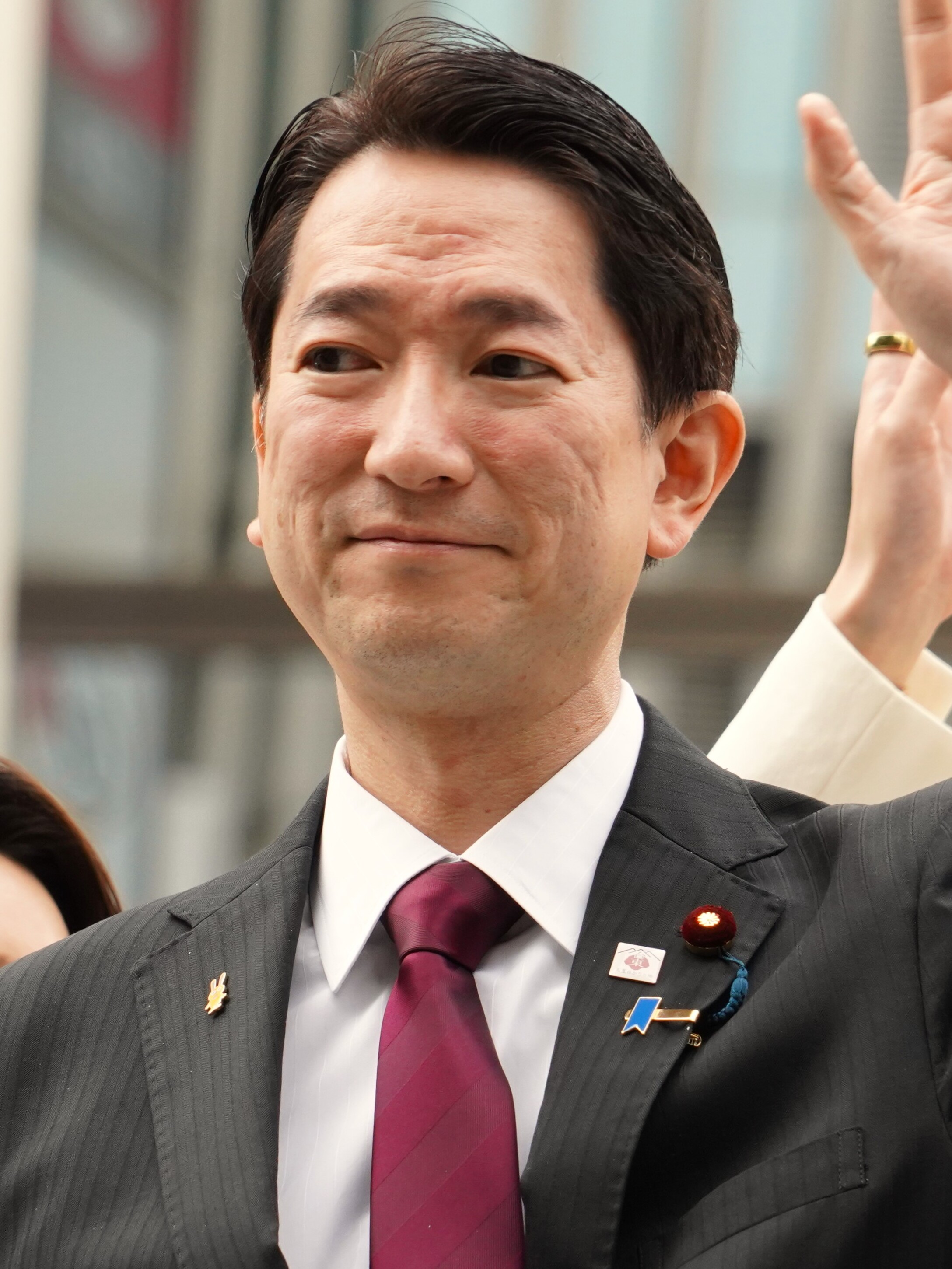
- Hatoyama in May 2025

Member of the House of Representatives
- In office 1 November 2024 – 23 January 2026
- Constituency: Tokyo PR

Personal details
- Born: 26 July 1976 (age 50) California, U.S.
- Party: DPP (since 2023)
- Children: 3
- Parent(s): Yukio Hatoyama; Miyuki Hatoyama
- Relatives: Hatoyama family
- Education: University of Tokyo (BEng, MEng, PhD)

Kiichirō Hatoyama (鳩山 紀一郎, Hatoyama Kiichirō; born 26 July 1976) is a Japanese academic and politician. He was a member of the House of Representatives from 2024 to 2026.

== Early life and education ==
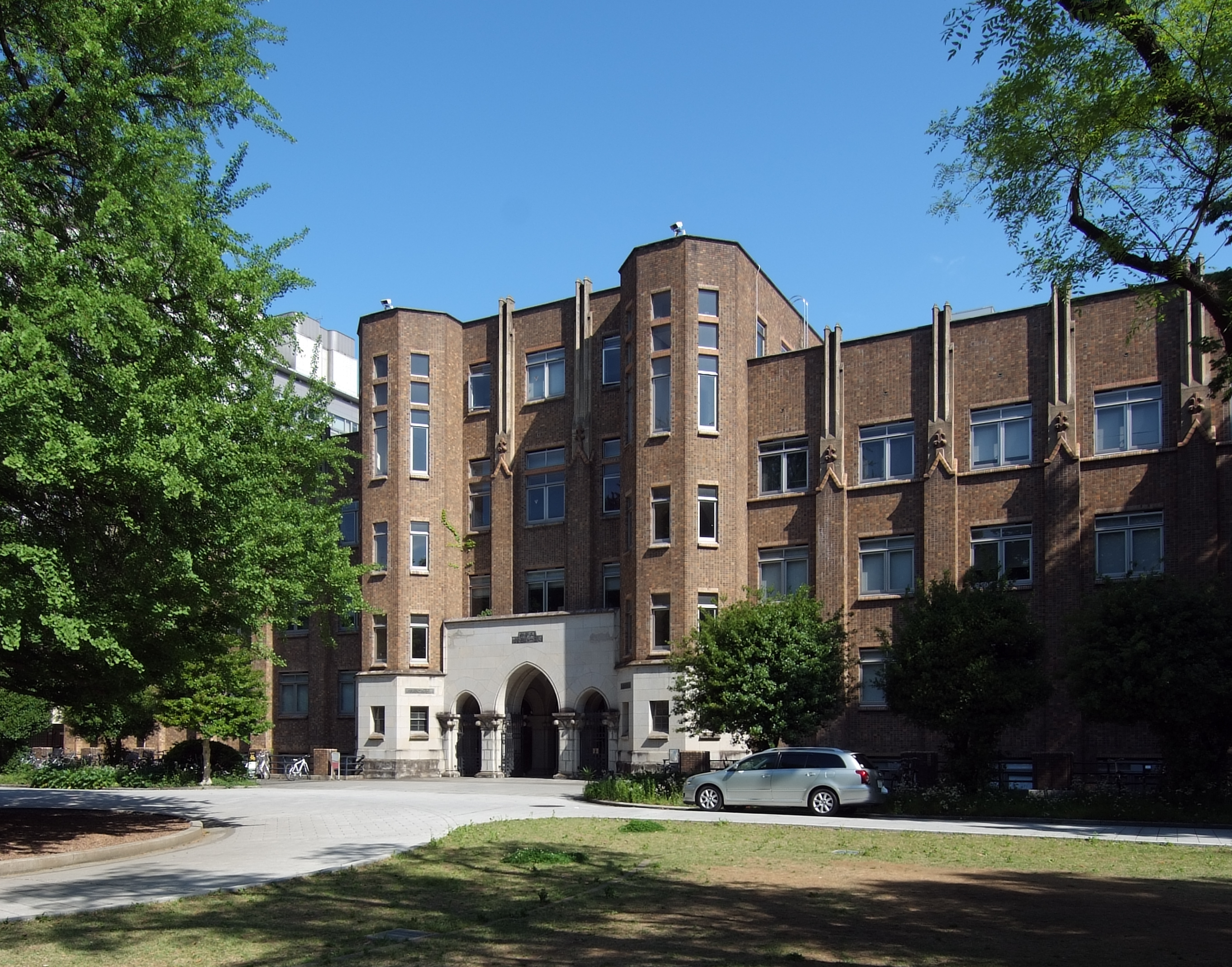
Department of Civil Engineering building at the University of Tokyo, where Hatoyama was based as a postgraduate and lecturer for more than a decade

Hatoyama was born on 26 July 1976 in California, when his father Yukio Hatoyama, later prime minister, was studying for his PhD in operations research at Stanford University. Hatoyama is a member of the Hatoyama family, and his other notable relations include his great grandfather Ichirō Hatoyama, former prime minister of Japan and the founder of the Liberal Democratic Party, Ichirō's father Kazuo Hatoyama, prominent jusrist and politician in Meiji era Japan, and Ichirō's son Iichirō Hatoyama.

Hatoyama was educated at the Gakushuin Junior High School and Senior High School at Komaba, University of Tsukuba. Following family tradition, he matriculated at the University of Tokyo (UTokyo) in 1995, where he chose to specialise in urban engineering after the Shingaku Furiwake. During his time at UTokyo, he was a cellist in the university orchestra. He completed his master’s degree at UTokyo in 2001 and went on to earn a PhD in transport engineering in 2007. His thesis was entitled Guideline Formulation for Signalized Intersection Design Considering Impacts on Pedestrians' Psychology.

He remained at his alma mater as assistant professor and lecturer until 2017, when he was appointed associated professor at Nagaoka University of Technology. Beginning in 2008, he spent three years at Moscow State University as a visiting professor.

== Political career ==
He is a member of the Democratic Party for the People, having joined in 2023. He was first elected in the 2024 Japanese general election for the Tokyo proportional representation block. He lost his Tokyo 2nd district contest to the incumbent, but was elected via the PR block after getting enough votes (73.4% sekihairitsu) to obtain his party's last block seat.

He was defeated in the 2026 election.
