= Tokyo 9th district (1890–1898) =

Legislative district of Japan

Tokyo 9th district was a constituency of the House of Representatives in the Imperial Diet of Japan (national legislature) between 1890 and 1898. It was located in Tokyo and consisted of Tokyo City's Koishikawa, Ushigome and Yotsuya wards.

After losing narrowly in 1890, former Tokyo prefectural representative Hatoyama Kazuo represented Tokyo 9th district from the 1892 election until its dissolution in 1902. He was unchallenged in the 1894 and 1898 elections.

== Election results ==
August 1898
Party	Candidate	Votes	%	±%
Kensei Hontō	Hatoyama Kazuo	250		

March 1898
Party	Candidate	Votes	%	±%
Shimpotō	Hatoyama Kazuo	160		

September 1894
Party	Candidate	Votes	%	±%
Rikken Kaishintō	Hatoyama Kazuo	142		

March 1894
Party	Candidate	Votes	%	±%
Rikken Kaishintō	Hatoyama Kazuo	136		

1892
Party	Candidate	Votes	%	±%
Rikken Kaishintō	Hatoyama Kazuo	65		
	Shiraishi Tsuyoshi	46		
	Other candidates	1		

1890
Party	Candidate	Votes	%	±%
Taiseikai (pro-Meiji-oligarchy/government)	Yoshino Tsugutsune	58		
Kaishintō (from the Popular Rights Movement)	Hatoyama Kazuo	54		
	Ugawa Seisaburō	45		
	Other candidates	6		
