= Issei Koga =

Japanese politician

- 古賀 一成
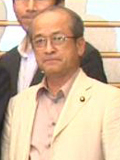
- Koga in 2012

Member of the House of Representatives
- In office 9 November 2003 – 16 November 2012
- Preceded by: Ryūzō Aramaki
- Succeeded by: Multi-member district
- Constituency: Fukuoka 6th (2003–2005); Kyushu PR (2005–2012)
- In office 18 February 1990 – 15 October 2002
- Preceded by: Heihachirō Yamazaki
- Succeeded by: Takashi Yonezawa
- Constituency: Fukuoka 3rd (1990–1996); Kyushu PR (1996–2002)

Personal details
- Born: 30 July 1947 (age 79) Yanagawa, Fukuoka, Japan
- Party: Democratic (1998–2012)
- Other political affiliations: LDP (1990–1993); Independent (1993–1994); JRP (1994); NFP (1994–1998); GGP (1998)
- Education: University of Tokyo

Issei Koga (古賀 一成, Koga Issei; born 30 July 1947) is a retired Japanese politician of the Democratic Party of Japan, who served as a member of the House of Representatives in the Diet (national legislature). A native of Yanagawa, Fukuoka and graduate of the University of Tokyo, he was a bureaucrat at the Ministry of Construction from 1971 to 1988. He was elected to the House of Representatives for the first time in 1990.
