= Hoifu Energy Group =

- Formerly: Karl Thomson Holdings
- Company type: Public
- Traded as: SEHK: 7
- ISIN: BMG4613K1099
- Industry: Energy; Financial services
- Founded: 2000
- Founder: Lam Kwok Hing
- Headquarters: Hamilton, Bermuda (legal); Shun Tak Centre, Hong Kong (de facto)
Key people
Yukio Hatoyama	(hon. chairman)
Hui Chi Ming	(chairman)
Neil Bush	(deputy chairman)
Chui Say Hoe	(managing director)
- Divisions: Karl Thomson Financial Group
- Website: www.hoifuenergy.com

Hoifu Energy Group Limited is a Bermuda-incorporated energy and financial-sector holding company. The company is headquartered in Hong Kong with shares listed on The Stock Exchange of Hong Kong.

== History ==
Karl Thomson Holdings Limited was incorporated in Bermuda and registered as a "Registered non-Hong Kong company" in Hong Kong since 30 May 2000. In January 2013, the company was renamed to Hoifu Energy Group Limited, as well as adding a registered Chinese name (Chinese: 凱富能源集團有限公司). The company had a Chinese trading name 高信集團控股有限公司 before 2013.

Karl Thomson Holdings was the parent company of Hong Kong-based Karl Thomson Financial Group, which was founded by Lam Kwok Hing (Chinese: 藍國慶). Its core subsidiaries, Karl-Thomson Securities and Karl-Thomson Commodities, were founded in 1991.

In September 2006, an associate company (20% stake) of Karl Thomson Holdings, Aminex Petroleum, acquired the exploration and production rights of an oil field in Egypt. In November 2006, the company acquired Australia-listed company Volant Petroleum, a manufacturer for oil-industry. In 2011, it was reported that Karl Thomson Holdings temporary suspended the operation in Egypt due to Egyptian revolution of 2011.

== Subsidiaries and divisions ==
- Karl Thomson Financial Group
- Asia Tele-Net and Technology (former)
