= Kaoru Hatoyama =

Japanese educator (1888–1982)

- 鳩山 薫
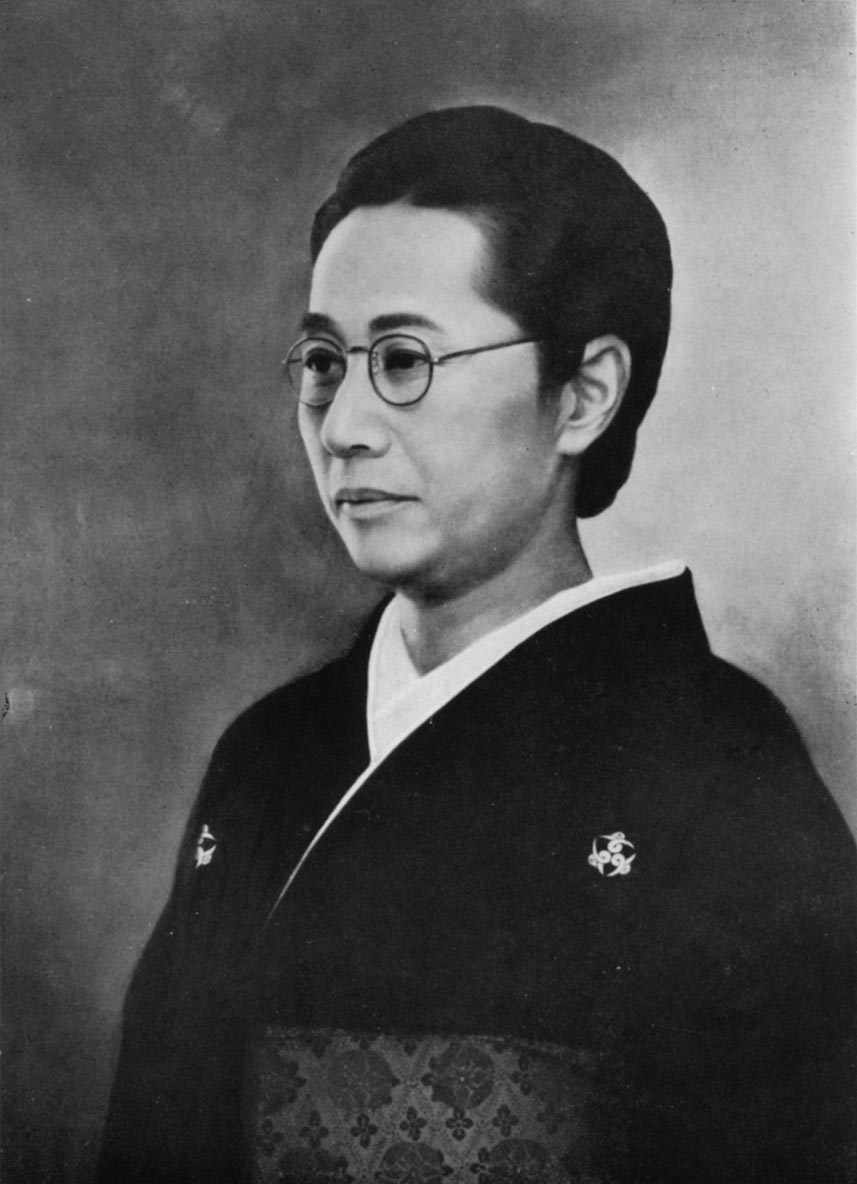
- Hatoyama in 1938

Spouse of the Prime Minister of Japan
- In office December 10, 1954 – December 23, 1956
- Monarch: Hirohito
- Prime Minister: Ichirō Hatoyama
- Preceded by: Kiyo Sakamoto
- Succeeded by: Ume Iwai

Personal details
- Born: 21 November 1888 Yokohama, Kanagawa, Japan
- Died: 15 August 1982 (aged 93)
- Spouse: Ichirō Hatoyama
- Children: Iichirō Hatoyama
- Occupation: educator and administrator

Kaoru Hatoyama (鳩山 薫, Hatoyama Kaoru; 21 November 1888 – 15 August 1982) was a Japanese educator and academic administrator who was the president of Kyoritsu Women's University, which was founded by her mother-in-law, Haruko Hatoyama. She was the wife of Ichirō Hatoyama, the 52nd–54th Prime Minister of Japan from 1954 to 1956. She was the mother of Iichirō Hatoyama, who was Japan's Foreign Minister from 1976 to 1977. She was the grandmother of Prime Minister Yukio Hatoyama who served from 2009 to 2010 and politician Kunio Hatoyama.

== See also ==
- Hatoyama Hall (Hatoyama Kaikan)

== Notes ==
Unofficial roles
Preceded by Sumi Ashida	Spouse of the Prime Minister of Japan; 1954–1956	Succeeded by Ume Ishibashi
