= Haruko Hatoyama =

Japanese educator

- 鳩山 春子
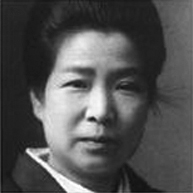
- Born: 2 May 1861; Matsumoto, Shinano Province, Tokugawa Shogunate
- Died: 12 July 1938 (aged 77)
- Occupation: Educator
- Known for: Founding Kyoritsu Women's College
- Spouse: Kazuo Hatoyama (m. 1881; died 1911)
- Children: Ichirō Hatoyama; Hideo Hatoyama
- Relatives: Iichirō Hatoyama (grandson); Yukio Hatoyama (great-grandson); Kunio Hatoyama (great-grandson)

Haruko Hatoyama (鳩山 春子, Hatoyama Haruko; March 23, 1861 – July 12, 1938) was a Japanese educator who was a co-founder of what is today Kyoritsu Women's University. The matriarch of the Hatoyama political family, her husband was politician Kazuo Hatoyama.

== Early life ==
Haruko Hatoyama was born in Matsumoto, the youngest of seven children (five girls and two boys). Her father, Tsumu, was a samurai. He changed the family name from Watanabe to Taga after the Meiji Restoration in 1868. Her education began at home with her mother, and was supplemented by the lessons from local teachers of Chinese classics. Her education was different from her sisters because she was allowed to pursue the same curriculum as a boy. She was among the first students to enroll when a small, all-girls school opened in Matsumoto in 1873. However, her knowledge was so advanced that her father decided to pull her out of the small school and take her to Tokyo to be educated.

She attended the Takebashi Girls' School, which had been opened by the government in 1872 for the purpose of training female teachers. Her lessons were held both in her native Japanese dialect and in American English. After the government closed the school in 1877, the Education Ministry transferred her and her classmates to a newly established English section within the Tokyo Women's Normal School. She graduated in 1878.

She continued her education by enrolling the Tokyo Women's Higher Normal School. In 1879, she was one of three students selected by the Ministry of Education to study in the United States. She graduated in July 1881, and briefly joined the faculty until she got married, at which point she resigned.

== Family ==
Haruko married Kazuo Hatoyama in an arranged marriage on November 16, 1881. Her behavior was different from that of a typical bride of that period because she held a job outside the home and engaged in translating legal documents.

Kazuo Hatoyama was speaker of the House of Representatives of the Diet of Japan from 1896 to 1897 during the Meiji era. Kazuo later served as the president of Waseda University.

Haruko died at home on July 12, 1938 of arteriosclerosis.

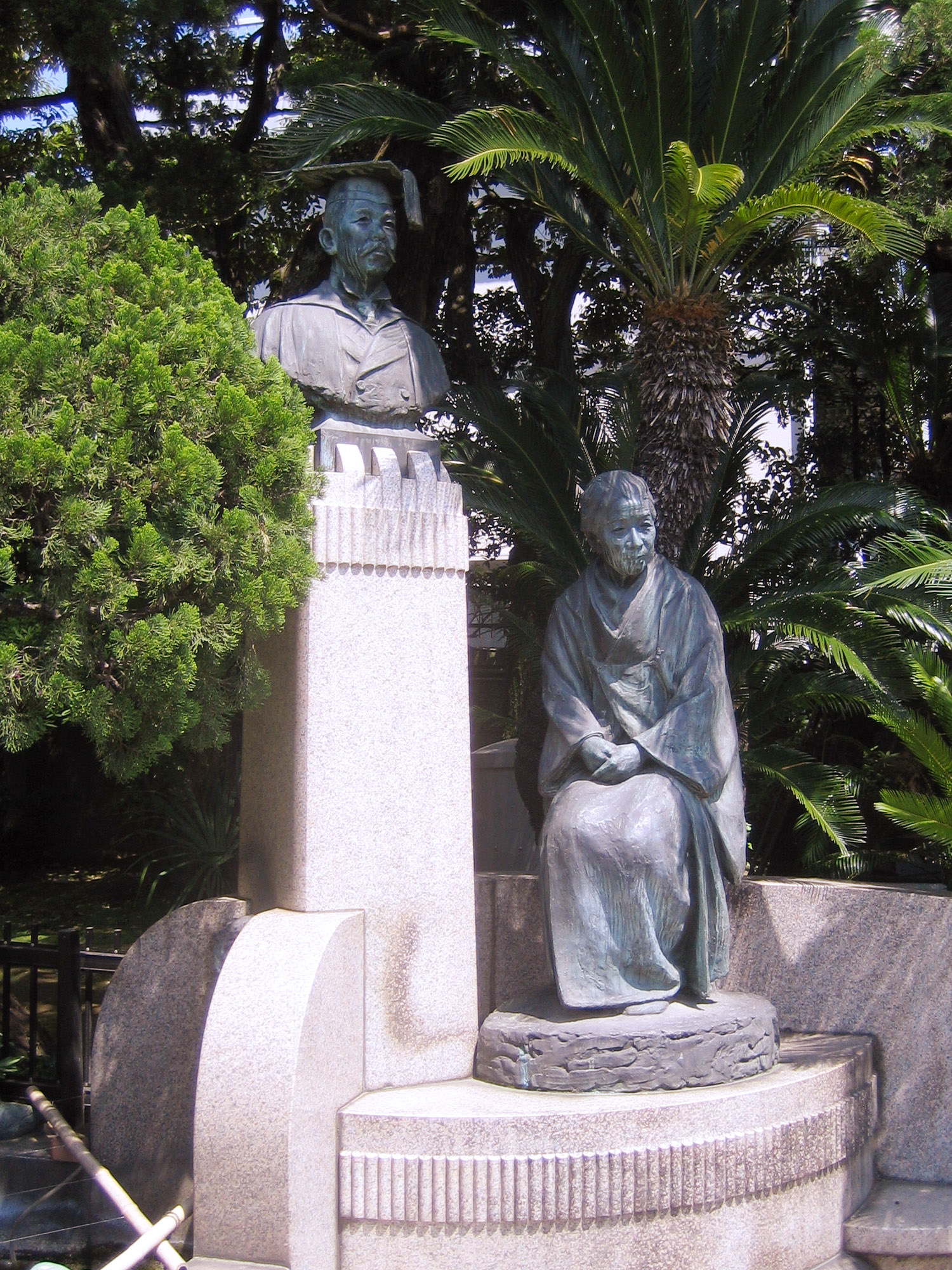
Bronze bust of Kazuo paired with bronze seated figure of Haruko Hatoyama in the garden of Hatoyama Hall in Tokyo.

=== Politician progeny ===
Her son was former Prime Minister Ichirō Hatoyama, who founded and was the first president of the Liberal Democratic Party (LDP).

Her grandson was former Foreign Minister Iichirō Hatoyama. Her great-grandson Kunio Hatoyama served as Minister of Internal Affairs and Communications under Prime Minister Taro Aso until June 12, 2009.

Her great-grandson Yukio Hatoyama represents the 9th district of Hokkaidō in the House of Representatives and is a former leader of the Democratic Party of Japan (DPJ). Yukio was Prime Minister of Japan between September 16, 2009 and June 8, 2010.

== Modern Femininity and Education ==
Hatoyama was one of the leaders of the strong Westernizing trend during the Meiji period, known as Bunmei Kaika (文明開化; lit. 'civilisation and enlightenment'). She wrote several essays for women's magazines on the importance of raising the level of women's education in Japan.

After helping found the Kyoritsu Women's University, she became head of the newly created home economics department. In December 1922, she became president of the school, and held this position until her death.

She was a member of the Japanese Women's Hygiene Association, Women's Patriotic Association, and the Japanese League of Women Association, among others. She received awards from the Imperial Household Ministry, the Tokyo prefecture, Tokyo City, the Tokyo League of Women's associations, and the Koishikawa Young Women's Association.
