= Fukuoka 6th district =

- Parliamentary constituency for the Japanese House of Representatives
- Numbered map of the Fukuoka Prefecture single seats
- Prefecture: Fukuoka
- Proportional District: Kyushu
- Electorate: 369,370

Current constituency
- Created: 1994
- Seats: One
- Party: LDP
- Representatives: Jiro Hatoyama
- Municipalities: Cities of Kurume, Ogori, Okawa, and Ukiha. Districts of Mii and Mizuma.

Fukuoka 6th district (福岡県第6区, Fukuoka-ken dai-rokku or simply 福岡6区, Fukuoka-rokku) is a single-member constituency of the House of Representatives in the national Diet of Japan located in Fukuoka Prefecture.

== Areas covered ==
=== Since 2013 ===
- Kurume
- Ogōri
- Ōkawa
- Ukiha
- Mii District
- Mizuma District

=== 1994 - 2013 ===
- Kurume
- Ogōri
- Ōkawa
- Ukiha District
- Mii District
- Mizuma District

== List of representatives ==
Election	Representative	Party	Notes
1996	Masahiro Koga	NFP	Died on September 6, 2002.
1996	Masahiro Koga	Independent	Died on September 6, 2002.
2000	Masahiro Koga	LDP	Died on September 6, 2002.
2002 by-el	Ryuzo Aramaki	LDP	
2003	Issei Koga	Democratic	
2005	Kunio Hatoyama	LDP	Died on June 21, 2016.
2009	Kunio Hatoyama	LDP	Died on June 21, 2016.
2012	Kunio Hatoyama	Independent	Died on June 21, 2016.
2014	Kunio Hatoyama	LDP	Died on June 21, 2016.
2016 by-el	Jiro Hatoyama	Independent	
2017	Jiro Hatoyama	LDP	
2021	Jiro Hatoyama	LDP	
2024	Jiro Hatoyama	LDP	
2026	Jiro Hatoyama	LDP	

== Election results ==
=== 2026 ===
2026
Party	Candidate	Votes	%	±%
LDP	Jiro Hatoyama (Incumbent)	111,832	61.8	▲13.26
DPP	Masahiko Kondo (Won a PR seat)	55,538	30.7	▲4.84
JCP	Kazuhiro Kawano	13,619	7.5	▲0.85
Majority		56,294	31.1	▲8.42
Registered electors		365,775		
Turnout		180,989	51.93	▲0.99
LDP hold				

=== 2024 ===
2024
Party	Candidate	Votes	%	±%
LDP	Jiro Hatoyama (Incumbent)	88,197	48.54	▼18.91
DPP	Masahiko Kondo	46,997	25.86	New
Ishin	Kenta Fukunari	22,779	12.54	New
JCP	Kazuhiro Kawano	12,091	6.65	▼0.11
Sanseitō	Yasushi Furukawa	11,651	6.41	New
Majority		41,200	22.68	
Registered electors		368,279		
Turnout			50.94	▼0.25
LDP hold				

=== 2021 ===
2021
Party	Candidate	Votes	%	±%
LDP	Jiro Hatoyama (Incumbent)	125,366	67.45	▲1.15
CDP	Tōru Tanabe	38,578	20.75	New
JCP	Kazuhiro Kawano	12,565	6.76	▼2.06
Independent	Yoshiaki Kumisaka	5,612	3.02	New
Anti-NHK	Eiji Kumamaru	3,753	2.02	New
Majority		86,788	46.70	
Registered electors		374,631		
Turnout			51.19	▼2.63
LDP hold				

=== 2017 ===
2017
Party	Candidate	Votes	%	±%
LDP	Jiro Hatoyama (Incumbent)	131,244	66.30	▼5.66
Independent	Fumiko Arai	43,175	21.81	New
JCP	Tokiko Kobayashi	17,451	8.82	▼19.22
Happiness Realization	Tadahiro Nishihara	6,093	3.07	N/A
Majority		88,069	44.49	
Registered electors		379,173		
Turnout			53.82	▲6.84
LDP hold				

=== 2016 ===
2016 Fukuoka 6th district by-election
Party	Candidate	Votes	%	±%
Independent	Jiro Hatoyama	106,531	62.24	New
Democratic	Fumiko Arai	40,020	23.38	New
Independent	Ken Kurauchi	22,253	13.00	New
Happiness Realization	Tadahiro Nishihara	2,359	1.38	N/A
Majority		66,511	38.86	
Registered electors		380,237		
Turnout			45.46	▼1.52
Independent gain from LDP				

=== 2014 ===
2014
Party	Candidate	Votes	%	±%
LDP	Kunio Hatoyama (Incumbent)	116,413	71.96	N/A
JCP	Mutsumi Kaneko	45,357	28.04	▲22.82
Majority		71,056	43.92	
Registered electors		371,160		
Turnout			46.98	▼11.68
LDP hold				

=== 2012 ===
2012
Party	Candidate	Votes	%	±%
Independent	Kunio Hatoyama (Incumbent)	87,705	41.57	New
Democratic	Issei Koga	47,643	22.58	▼22.98
Restoration	Gasei Uchino	32,321	15.32	New
Independent	Yoshiaki Eguchi	32,305	15.31	New
JCP	Mutsumi Kaneko	11,003	5.22	N/A
Majority		40,062	18.99	
Registered electors				
Turnout			58.66	
Independent hold				

=== 2009 ===
2009
Party	Candidate	Votes	%	±%
LDP	Kunio Hatoyama (Incumbent)	138,327	52.75	▲0.68
Democratic	Issei Koga (Won PR seat)	119,481	45.56	▲2.22
Happiness Realization	Hiroshi Sato	4,429	1.69	New
Majority		18,846	7.19	
Registered electors				
Turnout				
LDP hold				

=== 2005 ===
2005
Party	Candidate	Votes	%	±%
LDP	Kunio Hatoyama	131,946	52.07	▲5.41
Democratic	Issei Koga (Incumbent) (Won PR seat)	109,826	43.34	▼5.60
JCP	Kazuya Nakanishi	11,623	4.59	▲0.19
Majority		22,120	8.73	
Registered electors				
Turnout				
LDP gain from Democratic				

=== 2003 ===
2003
Party	Candidate	Votes	%	±%
Democratic	Issei Koga	108,678	48.94	▲7.26
LDP	Ryuzo Aramaki (Incumbent)	103,616	46.66	▼1.70
JCP	Kazuya Nakanishi	9,785	4.40	▼2.91
Majority		5,062	2.28	
Registered electors				
Turnout				
Democratic gain from LDP				

=== 2002 by-election ===
2002 Fukuoka 6th district by-election
Party	Candidate	Votes	%	±%
LDP	Ryuzo Aramaki	84,740	47.67	▼0.69
Democratic	Issei Koga	61,080	34.36	▼7.32
Independent	Yoshitaka Nobu	24,123	13.57	New
JCP	Hidehiko Marubayashi	7,820	4.40	▼2.91
Majority		23,660	13.31	
Registered electors				
Turnout				
LDP hold				

=== 2000 ===
2000
Party	Candidate	Votes	%	±%
LDP	Masahiro Koga (Incumbent)	105,423	48.36	▲12.19
Democratic	Issei Koga (Won PR seat)	90,861	41.68	New
JCP	Hidehiko Marubayashi	15,931	7.31	▼2.95
Liberal League	Takeo Hara	5,770	2.65	New
Majority		14,562	6.68	
Registered electors				
Turnout				
LDP hold				

=== 1996 ===
1996
Party	Candidate	Votes	%	±%
New Frontier	Masahiro Koga	106,262	53.57	New
LDP	Ken Negishi	71,742	36.17	New
JCP	Hidehiko Marubayashi	20,368	10.26	New
Majority		34,520	17.40	
Registered electors				
Turnout				
New Frontier win (new seat)				
