= Seiichi Tejima =

Japanese educator

Incorporates translated material from the article in the Japanese Wikipedia

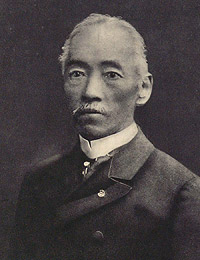
Seiichi Tejimain picture

Seiichi Tejima (手島 精一, Tejima Seiichi; 1850-01-11 - 1918-01-23) was a Japanese educator of the Meiji period. Principal of the Tokyo Technical School, Tokyo Technical High School and Tokyo Higher Technical School, the former constituent parts of the current Tokyo Institute of Technology. A prominent advocate for technical education, Tejima became the second president of the Tokyo Institute of Technology and served in this capacity from 1890-1898, 1899-1901 and 1901-1916.

Tejima was also one of the many co-founders of what is today Kyoritsu Women's University. The asteroid 8731 Tejima was named after him.

== Early life and education ==
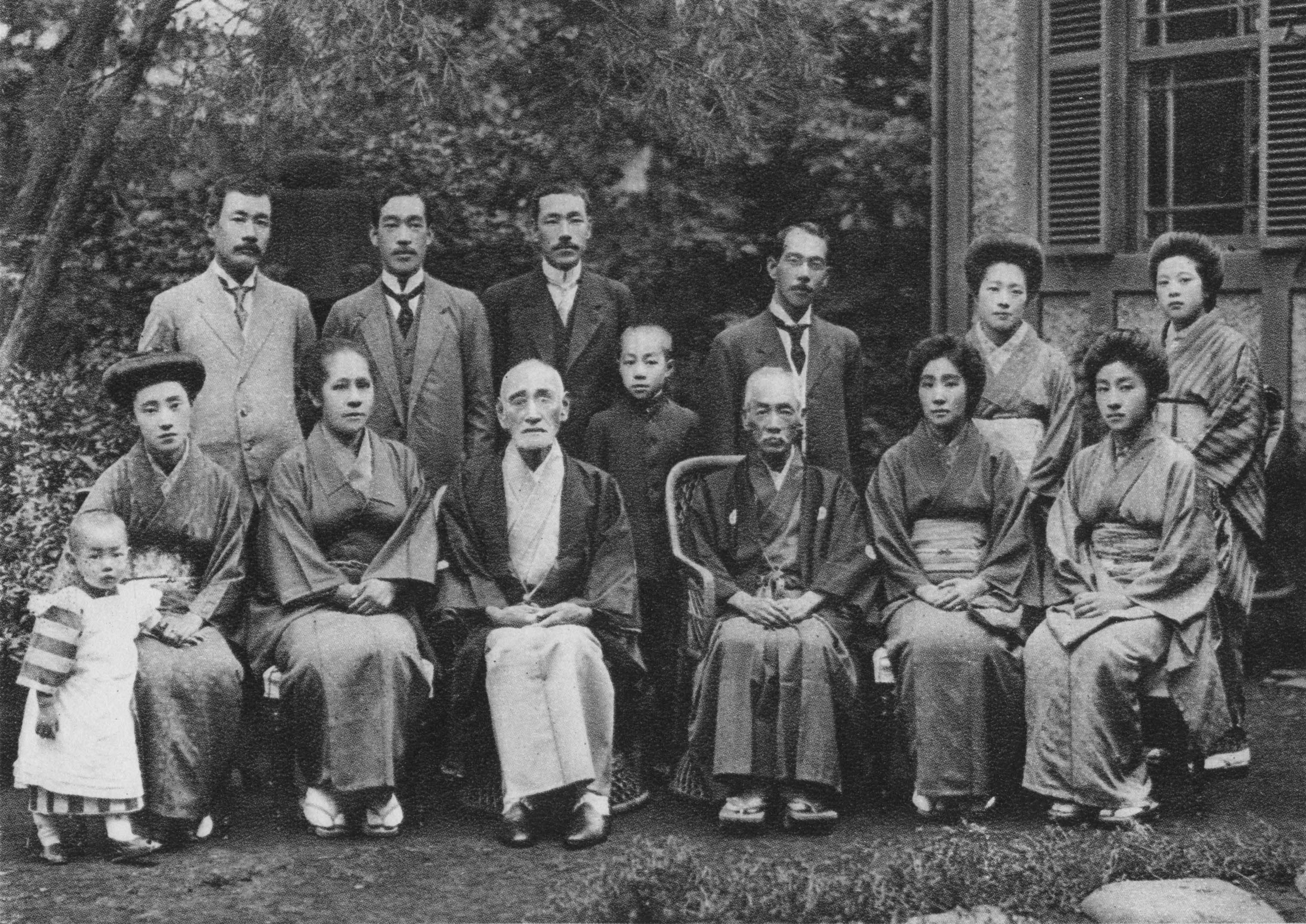
Tejima and his family at his home in 1914

Son of a samurai retainer from Numazu, Shizuoka, Tejima travelled privately to the United States in 1870 entering a secondary school in Philadelphia and then attending classes at Lafayette College. When the Iwakura Mission arrived in Washington DC in early 1872 he offered his services as a translator and stayed with the mission as they travelled to Europe. In 1873 he returned to the United Kingdom to study rail transportation.

== Honors ==
=== Japanese ===
- Grand Cordon (then First Class) of the Order of the Sacred Treasure: 13 September 1916 (Second Class: 26 December 1910; Third Class: 27 December 1902; Fourth Class: 28 June 1898; Fifth Class: 10 December 1895; Sixth Class: 29 December 1892)
- Order of the Rising Sun, Gold Rays with Neck Ribbon (then Third Class): 14 December 1903 (Fifth Class: 10 December 1895)

=== Foreign ===
- Order of the Precious Golden Grain, Second Class (Republic of China): 9 November 1915
