= Kyowa Party =

Kyowa Party 共和党 Kyōwatō
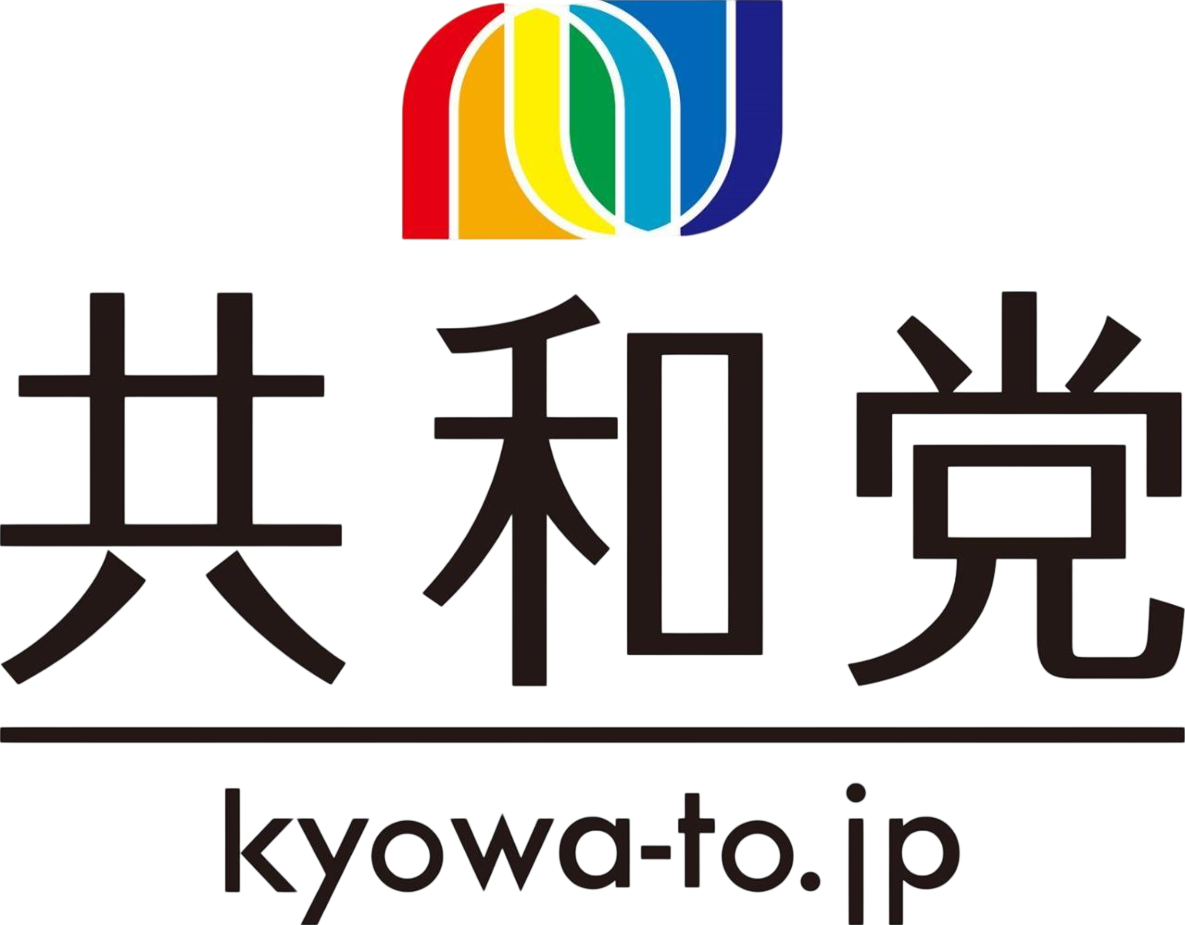
- Leader: Nobuhiko Shuto
- Founded: 14 July 2020
- Headquarters: 2-17-17 Nagatachō, Chiyoda, Tokyo, Japan
- Ideology: Communitarianism; Direct democracy
- Councillors: 0 / 242
- Representatives: 0 / 465
- Prefectural assembly members: 0 / 2,675
- City and town assembly members: 0 / 30,490

Website
- www.kyowa-to.jp www.kyowato.org

Kyowa Party (Japanese: 共和党, Kyōwatō, lit. 'Republican Party') is a political party in Japan founded by former Prime Minister and Democratic Party of Japan leader Yukio Hatoyama and former House of Representatives member Nobuhiko Shuto in 2020. Despite its name, the party did not seek to dissolve the Japanese monarchy.

== History ==
In October 2019, former Prime Minister and Democratic Party of Japan (DPJ) leader Yukio Hatoyama announced his intention to return to politics after his retirement in 2012. Hatoyama stated that he would grow the party to have 30 members in the National Diet by 2030. The party was officially launched on 14 July 2020 with Hatoyama as representative (代表) and former House of Representatives and DPJ member Nobuhiko Shuto as party leader (党首).

In June 2022, Hatoyama held a press conference and announced his intention to run in the next general election which is scheduled to take place on or before October 2025 in order to formally return to politics. The party also fielded two candidates in the 2022 House of Councillors election for Tokyo and Kanagawa at-large districts, but did not win any seats, receiving only 41,014 votes (0.08% of the popular vote).

Hatoyama left the party in September 2022.

== Election results ==
=== House of Councillors ===
Election	Leader	Seats		Nationwide		Prefecture		Status
Election	Leader	Total (Note: The Upper house is split in two classes, one elected every three years.)	Contested	Number	%	Number	%	Status
2022	Yukio Hatoyama	0 / 245	0 / 125			41,014	0.08%	Extra-parliamentary
