= Yukio Hatoyama =

Prime Minister of Japan from 2009 to 2010

- 鳩山 友紀夫
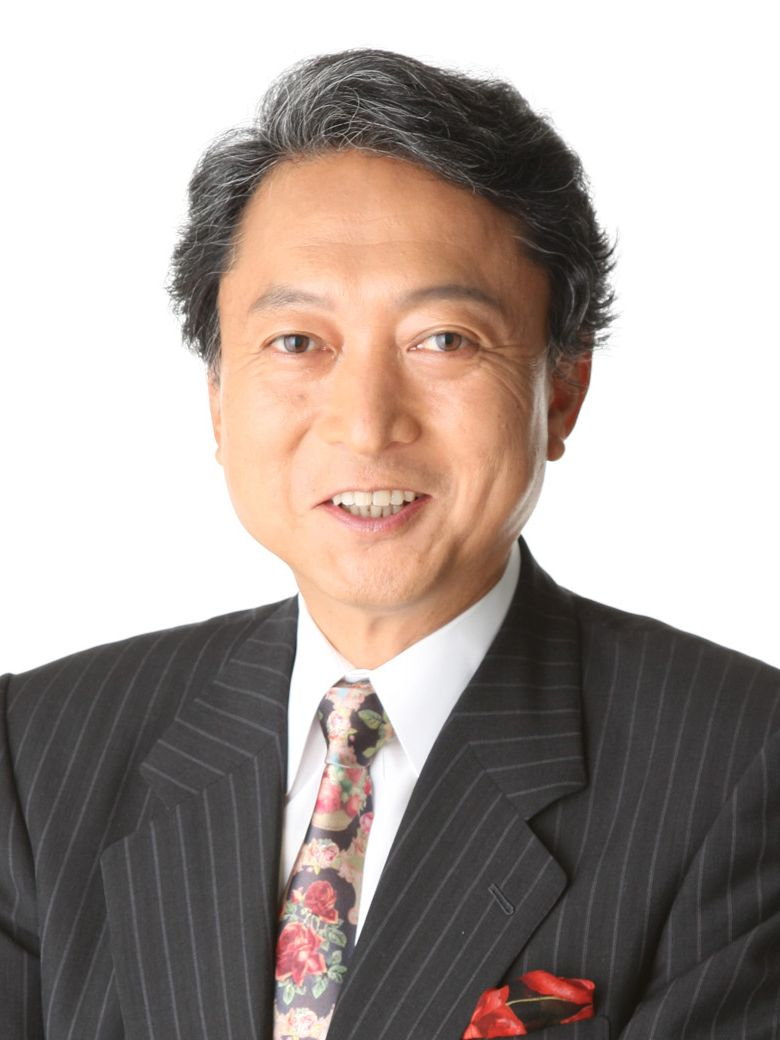
- Official portrait, 2007

Prime Minister of Japan
- In office 16 September 2009 – 8 June 2010
- Monarch: Akihito
- Deputy: Naoto Kan
- Preceded by: Tarō Asō
- Succeeded by: Naoto Kan

President of the Democratic Party of Japan
- In office 16 May 2009 – 4 June 2010
- Preceded by: Ichirō Ozawa
- Succeeded by: Naoto Kan
- In office 25 September 1999 – 10 December 2002
- Preceded by: Naoto Kan
- Succeeded by: Naoto Kan

Deputy Chief Cabinet Secretary (Political affairs)
- In office 9 August 1993 – 28 April 1994
- Prime Minister: Morihiro Hosokawa
- Preceded by: Motoji Kondō
- Succeeded by: Naoto Kitamura

Member of the House of Representatives
- In office 23 June 1986 – 16 December 2012
- Preceded by: Tadashi Kodaira
- Succeeded by: Manabu Horii
- Constituency: Hokkaido 4th (1986–1996); Hokkaido 9th (1996–2012)
- Majority: 122,345 (40.2%) (2009)

Personal details
- Born: 11 February 1947 (age 79) Bunkyō, Tokyo, Empire of Japan
- Party: Independent (2012–2020; 2022–present)
- Other political affiliations: LDP (before 1993); NPS (1993–1996); DP (1996–1998); DPJ (1998–2012); Kyowa (2020–2022)
- Spouse: Miyuki Hatoyama (m. 1975)
- Children: Kiichirō Hatoyama
- Parent(s): Iichirō Hatoyama; Yasuko Hatoyama
- Relatives: Hatoyama family
- Education: University of Tokyo (BE); Stanford University (PhD)
- Website: Official website

Yukio Hatoyama (鳩山 友紀夫, born 鳩山 由紀夫, Hatoyama Yukio; born 11 February 1947) is a retired Japanese politician who served as Prime Minister of Japan and leader of the Democratic Party of Japan from 2009 to 2010. He was the first Prime Minister from the party.

Coming from a prominent Japanese political family, Hatoyama was first elected to the House of Representatives in 1986 to represent the Hokkaido 9th district. He became President of the DPJ, the main opposition party, in May 2009. He then led the party to a landslide victory in the 2009 general election, defeating the long-governing Liberal Democratic Party (LDP), which had been in power for over a decade, becoming prime minister that year.

During his premiership, Hatoyama attempted spending cuts on public works projects. He also moved to change Japan's foreign policy from a United States-centric one to a more Asia-focused one. Hatoyama's premiership saw improved relations between China and Japan, as well as with Japan's other neighbors. Though initially enjoying high approval ratings, his popularity soon dropped due to various reasons including a finance scandal. In 2010, he announced his resignation as prime minister, citing breaking a campaign promise to close an American military base on the island of Okinawa.

In 2012, just before the LDP won the general elections in a landslide, Hatoyama announced his retirement from politics and did not run for re-election. Since then, he has made large online presence such as on Twitter with his outspoken political views. Hatoyama took part in founding the minor Kyowa Party in 2020, but later left the party.

== Early life and family ==
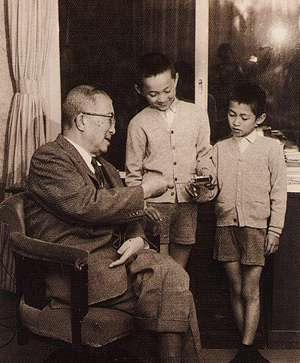
Ichirō Hatoyama and his two grandsons, Yukio and Kunio

Hatoyama comes from a prominent Japanese political family which has been likened to the Kennedy family of the United States.

Hatoyama, who was born in Bunkyō, Tokyo, is a fourth-generation politician. His paternal great-grandfather, Kazuo Hatoyama, was speaker of the House of Representatives of the Diet of Japan from 1896 to 1897 during the Meiji era. Kazuo later served as the president of Waseda University. His paternal great-grandmother, Haruko Hatoyama, was a co-founder of what is known today as Kyoritsu Women's University. His paternal grandfather, Ichirō Hatoyama, was a major politician; he served as Prime Minister and was a founder and the first President of the Liberal Democratic Party in 1956. As Prime Minister, he restored diplomatic relations with the Soviet Union, which cleared the way for Japan's membership in the United Nations.

Hatoyama is the son of Iichirō Hatoyama, who was Foreign Minister for a time. His mother, Yasuko Hatoyama, is a daughter of Shojiro Ishibashi, the founder of Bridgestone Corporation and heir to his significant inheritance. Yasuko Hatoyama is known as the "Godmother" within the Japanese political world for her financial contributions to both of her sons' political ambitions. In particular, Yasuko donated billions of yen when Kunio and Yukio co-created their previous Democratic Party of Japan (DPJ) in 1996 to help establish her sons' fledgling political party.

His younger brother, Kunio Hatoyama, served as Minister of Internal Affairs and Communications under Prime Minister Taro Aso until 12 June 2009. His younger sister-in-law Emily Hatoyama (鳩山エミリ) who is Kunio's wife, an Australian Japanese, was a TV personality in Japan.

Hatoyama graduated with a Bachelor of Engineering from the University of Tokyo in 1969 and received a PhD in Industrial Engineering from Stanford University in 1976. He met his wife, Miyuki Hatoyama, while studying at Stanford (Miyuki was working at a Japanese restaurant). The couple married in 1975 after Miyuki divorced her ex-husband. The couple's son, Kiichirō (紀一郎), graduated from the urban engineering department of the University of Tokyo, is a visiting engineering researcher at Moscow State University.

Hatoyama worked as assistant professor (1976–1981) at Tokyo Institute of Technology and later transferred to Senshu University as associate professor (1981–1984).

Hatoyama's son Kiichirō Hatoyama is married with two children. Kiichirō would later follow his father's footsteps into politics, elected in the 2024 general election.

== Political career ==
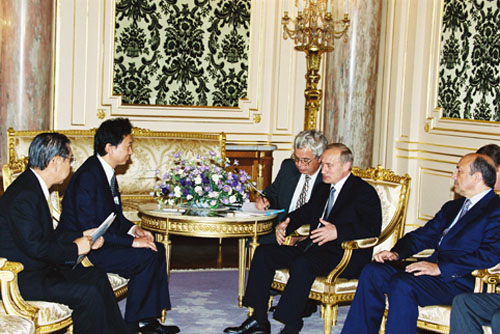
Hatoyama with Vladimir Putin (5 September 2000)

Hatoyama ran for a seat in the Hokkaido 9th District and was elected to the House of Representatives in 1986 representing the ruling LDP. In 1993 he left the LDP to form the New Party Sakigake with Naoto Kan, Masayoshi Takemura and Shūsei Tanaka (田中秀征). He and Kan then left to join the newly formed Democratic Party (Japan, 1996).

Hatoyama and his younger brother, Kunio Hatoyama, co-created the party, using billions of yen donated by their mother, Yasuko. Kunio Hatoyama eventually left the DPJ, saying the party had drifted too far to the left from its original centrist roots, and rejoined the Liberal Democratic Party (LDP). Yukio remained with the party through its merger with several other opposition parties in 1998.

The elder Hatoyama became the Democratic Party of Japan's chairman and leader of the opposition from 1999 to 2002, after which he resigned to take responsibility for the confusion that arose from rumors of mergers with Ichirō Ozawa's then Liberal Party. He was Secretary-General of the Democratic Party of Japan (DPJ) before he succeeded Ozawa as party leader following Ozawa's resignation on 11 May 2009. Hatoyama was chosen by fellow party representatives on 16 May 2009, winning 124 of the 219 votes and defeating rival Katsuya Okada.

Because of his quirky hairstyle, prominent eyes, and eccentric manner, he is known by his supporters and his opposition alike as "ET" or "The Alien", a nickname his wife states he earned because of how different he is from old-style Japanese politicians. Another nickname commonly used by the Japanese public in press was Popo, after a children's song about a pigeon that starts with the lyric "popopo, hato popo"; the first character in Hatoyama's last name is the Japanese word for 'pigeon'.

== Prime Minister (2009–2010) ==
Hatoyama entered his prime minister career with a high approval rating. The DPJ promised to end lavish spending on public works projects associated with LDP and to divert that money to tax cuts and subsidies for households. Expectations were high that he would break strongly with the policies of the LDP.

=== Domestic policy ===
Although Yukio Hatayoma was prime minister for less than a year, he had a wide range of achievements to his name by the time that he left office. Amongst his achievements included:

- The introduction of a state subsidy for families with young children.
- The abolition of public high school tuition fees.
- The introduction of an individual household income support project for rice farmers.
- The restoration of the Additional Living Support Allowance for Single-Mother Households.
- A big increase in social spending, with the social security budget, including spending on childrearing, nursing care, and medical care, increased by 9.8% as child allowances were introduced and the remuneration schedule for medical services was increased for the first time in ten years.
- An 8.2% increase in the education budget.
- An expansion in the student scholarship system to cover more students.
- The extension of employment insurance to all workers.
- A reduction in medical expenses for unemployed persons.
- The elimination of age-discriminatory practices in remuneration schedules and medical services.
- The expansion of assistance for the "development of public rental housing with annexed facilities for supporting the elderly and childrearing households" to include "public rental housing with annexed medical facilities".
- The introduction of free welfare services and equipment for low-income persons with disabilities.

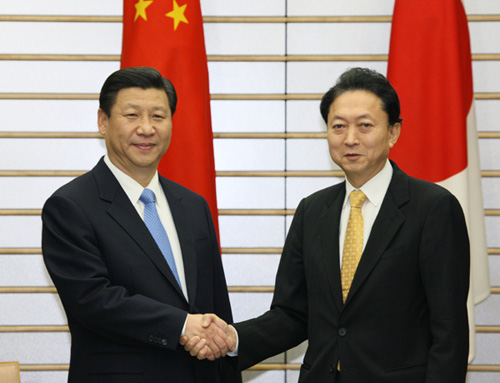
Hatoyama meeting with Chinese Vice President Xi Jinping on 14 December 2009

In December 2009, a finance scandal caused a drop in Hatoyama's popularity. It was revealed that Hatoyama received $4 million in donations that were improperly reported. Most of the money was given by his mother, a wealthy heiress, and some of the reported givers had the names of deceased people. The scandal raised questions about his credibility while also highlighting his privileged background. However, according to NHK in 2010 prosecutors chose not to pursue him citing insufficient evidence of criminal activity, although a secretary was given a suspended prison sentence, and a review panel commented: "it is difficult to believe Hatoyama's assertion he was unaware of the falsifications."

In December, the DPJ created a government task force to review government spending and pledged to make cuts equal to $32.8 billion. However, the task force cut only a quarter of that amount. Hatoyama even had to renege on a campaign promise to cut road-related taxes – including a highly symbolic gasoline tax and highway tolls. Hatoyama faced criticism from fringes of his own party, some calling for a return to public works spending.

=== Foreign policy ===
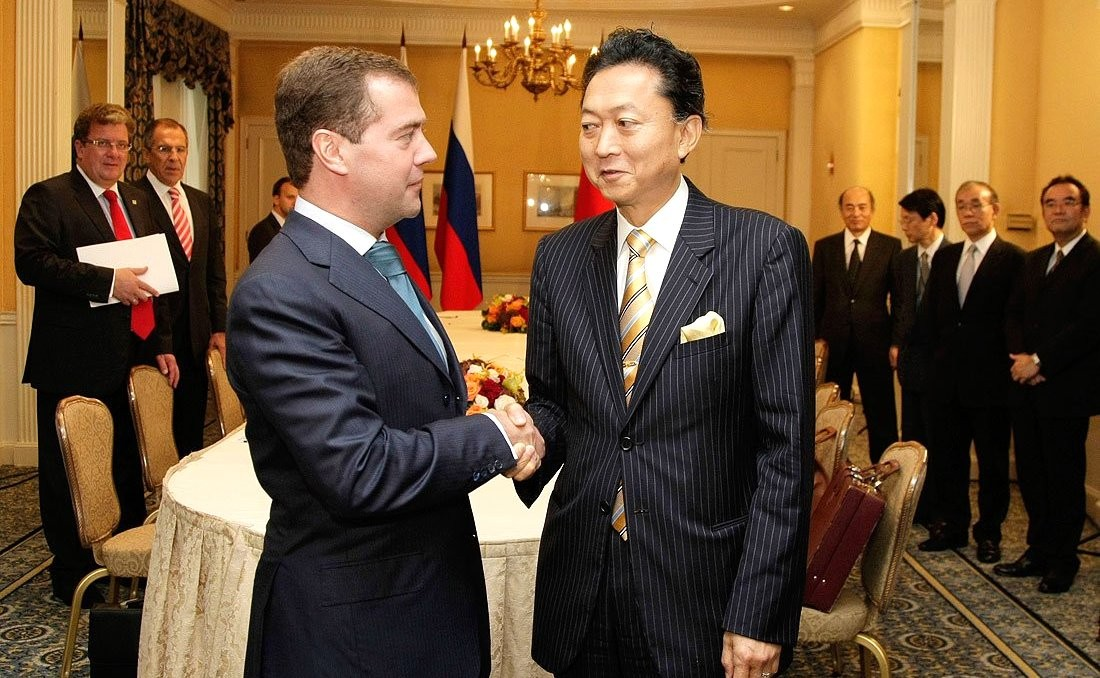
Hatoyama with Dmitry Medvedev (23 September 2009)

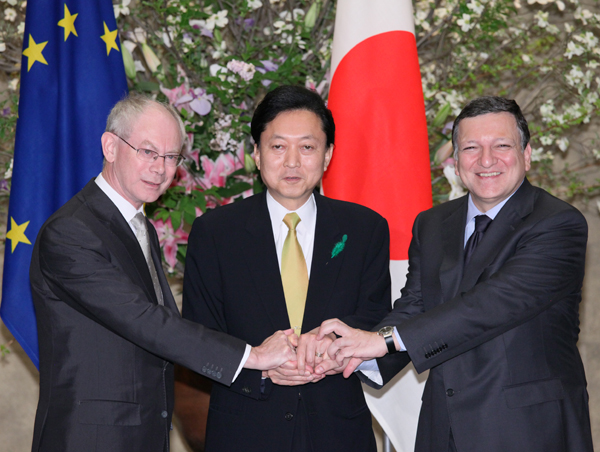
Hatoyama with Herman Van Rompuy and José Manuel Barroso (at the EU–Japan Summit on 28 April 2010)

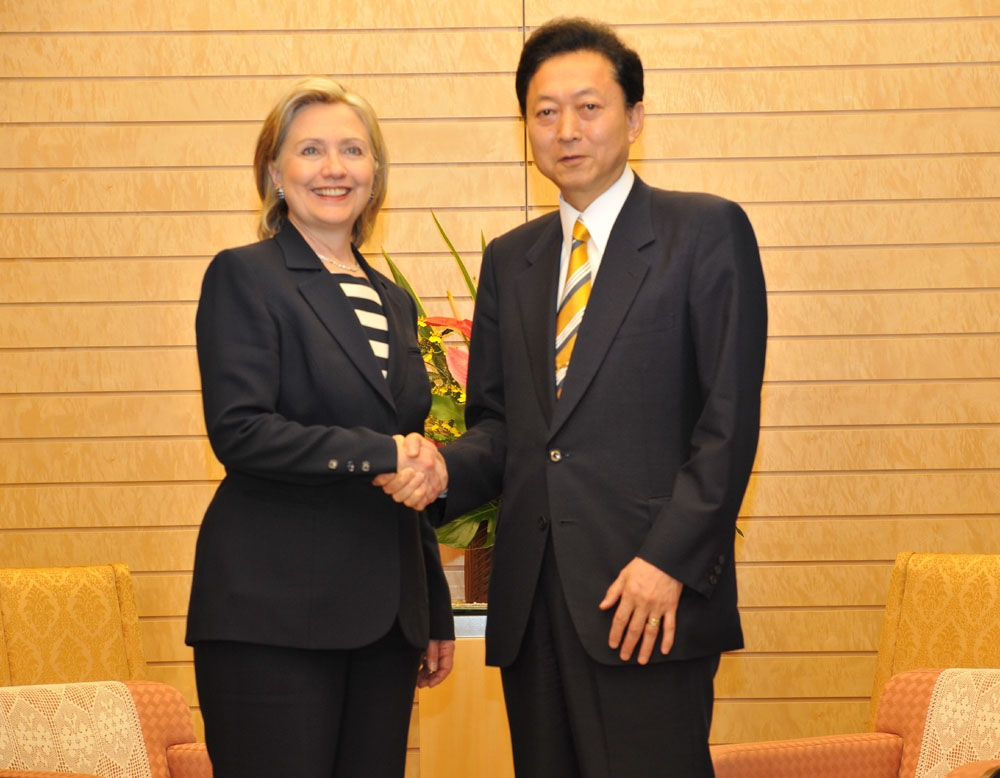
Hatoyama with Hillary Clinton (at the Prime Minister's Official Residence on 21 May 2010)

Hatoyama, representing the policies DPJ campaigned on, wanted to shift Japan's focus from a more America-centric foreign policy to a more Asia-focused policy. Also, he wanted to make foreign policy decisions with America more transparent, from a popular perception that Japanese foreign policy was determined by insiders behind closed doors.

The DPJ's election platform called for re-examining its ties with the United States. As the 1960 Japan–U.S. security treaty entered its 50th year, Hatoyama called for a "close and equal" Japan–U.S. relationship, which meant more independence for Japan's role. Hatoyama ended an eight-year refueling mission in Afghanistan, a highly symbolic move because the mission had long been criticized for violating the nation's pacifist Constitution. In order not to anger Washington, Hatoyama offered $5 billion in civilian aid for Afghanistan reconstruction.

Hatoyama was also faced with the issue of the relocation of the American Futenma Marine Corps Air Base. The United States government hoped that Hatoyama would honor a 2006 agreement to relocate the base to a less populated part of Okinawa and move 8,000 marines to Guam. Some voices in the DPJ demanded that America move its military bases off Okinawa islands altogether. Hatoyama was torn between public opinion on Okinawa and the desire to retain strong ties with Washington.

In moving towards a more Asia-centered foreign policy, Hatoyama worked towards making relations better with nearby East Asian countries, even saying "the Japanese Islands don't belong to only Japanese". Hatoyama worked to deepen economic integration with the East Asian region, pushing for a free trade zone in Asia by 2020 and proposing Haneda airport as a 24-hour hub for international flights. In January 2010, he welcomed South Korea's president, calling for 'future-oriented' ties, as opposed to recalling the past, in which Japan colonized Korea.

Relations with China also warmed under Hatoyama. The first few months saw an exchange of visits, including one by favored successor to China's leadership Xi Jinping, for whom Hatoyama hastily arranged an appointment with Emperor Akihito. On 7 January, the Daily Yomiuri reported high-level discussion over a further exchange of visits between the two countries to promote reconciliation over historical issues. "Beijing aims to ease anti-Japan sentiment among the Chinese public by having Hatoyama visit Nanjing and express a sense of regret about the Sino-Japanese War", the paper reported.

=== Resignation ===
Hatoyama's popularity soon began to falter after the DPJ struggled to meet the high expectations they set in the midst of a sliding economy. In May 2010 he faced a possible no confidence vote, On 2 June 2010, Hatoyama announced his resignation as Prime Minister before a meeting of the Japanese Democratic Party. He cited breaking a campaign promise to close an American military base on the island of Okinawa as the main reason for the move. On 28 May 2010, soon after and because of increased tensions from the sinking of a South Korean navy ship allegedly by North Korea, Hatoyama had made a deal with U.S. President Barack Obama to retain the base for security reasons, but the deal was unpopular in Japan. He also mentioned money scandals involving a top party leader, Ichirō Ozawa, who resigned as well, in his decision to step down. Hatoyama had been pressed to leave by members of his party after doing poorly in polls in anticipation of an upper house election in July 2010.

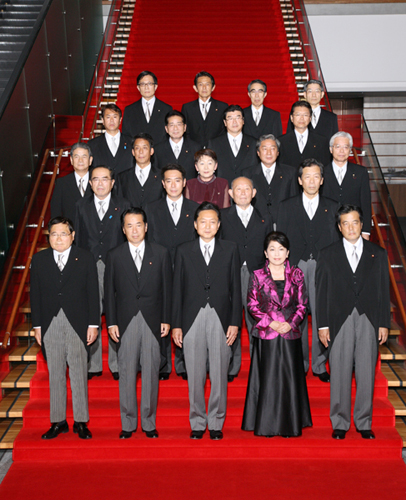
Ministers of Hatoyama Government (at the Prime Minister's Official Residence on 16 September 2009)

== Post-premiership ==
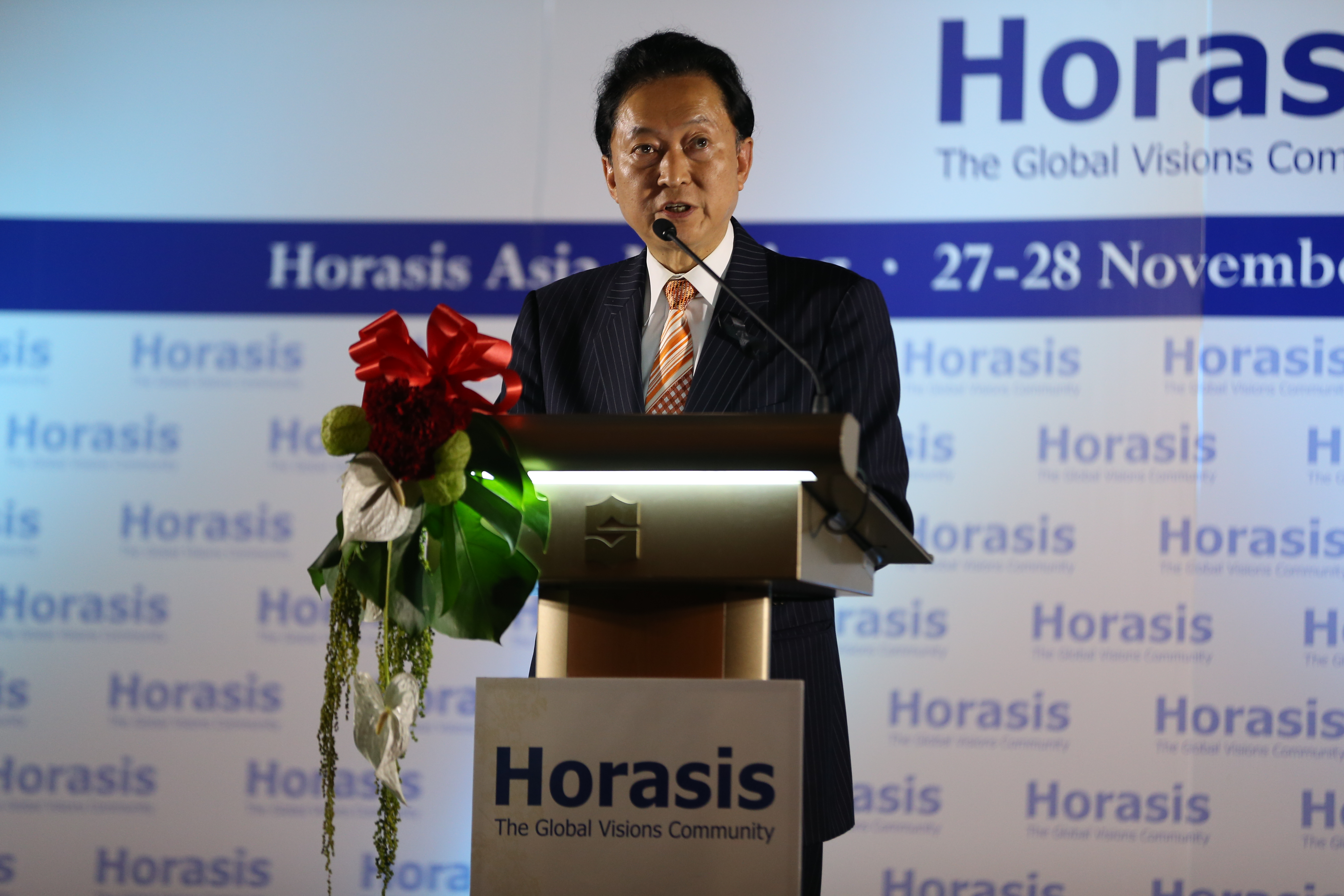
Yukio Hatoyama at the Horasis Asia Meeting in November 2016

After stepping down as prime minister, Hatoyama continued to serve as a DPJ diet member. When Prime Minister Yoshihiko Noda introduced legislation to raise the consumption tax from 5% to 10% Hatoyama was one of 57 DPJ lower house lawmakers who voted against the bill. His membership in the DPJ was suspended for six months, subsequently reduced to three. Unlike some of the tax rioters, Hatoyama did not leave the DPJ to join Ichiro Ozawa's People's Life First party, but continued to act within the DPJ to fight against both the consumption tax increase and the restart of nuclear plants. On 20 July 2012 he addressed a crowd of protesters outside the prime minister's residence, saying it was premature to restart nuclear reactors.

In the lead-up to the 16 December 2012 general election the DPJ announced that it would not endorse candidates who did not agree to follow its current policies, including the consumption tax hike and support for joining the negotiations to enter the Trans-Pacific Partnership. On 21 November Hatoyama proclaimed that he would retire from politics. On 9 January 2013, Hatoyama expressed a government apology to the victims of Japanese war crimes in China during a visit to Nanjing. He also urged the Japanese government to acknowledge the dispute between the two countries concerning sovereignty of the Diaoyu/Senkaku Islands. On 21 March 2013, Hatoyama was appointed as the honorary chairman and a senior consultant of Hoifu Energy Group.

In March 2015, Hatoyama visited Crimea and claimed that the referendum in Crimea was "constitutional." In August 2015, Hatoyama visited the Seodaemun Prison History Hall, where he knelt and bowed before a memorial to Korean independence activists killed by Japan during 1905-1945. He expressed his remorse for Japan's occupation of Korea. Hatoyama practices the Transcendental Meditation technique and delivered the Maharishi University of Management commencement address on 23 May 2015 and was awarded an honorary degree of Doctor of Laws.

Hatoyama continues to display his outspokenness after his retirement from politics. He is one of the most followed Japanese current/ex-politicians on Twitter and still regularly weighs in on current affairs. In 2023, he falsely claimed on Twitter that Ukraine was planning to launch a nuclear attack on Russia. He later apologized for what he said was a translation issue. In 2020, Hatoyama formed the Kyowa Party together with Nobuhiko Shuto He announced his intention to run for office in the next election. His former DPJ colleagues expressed irritation with him for claiming to form a party without any clear base of political allies. He stepped down from the party in September 2022. His son Kiichirō was elected to the House of Representatives as a candidate of the Democratic Party For the People in the 2024 election.

On 3 September 2025, Hatoyama attended the 2025 China Victory Day Parade among other current and former world leaders. On 20 November, amidst the China–Japan diplomatic crisis, Hatoyama criticized remarks Prime Minister Sanae Takaichi's statements regarding a possible Taiwan contingency as going in the "wrong direction" that caused "immeasurable" damage to Japan's national interests, and urged the government to "stop the bleeding" before relations with China deteriorate beyond repair.

On 28 April 2026, he attended and gave a speech at an event of the University of Hong Kong’s School of Governance and Policy, where he said "I would argue that Japan and China should jointly confront a self-centred United States and [prevent] the collapse of the world order". In the context of the 2025–2026 China–Japan diplomatic crisis, Hatoyama stated "The Chinese government should carefully calculate its messaging to Japan," and added "Even if China intends to criticise the right-wing Japanese politicians and parties, the Japanese public perceives it as China is a frightening country that interferes in the internal affairs of other nations", stating "Right-wing politicians exploit these public sentiments to push for a hostile policy towards China". He also called for more people-to-people exchanges between China and Japan.

== Awards and honors ==
=== Sustainable Development Leadership Award ===
On 5 February 2010, Hatoyama was awarded the Sustainable Development Leadership Award of the Delhi Sustainable Development Summit 2010. The reason for the award was "his effort to confront climate change and leading his government to make it a main issue".

=== Time 100 ===
In 2010, Time magazine's "Time 100" elected Hatoyama as No. 6 among the 100 most influential people in the world. It said Hatoyama had "helped change his country from a de facto one-party state into a functional democracy", through the DPJ victory in the 2009 general election.

== See also ==
- Hatoyama Hall

== Election history ==
Election	Age	District	Political party	Number of votes	election results
1986 Japanese general election	39	Hokkaido 4th district	LDP	93,001	winning
1990 Japanese general election	43	Hokkaido 4th district	LDP	85,516	winning
1993 Japanese general election	46	Hokkaido 4th district	NPS	111,824	winning
1996 Japanese general election	49	Hokkaido 9th district	DPJ	131,936	winning
2000 Japanese general election	53	Hokkaido 9th district	DPJ	131,500	winning
2003 Japanese general election	56	Hokkaido 9th district	DPJ	141,442	winning
2005 Japanese general election	58	Hokkaido 9th district	DPJ	150,050	winning
2009 Japanese general election	62	Hokkaido 9th district	DPJ	201,461	winning

== Bibliography ==
- Itoh, Mayumi (2003). The Hatoyama Dynasty: Japanese Political Leadership through the Generations. New York: Palgrave Macmillan. ISBN 1-403-96331-2, ISBN 978-1-403-96331-4. OCLC 248918078.
- Hofmann, Reto (2019). "The conservative imaginary: moral re-armament and the internationalism of the Japanese right, 1945–1962". Japan Forum. 33 (1): 77–102. doi:10.1080/09555803.2019.1646785. ISSN 0955-5803. S2CID 202261053.

Party political offices
New political party	Leader of the Democratic Party; 1996–1997; Served alongside: Naoto Kan	Succeeded by Naoto Kan
Preceded by Naoto Kan	President of the Democratic Party; 1999–2002	Succeeded by Naoto Kan
Preceded by Ichirō Ozawa	President of the Democratic Party; 2009–2010	Succeeded by Naoto Kan
Political offices
Preceded by Taro Aso	Prime Minister of Japan; 2009–2010	Succeeded by Naoto Kan
