= Shōjirō Ishibashi =

Japanese businessman and the founder of Bridgestone Corporation

- 石橋 正二郎
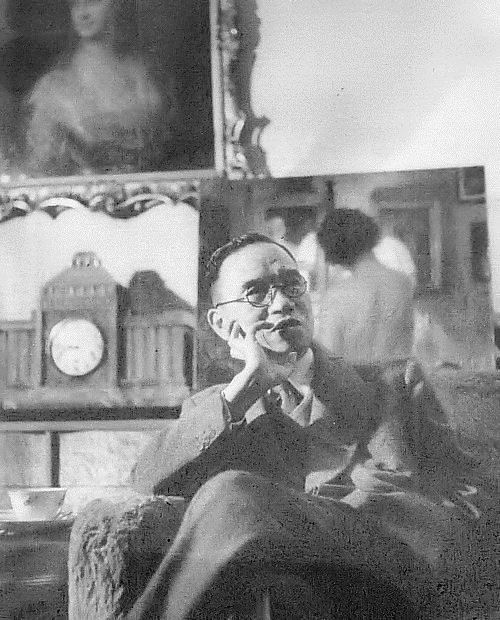
- Shōjirō Ishibashi in 1952
- Born: February 1, 1889; Kurume, Japan
- Died: September 11, 1976 (aged 87); Kyoto, Japan
- Occupation: Founder of Bridgestone Corporation
- Relatives: Kunio Hatoyama (grandson); Yukio Hatoyama (grandson)

Shōjirō Ishibashi (石橋 正二郎, Ishibashi Shōjirō; February 1, 1889 – September 11, 1976) was a Japanese businessman who founded the Bridgestone Corporation, the world's largest maker of tires, in 1931 in the city of Kurume, Fukuoka, Japan. The company was named after its founder: in the Japanese language, ishi means "stone" and hashi (here voiced to bashi) means "bridge", whence the origin of the company's name in English.

After the end of the Second World War and the subsequent occupation of Japan, Ishibashi became extensively embroiled in Japanese politics. Ishibashi was close to Ichiro Hatoyama, who was a rival to prime minister Shigeru Yoshida. Ishibashi became an advisor to Hatoyama on Japan's post-war economic development, expressing his views on the economic policy of the parties of Hatoyama's political affiliation.

Ishibashi's daughter, Yasuko Hatoyama, became heir to Ishibashi's considerable fortune and has used the inheritance to fund her family's political causes. She married former Japanese Foreign Minister Iichirō Hatoyama. The couple had two sons, who are Ishibashi's grandchildren – politicians Kunio Hatoyama, who served as Minister of Internal Affairs and Communications, and Yukio Hatoyama, who was Prime Minister from 2009 to 2010.

Ishibashi's motto for Bridgestone was to "serve society with products of superior quality". He founded Ishibashi Cultural Center and the Bridgestone Museum of Art (also located at 10 Kyobashi 1-chome, Chuo-ku, Tokyo 104) and was a major benefactor of the Tokyo National Museum of Modern Art, having also constructed the building in which it is housed.

== Prince Motor Company ==
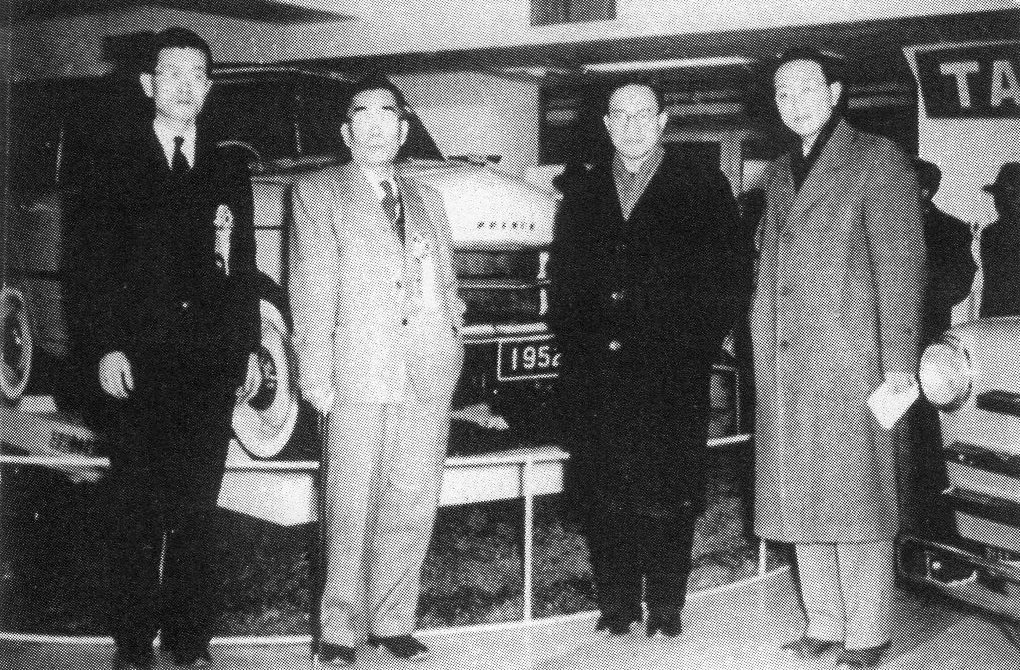
Tama Motor Company (later renamed as Prince Motor Company) executives at the exhibition show of the Prince vehicles held at the Bridgestone headquarters in Kyobashi, Tokyo in March 1952. From left to right, Tamotsu Toyama (executive director. Former prototype aircraft workshop manager of Tachikawa Aircraft Company), Satoichiro Suzuki (president), Shojiro Ishibashi (chairman of Tama Motors and the president of Bridgestone) and Kanichiro Ishibashi (executive director. Son of Shojiro Ishibashi).

Ishibashi made sure of the birth and the end of the Prince Motor Company.

- February 1949 – Ishibashi financed the Tokyo Electric Car Company (one of the successors of the Tachikawa Aircraft Company) and became the Chairperson of the Board.
- November 1949 – Tokyo Electric Car changed its name to Tama Electric Car Company.
- November 1950 – Tama Electric Car ordered the new gasoline engine from the Fuji Precision Industries (one of the successors of the disbanded Nakajima Aircraft Company).
- April 1951 – Ishibashi bought most of the stock of the Fuji Precision Industries and became the Chairperson of the Board. At this time, Ishibashi owned both Tokyo Electric Car and Fuji Precision.
- November 1951 – Tama Electric Car changed its name to the Tama Motor Company.
- November 1952 – Tama Motor Company changed its name to the Prince Motor Company.
- April 1954 – Prince Motor Company was merged into Fuji Precision. (Prior to this, two of them were owned by Ishibashi.)
- February 1961 – Fuji Precision returned its name to Prince Motor Company again.
- May 1965 – Ishibashi (the owner of Prince), Hidehiko Ogawa (the president of Prince) and Katsuji Kawamata (the president of Nissan) signed a merger memorandum.
- August 1966 – Prince was merged into Nissan.
