= Emily Hatoyama =

Japanese actor and model

- 鳩山 エミリー
- Born: Emily Takami; 11 February 1955 (age 71); Tokyo, Japan
- Other name: Emily Jane Beard
- Occupations: Actress, model, essayist
- Years active: 1966–present
- Spouse: Kunio Hatoyama (m. 1973; died 2016)
- Children: 3, including Taro and Jirō
- Parent(s): Jimmy K. Beard; Sadako Takami
- Relatives: Hatoyama family

Emily Hatoyama (鳩山 エミリー, Hatoyama Emirī; née Takami (高見); born 11 February 1955) is a Japanese essayist and former actress and model. She was the wife of Kunio Hatoyama, the Minister for Internal Affairs and Communications under Prime Minister Tarō Asō.

== Early life and family ==
Hatoyama was born to a Japanese mother, Sadako Takami and Australian father, J. K. (Jimmy) Beard, a sergeant in the Australian Army who had been stationed in Japan as part of the British Commonwealth Occupation Force. While some sources state that the family was forced to remain in Japan because the Australian government barred immigration by Japanese people, that particular barrier was removed several years before Hatoyama was born. In fact, Beard worked for a trading company in Japan after leaving the Army.

== Entertainment career ==
Hatoyama began working as a child model during the 1960s, as both Emily Takami (高見 エミリー, Takami Emirii) – her mother's maiden surname – and Emily Jane Beard. This included being a cover model for Shōjo Friend by Kodansha, Hatoyama started working as an actress during the 1970s and made her debut as a singer in 1972.

Hatoyama's older sister, Marjorie Beard, also worked as an actress, under the name Risa Takami, in Toei movies and commercials during the mid-1960s. She married Hiroshi Ishibashi, grandson of Bridgestone founder Shōjirō Ishibashi.

== Marriage ==
At the wedding of her older sister she first met Kunio Hatoyama, a first cousin of the groom and a grandson Prime Minister Ichirō Hatoyama. Emily was engaged to Kunio Hatoyama at the age of 17 in February 1973. She retired from acting and modeling after her marriage. The couple had three children. Emily's popularity contributed to Kunio's first election to the House of Representatives in 1976.

== Selected filmography ==
=== Films ===
- Ōgon Bat (1966)

=== TV series ===
- Kamen Rider (1972)
