= Jiro Hatoyama =

Japanese politician (born 1979)

- 鳩山 二郎
- Official portrait, 2024

Member of the House of Representatives
- Incumbent
- Assumed office 25 October 2016
- Preceded by: Kunio Hatoyama
- Constituency: Fukuoka 6th

Mayor of Ōkawa
- In office 23 July 2013 – 9 September 2016
- Preceded by: Mitsuharu Ueki
- Succeeded by: Ryōichi Kurashige

Personal details
- Born: 1 January 1979 (age 47) Bunkyō, Tokyo, Japan
- Party: Liberal Democratic
- Parent(s): Kunio Hatoyama; Emily Takami
- Relatives: Hatoyama family
- Education: Kyorin University

Jiro Hatoyama (鳩山二郎, Hatoyama Jiro; born 1 January 1979) is a Japanese politician serving as a member of the House of Representatives since 2016. From 2013 to 2016, he served as mayor of Ōkawa. He is the son of Kunio Hatoyama and Emily Hatoyama.
