= Hideo Hatoyama =

Japanese jurist (1884–1946)

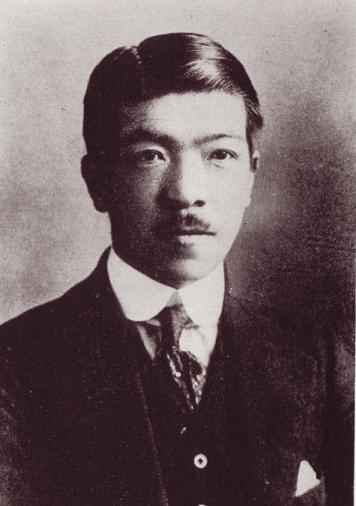
Hatoyama Hideo

Hideo Hatoyama (2 February 1884 – 29 January 1946) was a Japanese jurist whose writings about civil law were influential in pre-World War II Japan.

Hatoyama was part of the prominent Hatoyama family. His father Kazuo Hatoyama was speaker of the House of Representatives of Japan during the Meiji era, and his brother Ichirō Hatoyama was an influential politician and minister in the 1930s and 40s. Through him, Hideo Hatoyama was able to exert great influence on Japanese jurisprudence.

After graduating from Tokyo Imperial University in 1908 and subsequent graduate studies in France and Germany, he taught law at his alma mater from 1916 to 1926, after which he worked as a lawyer and left his professorship to his student Sakae Wagatsuma. Hatoyama wrote influential treatises and textbooks on legal transactions (1910) and the law of obligations (1916), but his ideas fell out of fashion after Izotaro Suehiro's attacks on German-style jurisprudence of concepts.

Fluent in English, Hatoyama was a member of the Anglican Church in Japan and for many years served as the elected warden of St. Barnabas' Church in Ushigome.
