= Kyoritsu Women's University =

Japanese private women's university

Coordinates: 35°41′36.7″N 139°45′28.8″E

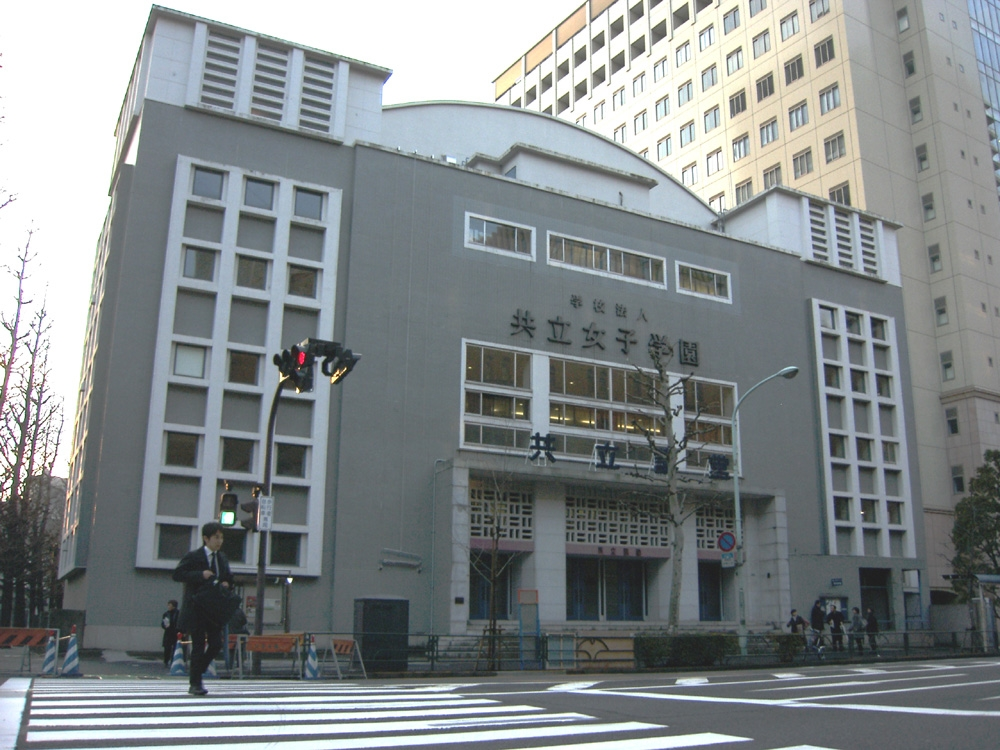
Kyoritsu Kodo at Kyoritsu Women's University.

Kyoritsu Women's University (共立女子大学, Kyōritsu joshi daigaku) is a private women's college in Chiyoda, Tokyo, Japan, established in 1949.

== History ==
The vocational predecessor of the school was founded in 1886. The name "Kyoritsu", meaning "standing together" in Japanese, came from the fact that 34 people were involved in the foundation of the school; among them were educator Haruko Hatoyama, Kyuichiro Nagai (the father of writer Kafu Nagai), and educator Seiichi Tejima.

=== Mission ===
The founding of Kyoritsu marked the very beginning of women's higher education in Japan: To recognize the need to "educate modern women in knowledge and skills, and to elevate the position of women in society."

== Facilities ==
Kyoritsu Kodo is the school's 2,010-capacity auditorium. The auditorium has been used for concerts, hosting bands such as Free, James Gang and Yes.

== Exchanges ==
The university has established exchanges and links with other international institutions of higher education—for example, the University of Pennsylvania

== Notable associates ==
=== Faculty ===
Kaoru Hatoyama was a schoolmaster at the university founded by her mother-in-law, Haruko. (Kaoru was the wife of Ichirō Hatoyama, who was the 52nd, 53rd and 54th Prime Minister of Japan.)

Kyoritsu Girls' School alumni and a contemporary of Kaoru, Asa Matsuoka often lectured at the school in the 1930s and 1940s.

=== Alumni ===
- Noriko Iriyama, actress
- Makiko Kuno, actress
- Yoko Moriguchi, actress
- Yuka Kuramochi, actress, gravure idol, and Internet personality
- Naoko Takeuchi, artist

== Notes ==
- Kobayashi, Kei, Tetsurō Kitamura, Noriyuki Ito and Maki Tamada. (1992). American antique quilt collection (アメリカン・アンティークキルトコレクション, Amerikan anteikū kiruto korekuskiyon). Tokyo: Nihon Vogue. OCLC 28872477
