= Iichirō Hatoyama =

Japanese politician and diplomat (1918–1993)

- 鳩山 威一郎
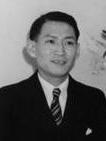
- Hatoyama in 1953

Minister for Foreign Affairs
- In office 24 December 1976 – 28 November 1977
- Prime Minister: Takeo Fukuda
- Preceded by: Zentarō Kosaka
- Succeeded by: Sunao Sonoda

Member of the House of Councillors
- In office 7 July 1974 – 7 July 1992
- Constituency: National district (1974–1986); National PR (1986–1992)

Personal details
- Born: 11 November 1918 Tokyo City, Japan
- Died: 19 December 1993 (aged 75) Tokyo, Japan
- Party: Liberal Democratic
- Spouse: Yasuko Hatoyama
- Relations: Hatoyama family
- Children: Kunio; Yukio
- Parent: Ichirō Hatoyama (father)
- Education: University of Tokyo

Military service
- Allegiance: Empire of Japan
- Branch/service: Imperial Japanese Navy
- Battles/wars: World War II

Iichirō Hatoyama (鳩山 威一郎, Hatoyama Iichirō; November 11, 1918 – December 19, 1993) was a Japanese politician and diplomat. Between 1976 and 1977, he served as Foreign Minister under Prime Minister Takeo Fukuda. He was the son and father of two former Prime Ministers, Ichirō and Yukio respectively.

== Early years ==
Hatoyama was born in Tokyo to Ichirō Hatoyama, who was prime minister of Japan and the founder of the Liberal Democratic Party.

Iichirō graduated from the University of Tokyo’s Faculty of Law in 1941. Upon graduation, he began working for the Ministry of Finance and served in the navy during the Second World War as part of a programme that offered a shortened period of service to young, educated individuals in roles considered essential to the country. In the navy, he worked within the budget bureau. In 1942, he married Yasuko Ishibashi, daughter of the founder of the tyre manufacturing company Bridgestone.

At end of the war, Iichirō was one of 6.6 million Japanese military personnel and civilians who were stranded overseas. At the time, this was about 8 percent of Japan's entire population. Iichirō was unable to return home until December 31, 1945.

== Career ==
In 1946, he returned to the Ministry of Finance and began making a place for himself in the meritocracy of the Budget Bureau. In this work, he caught the attention of men like Takeo Fukuda, who would figure prominently in later life.

In due course, Iichirō was promoted to the position of Deputy Director General in 1963; and he became Director General in 1965. He served as administrative Vice Minister in the Finance Ministry from 1971 to 1972. The position of vice minister is the highest rank in the civil service, comparable to that of "permanent secretary" in the British civil service or "undersecretary" in the civil service of the United States government. The minister is always a politician.

After Iichirō's retirement in 1974, he gave in to long-standing family pressure; and his career in politics began with his election to the House of Councilors (HC) in the Diet.

The capstone of his political career was the period in which he served as Foreign Minister in 1976–1977.

== Family ==
Iichirō Hatoyama (center) flanked by his two sons, Yukio (left) and Kunio (right), taken at the time when all three were independently elected as members of the Diet of Japan. Iichirō had been in the House of Councilors since 1974; his younger son, Kunio, had been in the House of Representatives of Japan since 1976; and his older son, Yukio, was first elected to the lower house in 1986.

Iichirō was the eldest son of Ichirō Hatoyama, who was the Prime Minister of Japan in 1955-1956. His grandfather Kazuo Hatoyama was Speaker of the House of Representative in the first Imperial Diet. Despite family pressure, he was interested in building a life outside the arena of Japanese politics; and his sons also grew to become independent-minded men.

Iichirō is the father of Yukio Hatoyama, who was the former Prime Minister, following a win by the opposition coalition in the 2009 elections.

His wife, Yasuko Hatoyama, is a daughter of Shojiro Ishibashi, the founder of Bridgestone Corporation. The couple have two sons. Kunio Hatoyama, like his brother Yukio, may be described as a fourth generation politician and most recently the Minister of Internal Affairs and Communications.

The Hatoyamas have been described in the media as the "Kennedys of Japan".

== See also ==
- Hatoyama (disambiguation)
- Hatoyama Hall

== Notes ==
Political offices
Preceded by Zentaro Kosaka	Minister of Foreign Affairs; 1976–1977	Succeeded by Sunao Sonoda
