= Miyuki Hatoyama =

Japanese actress (born 1943)

- 鳩山 幸
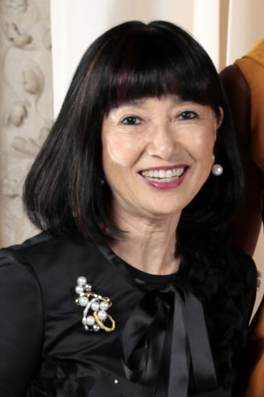
- Hatoyama in 2009

Spouse of the Prime Minister of Japan
- In role 16 September 2009 – 8 June 2010
- Monarch: Akihito
- Prime Minister: Yukio Hatoyama
- Preceded by: Chikako Asō
- Succeeded by: Nobuko Kan

Personal details
- Born: 28 June 1943 (age 82) Shanghai, China
- Spouse: Yukio Hatoyama (m. 1975)
- Children: Kiichirō Hatoyama
- Occupation: Actress

Miyuki Hatoyama (鳩山 幸, Hatoyama Miyuki; born June 28, 1943) is married to the former Prime Minister of Japan, Yukio Hatoyama. Originally an actress by profession, Hatoyama later worked as a stylist, interior designer and cookbook author.

In an interview, then Prime Minister-designate Yukio Hatoyama credited Miyuki with his professional success and praised her enthusiasm. Hatoyama indicated that Miyuki would take an unusually prominent role for the wife of a Japanese prime minister during his administration.

== Biography ==
=== Early life ===
Hatoyama was born on 28 June 1943 in Shanghai, China, to devout Protestant parents while the city was under Japanese occupation during World War II. She was raised in the Japanese city of Kobe.

=== Career ===
Hatoyama was an actress in the all-female Takarazuka Revue during the 1960s. She quit the troupe and her stage career when she was in her mid-20s and moved to the United States.

Hatoyama has authored a number of cookbooks. Among her books authored is Spiritual Food, which focuses on Hawaiian macrobiotic recipes. She has since published another book titled Very Strange Things I've Encountered. In the book, she claims "While my body was asleep, I think my soul rode on a triangular-shaped UFO and went to Venus... It was a very beautiful place, and it was very green." She wrote that her ex-husband told her it was "probably just a dream" but that Yukio would "surely say, 'Oh, that's great.'"

=== Marriage and family ===
Miyuki met her future husband, Yukio Hatoyama, in San Francisco, California, while Yukio was a student at Stanford University. Miyuki and Yukio married in 1975, after Miyuki divorced her previous husband, a restaurateur. The couple has one son, Kiichiro, who as of 2009 was an engineering researcher studying in Russia.

=== Personal life ===
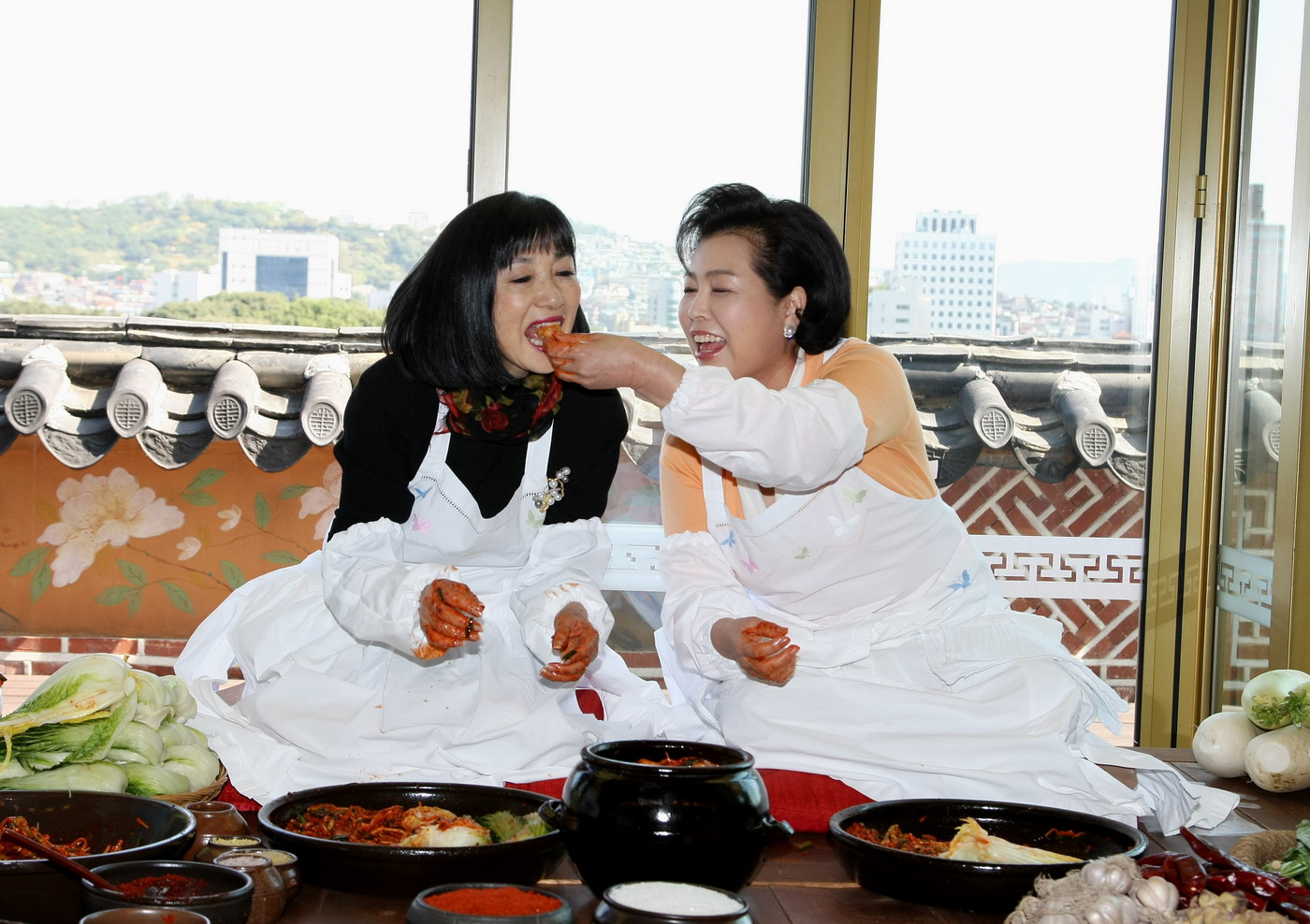
Kim Yoon-ok, First Lady of South Korea serves kimchi to Miyuki Hatoyama.

Hatoyama often appears on Japanese talk shows, discussing a range of topics including food, religion and politics. She has listed her interests as picking vegetables, pottery and creating art from stained glass. Hatoyama appeared on a Japanese talk show wearing a shirt made from coffee sacks which she acquired in Hawaii. In another interview, she claimed that she knew Tom Cruise in a former incarnation – when he was Japanese – and is now looking forward to making a Hollywood movie with him. "I believe he'd get it if I said to him, 'Long time no see', when we meet." She has also claimed to "eat the sun" every day to gain energy. and that her "soul went to Venus while her "body was asleep".

An avid hallyu fan, Hatoyama has often mentioned her love of Korean culture, especially South Korean drama and cuisine. She has even stated that her youthful appearance can be attributed to watching South Korean drama and claims to eat kimchi every day with her husband. Some have commented that her enthusiasm for all things Korean has helped improve relations between Japan and South Korea. When Hatoyama visited the country with her husband for an official state visit in October 2009, she received applause from the crowd as she walked down the street in Seoul's Insadong area.

She has served as her husband's chief stylist and image coordinator during his political career and campaign during the 2009 general election. Hatoyama coordinates what her husband wears for public events and styles his hair.

Unofficial roles
| Preceded by Chikako Asō | Spouse of the Prime Minister of Japan; 2009–2010 | Succeeded by Nobuko Kan |
