= Yasuko Hatoyama =

Yasuko Hatoyama (鳩山 安子, Hatoyama Yasuko; 11 September 1922 – 11 February 2013) was the wife of former Japanese Foreign Minister Iichirō Hatoyama and mother of former Prime Minister of Japan Yukio Hatoyama and Diet (Japan's bicameral legislature) member Kunio Hatoyama. Hatoyama funded the establishment of the Democratic Party of Japan (DPJ).

== Background and family ==
Hatoyama was born Yasuko Ishibashi (石橋 安子, Ishibashi Yasuko) in present-day Kurume, Fukuoka. Her father, Shojiro Ishibashi, founded the Bridgestone Corporation, the world's largest tiremaker, in 1930. She became heiress to Ishibashi's considerable inheritance upon his death in the 1970s. She attended middle and high school in Tokyo, during which time she met former Iichirō Hatoyama, who later became Foreign Minister. They were married at the Imperial Hotel, Tokyo in 1942.

The couple had two sons, both of whom have pursued successful political careers. Kunio Hatoyama served as the Minister of Internal Affairs and Communications under Prime Minister Taro Aso. Yukio Hatoyama defeated Aso in the 2009 general election and became the Prime Minister.

The Hatoyama family has been called "Japan's Kennedy family".

== Political activities ==
Hatoyama contributed significant amounts of her inheritance to help finance the political and career goals of both her sons. She donated billions of yen in 1996 when her two sons, Kunio and Yukio, co-founded the Democratic Party of Japan (DPJ). Her contributions helped to fund and establish the new political party. She was nicknamed the "Godmother" within the Japanese political world for her financial contributions to the political ambitions of her family.

== Death ==
Hatoyama resided in a home for the elderly adjacent to St. Luke's International Hospital in Chuo, Tokyo. She died there on February 11, 2013, at the age of 90. Hatoyama was survived by her two sons, four grandchildren and five great-grandchildren at the time of her death.
