= Government of Japan =

Government of Japan 日本国政府
- Japanese government's logo is used for English-language speakers
- Polity type: Unitary parliamentary constitutional monarchy
- Constitution: Constitution of Japan
- Formation: 1867; 159 years ago

Legislative branch
- Name: National Diet
- Meeting place: National Diet Building
- Upper house
- Name: Senate
- Presiding officer: Masakazu Sekiguchi, President of the Senate
- Lower house
- Name: House of Representatives
- Presiding officer: Eisuke Mori, Speaker of the House of Representatives

Executive branch
- Head of state
- Title: Emperor
- Currently: Naruhito
- Head of government
- Title: Prime Minister
- Currently: Sanae Takaichi
- Appointer: Emperor
- Cabinet
- Name: Cabinet of Japan
- Current cabinet: Takaichi Cabinet
- Leader: Prime Minister
- Appointer: Prime Minister
- Headquarters: Naikaku Sōri Daijin Kantei (Prime Minister's Office of Japan)

Judicial branch
- Supreme Court of Japan
- Seat: Chiyoda, Tokyo

Government of Japan

Japanese name
- Kanji: 日本国政府
- Hiragana: にほんこくせいふ (formal) にっぽんこくせいふ (informal)
Transcriptions
- Romanization: Nihonkoku Seifu (formal); Nipponkoku Seifu (informal)

The central government of Japan consists of legislative, executive and judiciary branches and functions under the framework established by the Constitution of Japan. Japan is a unitary state, containing forty-seven administrative divisions, with the emperor as its head of state. His role is ceremonial and he has no powers related to the Government. Instead, it is the Cabinet, comprising the prime minister and the ministers of state, that directs and controls the government and the civil service. The Cabinet has the executive power and is formed by the prime minister, who is the head of government. The Prime Minister is nominated by the National Diet and appointed to office by the Emperor. The current cabinet is the Takaichi Cabinet, which is led by prime minister Sanae Takaichi, who assumed office on October 21, 2025. The country has had a Liberal Democratic supermajority government since 2026.

The National Diet is the legislature, the organ of the Legislative branch. The Diet is bicameral, consisting of two houses with the Senate being the upper house, and the House of Representatives being the lower house. The members of both houses of the Diet are directly elected by the people, who are the source of sovereignty. The Diet is defined as the supreme organ of sovereignty in the Constitution. The Supreme Court and other lower courts make up the Judicial branch and have all the judicial powers in the state. The Supreme Court has ultimate judicial authority to interpret the constitution and the power of judicial review. The judicial branch is independent from the executive and the legislative branches. Judges are nominated or appointed by the Cabinet and never removed by the executive or the legislature except during impeachment.

The Government of Japan is based in the capital of Tokyo, where the National Diet Building, the Imperial Palace, the Supreme Court, the Prime Minister's Office and the ministries are all located.

== History ==
Before the Meiji Restoration, Japan was ruled by the government of successive military shōgun. During this period, effective power of the government resided in the Shōgun, who officially ruled the country in the name of the Emperor. The Shōgun were the hereditary military governors, with their modern rank equivalent to a generalissimo. Although the Emperor was the sovereign who appointed the Shōgun, his roles were ceremonial and he took no part in governing the country. This is often compared to the present role of the Emperor, whose official role is to appoint the Prime Minister.

The return of political power to the Emperor (to the Imperial Court) at the end of 1867 meant the resignation of Shōgun Tokugawa Yoshinobu, agreeing to "be the instrument for carrying out" the Emperor's orders. This event restored the country to Imperial rule and the proclamation of the Empire of Japan. In 1889, the Meiji Constitution was adopted in a move to strengthen Japan to the level of western nations, resulting in the first parliamentary system in Asia. It provided a form of mixed constitutional-absolute monarchy (a semi-constitutional monarchy), with an independent judiciary, based on the Prussian model of the time.

A new aristocracy known as the kazoku was established. It merged the ancient court nobility of the Heian period, the kuge, and the former daimyō, feudal lords subordinate to the shōgun. It also established the Imperial Diet, consisting of the House of Representatives and the House of Peers. Members of the House of Peers were made up of the Imperial Family, the Kazoku, and those nominated by the Emperor, while members of the House of Representatives were elected by direct male suffrage. Despite clear distinctions between powers of the executive branch and the Emperor in the Meiji Constitution, ambiguity and contradictions in the Constitution eventually led to a political crisis. It also devalued the notion of civilian control over the military, which meant that the military could develop and exercise a great influence on politics.

Following the end of World War II, the present Constitution of Japan was adopted. It replaced the previous Imperial rule with a form of Western-style liberal democracy.

As of 2020, the Japan Research Institute found the national government is mostly analog, because only 7.5% (4,000 of the 55,000) administrative procedures can be completed entirely online. The rate is 7.8% at the Ministry of Economy, Trade and Industry, 8% at the Ministry of Internal Affairs and Communications, and only 1.3% at the Ministry of Agriculture, Forestry and Fisheries.

On February 12, 2021, Tetsushi Sakamoto was appointed as the Minister of Loneliness to alleviate social isolation and loneliness across different age groups and genders.

== The Emperor ==
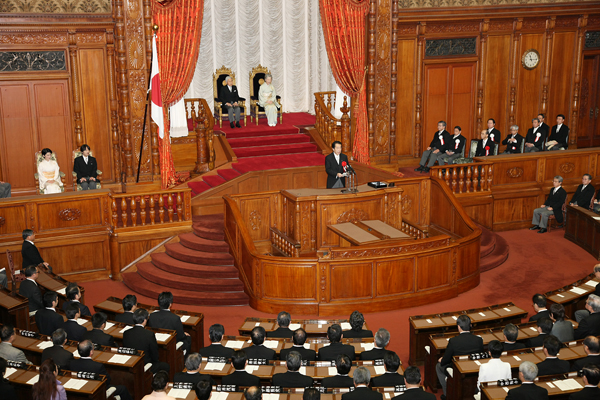
Emperor Akihito and Empress Michiko seated in the Chamber of the Senate of the National Diet, with members of the imperial family, the cabinet, and prime minister Naoto Kan giving the government's speech in front of the assembled members of parliament (2010)

The emperor of Japan is the head of the Imperial Family and the ceremonial head of state. He is defined by the Constitution to be "the symbol of the State and of the unity of the people". However, his role is entirely ceremonial and representative in nature. As explicitly stated in article 4 of the Constitution, he has no powers related to government.

Article 6 of the Constitution of Japan delegates the Emperor the following ceremonial roles:

1. Appointment of the prime minister as designated by the Diet.
2. Appointment of the chief justice of the Supreme Court as designated by the Cabinet.

While the Cabinet is the source of executive power and most of its power is exercised directly by the prime minister, several of its powers are exercised through the Emperor. The powers exercised via the Emperor, as stipulated by Article 7 of the Constitution, are:

1. Promulgation of amendments of the constitution, laws, cabinet orders and treaties.
2. Dissolution of the House of Representatives.
3. Proclamation of general election of members of the Diet.
4. Attestation of the appointment and dismissal of Ministers of State and other officials as provided for by law, and of full powers and credentials of Ambassadors and Ministers.
5. Attestation of general and special amnesty, commutation of punishment, reprieve, and restoration of rights.
6. Awarding of honors.
7. Attestation of instruments of ratification and other diplomatic documents as provided for by law.
8. Receiving foreign ambassadors and ministers.
9. Performance of ceremonial functions.

These powers are exercised in accordance with the binding advice of the Cabinet.

The emperor is known to hold the nominal ceremonial authority. For example, he is the only person that has the authority to appoint the prime minister, even though the Diet has the power to designate the person fitted for the position. One such example can be prominently seen in the 2009 Dissolution of the House of Representatives. The House was expected to be dissolved on the advice of the prime minister, but was temporarily unable to do so for the next general election, as both the Emperor and Empress were visiting Canada.

In this manner, the emperor's modern role is often compared to those of the Shogunate period and much of Japan's history, whereby the emperor held great symbolic authority but had little political power; which is often held by others nominally appointed by the emperor himself. Today, a legacy has somewhat continued for a retired prime minister who still wields considerable power, to be called a Shadow Shogun.

Unlike his European counterparts, the emperor is not the source of sovereign power and the government does not act under his name. Instead, the emperor represents the state and appoints other high officials in the name of the state, in which the Japanese people hold sovereignty. Article 5 of the Constitution, in accordance with the Imperial Household Law, allows a regency to be established in the emperor's name, should the emperor be unable to perform his duties.

On November 20, 1989, the Supreme Court ruled it doesn't have judicial power over the emperor.

The Imperial House of Japan is said to be the oldest continuing hereditary monarchy in the world. According to the Kojiki and Nihon Shoki, Japan was founded by the Imperial House in 660 BC by Emperor Jimmu. Emperor Jimmu was the first Emperor of Japan and the ancestor of all of the Emperors that followed. He is, according to Japanese mythology, the direct descendant of Amaterasu, the sun goddess of the native Shinto religion, through Ninigi, his great-grandfather.

The current emperor of Japan is Naruhito. He was officially enthroned on May 1, 2019, following the abdication of his father. He is styled as His Imperial Majesty, and his reign bears the era name of Reiwa. Fumihito is the heir presumptive to the Chrysanthemum Throne.

== Executive ==
The 5–7 paulownia is used as the emblem of the Cabinet and prime minister

The executive branch of Japan is headed by the prime minister. The prime minister is the head of the Cabinet, and is designated by the legislative organ, the National Diet. The Cabinet consists of the ministers of state and may be appointed or dismissed by the prime minister at any time. Explicitly defined to be the source of executive power, it is in practice, however, mainly exercised by the prime minister. The practice of its powers is responsible to the Diet, and as a whole, should the Cabinet lose confidence and support to be in office by the Diet, the Diet may dismiss the Cabinet en masse with a motion of no confidence.

=== Prime minister ===
The prime minister of Japan (内閣総理大臣) is designated by the National Diet and serves a term of four years or less; with no limits imposed on the number of terms the Prime Minister may hold. The prime minister heads the Cabinet and exercises "control and supervision" of the executive branch, and is the head of government and commander-in-chief of the Japan Self-Defense Forces. The prime minister is vested with the power to present bills to the Diet, to sign laws, to declare a state of emergency, and may also dissolve the Diet's House of Representatives at will. The prime minister presides over the Cabinet and appoints, or dismisses, the other Cabinet ministers.

Both houses of the National Diet designates the prime minister with a ballot cast under the run-off system. Under the Constitution, should both houses not agree on a common candidate, then a joint committee is allowed to be established to agree on the matter; specifically within a period of ten days, exclusive of the period of recess. However, if both houses still do not agree to each other, the decision made by the House of Representatives is deemed to be that of the National Diet. Upon designation, the prime minister is presented with their letter of appointment, and then formally invested to office by the Emperor.

As a candidate designated by the Diet, the prime minister is required to report to the Diet whenever demanded. The prime minister must also be both a civilian and a member of either house of the Diet.

No.	Name (English)	Name (Japanese)	Gender	Took office	Left office	Term	Cabinets
1	Junichiro Koizumi	小泉 純一郎	Male	April 26, 2001	September 26, 2006	5 years, 153 days	87th: Koizumi I (R1) (R2); 88th: Koizumi II (R); 89th: Koizumi III (R)
2	Shinzo Abe	安倍 晋三	Male	September 26, 2006	September 26, 2007	1 year, 0 days	90th: S. Abe I (R)
3	Yasuo Fukuda	福田 康夫	Male	September 26, 2007	September 24, 2008	364 days	91st: Y. Fukuda (R)
4	Tarō Asō	麻生 太郎	Male	September 24, 2008	September 16, 2009	357 days	92nd: Asō
5	Yukio Hatoyama	鳩山 由紀夫	Male	September 16, 2009	June 8, 2010	265 days	93rd: Y. Hatoyama
6	Naoto Kan	菅 直人	Male	June 8, 2010	September 2, 2011	1 year, 86 days	94th: Kan (R1) (R2)
7	Yoshihiko Noda	野田 佳彦	Male	September 2, 2011	December 26, 2012	1 year, 115 days	95th: Noda (R1) (R2) (R3)
8	Shinzo Abe	安倍 晋三	Male	December 26, 2012	September 16, 2020	7 years, 265 days	96th: S. Abe II (R); 97th: S. Abe III (R1) (R2) (R3); 98th: S. Abe IV (R1) (R2)
9	Yoshihide Suga	菅 義偉	Male	September 16, 2020	October 4, 2021	1 year, 18 days	99th: Suga
10	Fumio Kishida	岸田 文雄	Male	October 4, 2021	October 1, 2024	2 years, 363 days	100th: Kishida I 101st: Kishida II
11	Shigeru Ishiba	石破 茂	Male	October 1, 2024	October 21, 2025	2 years, 42 days	102nd: Ishiba I 103rd: Ishiba II
12	Sanae Takaichi	高市 早苗	Female	October 21, 2025	Present	1 year, 22 days	104th: Takaichi I 105th: Takaichi II

=== The Cabinet ===
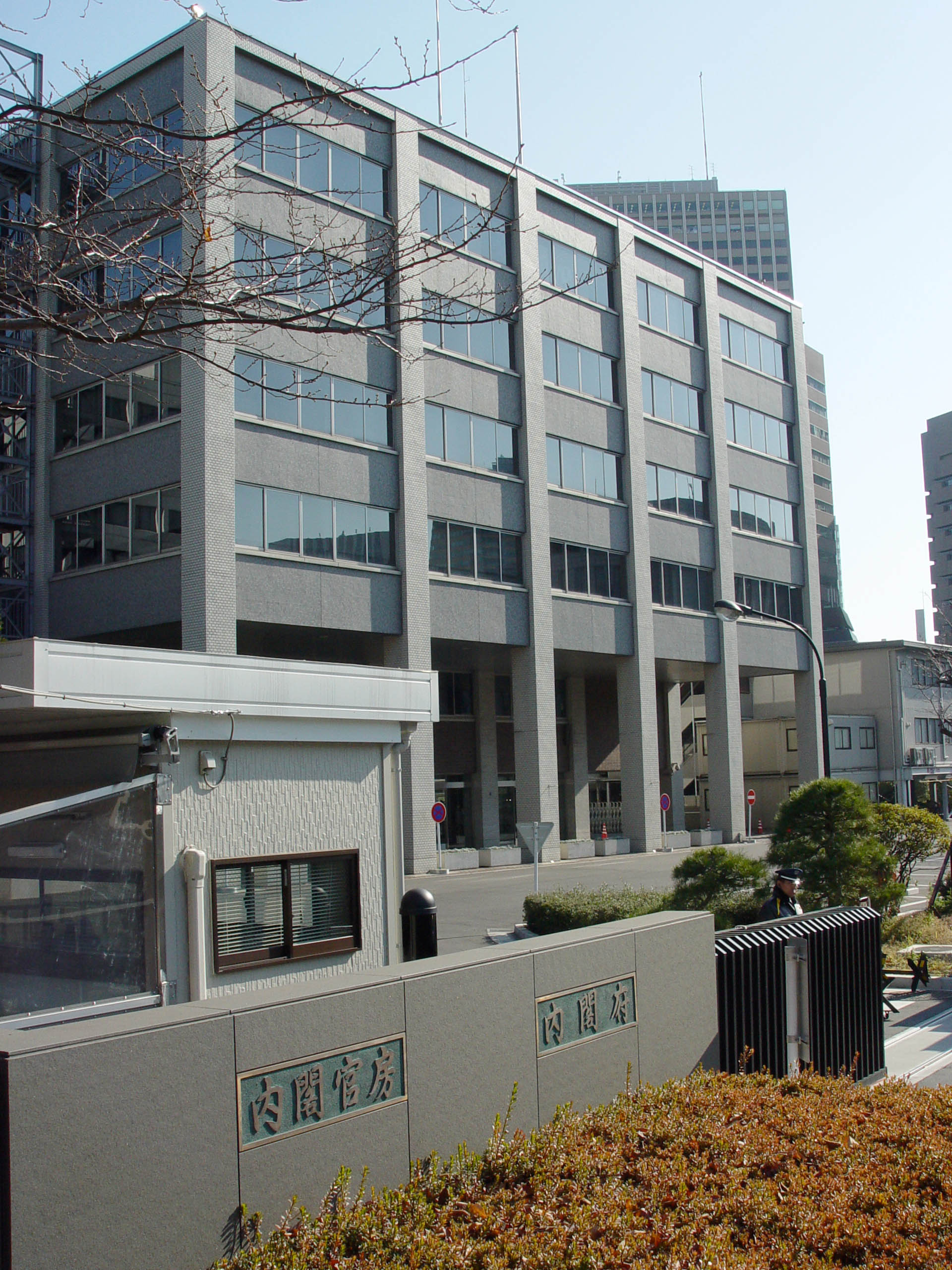
Cabinet Office Building

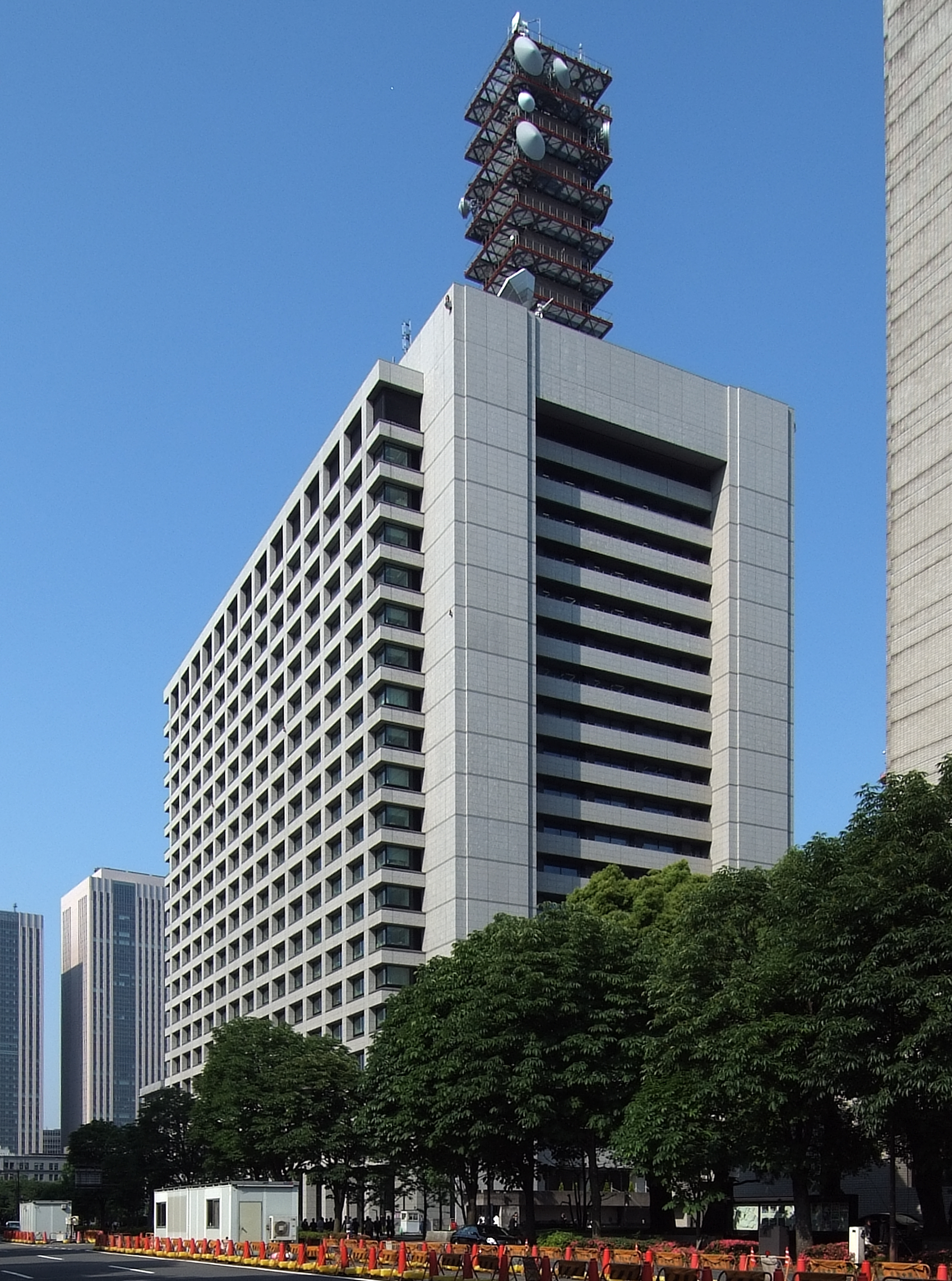
2nd Building of the Central Government

The Cabinet of Japan (内閣) consists of the Ministers of State and the Prime Minister. The members of the Cabinet are appointed by the Prime Minister, and under the Cabinet Law, the number of members of the Cabinet appointed, excluding the Prime Minister, must be fourteen or less, but may only be increased to nineteen should a special need arise. Article 68 of the Constitution states that all members of the Cabinet must be civilians and the majority of them must be chosen from among the members of either house of the National Diet. The precise wording leaves an opportunity for the Prime Minister to appoint some non-elected Diet officials. The Cabinet is required to resign en masse while still continuing its functions, till the appointment of a new Prime Minister, when the following situation arises:

1. The Diet's House of Representatives passes a non-confidence resolution, or rejects a confidence resolution, unless the House of Representatives is dissolved within the next ten days.
2. When there is a vacancy in the post of the Prime Minister, or upon the first convocation of the Diet after a general election of the members of the House of Representatives.

Conceptually deriving legitimacy from the Diet, whom it is responsible to, the Cabinet exercises its power in two different ways. In practice, much of its power is exercised by the Prime Minister, while others are exercised nominally by the Emperor.

Article 73 of the Constitution of Japan expects the Cabinet to perform the following functions, in addition to general administration:

1. Administer the law faithfully; conduct affairs of state.
2. Manage foreign affairs.
3. Conclude treaties. However, it shall obtain prior or, depending on circumstances, subsequent approval of the Diet.
4. Administer the civil service, in accordance with standards established by law.
5. Prepare the budget, and present it to the Diet.
6. Enact cabinet orders to execute the provisions of this Constitution and of the law. However, it cannot include penal provisions in such cabinet orders unless authorized by such law.
7. Decide on general amnesty, special amnesty, commutation of punishment, reprieve, and restoration of rights.

Under the Constitution, all laws and cabinet orders must be signed by the competent Minister and countersigned by the Prime Minister, before being formally promulgated by the Emperor. Also, all members of the Cabinet cannot be subject to legal action without the consent of the Prime Minister; however, without impairing the right to take legal action.

As of 21 October 2025, the makeup of the Cabinet is as follows:

Parties
Liberal Democratic

R	Member of the House of Representatives
C	Member of the House of Councillors

Portfolio	Portrait	Minister		Took office	Left office	Notes
Cabinet ministers
Prime Minister		Sanae Takaichi	R	21 October 2025	Incumbent	
Minister for Internal Affairs and Communications		Yoshimasa Hayashi	R	21 October 2025	Incumbent	
Minister of Justice		Hiroshi Hiraguchi	R	21 October 2025	Incumbent	
Minister for Foreign Affairs		Toshimitsu Motegi	R	21 October 2025	Incumbent	
Minister of Finance; Minister of State for Financial Services Minister in charge of Reviewing Special Measures Concerning Taxation and Subsidies		Satsuki Katayama	C	21 October 2025	Incumbent	
Minister of Education, Culture, Sports, Science and Technology		Yohei Matsumoto	R	21 October 2025	Incumbent	
Minister of Health, Labour and Welfare		Kenichiro Ueno	R	21 October 2025	Incumbent	
Minister of Agriculture, Forestry and Fisheries		Norikazu Suzuki	R	21 October 2025	Incumbent	
Minister of Economy, Trade and Industry Minister in charge of the Response to the Economic Impact Caused by the Nuclear Accident; Minister in charge of Green Transformation; Minister in charge of Industrial Competitiveness; Minister of State for the Nuclear Damage Compensation and Decommissioning Facilitation Corporation		Ryosei Akazawa	R	21 October 2025	Incumbent	
Minister of Land, Infrastructure, Transport and Tourism Minister in charge of Water Cycle Policy; Minister in charge of the World Horticultural Exhibition Yokohama 2027		Yasushi Kaneko	R	21 October 2025	Incumbent	
Minister of the Environment Minister of State for Nuclear Emergency Preparedness		Hirotaka Ishihara	R	21 October 2025	Incumbent	
Minister of Defense		Shinjirō Koizumi	R	21 October 2025	Incumbent	
Chief Cabinet Secretary; Minister in charge of Mitigating the Impact of U.S. Forces in Okinawa; Minister in charge of the Abduction Issue		Minoru Kihara	R	21 October 2025	Incumbent	
Minister for Digital Transformation Minister in charge of Digital Administrative and Fiscal Reform; Minister in charge of Administrative Reform; Minister in charge of the National Civil Service System; Minister in charge of Cybersecurity; Minister in State for Cybersecurity		Hisashi Matsumoto	R	21 October 2025	Incumbent	
Minister of Reconstruction Minister in charge of Comprehensive Policy Coordination for Revival from the Nuclear Accident at Fukushima; Minister in charge of the Preparation of Establishing the Disaster Management Agency; Minister in charge of Building National Resilience		Takao Makino	C	21 October 2025	Incumbent	
Chairman of the National Public Safety Commission Minister in charge of Territorial Issues; Minister of State for Disaster Management; Minister of State for Ocean Policy		Jiro Akama	R	21 October 2025	Incumbent	
Minister of State for Okinawa and Northern Territories Affairs; Minister of State for Consumer Affairs and Food Safety; Minister of State for Policies Related to Children, Declining Birthrate, Youth Empowerment, and Gender Equality; Minister of State for Regional Revitalization; Minister of State for Ainu-Related Policies; Minister of State for Promoting Cohesive and Mutual Assistance Society; Minister in charge of Women's Empowerment; Minister in charge of Cohesive Society; Minister in charge of Strategy for the Future of Regions		Hitoshi Kikawada	R	21 October 2025	Incumbent	
Minister in charge of Japan's Growth Strategy Minister in charge of Developing an Environment for Wage Increases; Minister in charge of Startups; Minister in charge of Social Security Reform; Minister in charge of Infectious Disease Crisis Management; Minister of State for Economic and Fiscal Policy; Minister of State for Regulatory Reform		Minoru Kiuchi	R	21 October 2025	Incumbent	
Minister in charge of Economic Security; Minister in charge of a Society of Well-Ordered and Harmonious Coexistence with Foreign Nationals; Minister of State for "Cool Japan" Strategy; Minister of State for Intellectual Property Strategy; Minister of State for Science and Technology Policy; Minister of State for Space Policy; Minister of State for AI Strategy; Minister of State for Economic Security		Kimi Onoda	C	21 October 2025	Incumbent	

=== Ministries and agencies ===
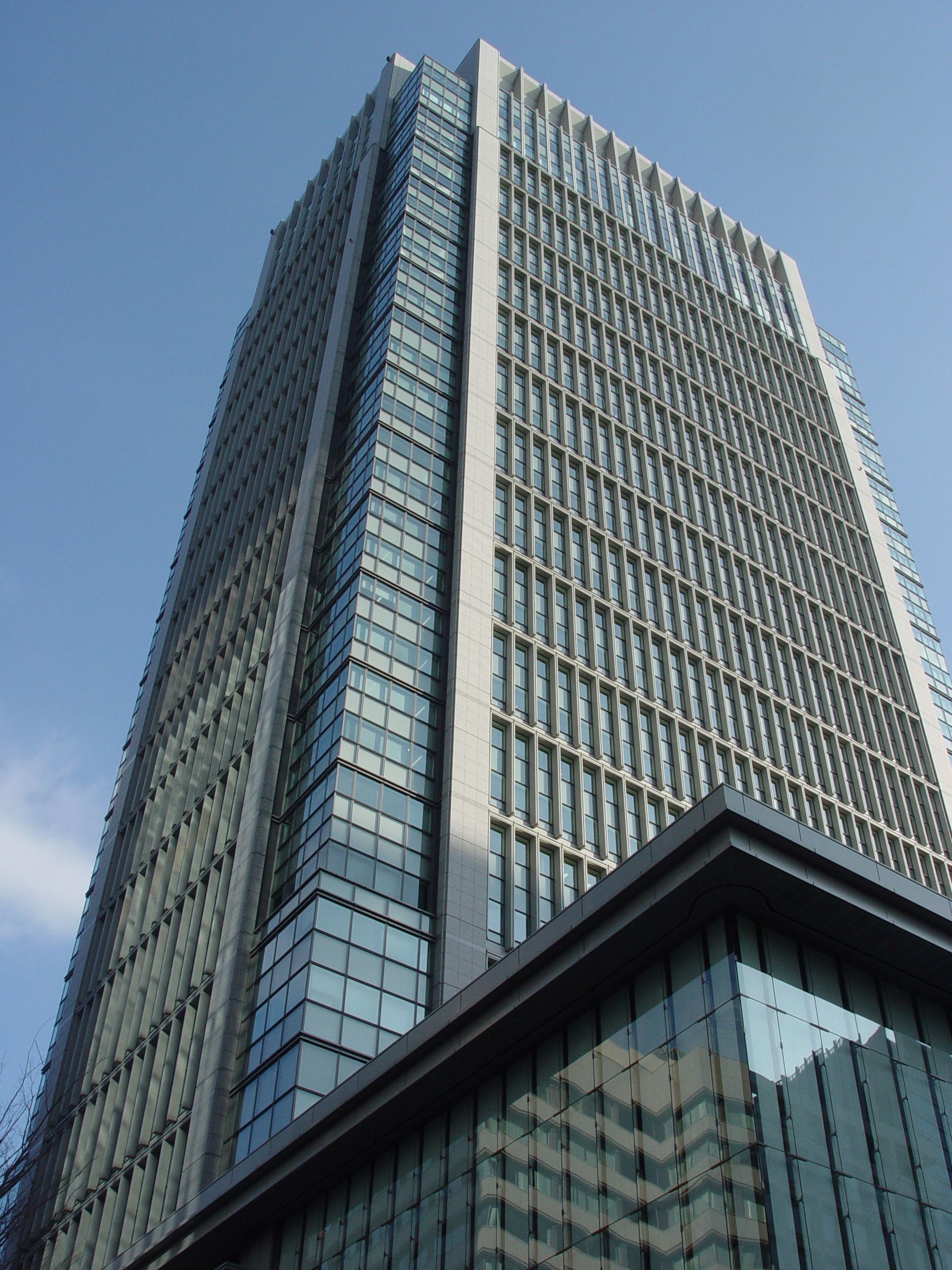
Agency for Cultural Affairs Office Building

Politics of the Constitution of Japan

The ministries of Japan (中央省庁, Chuo shōcho) consist of eleven executive ministries and the Cabinet Office. Each ministry is headed by a Minister of State, which are mainly senior legislators, and are appointed from among the members of the Cabinet by the Prime Minister. The Cabinet Office, formally headed by the Prime Minister, is an agency that handles the day-to-day affairs of the Cabinet. The ministries are the most influential part of the daily-exercised executive power, and since few ministers serve for more than a year or so necessary to grab hold of the organisation, most of its power lies within the senior bureaucrats.

Below is a series of ministry-affiliated government agencies and bureaus responsible for government procedures and activities as of August 23, 2022.

- Cabinet Office
  - National Public Safety Commission
  - National Police Agency
  - Consumer Affairs Agency
  - Financial Services Agency
  - Fair Trade Commission
  - Food Safety Commission
  - Personal Information Protection Commission
  - Imperial Household Agency
  - Gender Equality Bureau
  - Council on Economic and Fiscal Policy
  - Atomic Energy Commission
  - International Peace Cooperation
  - Council for Science, Technology and Innovation
  - Headquarters for Ocean Policy
  - Northern Territories Affairs Administration
  - Public Relations Office of the Government of Japan
- Cabinet Secretariat
  - National Information Security Centre
  - National Personnel Authority
  - Coordination Office of Measures on Emerging Infectious Diseases
  - Headquarters for the Abduction Issue
  - Cabinet Legislation Bureau
  - Office of Policy Planning and Coordination on Territory and Sovereignty
- Reconstruction Agency
- Ministry of Internal Affairs and Communications
  - Environmental Dispute Coordination Commission
  - Fire and Disaster Management Agency
- Ministry of Justice
  - Public Security Examination Commission
  - Public Security Intelligence Agency
  - Public Prosecutors Office
  - Immigration Services Agency
- Ministry of Foreign Affairs
- Ministry of Finance
  - National Tax Agency
  - Japan Customs
- Ministry of Defense
  - Acquisition, Technology and Logistics Agency
  - Japan Self-Defence Forces (Ground / Maritime / Air)
  - Joint Staff
- Ministry of Education, Culture, Sports, Science and Technology (MEXT)
  - Education Policy Bureau
  - Elementary and Secondary Education Bureau
  - Higher Education Bureau
  - Science and Technology Policy Bureau
  - Research Promotion Bureau
  - Agency for Cultural Affairs
  - Japan Sports Agency
  - The Japan Art Academy
  - National Institute for Educational Policy Research
  - National Institute of Science and Technology Policy
  - The Japan Academy
  - Headquarters for Earthquake Research Promotion
  - Japanese National Commission for UNESCO
- Ministry of Health, Labour, and Welfare
  - Pension Service
  - Central Labour Relations Commission
- Ministry of Agriculture, Forestry and Fisheries
  - Fisheries agency
  - Forestry Agency
- Ministry of Economy, Trade and Industry (METI)
  - Agency for Natural Resources and Energy
  - Small and Medium Enterprise Agency
  - Japan Patent Office
- Ministry of Land, Infrastructure, Transport and Tourism (MLIT)
  - Japan Transport Safety Board
  - Japan Tourism Agency
  - Japan Meteorological Agency
  - Japan Coast Guard
- Ministry of the Environment
  - Nuclear Regulation Authority
- Board of Audit

== Legislative ==
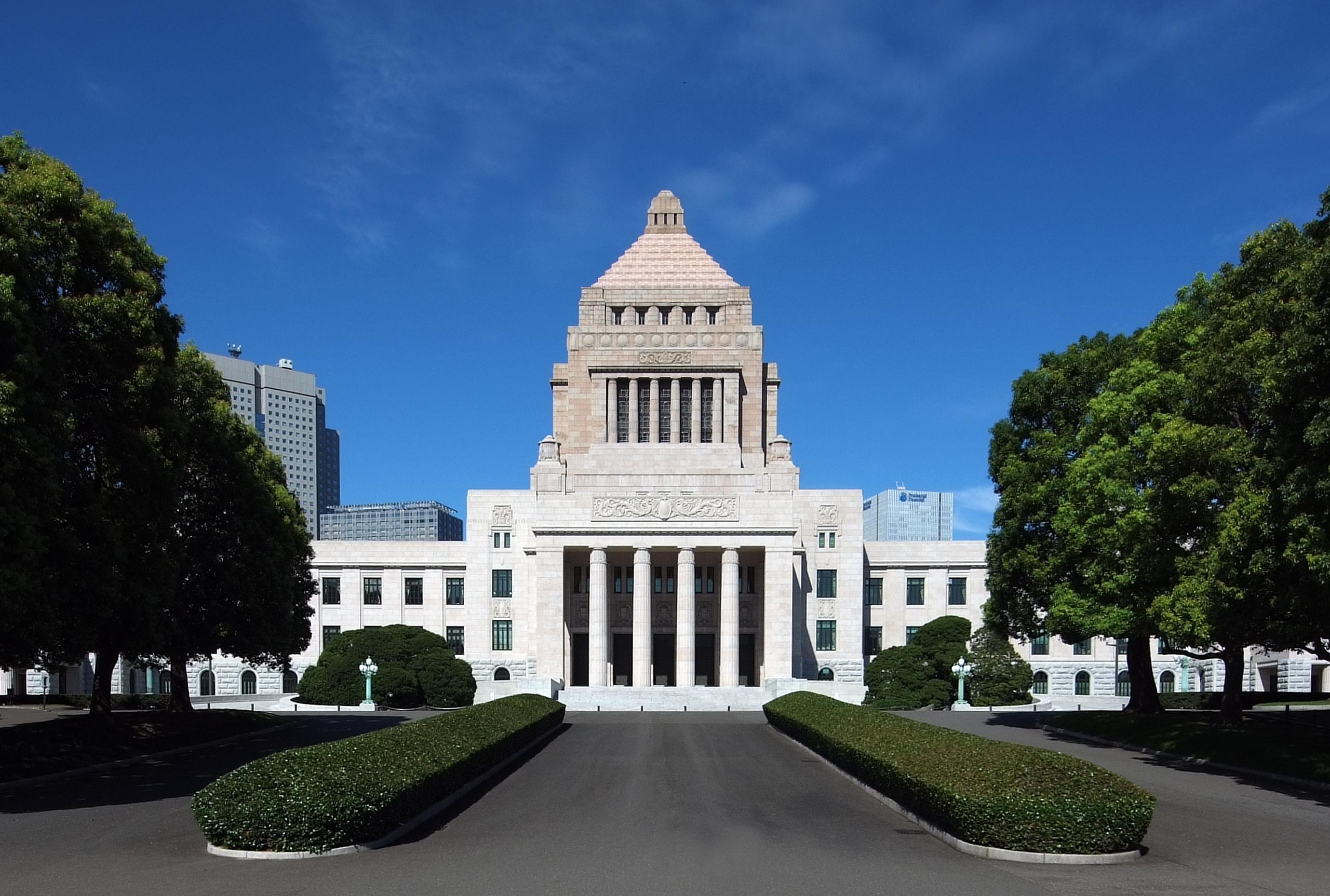
National Diet Building, Nagatachō, Chiyoda-ku, Tokyo

The legislative branch organ of Japan is the National Diet (国会). It is a bicameral legislature, composing of a lower house, the House of Representatives, and an upper house, the Senate (formerly named the 'House of Councillors'). Empowered by the Constitution to be "the highest organ of State power" and the only "sole law-making organ of the State", its houses are both directly elected under a parallel voting system and is ensured by the Constitution to have no discrimination on the qualifications of each members; whether be it based on "race, creed, sex, social status, family origin, education, property or income". The National Diet, therefore, reflects the sovereignty of the people; a principle of popular sovereignty whereby the supreme power lies within, in this case, the Japanese people.

The Diet responsibilities includes the making of laws, the approval of the annual national budget, the approval of the conclusion of treaties and the selection of the prime minister. In addition, it has the power to initiate draft constitutional amendments, which, if approved, are to be presented to the people for ratification in a referendum before being promulgated by the Emperor, in the name of the people. The Constitution also enables both houses to conduct investigations in relation to government, demand the presence and testimony of witnesses, and the production of records, as well as allowing either house of the Diet to demand the presence of the Prime Minister or the other Minister of State, to give answers or explanations whenever so required. The Diet is also able to impeach Court judges convicted of criminal or irregular conduct. The Constitution, however, does not specify the voting methods, the number of members of each house, and all other matters pertaining to the method of election of the each members, and are thus, allowed to be determined for by law.

Under the provisions of the Constitution and by law, all adults aged over 18 are eligible to vote, with a secret ballot and a universal suffrage, and those elected have certain protections from apprehension while the Diet is in session. Speeches, debates, and votes cast in the Diet also enjoy parliamentary privileges. Each house is responsible for disciplining its own members, and all deliberations are public unless two-thirds or more of those members present passes a resolution agreeing it otherwise. The Diet also requires the presence of at least one-third of the membership of either house to constitute a quorum. All decisions are decided by a majority of those present, unless otherwise stated by the Constitution, and in the case of a tie, the presiding officer has the right to decide the issue. A member cannot be expelled, however, unless a majority of two-thirds or more of those members present passes a resolution.

Under the Constitution, at least one session of the Diet must be convened each year. The Cabinet can also, at will, convoke extraordinary sessions of the Diet and is required to, when a quarter or more of the total members of either house demands it. During an election, only the House of Representatives is dissolved. The Senate is however, not dissolved but only closed, and may, in times of national emergency, be convoked for an emergency session. The Emperor both convokes the Diet and dissolves the House of Representatives, but only does so on the advice of the Cabinet.

For bills to become law, they are to be first passed by both houses of the National Diet, signed by the Ministers of State, countersigned by the prime minister, and then finally promulgated by the Emperor; however, without specifically giving the Emperor the power to oppose legislation.

=== House of Representatives ===
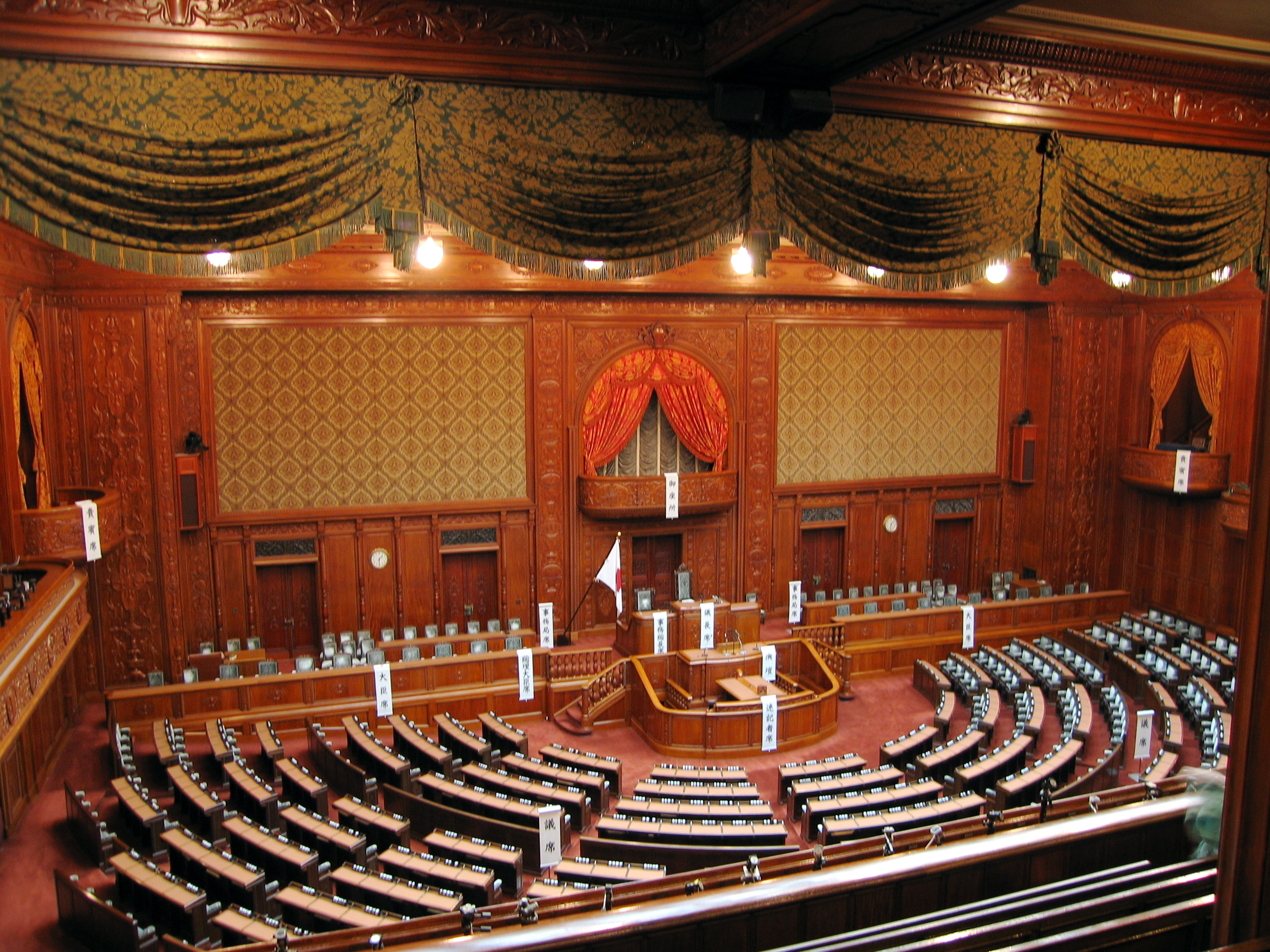
Chamber of the House of Representatives

The House of Representatives of Japan (衆議院) is the lower house, with the members of the house being elected once every four years, or when dissolved, for a four-year term. As of November 18, 2017, it has 465 members. Of these, 176 members are elected from 11 multi-member constituencies by a party-list system of proportional representation, and 289 are elected from single-member constituencies. 233 seats are required for majority. The House of Representatives is the more powerful house out of the two, it is able to override vetoes on bills imposed by the Senate with a two-thirds majority. It can, however, be dissolved by the prime minister at will. Members of the house must be of Japanese nationality; those aged 18 years and older may vote, while those aged 25 years and older may run for office in the lower house.

The legislative powers of the House of Representatives is considered to be more powerful than that of the Senate. While the Senate has the ability to veto most decisions made by the House of Representatives, some however, can only be delayed. This includes the legislation of treaties, the budget, and the selection of the prime minister. The Prime Minister, and collectively their Cabinet, can in turn, however, dissolve the House of Representatives whenever intended. While the House of Representatives is considered to be officially dissolved upon the preparation of the document, the House is only formally dissolved by the dissolution ceremony. The dissolution ceremony of the House is as follows:

1. The document is rubber stamped by the Emperor, and wrapped in a purple silk cloth; an indication of a document of state act, done on behalf of the people.
2. The document is passed on to the Chief Cabinet Secretary at the House of Representatives President's reception room.
3. The document is taken to the Chamber for preparation by the General-Secretary.
4. The General-Secretary prepares the document for reading by the Speaker.
5. The Speaker of the House of Representatives promptly declares the dissolution of the House.
6. The House of Representatives is formally dissolved.

It is customary that, upon the dissolution of the House, members will shout the Three Cheers of Banzai (萬歲).

=== Senate ===
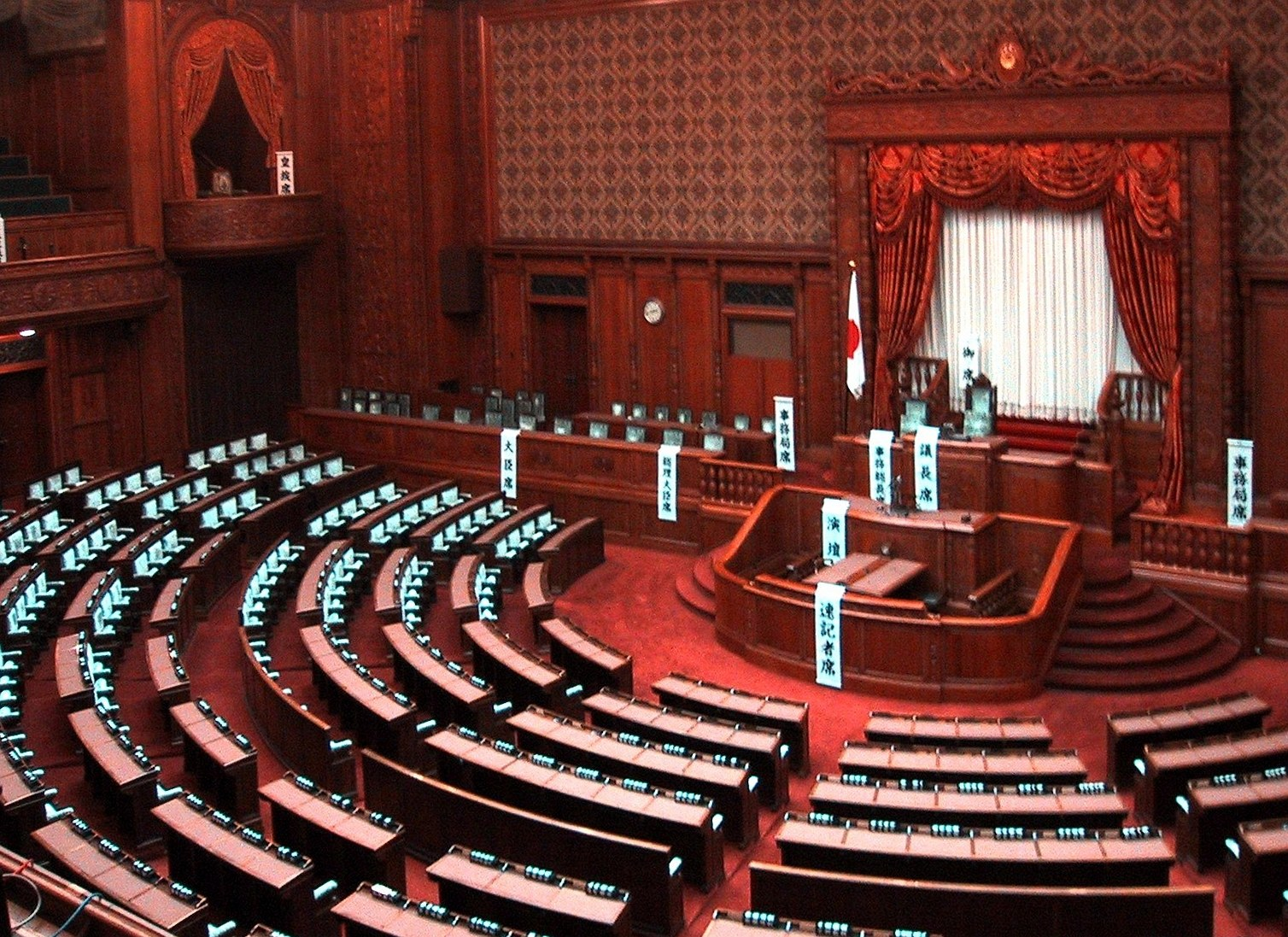
Chamber of the Senate

The Senate of Japan (参議院, formerly called the 'House of Councillors') is the upper house, with half the members of the house being elected once every three years, for a six-year term. As of November 18, 2017, it has 242 members. Of these, 73 are elected from the 47 prefectural districts, by single non-transferable votes, and 48 are elected from a nationwide list by proportional representation with open lists. The Senate cannot be dissolved by the prime minister. Members of the house must be of Japanese nationality; those aged 18 years and older may vote, while those aged 30 years and older may run for office in the upper house.

As the Senate can veto a decision made by the House of Representatives, the Senate can cause the House of Representatives to reconsider its decision. The House of Representatives however, can still insist on its decision by overriding the veto by the Senate with a two-thirds majority of its members present. Each year, and when required, the National Diet is convoked at the Senate, on the advice of the Cabinet, for an extra or an ordinary session, by the Emperor. A short speech is, however, usually first made by the Speaker of the House of Representatives before the Emperor proceeds to convoke the Diet with his Speech from the throne.

== Judicial ==
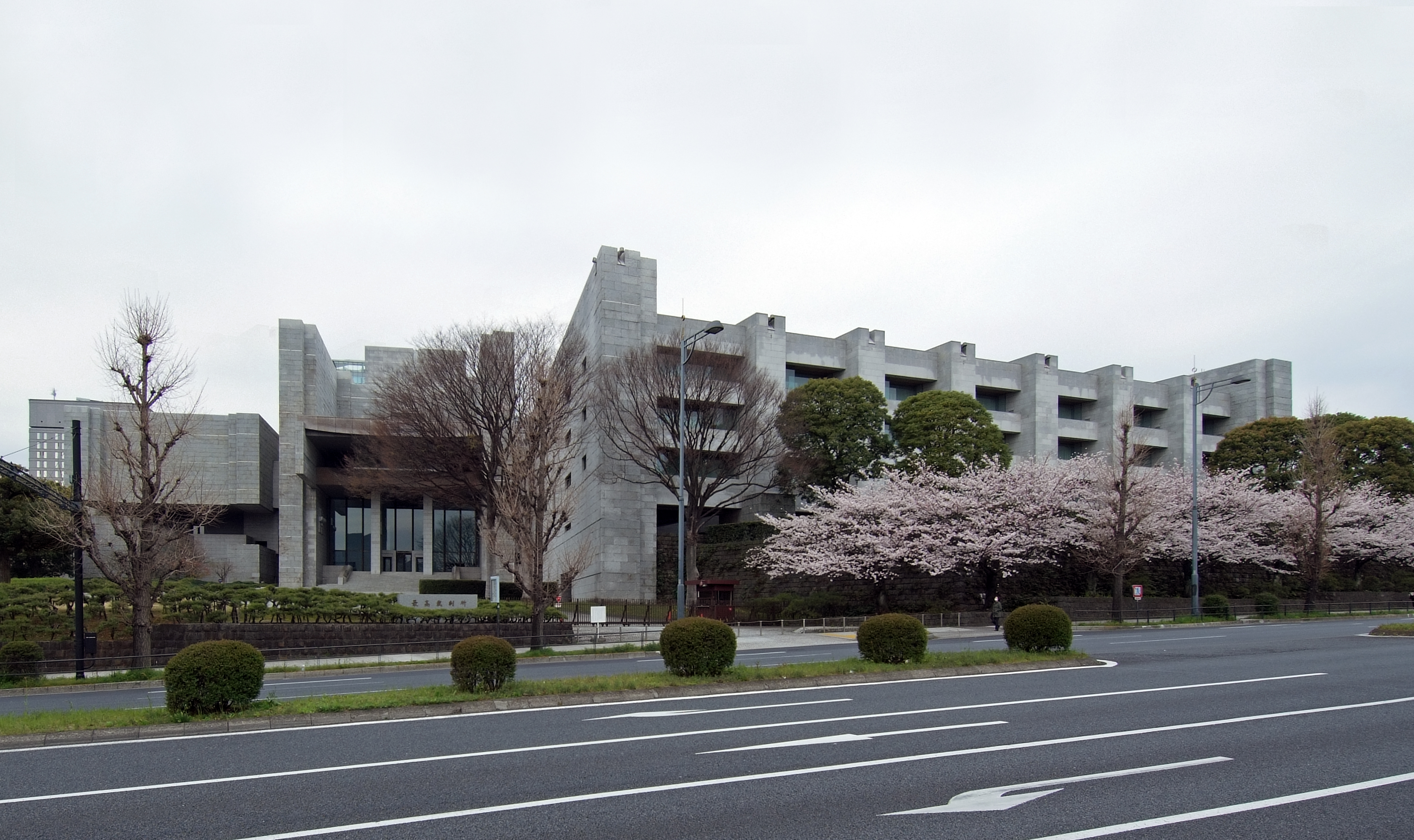
Supreme Court Building, Chiyoda-ku, Tokyo

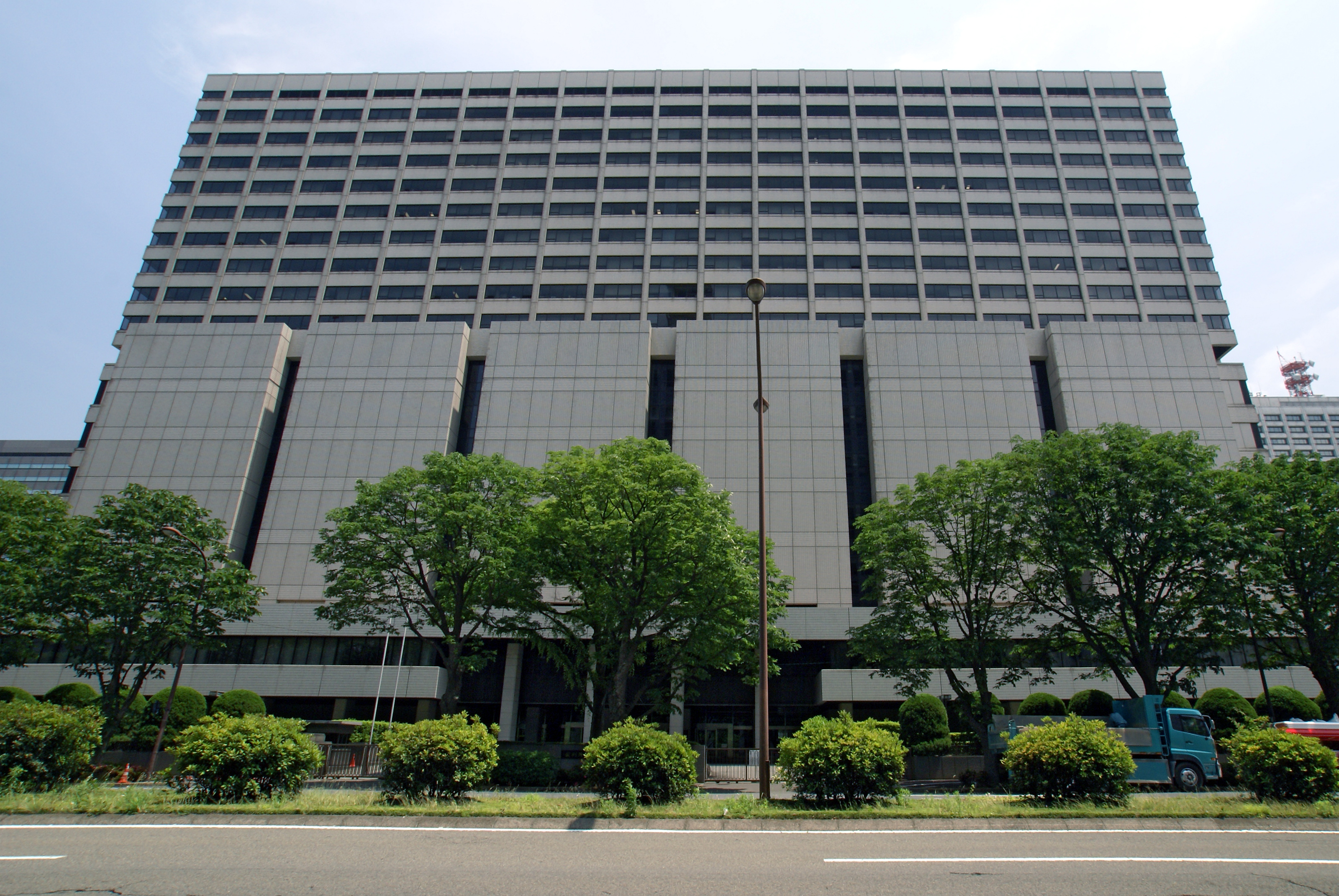
Tokyo High Court Building

The judicial branch of Japan consists of the Supreme Court, and four other lower courts; the High Courts, District Courts, Family Courts and Summary Courts. Divided into four basic tiers, the Court's independence from the executive and legislative branches are guaranteed by the Constitution, and is stated as: "no extraordinary tribunal shall be established, nor shall any organ or agency of the Executive be given final judicial power"; a feature known as the Separation of Powers. Article 76 of the Constitution states that all the Court judges are independent in the exercise of their own conscience and that they are only bounded by the Constitution and the laws. Court judges are removable only by public impeachment, and can only be removed, without impeachment, when they are judicially declared mentally or physically incompetent to perform their duties. The Constitution also explicitly denies any power for executive organs or agencies to administer disciplinary actions against judges. However, a Supreme Court judge may be dismissed by a majority in a referendum; of which, must occur during the first general election of the National Diet's House of Representatives following the judge's appointment, and also the first general election for every ten years lapse thereafter. Trials must be conducted, with judgment declared, publicly, unless the Court "unanimously determines publicity to be dangerous to public order or morals"; with the exception for trials of political offenses, offenses involving the press, and cases wherein the rights of people as guaranteed by the Constitution, which cannot be deemed and conducted privately. Court judges are appointed by the Cabinet, in attestation of the Emperor, while the Chief Justice is appointed by the Emperor, after being nominated by the Cabinet; which in practice, known to be under the recommendation of the former Chief Justice.

The Legal system in Japan has been historically influenced by Chinese law; developing independently during the Edo period through texts such as Kujikata Osadamegaki. It has, however, changed during the Meiji Restoration, and is now largely based on the European civil law; notably, the civil code based on the German model still remains in effect. A quasi-jury system has recently came into use, and the legal system also includes a bill of rights since May 3, 1947. The collection of Six Codes makes up the main body of the Japanese statutory law.

All Statutory Laws in Japan are required to be rubber stamped by the Emperor with the Privy Seal of Japan (天皇御璽), and no Law can take effect without the Cabinet's signature, the prime minister's countersignature and the Emperor's promulgation.

=== Supreme Court ===
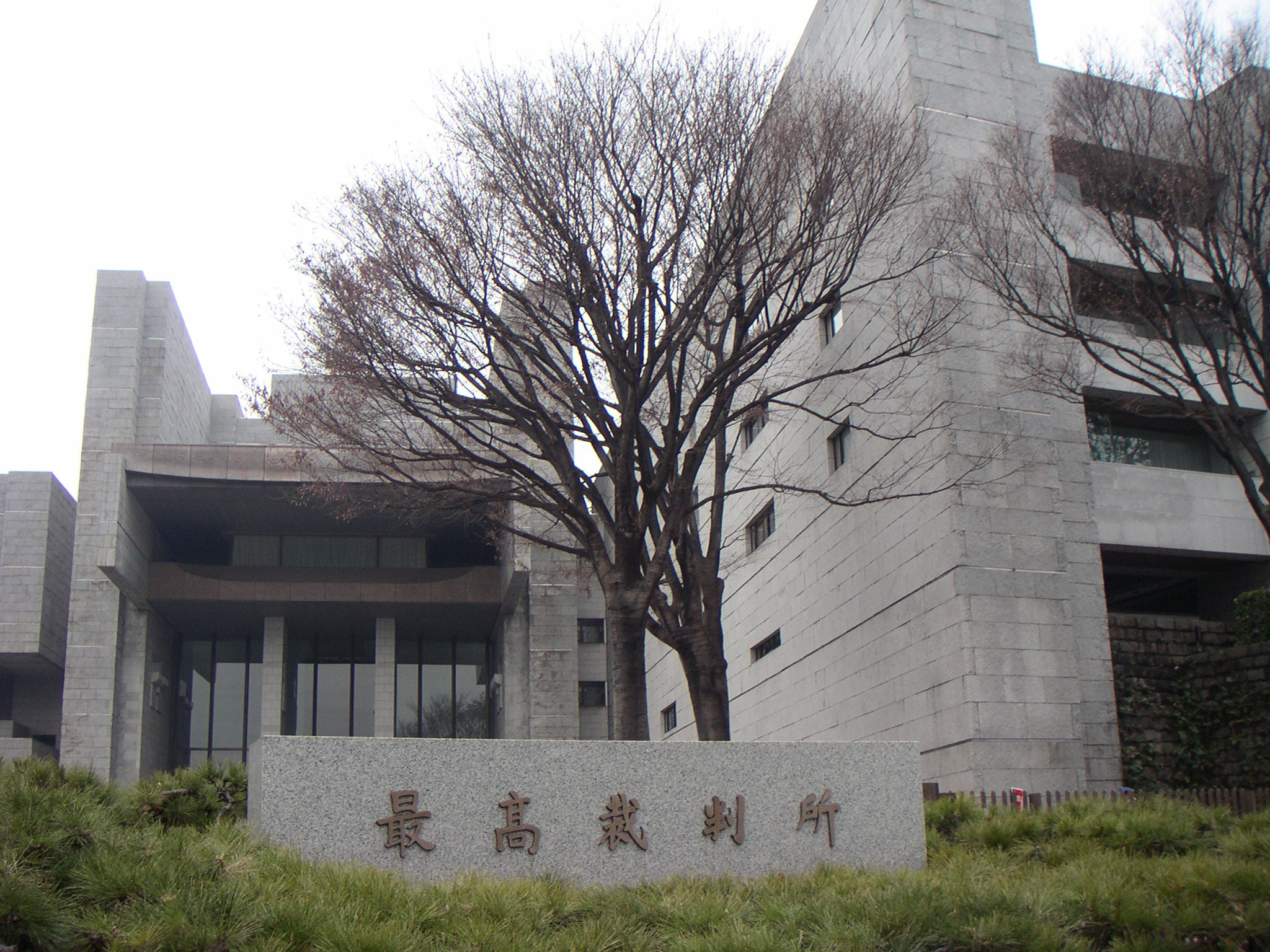
Building of the Supreme Court of Japan

The Supreme Court of Japan (最高裁判所) is the court of last resort and has the power of Judicial review; as defined by the Constitution to be "the court of last resort with power to determine the constitutionality of any law, order, regulation or official act". The Supreme Court is also responsible for nominating judges to lower courts and determining judicial procedures. It also oversees the judicial system, overseeing activities of public prosecutors, and disciplining judges and other judicial personnel.

=== High Courts ===
The High Courts of Japan (高等裁判所) has the jurisdiction to hear appeals to judgments rendered by District Courts and Family Courts, excluding cases under the jurisdiction of the Supreme Court. Criminal appeals are directly handled by the High Courts, but Civil cases are first handled by District Courts. There are eight High Courts in Japan: the Tokyo, Osaka, Nagoya, Hiroshima, Fukuoka, Sendai, Sapporo, and Takamatsu High Courts.

=== Penal system ===
The penal system of Japan (矯正施設) is operated by the Ministry of Justice. It is part of the criminal justice system, and is intended to resocialize, reform, and rehabilitate offenders. The ministry's Correctional Bureau administers the adult prison system, the juvenile correctional system, and three of the women's guidance homes, while the Rehabilitation Bureau operates the probation and the parole systems.

== Other government agencies ==
The Cabinet Public Affairs Office's Government Directory also listed a number of government agencies that are more independent from executive ministries. The list for these types of agencies can be seen below.

- Japan National Tourism Organisation (JNTO)
- Japan International Cooperation Agency (JICA)
- Japan External Trade Organisation (JETRO)
- The Japan Foundation
- Bank of Japan
- Japan Mint
- National Research Bureau of Brewing (NRIB)
- State guest houses (Akasaka Palace, Kyoto State Guest House)
- National Archives of Japan
- National Women's Education Centre
- Japan Broadcasting Corporation (NHK)
- National Institutes for Cultural Heritage
- Japan Arts Council
- Japan Society for the Promotion of Science (JSPS)
- Japan Aerospace Exploration Agency (JAXA)
- Japan Science and Technology Agency (JST)
- Japan Agency for Marine-Earth Science and Technology (JAMSTEC)
- National Institute for Materials Science (JIMS)
- Japan Atomic Energy Agency (JAEA)
- New Energy and Industrial Technology Development Organisation (NEDO)
- National Institute of Infectious Diseases (NIID)
- The Japan Institute for Labour Policy and Training

== Local government ==
Administrative divisions of Japan

According to Article 92 of the Constitution, the local governments of Japan (地方公共団体) are local public entities whose body and functions are defined by law in accordance with the principle of local autonomy. The main law that defines them is the Local Autonomy Law. They are given limited executive and legislative powers by the Constitution. Governors, mayors and members of assemblies are constitutionally elected by the residents.

The Ministry of Internal Affairs and Communications intervenes significantly in local government, as do other ministries. This is done chiefly financially because many local government jobs need funding initiated by national ministries. This is dubbed as the "thirty-percent autonomy".

The result of this power is a high level of organizational and policy standardization among the different local jurisdictions allowing them to preserve the uniqueness of their prefecture, city, or town. Some of the more collectivist jurisdictions, such as Tokyo and Kyoto, have experimented with policies in such areas as social welfare that later were adopted by the national government.

=== Local authorities ===
Japan is divided into forty-seven administrative divisions, the prefectures are: one metropolitan district (Tokyo), two urban prefectures (Kyoto and Osaka), forty-three rural prefectures, and one "district", Hokkaidō. Large cities are subdivided into wards, and further split into towns, or precincts, or subprefectures and counties.

Cities are self-governing units administered independently of the larger jurisdictions within which they are located. To attain city status, a jurisdiction must have at least 500,000 inhabitants, 60 percent of whom are engaged in urban occupations. There are self-governing towns outside the cities as well as precincts of urban wards. Like the cities, each has its own elected mayor and assembly. Villages are the smallest self-governing entities in rural areas. They often consist of a number of rural hamlets containing several thousand people connected to one another through the formally imposed framework of village administration. Villages have mayors and councils elected to four-year terms.

=== Structure ===
Each jurisdiction has a chief executive, called a governor (知事, chiji) in prefectures and a mayor (市町村長, shichōsonchō) in municipalities. Most jurisdictions also have a unicameral assembly (議会, gikai), although towns and villages may opt for direct governance by citizens in a general assembly (総会, sōkai). Both the executive and assembly are elected by popular vote every four years.

Local governments follow a modified version of the separation of powers used in the national government. An assembly may pass a vote of no confidence in the executive, in which case the executive must either dissolve the assembly within ten days or automatically lose their office. Following the next election, however, the executive remains in office unless the new assembly again passes a no confidence resolution.

The primary methods of local lawmaking are local ordinance (条例, jōrei) and local regulations (規則, kisoku). Ordinances, similar to statutes in the national system, are passed by the assembly and may impose limited criminal penalties for violations (up to 2 years in prison and/or 1 million yen in fines). Regulations, similar to cabinet orders in the national system, are passed by the executive unilaterally, are superseded by any conflicting ordinances, and may only impose a fine of up to 50,000 yen.

Local governments also generally have multiple committees such as school boards, public safety committees (responsible for overseeing the police), personnel committees, election committees and auditing committees. These may be directly elected or chosen by the assembly, executive or both.

Scholars have noted that political contestations at the local level tend not to be marked by strong party affiliation or political ideologies when compared to the national level. Moreover, in many local communities candidates from different parties tend to share similar concerns, e.g., regarding depopulation and how to attract new residents. Analyzing the political discourse among local politicians, Hijino suggests that local politics in depopulated areas is marked by two overarching ideas: "populationism" and "listenism." He writes, "“Populationism" assumes the necessity of maintaining and increasing the number of residents for the future and vitality of the municipality. "Listenism" assumes that no decision can be made unless all parties are consulted adequately, preventing majority decisions taken by elected officials over issues contested by residents. These two ideas, though not fully-fledged ideologies, are assumptions guiding the behavior of political actors in municipalities in Japan when dealing with depopulation."

All prefectures are required to maintain departments of general affairs, finance, welfare, health, and labor. Departments of agriculture, fisheries, forestry, commerce, and industry are optional, depending on local needs. The Governor is responsible for all activities supported through local taxation or the national government.

== See also ==
- Administrative structure of the Imperial Japanese Government
- Japanese honours system
- List of Japanese government and military commanders of World War II
- Politics of Japan
