= Asō cabinet =

Japanese government, 2008–2009

Asō Cabinet
- 92nd Cabinet of Japan
- 24 September 2008 – 16 September 2009
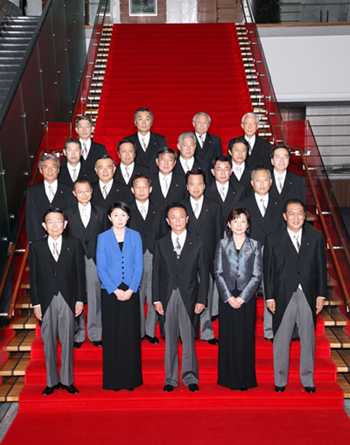
- Prime Minister Tarō Asō (front row, centre) with the newly-elected cabinet inside the Kantei, 24 September 2008
- Date formed: 24 September 2008
- Date dissolved: 16 September 2009

People and organisations
- Head of state: Emperor Akihito
- Head of government: Tarō Asō
- Head of government's history: Former Foreign Minister (2005-2007)
- Member party: Liberal Democratic–Komeito Coalition
- Status in legislature: HoR (Lower): LDP-K Coalition majority HoC (Upper): LDP-K Coalition minority
- Opposition party: Democratic Party
- Opposition leader: Ichirō Ozawa (until May 16, 2009); Yukio Hatoyama (from May 16, 2009)

History
- Outgoing election: 2009 Japanese general election
- Legislature term: 172th National Diet
- Predecessor: Yasuo Fukuda
- Successor: Yukio Hatoyama

The Asō Cabinet governed Japan from 24 September 2008 to 16 September 2009 by Prime Minister Tarō Asō after his predecessor Yasuo Fukuda resigned.

The cabinet resigned after a year in office following the defeat in the 2009 general election, which the opposition Democratic Party won a majority in the House of Representatives.

== History ==
=== Formation ===
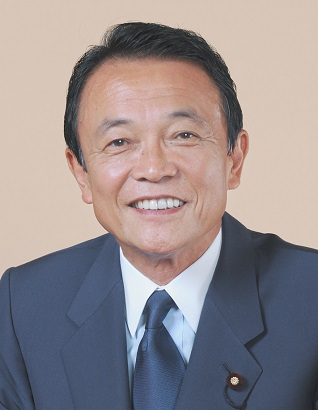
Prime Minister Tarō Asō

The 170th National Diet elected the new Prime Minister on 24 September 2008. As no single party controlled both the houses, the parliament failed to come up with a single candidate: the lower chamber House of Representatives nominated Tarō Asō, Leader of the Liberal Democratic Party, while the upper chamber House of Councillors chose Ichirō Ozawa, Leader of the Democratic Party. With the supremacy of the House of Representatives, Asō was therefore elected. He then announced his cabinet, in a departure from usual practice which Chief Cabinet Secretary gave the announcement.

On the next day, the cabinet agreed on the succession line of the acting premiership, and to return 10% of the ministerial salary to the national treasury as per previous cabinets' decisions.

=== Call for early election ===
The cabinet was formed with Asō's overwhelming support in the party, and was expected to lead the party in another poll. The opposition party called for dissolving the House of Representatives and an early general election. The media also speculated the Prime Minister of what was described as the "acting government" could agree to that.

Tarō Asō reportedly planned to dissolve parliament in October, with a script announcing so was prepared, but the plunge of Nikkei 225 in the 2008 financial crisis later that month and the drop of approval rate forced Asō to postpone the dissolution.

=== Decline in support ===
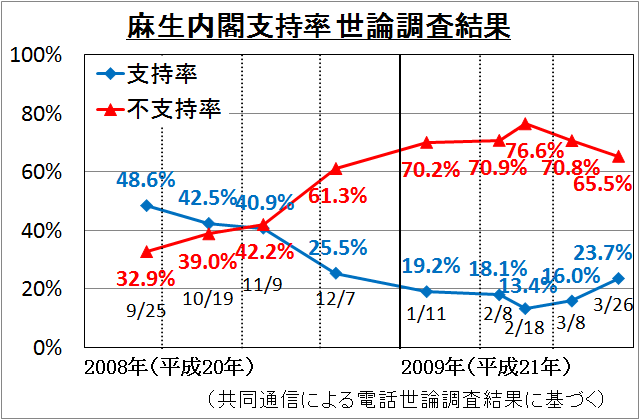
Graph of the cabinet's approval rate, with the blue and red line respectively indicating the support and not support rate

The cabinet enjoyed an approval rate of around 50% at the early stage, but sank to 20% in December 2008 according to the opinion polls by Japanese newspapers. With the division in the party, the confidence of Asō commanding the party in the next election had dropped.

The government faced the impact of the 2008 financial crisis, which dragged its popularity after the cabinet did not submit the financial budget at an earlier time. But the controversies of Prime Minister mispronouncing words and the abrupt resignation of the two successive former Prime Ministers dealt blows to the ruling party as the public lost the trust to the party. The approval rate of the government further slide to 11% in January 2009.

On 17 February, Shōichi Nakagawa resigned as Minister of Finance after his drowsiness in a press conference of G7 meeting. The support rate of the cabinet bounced back as Ichirō Ozawa was hit by scandals. But after Yukio Hatoyama took over as the leader of the opposition, and Minister for Internal Affairs and Communications Kunio Hatoyama resigned on 12 June over replacement of Japan Post Holdings president, the cabinet was losing support again, falling back into "dangerous situation".

=== Dissolution of parliament ===
Since February 2009, some Liberal Democrats has called for the Prime Minister to resign. The privatisation of postal service further divided the party, with some party senior officials blocking the decisions from Tarō Asō in May, and former high-ranking party member publicly urged Asō to step down.

Tarō Asō finally announced the decision on 13 July 2009 to dissolve the House of Representatives and hold an early general election on 30 August through an unusual notice. A censure motion against the Prime Minister was passed by the upper house on 14 July. Some party members believed the election shall be held in Autumn 2008, while others pondered whether Asō will remain as the Prime Minister even if the Liberal Democrats win the election.

=== Resignation ===
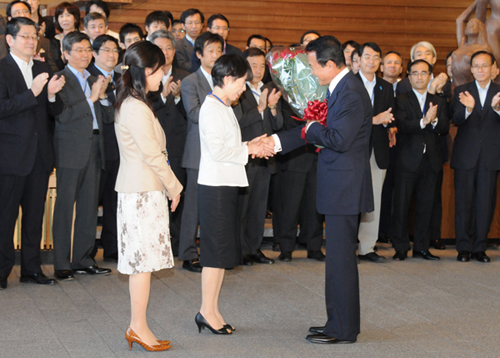
Prime Minister Asō presented with bouquet after resignation

The election on 30 August 2009 saw the disastrous defeat of the Liberal Democratic Party. 6 cabinet ministers lost their re-election bids, and the party lost the majority in the House of Representatives. Tarō Asō announced his resignation at that night. Following their defeat, two cabinet ministers were criticised for giving up the last ministerial duties after being absent from the WTO meeting in September.

On 16 September 2009, Tarō Asō and his cabinet formally resigned in an extraordinary parliament meeting.

== Cabinet ==
=== Summary ===
The average age of the cabinet ministers is 58.2, around four years younger than the previous cabinet. Yūko Obuchi, aged 34 and 9 months when appointed, became the youngest post-WWII minister. Kaoru Yosano was the oldest minister in the cabinet at the age of 70. Five ministers from the last cabinet stayed in office while other five entered the cabinet for the first time. The government was also nicknamed the "hereditary cabinet" as the fathers or grandfathers of four cabinet members had served as the Prime Minister, including Prime Minister himself, Kunio Hatoyama, Hirofumi Nakasone, and Yūko Obuchi.

=== Departures ===
Nariaki Nakayama resigned as Minister of Land, Infrastructure, Transport and Tourism just five days after assuming office over controversial comments. Parliamentary Secretary for the Cabinet Office Kenta Matsunami was sacked in January 2009 after voting abstain for amended budget. Shōichi Nakagawa resigned as Minister of Finance in February. In March, Koichi Hirata resigned as Deputy Minister of Finance for breaching ministerial code. Yoshitada Konoike resigned as Deputy Cabinet Secretary in May over expenses scandal. Minister for Internal Affairs and Communications Kunio Hatoyama resigned on 12 June after president of postal service stayed in office, who was followed by Tōru Toida's resignation as Parliamentary Secretary for Minister of Health, Labour, and Welfare.

Chuko Hayakawa and Yoshihisa Furukawa, who served as Parliamentary Secretary for Minister of Justice and Minister of Environment, also offered to step down after Hatoyama's quit. Both eventually stayed.

=== Ministers ===
The bracket after the party indicates the faction. "Hse" refers to the Houses of National Diet, with "R" as House of Representatives and "C" as House of Councillors.

| Portfolio | Minister | Party | Hse | Term | Remarks |
|---|---|---|---|---|---|
| Prime Minister | Tarō Asō | LDP (Shikōkai) | R | 24 September 2008 – 16 September 2009 | Party Leader |
| Minister for Internal Affairs and Communications; Minister of State for Decentralization Reform | Kunio Hatoyama | LDP (Heisei Kenkyūkai) | R | 24 September 2008 – 12 June 2009 | Third-in-line for acting PM |
| Minister for Internal Affairs and Communications; Minister of State for Decentralization Reform | Tsutomu Sato | LDP (Kōchikai) | R | 12 June 2009 – 16 September 2009 | |
| Minister of Justice | Eisuke Mori | LDP (Shikōkai) | R | 24 September 2008 – 16 September 2009 | New minister |
| Minister for Foreign Affairs | Hirofumi Nakasone | LDP (Shisuikai) | C | 24 September 2008 – 16 September 2009 | |
| Minister of Finance; Minister of State for Financial Services | Shōichi Nakagawa | LDP (Shisuikai) | R | 24 September 2008 – 17 February 2009 | Fourth-in-line for acting PM |
| Minister of Finance; Minister of State for Financial Services | Kaoru Yosano | LDP | R | 17 February 2009 – 16 September 2009 | Second-in-line for acting PM |
| Minister of Education, Culture, Sports, Science and Technology | Ryū Shionoya | LDP (Seiwa Seisaku Kenkyūkai) | R | 24 September 2008 – 16 September 2009 | New minister |
| Minister of Health, Labour and Welfare | Yōichi Masuzoe | LDP | C | 24 September 2008 – 16 September 2009 | |
| Minister of Agriculture, Forestry and Fisheries | Shigeru Ishiba | LDP (Heisei Kenkyūkai) | R | 24 September 2008 – 16 September 2009 | Fifth-in-line for acting PM (since June 2009) |
| Minister of Economy, Trade and Industry | Toshihiro Nikai | LDP (Atarashii Nami) | R | 24 September 2008 – 16 September 2009 | Fourth-in-line for acting PM (fifth until 2009 June) |
| Minister of Land, Infrastructure, Transport and Tourism | Nariaki Nakayama | LDP (Seiwa Seisaku Kenkyūkai) | R | 24 September 2008 – 28 September 2008 | |
| Minister of Land, Infrastructure, Transport and Tourism | Takeo Kawamura | LDP (Shisuikai) | R | 28 September 2008 – 29 September 2008 | Chief Cabinet Secretary, Acting |
| Minister of Land, Infrastructure, Transport and Tourism | Kazuyoshi Kaneko | LDP (Kōchikai) | R | 29 September 2008 – 16 September 2009 | |
| Minister of the Environment | Tetsuo Saito | Komeito | R | 24 September 2008 – 16 September 2009 | |
| Minister of Defense | Yasukazu Hamada | LDP | R | 24 September 2008 – 16 September 2009 | |
| Chief Cabinet Secretary | Takeo Kawamura | LDP (Shisuikai) | R | 24 September 2008 – 16 September 2009 | Also Minister for the Abduction Issue; First-in-line for acting PM |
| Chair of the National Public Safety Commission; Minister of State for Okinawa and Northern Territories Affairs; Minister of State for Disaster Management | Tsutomu Sato | LDP (Kōchikai) | R | 24 September 2008 – 2 July 2009 | New minister |
| Chair of the National Public Safety Commission; Minister of State for Okinawa and Northern Territories Affairs; Minister of State for Disaster Management | Motoo Hayashi | LDP (Kinmirai Seiji Kenkyūkai) | R | 2 July 2009 – 16 September 2009 | |
| Minister of State for Economic and Fiscal Policy | Kaoru Yosano | LDP | R | 24 September 2008 – 2 July 2009 | Second-in-line for acting PM |
| Minister of State for Economic and Fiscal Policy | Yoshimasa Hayashi | LDP (Kōchikai) | C | 2 July 2009 – 16 September 2009 | |
| Minister of State for Regulatory Reform | Akira Amari | LDP (Kinmirai Seiji Kenkyūkai) | R | 24 September 2008 – 16 September 2009 | Also Minister for Government Reform, Minister for Civil Service Reform; Third-in-line for acting PM (fifth until February 2009, fourth until June 2009) |
| Minister of State for Science and Technology Policy; Minister of State for Food Safety; Minister of State for Consumer | Seiko Noda | LDP | R | 24 September 2008 – 16 September 2009 | |
| Minister of State for Measures for Declining Birthrate; Minister of State for Gender Equality | Yūko Obuchi | LDP (Heisei Kenkyūkai) | R | 24 September 2008 – 16 September 2009 | New minister |
Other Officers
| Deputy Chief Cabinet Secretary (Political Affairs - House of Representatives) | Jun Matsumoto | LDP | R | 24 September 2008 - 16 September 2009 | |
| Deputy Chief Cabinet Secretary (Political Affairs - House of Councillors) | Yoshitada Konoike | LDP | C | 24 September 2008 - 13 May 2009 | |
| Deputy Chief Cabinet Secretary (Political Affairs - House of Councillors) | Katsuhito Asano | LDP | C | 13 May 2009 - 16 September 2009 | |
| Deputy Chief Cabinet Secretary (Bureaucrat) | Iwao Uruma | Independent | - | 24 September 2008 - 16 September 2009 | |
