= Yukio Hatoyama cabinet =

Japanese cabinet

Yukio Hatoyama Cabinet
- 93rd Cabinet of Japan
- 16 September 2009 – 8 June 2010
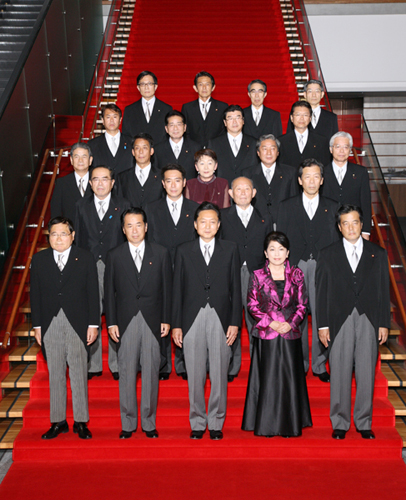
- Prime Minister Yukio Hatoyama (front row, centre) with the newly-elected cabinet inside the Kantei, September 16, 2009
- Date formed: September 16, 2009
- Date dissolved: June 8, 2010

People and organisations
- Emperor: Akihito
- Prime Minister: Yukio Hatoyama
- Deputy Prime Minister: Naoto Kan
- Member parties: Democratic Party; Social Democratic; People's New Party
- Status in legislature: Coalition government HoR (Lower): Supermajority coalition HoC: Majority coalition
- Opposition party: Liberal Democratic Party; Komeito; Japanese Communist Party; Your Party; Social Democratic Party; New Party Nippon; New Party Daichi
- Opposition leader: Sadakazu Tanigaki (LDP)

History
- Election: 2009 Japanese general election
- Predecessor: Asō
- Successor: Kan

The Yukio Hatoyama Cabinet governed Japan from September 2009 to June 2010, following the landslide victory of the Democratic Party of Japan in the general election on 30 August 2009. The election marked the first time in Japanese post-war history that voters delivered the control of the government to the opposition. The cabinet was also the first since Hata Cabinet in 1994 that included no members of the LDP.

== Political background ==
Yukio Hatoyama and the DPJ came into power after their historic victory in the 2009 general election. The DPJ won more than 300 House of Representatives seats in the election and inflicted the worst defeat for a sitting government in modern Japanese history to the LDP. Hatoyama entered office with high approval ratings amid high public expectations to recover the Great Recession-hit economy and reform Japan's stagnant politics. These high expectations contributed to a drop in popularity of the government. The government became more unpopular after it broke a campaign promise of closing down an American air base in Okinawa Prefecture. Hatoyama initially moved to close down the base after the election, but relented to the pressure from the American government. Hatoyama also cited the escalation of tension in the Korean Peninsula following the sinking of South Korean Navy corvette Cheonan as a factor that contributed to the base being kept. The continuous drop in the government's approval ratings led to Hatoyama's resignation on 2 June 2010.

During his short premiership, Hatoyama managed to pass a relatively significant amount of progressive reforms, including the introduction of new social benefits for families, a marked increase in the education budget, the abolition of public high school tuition fees and welfare expansion. Japan also developed a more Asia-focused policy and a warmer relations with China under Hatoyama, culminated with a visit by then-Vice President Xi Jinping to Tokyo in January 2010.

== Election of the prime minister ==
16 September 2009
House of Representatives Absolute majority (241/480) required
Choice	Vote	
Choice	Caucuses	Votes
Yukio Hatoyama	DPJ (308), SDP (7), Your Party (5), PNP (3), Independent (2), NPN (1), NPD (1), Independent [Speaker] (1)	327 / 480
Masatoshi Wakabayashi	LDP (118), Independent [Vice Speaker] (1)	119 / 480
Natsuo Yamaguchi	Kōmeitō (21)	21 / 480
Kazuo Shii	JCP (9)	9 / 480
Takeo Hiranuma	Hiranuma Group independents (3), Independent (1)	4 / 480
Source: 172nd Diet Session (House of Representatives) (roll call only lists individual votes, not grouped by caucus)

16 September 2009
House of Councillors Absolute majority (119/237) required
Choice	Vote	
Choice	Caucuses	Votes
Yukio Hatoyama	DPJーShin-Ryokufūkai (117), SDP (5), Independents [Keiko Itokazu and Ryūhei Kawada] (2)	124 / 242
Masatoshi Wakabayashi	LDP (84)	84 / 242
Natsuo Yamaguchi	Kōmeitō (21)	21 / 242
Kazuo Shii	JCP (7)	7 / 242
Blank ballot	Independent [Vice President] (1)	1 / 242
Did not vote	Independent [President] (1), LDP (1)	2 / 242
Vacant		2 / 242
Source: 172nd Diet Session (House of Councillors) (lists individual votes grouped by caucus)

== Lists of ministers ==
Democratic
Social Democratic
People's New
R = Member of the House of Representatives
C = Member of the House of Councillors

=== Cabinet ===
Cabinet of Yukio Hatoyama from September 16, 2009 to June 8, 2010
Portfolio	Minister		Term
Prime Minister	Yukio Hatoyama	R	September 16, 2009 – June 8, 2010
Deputy Prime Minister; Minister of State for Economic and Fiscal Policy	Naoto Kan	R	September 16, 2009 – June 8, 2010
Minister for Internal Affairs and Communications; Minister of State for Promotion of Local Sovereignty	Kazuhiro Haraguchi	R	September 16, 2009 – June 8, 2010
Minister of Justice	Keiko Chiba	C	September 16, 2009 – June 8, 2010
Minister of Foreign Affairs	Katsuya Okada	R	September 16, 2009 – June 8, 2010
Minister of Finance	Hirohisa Fujii	R	September 16, 2009 – January 7, 2010
Minister of Finance	Naoto Kan	R	January 7 – June 8, 2010
Minister of Education, Culture, Sports, Science and Technology	Tatsuo Kawabata	R	September 16, 2009 – June 8, 2010
Minister of Health, Labour, and Welfare; Minister of State for Pension Reform	Akira Nagatsuma	R	September 16, 2009 – June 8, 2010
Minister of Agriculture, Forestry and Fisheries	Hirotaka Akamatsu	R	September 16, 2009 – June 8, 2010
Minister of Economy, Trade and Industry	Masayuki Naoshima	C	September 16, 2009 – June 8, 2010
Minister of Land, Infrastructure, Transport and Tourism; Minister of State for Okinawa and Northern Territories Affairs	Seiji Maehara	R	September 16, 2009 – June 8, 2010
Minister of the Environment	Sakihito Ozawa	R	September 16, 2009 – June 8, 2010
Minister of Defence	Toshimi Kitazawa	C	September 16, 2009 – June 8, 2010
Chief Cabinet Secretary; Minister in charge of Alleviating the Burden of the Bases in Okinawa	Hirofumi Hirano	R	September 16, 2009 – June 8, 2010
Chairman of the National Public Safety Commission; Minister of State for the Abduction Issue	Hiroshi Nakai	R	September 16, 2009 – June 8, 2010
Minister of State for Disaster Management	Seiji Maehara	R	September 16, 2009 – January 12, 2010
Minister of State for Disaster Management	Hiroshi Nakai	R	January 12 – June 8, 2010
Minister of State for Financial Services; Minister of State for Postal Reform	Shizuka Kamei	R	September 16, 2009 – June 8, 2010
Minister of State for Consumer Affairs and Food Safety; Minister of State for Measures for Declining Birthrate; Minister of State for Gender Equality	Mizuho Fukushima	C	September 16, 2009 – May 28, 2010
Minister of State for Consumer Affairs and Food Safety; Minister of State for Measures for Declining Birthrate; Minister of State for Gender Equality	Hirofumi Hirano	R	May 28 – June 8, 2010
Minister of State for Science and Technology Policy	Naoto Kan	R	September 16, 2009 – January 7, 2010
Minister of State for Science and Technology Policy	Tatsuo Kawabata	R	January 7 – June 8, 2010
Minister of State for the New Public Commons; Minister of State for Civil Service Reform; Minister of State for National Policy	Yoshito Sengoku	R	September 16, 2009 – June 8, 2010
Minister of State for Government Revitalization	Yoshito Sengoku	R	September 16, 2009 – February 10, 2010
Minister of State for Government Revitalization	Yukio Edano	R	February 10 – June 8, 2010
