= Minister of State for Decentralization Reform =

The Minister of State for Decentralization Reform (地方分権改革担当大臣, Chihō Bunken Kaikaku Tantō Daijin) was a member of the Cabinet of Japan who was responsible for Decentralization Reform. The position was abolished during the 2nd administration of Shinzō Abe. The last minister was Yoshitaka Shindō.

== Ministers of State for Decentralization Reform ==
#	Image	Name	Took office	Left office	Cabinet
21st century
1		Yoshihide Suga	September 26, 2006	August 27, 2007	Shinzō Abe
2		Hiroya Masuda	August 27, 2007	September 24, 2008	Shinzō Abe; Yasuo Fukuda
3		Kunio Hatoyama	September 24, 2008	June 12, 2009	Tarō Asō
4		Tsutomu Sato	June 12, 2009	September 16, 2009	Tarō Asō
Position abolished following election of Democratic Party of Japan government, restored following re-election of Liberal Democratic Party
5		Yoshitaka Shindō	December 26, 2012	September 3, 2014	Shinzō Abe
Position abolished
