= Yasuo Fukuda cabinet =

Cabinet of Yasuo Fukuda

Yasuo Fukuda Cabinet
- 91st Cabinet of Japan
- 26 September 2007 – 24 September 2008
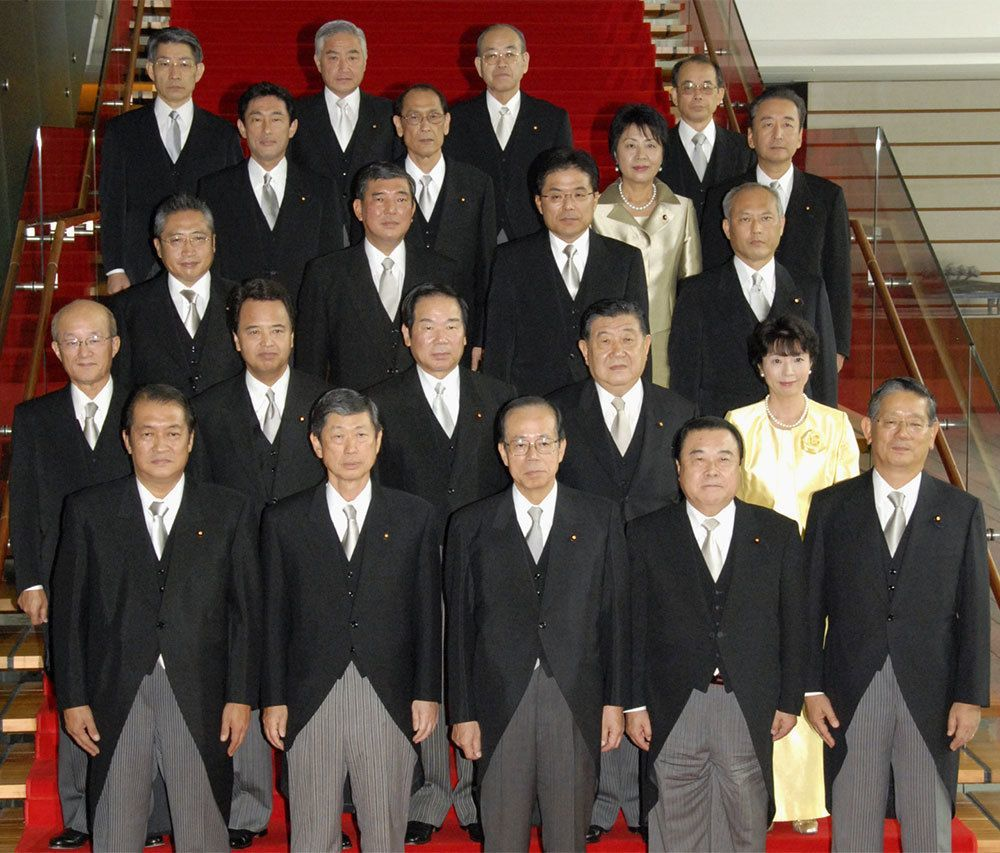
- Prime Minister Yasuo Fukuda (front row, centre) with the newly-elected cabinet inside the Kantei, September 26, 2007
- Date formed: September 26, 2007
- Date dissolved: September 24, 2008

People and organisations
- Head of state: Emperor Akihito
- Head of government: Yasuo Fukuda
- Member party: LDP–NKP Coalition
- Status in legislature: HoR: LDP-K Coalition supermajority HoC: LDP-K Coalition majority
- Opposition party: Democratic Party of Japan
- Opposition leader: Ichirō Ozawa

History
- Legislature term: 172th National Diet
- Predecessor: Abe I
- Successor: Asō

The Yasuo Fukuda Cabinet governed Japan under the leadership of Prime Minister Yasuo Fukuda from September 2007 to September 2008. The government was a coalition between the Liberal Democratic Party and the Komeito and controlled both the upper and lower houses of the National Diet.

== Lists of ministers ==
Liberal Democratic
New Komeito
Independent
R = Member of the House of Representatives
C = Member of the House of Councillors

=== Cabinet ===
Yasuo Fukuda Cabinet from September 26, 2007 to August 2, 2008
Portfolio	Minister		Term of office
Prime Minister	Yasuo Fukuda	R	September 26, 2007 – September 24, 2008
Minister for Internal Affairs and Communications; Minister of State for Decentralization Reform; Minister of State for Regional Revitalization, Regional Government (doshu-sei); Minister of State for Privatization of the Postal Services	Hiroya Masuda	–	August 27, 2007 – September 24, 2008
Minister of Justice	Kunio Hatoyama	R	August 27, 2007 – August 2, 2008
Minister of Foreign Affairs	Masahiko Kōmura	R	September 26, 2007 – September 24, 2008
Minister of Finance	Fukushiro Nukaga	R	August 27, 2007 – August 2, 2008
Minister of Education, Culture, Sports, Science and Technology	Kisaburo Tokai	R	September 26, 2007 – August 2, 2008
Minister of Health, Labour, and Welfare	Yōichi Masuzoe	C	27 August 2007 – 16 September 2009
Minister of Agriculture, Forestry and Fisheries	Masatoshi Wakabayashi	C	September 3, 2007 – August 2, 2008
Minister of Economy, Trade and Industry	Akira Amari	R	September 26, 2006 – August 2, 2008
Ministry of Land, Infrastructure, Transport and Tourism; Minister for Ocean Policy	Tetsuzo Fuyushiba	R	September 26, 2006 – August 2, 2008
Minister of the Environment; Minister in Charge of Global Environmental Problems	Ichirō Kamoshita	R	August 27, 2007 – August 2, 2008
Minister of Defense	Shigeru Ishiba	R	September 26, 2007 – August 2, 2008
Chief Cabinet Secretary; Minister of State for the Abduction Issue	Nobutaka Machimura	R	September 26, 2007 – September 24, 2008
Minister of State, Chairman of the National Public Safety Commission; Minister of State for Disaster Management and Food Safety	Shinya Izumi	C	August 27, 2007 – September 24, 2008
Minister of State for Okinawa and Northern Territories Affairs; Minister of State for Science and Technology Policy; Minister of State for Innovation; Minister of State for Gender Equality; Minister of State for Social Affairs and Food Safety	Fumio Kishida	R	September 26, 2006 – August 2, 2008
Minister of State for Financial Services and Administrative Reform; Minister of State for Civil Service Reform	Yoshimi Watanabe	R	August 27, 2007 – September 24, 2008
Minister of State for Economic and Fiscal Policy	Hiroko Ōta	–	September 26, 2006 – September 24, 2008
Minister of State for Gender Equality and Social Affairs; Minister of State for Public Records Management and National Archives	Yōko Kamikawa	R	September 26, 2007 – September 24, 2008
Deputy Secretaries
Deputy Chief Cabinet Secretary (Political Affairs - House of Representatives)	Matsushige Ono	R	August 27, 2007 – August 2, 2008
Deputy Chief Cabinet Secretary (Political Affairs - House of Councillors)	Mitsuhide Iwaki	C	August 27, 2007 – September 24, 2008
Deputy Chief Cabinet Secretary (Bureaucrat)	Masahiro Futahashi	–	September 26, 2007 – September 24, 2008

=== Reshuffled cabinet ===
Yasuo Fukuda Cabinet (Reshuffle)
- 91st Cabinet of Japan

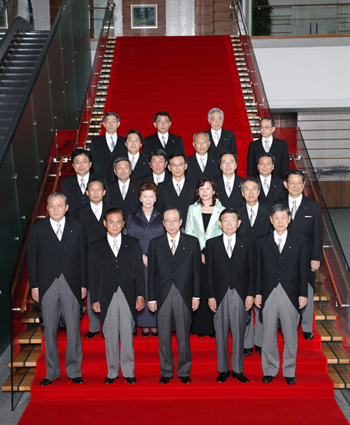
- Prime Minister Yasuo Fukuda (front row, centre) with his reshuffled cabinet inside the Kantei, August 2, 2008
- Date formed: August 2, 2008
- Date dissolved: September 24, 2008

People and organisations
- Head of state: Emperor Akihito
- Head of government: Yasuo Fukuda
- Member party: LDP–NKP Coalition
- Status in legislature: HoR: LDP-K Coalition supermajority HoC: LDP-K Coalition majority
- Opposition party: Democratic Party of Japan
- Opposition leader: Ichirō Ozawa

History
- Legislature term: 172th National Diet
- Predecessor: Yasuo Fukuda Cabinet
- Successor: Asō Cabinet

Yasuo Fukuda Cabinet from August 2, 2008 to September 24, 2008
Portfolio	Minister		Term of office
Prime Minister	Yasuo Fukuda	R	September 26, 2007 – September 24, 2008
Minister for Internal Affairs and Communications; Minister of State for Decentralization Reform; Minister of State for Correcting Regional Disparities; Minister of State for Regional Government (doshu-sei); Minister of State for Privatization of the Postal Services	Hiroya Masuda	–	August 27, 2007 – September 24, 2008
Minister of Justice	Okiharu Yasuoka	R	August 2, 2008 – September 24, 2008
Minister of Foreign Affairs	Masahiko Kōmura	R	September 26, 2007 – September 24, 2008
Minister of Finance	Bunmei Ibuki	R	August 2, 2008 – September 24, 2008
Minister of Education, Culture, Sports, Science and Technology	Tsuneo Suzuki	R	August 2, 2008 – September 24, 2008
Minister of Health, Labour, and Welfare	Yōichi Masuzoe	C	August 27, 2007 – September 26, 2009
Minister of Agriculture, Forestry and Fisheries	Seiichi Ota	R	August 2, 2008 – September 19, 2008
Minister of Agriculture, Forestry and Fisheries	Nobutaka Machimura	R	September 19, 2008 – September 24, 2008
Minister of Economy, Trade and Industry	Toshihiro Nikai	R	August 2, 2008 – September 16, 2009
Ministry of Land, Infrastructure, Transport and Tourism; Minister for Ocean Policy	Sadakazu Tanigaki	R	August 2, 2008 – September 24, 2008
Minister of the Environment	Tetsuo Saito	R	August 2, 2008 – September 16, 2009
Minister of Defense	Yoshimasa Hayashi	C	August 2, 2008 – September 24, 2008
Chief Cabinet Secretary	Nobutaka Machimura	R	September 26, 2007 – September 24, 2008
Minister of State, Chairman of the National Public Safety Commission; Minister of State for Okinawa and Northern Territories Affairs; Minister of State for Disaster Management	Motoo Hayashi	R	August 2, 2008 – September 24, 2008
Minister of State for Financial Services; Minister of State for Administrative Reform; Minister of State for Civil Service Reform	Toshimitsu Motegi	R	August 2, 2008 – September 24, 2008
Minister of State for Economic and Fiscal Policy; Minister of State for Regulatory Reform	Kaoru Yosano	R	August 2, 2008 – September 24, 2008
Minister of State for Science and Technology Policy; Minister of State for Food Safety; Minister of State for Consumer Affairs; Minister of State for Space Policy	Seiko Noda	R	August 2, 2008 – September 24, 2008
Minister of State for Social Affairs and Gender Equality; Minister of State for Public Records Management and National Archives; Minister of State for the Abduction Issue	Kyoko Nakayama	C	August 2, 2008 – September 24, 2008
Deputy Secretaries
Deputy Chief Cabinet Secretary (Political Affairs - House of Representatives)	Ryu Shionoya	R	August 2, 2008 – September 24, 2008
Deputy Chief Cabinet Secretary (Political Affairs - House of Councillors)	Mitsuhide Iwaki	C	August 27, 2007 – September 24, 2008
Deputy Chief Cabinet Secretary (Bureaucrat)	Masahiro Futahashi	–	September 26, 2007 – September 24, 2008
