= Tokyo 2nd district =

Japan House of Representatives constituency

Tokyo 2nd District
- Parliamentary constituency for the Japanese House of Representatives
- Numbered map of inner Tokyo single-member districts
- Prefecture: Tokyo
- Proportional District: Tokyo
- Electorate: 424,273 (2012)

Current constituency
- Created: 1994
- Seats: One
- Party: LDP
- Representative: Kiyoto Tsuji
- Created from: Tokyo 8th district
- Wards: Chūō, Taitō

Tokyo 2nd district (東京都第2区 Tōkyō-to dai-ni-ku or simply 東京2区 Tōkyō ni-ku) is a constituency of the House of Representatives in the Diet of Japan (national legislature). It is located in eastern mainland Tokyo and covers central parts of the former Tokyo City. The district consists of the wards of Chūō and Taitō. As of 2012, 424,273 eligible voters were registered in the district.

Before the electoral reform of 1994, the area formed Tokyo 8th district where two Representatives had been elected by single non-transferable vote. The current Representative for the 2nd district is Liberal Democrat Kiyoto Tsuji who won in the 2012 Representatives election with less than a third of the vote.

== List of representatives ==
Representative	Party	Dates	Notes
Kunio Hatoyama	DPJ	1996 – 1999	Resigned for the 1999 Tokyo gubernatorial election
Yoshikatsu Nakayama	DPJ	1999 – 2005	Failed reelection in the Tokyo PR block
Takashi Fukaya	LDP	2005 – 2009	
Yoshikatsu Nakayama	DPJ	2009 – 2012	Failed re-election in the Tokyo block
Kiyoto Tsuji	LDP	2012 –	Incumbent

== Election results ==
2026
Party	Candidate	Votes	%	±%
LDP	Kiyoto Tsuji	84,690	43.3	▲6.2
DPP	Kiichirō Hatoyama	36,021	18.4	▼8.8
Team Mirai	Akihiro Dobashi (elected in Tokyo PR block)	25,018	12.8	
Ishin	Mitsuru Imamura	16.609	8.5	▼8.3
JCP	Mari Hosono	15,358	7.8	▼4.7
Sanseitō	Yūsuke Kaieda	13,844	7.1	▲0.7
The Path To Rebirth	Cocoro Amano	4,162	2.1	
Registered electors		326,823		
Turnout			61.29	▲4.17
LDP hold				

2024
Party	Candidate	Votes	%	±%
LDP	Kiyoto Tsuji	66,050	37.09	▼6.35
DPP	Kiichirō Hatoyama (elected in Tokyo PR block)	48,527	27.25	New
Ishin	Mitsuru Imamura	29,860	16.77	▲0.07
JCP	Mari Hosono	22,316	12.53	New
Sanseitō	Yoshinori Mogami	11,322	6.36	New
Registered electors		322,489		
Turnout			57.12	▼3.70
LDP hold				

2021
Party	Candidate	Votes	%	±%
LDP	Kiyoto Tsuji	119,281	43.44	▼2.46
CDP	Akihiro Matsuo	90,422	32.93	▼4.13
Ishin	Takatane Kiuchi	45,754	16.7	New
Reiwa	Itaru Kitamura	14,487	5.3	new
Independent	Shinichiro Deguchi	4,659	1.7	New
Turnout		274,603	60.82	▲2.82
LDP hold		Swing	-2.46	

2014
Party	Candidate	Votes	%	±%
LDP (K)	Kiyoto Tsuji	103,954	42.6	▲10.2
DPJ	Yoshikatsu Nakayama	58,407	23.9	▼0.8
JIP	Toshiaki Ōkuma	44,550	18.3	▼0.3
JCP	Noriyuki Ishizawa	32,296	13.2	new
Others	Katsuko Inumaru	4,668	1.9	new

2012
Party	Candidate	Votes	%	±%
LDP	Kiyoto Tsuji	84,663	32.4	
DPJ (PNP)	Yoshikatsu Nakayama	64,676	24.7	
YP	Toshiaki Ōkuma (elected by PR)	48,704	18.6	
JRP	Kazumi Matsumoto	38,564	14.7	
JCP	Fumihiko Kuwana	23,035	8.8	
Independent	Masahiro Inoue	2,045	0.8	

2009
Party	Candidate	Votes	%	±%
DPJ (PNP support)	Yoshikatsu Nakayama	138,603		
LDP (Kōmeitō support)	Takashi Fukaya	98,593		
JCP	Tsukane Nakajima	26,172		
Independent	Hiroko Tanaka	4,579		
HRP	Bunkō Katō	1,924		
Independent	Jun Chiba	1,748		
Turnout		277,779	68.53	

2005
Party	Candidate	Votes	%	±%
LDP	Takashi Fukaya	127,889		
DPJ	Yoshikatsu Nakayama	98,335		
JCP	Tsukane Nakajima	24,848		
Turnout		256,897	68.46	

2003
Party	Candidate	Votes	%	±%
DPJ	Yoshikatsu Nakayama	104,477		
LDP	Takashi Fukaya	91,926		
JCP	Kiyokazu Muro	21,334		
Turnout		223,464	62.14	

2000
Party	Candidate	Votes	%	±%
DPJ	Yoshikatsu Nakayama	88,744		
LDP	Takashi Fukaya	81,923		
JCP	Kiyokazu Muro	32,155		
Independent	Hiroshi Sakae	5,371		
LL	Kazuhiko Komatsu	3,665		

1999 by-election
Party	Candidate	Votes	%	±%
DPJ	Yoshikatsu Nakayama	134,265		
JCP	Tsukane Nakajima	36,261		

1996
Party	Candidate	Votes	%	±%
DPJ	Kunio Hatoyama	88,183		
LDP	Takashi Fukaya	68,503		
JCP	Tsukane Nakajima	40,461		
Turnout		202,767	61.85	
