= Tokyo 8th district (1967–1993) =

Legislative district of Japan

Tokyo 8th district was a constituency of the House of Representatives in the Diet of Japan (national legislature). Between 1967 and 1993 it elected three, later two representatives by single non-transferable vote. It was created in a 1964 redistricting form areas that had previously formed part of the 1st district: It consisted of Eastern Tokyo's Chūō, Bunkyō and Taitō special wards, central parts of the former city of Tokyo. In a reapportionment for the 1993 election the number of representatives for Tokyo 8th district was reduced from three to two. Following the 1994 electoral reform, the area now forms the single-member Tokyo 2nd district.

== Summary of results ==
Tokyo 8th district usually went to the LDP with two to one seats while the opposition parties competed for the third seat. Exceptions were the elections of 1979 when the conservative vote was split between three LDP candidates (Takashi Fukaya, Nakasone faction, Kunio Hatoyama, Tanaka faction and Hisanari Yamada, without faction) and 1993 when Kunio Hatoyama had left the LDP to side with the opposition demanding political reform from the LDP. Hatoyama joined Takeo Nishioka's Kaikaku no Kai ("reform assembly") in 1994 that eventually became part of the Liberal Reform League (Jiyū Kaikaku Rengō) later that year.

General election		1967	1969	1972	1976	1979	1980	1983	1986	1990	1993
LDP & conservative independents		2	2	2	2	1	2	2	2	2	1
Opposition	center-left	0	1	0	1	1	0	1	0	0	1
Opposition	JSP	1	0	0	0	0	0	0	0	0	0
Opposition	JCP	0	0	1	0	1	1	0	1	1	0
Seats up		3									2

== Elected representatives ==
election year	highest vote (top tōsen)	2nd	3rd
1967	Hisanori Yamada (LDP)	Keigo Ida (JSP)	Kyūkichi Shinomiya (LDP)
1969	Hisanori Yamada (LDP)	Kei Ishii (LDP)	Yoshimi Nakagawa (Kōmeitō)
1972	Mitsuhiro Kaneko (JCP)	Hisanori Yamada (LDP)	Takashi Fukaya (Indep.)
1976	Kunio Hatoyama (Indep.)	Hisanori Yamada (LDP)	Yoshimi Nakagawa (Kōmeitō)
1979	Takashi Fukaya (LDP)	Mitsuhiro Kaneko (JCP)	Yoshimi Nakagawa (Kōmeitō)
1980	Takashi Fukaya (LDP)	Mitsuhiro Kaneko (JCP)	Kunio Hatoyama (LDP)
1983	Kunio Hatoyama (LDP)	Yoshimi Nakagawa (Kōmeitō)	Takashi Fukaya (LDP)
1986	Kunio Hatoyama (LDP)	Takashi Fukaya (LDP)	Mitsuhiro Kaneko (JCP)
1990	Kunio Hatoyama (LDP)	Takashi Fukaya (LDP)	Mitsuhiro Kaneko (JCP)
1993	Kunio Hatoyama (Indep.)	Takashi Fukaya (LDP)	–

== Last election result 1993 ==
1993
Party	Candidate	Votes	%	±%
Independent	Kunio Hatoyama	89,800		
LDP	Takashi Fukaya	57,809		
JCP	Mitsuhiro Kaneko	57,395		
Kokumintō (lit. "People's Party")	Yoshiaki Yamazaki	873		
Zatsumintō (lit. "Crude People's Party")	Tamotsu Yoshizawa	751		
Turnout		209,643	63.08	
