= Takashi Fukaya =

Japanese politician (born 1935)

- 深谷 隆司
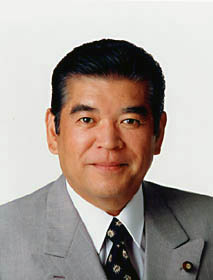
- Official portrait, 1999

Minister of International Trade and Industry
- In office 5 October 1999 – 4 July 2000
- Prime Minister: Keizō Obuchi; Yoshirō Mori
- Preceded by: Kaoru Yosano
- Succeeded by: Takeo Hiranuma

Minister of Home Affairs
- In office 8 August 1995 – 11 January 1996
- Prime Minister: Tomiichi Murayama
- Preceded by: Hiromu Nonaka
- Succeeded by: Hiroyuki Kurata

Chairman of the National Public Safety Commission
- In office 8 August 1995 – 11 January 1996
- Prime Minister: Tomiichi Murayama
- Preceded by: Hiromu Nonaka
- Succeeded by: Hiroyuki Kurata

Minister of Posts and Telecommunications
- In office 28 February 1990 – 28 December 1990
- Prime Minister: Toshiki Kaifu
- Preceded by: Senpachi Ōishi
- Succeeded by: Katsutsugu Sekiya

Member of the House of Representatives
- In office 11 September 2005 – 21 July 2009
- Preceded by: Yoshikatsu Nakayama
- Succeeded by: Yoshikatsu Nakayama
- Constituency: Tokyo 2nd
- In office 7 October 1979 – 2 June 2000
- Preceded by: Hisanari Yamada
- Succeeded by: Multi-member district
- Constituency: Tokyo 8th (1979–1996); Tokyo PR (1996–2000)
- In office 10 December 1972 – 9 December 1976
- Preceded by: Kei Ishii
- Succeeded by: Kunio Hatoyama
- Constituency: Tokyo 8th

Member of the Tokyo Metropolitan Assembly
- In office 1969–1972
- Constituency: Taitō Ward

Personal details
- Born: 29 September 1935 (age 91) Taitō, Tokyo, Japan
- Party: Liberal Democratic
- Education: Waseda University

Takashi Fukaya (深谷 隆司, Fukaya Takashi; born 29 September 1935) is a retired Japanese politician of the Liberal Democratic Party.

== Biography ==
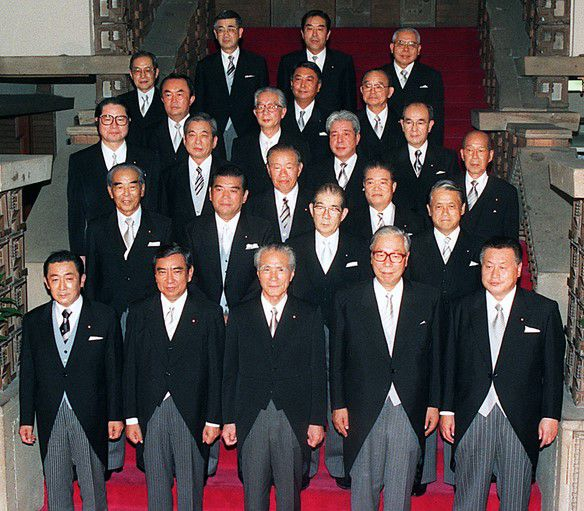
Fukaya with members of the Murayama Reshuffled Cabinet (at the Prime Minister's Official Residence on August 8, 1995)

Takashi was born in the Asakusa area of Taitō, Tokyo, graduated from Waseda University and was a member of the House of Representatives from 1972 to 2000, serving as postal minister in 1990 under Toshiki Kaifu, and as Minister of Home Affairs from 1995 to 1996 under Tomiichi Murayama. He served as Minister of Economy, Trade and Industry (Japan) from 1999 to 2000 under Keizo Obuchi and Yoshiro Mori, but lost his Tokyo 2nd district seat to Yoshikatsu Nakayama in the 2000 general election, forcing his resignation as a cabinet minister.

He returned to the House in the 2005 election, and served there until announcing his retirement by failing to run in the 2012 election.

Political offices
Preceded by Senpachi Ōishi	Minister of Post and Telecommunications; 1990	Succeeded by Katsutsugu Sekiya
Preceded by Hiromu Nonaka	Minister of Home Affairs; Chairman of the National Public Safety Commission; 1995–1996	Succeeded by Hiroyuki Kurata
Preceded by Kaoru Yosano	Minister of International Trade and Industry; 1999–2000	Succeeded by Takeo Hiranuma
House of Representatives (Japan)
Preceded by MMC	Representative for Tokyo 8th district (multi-member); 1972–1976; 1979–1996; Served alongside: Mitsuhiro Kaneko, Hisanori Yamada, Yoshimi Nakagawa, Kunio Hatoyama	District eliminated
Preceded by Yoshikatsu Nakayama	Representative for Tokyo 2nd district 2005–2009	Succeeded by Yoshikatsu Nakayama
Preceded by Moichi Miyazaki	Chairman of the House of Representatives Committee on Communications; 1986–1987	Succeeded by Shunpei Tsukahara
Preceded by Kōsuke Uehara	Chairman of the House of Representatives Committee on Budget; 1996–1997	Succeeded by Hikaru Matsunaga
Preceded by Yuya Niwa	Chairman of the House of Representatives Committee on Fundamental National Policies; 2006	Succeeded by Seishirō Etō
Party political offices
Preceded by Kōichi Hamada	Director of the LDP Youth Division; 1976–1977	Succeeded by Masaaki Nakayama
Preceded by Yoshirō Mori	Chairman of the LDP General Council; 1998–1999	Succeeded by Yukihiko Ikeda
