= Yoshikatsu Nakayama =

Japanese politician (born 1945)

- 中山 義活
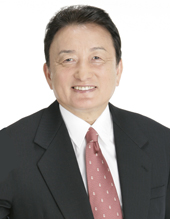
- Official portrait, 2011

Member of the House of Representatives
- In office 30 August 2009 – 16 November 2012
- Preceded by: Takashi Fukaya
- Succeeded by: Kiyoto Tsuji
- Constituency: Tokyo 2nd
- In office 11 April 1999 – 8 August 2005
- Preceded by: Kunio Hatoyama
- Succeeded by: Takashi Fukaya
- Constituency: Tokyo 2nd

Member of the Tokyo Metropolitan Assembly
- In office 1993–1999
- Constituency: Taitō Ward

Member of the Taitō City Assembly
- In office 1979–1991

Personal details
- Born: 13 February 1945 (age 81) Taitō, Tokyo, Japan
- Party: DPP (since 2018)
- Other political affiliations: LDP (before 1993); JRP (1993–1994); NFP (1994–1996); DP 1996 (1996–1998); DPJ (1998–2016); DP 2016 (2016–2018)
- Education: Tokyo University of Education

Yoshikatsu Nakayama (中山 義活, Nakayama Yoshikatsu; born 13 February 1945 in Taitō, Tokyo) is a former Japanese politician and member of the House of Representatives for Tokyo 2nd district. He previously served in the House as a member of the Democratic Party of Japan, and now is a member of the Democratic Party for the People.

== Career ==
Nakayama graduated from the Sports Department of the Tokyo University of Education. After serving three terms in the Taito City Assembly (1979–1991) and two terms in the Tokyo Metropolitan Assembly (1993–1999) for the LDP, the NFP and finally the DPJ, he was elected to the House of Representatives in a 1999 by-election in Tokyo 2nd district. The seat had been vacated when Kunio Hatoyama (then DPJ) resigned for his unsuccessful campaign for governor of Tokyo. Nakayama was re-elected in the House of Representatives general elections of 2000 and 2003. In 2005, he lost his seat to Liberal Democrat Takashi Fukaya and also failed to win a proportional seat in the Tokyo block. In the landslide Democratic victory of 2009, he regained his district seat.

Nakayama has held several Democratic Party posts including vice-chairman of the Diet affairs committee, chairman of the "mobilization committee" (kokumin-undō-iinkai) and vice-president of the DPJ Tokyo prefectural federation. In the Hatoyama cabinet of 2009, he was special advisor to the prime minister for SME policy and "regional revitalization", during the 1st and 2nd reshuffled Kan cabinets of 2010 and 2011 parliamentary secretary of Economy, Trade and Industry. In the 2011 leadership election, he supported Michihiko Kano's bid for the DPJ presidency and subsequently joined Kano's newly formed faction (formally 素交会, Sokōkai) where he became secretary general. In January 2012, he succeeded Osamu Yoshida as chairman of the House of Representatives economy, trade and industry committee (keizai sangyō iinkai, lit. "economy and industry committee"). Later that year he followed Makiko Tanaka who was appointed to the cabinet as chair of the committee on foreign affairs.

=== 2010 comments on women's entrepreneurship ===
As parliamentary secretary in 2010, Nakyama had caused a controversy by remarks made during the APEC Women's Entrepreneurship Summit: His claim that "Japanese women find pleasure in working at home and that has been part of Japanese culture" and similar statements drew angry responses from participants, media and women's rights groups as they spread to the public. Women across Japan formed an online protest group that initiated an e-mail campaign to demand an apology. Nakayama later said he "regrets" his comments.

== Family ==
Nakyama's eldest son Hiroyuki (寛進) is a former member and vice-president of the Taitō City Assembly and candidate for mayor of Taitō in 2011. His second son Tomoyasu (智康) is a former member of the Hokkaido Prefectural Assembly.

House of Representatives (Japan)
Vacant Title last held by Kunio Hatoyama	Member of the House of Representatives from Tokyo 2nd district 1999–2005	Succeeded by Takashi Fukaya
Preceded by Takashi Fukaya	Member of the House of Representatives from Tokyo 2nd district 2009–2012	Succeeded by Kiyoto Tsuji
Preceded by Osamu Yoshida	Chairman of the Committee on Economy, Trade and Industry; 2012	Succeeded by Banri Kaieda
Preceded by Makiko Tanaka	Chairman of the Committee on Foreign Affairs; 2012	Succeeded by Katsuyuki Kawai
