= Kunio Hatoyama =

Japanese politician (1949–2016)

- 鳩山 邦夫
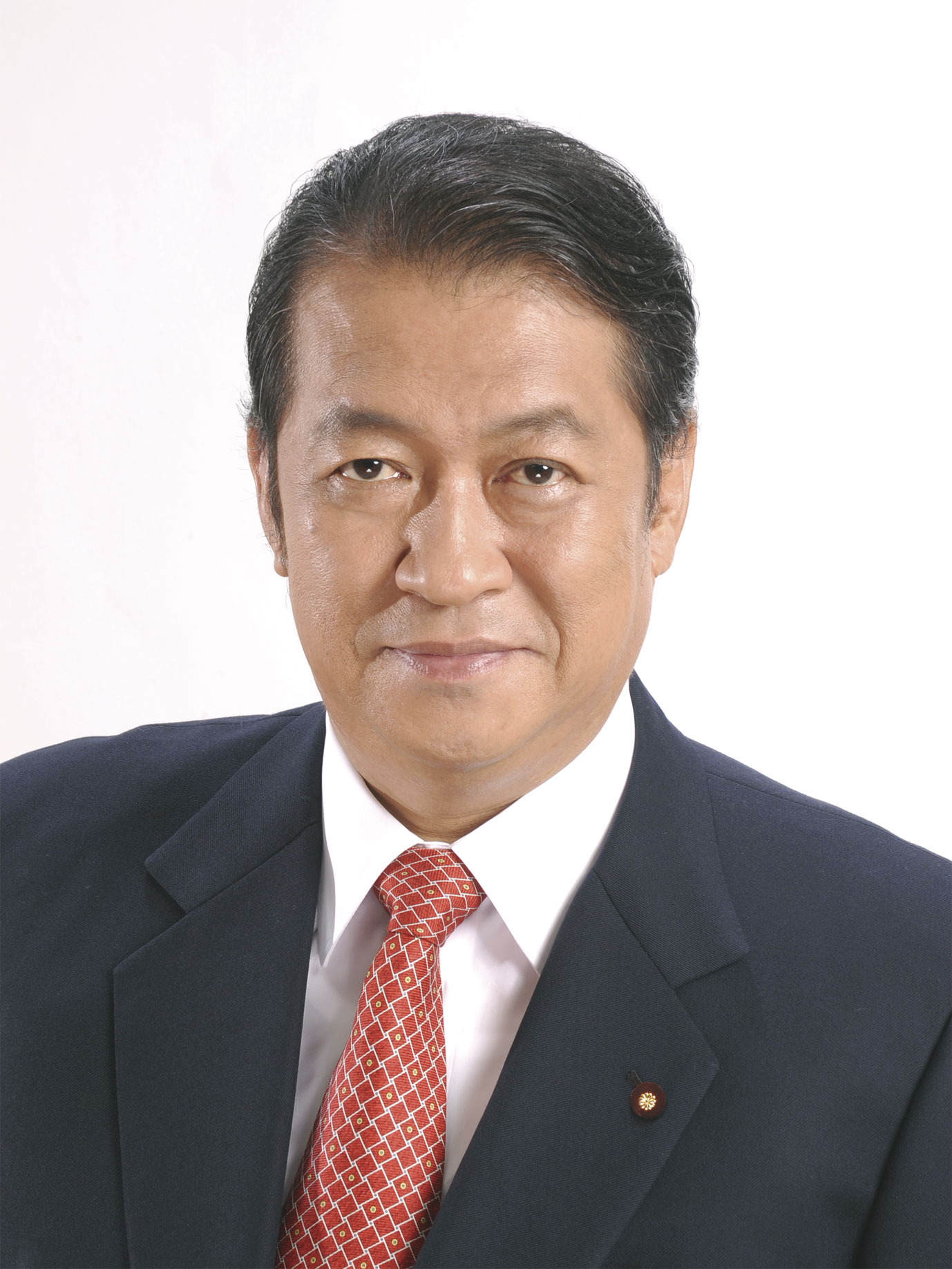
- Official portrait, 2008

Minister for Internal Affairs and Communications
- In office 24 September 2008 – 16 June 2009
- Prime Minister: Tarō Asō
- Preceded by: Hiroya Masuda
- Succeeded by: Tsutomu Sato

Minister of Justice
- In office 27 August 2007 – 2 August 2008
- Prime Minister: Shinzo Abe; Yasuo Fukuda
- Preceded by: Jinen Nagase
- Succeeded by: Okiharu Yasuoka

Minister of Labour
- In office 28 March 1994 – 30 June 1994
- Prime Minister: Tsutomu Hata
- Preceded by: Chikara Sakaguchi
- Succeeded by: Mansō Hamamoto

Minister of Education
- In office 5 November 1991 – 12 December 1992
- Prime Minister: Kiichi Miyazawa
- Preceded by: Yutaka Inoue
- Succeeded by: Mayumi Moriyama

Member of the House of Representatives
- In office 26 June 2000 – 21 June 2016
- Preceded by: Multi-member district
- Succeeded by: Jirō Hatoyama
- Constituency: Tokyo PR (2000–2005); Fukuoka 6th (2005–2016)
- In office 23 June 1980 – 2 March 1999
- Preceded by: Yoshimi Nakagawa
- Succeeded by: Yoshikatsu Nakayama
- Constituency: Tokyo 8th (1980–1993); Tokyo 2nd (1994–1999)
- In office 10 December 1976 – 7 September 1979
- Preceded by: Takashi Fukaya
- Succeeded by: Mitsuhiro Kaneko
- Constituency: Tokyo 8th

Personal details
- Born: 13 September 1948 Tokyo, Japan
- Died: 21 June 2016 (aged 66) Tokyo, Japan
- Party: Liberal Democratic (1978–1993; 2000–2010; 2012–2016)
- Other political affiliations: Independent (1976–1978; 1993–1994; 1999–2000; 2010–2012); NFP (1994–1996); DP (1996–1998); DPJ (1998–1999)
- Spouse: Emily Hatoyama (m. 1973)
- Children: Tarō; Hanako; Jirō
- Relatives: Hatoyama family
- Education: University of Tokyo

Kunio Hatoyama (鳩山邦夫, Hatoyama Kunio; 13 September 1948 – 21 June 2016) was a Japanese politician who served as Minister of Internal Affairs and Communications under Prime Ministers Shinzō Abe and Yasuo Fukuda until 12 June 2009.

== Biography ==
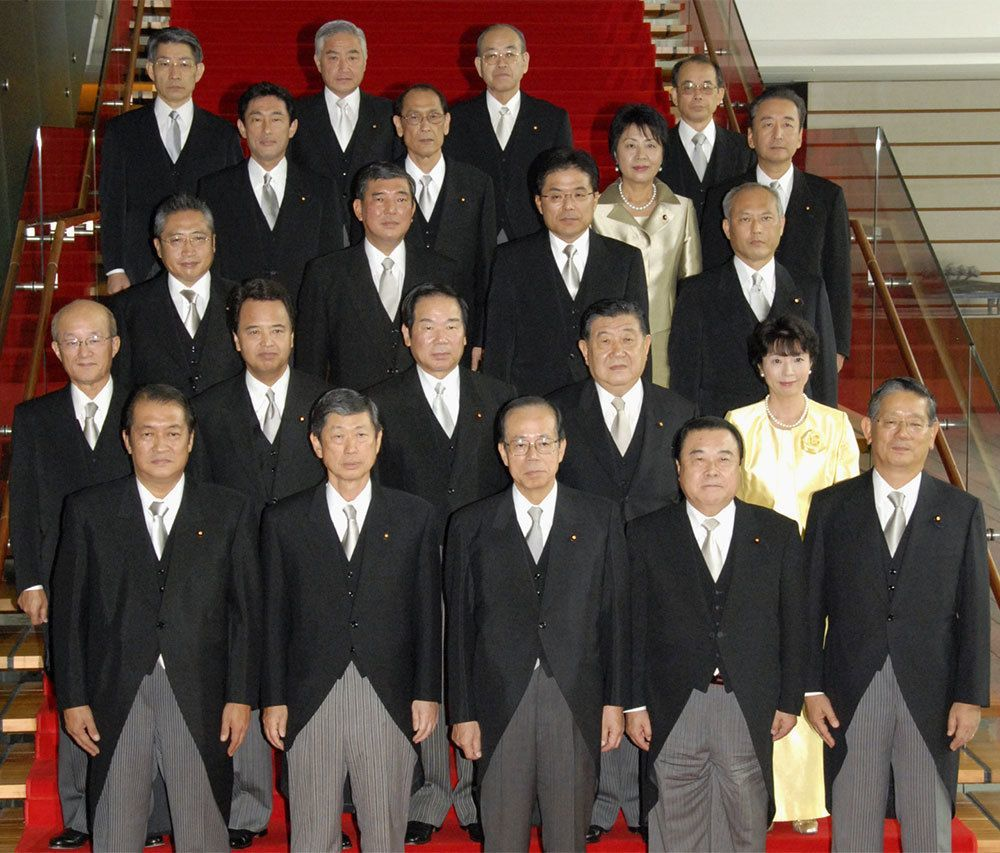
Hatoyama with members of Yasuo Fukuda Cabinet in 2007

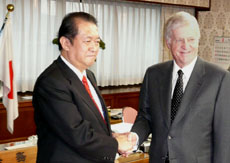
Kunio Hatoyama with American ambassador Tom Schieffer in 2008

Kunio Hatoyama was born in Tokyo in 1949. He was a son of Yasuko Hatoyama and Iichirō Hatoyama, a bureaucrat who later became a third-generation politician, and grandson of Ichirō Hatoyama, who became the President of the Liberal Democratic Party (LDP) and Prime Minister of Japan between 1954 and 1956. His brother Yukio Hatoyama, also a politician and leader of the rival Democratic Party of Japan, became the country's Prime Minister in September 2009 following a landslide victory in the August 2009 election. His maternal grandfather was Shōjirō Ishibashi, founder of Bridgestone.

Hatoyama attended the Faculty of Law at the University of Tokyo and graduated with a degree in political science. He wanted to get into politics right away and became an aide to Prime Minister Kakuei Tanaka. He ran for the House of Representatives in 1976 as a member of the New Liberal Club and entered the LDP after winning.

In 1993, he left the LDP and became a conservative independent, saying he wanted to form a new party to oppose the LDP. He was briefly Minister of Education, Science, Sports and Culture in the Cabinet of Prime Minister Tsutomu Hata.

In 1994, he helped form the now-defunct New Frontier Party, which he left in 1996 to form the Democratic Party of Japan with his brother, Yukio Hatoyama, and became the Vice Leader of the opposition. Divisions between the brothers eventually led him to leave the DPJ in 1999, and he re-joined the LDP in 2000 after running unsuccessfully for the seat of the Governor of Tokyo.

He joined the Shinzō Abe cabinet as Justice Minister in August 2007, and maintained his post through the September inauguration of the cabinet of Yasuo Fukuda. Serial killer Tsutomu Miyazaki was executed during his tenure. After the execution, he was called "Grim Reaper" by the Asahi Shimbun, which made him angry.

Subsequently, in the Cabinet of Prime Minister Tarō Asō, appointed on 24 September 2008, Hatoyama was moved to the post of Minister of Internal Affairs and Communications. In a dispute with Asō over a possible replacement of Japan Post Holdings president Yoshifumi Nishikawa Hatoyama resigned on 12 June 2009.

== Personal life ==
He was married to Emily Hatoyama (née Emily Baird, aka Emily Takami), the daughter of an Australian army sergeant, Jimmy Baird, and a Japanese woman. Emily is a former model and actress. The couple has three children, Tarō Hatoyama, Hanako Hatoyama and Jirō Hatoyama.

Hatoyama died on 21 June 2016 in a hospital in Tokyo, at the age of 67. He was survived by his wife, three children and five grandchildren.

== Controversies ==
=== Views on the death penalty ===
In September 2007, Hatoyama caused a controversy after making a remark during a press conference, where he suggested a system in which execution of death row inmates could take place without him having to sign the final execution order, as currently required by Japanese law. He came under criticism from opponents to capital punishment such as Amnesty International Japan for his attitude, which said that he was trying to avoid accountability as well as showing disregard for human rights.

=== Remarks about the Bali bombing ===
In October 2007, during a news conference, Hatoyama attempted to justify plans to fingerprint and photograph all foreigners at immigration by claiming that an unidentified "friend of a friend", who is an Al-Qaeda terrorist involved in the 2002 Bali bombings, was able to sneak in and out of Japan repeatedly over the following years using different passports and wearing a fake moustache. He added that he had received prior warning to stay away from the centre of Bali because it would be bombed. The remarks were made during a news conference at Foreign Correspondents' Club of Japan in Tokyo, where he was trying to explain the necessity of new anti-terrorism measures being implemented whereby all foreigners entering the country will be fingerprinted and photographed.

Later that day, he gave another press conference in which he retracted his remarks, saying instead that it was actually his friend who had received a prior warning about the bombing, and that he only found out about the warning three or four months after the bombing. He also issued a statement denying any connections to members of Al-Qaeda, as well as apologising to Prime Minister Fukuda for the confusion he caused.

=== Revisionism ===
Hatoyama was affiliated to the openly revisionist organization Nippon Kaigi.

== Ancestry ==
Ancestors of Kunio Hatoyama

8. Hatoyama Kazuo
4. Ichirō Hatoyama
9. Taga Haruko
2. Iichirō Hatoyama
5. Kaoru Hatoyama
1. Kunio Hatoyama
12. Ishibashi Tokujirō
6. Shōjirō Ishibashi
13. Ishibashi Matsu
3. Yasuko Ishibashi

== Election history ==
Election	Age	District	Political party	Number of votes	election results
1976 Japanese general election	28	Tokyo 8th district	Independent	61,207	winning
1979 Japanese general election	31	Tokyo 8th district	LDP	30,584	lost
1980 Japanese general election	31	Tokyo 8th district	LDP	70,866	winning
1983 Japanese general election	35	Tokyo 8th district	LDP	59,897	winning
1986 Japanese general election	37	Tokyo 8th district	LDP	65,008	winning
1990 Japanese general election	41	Tokyo 8th district	LDP	59,850	winning
1993 Japanese general election	44	Tokyo 8th district	Independent	89,800	winning
1996 Japanese general election	48	Tokyo 2nd district	DPJ	88,183	winning
2000 Japanese general election	51	Tokyo proportional representation block	LDP	ーー	winning
2003 Japanese general election	58	Tokyo 18th district	LDP	83,337	elected by PR
2005 Japanese general election	56	Fukuoka 6th district	LDP	131,946	winning
2009 Japanese general election	60	Fukuoka 6th district	LDP	138,327	winning
2012 Japanese general election	64	Fukuoka 6th district	Independent	87,705	winning
2014 Japanese general election	66	Fukuoka 6th district	LDP	116,413	winning

== Notes ==
Political offices
Preceded by Yutaka Inoue	Minister of Education of Japan; 1991–1992	Succeeded by Mayumi Moriyama
Preceded by Chikara Sakaguchi	Minister of Labour of Japan; 1994	Succeeded by Mansō Hamamoto
Preceded by Jinen Nagase	Minister of Justice of Japan; 2007–2008	Succeeded by Okiharu Yasuoka
Preceded by Hiroya Masuda	Minister of Internal Affairs and Communications of Japan; 2008–2009	Succeeded by Tsutomu Sato
Preceded by Hiroya Masuda	Minister of State for Decentralization Reform of Japan; 2008–2009	Succeeded by Tsutomu Sato
House of Representatives (Japan)
Preceded by MMC	Representative for Tokyo 8th district (multi-member); 1976–1979; 1980–1996; Served alongside: Hisanori Yamada, Yoshimi Nakagawa, Takashi Fukaya, Mitsuhiro Kaneko	District eliminated
New district	Representative for Tokyo 2nd district 1996–1999	Vacant Title next held by Yoshikatsu Nakayama
Preceded by N/A	Representative for the Tokyo PR block 2000–2005	Succeeded by N/A
Preceded by Issei Koga	Representative for Fukuoka 6th district 2005–2016	Vacant Title next held by Jirō Hatoyama
Preceded by Iwao Kudo	Chair, Lower House Committee on Education; 1989–1990	Succeeded by Hajime Funada
Preceded by Muneo Suzuki	Chair, Lower House Committee on Rules and Administration; 2002	Succeeded by Yoshinori Ohno
New title	Chair, Lower House Special Committee for Regional Revitalization; 2014–2016	Succeeded by Kozo Yamamoto
