= Tsutomu Sato (politician) =

Japanese politician

- 佐藤 勉
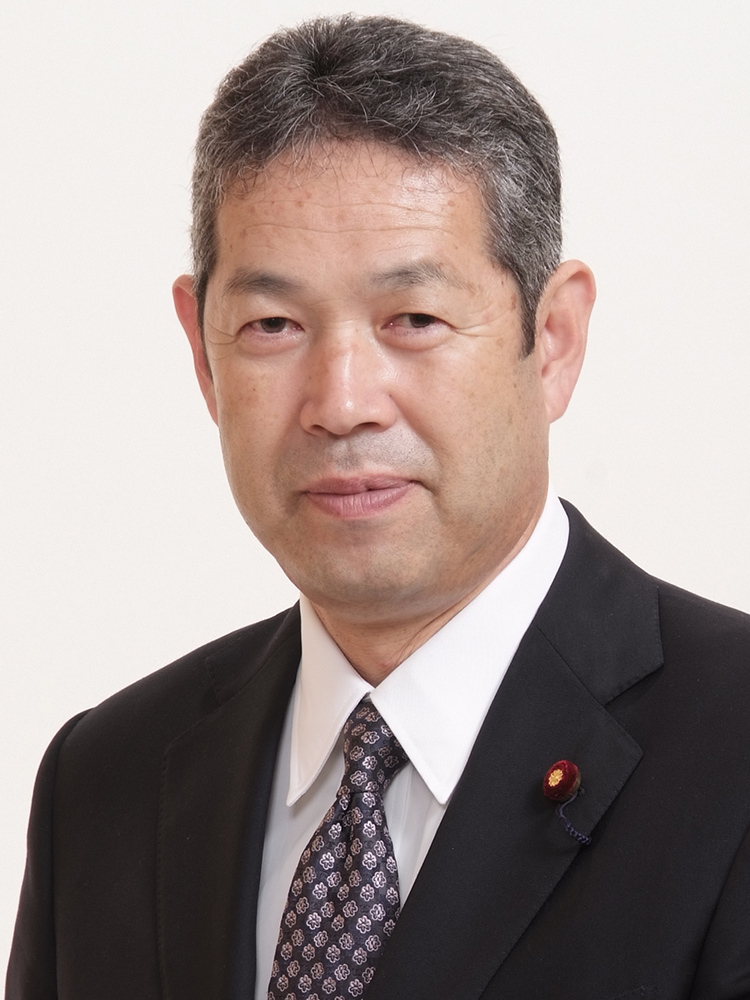
- Official portrait, 2008

Minister for Internal Affairs and Communications
- In office 12 June 2009 – 16 September 2009
- Prime Minister: Tarō Asō
- Preceded by: Kunio Hatoyama
- Succeeded by: Kazuhiro Haraguchi

Chairman of the National Public Safety Commission
- In office 24 September 2008 – 2 July 2009
- Prime Minister: Tarō Asō
- Preceded by: Motoo Hayashi
- Succeeded by: Motoo Hayashi

Member of the House of Representatives; from Northern Kanto
- In office 20 October 1996 – 23 January 2026
- Preceded by: Constituency established
- Succeeded by: Multi-member district
- Constituency: Tochigi 4th (1996–2009); PR block (2009–2012); Tochigi 4th (2012–2024); PR block (2024–2026)

Member of the Tochigi Prefectural Assembly
- In office 1987–1996
- Constituency: Northern Shimotsuga District

Personal details
- Born: 20 June 1952 (age 74) Shimotsuga, Tochigi, Japan
- Party: Liberal Democratic
- Education: Nihon University

Tsutomu Sato (佐藤 勉, Satō Tsutomu; born 20 June 1952) is a Japanese politician who served as Minister for Internal Affairs and Communications in 2009 and Chairman of the National Public Safety Commission from 2008 to 2009 under Prime Minister Taro Aso.

A member of the House of Representatives for the Liberal Democratic Party from 1996 to 2026, Sato has also served in party positions as chairman of the General Council from 2020 to 2021 and chairman of the Diet Affairs Committee from 2013 to 2016.

A native of Tochigi Prefecture and graduate of Nihon University, he worked as for a construction company and served in the Tochigi Prefectural Assembly before his election to the House of Representatives.

== Biography ==
Tsutomu Sato was born on 20 June 1952, in the Shimotsuga District of Tochigi Prefecture. He studied engineering at Nihon University and worked at Hazama Corporation after graduating in 1975. In 1987 he was elected to the Tochigi Prefectural Assembly.

Sato was elected as a LDP candidate for Tochigi 4th district in the October 1996 House of Representatives election. He served as parliamentary vice minister of Health, Labour and Welfare from 2001 to 2002, chairman of the House Committee on Internal Affairs and Communications from 2006 and senior vice minister for Internal Affairs and Communications in 2007.

In September 2008, he was appointed Sato was appointed as Chairman of the National Public Safety Commission and Minister of State for Okinawa and Northern Territories Affairs in the cabinet of Prime Minister Taro Aso. He was also appointed Minister Minister for Internal Affairs and Communications in June 2009 after Kunio Hatoyama resigned. Sato served in this and his previous positions concurrently until Motoo Hayashi was appointed to succeed him in the latter. He left cabinet as the LDP lost power in the 2009 election, but Sato retained a seat in the Diet.

The LDP returned to power in 2012, and Sato was appointed chairman of the Diet Affairs Committee in October 2013, when his predecessor Ichiro Kamoshita resigned for health reasons. He held the post until 2016. Sato served as chairman of the LDP General Council under Yoshihide Suga from 2020 to 2021.

Sato was appointed chief of the party treasury bureau in November 2024. He did not run for reelection in 2026 and retired.

Political offices
Preceded by Kunio Hatoyama	Minister for Internal Affairs and Communications; 2009	Succeeded by Kazuhiro Haraguchi
Preceded by Motoo Hayashi	Chairman of the National Public Safety Commission; 2008—2009	Succeeded by Motoo Hayashi
Party political offices
Preceded by Ichiro Kamoshita	Chairman of the Diet Affairs Committee, Liberal Democratic Party; 2013—2016	Succeeded by Wataru Takeshita
Preceded by Shun'ichi Suzuki	Chairman of the General Council, Liberal Democratic Party; 2020—2021	Succeeded by Tatsuo Fukuda
