= Minister for Internal Affairs and Communications =

Japanese cabinet role

- 総務大臣
- Emblem of the Government of Japan

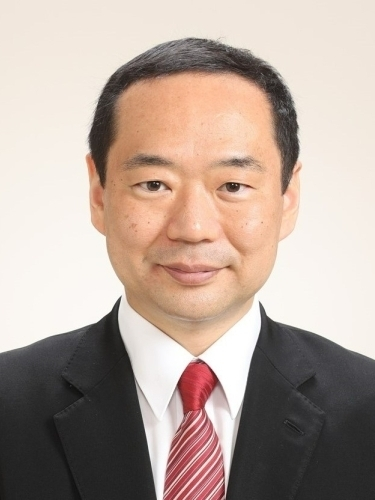
- Incumbent; Hisayuki Fujii since 17 September 2026
- Ministry of Internal Affairs and Communications
- Style: His Excellency
- Member of: Cabinet of Japan; National Security Council
- Reports to: Prime Minister of Japan
- Nominator: Prime Minister of Japan
- Appointer: Emperor of Japan; attested to by the Emperor
- Precursor: Minister of Posts and Telecommunications; Minister for Home Affairs; Director-General of the Internal Affairs and Communications Bureau
- Formation: January 6, 2001; 25 years ago
- Deputy: State Minister for Internal Affairs and Communications
- Salary: ¥20,916,000

The Minister for Internal Affairs and Communications (総務大臣, Soumu Daijin) is a member of the Cabinet of Japan and is the leader and chief executive of the Ministry of Internal Affairs and Communications. The minister is also a statutory member of the National Security Council, and is nominated by the Prime Minister of Japan and is appointed by the Emperor of Japan.

The current minister is Hisayuki Fujii, who took office on September 17, 2026.

== List of ministers for internal affairs and communications (2001–) ==
Liberal Democratic
Democratic
Independent

Internal Affairs Minister			Term of office			Prime Minister
#	Portrait	Name	Took office	Left office	Days	Prime Minister
1		Toranosuke Katayama	January 6, 2001	September 22, 2003	989	Yoshirō Mori
1		Toranosuke Katayama	January 6, 2001	September 22, 2003	989	Junichiro Koizumi
2		Taro Aso	September 22, 2003	October 31, 2005	770	Junichiro Koizumi
3		Heizō Takenaka	October 31, 2005	September 26, 2006	330	Junichiro Koizumi
4		Yoshihide Suga	September 26, 2006	August 27, 2007	335	Shinzō Abe
5		Hiroya Masuda	August 27, 2007	September 24, 2008	394	Shinzō Abe
5		Hiroya Masuda	August 27, 2007	September 24, 2008	394	Yasuo Fukuda
6		Kunio Hatoyama	September 24, 2008	June 12, 2009	261	Taro Aso
7		Tsutomu Sato	June 12, 2009	September 16, 2009	96	Taro Aso
8		Kazuhiro Haraguchi	September 16, 2009	September 17, 2010	366	Yukio Hatoyama
8		Kazuhiro Haraguchi	September 16, 2009	September 17, 2010	366	Naoto Kan
9		Yoshihiro Katayama	September 17, 2010	September 2, 2011	350	Naoto Kan
10		Tatsuo Kawabata	September 2, 2011	October 1, 2012	395	Yoshihiko Noda
11		Shinji Tarutoko	October 1, 2012	December 26, 2012	86	Yoshihiko Noda
12		Yoshitaka Shindō	December 26, 2012	September 3, 2014	616	Shinzō Abe
13		Sanae Takaichi	September 3, 2014	August 3, 2017	1065	Shinzō Abe
14		Seiko Noda	August 3, 2017	October 2, 2018	425	Shinzō Abe
15		Masatoshi Ishida	October 2, 2018	September 11, 2019	344	Shinzō Abe
16 (13)		Sanae Takaichi	September 11, 2019	September 16, 2020	371	Shinzō Abe
17		Ryota Takeda	September 16, 2020	October 4, 2021	383	Yoshihide Suga
18		Yasushi Kaneko	October 4, 2021	August 10, 2022	310	Fumio Kishida
19		Minoru Terada	August 10, 2022	November 20, 2022	102	Fumio Kishida
20		Takeaki Matsumoto	November 21, 2022	September 13, 2023	296	Fumio Kishida
21		Junji Suzuki	September 13, 2023	December 14, 2023	92	Fumio Kishida
22 (20)		Takeaki Matsumoto	December 14, 2023	October 1, 2024	292	Fumio Kishida
23		Seiichiro Murakami	October 1, 2024	October 21, 2025	385	Shigeru Ishiba
24		Yoshimasa Hayashi	October 21, 2025	September 17, 2026	331	Sanae Takaichi
25		Hisayuki Fujii	September 17, 2026	Incumbent	0	Sanae Takaichi
Reference: soumu.go.jp
