= Seijo =

Seijo is a surname and a given name; notable people called Seijo include:

Surname:

- Bibiana Campos Seijo, editor, publisher, and media executive
- Francisco Zayas Seijo (born 1951), former member of the Puerto Rico House of Representatives
- Jorge Seijo (born 1942), radio and television personality
- Luisa Seijo (born 1950), Puerto Rican academic, activist, and social worker

Given name:

- Seijo Inagawa (1914–2007), Japanese yakuza boss, founder of the Inagawa-kai
- José Seijo Rubio (born 1881), Spanish painter, exponent of the post-impressionist movement

== See also ==
- Seijo, Tokyo
- Seijo Gakuen Education Institute, educational institute that operates universities and schools in Japan
- Seijo Gakuen Junior High School and High School, private junior high and high school in Setagaya, Tokyo
- Lycée Seijo, Japanese boarding high school in Alsace region of France, near Colmar
- Seijo gakuen mae, railway station on the Odakyu Odawara Line in Setagaya, Tokyo, Japan
- Seijo University, private university in Seijo, Setagaya-ku, Tokyo, Japan
- Saijō (disambiguation)
- Seiji
- Siejo
