= List of prime ministers of Japan by education =

Universities attended by Japanese prime ministers
University	Number of prime ministers
University of Tokyo	17
Waseda University	7
Keio University	4
Kyoto University	2
Meiji University	2
Other university in Japan	11
University outside Japan	2
Military institution	12
No higher education	8

A bar chart of universities attended by Japanese prime ministers at the undergraduate level.

This is a list of prime ministers of Japan and the educational institutions they attended. As of October 2024, of the 66 prime ministers to date, 17 were educated at the University of Tokyo (called Tokyo Imperial University between 1897 and 1947), seven at Waseda University, six at the Imperial Japanese Naval Academy, five at the Imperial Japanese Army Academy, four at Keio University, two at Kyoto University and Meiji University, and one at 13 other institutions. 7 did not attend higher education.

Many prime ministers born and raised during the Edo period didn’t attend university, as there was no degree-awarding higher education at the time. Instead, education was predominantly provided by local temples and shrine priests through private systems such as the Shoheizaka Gakumonjo. Since around the Meiji Restoration, young samurai and heirs of noble families, often backed by the government or feudal lords, began attending universities abroad, such as Itō Hirobumi, who studied at University College London, and Saionji Kinmochi, who was born into a prominent kuge family and attended the University of Paris. The country’s first university, the University of Tokyo, was established in the 1870s. Since the 1920s, when early graduates of the university had risen through the ranks, most civilian prime ministers have been educated at universities in Japan.

== Table ==
Bold indicates institutions that are active as of April 2025.

University	No.	Prime ministers
**University of Tokyo**	17	Hara Takashi, Katō Takaaki, Wakatsuki Reijirō, Hamaguchi Osachi, Kōki Hirota, Hiranuma Kiichirō, Kijūrō Shidehara, Shigeru Yoshida, Tetsu Katayama, Hitoshi Ashida, Ichirō Hatoyama, Nobusuke Kishi, Eisaku Satō, Takeo Fukuda, Yasuhiro Nakasone, Kiichi Miyazawa and Yukio Hatoyama
**Waseda University**	7	Tanzan Ishibashi, Noboru Takeshita, Keizō Obuchi, Yoshirō Mori, Yasuo Fukuda, Yoshihiko Noda and Fumio Kishida
Imperial Japanese Naval Academy	6	Yamamoto Gonnohyōe, Katō Tomosaburō, Saitō Makoto, Keisuke Okada, Mitsumasa Yonai and Kantarō Suzuki
Imperial Japanese Army Academy	5	Tanaka Giichi, Senjūrō Hayashi, Nobuyuki Abe, Hideki Tojo and Kuniaki Koiso
**Keio University**	4	Inukai Tsuyoshi, Ryutaro Hashimoto, Junichiro Koizumi and Shigeru Ishiba
**Kyoto University**	2	Fumimaro Konoe and Hayato Ikeda
**Meiji University**	2	Takeo Miki and Tomiichi Murayama
**Sophia University**	1	Morihiro Hosokawa
**Gakushuin University**	1	Tarō Asō
**Chuo University**	1	Toshiki Kaifu
**Hosei University**	1	Yoshihide Suga
**Hitotsubashi University**	1	Masayoshi Ōhira
**Kobe University**	1	**Sanae Takaichi (incumbent)**
**Shiga University**	1	Sōsuke Uno
**Tokyo Institute of Technology**	1	Naoto Kan
**Seikei University**	1	Shinzo Abe
**Seijo University**	1	Tsutomu Hata
**Tokyo University of Marine Science and Technology**	1	Zenkō Suzuki
**Chuo College of Technology**	1	Kakuei Tanaka
Army War College	1	Prince Naruhiko Higashikuni
**University College London**	1	Itō Hirobumi
University of Paris	1	Saionji Kinmochi
Army Toyama School	1	Terauchi Masatake
Did not attend higher education	7	Kuroda Kiyotaka, Yamagata Aritomo, Matsukata Masayoshi, Ōkuma Shigenobu, Katsura Tarō, Takahashi Korekiyo and Kiyoura Keigo

== List ==
Prime Minister	Term of office	School	University	Degree	Additional education
Itō Hirobumi	1885–1888; 1892–1896; 1898; 1900–1901	Shōkasonjuku Academy	University College London	—	
Kuroda Kiyotaka	1888–1889	Jigen-ryū	—	—	
Yamagata Aritomo	1889–1891; 1898–1900	Shōkasonjuku Academy	—	—	
Matsukata Masayoshi	1891–1892; 1896–1898	Zoshikan	—	—	
Ōkuma Shigenobu	1898; 1914–1916	Kōdōkan	—	—	
Katsura Tarō	1901–1906; 1908–1911; 1912–1913	—	—	—	
Saionji Kinmochi	1906–1908; 1911–1912	—	University of Paris	Law	
Yamamoto Gonnohyōe	1913–1914; 1923–1924	—	Imperial Japanese Naval Academy	—	
Terauchi Masatake	1916–1918	—	Army Toyama School	—	
Hara Takashi	1918–1921	Marin Seminary	Tokyo Imperial University	Did not graduate	
Takahashi Korekiyo	1921–1922	—	—	—	
Katō Tomosaburō	1922–1923	—	Imperial Japanese Naval Academy	—	
Kiyoura Keigo	1924	Kangi-en	—	—	
Katō Takaaki	1924–1926	Nagoya Western School	Tokyo Imperial University	English law	
Wakatsuki Reijirō	1926–1927; 1931	Shimane Prefectural Matsue Kita High School	Tokyo Imperial University	Law	
Tanaka Giichi	1927–1929	—	Imperial Japanese Army Academy	—	Army War College
Hamaguchi Osachi	1929–1930; 1931	Third Higher School	Tokyo Imperial University	Law	
Inukai Tsuyoshi	1931–1932	—	Keio University	Sinology	
Saitō Makoto	1932–1934	—	Imperial Japanese Naval Academy	—	
Keisuke Okada	1934–1936	Imperial Japanese Army Academy	Imperial Japanese Naval Academy	—	
Kōki Hirota	1936–1937	First Higher School	Tokyo Imperial University	Law	
Senjūrō Hayashi	1937	Fourth Higher School	Imperial Japanese Army Academy	—	Army War College
Fumimaro Konoe	1937–1939; 1940–1941	First Higher School	Kyoto Imperial University	Marxian economics	
Hiranuma Kiichirō	1939	First Higher School	Tokyo Imperial University	English law	
Nobuyuki Abe	1939–1940	Tokyo First Middle School	Imperial Japanese Army Academy	—	Army War College
Mitsumasa Yonai	1940	Morioka Middle School	Imperial Japanese Naval Academy	—	
Hideki Tojo	1941–1944	Army Central Children's School	Imperial Japanese Army Academy	—	Army War College
Kuniaki Koiso	1944–1945	Yamagata Middle School	Imperial Japanese Army Academy	—	
Kantarō Suzuki	1945	Kogyokusha Junior & Senior High School	Imperial Japanese Naval Academy	—	
Prince Naruhiko Higashikuni	1945	Gakushūin	Army War College	—	
Kijūrō Shidehara	1945–1946	Third Higher School	Tokyo Imperial University	Law	
Shigeru Yoshida	1946–1947; 1948–1954	Tokyo Physics School	Tokyo Imperial University	Law	
Tetsu Katayama	1947–1948	Third Higher School	Tokyo Imperial University	Law	
Hitoshi Ashida	1948	First Higher School	Tokyo Imperial University	Law	
Ichirō Hatoyama	1954–1956	First Higher School	Tokyo Imperial University	English law	
Tanzan Ishibashi	1956–1957	Waseda University Junior and Senior High School	Waseda University	Literature	
Nobusuke Kishi	1957–1960	First Higher School	Tokyo Imperial University	German law	
Hayato Ikeda	1960–1964	Fifth Higher School	Kyoto Imperial University	Law	
Eisaku Satō	1964–1972	Fifth Higher School	Tokyo Imperial University	Law	
Kakuei Tanaka	1972–1974	Kinjo Gakuen High School	Chuo College of Technology	Civil engineering	
Takeo Miki	1974–1976	Tokushima Prefectural Commercial School	Meiji University	Law	
Takeo Fukuda	1976–1978	First Higher School	Tokyo Imperial University	Law	
Masayoshi Ōhira	1978–1980	Takamatsu High School of Commerce	Tokyo University of Commerce	Economics	
Zenkō Suzuki	1980–1982	Iwate Prefectural Fisheries School	Tokyo University of Fisheries	—	
Yasuhiro Nakasone	1982–1987	Shizuoka Higher School	Tokyo Imperial University	Law	
Noboru Takeshita	1987–1989	Waseda University Junior and Senior High School	Waseda University	Economics	
Sōsuke Uno	1989	Shiga Prefectural Yawata Commercial School	Hikone Commercial College	Economics	
Toshiki Kaifu	1989–1991	Tokai Junior High School	Chuo University	Law	Waseda University
Kiichi Miyazawa	1991–1993	Musashi Higher School	Tokyo Imperial University	Law	
Morihiro Hosokawa	1993–1994	Gakushūin	Sophia University	Law	
Tsutomu Hata	1994	Seijo Academy High School	Seijo University	Economics	
Tomiichi Murayama	1994–1996	Oita Municipal High School	Meiji University	Political science	
Ryutaro Hashimoto	1996–1998	Azabu High School	Keio University	Law	
Keizō Obuchi	1998–2000	Tokyo Metropolitan Kita High School	Waseda University	Political science	
Yoshirō Mori	2000–2001	Kanazawa Nisui High School	Waseda University	Economics	
Junichiro Koizumi	2001–2006	Yokosuka High School	Keio University	Economics	University College London
Shinzo Abe	2006–2007; 2012–2020	Seikei Senior High School	Seikei University	Political science	University of Southern California (dropped out)
Yasuo Fukuda	2007–2008	Azabu High School	Waseda University	Economics	
Tarō Asō	2008–2009	Gakushūin	Gakushuin University	Political science	Stanford University (dropped out); London School of Economics
Yukio Hatoyama	2009–2010	Tokyo Metropolitan Koishikawa High School	University of Tokyo	Engineering	Stanford University
Naoto Kan	2010–2011	Tokyo Metropolitan Koyamadai High School	Tokyo Institute of Technology	Science	
Yoshihiko Noda	2011–2012	Chiba Prefectural Funabashi Senior High School	Waseda University	Political science	
Yoshihide Suga	2020–2021	Akita Prefectural Yuzawa High School	Hosei University	Law	
Fumio Kishida	2021–2024	Kaisei Academy	Waseda University	Law	
Shigeru Ishiba	2024–2025	Keio Senior High School	Keio University	Law	
Sanae Takaichi	2025–present	Nara Prefectural Unebi High School	Kobe University	Business	
Prime Minister	Term of office	School	University	Degree	Additional education

== See also ==
- List of prime ministers of Japan
- List of prime ministers of Japan by time in office
- List of prime ministers of Japan by home prefecture
