= Choji Murata =

Japanese baseball player (1949–2022)

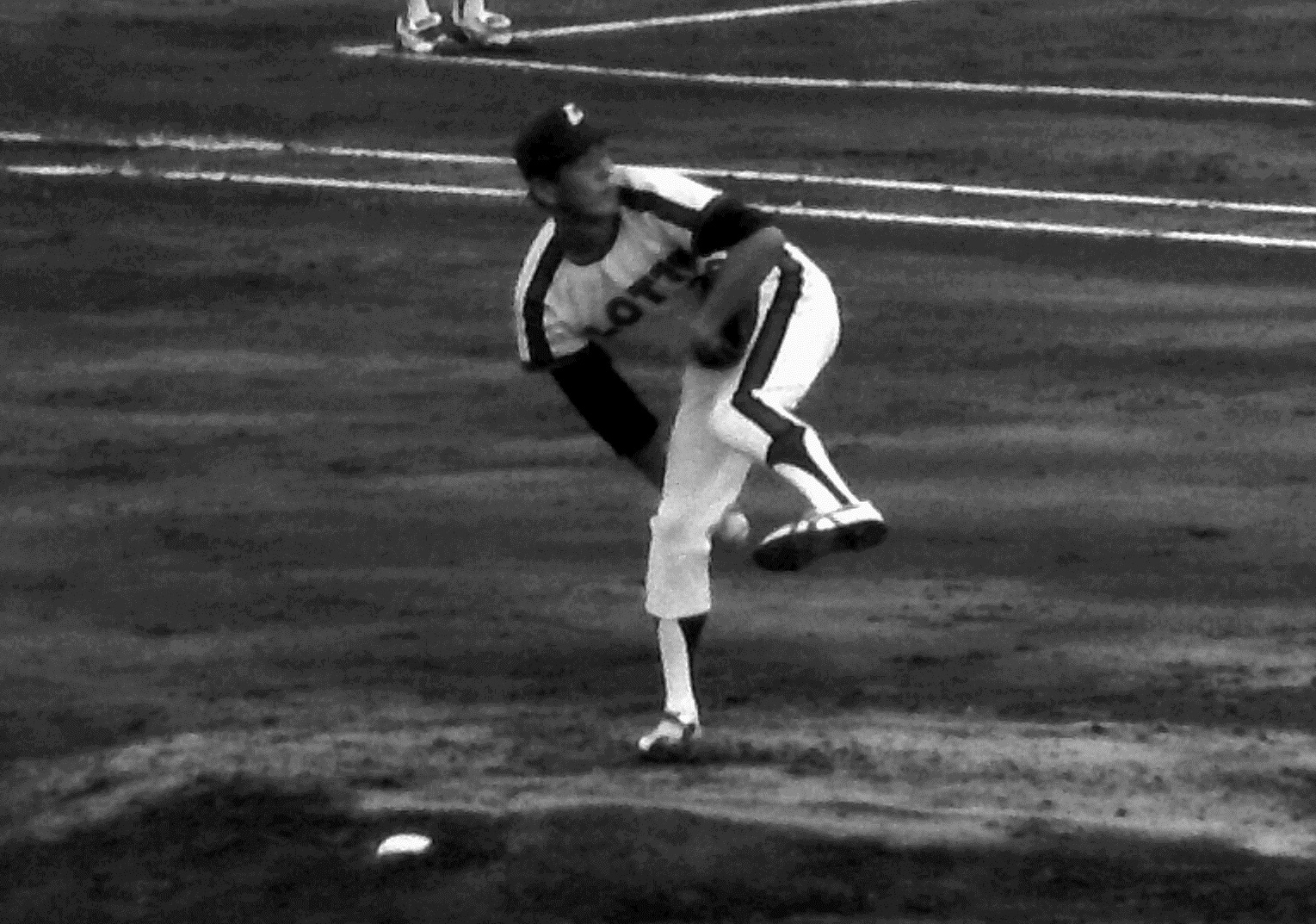
- Murata in 1990
- Pitcher
- Born: 27 November 1949; Toyota District, Hiroshima, Japan
- Died: 11 November 2022 (aged 72); Setagaya, Tokyo, Japan
- Batted: Right Threw: Right

NPB debut
- 1968, for the Tokyo Orions

Last NPB appearance
- 1990, for the Lotte Orions

NPB statistics
- Win–loss: 215–177
- Earned run average: 3.24
- Shutouts: 36
- Innings pitched: 3,331.1
- Strikeouts: 2,363
- Stats at Baseball Reference

Teams
- As player: Tokyo Orions/Lotte Orions (1968–1990); As coach: Fukuoka Daiei Hawks (1995–1997)

Career highlights and awards
- Japan Series champion (1974); 3x ERA champion

Member of the Japanese

Baseball Hall of Fame
- Induction: 2005

Choji Murata (村田 兆治, 27 November 1949 – 11 November 2022) was a Japanese Nippon Professional Baseball pitcher. He played for the Tokyo/Lotte Orions over the period 1968 to 1990.

Murata led the Pacific League in Earned run average in 1975 and 1976. In 1976 he won 21 games, the only time he won 20 games or more in his career.

Overuse of Murata's pitching arm led to extreme pain and injury, and ultimately Murata was forced to undergo Tommy John elbow surgery, performed in 1982 by Dr. Frank Jobe in California. (Murata was the first Japanese pitcher to undergo the procedure.) As a result, Murata missed much of the 1982 season, all of the 1983 season, and most of the 1984 season during his recovery.

Rebounding in 1985 with a 17–5 record, Murata won the Nippon Professional Baseball Comeback Player of the Year Award. In 1989 he again led the Pacific League in ERA.

Retiring in 1990 with 200+ career wins, Murata became a member of Meikyukai. He was inducted into the Japanese Baseball Hall of Fame in 2005.

In 2008, Murata served on the Eiji Sawamura Award selection committee.

On 23 September 2022, Murata was arrested at Haneda airport for allegedly assaulting a customs agent.

On 11 November 2022, Murata's house in Seijo, Setagaya, Tokyo, caught on fire during the early morning. Subsequently, he was taken to a hospital where he was pronounced dead due to carbon monoxide poisoning at age 72.

== See also ==
- List of top Nippon Professional Baseball strikeout pitchers
