= List of prime ministers of Japan by home prefecture =

This is a list of prime ministers of Japan by home prefecture. This is based on prefectures where each prime minister was born, and not based on prefectures primarily affiliated or most closely associated with the prime ministers due to residence, professional career, or electoral history.

This list includes provinces, the former administrative divisions used from the 600s to 1882.

== Birthplaces ==
Twelve provinces and twenty-one prefectures, including 1 metropolis (Tokyo) have the distinction of being the birthplace of a prime minister.

Born on 1 April 1870, Hamaguchi Osachi was the first prime minister born after the establishment of the Empire of Japan.

Born on 21 September 1954, Shinzo Abe was the first prime minister born after the establishment of the post-war state of Japan.

The number of prime ministers per provinces and prefectures in which they were born are:

- One: Akita Prefecture, Chiba Prefecture, Okayama Prefecture, Ōita Prefecture, Hiroshima Prefecture, Aichi Prefecture, Shiga Prefecture, Shimane Prefecture, Kagawa Prefecture, Tokushima Prefecture, Nara Prefecture, Niigata Prefecture, Kyoto Prefecture, Tochigi Prefecture, Ishikawa Prefecture, Izumi Province, Mimasaka Province, Echizen Province, Bitchū Province, Nara Province, Tosa Province, Izumo Province, Owari Province, Higo Province, Aki Province, Musashi Province, Yamashiro Province, Hizen Province, Suō Province
- Two: Yamaguchi Prefecture, Fukuoka Prefecture, Ishikawa Prefecture, Iwate Prefecture, Mutsu Province
- Three: Satsuma Province
- Four: Tokyo (Metropolis), Gunma Prefecture, Kanagawa Prefecture, Nagato Province
- Eight: Tokyo (Prefecture)

| Date of birth | Prime Minister | Birthplace | Prefecture (Note: Includes Provinces which were the administrative divisions of Japan until 1882.) of birth | In office |
|---|---|---|---|---|
| 16 October 1841 | Itō Hirobumi | Tsukari | Suō Province | 22 December 1885 – 30 April 1888; 8 August 1892 – 31 August 1896; 12 January – 30 June 1898; 19 October 1900 – 10 May 1901 |
| 9 November 1840 | Kuroda Kiyotaka | Kagoshima | Satsuma Province | 30 April 1888 – 25 October 1889 |
| 14 June 1838 | Yamagata Aritomo | Kawashima | Nagato Province | 24 December 1889 – 6 May 1891; 8 November 1898 – 19 October 1900 |
| 25 February 1835 | Matsukata Masayoshi | Kagoshima | Satsuma Province | 6 May 1891 – 8 August 1892; 18 September 1896 – 12 January 1898 |
| 11 March 1838 | Ōkuma Shigenobu | Saga | Hizen Province | June 30, – November 8, 1898; April 16, 1914 – October 9, 1916 |
| 4 January 1848 | Katsura Tarō | Hagi | Nagato Province | 2 June 1901 – 7 January 1906; 14 July 1908 – 30 August 1911; 21 December 1912 – 20 February 1913 |
| 7 December 1849 | Saionji Kinmochi | Kyoto | Yamashiro Province | 7 January 1906 – 14 July 1908; 30 August 1911 – 21 December 1912 |
| 26 November 1852 | Yamamoto Gonnohyōe | Kagoshima | Satsuma Province | 20 February 1913 – 16 April 1914; 2 September 1923 – 7 January 1924 |
| 5 February 1852 | Terauchi Masatake | Yamaguchi | Nagato Province | 9 October 1916 – 29 September 1918 |
| 15 March 1856 | Hara Takashi | Motomiya | Mutsu Province | 29 September 1918 – 4 November 1921 |
| 27 July 1854 | Takahashi Korekiyo | Edo | Musashi Province | 13 November 1921 – 12 June 1922 |
| 22 February 1861 | Katō Tomosaburō | Hiroshima | Aki Province | 12 June 1922 – 24 August 1923 |
| 14 February or 27 March 1850 | Kiyoura Keigo | Kamoto | Higo Province | 7 January – 11 June 1924 |
| 3 January 1860 | Katō Takaaki | Aisai | Owari Province | 11 June 1924 – 28 January 1926 |
| 21 March 1866 | Wakatsuki Reijirō | Matsue | Izumo Province | 28 January 1926 – 20 April 1927; 14 April 1931 – 13 December 1931 |
| 22 June 1864 | Tanaka Giichi | Hagi | Nagato Province | 20 April 1927 – 2 July 1929 |
| 1 April 1870 | Hamaguchi Osachi | Kōchi | Tosa Province | 2 July 1929 – 14 November 1930; 10 March – 14 April 1931 |
| 4 June 1855 | Inukai Tsuyoshi | Okayama | Bitchū Province | 13 December 1931 – 15 May 1932 |
| 27 October 1858 | Saitō Makoto | Mizusawa | Mutsu Province | 26 May 1932 – 8 July 1934 |
| 20 January 1868 | Keisuke Okada | Fukui | Echizen Province | 8 July 1934 – 9 March 1936 |
| 14 February 1878 | Kōki Hirota | Fukuoka | Fukuoka | 9 March 1936 – 2 February 1937 |
| 23 February 1876 | Senjūrō Hayashi | Tokyo City | Tokyo Prefecture | 2 February – 4 June 1937 |
| 12 October 1891 | Fumimaro Konoe | Tokyo City | Tokyo Prefecture | 4 June 1937 – 5 January 1939; 22 July 1940 – 18 October 1941 |
| 28 September 1867 | Hiranuma Kiichirō | Tsuyama | Mimasaka Province | 5 January – 30 August 1939 |
| 24 November 1875 | Nobuyuki Abe | Kanazawa | Ishikawa | 30 August 1939 – 16 January 1940 |
| 2 March 1880 | Mitsumasa Yonai | Mitsuwari | Iwate | 16 January – 22 July 1940 |
| 30 December 1884 | Hideki Tojo | Tokyo City | Tokyo Prefecture | 18 October 1941 – 22 July 1944 |
| 22 March 1880 | Kuniaki Koiso | Utsunomiya | Tochigi | 22 July 1944 – 7 April 1945 |
| 18 January 1868 | Kantarō Suzuki | Kuze | Izumi Province | 7 April – 17 August 1945 |
| 3 December 1887 | Prince Naruhiko Higashikuni | Kyoto | Kyoto | 17 August – 9 October 1945 |
| 13 September 1872 | Kijūrō Shidehara | Sakai | Nara Province | 14 November 1930 – 10 March 1931; 9 October 1945 – 22 May 1946 |
| 22 September 1878 | Shigeru Yoshida | Yokosuka | Kanagawa | 22 May 1946 – 24 May 1947; 15 October 1948 – 10 December 1954 |
| 28 July 1887 | Tetsu Katayama | Fujisawa | Kanagawa | 24 May 1947 – 10 March 1948 |
| 15 November 1887 | Hitoshi Ashida | Tokyo City | Tokyo Prefecture | 10 March 1948 – 15 October 1948 |
| 1 January 1883 | Ichirō Hatoyama | Tokyo City | Tokyo Prefecture | 10 December 1954 – 23 December 1956 |
| 25 September 1884 | Tanzan Ishibashi | Tokyo City | Tokyo Prefecture | 23 December 1956 – 31 January 1957 |
| 13 November 1896 | Nobusuke Kishi | Yamaguchi | Yamaguchi | 31 January 1957 – 19 July 1960 |
| 3 December 1899 | Hayato Ikeda | Takehara | Hiroshima | 19 July 1960 – 9 November 1964 |
| 27 March 1901 | Eisaku Satō | Tabuse | Yamaguchi | 9 November 1964 – 7 July 1972 |
| 4 May 1918 | Kakuei Tanaka | Nishiyama | Niigata | 7 July 1972 – 9 December 1974 |
| 17 March 1907 | Takeo Miki | Awa | Tokushima | 9 December 1974 – 24 December 1976 |
| 14 January 1905 | Takeo Fukuda | Takasaki | Gunma | 24 December 1976 – 7 December 1978 |
| 12 March 1910 | Masayoshi Ōhira | Kan'onji | Kagawa | 7 December 1978 – 12 June 1980 |
| 11 January 1911 | Zenko Suzuki | Yamada | Iwate | 17 July 1980 – 27 November 1982 |
| 27 May 1918 | Yasuhiro Nakasone | Takasaki | Gunma | 27 November 1982 – 6 November 1987 |
| 26 February 1924 | Noboru Takeshita | Unnan | Shimane | 6 November 1987 – 3 June 1989 |
| 27 August 1922 | Sōsuke Uno | Moriyama | Shiga | 3 June 1989 – 10 August 1989 |
| 2 January 1931 | Toshiki Kaifu | Nagoya | Aichi | 10 August 1989 – 5 November 1991 |
| 8 October 1919 | Kiichi Miyazawa | Fukuyama | Hiroshima | 5 November 1991 – 9 August 1993 |
| 14 January 1938 | Morihiro Hosokawa | Tokyo City | Tokyo Prefecture | 9 August 1993 – 28 April 1994 |
| 24 August 1935 | Tsutomu Hata | Tokyo City | Tokyo Prefecture | 28 April 1994 – 30 June 1994 |
| 3 March 1924 | Tomiichi Murayama | Ōita | Ōita | 30 July 1994 – 11 January 1996 |
| 29 July 1937 | Ryutaro Hashimoto | Sōja | Okayama | 11 January 1996 – 30 July 1998 |
| 25 June 1937 | Keizō Obuchi | Nakanojō | Gunma | 30 July 1998 – 5 April 2000 |
| 14 July 1937 | Yoshirō Mori | Nomi | Ishikawa | 5 April 2000 – 26 April 2001 |
| 8 January 1942 | Junichiro Koizumi | Yokosuka | Kanagawa | 26 April 2001 – 26 September 2006 |
| 21 September 1954 | Shinzo Abe | Shinjuku | Tokyo | 26 September 2006 – 26 September 2007; 26 December 2012 – 16 September 2020 |
| 16 July 1936 | Yasuo Fukuda | Takasaki | Gunma | 26 September 2007 – 24 September 2008 |
| 20 September 1940 | Tarō Asō | Iizuka | Fukuoka | 24 September 2008 – 16 September 2009 |
| 11 February 1947 | Yukio Hatoyama | Bunkyō | Tokyo | 16 September 2009 – 8 June 2010 |
| 10 October 1946 | Naoto Kan | Ube | Yamaguchi | 8 June 2010 – 2 September 2011 |
| 20 May 1957 | Yoshihiko Noda | Funabashi | Chiba | 2 September 2011 – 26 December 2012 |
| 6 December 1948 | Yoshihide Suga | Yuzawa | Akita | 16 September 2020 – 4 October 2021 |
| 29 July 1957 | Fumio Kishida | Shibuya | Tokyo | 4 October 2021 – 1 October 2024 |
| 4 February 1957 | Shigeru Ishiba | Chiyoda | Tokyo | 1 October 2024 – 21 October 2025 |
| 7 March 1961 | Sanae Takaichi | Yamatokōriyama | Nara | 21 October 2025 – Present |

== See also ==
- List of prime ministers of Japan
- List of prime ministers of Japan by time in office
- List of prime ministers of Japan by education
