= Seijo Gakuen Junior High School and High School =

Coordinates: 35°38′44″N 139°36′02″E

Information
- Type: Private
- Established: 1950
- Founder: Seijo Gakuen
- Gender: Coeducational
- Enrollment: 1500+
- Campus type: Suburban
- Color(s): Blue
- Website: www.seijogakuen.ed.jp/chukou/index.html

Seijo Gakuen Junior High School and High School (成城学園中学校高等学校, Seijō Gakuen Chūgakkō Kōtōgakkō) is a private junior high and high school in Setagaya, Tokyo, operated by the Seijo Gakuen institute.

== History ==
The present-day junior high school and high school traces its lineage to the Seijo Elementary School, the founding entity of the present-day Seijo Gakuen. The Seijo Junior High School and separate Senior High Schools for boys and girls were established during the 1920s. Following the 1949 education reforms, the system was restructured and the coeducational Seijo Gakuen Junior High School and High School was opened in 1950 while the tertiary education provision became a junior college, later obtaining university status.

== Traditions ==
The school has a practice unique to Japanese schools which stems from its legacy as separate boys' and girls' high schools. The former girls' school did not have a prescribed uniform, a tradition which continues to this day, although they do have to abide by a general dress code. Boys continue to wear the blazer and slacks.

== Notable alumni ==
=== Politicians ===
- Yūko Obuchi
- Takao Fujii
- Yasuhide Nakayama
- Yuichiro Hata
- Tsutomu Hata
- Yoko Komiyama
- Kōki Ishii

=== Writers ===
- Shōhei Ōoka
- Kōbō Abe

=== Conductors ===
- Seiji Ozawa
- Michiyoshi Inoue
- Yuki Ito

=== Singers ===
- Ryoko Moriyama
- Naotarō Moriyama
- Hiromi Iwasaki
- Yoshimi Iwasaki
- Yutaro Miura
- Kikuchi Fuma
- Hiroki Maekawa

=== Actors ===
- Masakazu Tamura
- Ryō Tamura
- Ken Ishiguro
- Masanobu Takashima
- Masahiro Takashima
- Yukiyoshi Ozawa
- Mitsuhiro Oikawa
- Takahiro Miura
- Mayu Tsuruta
- Yuko Ito
- Yoshino Kimura
- Haruna Ikezawa (Voice Actor)

=== Tarento ===
- Moe Yamaguchi
- Tomu Muto
- Marino Miyata

=== Filmmakers ===
- Kenta Fukasaku
- Kazuko Kurosawa

=== Athletes ===
- Yuji Matsuo
- Yuki Ishikawa
- Shoko Yoshimura

=== Others ===
- Shu Uemura, Makeup Artist

== See also ==
- Seijo University
- Lycée Seijo
