= Seijō =

Neighborhood in Tokyo, Japan

Seijō (成城) is a Tokyo suburban neighborhood in Setagaya named after Seijo Gakuen (成城学園), a school founded in 1917 by Masataro Sawayanagi, a former minister of education in the pre–World War II education system. The area is also known for Seijo University. Seijōgakuen-mae Station serves the area.

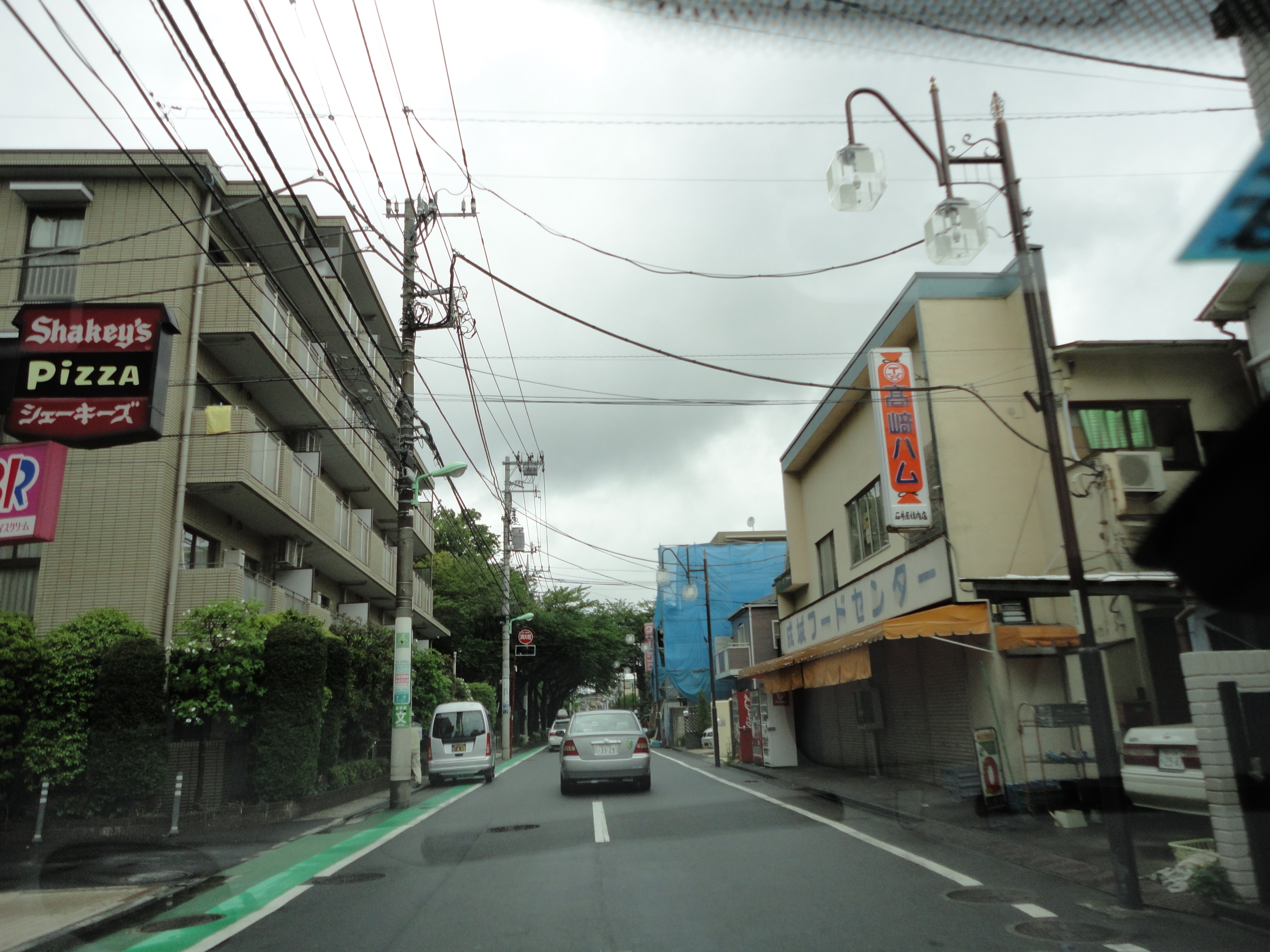
Seijo Street (成城通り)

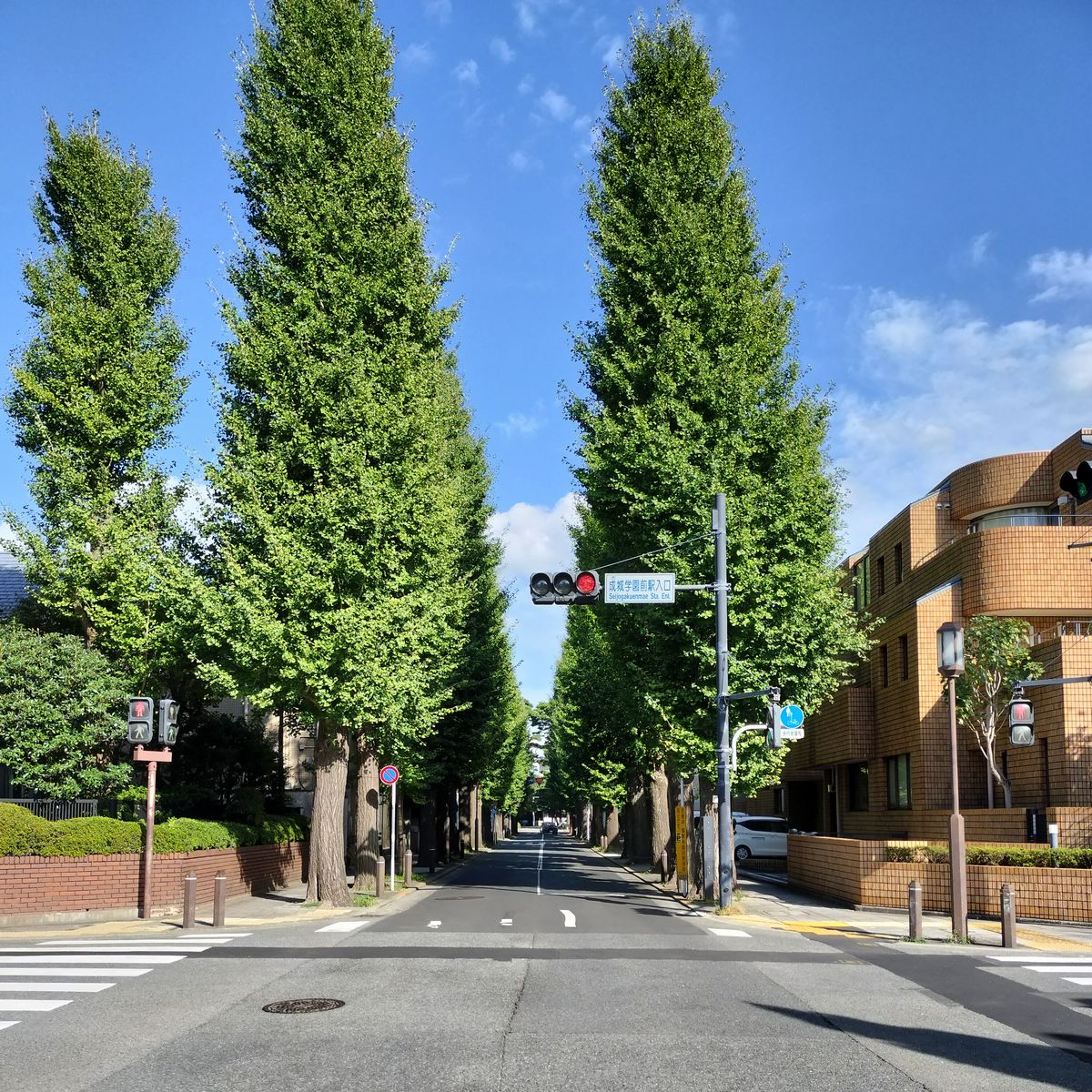
Tree-lined street in front of Seijo University's main gate

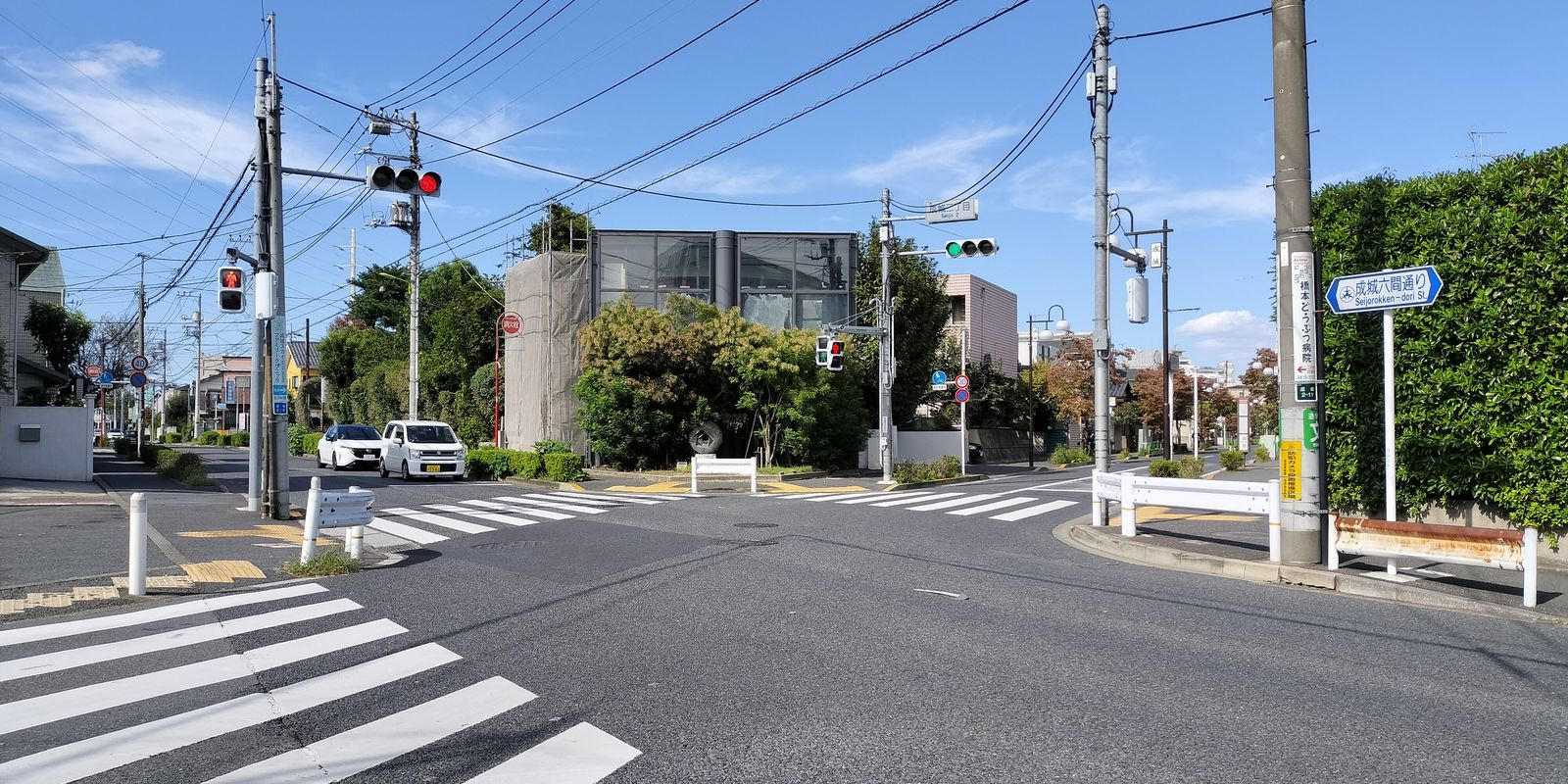
Intersection of Seijo Street and Seijo Rokken Street

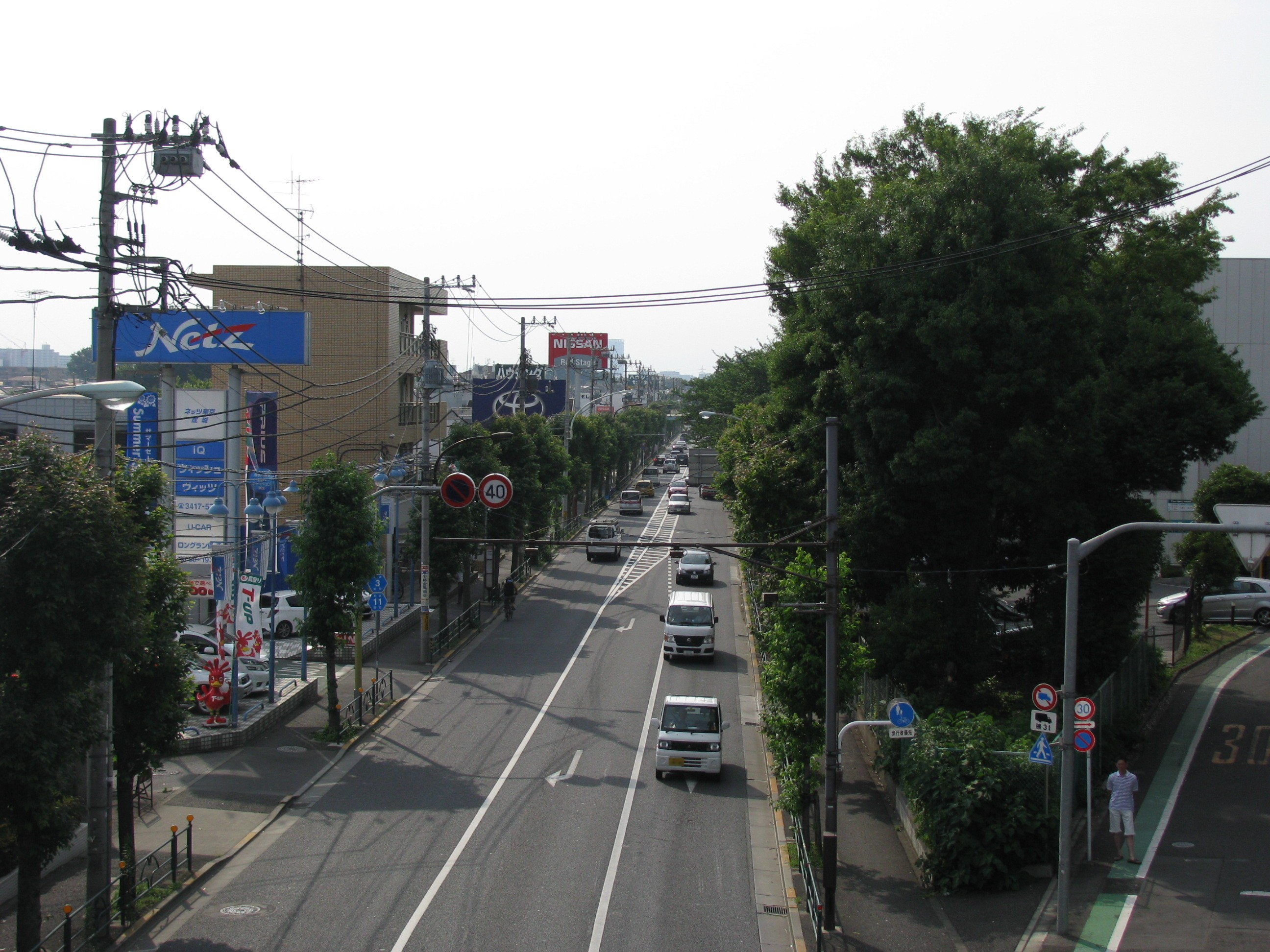
Along the Nogawa River on Setagaya Street (世田谷通り)

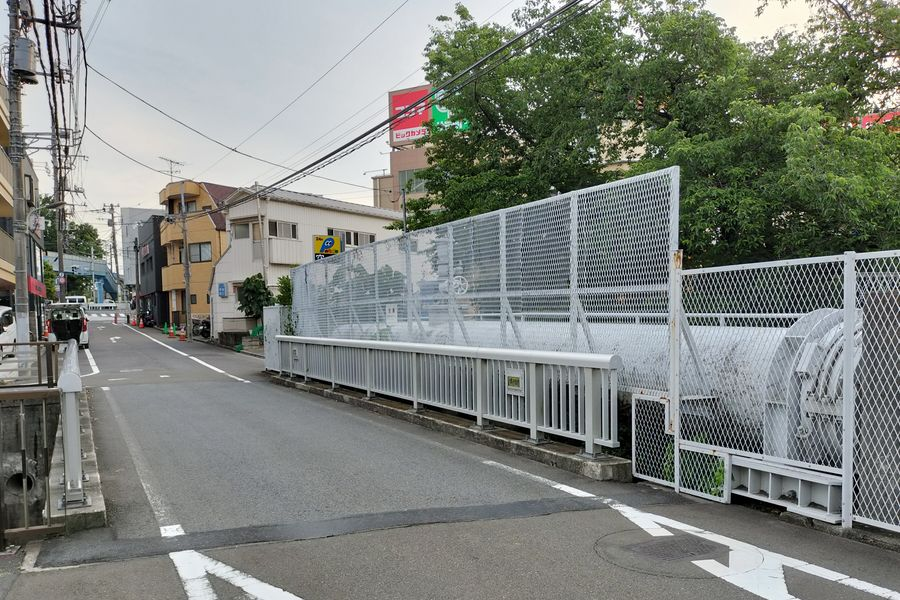
Aratama Waterworks Road

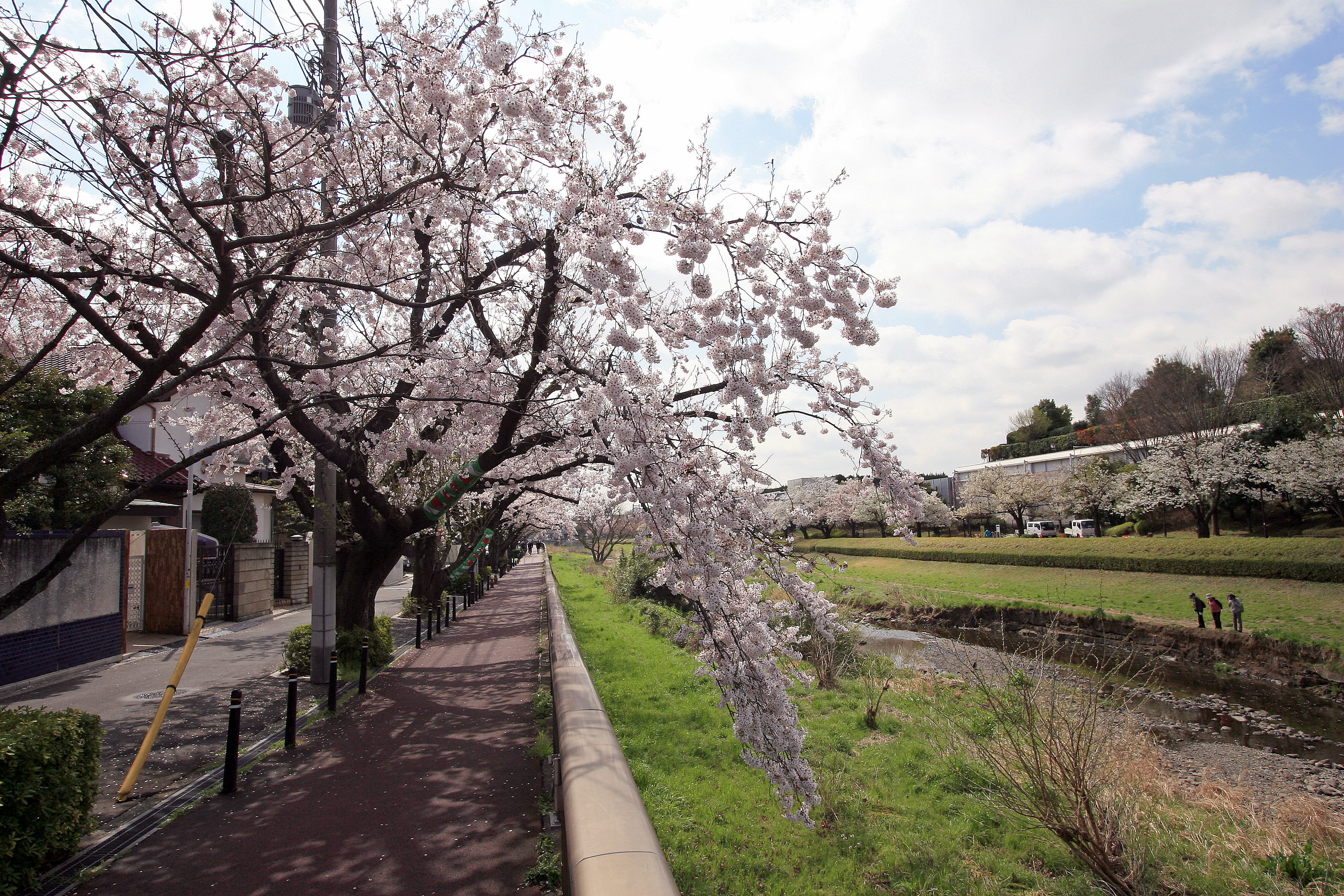
Promenade along the Nogawa River (野川)

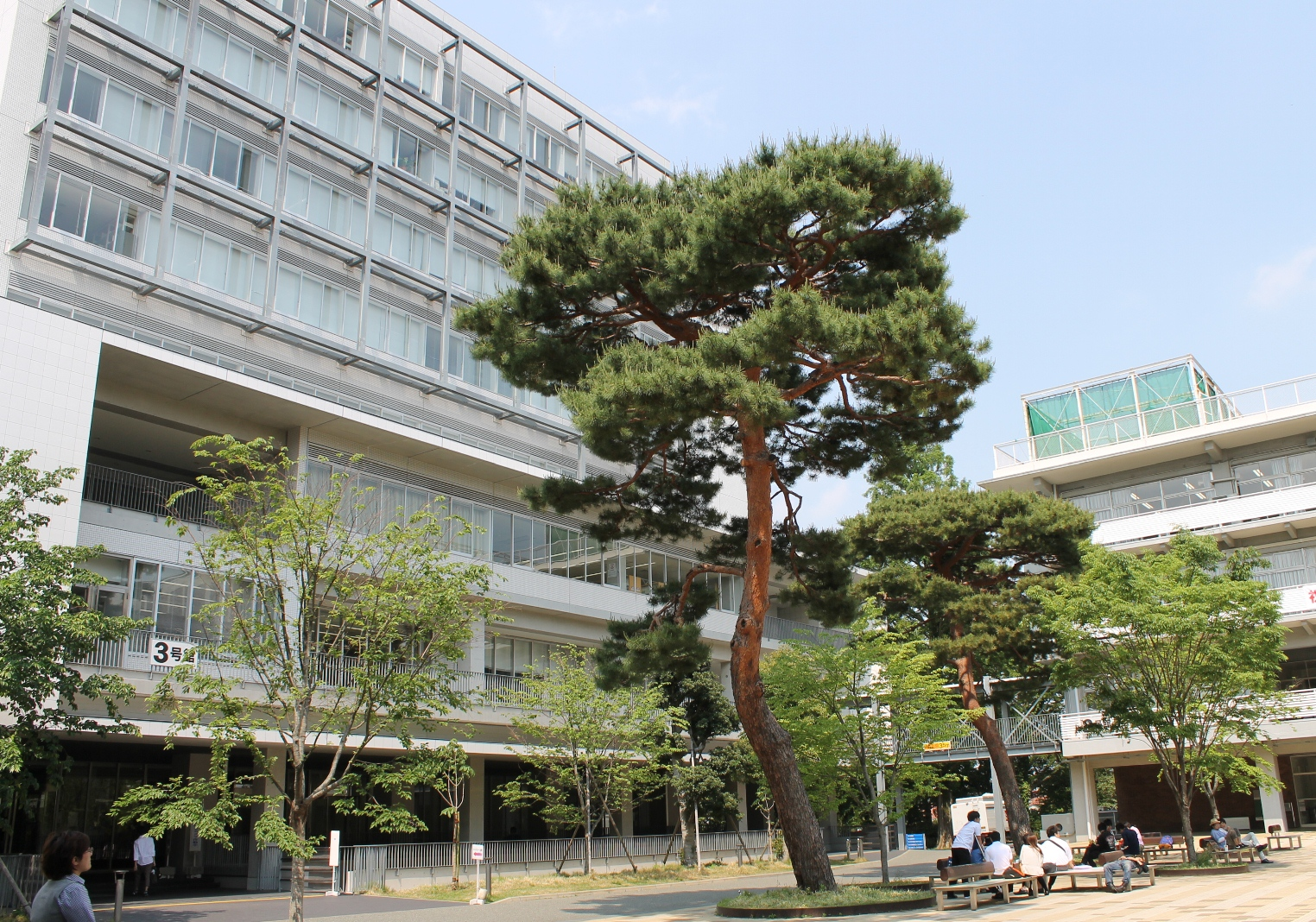
Seijo University
