= Mitsuyoshi Yanagisawa =

Japanese politician

- 柳澤 光美
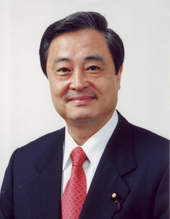
- Official portrait, 2011

Member of the House of Councillors
- In office 26 July 2004 – 25 July 2016
- Constituency: National PR

Personal details
- Born: 5 May 1948 (age 78) Tōmi, Nagano, Japan
- Party: Democratic
- Other political affiliations: DP (2016)
- Education: Seijo University

Mitsuyoshi Yanagisawa (柳沢 光美, Yanagisawa Mitsuyoshi; born May 5, 1948) is a Japanese politician of the Democratic Party of Japan, a member of the House of Councillors in the Diet (national legislature). A native of Tōmi, Nagano and graduate of Seijo University, he was elected to the House of Councillors for the first time in 2004 after an unsuccessful run in 2001.

House of Councillors
Preceded by Tsunenori Kawai	Chair, Cabinet Affairs Committee of the House of Councillors of Japan; 2010	Succeeded by Koji Matsui
Preceded by Masashi Fujiwara	Chair, Economy, Trade and Industry Committee of the House of Councillors of Japan; 2010–2011	Succeeded by Kiyoshige Maekawa
Political offices
Preceded by Seishu Makino, Tadahiro Matsushita	Senior Vice Minister of Economy, Trade and Industry; 2012; Served alongside: Seishu Makino	Succeeded by Yōsuke Kondō, Isao Matsumiya
