= List of prime ministers of Japan by time in office =

This is a list of prime ministers of Japan by time in office.

== Notable lengths ==
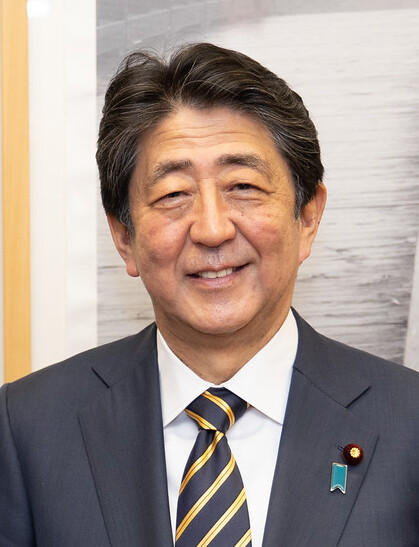
8 years and 267 days: Shinzo Abe
(2006–2007 and 2012–2020)
Longest total tenure

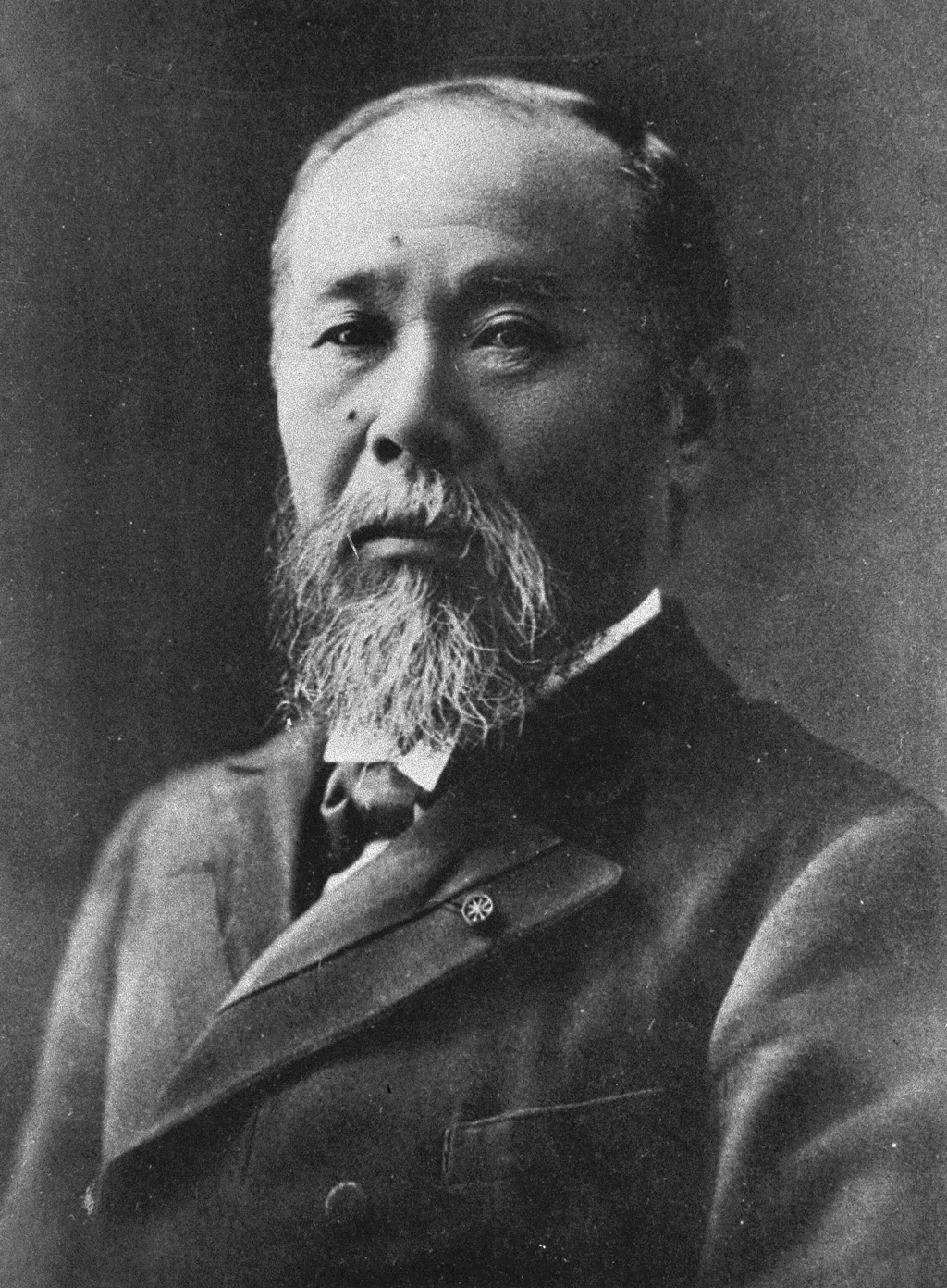
7 years and 164 days: Itō Hirobumi
(1885–1888, 1892–1896, 1898, and 1900–1901)
Most non-consecutive terms

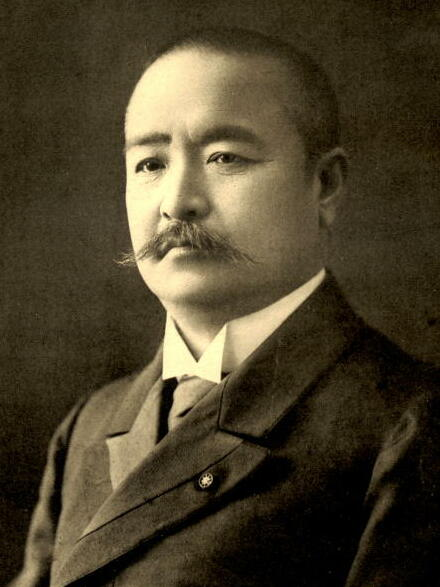
7 years and 330 days: Katsura Tarō
(1901–1906, 1908–1911, and 1912–1913)
Longest-serving prime minister in the 20th century

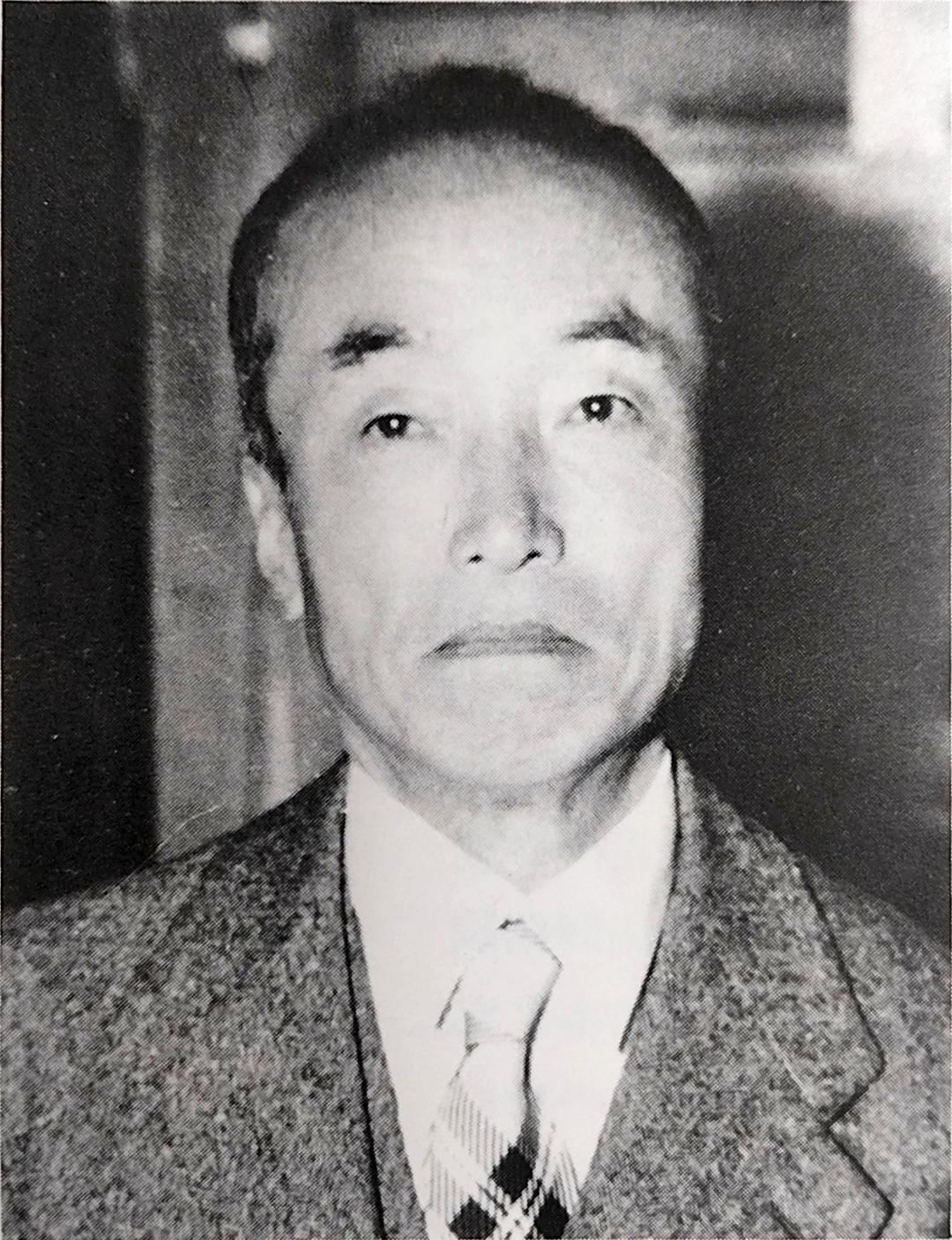
54 days: Prince Naruhiko Higashikuni
(1945)
Shortest-serving prime minister

Of the 65 past prime ministers, six served more than 5 years while twenty served less than a year. Itō Hirobumi became the first Japanese prime minister in 1885 and is the only person to have served on four occasions. Shinzo Abe is the longest-serving prime minister with over eight years on two occasions, while Prince Naruhiko Higashikuni is the shortest-serving at eight weeks. Katsura Tarō was the longest-serving prime minister in the Imperial period (1885–1947) and the only person to have served on three occasions.

== List of office holders by tenure ==
- Liberal Democratic (26)
- Nonpartisan (9)
- Military (Army) (6)
- Rikken Seiyūkai (6)
- Military (Navy) (5)
- Taisei Yokusankai (4)
- Democratic (1998–2016) (3)
- Kenseikai (2)
- Rikken Minseitō (2)
- Socialist (2)
- Kenseitō (1)
- Rikken Dōshikai (1)
- Imperial Family (1)
- Liberal (1945–1948) (1)
- Democratic (1947–1950) (1)
- Democratic Liberal (1)
- Liberal (1950–1955) (1)
- Democratic (1954–1955) (1)
- New (1)
- Renewal (1)

Rank	Prime Minister		Party	Start	End	Tenure length (term)	Tenure length (total)	Reason for exit	Ref.
1	Shinzo Abe	Shinzo Abe	Liberal Democratic	26 September 2006	26 September 2007	1 year, 1 day	8 years, 267 days	Resigned due to illness	
1	Shinzo Abe	Shinzo Abe	Liberal Democratic	26 December 2012	16 September 2020	7 years, 266 days	8 years, 267 days	Resigned due to illness	
2	Katsura Tarō	Katsura Tarō	Military (Army)	2 June 1901	7 January 1906	4 years, 220 days	7 years, 330 days	Resigned	
2	Katsura Tarō	Katsura Tarō	Military (Army)	14 July 1908	30 August 1911	3 years, 48 days	7 years, 330 days	Resigned	
2	Katsura Tarō	Katsura Tarō	Independent	21 December 1912	20 February 1913	62 days	7 years, 330 days	Resigned	
3	Eisaku Satō	Eisaku Satō	Liberal Democratic	9 November 1964	7 July 1972	7 years, 242 days		Resigned	
4	Itō Hirobumi	Itō Hirobumi	Independent	22 December 1885	30 April 1888	2 years, 131 days	7 years, 164 days	Resigned	
4	Itō Hirobumi	Itō Hirobumi	Independent	8 August 1892	31 August 1896	4 years, 24 days	7 years, 164 days	Resigned	
4	Itō Hirobumi	Itō Hirobumi	Independent	12 January 1898	30 June 1898	170 days	7 years, 164 days	Resigned	
4	Itō Hirobumi	Itō Hirobumi	Rikken Seiyūkai	19 October 1900	10 May 1901	204 days	7 years, 164 days	Resigned	
5	Shigeru Yoshida	Shigeru Yoshida	Liberal	22 May 1946	24 May 1947	1 year, 3 days	7 years, 60 days	Defeated in election	
5	Shigeru Yoshida	Shigeru Yoshida	Democratic Liberal	15 October 1948	10 December 1954	6 years, 57 days	7 years, 60 days	Resigned	
5	Shigeru Yoshida	Shigeru Yoshida	Liberal	15 October 1948	10 December 1954	6 years, 57 days	7 years, 60 days	Resigned	
6	Junichiro Koizumi	Junichiro Koizumi	Liberal Democratic	26 April 2001	26 September 2006	5 years, 154 days		Resigned	
7	Yasuhiro Nakasone	Yasuhiro Nakasone	Liberal Democratic	27 November 1982	6 November 1987	4 years, 345 days		Resigned	
8	Hayato Ikeda	Hayato Ikeda	Liberal Democratic	19 July 1960	9 November 1964	4 years, 114 days		Resigned due to illness	
9	Saionji Kinmochi	Saionji Kinmochi	Rikken Seiyūkai	7 January 1906	14 July 1908	2 years, 190 days	3 years, 304 days	Resigned	
9	Saionji Kinmochi	Saionji Kinmochi	Rikken Seiyūkai	30 August 1911	21 December 1912	1 year, 114 days	3 years, 304 days	Resigned	
10	Nobusuke Kishi	Nobusuke Kishi	Liberal Democratic	31 January 1957	19 July 1960	3 years, 171 days		Resigned	
11	Yamagata Aritomo	Yamagata Aritomo	Military (Army)	24 December 1889	6 May 1891	1 year, 134 days	3 years, 115 days	Resigned	
11	Yamagata Aritomo	Yamagata Aritomo	Military (Army)	8 November 1898	19 October 1900	1 year, 346 days	3 years, 115 days	Resigned	
12	Hara Takashi	Hara Takashi	Rikken Seiyūkai	29 September 1918	4 November 1921	3 years, 37 days		Assassinated	
13	Fumio Kishida	Fumio Kishida	Liberal Democratic	4 October 2021	1 October 2024	2 years, 364 days		Resigned	
14	Ōkuma Shigenobu	Ōkuma Shigenobu	Kenseitō	30 June 1898	8 November 1898	132 days	2 years, 309 days	Resigned	
14	Ōkuma Shigenobu	Ōkuma Shigenobu	Rikken Dōshikai	16 April 1914	9 October 1916	2 years, 177 days	2 years, 309 days	Resigned	
15	Fumimaro Konoe	Fumimaro Konoe	Independent	4 June 1937	5 January 1939	1 year, 216 days	2 years, 305 days	Resigned	
15	Fumimaro Konoe	Fumimaro Konoe	Independent	16 July 1940	18 October 1941	1 year, 95 days	2 years, 305 days	Resigned	
15	Fumimaro Konoe	Fumimaro Konoe	Imperial Rule Assistance Association	16 July 1940	18 October 1941	1 year, 95 days	2 years, 305 days	Resigned	
16	Hideki Tojo	Hideki Tojo	Imperial Rule Assistance Association	18 October 1941	22 July 1944	2 years, 279 days		Resigned	
17	Matsukata Masayoshi	Matsukata Masayoshi	Independent	6 May 1891	8 August 1892	1 year, 95 days	2 years, 212 days	Resigned	
17	Matsukata Masayoshi	Matsukata Masayoshi	Independent	18 September 1896	12 January 1898	1 year, 117 days	2 years, 212 days	Resigned	
18	Ryutaro Hashimoto	Ryutaro Hashimoto	Liberal Democratic	11 January 1996	30 July 1998	2 years, 201 days		Resigned	
19	Kakuei Tanaka	Kakuei Tanaka	Liberal Democratic	7 July 1972	9 December 1974	2 years, 156 days		Resigned	
20	Zenkō Suzuki	Zenkō Suzuki	Liberal Democratic	17 July 1980	27 November 1982	2 years, 134 days		Resigned	
21	Toshiki Kaifu	Toshiki Kaifu	Liberal Democratic	10 August 1989	5 November 1991	2 years, 88 days		Resigned	
22	Tanaka Giichi	Tanaka Giichi	Rikken Seiyūkai	20 April 1927	2 July 1929	2 years, 74 days		Resigned	
23	Saitō Makoto	Saitō Makoto	Military (Navy)	26 May 1932	8 July 1934	2 years, 44 days		Resigned	
24	Takeo Miki	Takeo Miki	Liberal Democratic	9 December 1974	24 December 1976	2 years, 16 days		Lack of majority after election	
25	Ichirō Hatoyama	Ichirō Hatoyama	Japan Democratic	10 December 1954	23 December 1956	2 years, 14 days		Resigned	
25	Ichirō Hatoyama	Ichirō Hatoyama	Liberal Democratic	10 December 1954	23 December 1956	2 years, 14 days		Resigned	
26	Terauchi Masatake	Terauchi Masatake	Military (Army)	9 October 1916	29 September 1918	1 year, 356 days		Resigned	
27	Takeo Fukuda	Takeo Fukuda	Liberal Democratic	24 December 1976	7 December 1978	1 year, 349 days		Resigned	
28	Wakatsuki Reijirō	Wakatsuki Reijirō	Kenseikai	30 January 1926	20 April 1927	1 year, 81 days	1 year, 325 days	Resigned	
28	Wakatsuki Reijirō	Wakatsuki Reijirō	Rikken Minseitō	14 April 1931	13 December 1931	244 days	1 year, 325 days	Resigned	
29	Hamaguchi Osachi	Hamaguchi Osachi	Rikken Minseitō	2 July 1929	14 April 1931	1 year, 287 days		Resigned due to injury	
30	Kiichi Miyazawa	Kiichi Miyazawa	Liberal Democratic	5 November 1991	9 August 1993	1 year, 278 days		Lack of majority after election	
31	Keizō Obuchi	Keizō Obuchi	Liberal Democratic	30 July 1998	5 April 2000	1 year, 251 days		Resigned due to illness	
32	Okada Keisuke	Okada Keisuke	Military (Navy)	8 July 1934	9 March 1936	1 year, 246 days		Resigned	
33	Katō Takaaki	Katō Takaaki	Kenseikai	11 June 1924	28 January 1926	1 year, 232 days		Died	
34	Noboru Takeshita	Noboru Takeshita	Liberal Democratic	6 November 1987	3 June 1989	1 year, 210 days		Resigned	
35	Tomiichi Murayama	Tomiichi Murayama	Socialist	30 June 1994	11 January 1996	1 year, 196 days		Resigned	
36	Masayoshi Ōhira	Masayoshi Ōhira	Liberal Democratic	7 December 1978	12 June 1980	1 year, 189 days		Died	
37	Yamamoto Gonnohyōe	Yamamoto Gonnohyōe	Military (Navy)	20 February 1913	16 April 1914	1 year, 56 days	1 year, 184 days	Resigned	
37	Yamamoto Gonnohyōe	Yamamoto Gonnohyōe	Military (Navy)	2 September 1923	7 January 1924	128 days	1 year, 184 days	Resigned	
38	Kuroda Kiyotaka	Kuroda Kiyotaka	Military (Army)	30 April 1888	25 October 1889	1 year, 179 days		Resigned	
39	Yoshihiko Noda	Yoshihiko Noda	Democratic	2 September 2011	26 December 2012	1 year, 116 days		Defeated in election	
40	Naoto Kan	Naoto Kan	Democratic	8 June 2010	2 September 2011	1 year, 87 days		Resigned	
41	Katō Tomosaburō	Katō Tomosaburō	Military (Navy)	12 June 1922	24 August 1923	1 year, 74 days		Died	
42	Sanae Takaichi	Sanae Takaichi	Liberal Democratic	21 October 2025	Incumbent	1 year, 22 days (Note: As of 11 November 2026)		Incumbent	
43	Yoshirō Mori	Yoshirō Mori	Liberal Democratic	5 April 2000	26 April 2001	1 year, 22 days		Resigned	
44	Shigeru Ishiba	Shigeru Ishiba	Liberal Democratic	1 October 2024	21 October 2025	1 year, 21 days		Resigned	
45	Yoshihide Suga	Yoshihide Suga	Liberal Democratic	16 September 2020	4 October 2021	1 year, 19 days		Resigned	
46	Yasuo Fukuda	Yasuo Fukuda	Liberal Democratic	26 September 2007	24 September 2008	365 days		Resigned	
47	Tarō Asō	Tarō Asō	Liberal Democratic	24 September 2008	16 September 2009	358 days		Defeated in election	
48	Kōki Hirota	Kōki Hirota	Independent	9 March 1936	2 February 1937	331 days		Resigned	
49	Tetsu Katayama	Tetsu Katayama	Socialist	24 May 1947	10 March 1948	292 days		Resigned	
50	Yukio Hatoyama	Yukio Hatoyama	Democratic	16 September 2009	8 June 2010	266 days		Resigned	
51	Morihiro Hosokawa	Morihiro Hosokawa	New	9 August 1993	28 April 1994	263 days		Resigned	
52	Kuniaki Koiso	Kuniaki Koiso	Imperial Rule Assistance Association	22 July 1944	7 April 1945	260 days		Resigned	
53	Hiranuma Kiichirō	Hiranuma Kiichirō	Independent	5 January 1939	30 August 1939	238 days		Resigned	
54	Kijūrō Shidehara	Kijūrō Shidehara	Independent	9 October 1945	22 May 1946	226 days		Defeated in election	
55	Hitoshi Ashida	Hitoshi Ashida	Democratic	10 March 1948	15 October 1948	220 days		Resigned	
56	Takahashi Korekiyo	Takahashi Korekiyo	Rikken Seiyūkai	13 November 1921	12 June 1922	212 days		Resigned	
57	Mitsumasa Yonai	Mitsumasa Yonai	Military (Navy)	16 January 1940	22 July 1940	189 days		Resigned	
58	Kiyoura Keigo	Kiyoura Keigo	Independent	7 January 1924	11 June 1924	157 days		Defeated in election	
59	Inukai Tsuyoshi	Inukai Tsuyoshi	Rikken Seiyūkai	13 December 1931	15 May 1932	155 days		Assassinated	
60	Nobuyuki Abe	Nobuyuki Abe	Military (Army)	30 August 1939	16 January 1940	140 days		Resigned	
61	Kantarō Suzuki	Kantarō Suzuki	Imperial Rule Assistance Association	7 April 1945	17 August 1945	133 days		Resigned	
61	Kantarō Suzuki	Kantarō Suzuki	Independent	7 April 1945	17 August 1945	133 days		Resigned	
62	Senjūrō Hayashi	Senjūrō Hayashi	Military (Army)	2 February 1937	4 June 1937	123 days		Resigned	
63	Sōsuke Uno	Sōsuke Uno	Liberal Democratic	3 June 1989	10 August 1989	69 days		Resigned	
64	Tanzan Ishibashi	Tanzan Ishibashi	Liberal Democratic	23 December 1956	25 February 1957	65 days		Resigned due to illness	
65	Tsutomu Hata	Tsutomu Hata	Renewal	28 April 1994	30 June 1994	64 days		Resigned	
66	Prince Naruhiko Higashikuni	Prince Naruhiko Higashikuni	Imperial Family	17 August 1945	9 October 1945	54 days		Resigned	

== See also ==
- List of prime ministers of Japan
- List of prime ministers of Japan by education
- List of prime ministers of Japan by home prefecture
