= Yuki Ishikawa =

Yuki Ishikawa may refer to:

- Yuki Ishikawa (wrestler, born 1967), Japanese wrestler
- Yuki Ishikawa (volleyball) (born 1987), Japanese volleyball player
- Yuki Ishikawa (wrestler, born 1995), Japanese wrestler
- Yūki Ishikawa (born 1995), Japanese volleyball player
