= Seijo University =

Private university in Seijo, Setagaya-ku, Tokyo, Japan

Coordinates: 35.6422°N 139.601°E

- 成城大学
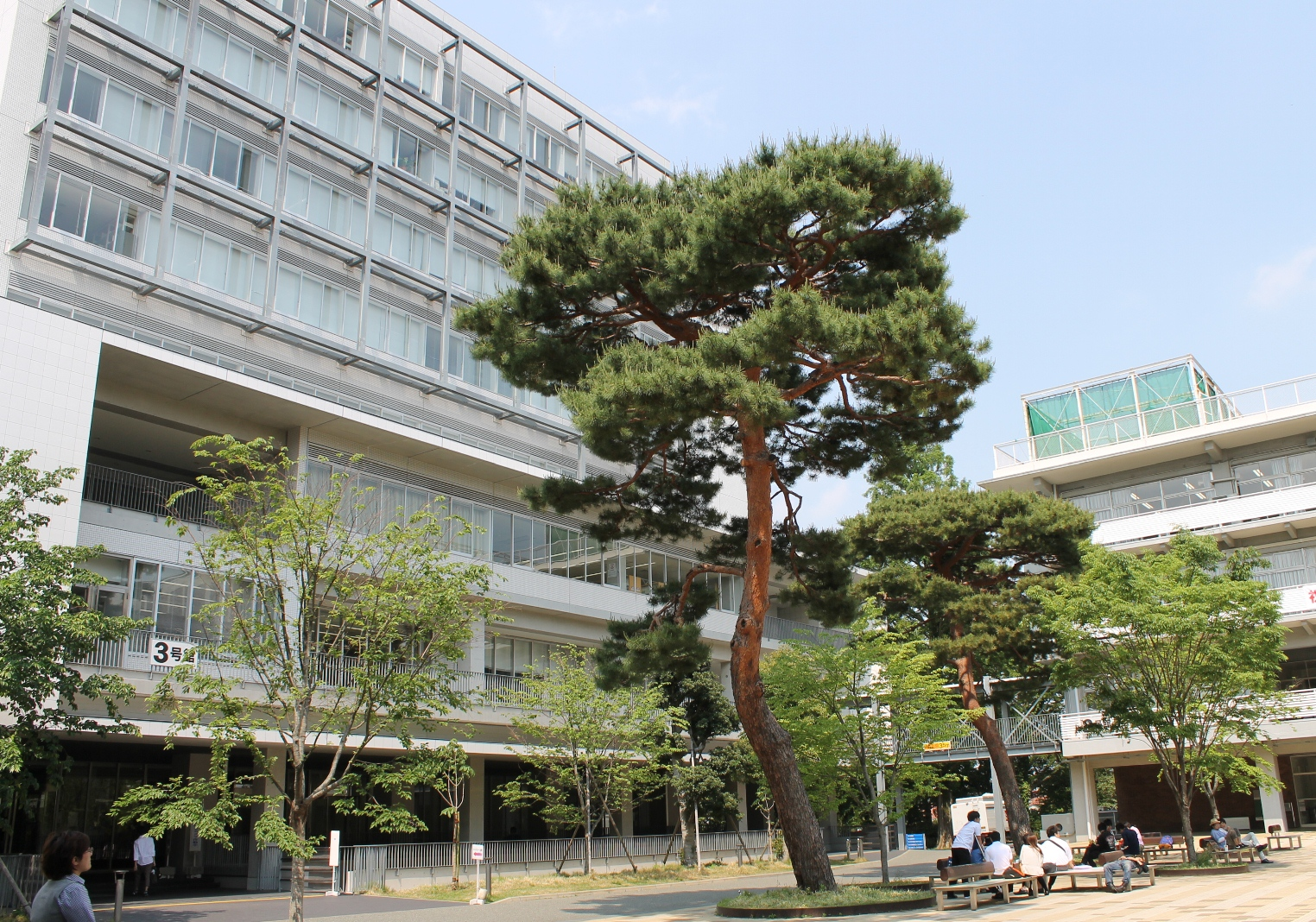
- Type: Private
- Established: 1950
- President: Yuji Yui
- Location: Setagaya-ku, Tokyo, Japan
- Campus: Urban
- Member of: Tokyo 4 Universities
- Colors: Deep blue
- Website: www.seijo.ac.jp/en/

Seijo University (成城大学, Seijō Daigaku) is a private university in Seijō, Setagaya-ku, Tokyo, Japan. It is operated by the Seijo Gakuen institute.

== History ==
Seijo University has its origins in Seijo Gakuen (成城学園), which was founded in 1917 by Masataro Sawayanagi, a former minister of education. Under the pre–World War II education system, it was called "Seijo Higher School". It became Seijo University in 1950. As the founder Masataro Sawayanagi directed, the university values education of respecting and developing individual perspectives by providing a wide range of small-sized classes.

In 2017, the school celebrated 100 years since the Seijo Gakuen Education Institute was founded.

== Graduate schools ==
- Graduate School of Economics
- Graduate School of Literature
- Graduate School of Law
- Graduate School of Social Innovation

== Undergraduate schools ==
- Faculty of Economics - Economics - Business administration
- Faculty of Arts and Literature - Japanese literature (Chinese classical literature, Linguistics) - English literature (English literature, English linguistics, British and American culture) - Arts (Music, Play, Films history, Art history in eastern, European and Japanese areas). It is quite rare studies provided from higher education institutes in Japan. - Cultural history - Mass communication and medias - European cultural history
- Faculty of Law - Law
- Faculty of Social Innovation - Policy innovation - Psychological society

== Others ==
- Seijo University Library
- Research Centers - Economics - Folklore - Contemporary Law - Glocal Studies
- Media Network Center (MNC)
- International Exchange Office (IEO)
- Career Center
- Educational Innovation Center

== Notable alumni ==
- Tsutomu Hata, former Prime Minister of Japan
- Yūko Obuchi, member of House of Representatives of Japan
- Taku Eto, member of House of Representatives of Japan
- Yoko Komiyama, member of House of Representatives of Japan
- Takao Fujii, member of House of Councillors of Japan
- Mitsuyoshi Yanagisawa, member of House of Councillors of Japan
- Chiaki Ishihara, professor (Waseda University)
- Mitsuhiro Seki, professor (Hitotsubashi University)
- Sukeyuki Miura, professor (Chiba University, Rissho University)
- Masahiko Miyawaki, professor (Waseda University)
- Takehiko Iwasaki, associate professor (Kumamoto University)
- Nobuhiko Obayashi, movie producer
- Hitonari Tsuji, novelist
- Hiroshi Ogiwara, novelist
- Tetsuya Sato, novelist
- Aki Sato, novelist
- Minoru Ozawa, haiku poet
- Yumi Yoshimoto, songwriter, novelist, essayist
- Tomomi Tsutsui, screenwriter, novelist
- Chiaki J. Konaka, screenwriter
- Yukiko Konosu, essayist, translator
- Yuka Saitō, essayist
- Shuntaro Ono, literary critic
- Minako Saito, literary critic
- Naotaro Moriyama, musician
- Tomu Muto, former member of AKB48
- Keiichiro Akagi, actor
- Masakazu Tamura, actor
- Masahiro Takashima, actor
- Masanobu Takashima, actor
- Ken Ishiguro, actor
- Mitsuhiro Oikawa, actor, singer
- Yukiyoshi Ozawa, actor
- Kazuki Enari, actor, talent
- Shima Iwashita, actress
- Satoko Oshima, actress, talent
- Honami Suzuki, actress
- Mayu Tsuruta, actress
- Yuko Ito, actress
- Yoshino Kimura, actress
- Moe Yamaguchi, actress, talent
- Yuka Nomura, actress
- Kazuyuki Yoshida, announcer (NHK)
- Tomoki Tanaka, announcer (NHK)
- Toshihisa Osaka, announcer (NHK)
- Jun Ogura, free announcer (NTV), associate professor (Edogawa University)
- Hiroki Ando, announcer (TBS)
- Kazuhiro Watanabe, announcer (Fuji TV)
- Minako Nagai, free announcer (NTV)
- Tohko Amemiya, essayist, free announcer (TBS)
- Saori Fujimura, announcer (Fuji TV)
- Eri Mizuhara, announcer (TV Tokyo)
- Yukari Oshima, announcer (Fuji TV)
- Erina Masuda, announcer (TBS)
- Akiyo Yoshida, announcer (TBS)
- Shoko Yoshimura - Amateur wrestler; 5-time world champion
- Orin Muto, member of AKB48

== See also ==
- Lycée Seijo – Defunct boarding school in France affiliated with this university
