= Masataro Sawayanagi =

Japanese educator, bureaucrat (1865–1927)

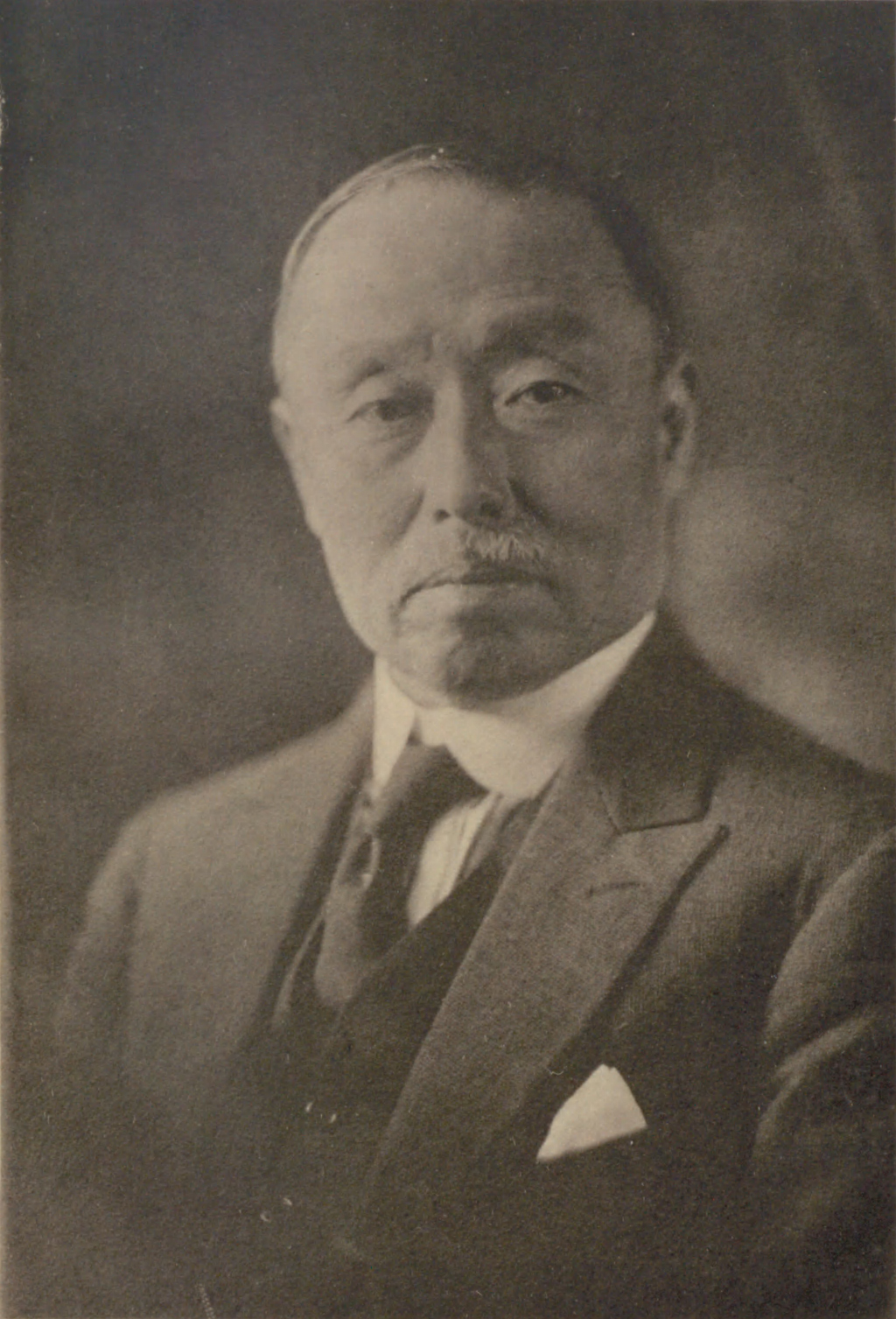
- Born: March 17, 1865
- Died: December 24, 1927 (aged 62)
- Occupations: Educator, academic administrator

Masataro Sawayanagi (澤柳 政太郎, Sawayanagi Masatarō; May 17, 1865 – December 24, 1927) was a Japanese educator, academic administrator and government official.

== Biography ==
He was selected as a member of the House of Peers in 1909. In 1911, he became the first president of Tohoku University in Sendai City. In 1913, he was appointed the president of Kyoto University. He is best known for writing the Revised Elementary School Code of 1900.
