= Seijo Gakuen Education Institute =

The Seijo Gakuen Education Institute (学校法人成城学園, Gakkō Hōjin Seijō Gakuen) is an educational institute that operates universities and schools in Japan, and previously outside Japan.

== Institutions ==
Current:

- Seijo University (Tokyo)
- Seijo Gakuen Junior High School and High School
- Seijo Gakuen Elementary School
- Seijo Gakuen Kindergarten

Former:

- Lycée Seijo (Kientzheim, France)
