= Prime Minister of Japan =

Head of government

- 日本国内閣総理大臣
- Emblem of the prime minister of Japan

- Standard of the prime minister of Japan

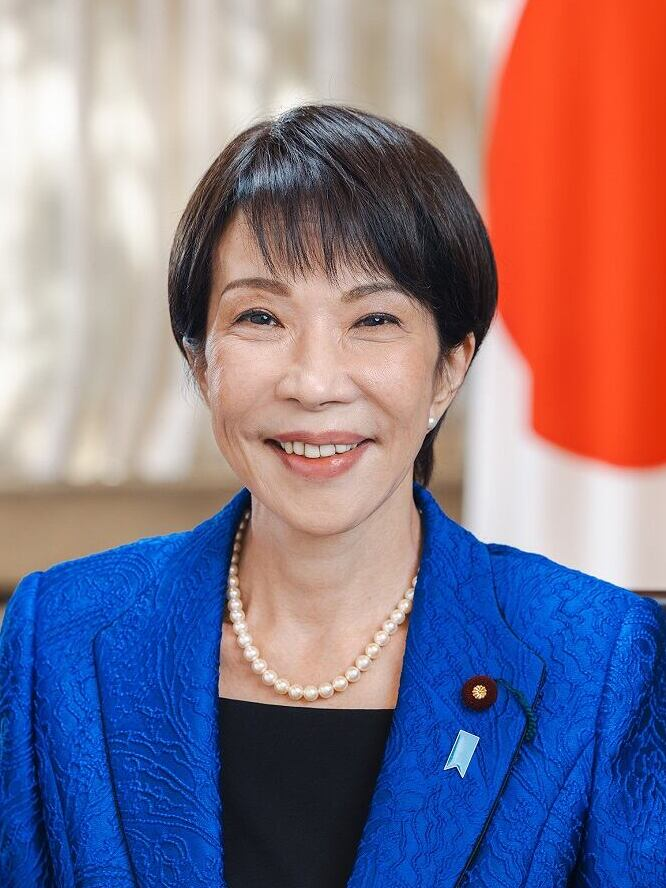
- Incumbent; Sanae Takaichi since 21 October 2025
- Executive branch of the Japanese government; Office of the Prime Minister
- Style: Naikaku sōridaijin (formal); Her Excellency (formal and diplomatic); Shushō (informal and during party debates); Sōri (informal)
- Type: Head of government; Commander-in-chief
- Member of: Cabinet; National Security Council; National Intelligence Council; National Diet
- Residence: Naikaku Sōri Daijin Kantei
- Seat: Tokyo
- Nominator: National Diet
- Appointer: HM The Emperor
- Term length: No fixed term; Resigns upon loss of confidence or House of Representatives opening; reappointable
- Constituting instrument: Constitution of Japan
- Precursor: Daijō-daijin of Japan
- Formation: 22 December 1885; 140 years ago
- First holder: Itō Hirobumi
- Deputy: Deputy Prime Minister; Chief Cabinet Secretary (Note: The Deputy Prime Minister position is vacant.)
- Salary: ¥40,490,000 (equivalent to approximately US$260,000) annually
- Website: Official website

The prime minister of Japan (内閣総理大臣, Naikaku Sōri Daijin; Japanese pronunciation: [naꜜi.ka.kɯ | soː.ɾʲi daꜜi.dʑiɴ]) is the head of government of Japan. The prime minister chairs the Cabinet of Japan and has the ability to select and dismiss its ministers of state. The prime minister also serves as the commander-in-chief of the Japan Self Defence Forces.

The National Diet (parliament) acts as an electoral college and both houses nominate the prime minister from among their members (typically from among the members of the House of Representatives). Each house conducts a ballot under the run-off system, though the nominee of the House of Representatives prevails if the two houses disagree on the nomination. They are then formally appointed by the emperor. The prime minister must retain the confidence of the House of Representatives to remain in office. Conventionally, the prime minister is almost always the leader of the majority party in the House of Representatives or the leader of the senior partner in the governing coalition, though there have been cabinet prime ministers from junior coalition partners. The prime minister lives and works at the Naikaku Sōri Daijin Kantei (Prime Minister's Official Residence) in Nagatachō, Chiyoda, Tokyo, close to the National Diet Building.

Before the adoption of the Meiji Constitution, Japan had in practice no written constitution. Under the Yōrō Code enacted in 752, the Daijō-daijin was the head of the Daijō-kan (Department of State), the highest organ of Japan's pre-modern Imperial government during the Heian period and until briefly under the Meiji Constitution. The office was replaced with the office of prime minister on 22 December 1885 with the appointment of Itō Hirobumi to the new position. The Meiji Constitution was adopted in 1890, which gave the emperor the powers to appoint and dismiss the prime minister and cabinet members. During this period, the Prime Minister and his Cabinet were not necessarily chosen from the elected members of parliament. The modern constitution, adopted in 1947, transferred formal executive powers from the emperor to the prime minister, as well as designating the Diet as the nominator of the prime minister instead of the emperor.

The prime minister exercises control and supervision over the entire executive branch and appoints all Cabinet ministers, with the power to dismiss them any time. They present bills to the Diet on behalf of the Cabinet, and sign laws and Cabinet orders along with other members of the Cabinet. They also have the power to call an early election by advising the emperor to dissolve the House of Representatives. Powers of the prime minister have grown significantly in the 21st century. The prime minister is one of the world's most powerful political leaders in modern times. As the leader of the world's fourth largest economy, the prime minister holds significant domestic and international leadership, being the leader of a prominent member state of the G7 and G20.

As of 2026, sixty-six people (sixty-five men and one woman) have served as prime minister. The longest-serving prime minister was Shinzo Abe, who served over eight years across two non-consecutive terms, and the shortest-serving was Prince Naruhiko Higashikuni, who served fifty-four days. Sanae Takaichi succeeded Shigeru Ishiba as prime minister on 21 October 2025, following the 2025 Liberal Democratic Party presidential election; she is the first woman to serve as prime minister.

== Designation ==
=== Abbreviations ===
In Japanese, due to the special nature of the work of the head of government, the prime minister's titles vary depending on context, sometimes demonstrating their role. Since the inception of the cabinet system, the prime minister is known in Japanese as Naikaku Sōri-Daijin (内閣総理大臣) whenever they are referred to as the head of the Cabinet; however, this title is usually abbreviated to Sōri-Daijin (総理大臣). Other abbreviations include Sōri (総理), Shushō (首相), or Saishō (宰相).

=== English notation ===
The official English rendering is "Prime Minister". Before the introduction of the cabinet system, the translation "Grand Minister" was sometimes historically used, as was the translated German term "Minister President of the State".

== History ==
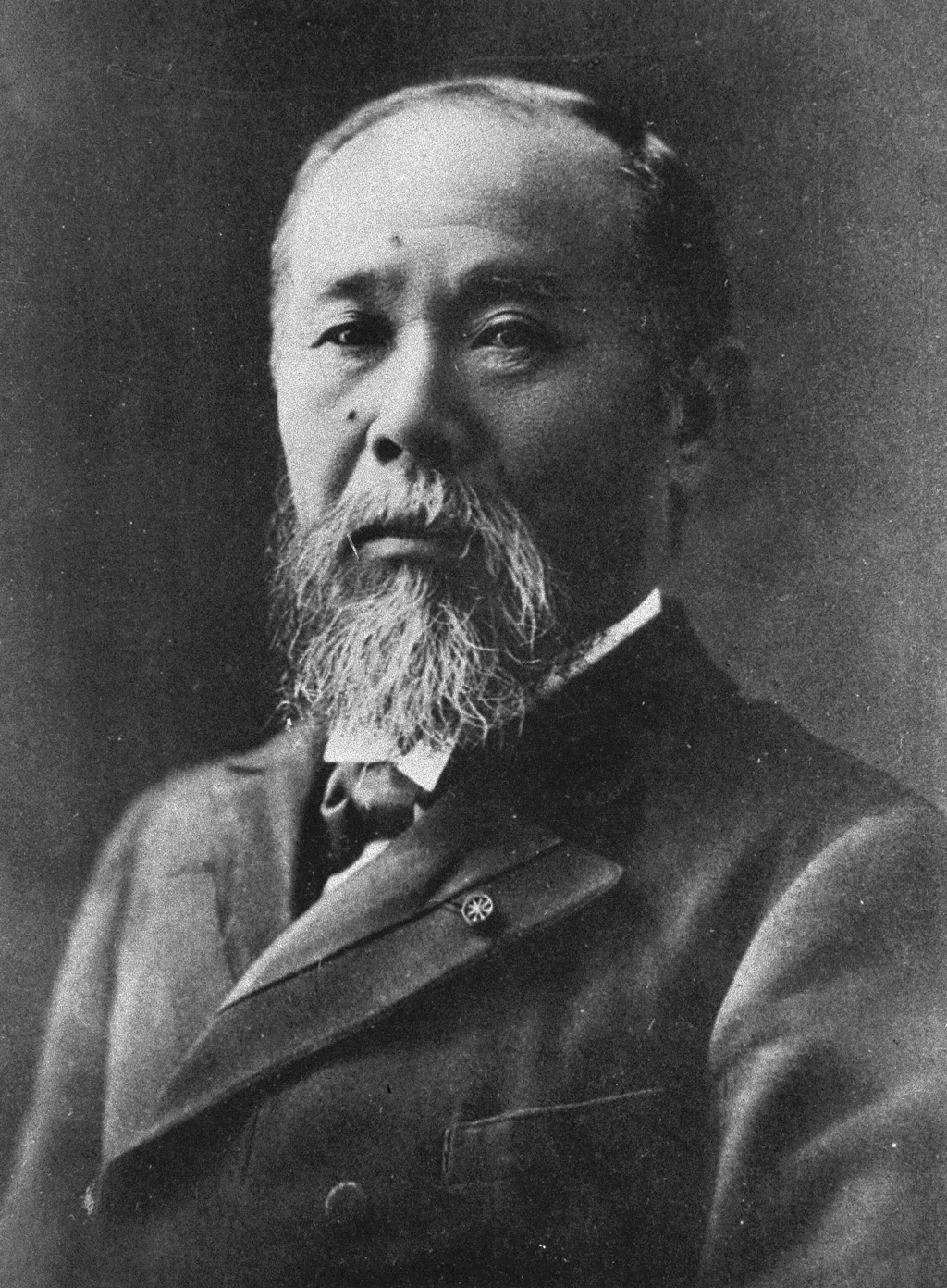
Itō Hirobumi, the first Prime Minister of Japan

Before the adoption of the Meiji Constitution, Japan had in practice no written constitution. Originally, a Chinese-inspired legal system known as ritsuryō was enacted in the late Asuka period and early Nara period. It described a government based on an elaborate and rational meritocratic bureaucracy, serving, in theory, under the ultimate authority of the emperor; although in practice, real power was often held elsewhere, such as in the hands of the Fujiwara clan, who intermarried with the imperial family in the Heian period, or by the ruling shōgun. Theoretically, the last ritsuryō code, the Yōrō Code enacted in 752, was still in force at the time of the Meiji Restoration.

Under this system, the Daijō-daijin (太政大臣; Chancellor of the Realm) was the head of the Daijō-kan (Department of State), the highest organ of Japan's pre-modern Imperial government during the Heian period and until briefly under the Meiji Constitution with the appointment of Sanjō Sanetomi in 1871. The office was replaced in 1885 with the appointment of Itō Hirobumi to the new position of Minister President of State, four years before the enactment of the Meiji Constitution, which mentions neither the Cabinet nor the position of Prime Minister explicitly. It took its current form with the adoption of the Constitution of Japan in 1947.

To date, sixty-six people have served in this position. The longest-serving prime minister to date is Shinzo Abe, who served in two non-consecutive terms for 8 years, 267 days: from 26 September 2006 until 26 September 2007, and from 26 December 2012 until 16 September 2020. The shortest-serving prime minister to date is Prince Naruhiko Higashikuni, who served for fifty-four days: from 17 August until 9 October 1945.

== Appointment ==
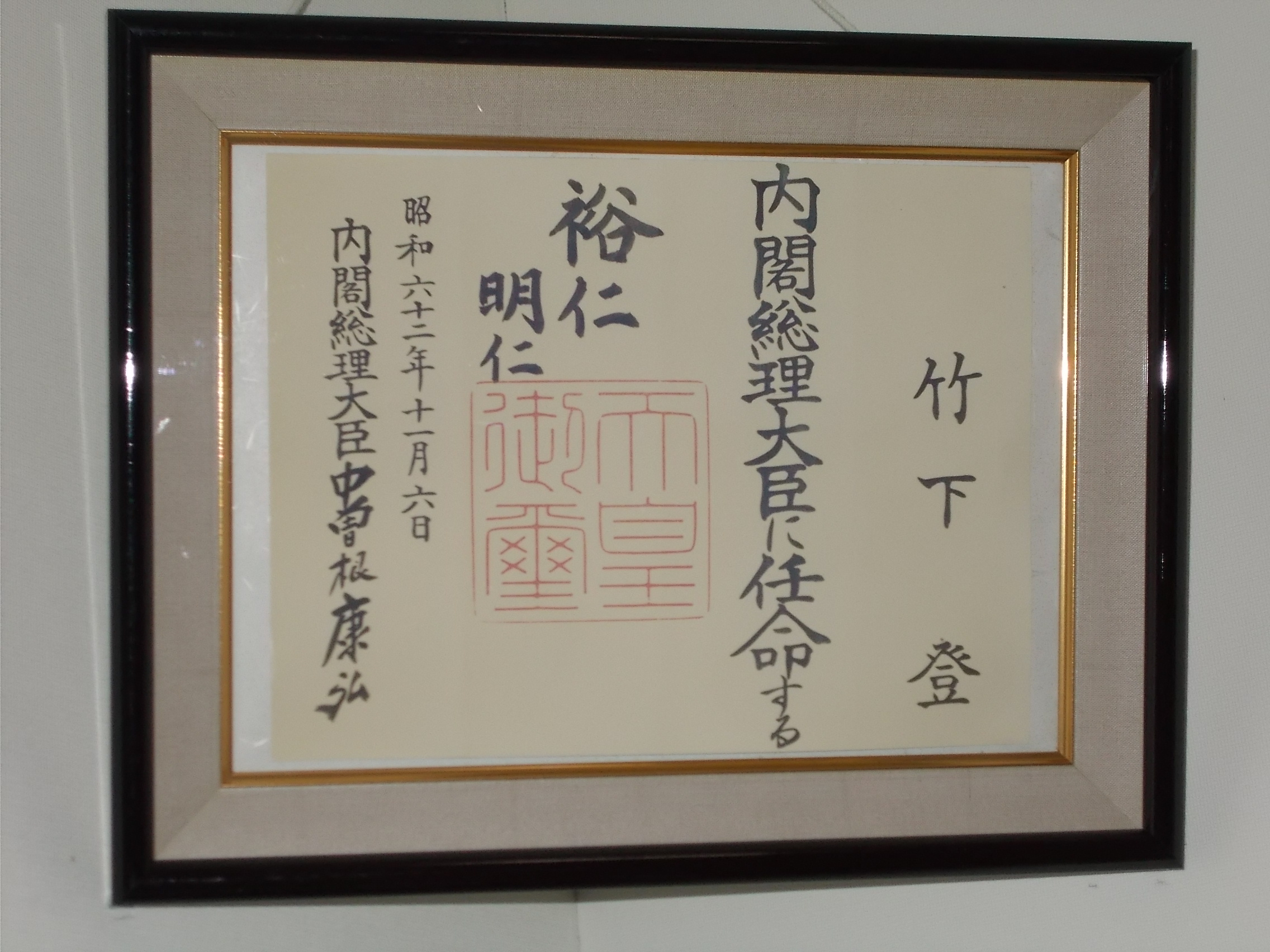
The document appointing Noboru Takeshita as prime minister. The Privy Seal of Japan and signature of Crown Prince Akihito (then temporarily performing state acts during the illness of Emperor Hirohito) can be seen in the centre, and the signature of the outgoing prime minister Yasuhiro Nakasone on the left

The prime minister is nominated by both houses of the Diet, before the conduct of any other business. Each house conducts a ballot under the run-off system. If the two houses choose different individuals, then a joint committee of both houses is appointed to agree on a common nominee. Ultimately, however, if the two houses do not agree, or if the House of Councillors does not make a nomination within 10 days after the House of Representatives vote, the nominee of the House of Representatives is deemed to be that of the Diet. Therefore, the House of Representatives can theoretically ensure the appointment of any prime minister it wants. The nominee is then formally appointed to office and presented with their appointment letter by the emperor at the Tokyo Imperial Palace.

Conventionally, since the prime minister must maintain the confidence of the Diet to stay in office, they are almost always the leader of the majority party in the House of Representatives or the leader of the senior partner in the governing coalition. But there have been three cabinet prime ministers from junior coalition partners (Hitoshi Ashida: 1948, Morihiro Hosokawa: 1993 and Tomiichi Murayama: 1994), a few minority governments (most recently the Hata Cabinet in 1994 and at least numerically the Second Hashimoto Cabinet of 1996 during its first year, but with an extra-cabinet cooperation (閣外協力, kakugai kyōryoku) agreement with two parties, sufficient to ensure safe majorities for most government initiatives), and several cabinets with a majority in the House of Representatives, but without legislative majority of their own (most recently the DPJ-led cabinets, Kan and Noda Cabinets after the 2010 upper house election; cf. Nejire Kokkai/"twisted Diets").

== Qualifications ==
- Must be a member of either house of the Diet. (This implies a minimum age of 25 and a Japanese nationality requirement.)
- Must be a civilian. This excludes serving members of the Japan Self-Defense Forces. Former military persons may be appointed, with Yasuhiro Nakasone being one prominent example.

== Role ==
=== Constitutional roles ===
- Exercises "control and supervision" over the entire executive branch.
- Presents bills to the Diet on behalf of the Cabinet.
- Signs laws and Cabinet orders (along with other members of the Cabinet).
- Appoints all Cabinet ministers, and can dismiss them at any time.
- May permit legal action to be taken against Cabinet ministers.
- Must make reports on domestic and foreign relations to the Diet.
- Must report to the Diet upon demand to provide answers or explanations.
- May advise the emperor to dissolve the House of Representatives.

=== Statutory roles ===
- Presides over meetings of the Cabinet.
- Commander-in-chief of the Japan Self-Defense Forces.
- May override a court injunction against an administrative act upon showing of cause.

Unlike most of their counterparts in constitutional monarchies, the prime minister is both de jure and de facto chief executive. In most other constitutional monarchies, the monarch is at least nominal chief executive, while being bound by convention to act on the advice of the cabinet. In contrast, the Constitution of Japan explicitly vests executive power in the Cabinet, of which the prime minister is the leader; this greatly enhances the prime minister's position compared to prime ministers in other parliamentary democracies. Their countersignature is required for all laws and Cabinet orders. While most ministers in parliamentary democracies have some freedom of action within the bounds of cabinet collective responsibility, the Japanese Cabinet is effectively an extension of the prime minister's authority.

== Insignia ==
Standard of the Prime Minister

The 5–7 Paulownia is the crest used by the Prime Minister

Emblem occasionally used by the Prime Minister

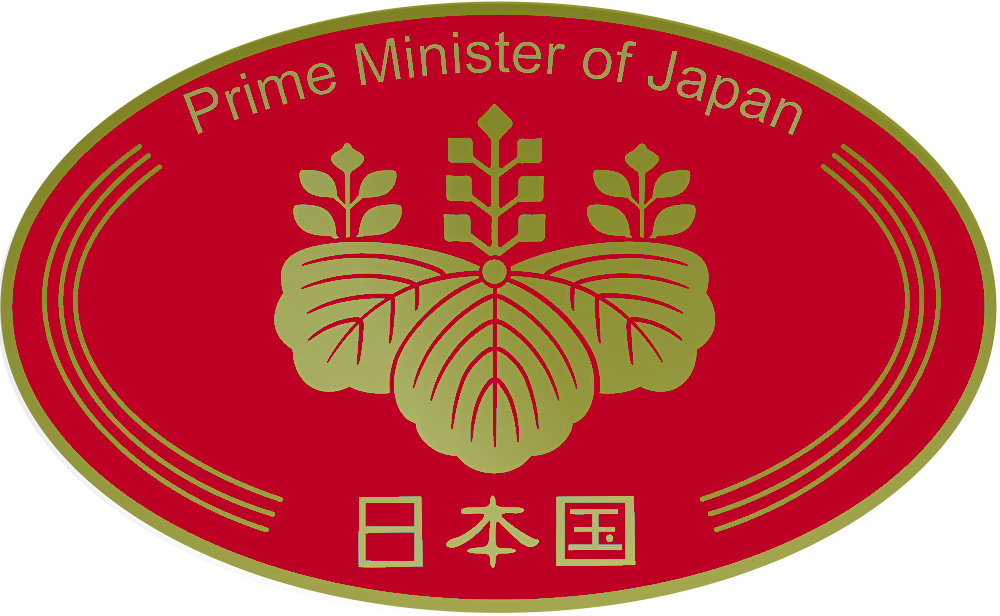
Second emblem occasionally used by the Prime Minister

== Official office and residence ==
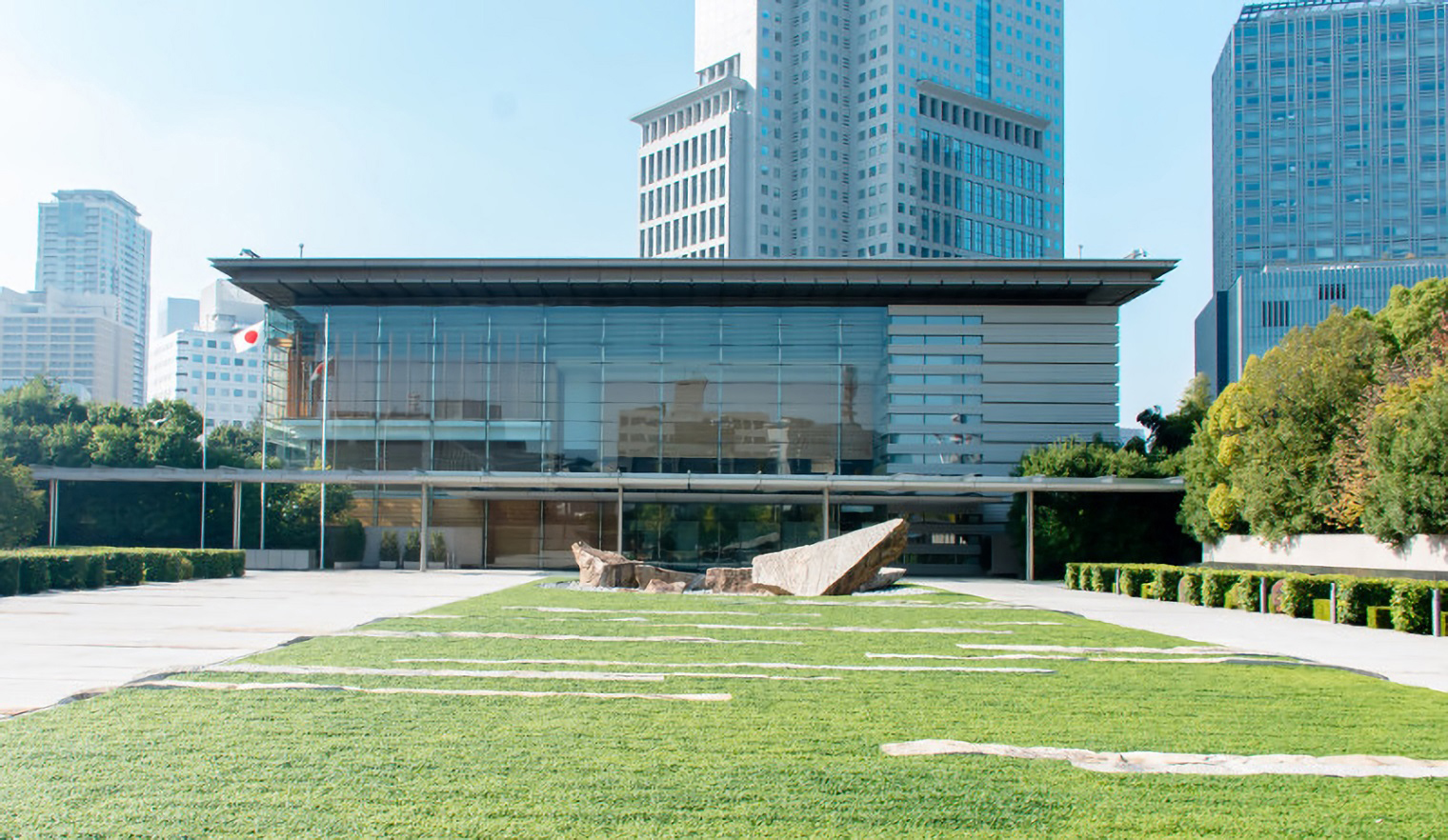
Naikaku Sōri Daijin Kantei, the Prime Minister's Office of Japan

Located near the Diet building, the Office of the Prime Minister of Japan is called the Naikaku Sōri Daijin Kantei (内閣総理大臣官邸). The original Kantei served from 1929 until 2002, when a new building was inaugurated to serve as the current Kantei. The old Kantei was then converted into the Official Residence, or Kōtei (公邸). The Kōtei lies to the southwest of the Kantei, and is linked by a walkway.

== Travel ==
The prime minister of Japan travels in a Toyota Century. The Lexus LS 600h L, which served as the prime minister's official car from 2008 to 2019, became a spare/alternative vehicle used by the Prime Minister. For overseas air travel, the Japanese government maintains two Boeing 777, which replaced the Boeing 747-400 also in 2019. The aircraft is also used by the emperor, the members of the imperial family, and other high-ranking officials. They have the radio callsigns Japanese Air Force One and Japanese Air Force Two when operating on official business, and Cygnus One and Cygnus Two when operating outside of official business (e.g., on training flights). The aircraft always fly together on government missions, with one serving as the primary transport and the other serving as a backup with maintenance personnel on board. The aircraft are officially referred to as Japanese government exclusive aircraft (日本国政府専用機, Nippon-koku seifu sen'yōki).

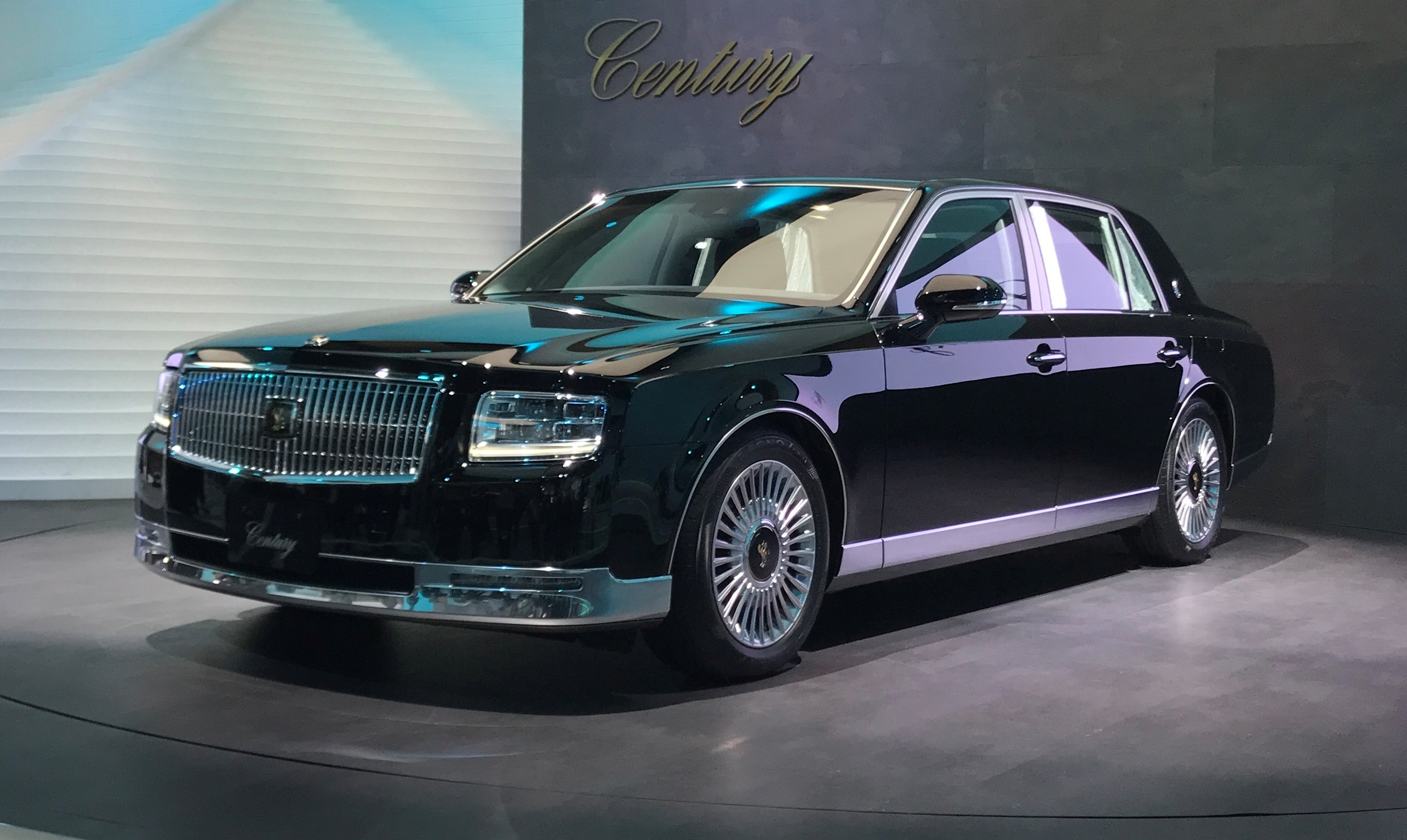
Toyota Century

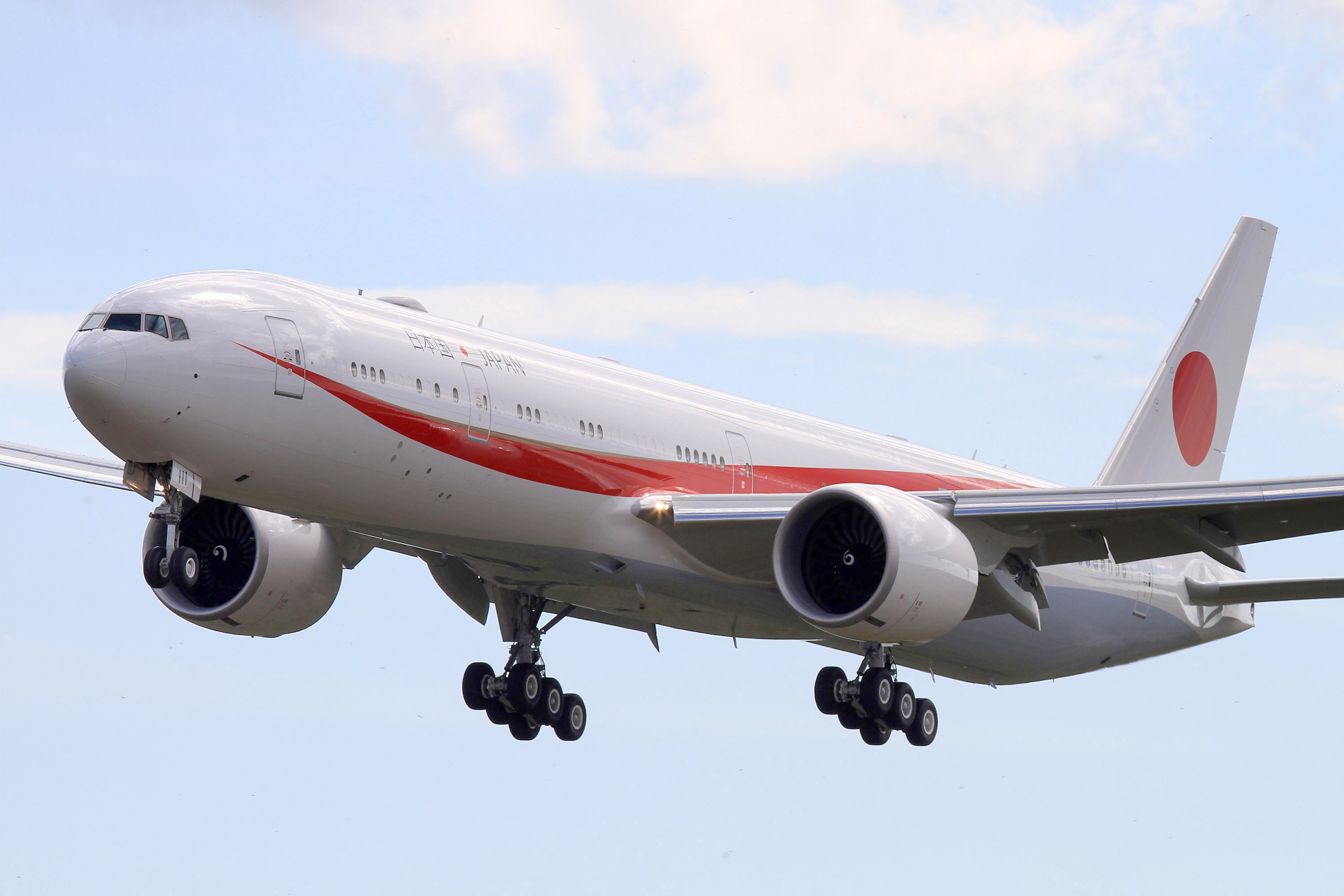
Japanese Air Force One

== Retirement honours and emoluments ==
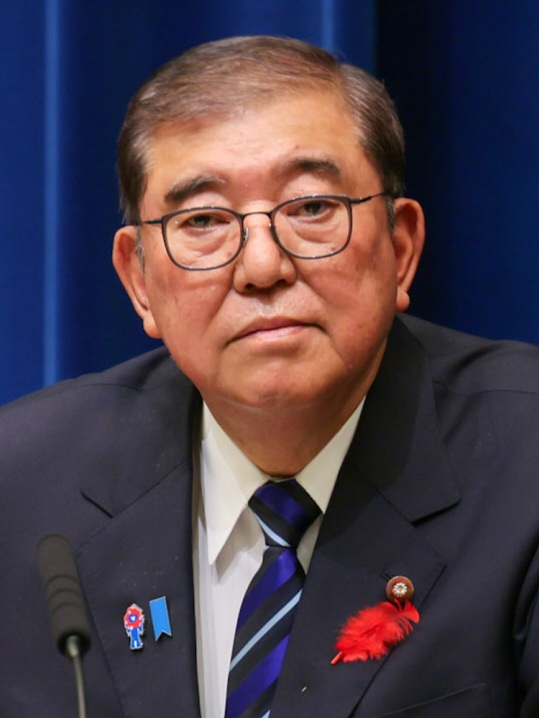
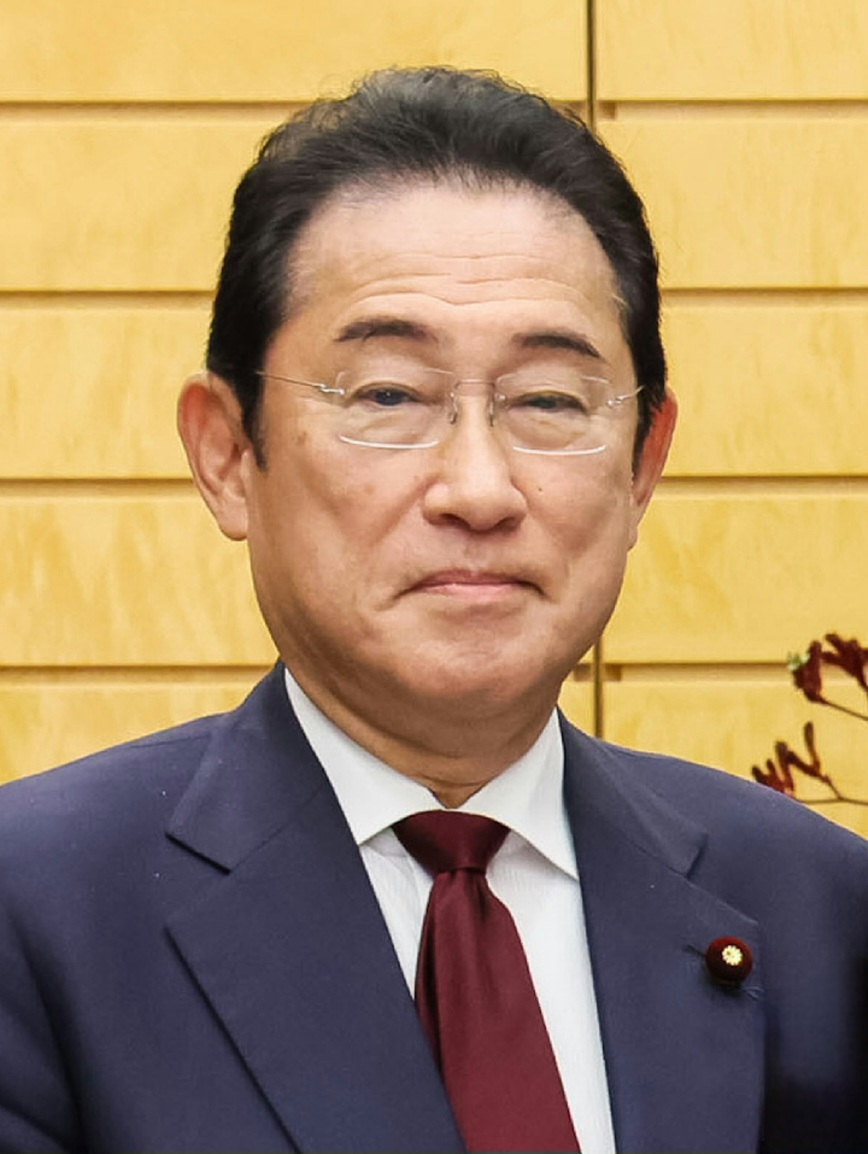
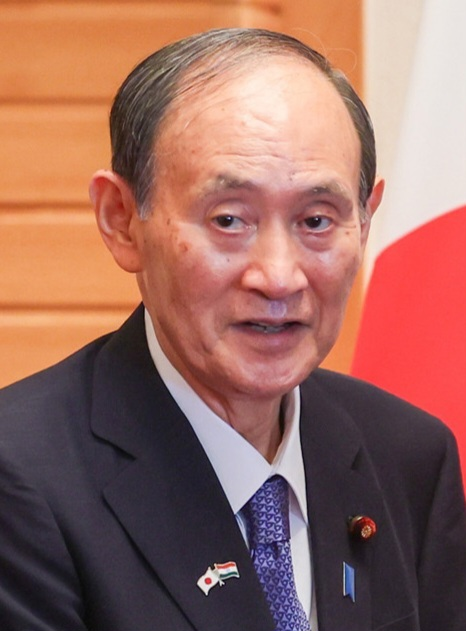
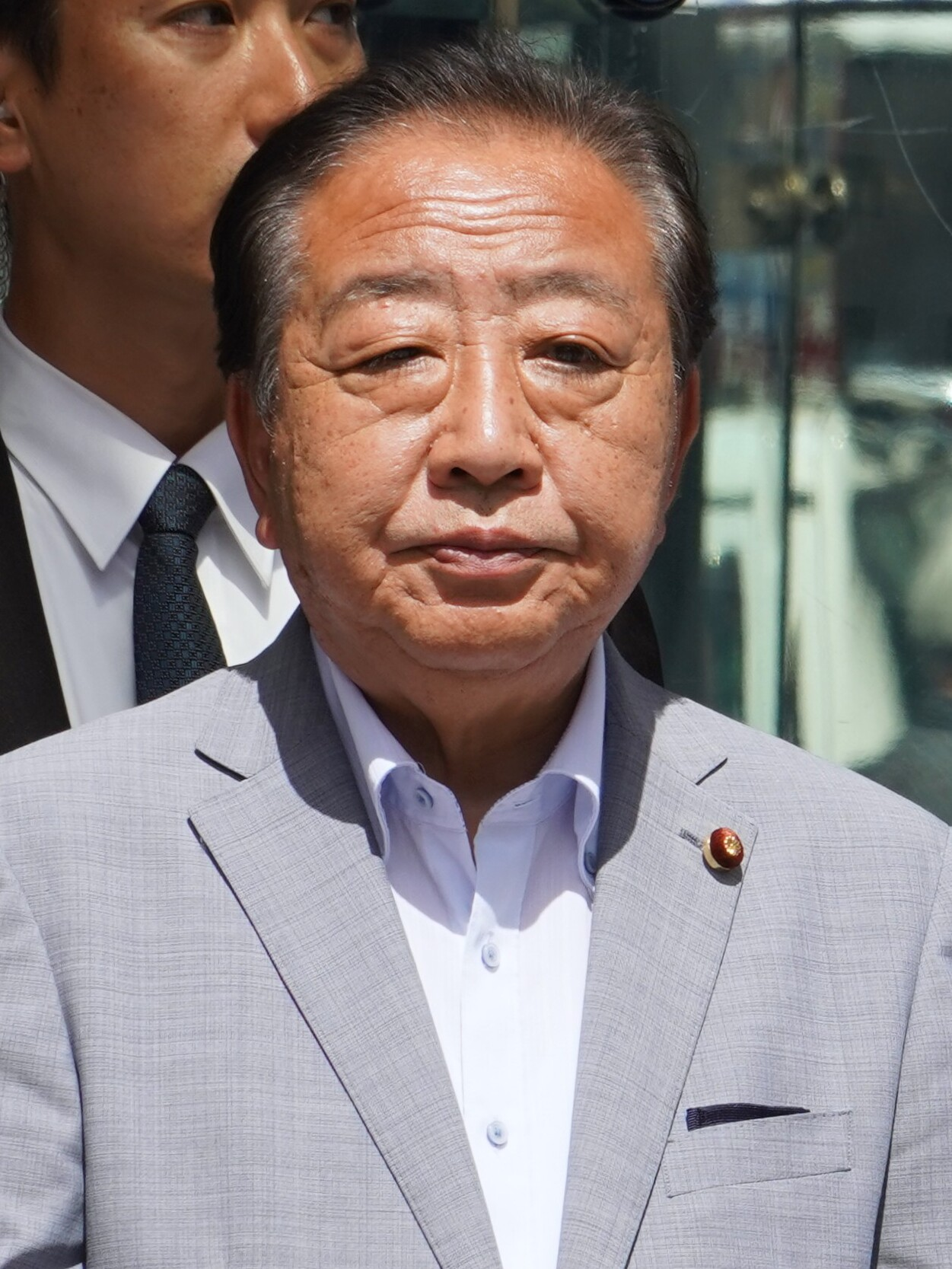
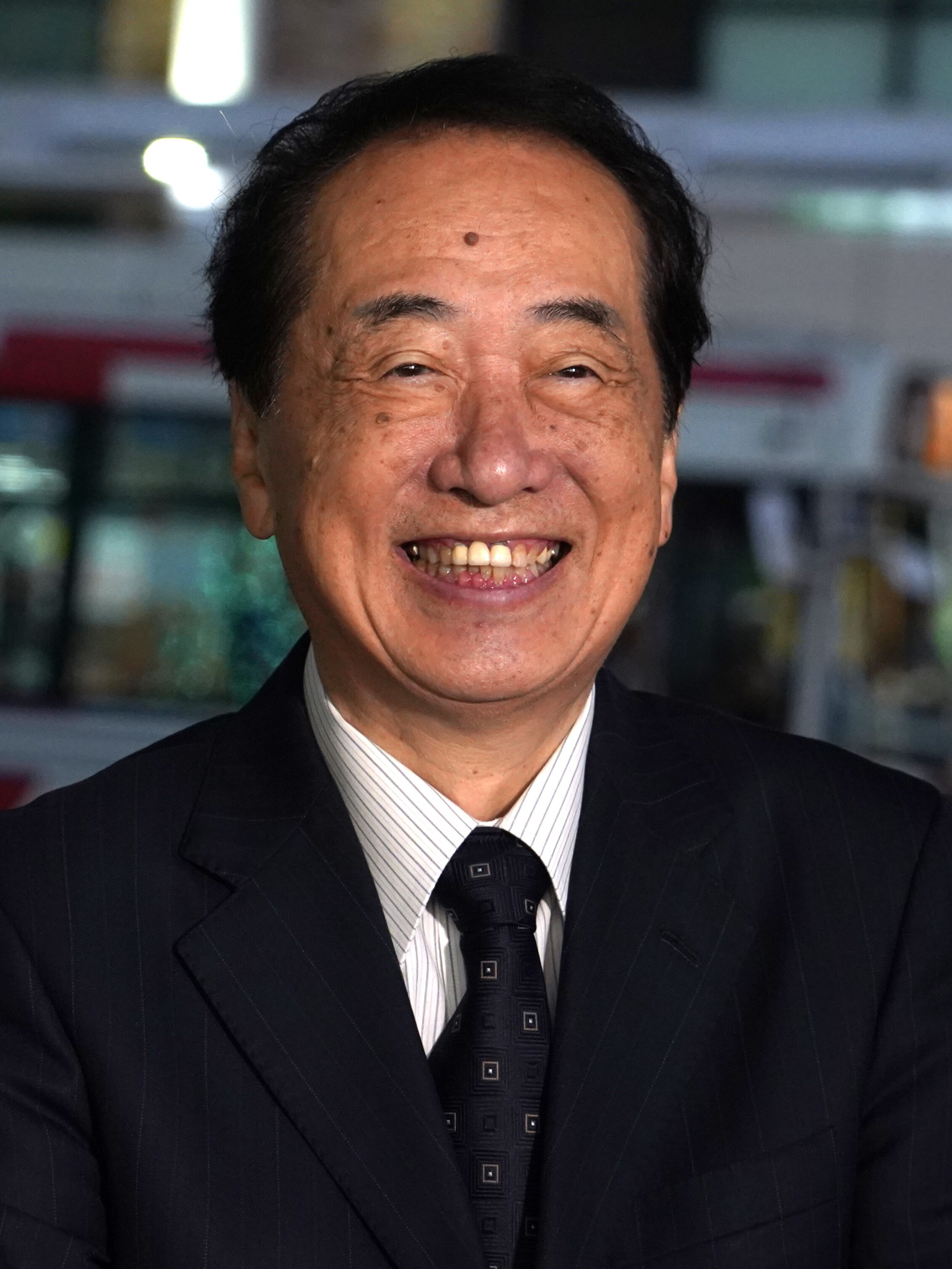
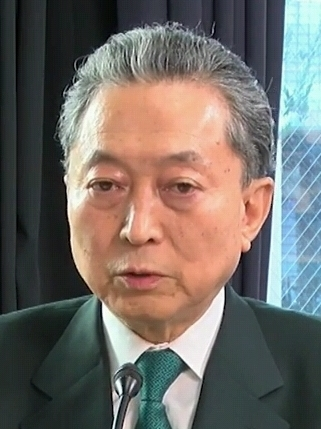
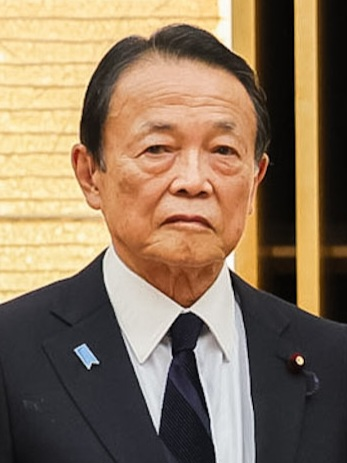
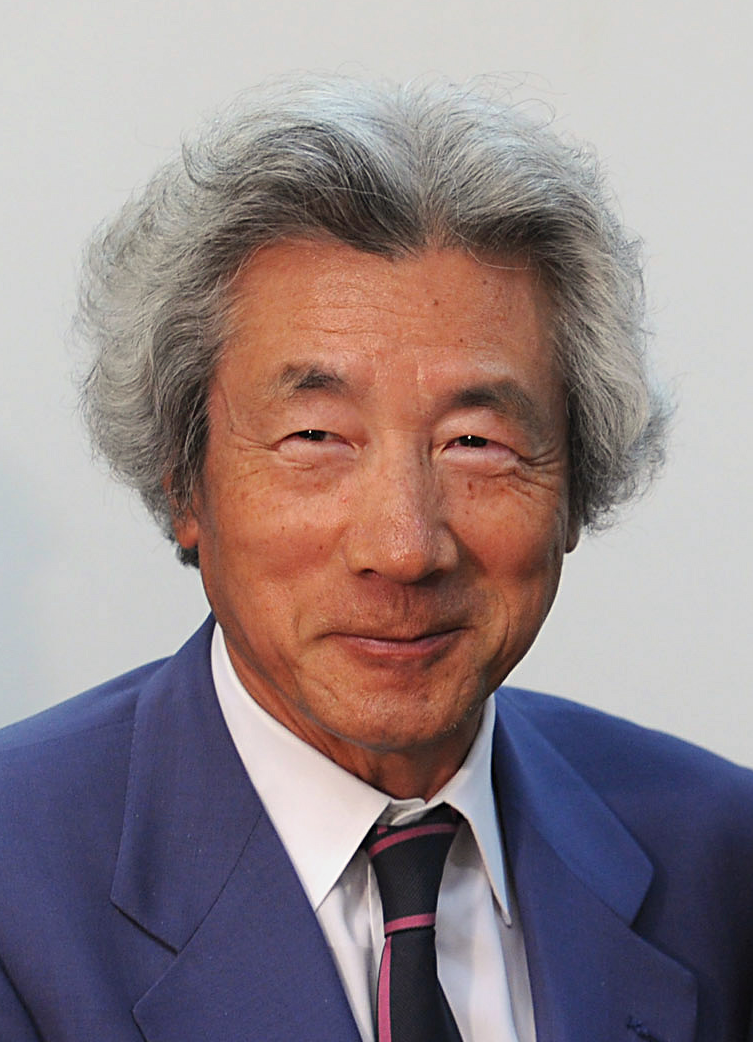
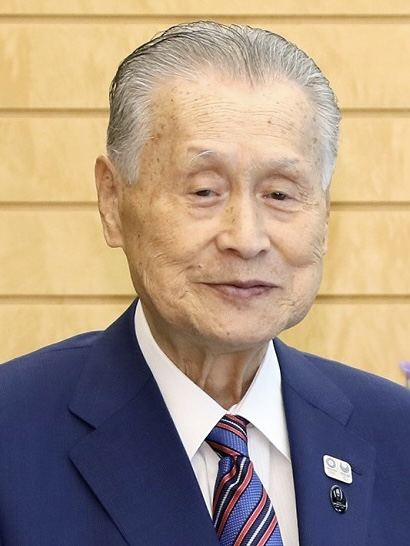
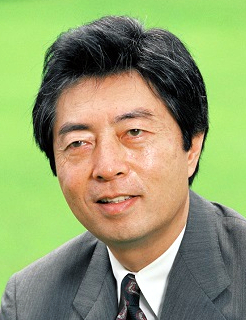
All ten living former prime ministers, left to right, top to bottom: Shigeru Ishiba, Fumio Kishida, Yoshihide Suga, Yoshihiko Noda, Naoto Kan, Yukio Hatoyama, Tarō Asō, Junichiro Koizumi, Yoshirō Mori and Morihiro Hosokawa

Until the mid-1930s, the prime minister of Japan was normally granted a hereditary peerage (kazoku) prior to leaving office if they had not already been ennobled. Titles were usually bestowed in the ranks of count, viscount or baron, depending on the relative accomplishments and status of the prime minister. The two highest ranks, marquess and prince, were only bestowed upon highly distinguished statesmen, and were not granted to a prime minister after 1928. The last prime minister who was a peer was Baron Kijūrō Shidehara, who served as Prime Minister from October 1945 to May 1946. The peerage was abolished when the Constitution of Japan came into effect in May 1947.

Certain eminent prime ministers have been awarded the Order of the Chrysanthemum, typically in the degree of Grand Cordon. The highest honour in the Japanese honours system, the Collar of the Order of the Chrysanthemum, has only been conferred upon select prime ministers and eminent statesmen; the last such award to a living prime minister was to Saionji Kinmochi in 1928. More often, the Order of the Chrysanthemum has been a posthumous distinction; both the Collar and Grand Cordon of the order were last awarded posthumously to former prime minister Shinzo Abe in July 2022.

After relinquishing office, the prime minister is normally accorded the second or senior third rank in the court order of precedence, and is usually raised to the senior second rank posthumously. Certain distinguished prime ministers have been posthumously raised to the first rank; the last such award was to Eisaku Sato in 1975, Yasuhiro Nakasone in 2019, and Shinzo Abe in 2022. Since the 1920s, following their tenure in office, prime ministers have typically been conferred with the Grand Cordon of the Order of the Paulownia Flowers (until 2003 a special higher class of the Order of the Rising Sun), depending on tenure and eminence; however, honours may be withheld due to misconduct or refusal on the part of the prime minister (for example, Kiichi Miyazawa).

The Prime Minister also awards individuals in recognition of their accomplishments in sport, entertainment, and other fields. Some of the awards and commendations offered include the Prime Minister's Award, created by Eisaku Satō in 1966, and the People's Honour Award, created by Takeo Fukuda in 1977. Additionally, the PM also presents the Prime Minister's Trophy on behalf of the Japan Professional Sports Association and the Monodzukuri Nippon award on behalf of the Japanese Manufacturing Association.

== See also ==
- Air transports of heads of state and government
- List of spouses of prime ministers of Japan
- Official state car

== Bibliography ==
- Kenkyusha's New Japanese-English Dictionary. Tokyo: Kenkyusha Limited. 1991. ISBN 4-7674-2015-6.
