= List of prime ministers of Japan =

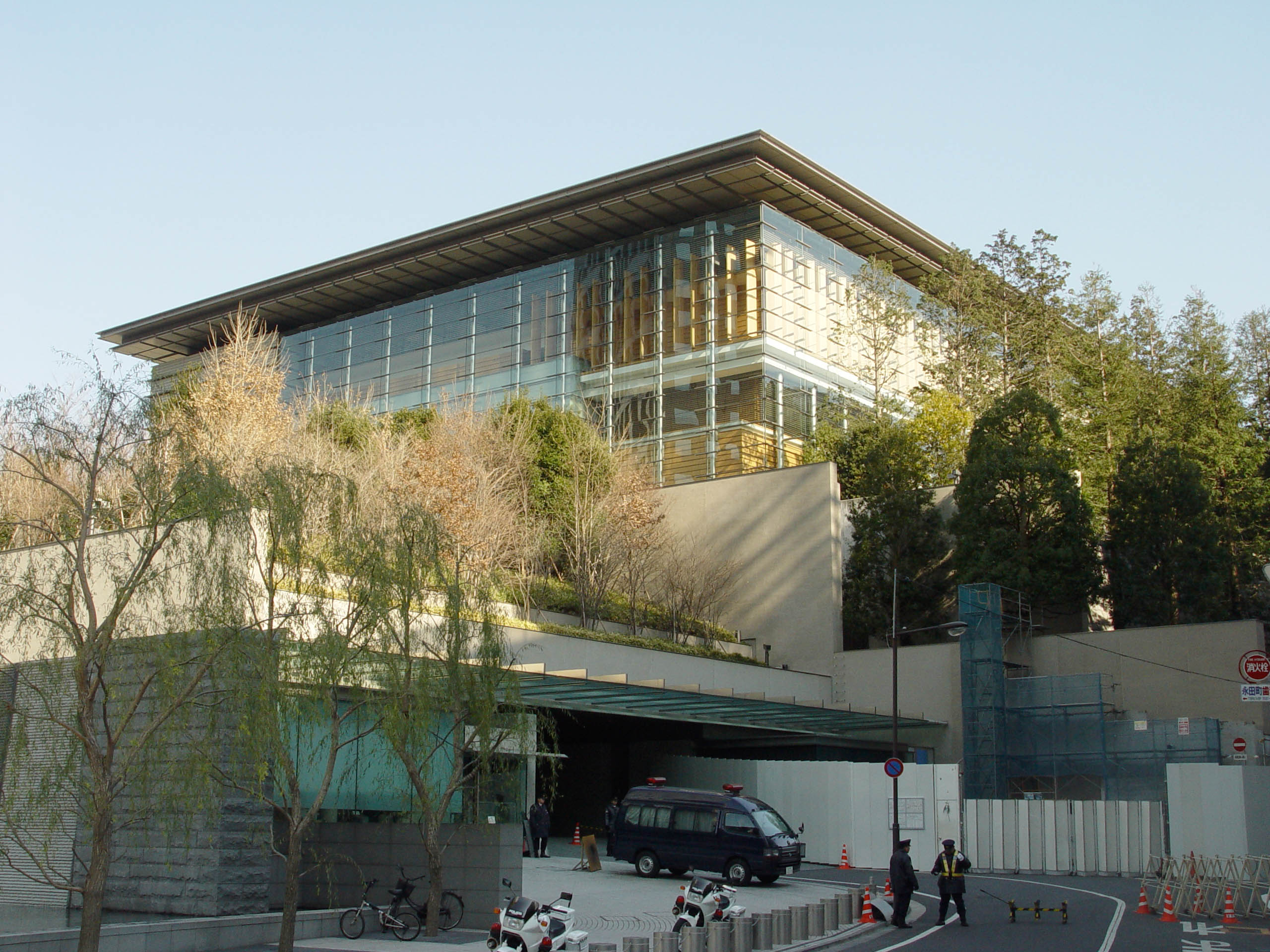
The west facade of the Naikaku Sōri Daijin Kantei (valley side), the office of the prime minister

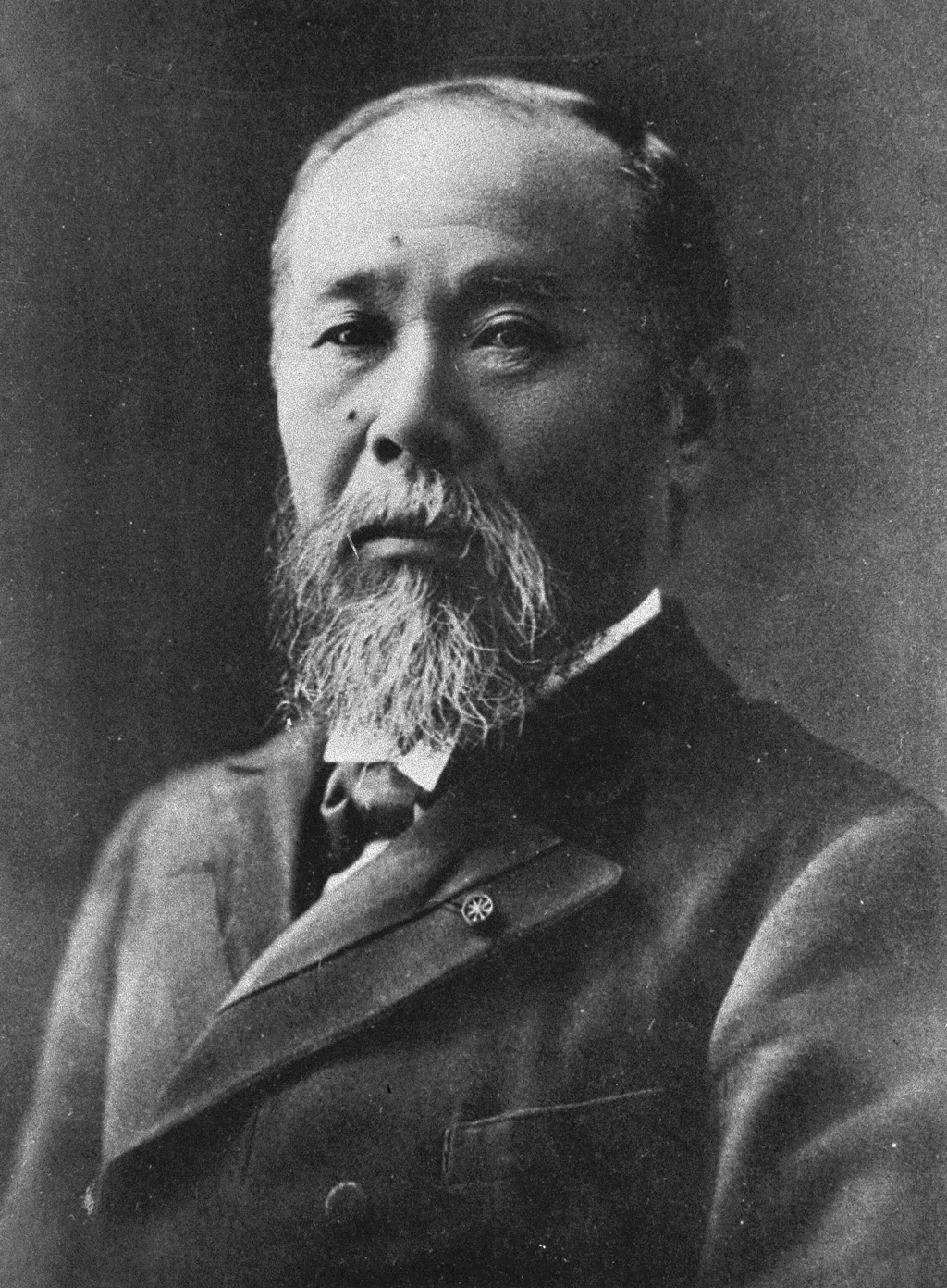
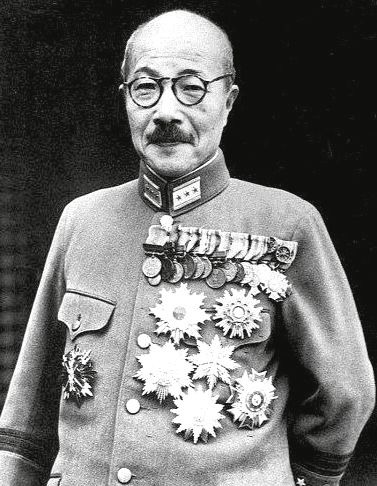
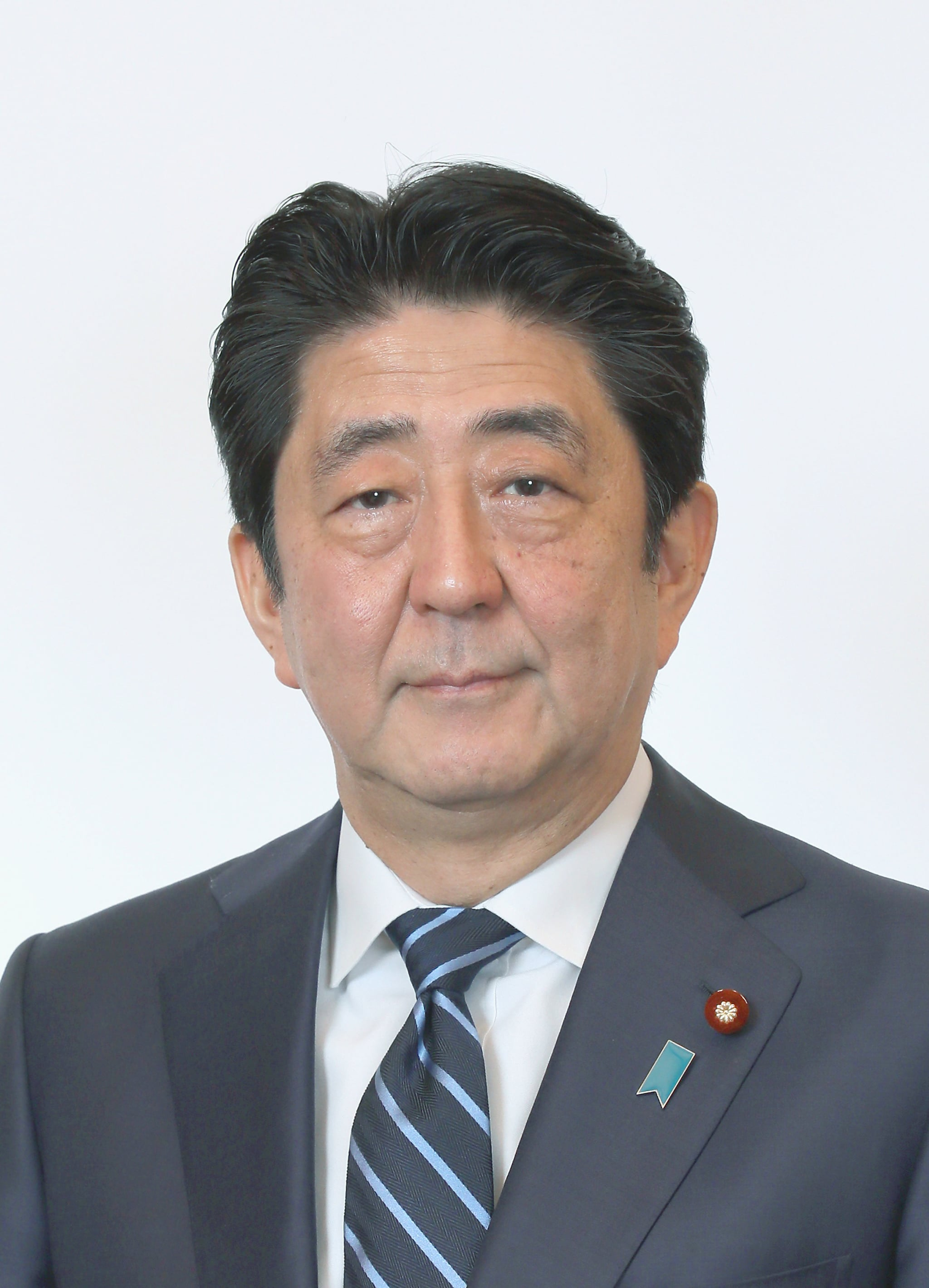
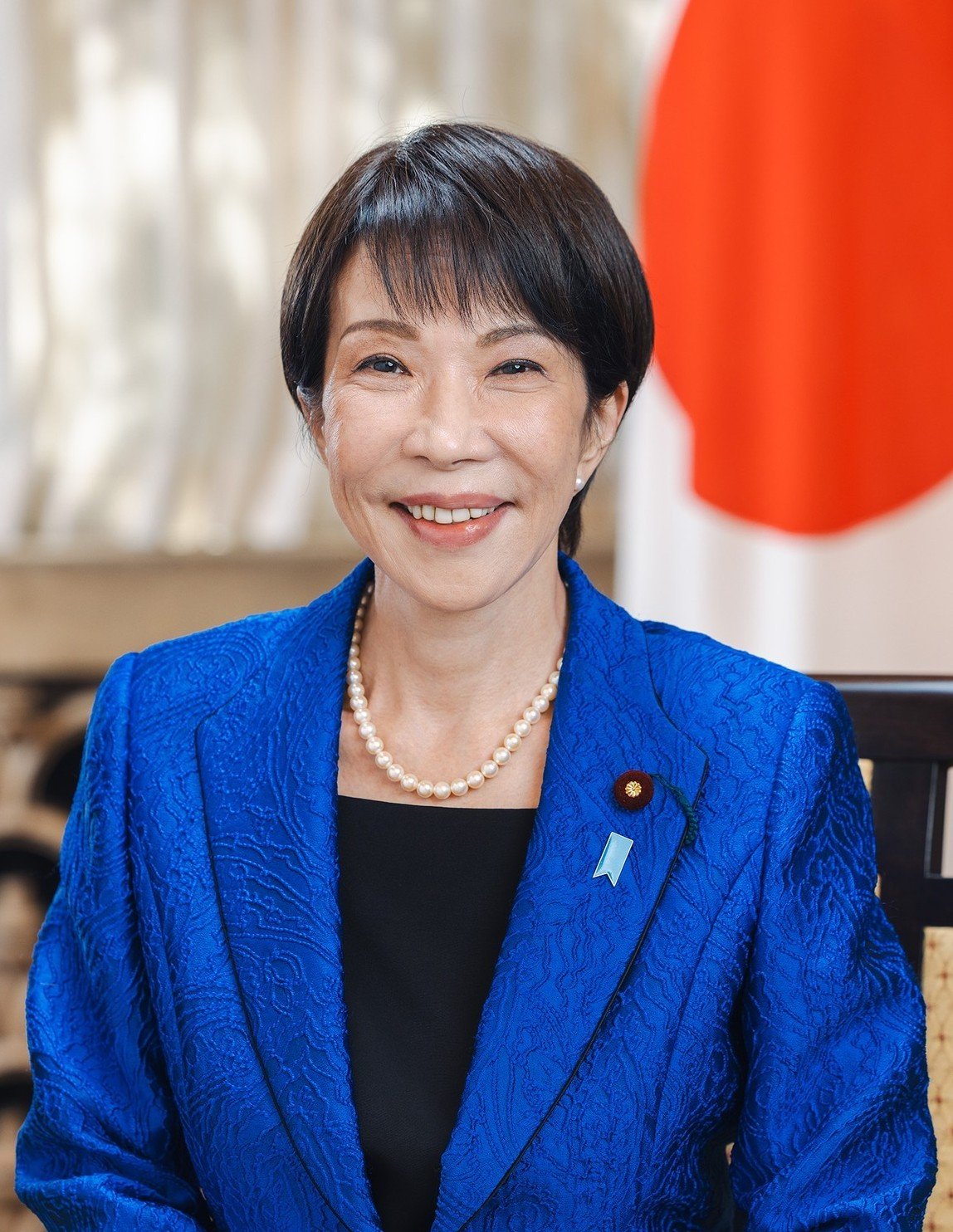
- Itō Hirobumi (top left) is considered the first prime minister of Japan.
- Hideki Tojo (top right) was prime minister during much of World War II.
- Shinzo Abe (bottom left) was the longest-serving prime minister in Japanese history.
- Sanae Takaichi (bottom right) is the first female and incumbent prime minister of Japan.

The prime minister of Japan is the country's head of government and the leader of the Cabinet. This is a list of prime ministers of Japan, from when the first Japanese prime minister (in the modern sense), Itō Hirobumi, took office in 1885, until the present day. 32 prime ministers under the Meiji Constitution had a mandate from the Emperor. The "electoral mandates" shown are for the House of Representatives, the lower house of the Imperial Diet, which was not constitutionally guaranteed to have any influence on the appointment of the prime minister.

The prime minister under the Constitution of Japan is designated from among the members of the National Diet, and appointed by the Emperor after being nominated by the National Diet. The premiership of Prince Naruhiko Higashikuni, who was prime minister for fifty-four days in 1945, was the shortest in Japanese history. Shinzo Abe served the longest, with eight years over two non-consecutive periods. The incumbent and first female prime minister is Sanae Takaichi, who assumed the office on 21 October 2025.

== From 1871 to 1885 ==
The office of daijō-daijin (太政大臣, chancellor of the realm) was the equivalent of what would become the office of prime minister. It was an ancient role which had been discontinued in the 18th century and was briefly revived during the Meiji era.

=== Daijō-daijin (chancellor of the realm) ===
List of daijō-daijin (chancellor of the realm) (1871–1885)
Portrait	Daijō-daijin Office (Lifespan)	Term of office			Mandate	Party	Government	Emperor Reign
Portrait	Daijō-daijin Office (Lifespan)	Start	End	Duration	Mandate	Party	Government	Emperor Reign
photograph	Prince; Sanjō Sanetomi 三條 實美 (1837–1891)	13 September 1871	22 December 1885	14 years, 101 days	—	Independent		Meiji r. 1867–1912 (Meiji era)

The office of Daijō-daijin was abolished in December 1885 with the appointment of Itō Hirobumi in the new position of prime minister of Japan (内閣総理大臣, Naikaku Sōri-Daijin).

== Since 1885 ==
=== Prime ministers ===
  - 19th century
  - 20th century
  - 21st century
  - Meiji
  - Taishō
  - Shōwa
  - Heisei
  - Reiwa
  - Nonpartisan (9)
  - Military (11) – Army (6) / Navy (5)
  - Kenseitō (1)
  - Rikken Seiyūkai (6)
  - Rikken Dōshikai (1)
  - Kenseikai (2)
  - Rikken Minseitō (2)
  - Taisei Yokusankai (4)
  - Imperial Family (1)
  - Liberal (1945–1948) (1)
  - Socialist (2)
  - Democratic (1947–1950) (1)
  - Democratic Liberal (1)
  - Liberal (1950–1955) (1)
  - Democratic (1954–1955) (1)
  - Liberal Democratic (26)
  - New (1)
  - Renewal (1)
  - Democratic (1998–2016) (3)

List of prime ministers of Japan since 1885
Portrait	Prime minister Office (Lifespan)	Term of office			Mandate	Party	Government	Emperor Reign	Ref
Portrait	Prime minister Office (Lifespan)	Start	End	Duration	Mandate	Party	Government	Emperor Reign	Ref
photograph	Count; Itō Hirobumi 伊藤󠄃 博文 (1841–1909)	22 December 1885	30 April 1888	2 years, 131 days	—	Independent (Meiji oligarchy)	1. Itō I	Meiji r. 1867–1912 (Meiji era)	
photograph	Count; Kuroda Kiyotaka 黑田 清隆 (1840–1900)	30 April 1888	25 October 1889	1 year, 179 days	—	Military (Army)	2. Kuroda	Meiji r. 1867–1912 (Meiji era)	
photograph	Prince; Sanjō Sanetomi 三條 實美 (1837–1891); Acting Prime Minister	25 October 1889	24 December 1889	61 days	—	Independent	Sanjō caretaker	Meiji r. 1867–1912 (Meiji era)	
photograph	Count; Yamagata Aritomo 山縣 有朋 (1838–1922)	24 December 1889	6 May 1891	1 year, 134 days	—	Military (Army)	3. Yamagata I	Meiji r. 1867–1912 (Meiji era)	
photograph	Count; Yamagata Aritomo 山縣 有朋 (1838–1922)	24 December 1889	6 May 1891	1 year, 134 days	1890	Military (Army)	3. Yamagata I	Meiji r. 1867–1912 (Meiji era)	
photograph	Count; Matsukata Masayoshi 松方 正義 (1835–1924)	6 May 1891	8 August 1892	1 year, 95 days	—	Independent (Meiji oligarchy)	4. Matsukata I	Meiji r. 1867–1912 (Meiji era)	
photograph	Count; Matsukata Masayoshi 松方 正義 (1835–1924)	6 May 1891	8 August 1892	1 year, 95 days	1892	Independent (Meiji oligarchy)	4. Matsukata I	Meiji r. 1867–1912 (Meiji era)	
photograph	Marquess; Itō Hirobumi 伊藤󠄃 博文 (1841–1909)	8 August 1892	31 August 1896	4 years, 24 days	—	Independent (Meiji oligarchy)	5. Itō II	Meiji r. 1867–1912 (Meiji era)	
photograph	Marquess; Itō Hirobumi 伊藤󠄃 博文 (1841–1909)	8 August 1892	31 August 1896	4 years, 24 days	^{Mar.}1894	Independent (Meiji oligarchy)	5. Itō II	Meiji r. 1867–1912 (Meiji era)	
photograph	Marquess; Itō Hirobumi 伊藤󠄃 博文 (1841–1909)	8 August 1892	31 August 1896	4 years, 24 days	^{Sep.}1894	Independent (Meiji oligarchy)	5. Itō II	Meiji r. 1867–1912 (Meiji era)	
photograph	Count; Kuroda Kiyotaka 黑田 清隆 (1840–1900); Acting Prime Minister	31 August 1896	18 September 1896	19 days	—	Military (Army)	5. Itō II	Meiji r. 1867–1912 (Meiji era)	
photograph	Count; Matsukata Masayoshi 松方 正義 (1835–1924)	18 September 1896	12 January 1898	1 year, 117 days	—	Independent (Meiji oligarchy)	6. Matsukata II	Meiji r. 1867–1912 (Meiji era)	
photograph	Marquess; Itō Hirobumi 伊藤󠄃 博文 (1841–1909)	12 January 1898	30 June 1898	170 days	—	Independent (Meiji oligarchy)	7. Itō III	Meiji r. 1867–1912 (Meiji era)	
photograph	Marquess; Itō Hirobumi 伊藤󠄃 博文 (1841–1909)	12 January 1898	30 June 1898	170 days	^{Mar.}1898	Independent (Meiji oligarchy)	7. Itō III	Meiji r. 1867–1912 (Meiji era)	
photograph	Count; Ōkuma Shigenobu 大隈 重信 (1838–1922)	30 June 1898	8 November 1898	132 days	—	Kenseitō	8. Ōkuma I	Meiji r. 1867–1912 (Meiji era)	
photograph	Count; Ōkuma Shigenobu 大隈 重信 (1838–1922)	30 June 1898	8 November 1898	132 days	^{Aug.}1898	Kenseitō	8. Ōkuma I	Meiji r. 1867–1912 (Meiji era)	
photograph	Count; Yamagata Aritomo 山縣 有朋 (1838–1922)	8 November 1898	19 October 1900	1 year, 346 days	—	Military (Army)	9. Yamagata II	Meiji r. 1867–1912 (Meiji era)	
photograph	Marquess; Itō Hirobumi 伊藤󠄃 博文 (1841–1909)	19 October 1900	10 May 1901	204 days	—	Rikken Seiyūkai	10. Itō IV	Meiji r. 1867–1912 (Meiji era)	
photograph	Marquess; Saionji Kinmochi 西園寺 公望 (1849–1940); Acting Prime Minister	10 May 1901	2 June 1901	24 days	—	Rikken Seiyūkai	10. Itō IV	Meiji r. 1867–1912 (Meiji era)	
photograph	Count; Katsura Tarō 桂 太郞 (1848–1913)	2 June 1901	7 January 1906	4 years, 220 days	—	Military (Army)	11. Katsura I	Meiji r. 1867–1912 (Meiji era)	
photograph	Count; Katsura Tarō 桂 太郞 (1848–1913)	2 June 1901	7 January 1906	4 years, 220 days	1902	Military (Army)	11. Katsura I	Meiji r. 1867–1912 (Meiji era)	
photograph	Count; Katsura Tarō 桂 太郞 (1848–1913)	2 June 1901	7 January 1906	4 years, 220 days	1903	Military (Army)	11. Katsura I	Meiji r. 1867–1912 (Meiji era)	
photograph	Count; Katsura Tarō 桂 太郞 (1848–1913)	2 June 1901	7 January 1906	4 years, 220 days	1904	Military (Army)	11. Katsura I	Meiji r. 1867–1912 (Meiji era)	
photograph	Marquess; Saionji Kinmochi 西園寺 公望 (1849–1940)	7 January 1906	14 July 1908	2 years, 190 days	—	Rikken Seiyūkai	12. Saionji I	Meiji r. 1867–1912 (Meiji era)	
photograph	Marquess; Saionji Kinmochi 西園寺 公望 (1849–1940)	7 January 1906	14 July 1908	2 years, 190 days	1908	Rikken Seiyūkai	12. Saionji I	Meiji r. 1867–1912 (Meiji era)	
photograph	Prince; Katsura Tarō 桂 太郞 (1848–1913)	14 July 1908	30 August 1911	3 years, 48 days	—	Military (Army)	13. Katsura II	Meiji r. 1867–1912 (Meiji era)	
photograph	Marquess; Saionji Kinmochi 西園寺 公望 (1849–1940)	30 August 1911	21 December 1912	1 year, 114 days	—	Rikken Seiyūkai	14. Saionji II	Meiji r. 1867–1912 (Meiji era)	
photograph	Marquess; Saionji Kinmochi 西園寺 公望 (1849–1940)	30 August 1911	21 December 1912	1 year, 114 days	1912	Rikken Seiyūkai	14. Saionji II	Meiji r. 1867–1912 (Meiji era)	
photograph	Marquess; Saionji Kinmochi 西園寺 公望 (1849–1940)	30 August 1911	21 December 1912	1 year, 114 days	1912	Rikken Seiyūkai	14. Saionji II	Taishō r. 1912–1926 (Taishō era)	
photograph	Prince; Katsura Tarō 桂 太郞 (1848–1913)	21 December 1912	20 February 1913	62 days	—	Independent	15. Katsura III	Taishō r. 1912–1926 (Taishō era)	
photograph	Count; Yamamoto Gonnohyōe 山本 權兵衛 (1852–1933)	20 February 1913	16 April 1914	1 year, 56 days	—	Military (Navy)	16. Yamamoto I	Taishō r. 1912–1926 (Taishō era)	
photograph	Marquess; Ōkuma Shigenobu 大隈 重信 (1838–1922)	16 April 1914	9 October 1916	2 years, 177 days	—	Rikken Dōshikai	17. Ōkuma II	Taishō r. 1912–1926 (Taishō era)	
photograph	Marquess; Ōkuma Shigenobu 大隈 重信 (1838–1922)	16 April 1914	9 October 1916	2 years, 177 days	1915	Rikken Dōshikai	17. Ōkuma II	Taishō r. 1912–1926 (Taishō era)	
photograph	Count; Terauchi Masatake 寺內 正毅 (1852–1919)	9 October 1916	29 September 1918	1 year, 356 days	—	Military (Army)	18. Terauchi	Taishō r. 1912–1926 (Taishō era)	
photograph	Count; Terauchi Masatake 寺內 正毅 (1852–1919)	9 October 1916	29 September 1918	1 year, 356 days	1917	Military (Army)	18. Terauchi	Taishō r. 1912–1926 (Taishō era)	
photograph	Hara Takashi 原 敬 Rep for Morioka (1856–1921)	29 September 1918	4 November 1921	3 years, 37 days (Note: Died in office)	—	Rikken Seiyūkai	19. Hara	Taishō r. 1912–1926 (Taishō era)	
photograph	Hara Takashi 原 敬 Rep for Morioka (1856–1921)	29 September 1918	4 November 1921	3 years, 37 days	1920	Rikken Seiyūkai	19. Hara	Taishō r. 1912–1926 (Taishō era)	
photograph	Count; Uchida Kōsai 內田 康哉 (1865–1936); Acting Prime Minister	4 November 1921	13 November 1921	10 days	—	Independent	19. Hara	Taishō r. 1912–1926 (Taishō era)	
photograph	Viscount; Takahashi Korekiyo 高橋 是清 (1854–1936)	13 November 1921	12 June 1922	212 days	—	Rikken Seiyūkai	20. Takahashi	Taishō r. 1912–1926 (Taishō era)	
photograph	Baron; Katō Tomosaburō 加藤 友三郞 (1861–1923)	12 June 1922	24 August 1923	1 year, 74 days	—	Military (Navy)	21. Katō To.	Taishō r. 1912–1926 (Taishō era)	
photograph	Count; Uchida Kōsai 內田 康哉 (1865–1936); Acting Prime Minister	24 August 1923	2 September 1923	10 days	—	Independent	21. Katō To.	Taishō r. 1912–1926 (Taishō era)	
photograph	Count; Yamamoto Gonnohyōe 山本 權兵衛 (1852–1933)	2 September 1923	7 January 1924	128 days	—	Military (Navy)	22. Yamamoto II	Taishō r. 1912–1926 (Taishō era)	
photograph	Viscount; Kiyoura Keigo 清浦 奎吾 (1850–1942)	7 January 1924	11 June 1924	157 days	—	Independent	23. Kiyoura	Taishō r. 1912–1926 (Taishō era)	
photograph	Viscount; Katō Takaaki 加藤 高明 (1860–1926)	11 June 1924	28 January 1926	1 year, 232 days	1924	Kenseikai	24. Katō Ta.	Taishō r. 1912–1926 (Taishō era)	
photograph	Wakatsuki Reijirō (Note: Wakatsuki Reijirō was Acting Prime Minister from 28 until 30 January 1926.) 若槻 禮次郞 (1866–1949)	28 January 1926	30 January 1926	3 days	—	Kenseikai	24. Katō Ta.	Taishō r. 1912–1926 (Taishō era)	
photograph	Wakatsuki Reijirō 若槻 禮次郞 (1866–1949)	30 January 1926	20 April 1927	1 year, 81 days	—	Kenseikai	25. Wakatsuki I	Taishō r. 1912–1926 (Taishō era)	
photograph	Wakatsuki Reijirō 若槻 禮次郞 (1866–1949)	30 January 1926	20 April 1927	1 year, 81 days	—	Kenseikai	25. Wakatsuki I	Shōwa r. 1926–1989 (Shōwa era)	
photograph	Baron; Tanaka Giichi 田中 義一 (1864–1929)	20 April 1927	2 July 1929	2 years, 74 days	—	Rikken Seiyūkai	26. Tanaka G.	Shōwa r. 1926–1989 (Shōwa era)	
photograph	Baron; Tanaka Giichi 田中 義一 (1864–1929)	20 April 1927	2 July 1929	2 years, 74 days	1928	Rikken Seiyūkai	26. Tanaka G.	Shōwa r. 1926–1989 (Shōwa era)	
photograph	Hamaguchi Osachi 濱口 雄幸; Rep for Kochi 2nd (1870–1931)	2 July 1929	14 April 1931	1 year, 287 days	—	Rikken Minseitō	27. Hamaguchi	Shōwa r. 1926–1989 (Shōwa era)	
photograph	Hamaguchi Osachi 濱口 雄幸; Rep for Kochi 2nd (1870–1931)	2 July 1929	14 April 1931	1 year, 287 days	1930	Rikken Minseitō	27. Hamaguchi	Shōwa r. 1926–1989 (Shōwa era)	
	Baron; Kijūrō Shidehara 幣原 喜重郞 (1872–1951); Acting Prime Minister	14 November 1930	9 March 1931	116 days	—	Independent	27. Hamaguchi	Shōwa r. 1926–1989 (Shōwa era)	
photograph	Baron; Wakatsuki Reijirō 若槻 禮次郞 (1866–1949)	14 April 1931	13 December 1931	244 days	—	Rikken Minseitō	28. Wakatsuki II	Shōwa r. 1926–1989 (Shōwa era)	
photograph	Inukai Tsuyoshi 犬養 毅 Rep for Okayama 2nd (1855–1932)	13 December 1931	15 May 1932	155 days	—	Rikken Seiyūkai	29. Inukai	Shōwa r. 1926–1989 (Shōwa era)	
photograph	Inukai Tsuyoshi 犬養 毅 Rep for Okayama 2nd (1855–1932)	13 December 1931	15 May 1932	155 days	1932	Rikken Seiyūkai	29. Inukai	Shōwa r. 1926–1989 (Shōwa era)	
photograph	Viscount; Takahashi Korekiyo 高橋 是清 (1854–1936)	15 May 1932	26 May 1932	12 days	—	Rikken Seiyūkai	29. Inukai	Shōwa r. 1926–1989 (Shōwa era)	
photograph	Viscount; Saitō Makoto 齋藤 實 (1858–1936)	26 May 1932	8 July 1934	2 years, 44 days	—	Military (Navy)	30. Saitō	Shōwa r. 1926–1989 (Shōwa era)	
photograph	Okada Keisuke 岡田 啓介 (1868–1952)	8 July 1934	9 March 1936	1 year, 246 days	—	Military (Navy)	31. Okada	Shōwa r. 1926–1989 (Shōwa era)	
photograph	Okada Keisuke 岡田 啓介 (1868–1952)	8 July 1934	9 March 1936	1 year, 246 days	1936	Military (Navy)	31. Okada	Shōwa r. 1926–1989 (Shōwa era)	
photograph	Fumio Gotō 後藤 文夫 (1884–1980); Acting Prime Minister	26 February 1936	29 February 1936	4 days	—	Independent	31. Okada	Shōwa r. 1926–1989 (Shōwa era)	
photograph	Kōki Hirota 廣田 弘毅 (1878–1948)	9 March 1936	2 February 1937	331 days	—	Independent	32. Hirota	Shōwa r. 1926–1989 (Shōwa era)	
	Senjūrō Hayashi 林 銑十郞 (1876–1943)	2 February 1937	4 June 1937	123 days	—	Military (Army)	33. Hayashi	Shōwa r. 1926–1989 (Shōwa era)	
	Senjūrō Hayashi 林 銑十郞 (1876–1943)	2 February 1937	4 June 1937	123 days	1937	Military (Army)	33. Hayashi	Shōwa r. 1926–1989 (Shōwa era)	
photograph	Prince; Fumimaro Konoe 近衞 文麿󠄁 (1891–1945)	4 June 1937	5 January 1939	1 year, 216 days	—	Independent	34. Konoe I	Shōwa r. 1926–1989 (Shōwa era)	
photograph	Baron; Kiichirō Hiranuma 平󠄁沼 騏一郞 (1867–1952)	5 January 1939	30 August 1939	238 days	—	Independent	35. Hiranuma	Shōwa r. 1926–1989 (Shōwa era)	
photograph	Nobuyuki Abe 阿部 信行 (1875–1953)	30 August 1939	16 January 1940	140 days	—	Military (Army)	36. N. Abe	Shōwa r. 1926–1989 (Shōwa era)	
photograph	Mitsumasa Yonai 米內 光政 (1880–1948)	16 January 1940	22 July 1940	189 days	—	Military (Navy)	37. Yonai	Shōwa r. 1926–1989 (Shōwa era)	
	Prince; Fumimaro Konoe 近衞 文麿󠄁 (1891–1945)	22 July 1940	18 October 1941	1 year, 89 days	—	Independent	38. Konoe II	Shōwa r. 1926–1989 (Shōwa era)	
	Prince; Fumimaro Konoe 近衞 文麿󠄁 (1891–1945)	22 July 1940	18 October 1941	1 year, 89 days	—	Taisei Yokusankai	38. Konoe II	Shōwa r. 1926–1989 (Shōwa era)	
	Prince; Fumimaro Konoe 近衞 文麿󠄁 (1891–1945)	22 July 1940	18 October 1941	1 year, 89 days	—	Taisei Yokusankai	39. Konoe III	Shōwa r. 1926–1989 (Shōwa era)	
photograph	Hideki Tojo 東條 英機 (1884–1948)	18 October 1941	22 July 1944	2 years, 279 days	1942	Taisei Yokusankai	40. Tōjō	Shōwa r. 1926–1989 (Shōwa era)	
photograph	Kuniaki Koiso 小磯 國昭 (1880–1950)	22 July 1944	7 April 1945	260 days	—	Taisei Yokusankai	41. Koiso	Shōwa r. 1926–1989 (Shōwa era)	
photograph	Baron; Kantarō Suzuki 鈴木 貫太郞 (1868–1948)	7 April 1945	17 August 1945	133 days	—	Taisei Yokusankai	42. K. Suzuki	Shōwa r. 1926–1989 (Shōwa era)	
photograph	Baron; Kantarō Suzuki 鈴木 貫太郞 (1868–1948)	7 April 1945	17 August 1945	133 days	—	Independent	42. K. Suzuki	Shōwa r. 1926–1989 (Shōwa era)	
	Prince; Naruhiko Higashikuni 東久邇宮稔彦王 (1887–1990)	17 August 1945	9 October 1945	54 days	—	Imperial Family	43. Higashikuni	Shōwa r. 1926–1989 (Shōwa era)	
	Baron; Kijūrō Shidehara 幣原 喜重郞 (1872–1951)	9 October 1945	22 May 1946	226 days	—	Independent	44. Shidehara	Shōwa r. 1926–1989 (Shōwa era)	
	Shigeru Yoshida 吉田 茂 (1878–1967)	22 May 1946	24 May 1947	1 year, 3 days	1946	Liberal	45. Yoshida I	Shōwa r. 1926–1989 (Shōwa era)	
photograph	Tetsu Katayama 片山 哲 Rep for Kanagawa 3rd (1887–1978)	24 May 1947	10 March 1948	292 days	1947	Socialist	46. Katayama	Shōwa r. 1926–1989 (Shōwa era)	
photograph	Hitoshi Ashida 蘆田 均 Rep for Kyōto 2nd (1887–1959)	10 March 1948	15 October 1948	220 days	—	Democratic	47. Ashida	Shōwa r. 1926–1989 (Shōwa era)	
	Shigeru Yoshida 吉田 茂 Rep for Kōchi at-large (1878–1967)	15 October 1948	10 December 1954	6 years, 57 days	—	Democratic Liberal	48. Yoshida II	Shōwa r. 1926–1989 (Shōwa era)	
	Shigeru Yoshida 吉田 茂 Rep for Kōchi at-large (1878–1967)	15 October 1948	10 December 1954	6 years, 57 days	1949	Democratic Liberal	49. Yoshida III	Shōwa r. 1926–1989 (Shōwa era)	
	Shigeru Yoshida 吉田 茂 Rep for Kōchi at-large (1878–1967)	15 October 1948	10 December 1954	6 years, 57 days	1949	Liberal	49. Yoshida III	Shōwa r. 1926–1989 (Shōwa era)	
	Shigeru Yoshida 吉田 茂 Rep for Kōchi at-large (1878–1967)	15 October 1948	10 December 1954	6 years, 57 days	1952	Liberal	50. Yoshida IV	Shōwa r. 1926–1989 (Shōwa era)	
	Shigeru Yoshida 吉田 茂 Rep for Kōchi at-large (1878–1967)	15 October 1948	10 December 1954	6 years, 57 days	1953	Liberal	51. Yoshida V	Shōwa r. 1926–1989 (Shōwa era)	
	Ichirō Hatoyama 鳩山 一郞; Rep for Tokyo 1st (1883–1959)	10 December 1954	23 December 1956	2 years, 14 days	—	Japan Democratic	52. Hatoyama I. I	Shōwa r. 1926–1989 (Shōwa era)	
	Ichirō Hatoyama 鳩山 一郞; Rep for Tokyo 1st (1883–1959)	10 December 1954	23 December 1956	2 years, 14 days	1955	Japan Democratic	53. Hatoyama I. II	Shōwa r. 1926–1989 (Shōwa era)	
	Ichirō Hatoyama 鳩山 一郞; Rep for Tokyo 1st (1883–1959)	10 December 1954	23 December 1956	2 years, 14 days	—	Liberal Democratic	54. Hatoyama I. III	Shōwa r. 1926–1989 (Shōwa era)	
photograph	Tanzan Ishibashi 石橋 湛山; Rep for Shizuoka 2nd (1884–1973)	23 December 1956	25 February 1957	65 days	—	Liberal Democratic	55. Ishibashi	Shōwa r. 1926–1989 (Shōwa era)	
photograph	Nobusuke Kishi 岸 信介; Rep for Yamaguchi 2nd (1896–1987)	25 February 1957	19 July 1960	3 years, 146 days	—	Liberal Democratic	56. Kishi I	Shōwa r. 1926–1989 (Shōwa era)	
photograph	Nobusuke Kishi 岸 信介; Rep for Yamaguchi 2nd (1896–1987)	25 February 1957	19 July 1960	3 years, 146 days	1958	Liberal Democratic	57. Kishi II	Shōwa r. 1926–1989 (Shōwa era)	
photograph	Hayato Ikeda 池田 勇人; Rep for Hiroshima 2nd (1899–1965)	19 July 1960	9 November 1964	4 years, 114 days	—	Liberal Democratic	58. Ikeda I	Shōwa r. 1926–1989 (Shōwa era)	
photograph	Hayato Ikeda 池田 勇人; Rep for Hiroshima 2nd (1899–1965)	19 July 1960	9 November 1964	4 years, 114 days	1960	Liberal Democratic	59. Ikeda II	Shōwa r. 1926–1989 (Shōwa era)	
photograph	Hayato Ikeda 池田 勇人; Rep for Hiroshima 2nd (1899–1965)	19 July 1960	9 November 1964	4 years, 114 days	1963	Liberal Democratic	60. Ikeda III	Shōwa r. 1926–1989 (Shōwa era)	
photograph	Eisaku Satō 佐藤 榮作; Rep for Yamaguchi 2nd (1901–1975)	9 November 1964	7 July 1972	7 years, 242 days	—	Liberal Democratic	61. Satō I	Shōwa r. 1926–1989 (Shōwa era)	
photograph	Eisaku Satō 佐藤 榮作; Rep for Yamaguchi 2nd (1901–1975)	9 November 1964	7 July 1972	7 years, 242 days	1967	Liberal Democratic	62. Satō II	Shōwa r. 1926–1989 (Shōwa era)	
photograph	Eisaku Satō 佐藤 榮作; Rep for Yamaguchi 2nd (1901–1975)	9 November 1964	7 July 1972	7 years, 242 days	1969	Liberal Democratic	63. Satō III	Shōwa r. 1926–1989 (Shōwa era)	
	Kakuei Tanaka 田中 角榮; Rep for Niigata 3rd (1918–1993)	7 July 1972	9 December 1974	2 years, 156 days	—	Liberal Democratic	64. Tanaka K. I	Shōwa r. 1926–1989 (Shōwa era)	
	Kakuei Tanaka 田中 角榮; Rep for Niigata 3rd (1918–1993)	7 July 1972	9 December 1974	2 years, 156 days	1972	Liberal Democratic	65. Tanaka K. II	Shōwa r. 1926–1989 (Shōwa era)	
	Takeo Miki 三木 武夫; Rep for Tokushima at-large (1907–1988)	9 December 1974	24 December 1976	2 years, 16 days	—	Liberal Democratic	66. Miki	Shōwa r. 1926–1989 (Shōwa era)	
	Takeo Fukuda 福︀田 赳夫; Rep for Gunma 3rd (1905–1995)	24 December 1976	7 December 1978	1 year, 349 days	1976	Liberal Democratic	67. Fukuda T.	Shōwa r. 1926–1989 (Shōwa era)	
photograph	Masayoshi Ōhira 大平󠄁 正芳; Rep for Kagawa 2nd (1910–1980)	7 December 1978	12 June 1980	1 year, 189 days	—	Liberal Democratic	68. Ōhira I	Shōwa r. 1926–1989 (Shōwa era)	
photograph	Masayoshi Ōhira 大平󠄁 正芳; Rep for Kagawa 2nd (1910–1980)	7 December 1978	12 June 1980	1 year, 189 days	1979	Liberal Democratic	69. Ōhira II	Shōwa r. 1926–1989 (Shōwa era)	
photograph	Masayoshi Ito 伊東 正義; Rep for Fukushima 2nd (1913–1994); Acting Prime Minister	12 June 1980	17 July 1980	36 days	—	Liberal Democratic	69. Ōhira II	Shōwa r. 1926–1989 (Shōwa era)	
photograph	Zenkō Suzuki 鈴木 善幸; Rep for Iwate 1st (1911–2004)	17 July 1980	27 November 1982	2 years, 134 days	1980	Liberal Democratic	70. Suzuki Z.	Shōwa r. 1926–1989 (Shōwa era)	
	Yasuhiro Nakasone 中曾根 康弘; Rep for Gunma 3rd (1918–2019)	27 November 1982	6 November 1987	4 years, 345 days	—	Liberal Democratic	71. Nakasone I	Shōwa r. 1926–1989 (Shōwa era)	
	Yasuhiro Nakasone 中曾根 康弘; Rep for Gunma 3rd (1918–2019)	27 November 1982	6 November 1987	4 years, 345 days	1983	Liberal Democratic	72. Nakasone II	Shōwa r. 1926–1989 (Shōwa era)	
	Yasuhiro Nakasone 中曾根 康弘; Rep for Gunma 3rd (1918–2019)	27 November 1982	6 November 1987	4 years, 345 days	1986	Liberal Democratic	73. Nakasone III	Shōwa r. 1926–1989 (Shōwa era)	
	Noboru Takeshita 竹下 登 Rep for Shimane at-large (1924–2000)	6 November 1987	3 June 1989	1 year, 210 days	—	Liberal Democratic	74. Takeshita	Shōwa r. 1926–1989 (Shōwa era)	
	Noboru Takeshita 竹下 登 Rep for Shimane at-large (1924–2000)	6 November 1987	3 June 1989	1 year, 210 days	—	Liberal Democratic	74. Takeshita	Akihito (Heisei) r. 1989–2019 (Heisei era)	
	Sōsuke Uno 宇野 宗佑; Rep for Shiga at-large (1922–1998)	3 June 1989	10 August 1989	69 days	—	Liberal Democratic	75. Uno	Akihito (Heisei) r. 1989–2019 (Heisei era)	
	Toshiki Kaifu 海︀部 俊樹; Rep for Aichi 3rd (1931–2022)	10 August 1989	5 November 1991	2 years, 88 days	—	Liberal Democratic	76. Kaifu I	Akihito (Heisei) r. 1989–2019 (Heisei era)	
	Toshiki Kaifu 海︀部 俊樹; Rep for Aichi 3rd (1931–2022)	10 August 1989	5 November 1991	2 years, 88 days	1990	Liberal Democratic	77. Kaifu II	Akihito (Heisei) r. 1989–2019 (Heisei era)	
photograph	Kiichi Miyazawa 宮澤 喜一; Rep for Hiroshima 3rd (1919–2007)	5 November 1991	9 August 1993	1 year, 278 days	—	Liberal Democratic	78. Miyazawa	Akihito (Heisei) r. 1989–2019 (Heisei era)	
photograph	Morihiro Hosokawa 細川 護熙; Rep for Kumamoto 1st (born 1938)	9 August 1993	28 April 1994	263 days	1993	New	79. Hosokawa	Akihito (Heisei) r. 1989–2019 (Heisei era)	
photograph	Tsutomu Hata 羽︀田 孜 Rep for Nagano 2nd (1935–2017)	28 April 1994	30 June 1994	64 days	—	Renewal	80. Hata	Akihito (Heisei) r. 1989–2019 (Heisei era)	
photograph	Tomiichi Murayama 村山 富市; Rep for Ōita 1st (1924–2025)	30 June 1994	11 January 1996	1 year, 196 days	—	Socialist	81. Murayama	Akihito (Heisei) r. 1989–2019 (Heisei era)	
photograph	Ryutaro Hashimoto 橋本 龍太郞; Rep for Okayama 4th (1937–2006)	11 January 1996	30 July 1998	2 years, 201 days	—	Liberal Democratic	82. Hashimoto I	Akihito (Heisei) r. 1989–2019 (Heisei era)	
photograph	Ryutaro Hashimoto 橋本 龍太郞; Rep for Okayama 4th (1937–2006)	11 January 1996	30 July 1998	2 years, 201 days	1996	Liberal Democratic	83. Hashimoto II	Akihito (Heisei) r. 1989–2019 (Heisei era)	
	Keizō Obuchi 小渕 惠三; Rep for Gunma 5th (1937–2000)	30 July 1998	3 April 2000	1 year, 251 days	—	Liberal Democratic	84. Obuchi	Akihito (Heisei) r. 1989–2019 (Heisei era)	
	Mikio Aoki 靑木 幹雄; Cou for Shimane at-large (1934–2023); Acting Prime Minister	3 April 2000	5 April 2000	3 days	—	Liberal Democratic	84. Obuchi	Akihito (Heisei) r. 1989–2019 (Heisei era)	
photograph	Yoshirō Mori 森 喜朗; Rep for Ishikawa 2nd (born 1937)	5 April 2000	26 April 2001	1 year, 22 days	—	Liberal Democratic	85. Mori I	Akihito (Heisei) r. 1989–2019 (Heisei era)	
photograph	Yoshirō Mori 森 喜朗; Rep for Ishikawa 2nd (born 1937)	5 April 2000	26 April 2001	1 year, 22 days	2000	Liberal Democratic	86. Mori II	Akihito (Heisei) r. 1989–2019 (Heisei era)	
photograph	Junichiro Koizumi 小泉 純一郞; Rep for Kanagawa 11th (born 1942)	26 April 2001	26 September 2006	5 years, 154 days	—	Liberal Democratic	87. Koizumi I	Akihito (Heisei) r. 1989–2019 (Heisei era)	
photograph	Junichiro Koizumi 小泉 純一郞; Rep for Kanagawa 11th (born 1942)	26 April 2001	26 September 2006	5 years, 154 days	2003	Liberal Democratic	88. Koizumi II	Akihito (Heisei) r. 1989–2019 (Heisei era)	
photograph	Junichiro Koizumi 小泉 純一郞; Rep for Kanagawa 11th (born 1942)	26 April 2001	26 September 2006	5 years, 154 days	2005	Liberal Democratic	89. Koizumi III	Akihito (Heisei) r. 1989–2019 (Heisei era)	
photograph	Shinzo Abe 安倍 晋三; Rep for Yamaguchi 4th (1954–2022) Premiership	26 September 2006	26 September 2007	1 year, 1 day	—	Liberal Democratic	90. Abe S. I	Akihito (Heisei) r. 1989–2019 (Heisei era)	
photograph	Yasuo Fukuda 福︀田 康夫; Rep for Gunma 4th (1936–2026)	26 September 2007	24 September 2008	365 days	—	Liberal Democratic	91. Fukuda Y.	Akihito (Heisei) r. 1989–2019 (Heisei era)	
	Tarō Asō 麻󠄁生 太郞; Rep for Fukuoka 8th (born 1940)	24 September 2008	16 September 2009	358 days	—	Liberal Democratic	92. Asō	Akihito (Heisei) r. 1989–2019 (Heisei era)	
photograph	Yukio Hatoyama 鳩山 由紀夫; Rep for Hokkaido 9th (born 1947) Premiership	16 September 2009	8 June 2010	266 days	2009	Democratic	93. Hatoyama Y.	Akihito (Heisei) r. 1989–2019 (Heisei era)	
	Naoto Kan 菅 直人; Rep for Tokyo 18th (born 1946) Premiership	8 June 2010	2 September 2011	1 year, 87 days	—	Democratic	94. Kan	Akihito (Heisei) r. 1989–2019 (Heisei era)	
	Yoshihiko Noda 野田 佳彦; Rep for Chiba 4th (born 1957) Premiership	2 September 2011	26 December 2012	1 year, 116 days	—	Democratic	95. Noda	Akihito (Heisei) r. 1989–2019 (Heisei era)	
	Shinzo Abe 安倍 晋三; Rep for Yamaguchi 4th (1954–2022) Premiership	26 December 2012	16 September 2020	7 years, 266 days	2012	Liberal Democratic	96. Abe S. II	Akihito (Heisei) r. 1989–2019 (Heisei era)	
	Shinzo Abe 安倍 晋三; Rep for Yamaguchi 4th (1954–2022) Premiership	26 December 2012	16 September 2020	7 years, 266 days	2014	Liberal Democratic	97. Abe S. III	Akihito (Heisei) r. 1989–2019 (Heisei era)	
	Shinzo Abe 安倍 晋三; Rep for Yamaguchi 4th (1954–2022) Premiership	26 December 2012	16 September 2020	7 years, 266 days	2017	Liberal Democratic	98. Abe S. IV	Akihito (Heisei) r. 1989–2019 (Heisei era)	
	Shinzo Abe 安倍 晋三; Rep for Yamaguchi 4th (1954–2022) Premiership	26 December 2012	16 September 2020	7 years, 266 days	2017	Liberal Democratic	98. Abe S. IV	Naruhito (Reiwa) r. 2019–present (Reiwa era)	
photograph	Yoshihide Suga 菅 義偉󠄃 Rep for Kanagawa 2nd (born 1948) Premiership	16 September 2020	4 October 2021	1 year, 19 days	—	Liberal Democratic	99. Suga	Naruhito (Reiwa) r. 2019–present (Reiwa era)	
photograph	Fumio Kishida 岸田 文󠄁雄; Rep for Hiroshima 1st (born 1957) Premiership	4 October 2021	1 October 2024	2 years, 364 days	—	Liberal Democratic	100. Kishida I	Naruhito (Reiwa) r. 2019–present (Reiwa era)	
photograph	Fumio Kishida 岸田 文󠄁雄; Rep for Hiroshima 1st (born 1957) Premiership	4 October 2021	1 October 2024	2 years, 364 days	2021	Liberal Democratic	101. Kishida II	Naruhito (Reiwa) r. 2019–present (Reiwa era)	
photograph	Shigeru Ishiba 石破 茂 Rep for Tottori 1st (born 1957) Premiership	1 October 2024	21 October 2025	1 year, 21 days	—	Liberal Democratic	102. Ishiba I	Naruhito (Reiwa) r. 2019–present (Reiwa era)	
photograph	Shigeru Ishiba 石破 茂 Rep for Tottori 1st (born 1957) Premiership	1 October 2024	21 October 2025	1 year, 21 days	2024	Liberal Democratic	103. Ishiba II	Naruhito (Reiwa) r. 2019–present (Reiwa era)	
photograph	Sanae Takaichi 高市 早苗; Rep for Nara 2nd (born 1961) Premiership	21 October 2025	Incumbent	1 year, 23 days	—	Liberal Democratic	104. Takaichi I	Naruhito (Reiwa) r. 2019–present (Reiwa era)	
photograph	Sanae Takaichi 高市 早苗; Rep for Nara 2nd (born 1961) Premiership	21 October 2025	Incumbent	1 year, 23 days	2026	Liberal Democratic	105. Takaichi II	Naruhito (Reiwa) r. 2019–present (Reiwa era)	

== Relations between prime ministers ==
Relations	Prime ministers
Brothers	1. Nobusuke Kishi (older) and Eisaku Satō (younger)
Grandfathers and grandsons	2. Fumimaro Konoe and Morihiro Hosokawa; 3. Nobusuke Kishi and Shinzo Abe; 4. Shigeru Yoshida and Tarō Asō; 5. Ichirō Hatoyama and Yukio Hatoyama
Great-uncle and great-nephew	6. Eisaku Satō and Shinzo Abe
Father and son	7. Takeo Fukuda and Yasuo Fukuda
Father-in-law and son-in-law	8. Zenkō Suzuki and Tarō Asō

== See also ==
- Deputy Prime Minister of Japan
- List of Japanese cabinets
- List of prime ministers of Japan by education
- List of prime ministers of Japan by home prefecture
- List of prime ministers of Japan by time in office
