= Ōkuma Cabinet =

Ōkuma Cabinet may refer to:

- First Ōkuma Cabinet, the Japanese government led by Ōkuma Shigenobu in 1898
- Second Ōkuma Cabinet, the Japanese government led by Ōkuma Shigenobu from 1914 to 1916
