= First Ōkuma cabinet =

Cabinet of Japan in 1898

First Ōkuma Cabinet
- 8th Cabinet of Japan
- June – November 1898
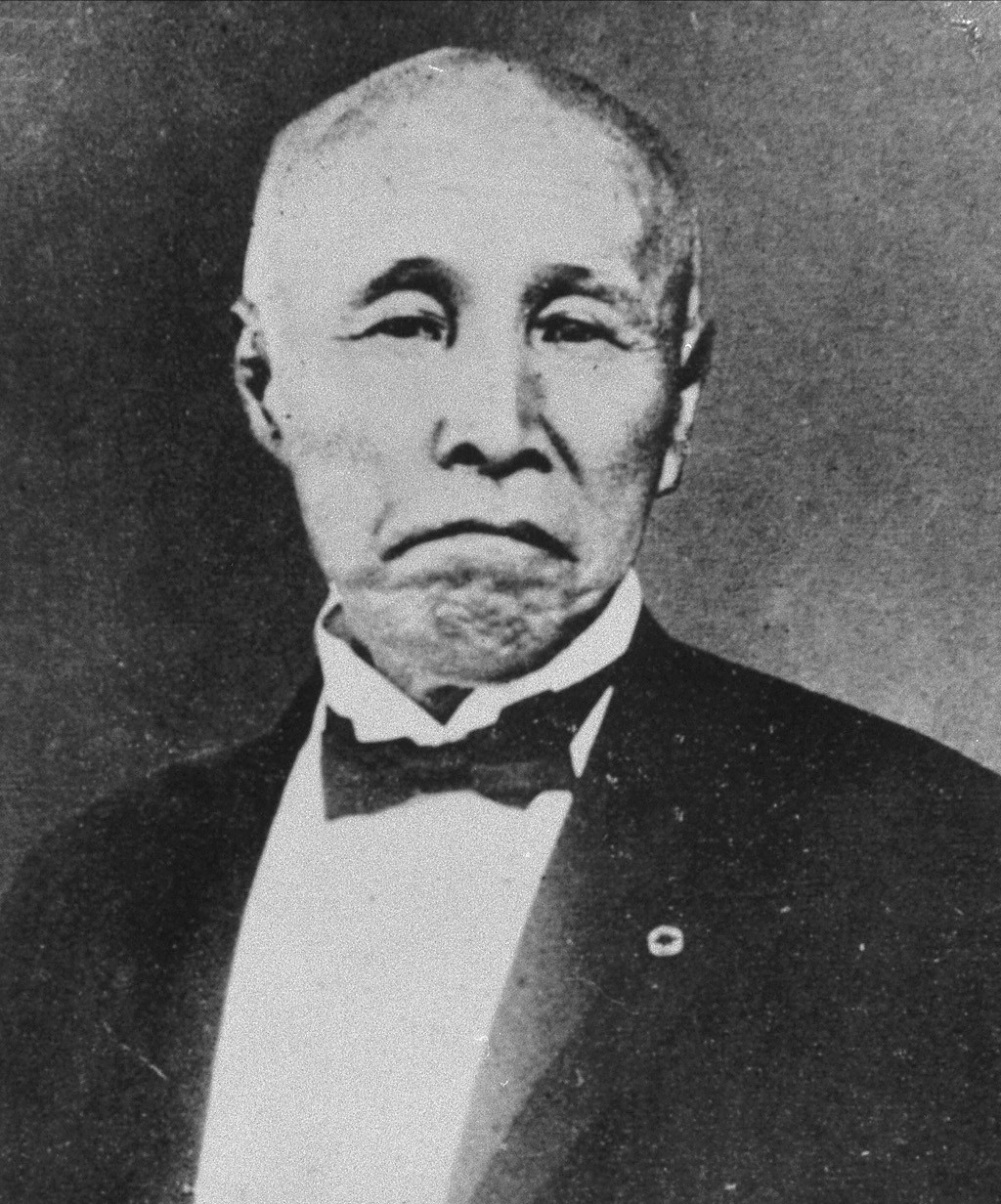
- Prime Minister Ōkuma Shigenobu
- Date formed: June 30, 1898
- Date dissolved: November 8, 1898

People and organisations
- Emperor: Meiji
- Prime Minister: Ōkuma Shigenobu

History
- Election: August 1898 general election
- Legislature terms: March–August 1898; August 1898–1902
- Predecessor: Third Itō Cabinet
- Successor: Second Yamagata Cabinet

The First Ōkuma Cabinet was the eighth Cabinet of Japan, and was led by Prime Minister Ōkuma Shigenobu from June 30 to November 8, 1898. It was Japan's first party-based cabinet, with all ministers except the two service ministers drawn from the Kenseitō.

The cabinet was formed only days after the Kenseitō was founded, through the merger of Ōkuma's Shimpotō and the Itagaki Taisuke's Jiyūtō. Internal divisions persisted, leading to a party split and the cabinet's collapse in November 1898.

== Cabinet ==
First Ōkuma Cabinet
Portfolio	Minister	Political party	Term start	Term end
Prime Minister	Count Ōkuma Shigenobu	Kenseitō (former Shimpotō)	June 30, 1898	November 8, 1898
Minister for Foreign Affairs	Count Ōkuma Shigenobu	Kenseitō (former Shimpotō)	June 30, 1898	November 8, 1898
Minister of Home Affairs	Count Itagaki Taisuke	Kenseitō (former Jiyūtō)	June 30, 1898	November 8, 1898
Minister of Finance	Matsuda Masahisa	Kenseitō (former Jiyūtō)	June 30, 1898	November 8, 1898
Minister of the Army	Viscount Katsura Tarō	Military (Army)	June 30, 1898	November 8, 1898
Minister of the Navy	Marquess Saigō Jūdō	Military (Navy)	June 30, 1898	November 8, 1898
Minister of Justice	Ohigashi Gitetsu	Kenseitō (former Shimpotō)	June 30, 1898	November 8, 1898
Minister of Education	Ozaki Yukio	Kenseitō (former Shimpotō)	June 30, 1898	October 27, 1898
Minister of Education	Inukai Tsuyoshi	Kenseitō (former Shimpotō)	October 27, 1898	November 8, 1898
Minister of Agriculture and Commerce	Ōishi Masami	Kenseitō (former Shimpotō)	June 30, 1898	November 8, 1898
Minister of Communications	Hayashi Yūzō	Kenseitō (former Jiyūtō)	June 30, 1898	November 8, 1898
Chief Cabinet Secretary	Taketomi Tokitoshi	Kenseitō (former Shimpotō)	June 30, 1898	November 8, 1898
Director-General of the Cabinet Legislation Bureau	Ume Kenjirō	Independent	June 30, 1898	July 27, 1898
Director-General of the Cabinet Legislation Bureau	Komuchi Tomotsune	Kenseitō (former Shimpotō)	July 27, 1898	November 8, 1898

Preceded by Third Itō Cabinet	Cabinet of Japan; 1898	Succeeded by Second Yamagata Cabinet
