= Premiership of Naoto Kan =

Japanese government from 2010 to 2011

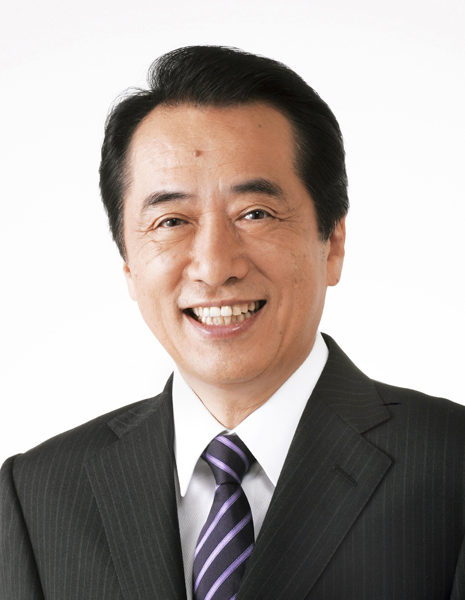
- Official portrait, 2010
- Premiership of Naoto Kan; 8 June 2010 – 2 September 2011
- Monarch: Akihito
- Cabinet: Kan cabinet
- Party: Democratic
- Seat: Naikaku Sōri Daijin Kantei
- Constituency: Tokyo 18th
- Emblem of the Government of Japan

Naoto Kan's tenure as prime minister of Japan began on 8 June 2010 when he was officially appointed prime minister by Emperor Akihito in a ceremony at the Tokyo Imperial Palace. On 26 August 2011, Kan announced his resignation. Yoshihiko Noda was elected as his successor.

== Democratic Party leadership bid ==
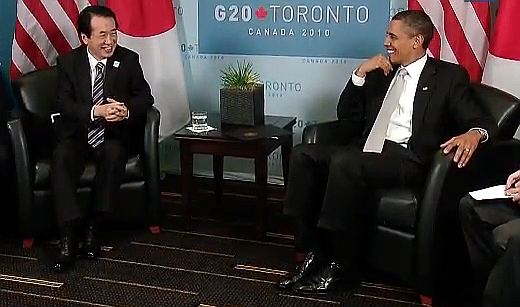
Kan with U.S. president Barack Obama at the 2010 G-20 Toronto summit on 27 June 2010

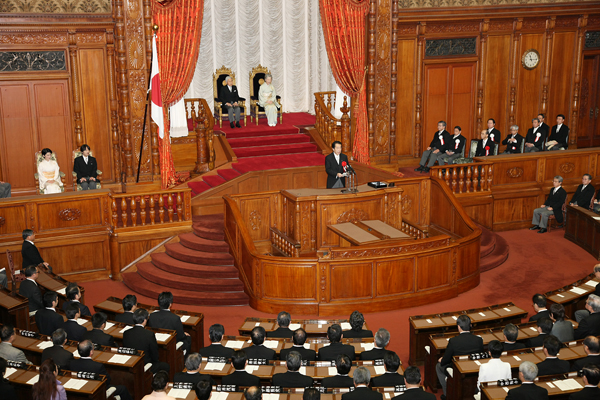
Prime Minister Kan giving the government's speech in front of the assembled lawmakers, in the presence of the Emperor Akihito and the Empress Michiko seated in the Chamber of the House of Councillors of the National Diet (29 November 2010)

On 2 June 2010, Yukio Hatoyama announced his intention to resign as the leader of the Democratic Party of Japan (DPJ) and as prime minister, also saying that he had urged his backer in the party, Ichirō Ozawa, to resign as secretary general. The Cabinet resigned en masse on 4 June. Foreign Minister Katsuya Okada and Land and Transport Minister Seiji Maehara, though once considered to be possible successors to Hatoyama, announced their support for Kan. Kan, at the age of 63, won the leadership of the DPJ with 291 votes to 129, defeating a relatively unknown Ozawa-backed legislator Shinji Tarutoko, 50, who was leading the environmental policy committee in the lower house of the Diet.

== Premiership ==
Subsequently, on 4 June, Kan was designated prime minister by the Diet. On 8 June, Emperor Akihito formally appointed Kan as the 94th Prime Minister, and the 29th postwar prime minister. His cabinet was formed later on the day.

Kan's approval ratings fell in the month of June after he proposed an increase in the sales tax rate from 5% to 10%. His sales tax increase proposal was opposed by Ichirō Ozawa, amongst others in the DPJ, and the proposal was quickly scaled back by Kan. The botched sales tax increase proposal was partially blamed for the DPJ's disappointing results in the July House of Councillors election, where the DPJ lost its majority and was forced to work with smaller, unaffiliated parties (such as Your Party, the JCP, and the SDP) in order to secure passage of bills in the House of Councillors.

In August, Kan apologised to the Republic of Korea on the 100th anniversary of the Japan–Korea Annexation Treaty.

Ozawa challenged Kan's leadership of the DPJ in September. Although it was initially believed that Ozawa had a slight edge among DPJ members of parliament, in the final vote Kan garnered the support of 206 DPJ lawmakers to Ozawa's 200. Local rank-and-file party members and activists overwhelmingly supported Kan, and according to opinion polls the wider Japanese public preferred Kan to Ozawa by as much as a 4:1 ratio.

After the leadership challenge, Kan reshuffled his cabinet, which left many prominent members of the pro-Ozawa faction of the DPJ without important posts in the new cabinet. The cabinet reshuffle also resulted in the promotion of long-time Kan ally Yoshito Sengoku to Chief Cabinet Secretary. Sengoku was labeled by the opposition LDP as the "second" Prime Minister of the Kan cabinet.

On 7 September, a Chinese fishing boat captain was arrested by the Japan Coast Guard (JCG) after his trawler had collided with JCG patrol boats in disputed waters near the Senkaku Islands. China protested the arrest, as it claims the islands as part of its sovereign territory, and demanded the unconditional release of the captain. The captain was released on 24 September, after China had cut off all ministerial-level contacts with Japan and threatened further action. The incident brought Sino-Japanese relations to its lowest point since the Koizumi administration.

The Kan government intervened in mid-September to weaken the surging yen by buying U.S. dollars, a move which temporarily relieved Japan's exporters. The move proved popular with stock brokers, Japanese exporters, and the Japanese public. It was the first such move by a Japanese government since 2004. Later, in October, after the yen had offset the intervention and had reached a 15-year high, the Kan cabinet approved a stimulus package worth about 5.1 trillion yen ($62 billion) in order to weaken the yen and fight deflation.

In November, Kan spoke out forcefully in support of South Korea and in harsh criticism of North Korea in the wake of the latter's bombardment of Yeonpyeong, meanwhile ignoring China's public comments which had not yet included denunciation of the North.

=== Fukushima nuclear accident response ===
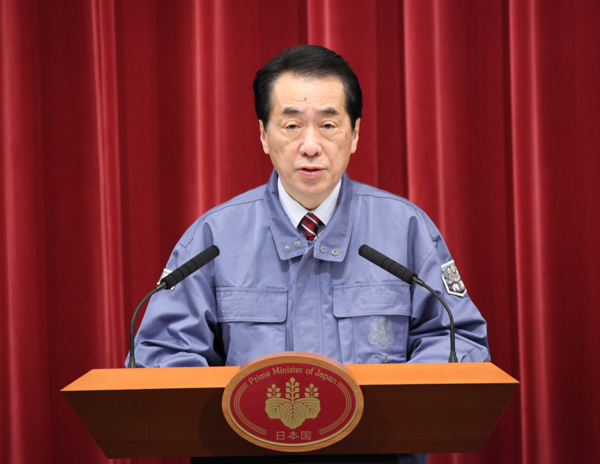
Kan giving a press conference on the day of the Fukushima nuclear accident.

After the earthquake and tsunami in northeastern Japan on the afternoon of March 11, 2011, Kan flew by helicopter to the Fukushima I Nuclear Power Plant early the next morning, and was thereafter heavily involved in efforts to effectively respond to the Fukushima nuclear accident.

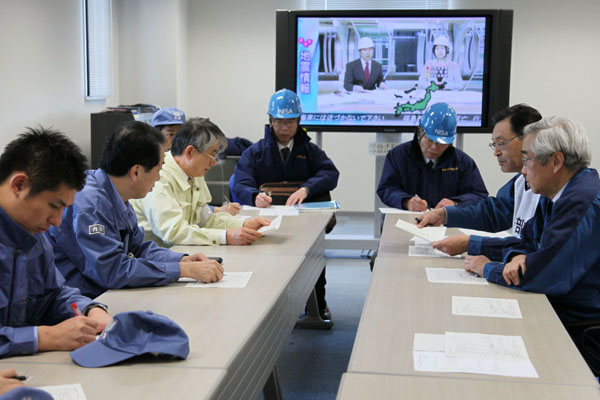
Kan's meeting with TEPCO officials at Fukushima Daiichi Nuclear Power Plant the morning after the 2011 Tōhoku earthquake and tsunami.

Venting from the Fukushima plant began on the morning of 12 March, shortly after Kan's meeting with Tokyo Electric Power Company (TEPCO) management at the plant, and that afternoon the plant suffered its first explosion. That evening, following an order from METI Minister Kaieda to begin pumping seawater into the plant for emergency cooling purposes, Kan expressed concern that the seawater injection plan may lead to re-criticality, in response to which TEPCO directed plant manager Masao Yoshida to stop pumping (an order which Yoshida tacitly ignored). After further briefings on the issue, Kan directed pumping to continue later that evening. Several weeks later, Shinzo Abe circulated information that Kan had ordered pumping to stop, which the Yomiuri Shimbun and other news outlets reported as fact, and opposition leader Sadakazu Tanigaki accused the government of causing the Fukushima meltdowns.

Early in the morning of 15 March, amid rumors that TEPCO intended to abandon the plant and allow a full meltdown that would potentially trigger an evacuation of the entire Kanto region, Kan ordered the establishment of a joint response headquarters between the government and TEPCO, and personally traveled to TEPCO headquarters on half an hour's notice. While this move initially antagonized TEPCO, it was later positively evaluated as improving communications between the plant operator and government agencies such as the Self-Defense Forces and Tokyo Fire Department.

Kan slept in the Prime Minister's Office and did not return home for an entire week after the disaster struck; he wore blue coveralls instead of a suit until the end of March.

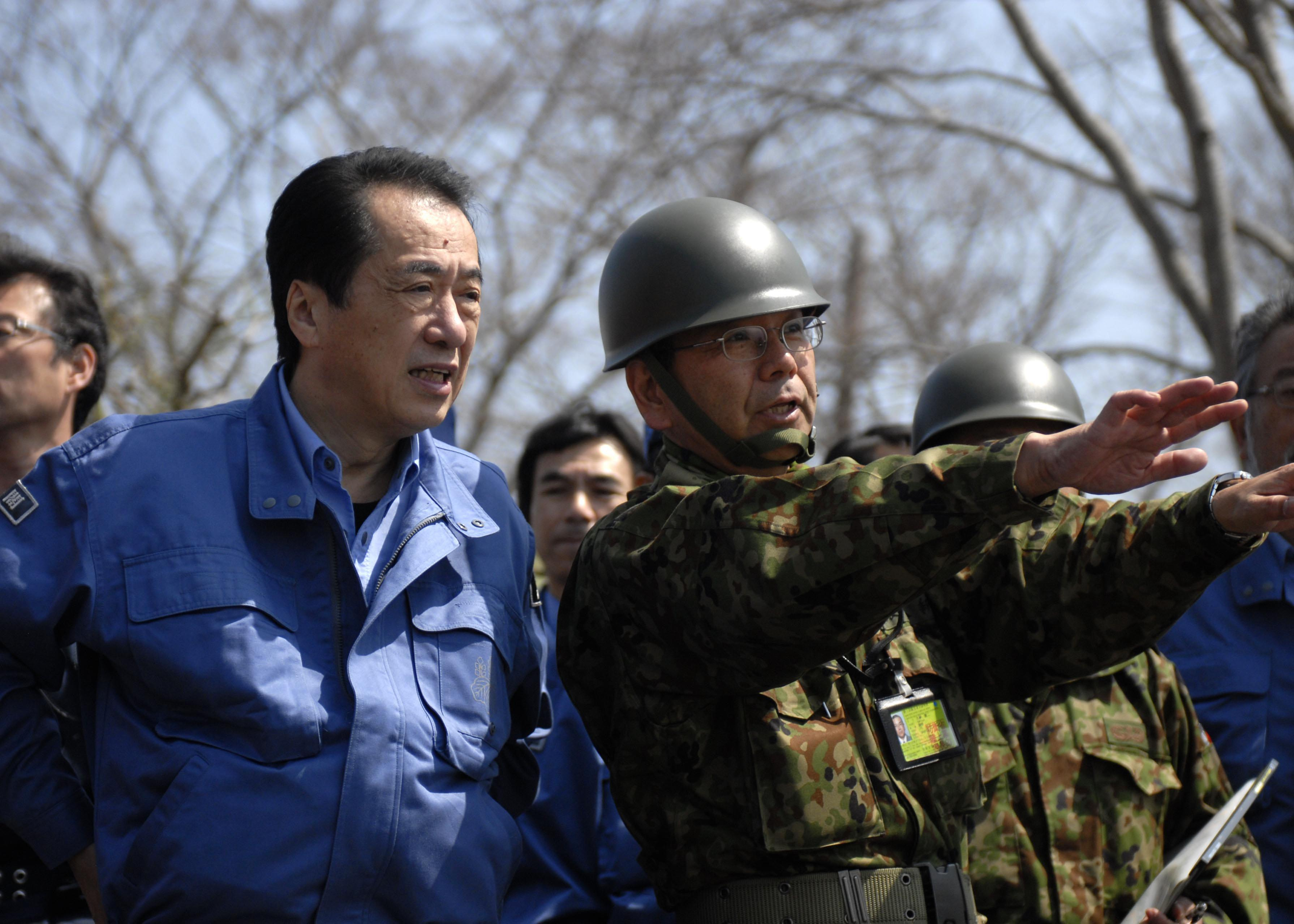
Kan inspects Ishinomaki, one month after the Great East Japan earthquake.

Kan took an increasingly anti-nuclear stance in the months following the Fukushima disaster. In May, he ordered that the aging Hamaoka Nuclear Power Plant be closed over earthquake and tsunami fears, and he said he would freeze plans to build new reactors.

Despite falling popularity, Kan rejected calls to step down while the country continued to suffer from the earthquake, tsunami, and nuclear crises of spring 2011. One year into his premiership on 2 June 2011, Kan proposed his resignation, hours before the Diet put forward a vote of no-confidence. The motion was defeated by 293 to 152, bolstering the Prime Minister's position.

In July 2011, Kan said that Japan must reduce its dependence on nuclear energy, breaking with a decades-old Japanese government drive to build more nuclear power plants in the country. "We must scrap the plan to have nuclear power contribute 53 percent (of electricity supply) by 2030 and reduce the degree of reliance on nuclear power," Kan told a government panel. Kan said Japan should abandon plans to build 14 new reactors by 2030. He wants to "pass a bill to promote renewable energy and questioned whether private companies should be running atomic plants". In August, Kan removed three of Japan's top nuclear energy officials in effort to break ties between government and the atomic industry.

When interviewed in 2012, after resigning as prime minister, Kan said the Fukushima accident made it clear to him that "Japan needs to dramatically reduce its dependence on nuclear power, which supplied 30 percent of its electricity before the crisis, and has turned him into a believer of renewable energy." He said that at one point Japan faced a situation where there was a chance that people might not be able to live in the capital zone including Tokyo and would have to evacuate, and that he was haunted by the specter of an even bigger nuclear crisis forcing tens of millions of people to flee Tokyo and threatening the nation's existence. "If things had reached that level, not only would the public have had to face hardships but Japan's very existence would have been in peril". That convinced Kan to "declare the need for Japan to end its reliance on atomic power and promote renewable sources of energy such solar [sic] that have long taken a back seat in the resource-poor country's energy mix". He told a parliamentary investigation in 2012 that the nuclear industry had "shown no remorse" for the disaster, and was trying to push Japan back to nuclear power.

=== Resignation ===
Kan announced his intention to resign on 10 August 2011. On 26 August, with passage of a debt bill and the renewable energy bill as final conditions, Kan expected "to see his successor in office [within the] week, according to a Kyodo news report, which cited cabinet ministers". At the same time, Seiji Maehara, who had supported Kan in 2010, was reported to have announced his intention to run to succeed Kan. Maehara was seen as the potential DPJ candidate most popular with the voters at the time, but several other cabinet members joined the race, and the election of the DPJ successor was scheduled for 29 August. At that time, Yoshihiko Noda, most recently finance minister, was elected as the new DPJ leader and, as leader of the largest party in the Diet, became prime minister as well.
