= Premiership of Yoshihide Suga =

Japanese government from 2020 to 2021

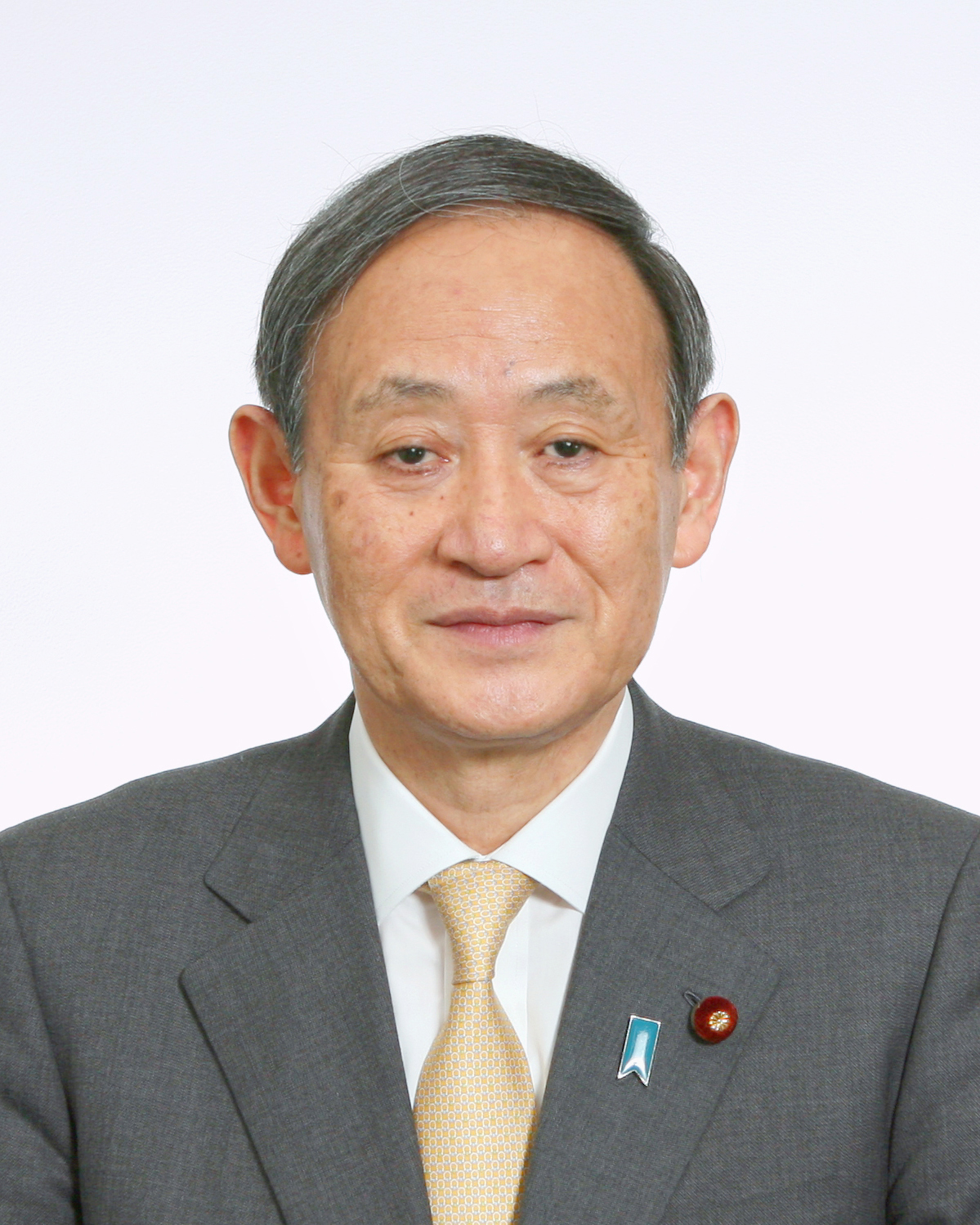
- Official portrait, 2020
- Premiership of Yoshihide Suga; 16 September 2020 – 4 October 2021
- Monarch: Naruhito
- Cabinet: Suga Cabinet
- Party: Liberal Democratic
- Seat: Naikaku Sōri Daijin Kantei
- Constituency: Kanagawa 2nd
- Emblem of the Government of Japan

Yoshihide Suga's tenure as prime minister of Japan began on 16 September 2020 when he was officially appointed prime minister by Emperor Naruhito in a ceremony at the Tokyo Imperial Palace, succeeding Shinzo Abe.

Suga's stood in the 2020 Liberal Democratic Party presidential election to succeed Abe, who resigned due to his ulcerative colitis. Suga quickly emerged as the leading contender to replace Abe, quickly winning support from top figures in the Liberal Democratic Party. He was elected to the presidency of the LDP on 14 September 2020, with 377 votes out of a total of 534.

Suga's premiership focused primarily on responding to the COVID-19 pandemic, including overseeing the rollout of vaccines in the country. Suga's time in office also saw the holding of the delayed 2020 Summer Olympics and Paralympics in Tokyo and the announcement of a plan for Japan to reach carbon neutrality by 2050. While Suga began his time in office relatively popular, his approval ratings fell due to public dissatisfaction with the government's handling of the pandemic and the Olympic Games. Facing hesitancy from his party amid preparation for the upcoming 2021 general election, Suga announced on 3 September 2021 that he would not seek reelection in the 2021 LDP presidential election, effectively resigning as party president and prime minister. His tenure officially ended on 4 October 2021 after he was succeeded by Fumio Kishida.

== LDP presidential bid ==
Following Shinzo Abe's resignation announcement in August 2020 due to his ulcerative colitis, Suga emerged as the leading contender to replace Abe on the leadership election, having gained the support of Deputy Prime Minister Tarō Asō and LDP Secretary-General Toshihiro Nikai, as well as the two largest factions in the LDP and supposedly even Abe himself. Suga's main competitors in the LDP leadership race were longtime Abe rival Shigeru Ishiba and LDP policy chief Fumio Kishida. Suga was elected to the presidency of the Liberal Democratic Party on 14 September 2020, with 377 votes out of a total of 534.

Upon his election, Suga outlined a policy agenda that included tackling the ongoing pandemic and implementing further deregulation to revitalize the economy. He reiterated his past interest in consolidating regional banks and lowering mobile phone charges in Japan. Suga vowed to continue the economic policies of his predecessor, known as Abenomics, and to continue the path of Shinzo Abe in terms of foreign policy, making his "top priority" the issue of Japanese citizens abducted by North Korea, as well as continuing to seek constitutional revision, including a new clause to Article 9 of the Japanese Constitution legitimizing the existence of Japan Self-Defense Forces.

== Premiership ==
Suga and his cabinet were sworn in on 16 September 2020. At the first press conference as the prime minister, Suga officially stated that his premiership will focus first on responding to the COVID-19 pandemic, the second on protecting employment and ensuring businesses in savior economic conditions, the third on continuing the Abenomics for economic revival, and the fourth on digital transformation and the review of supply chains.

=== Foreign policy ===
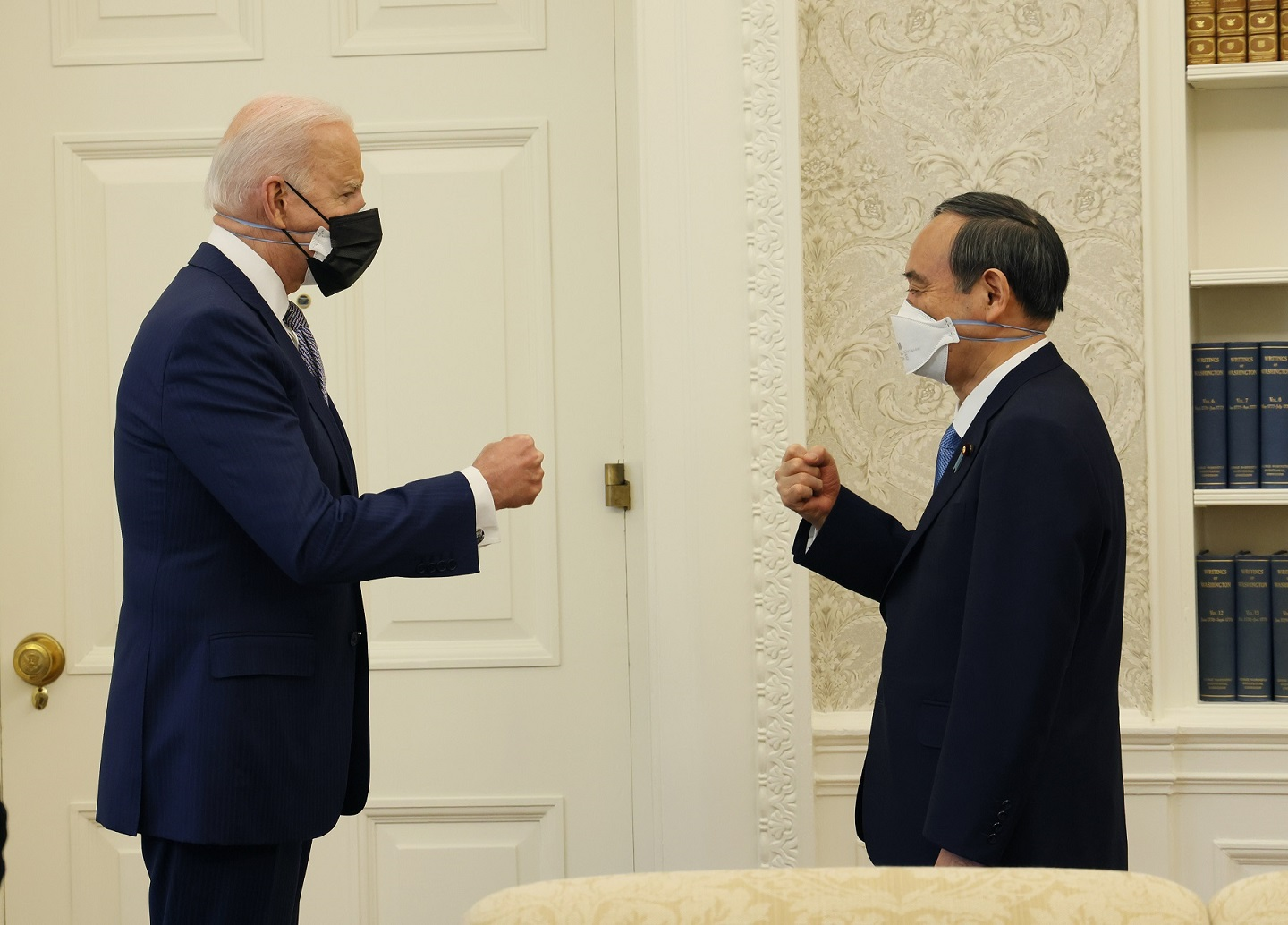
Suga meets with U.S. President Joe Biden at the Oval Office of the White House during Suga's visit to Washington D.C., 16 April 2021

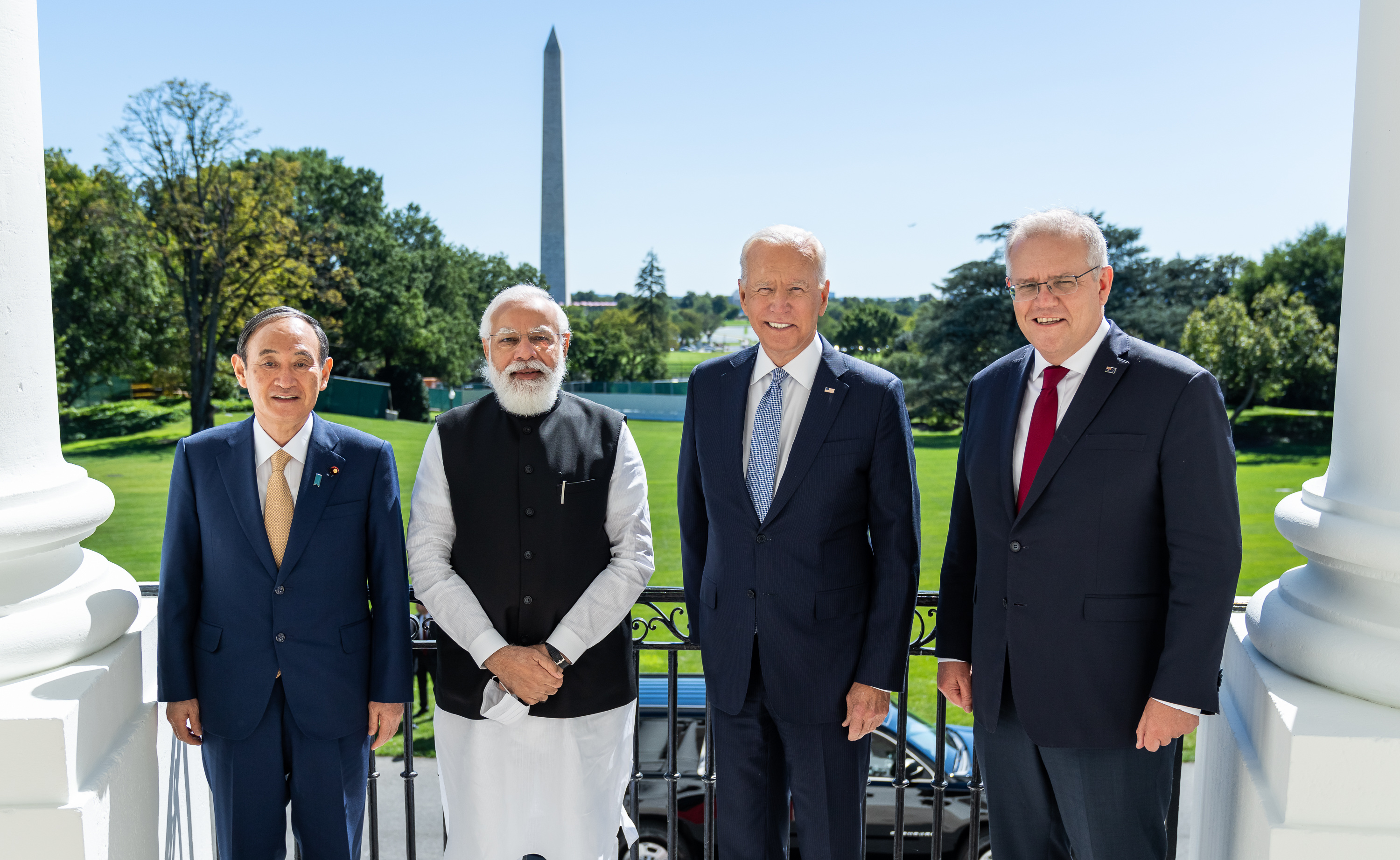
Suga with Quad leaders in September 2021

In October 2020, Suga made his first trips abroad to Vietnam and Indonesia, with analysts saying that he chose those two countries amid the growing tensions between one of its closest allies, the United States, and China. Suga also vowed to strengthen ties with Southeast Asian countries and signed an agreement allowing his government to export defense equipment and technology to Vietnam.

Suga has also committed to stronger ties with US President Joe Biden to discuss the US-Japan security alliance, the COVID-19 pandemic and climate change. In particular, Suga considered attending a global climate summit proposed by Biden in a push to bring nations in line with Japan's goal of becoming carbon neutral by 2050. Suga has made previous environmental commitments, such as a ¥2 trillion fund to promote research into decarbonization technologies and the setting of specific goals at the 26th United Nations Climate Change Conference of the Parties in the UK in November 2021. They have also agreed to work towards complete denuclearization of North Korea. Suga flew to the United States to meet with President Joe Biden in April 2021. Suga was the first foreign leader to visit Biden at the White House.

Suga has also vowed to fight Chinese influence in the Pacific region. In July 2021, he held a remote meeting with Pacific nations leaders and pledged 3 million COVID-19 vaccines in an effort to counter Chinese influence. The move was supported by the United States. Suga also pledged help to Tuvalu and other Pacific nations in the fight against climate change.

=== COVID-19 response ===
In his 2021 New Year's address, Suga pledged to bring COVID-19 under control and to push forward with preparations for the 2020 Tokyo Olympics and Paralympics, which had been postponed due to the COVID-19 pandemic.

Suga implemented the GoTo stimulus program, which provides steep discounts for domestic travel in response to the economic consequences of the pandemic. By stimulating demand for tourism, it was aimed at boosting regional economies and helping hotels and airlines. However, it was suspended in December 2020 after criticism that it helped spread the virus and conflicted with the government's message for avoiding unnecessary travel. This was after Suga denied considering a halt to the campaign to focus on improving the economy.

Suga has received criticism for his handling of the COVID-19 pandemic. His attendance at an expensive steak dinner for eight, which included several celebrities and politicians and had happened after his decision to suspend "GoTo Travel", was deprecated by the public; all attendees were over 70, a high-risk age group for the virus. At the time, the government was advising people to avoid dining in groups of more than five. Suga has subsequently apologized.

In January 2021, Suga declared a state of emergency in the Greater Tokyo Area and the three surrounding prefectures, which was Japan's first such declaration since April 2020. The emergency included restrictions on daily life, with remote work encouraged and residents being urged to avoid non-essential outings; however, schools remained open. While the state of emergency carries no legal power, Suga has stated the government will consider amending the law to allow local authorities to penalize businesses that do not comply with official requests. Suga also pledged to provide up to ¥1.8 million per month to each restaurant that complies with a request to shorten its operating hours.

=== Approval rating ===
Suga's cabinet has seen fluctuating approval since Abe's resignation. The cabinet's approval rating dropped from 74 percent in September 2020 to 42 percent in January 2021. Shigeru Omi, the COVID-19 task force chief, said that this was due to Suga's GoTo promotions. It has also been attributed to his rejection of scholars on a science advisory panel. The drop in approval for Suga's cabinet proved the largest since October 2010, following the Senkaku boat collision incident. Approval bounced from 38 percent in February to 42 percent in March 2021. The cabinet's approval hit a record low in May 2021, hitting 33 percent after having again dropped to 40 percent the previous month. Amidst rising coronavirus cases in the community in the Greater Tokyo area, Suga's approval rating dwindled to a record lows of 31% in July and 28% in August while hosting the Tokyo 2020 Olympic Games during a pandemic. In an election widely seen as a referendum on the ruling LDP's Coronavirus response, the candidate that Suga endorsed lost the Yokohama mayoral race in August by a considerable margin putting considerable pressure on Suga's reelection chances in the upcoming national election, as an MP representing Kanagawa.

=== Resignation ===
On 3 September 2021, Suga announced that he would not seek re-election as the head of its governing party. This announcement followed his approval ratings being at an all-time low (below 30% in recent polls) as the nation struggled with its worst wave of COVID-19 infections ahead of the general election that year. His resignation would become effective on 30 September 2021, a day after the Liberal Democratic leadership election. Suga's announcement came at a press conference where a LDP leadership reshuffle was to be announced; although Suga had reportedly been fully intent on running as of the day before, both Shinzo Abe and Taro Aso refused to cooperate further with Suga's leadership in conversations on the evening of the 2nd, leading to Suga's surprise announcement the next morning.

On 29 September 2021, the LDP elected former foreign minister Fumio Kishida as new leader of the party and virtually making the prime minister-designate of Japan. Kishida replaced Suga on 4 October 2021.
