= Premiership of Yukio Hatoyama =

Japanese government from 2009 to 2010

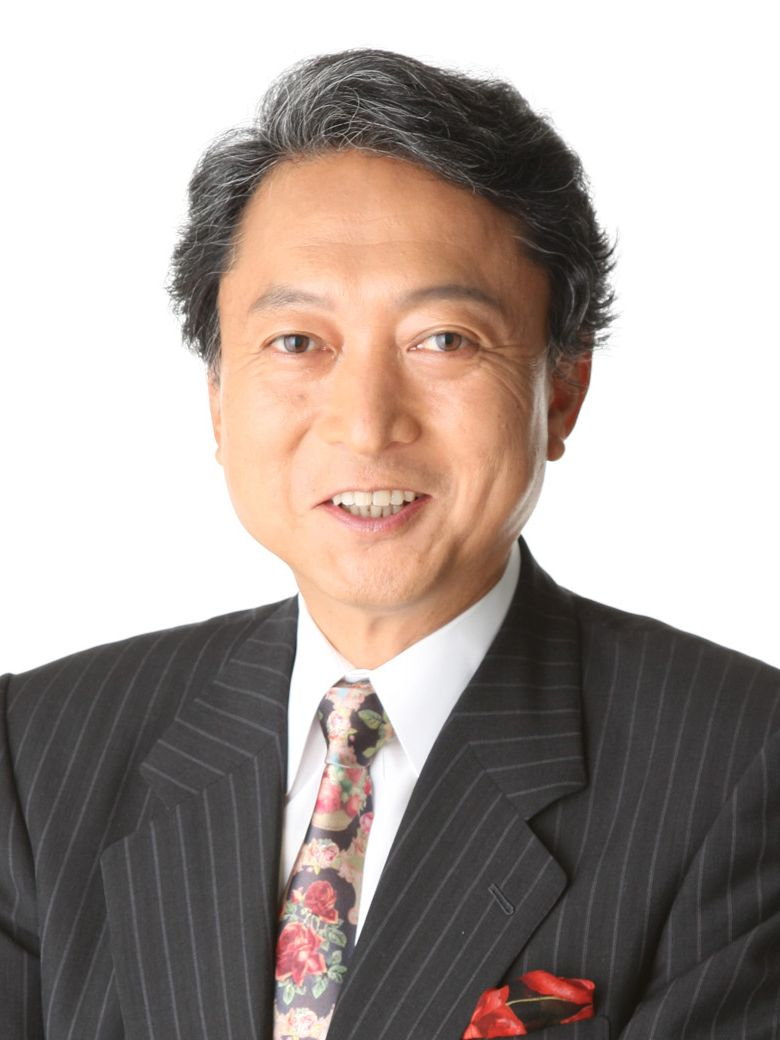
- Official portrait, 2007
- Premiership of Yukio Hatoyama; 16 September 2009 – 8 June 2010
- Monarch: Akihito
- Cabinet: Yukio Hatoyama Cabinet
- Party: Democratic
- Election: 2009
- Seat: Naikaku Sōri Daijin Kantei
- Constituency: Hokkaido 9th
- Emblem of the Government of Japan

Yukio Hatoyama's tenure as prime minister of Japan began on 16 September 2009 when he was officially appointed prime minister by Emperor Akihito in a ceremony at the Tokyo Imperial Palace. During his premiership, Hatoyama attempted spending cuts on public works projects. He also moved to change Japan's foreign policy from a United States-centric one to a more Asia-focused one. Hatoyama's premiership saw improved relations between China and Japan, as well as with Japan's other neighbors. Though initially enjoying high approval ratings, his popularity soon dropped due to various reasons including a finance scandal. In 2010, he announced his resignation as prime minister, citing breaking a campaign promise to close an American military base on the island of Okinawa.

== Premiership ==
Hatoyama entered his prime minister career with a high approval rating. The DPJ promised to end lavish spending on public works projects associated with LDP and to divert that money to tax cuts and subsidies for households. Expectations were high that he would break strongly with the policies of the LDP.

Hatoyama's popularity soon began to falter after the DPJ struggled to meet the high expectations they set in the midst of a sliding economy. In May 2010 he faced a possible no confidence vote, and on 2 June 2010, Hatoyama announced that he would be resigning as Prime Minister.

Although Yukio Hatayoma was prime minister for less than a year, he had a wide range of achievements to his name by the time that he left office. Amongst his achievements included:

- The introduction of a state subsidy for families with young children.
- The abolition of public high school tuition fees.
- The introduction of an individual household income support project for rice farmers.
- The restoration of the Additional Living Support Allowance for Single-Mother Households.
- A big increase in social spending, with the social security budget, including spending on childrearing, nursing care, and medical care, increased by 9.8% as child allowances were introduced and the remuneration schedule for medical services was increased for the first time in ten years.
- An 8.2% increase in the education budget.
- An expansion in the student scholarship system to cover more students.
- The extension of employment insurance to all workers.
- A reduction in medical expenses for unemployed persons.
- The elimination of age-discriminatory practices in remuneration schedules and medical services.
- The expansion of assistance for the "development of public rental housing with annexed facilities for supporting the elderly and childrearing households" to include "public rental housing with annexed medical facilities".
- The introduction of free welfare services and equipment for low-income persons with disabilities.

=== Illegal campaign contributions ===
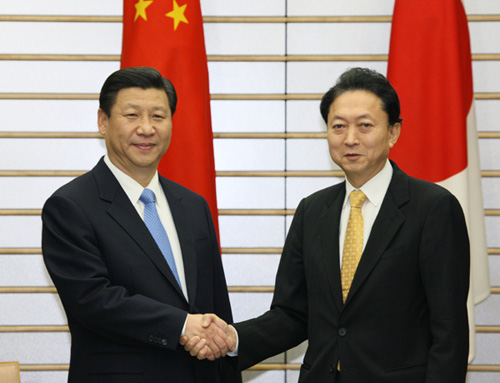
Hatoyama meeting with Chinese Vice President Xi Jinping on 14 December 2009

In December 2009, a finance scandal caused a drop in Hatoyama's popularity. It was revealed that Hatoyama received $4 million in donations that were improperly reported. Most of the money was given by his mother, a wealthy heiress, and some of the reported givers had the names of deceased people. The scandal raised questions about his credibility while also highlighting his privileged background. However, according to NHK in 2010 prosecutors chose not to pursue him citing insufficient evidence of criminal activity, although a secretary was given a suspended prison sentence, and a review panel commented: "it is difficult to believe Hatoyama's assertion he was unaware of the falsifications."

=== Spending review ===
In December, the DPJ created a government task force to review government spending and pledged to make cuts equal to $32.8 billion. However, the task force cut only a quarter of that amount. Hatoyama even had to renege on a campaign promise to cut road-related taxes – including a highly symbolic gasoline tax and highway tolls. Hatoyama faced criticism from fringes of his own party, some calling for a return to public works spending.

=== Foreign policy ===
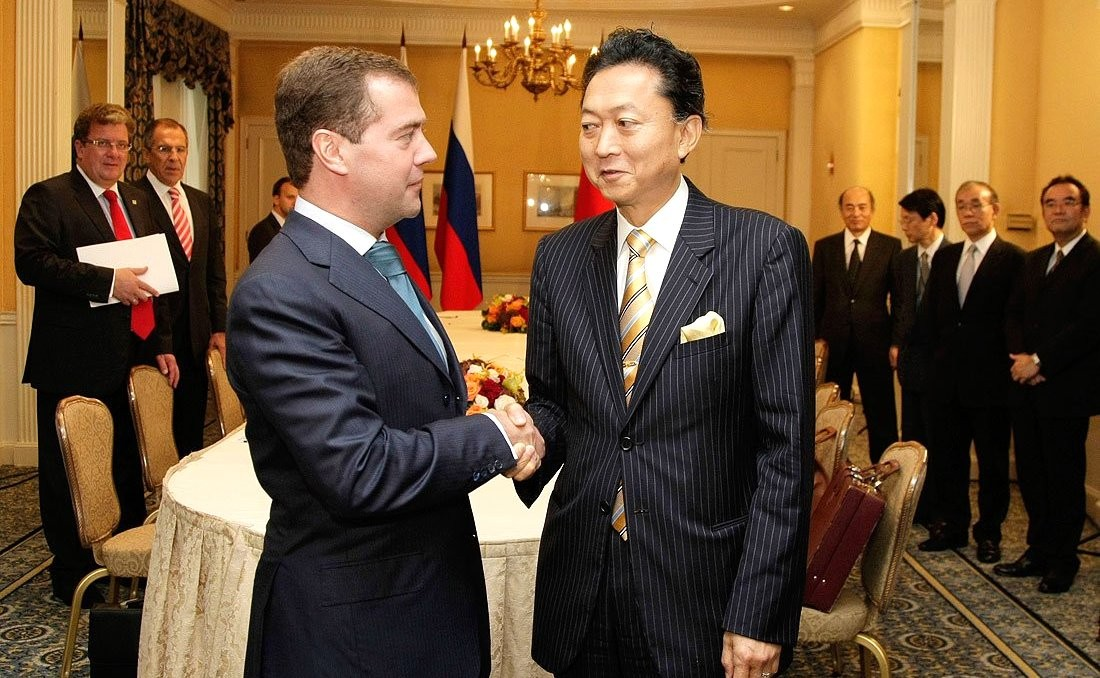
Hatoyama with Dmitry Medvedev (23 September 2009)

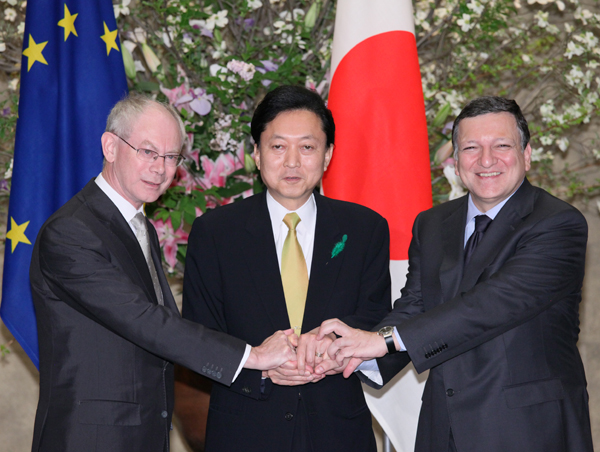
Hatoyama with Herman Van Rompuy and José Manuel Barroso (at the EU–Japan Summit on 28 April 2010)

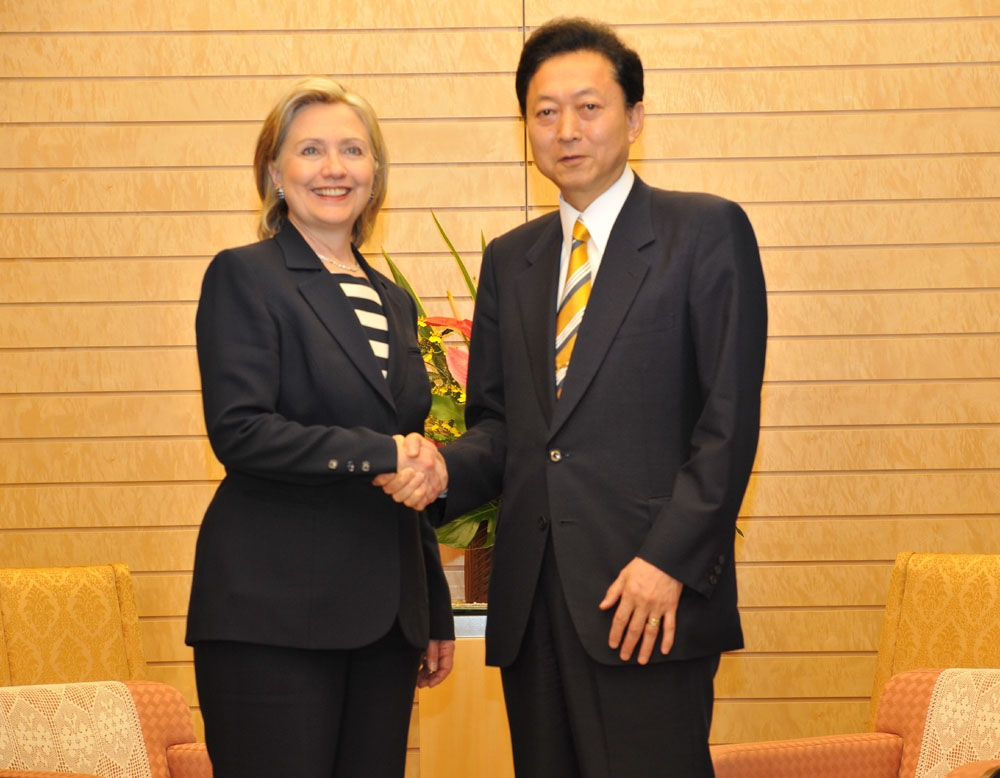
Hatoyama with Hillary Clinton (at the Prime Minister's Official Residence on 21 May 2010)

Hatoyama, representing the policies DPJ campaigned on, wanted to shift Japan's focus from a more America-centric foreign policy to a more Asia-focused policy. Also, he wanted to make foreign policy decisions with America more transparent, from a popular perception that Japanese foreign policy was determined by insiders behind closed doors.

The DPJ's election platform called for re-examining its ties with the United States. As the 1960 Japan–U.S. security treaty entered its 50th year, Hatoyama called for a "close and equal" Japan–U.S. relationship, which meant more independence for Japan's role. Hatoyama ended an eight-year refueling mission in Afghanistan, a highly symbolic move because the mission had long been criticized for violating the nation's pacifist Constitution. In order not to anger Washington, Hatoyama offered $5 billion in civilian aid for Afghanistan reconstruction.

Hatoyama was also faced with the issue of the relocation of the American Futenma Marine Corps Air Base. The United States government hoped that Hatoyama would honor a 2006 agreement to relocate the base to a less populated part of Okinawa and move 8,000 marines to Guam. Some voices in the DPJ demanded that America move its military bases off Okinawa islands altogether. Hatoyama was torn between public opinion on Okinawa and the desire to retain strong ties with Washington.

In moving towards a more Asia-centered foreign policy, Hatoyama worked towards making relations better with nearby East Asian countries, even saying "the Japanese Islands don't belong to only Japanese". Hatoyama worked to deepen economic integration with the East Asian region, pushing for a free trade zone in Asia by 2020 and proposing Haneda airport as a 24-hour hub for international flights. In January 2010, he welcomed South Korea's president, calling for 'future-oriented' ties, as opposed to recalling the past, in which Japan colonized Korea.

Relations with China also warmed under Hatoyama. The first few months saw an exchange of visits, including one by favored successor to China's leadership Xi Jinping, for whom Hatoyama hastily arranged an appointment with Emperor Akihito. On 7 January, the Daily Yomiuri reported high-level discussion over a further exchange of visits between the two countries to promote reconciliation over historical issues. "Beijing aims to ease anti-Japan sentiment among the Chinese public by having Hatoyama visit Nanjing and express a sense of regret about the Sino-Japanese War", the paper reported.

=== Resignation ===
On 2 June 2010, Hatoyama announced his resignation as Prime Minister before a meeting of the Japanese Democratic Party. He cited breaking a campaign promise to close an American military base on the island of Okinawa as the main reason for the move. On 28 May 2010, soon after and because of increased tensions from the sinking of a South Korean navy ship allegedly by North Korea, Hatoyama had made a deal with U.S. President Barack Obama to retain the base for security reasons, but the deal was unpopular in Japan. He also mentioned money scandals involving a top party leader, Ichirō Ozawa, who resigned as well, in his decision to step down. Hatoyama had been pressed to leave by members of his party after doing poorly in polls in anticipation of an upper house election in July 2010.

== Cabinet ==
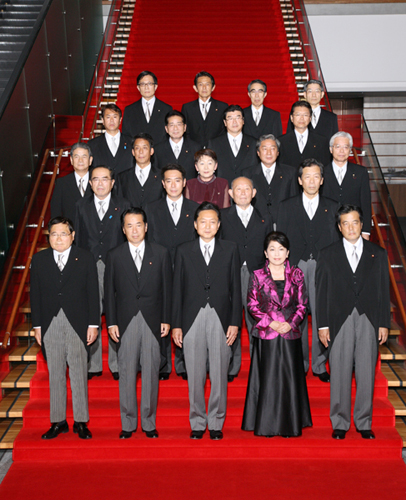
Ministers of Hatoyama Government (at the Prime Minister's Official Residence on 16 September 2009)

Deputy Prime Minister Minister of Finance Minister of State for Economic and Fiscal Policy	Naoto Kan
Minister of Internal Affairs and Communications Minister of State for Promotion of Local Sovereignty	Kazuhiro Haraguchi
Minister of Justice	Keiko Chiba
Minister of Foreign Affairs	Katsuya Okada
Minister of Education, Culture, Sports, Science and Technology Minister of State for Science and Technology Policy	Tatsuo Kawabata
Minister of Health, Labour and Welfare Minister of State for Pension Reform	Akira Nagatsuma
Minister of Agriculture, Forestry and Fisheries	Hirotaka Akamatsu
Minister of Economy, Trade and Industry	Masayuki Naoshima
Minister of Land, Infrastructure, Transport and Tourism Minister of State for Okinawa and Northern Territories Affairs	Seiji Maehara
Minister of the Environment	Sakihito Ozawa
Minister of Defence	Toshimi Kitazawa
Chief Cabinet Secretary Minister of State for Consumer Affairs, Food Safety, Social Affairs, and Gender Equality	Hirofumi Hirano
Chairman of the National Commission on Public Safety Minister of State for Disaster Management Minister of State for the Abduction Issue	Hiroshi Nakai
Minister of State for Financial Services Minister of State for Postal Reform	Shizuka Kamei
Minister of State for the New Concept of Public Service Minister of State for Civil Service Reform Minister of State for National Policy	Yoshito Sengoku
Minister of State for Government Revitalisation	Yukio Edano
