= Third Itō cabinet =

Cabinet of Japan in 1898

Third Itō Cabinet
- 7th Cabinet of Japan
- January – June 1898
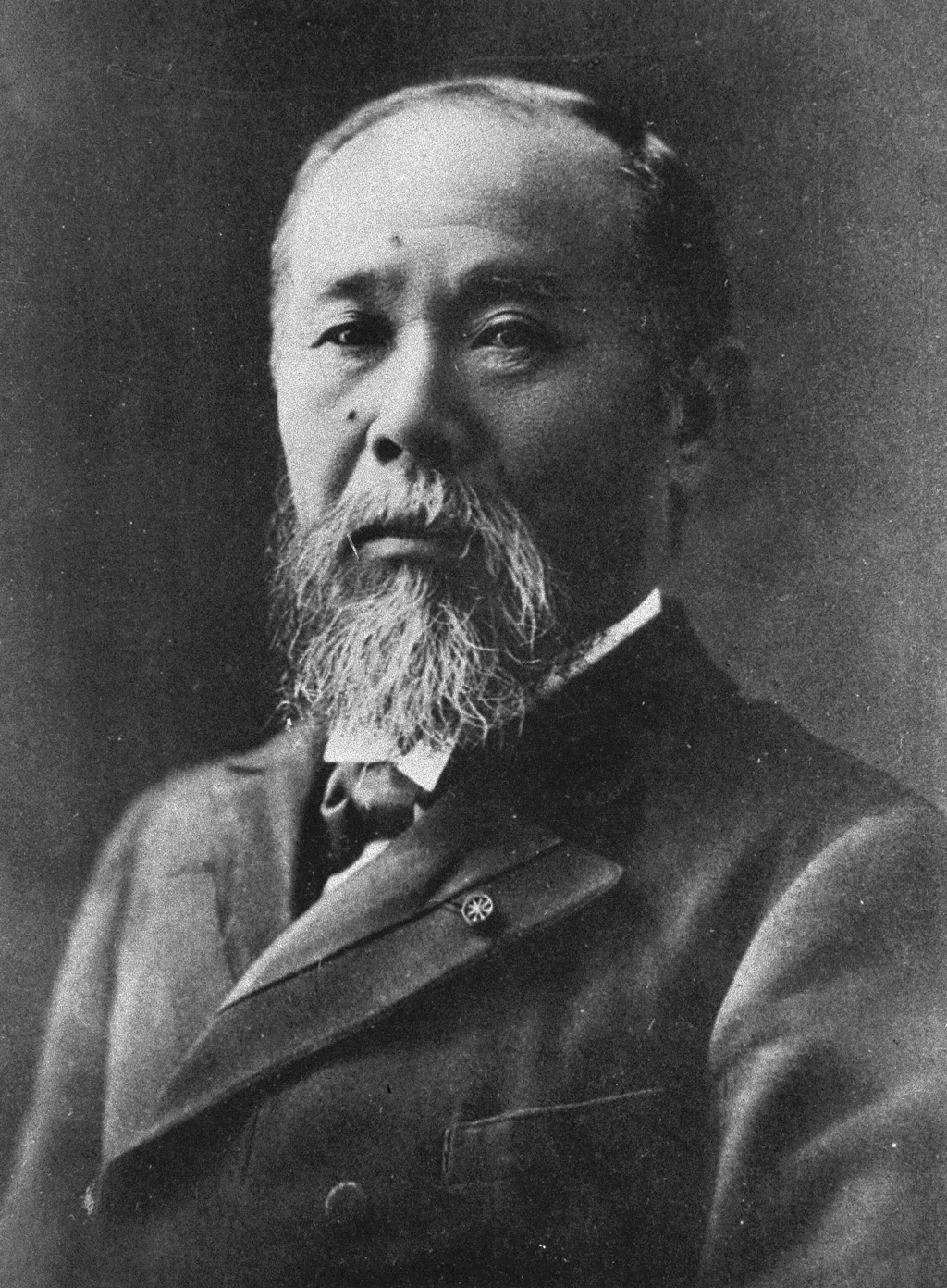
- Prime Minister Itō Hirobumi
- Date formed: January 12, 1898
- Date dissolved: June 30, 1898

People and organisations
- Emperor: Meiji
- Prime Minister: Itô Hirobumi

History
- Election: March 1898 general election
- Legislature terms: September 1894–March 1898; March–August 1898
- Predecessor: Second Matsukata Cabinet
- Successor: First Ōkuma Cabinet

The Third Itō Cabinet is the seventh Cabinet of Japan led by Itō Hirobumi from January 12, 1898, to June 30, 1898.

== Cabinet ==
Third Itō Cabinet
Portfolio	Minister	Political party	Term start	Term end
Prime Minister	Marquess Itō Hirobumi	Independent	January 12, 1898	June 30, 1898
Minister for Foreign Affairs	Baron Nishi Tokujirō	Independent	January 12, 1898	June 30, 1898
Minister of Home Affairs	Viscount Yoshikawa Akimasa	Independent	January 12, 1898	June 30, 1898
Minister of Finance	Count Inoue Kaoru	Independent	January 12, 1898	June 30, 1898
Minister of the Army	Viscount Katsura Tarō	Military (Army)	January 12, 1898	June 30, 1898
Minister of the Navy	Marquess Saigō Jūdō	Kokumin Kyōkai	January 12, 1898	June 30, 1898
Minister of Justice	Sone Arasuke	Independent	January 12, 1898	June 30, 1898
Minister of Education	Marquess Saionji Kinmochi	Independent	January 12, 1898	April 30, 1898
Minister of Education	Masakazu Toyama	Independent	April 30, 1898	June 30, 1898
Minister of Agriculture and Commerce	Baron Itō Miyoji	Independent	January 12, 1898	April 26, 1898
Minister of Agriculture and Commerce	Kaneko Kentarō	Independent	April 26, 1898	June 30, 1898
Minister of Communications	Suematsu Kenchō	Independent	January 12, 1898	June 30, 1898
Minister without portfolio	Count Kuroda Kiyotaka	Military (Army)	January 12, 1898	June 27, 1898
Chief Cabinet Secretary	Samejima Takenosuke	Independent	January 12, 1898	June 27, 1898
Director-General of the Cabinet Legislation Bureau	Ume Kenjirō	Independent	January 12, 1898	June 27, 1898

Preceded by Second Matsukata Cabinet	Cabinet of Japan; 1898	Succeeded by First Ōkuma Cabinet
