= Premiership of Yoshihiko Noda =

Japanese government from 2011 to 2012

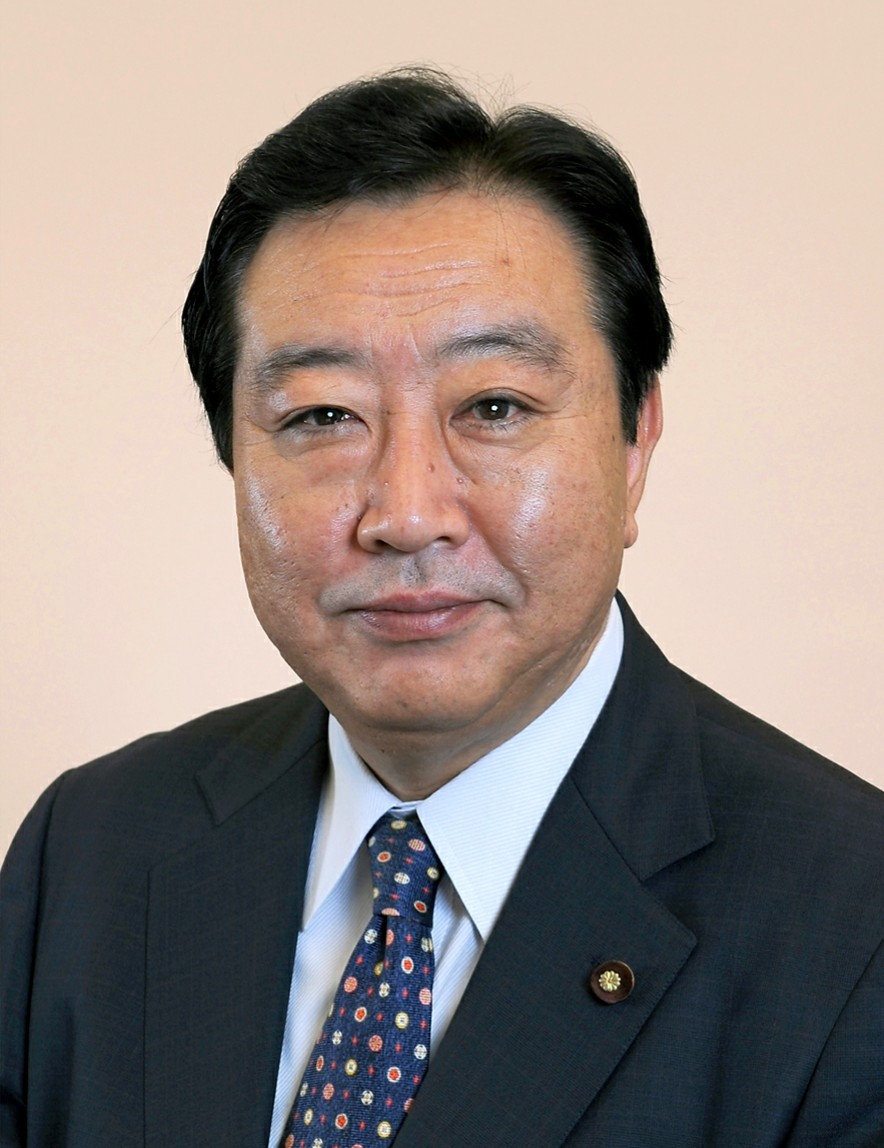
- Official portrait, 2011
- Premiership of Yoshihiko Noda; 2 September 2011 – 26 December 2012
- Monarch: Akihito
- Cabinet: Noda cabinet
- Party: Democratic
- Election: 2012
- Seat: Naikaku Sōri Daijin Kantei
- Constituency: Chiba 4th
- Emblem of the Government of Japan

Yoshihiko Noda's tenure as prime minister of Japan began on 2 September 2011 when he was officially appointed prime minister by Emperor Akihito in a ceremony at the Tokyo Imperial Palace. Following a severe loss for the DPJ in the December 2012 general election, Noda announced his resignation as party leader, triggering a leadership election that was won by Banri Kaieda. Noda was succeeded as Prime Minister by Shinzo Abe, President of the Liberal Democratic Party, on 26 December 2012.

== Democratic Party leadership bid ==
After Naoto Kan's resignation in August 2011, Noda stood as a candidate in the party election to replace him. He won a runoff vote against Banri Kaieda in the leadership election, making him the presumptive prime minister. He inherited the challenge of the 2011 Tōhoku earthquake and tsunami reconstruction plans.

During the party caucus making the leadership decision, Noda made a 15-minute speech in which he summarized his political career by comparing himself to dojo loach, a kind of bottom-feeding fish. Paraphrasing a poem by Mitsuo Aida, he said, "I'll never be a goldfish in a scarlet robe, but like a loach in muddy waters. I'll work hard for the people, to move politics forward." The "loach speech" was popular among his colleagues and cemented his political reputation at the start of his term.

Noda told his foreign policy and was said to have close relations with the United States, and stressed the importance of the US-Japan security alliance in August 2011 speech. On 15 August 2011 —the anniversary of the Surrender of Japan in World War II, he said that Japan's class A war criminals convicted by the Allies were not legally war criminals under his view. As prime minister of Japan, he stated that his position on this issue would follow the standard set by previous administrations, and that he did not wish to alter close relationship with China and South Korea.

== Premiership ==
=== Nuclear policy ===
In his first speech as Prime Minister on 2 September 2011, Noda confirmed that the Japanese government would continue to phase out nuclear power, by not building new nuclear power plants nor extending the life spans of outdated ones. In May 2012, nuclear power plants which were sitting idle in the wake of the Fukushima accident were restarted in order to help Japan's immediate demands for energy, despite protests including hundreds of people.

=== Participation in Trans-Pacific Partnership negotiations ===
During premiership of Noda, one of his most important initiatives was pursuing the entry of Japan into the negotiations for the Trans-Pacific Partnership, which he announced on 11 November 2011. This proved controversial and was widely discussed in Japanese society.

=== Senkaku Islands ===
The Tokyo Metropolitan Government under Governor Shintaro Ishihara sought to buy the Senkaku Islands, which are claimed by China and Taiwan. Ishihara wished to build facilities on the islands to more obviously claim them as Japanese territory, a move which the national government under Noda regarded as likely to exacerbate tensions with China. On 27 April 2012 the Tokyo government began raising funds from the public to purchase the islands. By September 2012 1.4 billion yen ($17.8 million) had been raised.

On 24 August, Noda went on live television and vowed to appeal to the international community to support Japan's claims to sovereignty over islands at the center of separate disputes with South Korea and China. On 11 September, the Japanese government nationalized its control over Minami-kojima, Kita-kojima, and Uotsuri islands by purchasing them from the Kurihara family for ¥2.05 billion. China's Foreign Ministry objected saying Beijing would not "sit back and watch its territorial sovereignty violated."

=== Consumption tax increase ===
Another major priority of Noda's was his effort to increase Japan's consumption tax from 5% to 10%. During this struggle Noda said that he "staked his political life" on the passage of the law. The bill passed through the lower house of the diet on 26 June 2012, and passed the upper house on 10 August 2012. On 10 August 2012, Noda survived a no-confidence vote after proposing a five-percent increase in the sales tax. During negotiations for the tax, Noda promised to call an early election "soon". Afterwards, he stated that he had planned to quit as a lawmaker if he had been unable to pass the consumption tax increase.

Noda received praise for passing the consumption tax hike despite intense opposition, but was also criticized for bringing the DPJ closer in substance to its rival LDP, rather than keeping the campaign promises by which it defeated the LDP in 2009. One commentator called him "the best prime minister the LDP never had."

=== Defeat in the 2012 general election ===
On 21 September 2012, Noda won the DPJ's leadership bi-annual election by 818 points out of 1,231. He then said: "I would like to beef up our teamwork so that we can shift the DPJ once again to make it a fighting force that can serve Japan. [I promise to] sweat with all of you to make a vigorous Japan together. The real reform Japan needs is decisive politics when we face issues that need to be decided." His result was seen as more certain after Environment Minister Goshi Hosono stepped back from standing in the election. He defeated former agriculture ministers Michihiko Kano and Hirotaka Akamatsu, as well as former internal affairs minister Kazuhiro Haraguchi.

On 14 November 2012, Noda stated that the diet would be dissolved on 16 November 2012, and the election would be held on 16 December 2012. Given the DPJ's poor figures in the polls, many members of the DPJ were opposed to this, including General Secretary Azuma Koshiishi, and there was talk among some DPJ members of trying to oust Noda before the next election.

The DPJ managed to narrow its polling gap with the LDP prior to the start of the election campaign in December, raising hopes that the DPJ could prevent the LDP from obtaining an outright majority and force a coalition government to be formed. In the wake of the brutal battle surrounding the consumption tax increase, Noda revived the Trans-Pacific Partnership as a campaign issue, making market liberalization the focal point of his campaign strategy.

In the general election, held on 16 December, the LDP enjoyed a resounding victory under the leadership of Shinzo Abe (former prime minister served from 2006 to 2007), winning an outright majority while the DPJ lost around three-fourths of its seats. Noda immediately announced his resignation as president of the DPJ in order to take responsibility for the defeat.
