= August 1898 Japanese general election =

- 10 August 1898

All 300 seats in the House of Representatives 151 seats needed for a majority
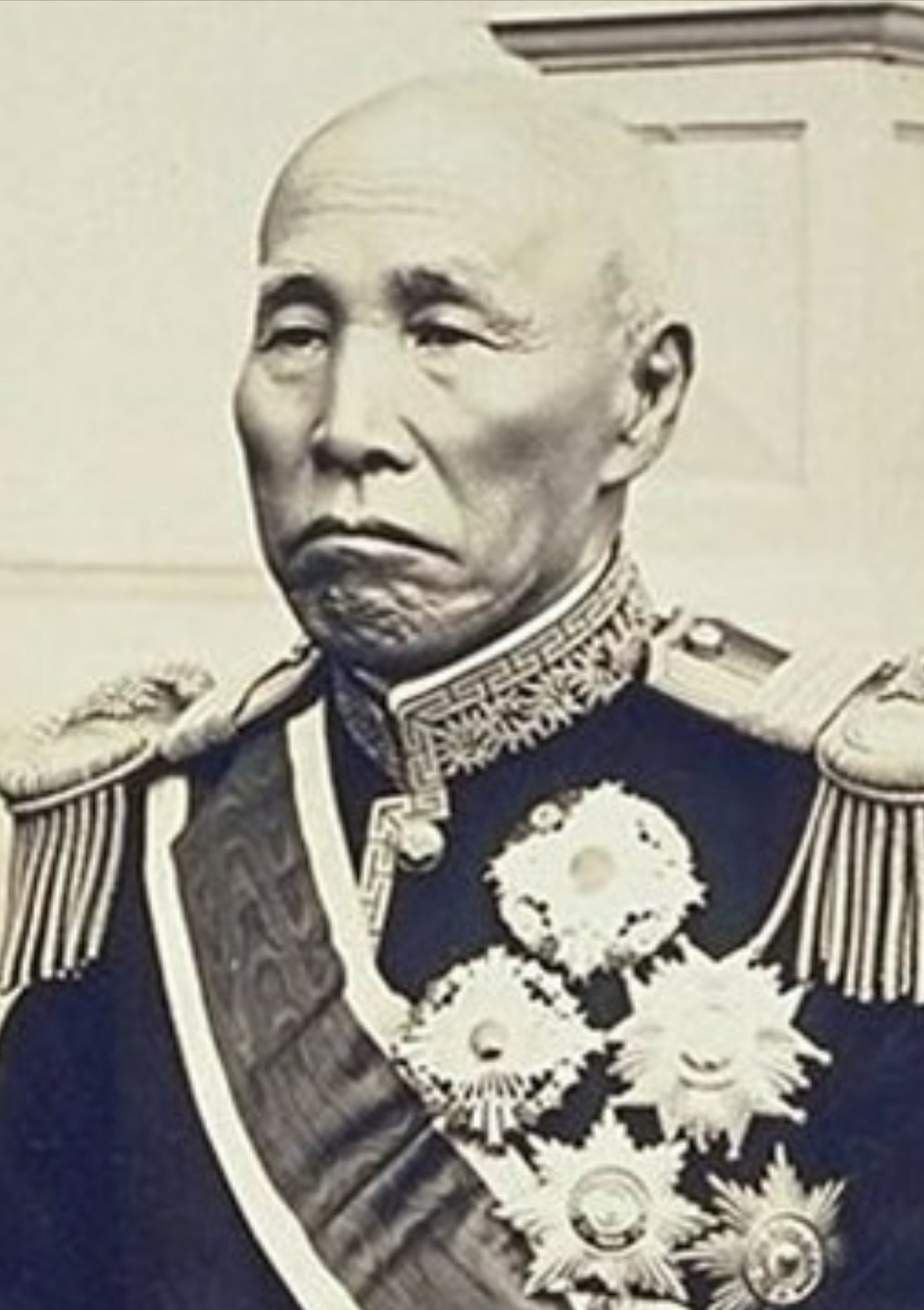

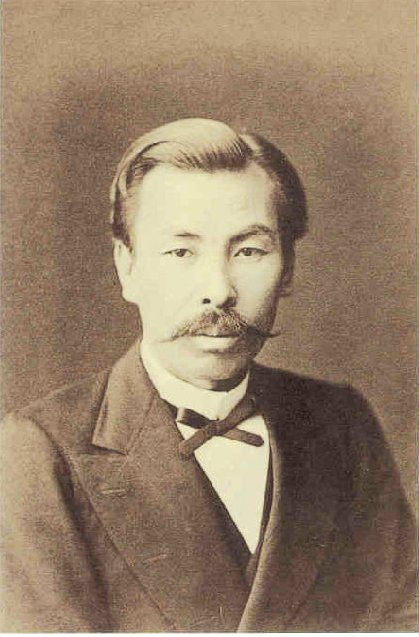

	First party	Second party	Third party
Leader	Ōkuma Shigenobu	Shinagawa Yajirō
Party	Kenseitō	Kokumin Kyōkai	Hiyoshi Club
Last election	208	29	–
Seats won	244	21	9
Seat change	▲36	▼8	New
Prime Minister before election
Ōkuma Shigenobu
Kenseitō
Prime Minister after election
Ōkuma Shigenobu
Kenseitō

General elections were held in Japan on 10 August 1898.

== Results ==
Party	Votes	%	Seats	+/–
Kenseitō			244	+36
Kokumin Kyōkai			21	–8
Hiyoshi Club			9	New
Independents			26	–11
Total			300	0
Total votes	401,390	–		
Registered voters/turnout	502,292	79.91		
Source: Statistics Bureau of Japan
