= Kenseitō =

Kenseitō 憲政党
- Founder and leader: Ōkuma Shigenobu
- Founded: June 22, 1898
- Dissolved: September 13, 1900
- Merger of: Jiyūtō; Shimpotō
- Succeeded by: Kensei Hontō (left-wing faction, 1898); Seiyūkai (right-wing faction)
- Headquarters: Tokyo
- Ideology: Japanese nationalism; National liberalism; Liberalism (Japanese); Anti-Meiji oligarchy; Constitutional protection
- Political position: Centre-left to centre-right (1898); Centre-right(1898–1900)
- Colours: Red, white

The Kenseitō (憲政党; Constitutional Party) was a political party in the Empire of Japan during the Meiji period.

== History ==
The Kenseitō was founded in June 1898, as a merger of the Shimpotō headed by Ōkuma Shigenobu and the Liberal Party (Jiyūtō) led by Itagaki Taisuke, with Ōkuma as party president. The merger gave the new party an overwhelming majority in the Lower House of the Diet of Japan; the two parties had won 208 seats in the March 1898 elections. After the collapse of the Itō administration, Ōkuma became Prime Minister of Japan, despite concerns by Yamagata Aritomo and other members of the Meiji oligarchy and genrō that this would result in a dilution of their authority. One of Ōkuma's first acts as prime minister was to pass much-needed fiscal retrenchment legislation, trimming the number of bureaucrats on the government payroll. However, he was unable to curtail spending for the post-First Sino-Japanese War military expansion program he inherited from the Itō administration.

During the August 1898 general election, the Kenseitō won 260 out of 300 seats contested; however, the party soon collapsed. Members of the former Jiyūtō felt that Ōkuma did not distribute the cabinet seats in fair proportion to their party, and joined with Yamagata Aritomo and other conservative elements in the Diet to criticize Minister of Education Ozaki Yukio for a speech which they felt promoted republicanism. Following Ozaki's resignation, the former Jiyūtō faction continued to attack the government until Ōkuma's cabinet disintegrated.

The former Jiyūtō faction reorganized itself into the New Kenseitō in November 1898 with Itagaki as its president, whilst the former Shimpotō members formed Kensei Hontō. The reformed party allied itself with the new government led by Yamagata, and pushed for land tax reform and expansion of suffrage. The New Kenseitō joined Itō Hirobumi's Rikken Seiyūkai in 1900.

== Election results ==
Election	Leader	Seats	Status
August 1898	Ōkuma Shigenobu	244 / 300	Government
