= List of Japanese cabinets =

This article lists successive Japanese cabinets, from first cabinet, First Itō cabinet to current cabinet, Second Takaichi cabinet.

== Cabinets ==
Order	Cabinet	Dates		Prime Minister	Governing party	Emperor
Order	Cabinet	Constituted	Concluded	Prime Minister	Governing party	Emperor
1	First Itō cabinet	22 December 1885	30 April 1888	Itō Hirobumi	None (Meiji oligarchy)	Meiji (era)
2	Kuroda cabinet	30 April 1888	25 October 1889	Kuroda Kiyotaka	None (Meiji oligarchy)	Meiji (era)
-	Sanjō caretaker cabinet	25 October 1889	24 December 1889	Sanjō Sanetomi	None (Meiji oligarchy)	Meiji (era)
3	First Yamagata cabinet	24 December 1889	6 May 1891	Yamagata Aritomo	None (Meiji oligarchy)	Meiji (era)
4	First Matsukata Cabinet	6 May 1891	8 August 1892	Matsukata Masayoshi	None (Meiji oligarchy)	Meiji (era)
5	Second Itō Cabinet	8 August 1892	18 September 1896	Itō Hirobumi (Note: President of the Privy Council, Kuroda Kiyotaka was the acting prime minister from 31 August 1896 to 18 September 1896.)	None (Alliance with the Liberal Party after the First Sino-Japanese War)	Meiji (era)
6	Second Matsukata Cabinet	18 September 1896	12 January 1898	Matsukata Masayoshi	Shimpotō	Meiji (era)
7	Third Itō Cabinet	12 January 1898	30 June 1898	Itō Hirobumi	None (Meiji oligarchy)	Meiji (era)
8	First Ōkuma Cabinet	30 June 1898	8 November 1898	Ōkuma Shigenobu	Kenseitō	Meiji (era)
9	Second Yamagata Cabinet	8 November 1898	19 October 1900	Yamagata Aritomo	Alliance with Kenseitō	Meiji (era)
10	Fourth Itō Cabinet	19 October 1900	2 June 1901	Itō Hirobumi (Note: President of the Privy Council, Saionji Kinmochi was the acting prime minister from 10 May to 2 June 1901.)	Rikken Seiyūkai	Meiji (era)
11	First Katsura Cabinet	2 June 1901	7 January 1906	Katsura Tarō	None (Bureaucracy)	Meiji (era)
12	First Saionji Cabinet	7 January 1906	14 July 1908	Saionji Kinmochi	Rikken Seiyūkai	Meiji (era)
13	Second Katsura Cabinet	14 July 1908	30 August 1911	Katsura Tarō	Rikken Seiyūkai	Meiji (era)
14	Second Saionji Cabinet	30 August 1911	21 December 1912	Saionji Kinmochi	Rikken Seiyūkai	Meiji (era)
14	Second Saionji Cabinet	30 August 1911	21 December 1912	Saionji Kinmochi	Rikken Seiyūkai	Taishō (era)
15	Third Katsura Cabinet	21 December 1912	20 February 1913	Katsura Tarō	None (Bureaucracy)	Taishō (era)
16	First Yamamoto Cabinet	20 February 1913	16 April 1914	Yamamoto Gonnohyōe	Rikken Seiyūkai	Taishō (era)
17	Second Ōkuma Cabinet	16 April 1914	9 October 1916	Ōkuma Shigenobu	Rikken Dōshikai	Taishō (era)
18	Terauchi Cabinet	9 October 1916	29 September 1918	Terauchi Masatake	None (Bureaucracy)	Taishō (era)
19	Hara Cabinet	29 September 1918	13 November 1921	Hara Takashi (Note: Minister for Foreign Affairs, Uchida Kōsai was the acting prime minister from 4 November to 13 November 1921.)	Rikken Seiyūkai	Taishō (era)
20	Takahashi Cabinet	13 November 1921	12 June 1922	Takahashi Korekiyo	Rikken Seiyūkai	Taishō (era)
21	Katō Tomosaburō Cabinet	12 June 1922	2 September 1923	Katō Tomosaburō (Note: Minister for Foreign Affairs, Uchida Kōsai was the acting prime minister from 24 August to 2 September 1923.)	Rikken Seiyūkai	Taishō (era)
22	Second Yamamoto Cabinet	2 September 1923	7 January 1924	Yamamoto Gonnohyōe	Kakushin Club	Taishō (era)
23	Kiyoura Cabinet	7 January 1924	11 June 1924	Kiyoura Keigo	None (Bureaucracy with support of Seiyūhontō)	Taishō (era)
24	Katō Takaaki Cabinet	11 June 1924	2 August 1925	Katō Takaaki (Note: Minister of Home Affairs, Wakatsuki Reijirō was the acting prime minister from 28 January to 30 January 1923.)	Kenseikai / Rikken Seiyūkai / Kakushin Club	Taishō (era)
24	Katō Takaaki Cabinet	2 August 1925	30 January 1926	Katō Takaaki	Kenseikai	Taishō (era)
25	First Wakatsuki Cabinet	30 January 1926	20 April 1927	Wakatsuki Reijirō	Kenseikai	Taishō (era)
25	First Wakatsuki Cabinet	30 January 1926	20 April 1927	Wakatsuki Reijirō	Kenseikai	Shōwa (era)
26	Tanaka Giichi Cabinet	20 April 1927	2 July 1929	Tanaka Giichi	Rikken Seiyūkai	Shōwa (era)
27	Hamaguchi Cabinet	2 July 1929	14 April 1931	Hamaguchi Osachi (Note: Minister for Foreign Affairs, Kijūrō Shidehara was the acting prime minister from 14 November 1930 to 10 March 1931.)	Rikken Minseitō	Shōwa (era)
28	Second Wakatsuki Cabinet	14 April 1931	13 December 1931	Wakatsuki Reijirō (Note: Minister for Foreign Affairs, Kijūrō Shidehara was the acting prime minister from 14 November 1930 to 10 March 1931.)	Rikken Minseitō	Shōwa (era)
29	Inukai Cabinet	13 December 1931	26 May 1932	Inukai Tsuyoshi (Note: Minister of Finance, Takahashi Korekiyo was the acting prime minister from 16 May to 26 May 1932.)	Rikken Seiyūkai	Shōwa (era)
30	Saitō Cabinet	26 May 1932	8 July 1934	Saitō Makoto	National unity	Shōwa (era)
31	Okada Cabinet	8 July 1934	9 March 1936	Keisuke Okada (Note: Minister of Home Affairs, Fumio Gotō was the acting prime minister from 26 February to 28 February 1936.)	National unity	Shōwa (era)
32	Hirota Cabinet	9 March 1936	2 February 1937	Kōki Hirota	National unity	Shōwa (era)
33	Hayashi Cabinet	2 February 1937	4 June 1937	Senjūrō Hayashi	National unity	Shōwa (era)
34	First Konoe Cabinet	4 June 1937	5 January 1939	Fumimaro Konoe	National unity	Shōwa (era)
35	Hiranuma Cabinet	5 January 1939	30 August 1939	Hiranuma Kiichirō	National unity	Shōwa (era)
36	Nobuyuki Abe Cabinet	30 August 1939	16 January 1940	Nobuyuki Abe	National unity	Shōwa (era)
37	Yonai Cabinet	16 January 1940	22 July 1940	Mitsumasa Yonai	National unity	Shōwa (era)
38	Second Konoe Cabinet	22 July 1940	18 July 1941	Fumimaro Konoe	National unity (Imperial Rule Assistance Association)	Shōwa (era)
39	Third Konoe Cabinet	18 July 1941	18 October 1941	Fumimaro Konoe	National unity (Imperial Rule Assistance Association)	Shōwa (era)
40	Tōjō Cabinet	18 October 1941	22 July 1944	Hideki Tojo	National unity (Imperial Rule Assistance Association)	Shōwa (era)
41	Koiso Cabinet	22 July 1944	7 April 1945	Kuniaki Koiso	National unity (Imperial Rule Assistance Association)	Shōwa (era)
42	Kantarō Suzuki Cabinet	7 April 1945	17 August 1945	Kantarō Suzuki	National unity (Imperial Rule Assistance Association)	Shōwa (era)
43	Higashikuni Cabinet	17 August 1945	9 October 1945	Prince Naruhiko Higashikuni	National unity	Shōwa (era)
43	Higashikuni Cabinet	17 August 1945	9 October 1945	Prince Naruhiko Higashikuni	National unity (Allied Occupation since 28 August 1945)	Shōwa (era)
44	Shidehara Cabinet	9 October 1945	22 May 1946	Kijūrō Shidehara	Japan Progressive / Japan Liberal (Allied Occupation)	Shōwa (era)
45	First Yoshida Cabinet	22 May 1946	24 May 1947	Shigeru Yoshida	Japan Liberal / Japan Progressive (Allied Occupation)	Shōwa (era)
46	Katayama Cabinet	24 May 1947	10 March 1948	Tetsu Katayama	Japan Socialist / Democratic / National Cooperative (Allied Occupation)	Shōwa (era)
47	Ashida Cabinet	10 March 1948	15 October 1948	Hitoshi Ashida	Democratic / Japan Socialist / National Cooperative (Allied Occupation)	Shōwa (era)
48	Second Yoshida Cabinet	15 October 1948	16 February 1949	Shigeru Yoshida	Democratic Liberal (Allied Occupation)	Shōwa (era)
49	Third Yoshida Cabinet	16 February 1949	1 June 1949	Shigeru Yoshida	Democratic Liberal / Democratic (until 1 March 1950) (Allied Occupation)	Shōwa (era)
49	Reorganized Cabinet	1 June 1949	28 June 1950	Shigeru Yoshida	Democratic Liberal / Democratic (until 1 March 1950) (Allied Occupation)	Shōwa (era)
49	Reorganized Cabinet	1 June 1949	28 June 1950	Shigeru Yoshida	Liberal (since 1 March 1950) (Allied Occupation)	Shōwa (era)
49	First Reshuffled Cabinet	28 June 1950	4 July 1951	Shigeru Yoshida	Liberal (since 1 March 1950) (Allied Occupation)	Shōwa (era)
49	Second Reshuffled Cabinet	4 July 1951	26 December 1951	Shigeru Yoshida	Liberal (since 1 March 1950) (Allied Occupation)	Shōwa (era)
49	Third Reshuffled Cabinet	26 December 1951	30 October 1952	Shigeru Yoshida	Liberal (Allied Occupation until 28 April 1952)	Shōwa (era)
49	Third Reshuffled Cabinet	26 December 1951	30 October 1952	Shigeru Yoshida	Liberal	Shōwa (era)
50	Fourth Yoshida Cabinet	30 October 1952	21 May 1953	Shigeru Yoshida	Liberal	Shōwa (era)
51	Fifth Yoshida Cabinet	21 May 1953	10 December 1954	Shigeru Yoshida	Liberal (confidence and supply: Kaishintō)	Shōwa (era)
52	First Ichirō Hatoyama Cabinet	10 December 1954	19 March 1955	Ichirō Hatoyama	Japan Democratic	Shōwa (era)
53	Second Ichirō Hatoyama Cabinet	19 March 1955	22 November 1955	Ichirō Hatoyama	Japan Democratic	Shōwa (era)
54	Third Ichirō Hatoyama Cabinet	22 November 1955	23 December 1956	Ichirō Hatoyama	Liberal Democratic	Shōwa (era)
55	Ishibashi Cabinet	23 December 1956	25 February 1957	Tanzan Ishibashi	Liberal Democratic	Shōwa (era)
56	First Kishi Cabinet	25 February 1957	10 July 1957	Nobusuke Kishi	Liberal Democratic	Shōwa (era)
56	Reshuffled Cabinet	10 July 1957	12 June 1958	Nobusuke Kishi	Liberal Democratic	Shōwa (era)
57	Second Kishi Cabinet	12 June 1958	18 June 1959	Nobusuke Kishi	Liberal Democratic	Shōwa (era)
57	Reshuffled Cabinet	18 June 1959	19 July 1960	Nobusuke Kishi	Liberal Democratic	Shōwa (era)
58	First Ikeda Cabinet	19 July 1960	8 December 1960	Hayato Ikeda	Liberal Democratic	Shōwa (era)
59	Second Ikeda Cabinet	8 December 1960	18 July 1961	Hayato Ikeda	Liberal Democratic	Shōwa (era)
59	First Reshuffled Cabinet	18 July 1961	18 July 1962	Hayato Ikeda	Liberal Democratic	Shōwa (era)
59	Second Reshuffled Cabinet	18 July 1962	18 July 1963	Hayato Ikeda	Liberal Democratic	Shōwa (era)
59	Third Reshuffled Cabinet	18 July 1963	9 December 1963	Hayato Ikeda	Liberal Democratic	Shōwa (era)
60	Third Ikeda Cabinet	9 December 1963	18 July 1964	Hayato Ikeda	Liberal Democratic	Shōwa (era)
60	Reshuffled Cabinet	18 July 1964	9 November 1964	Hayato Ikeda	Liberal Democratic	Shōwa (era)
61	First Satō Cabinet	9 November 1964	3 June 1965	Eisaku Satō	Liberal Democratic	Shōwa (era)
61	First Reshuffled Cabinet	3 June 1965	1 August 1966	Eisaku Satō	Liberal Democratic	Shōwa (era)
61	Second Reshuffled Cabinet	1 August 1966	3 December 1966	Eisaku Satō	Liberal Democratic	Shōwa (era)
61	Third Reshuffled Cabinet	3 December 1966	17 February 1967	Eisaku Satō	Liberal Democratic	Shōwa (era)
62	Second Satō Cabinet	17 February 1967	25 November 1967	Eisaku Satō	Liberal Democratic	Shōwa (era)
62	First Reshuffled Cabinet	25 November 1967	30 November 1968	Eisaku Satō	Liberal Democratic	Shōwa (era)
62	Second Reshuffled Cabinet	30 November 1968	14 January 1970	Eisaku Satō	Liberal Democratic	Shōwa (era)
63	Third Satō Cabinet	14 January 1970	5 July 1971	Eisaku Satō	Liberal Democratic	Shōwa (era)
63	Reshuffled Cabinet	5 July 1971	7 July 1972	Eisaku Satō	Liberal Democratic	Shōwa (era)
64	First Tanaka Cabinet	7 July 1972	22 December 1972	Kakuei Tanaka	Liberal Democratic	Shōwa (era)
65	Second Tanaka Cabinet	22 December 1972	25 November 1973	Kakuei Tanaka	Liberal Democratic	Shōwa (era)
65	First Reshuffled Cabinet	25 November 1973	11 November 1974	Kakuei Tanaka	Liberal Democratic	Shōwa (era)
65	Second Reshuffled Cabinet	11 November 1974	9 December 1974	Kakuei Tanaka	Liberal Democratic	Shōwa (era)
66	Miki Cabinet	9 December 1974	15 September 1976	Takeo Miki	Liberal Democratic	Shōwa (era)
66	Reshuffled Cabinet	15 September 1976	24 December 1976	Takeo Miki	Liberal Democratic	Shōwa (era)
67	Takeo Fukuda Cabinet	24 December 1976	28 November 1977	Takeo Fukuda	Liberal Democratic	Shōwa (era)
67	Reshuffled Cabinet	28 November 1977	7 December 1978	Takeo Fukuda	Liberal Democratic	Shōwa (era)
68	First Ōhira Cabinet	7 December 1978	9 November 1979	Masayoshi Ōhira (Note: Chief Cabinet Secretary, Masayoshi Ito was the acting prime minister from 12 June to 17 July 1980.)	Liberal Democratic	Shōwa (era)
69	Second Ōhira Cabinet	9 November 1979	17 July 1980	Masayoshi Ōhira	Liberal Democratic (confidence and supply: New Liberal Club)	Shōwa (era)
70	Zenkō Suzuki Cabinet	17 July 1980	30 November 1981	Zenkō Suzuki	Liberal Democratic	Shōwa (era)
70	Reshuffled Cabinet	30 November 1981	27 November 1982	Zenkō Suzuki	Liberal Democratic	Shōwa (era)
71	First Nakasone Cabinet	27 November 1982	27 December 1983	Yasuhiro Nakasone	Liberal Democratic	Shōwa (era)
72	Second Nakasone Cabinet	27 December 1983	1 November 1984	Yasuhiro Nakasone	Liberal Democratic / New Liberal Club	Shōwa (era)
72	First Reshuffled Cabinet	1 November 1984	28 December 1985	Yasuhiro Nakasone	Liberal Democratic / New Liberal Club	Shōwa (era)
72	Second Reshuffled Cabinet	28 December 1985	22 July 1986	Yasuhiro Nakasone	Liberal Democratic / New Liberal Club	Shōwa (era)
73	Third Nakasone Cabinet	22 July 1986	6 November 1987	Yasuhiro Nakasone	Liberal Democratic	Shōwa (era)
74	Takeshita Cabinet	6 November 1987	27 December 1988	Noboru Takeshita	Liberal Democratic	Shōwa (era)
74	Reshuffled Cabinet	27 December 1988	3 June 1989	Noboru Takeshita	Liberal Democratic	Shōwa (era)
74	Reshuffled Cabinet	27 December 1988	3 June 1989	Noboru Takeshita	Liberal Democratic	Akihito (Heisei) (era)
75	Uno Cabinet	3 June 1989	10 August 1989	Sōsuke Uno	Liberal Democratic	Akihito (Heisei) (era)
76	First Kaifu Cabinet	10 August 1989	28 February 1990	Toshiki Kaifu	Liberal Democratic	Akihito (Heisei) (era)
77	Second Kaifu Cabinet	28 February 1990	29 December 1990	Toshiki Kaifu	Liberal Democratic	Akihito (Heisei) (era)
77	Reshuffled Cabinet	29 December 1990	5 November 1991	Toshiki Kaifu	Liberal Democratic	Akihito (Heisei) (era)
78	Miyazawa Cabinet	5 November 1991	12 December 1992	Kiichi Miyazawa	Liberal Democratic	Akihito (Heisei) (era)
78	Reshuffled Cabinet	12 December 1992	9 August 1993	Kiichi Miyazawa	Liberal Democratic	Akihito (Heisei) (era)
79	Hosokawa Cabinet	9 August 1993	28 April 1994	Morihiro Hosokawa	Japan New / Japan Socialist / Japan Renewal / Komeito / New Party Sakigake / Democratic Socialist / Socialist Democratic Federation / Democratic Reform Party (House of Councillors)	Akihito (Heisei) (era)
80	Hata Cabinet	28 April 1994	30 June 1994	Tsutomu Hata	Japan Renewal / Komeito / Japan New / Democratic Socialist / Liberal / Reform League / Democratic Reform Party (House of Councillors) (confidence and supply: New Party Sakigake / New Party Future / Socialist Democratic Federation)	Akihito (Heisei) (era)
81	Murayama Cabinet	30 June 1994	8 August 1995	Tomiichi Murayama	Japan Socialist / Liberal Democratic / New Party Sakigake	Akihito (Heisei) (era)
81	Reshuffled Cabinet	8 August 1995	11 January 1996	Tomiichi Murayama	Japan Socialist / Liberal Democratic / New Party Sakigake	Akihito (Heisei) (era)
82	First Hashimoto cabinet	11 January 1996	7 November 1996	Ryutaro Hashimoto	Liberal Democratic / Japan Socialist (until 19 January 1996) / New Party Sakigake	Akihito (Heisei) (era)
82	First Hashimoto cabinet	11 January 1996	7 November 1996	Ryutaro Hashimoto	Liberal Democratic / Social Democratic (since 19 January 1996) / New Party Sakigake	Akihito (Heisei) (era)
83	Second Hashimoto cabinet	7 November 1996	11 September 1997	Ryutaro Hashimoto	Liberal Democratic (confidence and supply: Social Democratic / New Party Sakigake) (until 1 June 1998)	Akihito (Heisei) (era)
83	Reshuffled cabinet	11 September 1997	30 July 1998	Ryutaro Hashimoto	Liberal Democratic (confidence and supply: Social Democratic / New Party Sakigake) (until 1 June 1998)	Akihito (Heisei) (era)
83	Reshuffled cabinet	11 September 1997	30 July 1998	Ryutaro Hashimoto	Liberal Democratic	Akihito (Heisei) (era)
84	Obuchi cabinet	30 July 1998	14 January 1999	Keizō Obuchi (Note: Chief Cabinet Secretary, Mikio Aoki was the acting prime minister from 3 April to 5 April 2000.)	Liberal Democratic	Akihito (Heisei) (era)
84	First reshuffled cabinet	14 January 1999	5 October 1999	Keizō Obuchi	Liberal Democratic / Liberal	Akihito (Heisei) (era)
84	Second reshuffled cabinet	5 October 1999	5 April 2000	Keizō Obuchi	Liberal Democratic / Liberal (until 1 April 2000) / Komeito	Akihito (Heisei) (era)
84	Second reshuffled cabinet	5 October 1999	5 April 2000	Keizō Obuchi	Liberal Democratic / New Conservative Party (First) (since 1 April 2000) / Komeito	Akihito (Heisei) (era)
85	First Mori cabinet	5 April 2000	4 July 2000	Yoshirō Mori	Liberal Democratic / Komeito / New Conservative Party (First) (until 25 December 2002)	Akihito (Heisei) (era)
86	Second Mori cabinet	4 July 2000	5 December 2000	Yoshirō Mori	Liberal Democratic / Komeito / New Conservative Party (First) (until 25 December 2002)	Akihito (Heisei) (era)
86	Reshuffled cabinet before 2001 CGR	5 December 2000	6 January 2001	Yoshirō Mori	Liberal Democratic / Komeito / New Conservative Party (First) (until 25 December 2002)	Akihito (Heisei) (era)
86	Reshuffled cabinet after 2001 CGR	6 January 2001	26 April 2001	Yoshirō Mori	Liberal Democratic / Komeito / New Conservative Party (First) (until 25 December 2002)	Akihito (Heisei) (era)
87	First Koizumi cabinet	26 April 2001	30 September 2002	Junichiro Koizumi	Liberal Democratic / Komeito / New Conservative Party (First) (until 25 December 2002)	Akihito (Heisei) (era)
87	First reshuffled cabinet	30 September 2002	22 September 2003	Junichiro Koizumi	Liberal Democratic / Komeito / New Conservative Party (First) (until 25 December 2002)	Akihito (Heisei) (era)
87	First reshuffled cabinet	30 September 2002	22 September 2003	Junichiro Koizumi	Liberal Democratic / Komeito / New Conservative Party (Second) (since 25 December 2002)	Akihito (Heisei) (era)
87	Second reshuffled cabinet	22 September 2003	19 November 2003	Junichiro Koizumi	Liberal Democratic / Komeito / New Conservative Party (Second) (since 25 December 2002)	Akihito (Heisei) (era)
88	Second Koizumi cabinet	19 November 2003	27 September 2004	Junichiro Koizumi	Liberal Democratic / Komeito	Akihito (Heisei) (era)
88	Reshuffled cabinet	27 September 2004	21 September 2005	Junichiro Koizumi	Liberal Democratic / Komeito	Akihito (Heisei) (era)
89	Third Koizumi cabinet	21 September 2005	31 October 2005	Junichiro Koizumi	Liberal Democratic / Komeito	Akihito (Heisei) (era)
89	Reshuffled cabinet	31 October 2005	26 September 2006	Junichiro Koizumi	Liberal Democratic / Komeito	Akihito (Heisei) (era)
90	First Abe cabinet	26 September 2006	27 August 2007	Shinzo Abe	Liberal Democratic / Komeito	Akihito (Heisei) (era)
90	Reshuffled cabinet	27 August 2007	26 September 2007	Shinzo Abe	Liberal Democratic / Komeito	Akihito (Heisei) (era)
91	Yasuo Fukuda cabinet	26 September 2007	2 August 2008	Yasuo Fukuda	Liberal Democratic / Komeito	Akihito (Heisei) (era)
91	Reshuffled cabinet	2 August 2008	24 September 2008	Yasuo Fukuda	Liberal Democratic / Komeito	Akihito (Heisei) (era)
92	Asō cabinet	24 September 2008	16 September 2009	Tarō Asō	Liberal Democratic / Komeito	Akihito (Heisei) (era)
93	Yukio Hatoyama cabinet	16 September 2009	8 June 2010	Yukio Hatoyama	Democratic / Social Democratic (until 31 May 2010) / People's New	Akihito (Heisei) (era)
94	Kan cabinet	8 June 2010	17 September 2010	Naoto Kan	Democratic / People's New	Akihito (Heisei) (era)
94	First reshuffled cabinet	17 September 2010	14 January 2011	Naoto Kan	Democratic / People's New	Akihito (Heisei) (era)
94	Second reshuffled cabinet	14 January 2011	2 September 2011	Naoto Kan	Democratic / People's New	Akihito (Heisei) (era)
95	Noda cabinet	2 September 2011	13 January 2012	Yoshihiko Noda	Democratic / People's New	Akihito (Heisei) (era)
95	First reshuffled cabinet	13 January 2012	4 June 2012	Yoshihiko Noda	Democratic / People's New	Akihito (Heisei) (era)
95	Second reshuffled cabinet	4 June 2012	1 October 2012	Yoshihiko Noda	Democratic / People's New	Akihito (Heisei) (era)
95	Third reshuffled cabinet	1 October 2012	26 December 2012	Yoshihiko Noda	Democratic / People's New	Akihito (Heisei) (era)
96	Second Abe cabinet	26 December 2012	3 September 2014	Shinzo Abe	Liberal Democratic / Komeito	Akihito (Heisei) (era)
96	Reshuffled cabinet	3 September 2014	24 December 2014	Shinzo Abe	Liberal Democratic / Komeito	Akihito (Heisei) (era)
97	Third Abe cabinet	24 December 2014	7 October 2015	Shinzo Abe	Liberal Democratic / Komeito	Akihito (Heisei) (era)
97	First reshuffled cabinet	7 October 2015	3 August 2016	Shinzo Abe	Liberal Democratic / Komeito	Akihito (Heisei) (era)
97	Second reshuffled cabinet	3 August 2016	3 August 2017	Shinzo Abe	Liberal Democratic / Komeito	Akihito (Heisei) (era)
97	Third reshuffled cabinet	3 August 2017	1 November 2017	Shinzo Abe	Liberal Democratic / Komeito	Akihito (Heisei) (era)
98	Fourth Abe cabinet	1 November 2017	2 October 2018	Shinzo Abe	Liberal Democratic / Komeito	Akihito (Heisei) (era)
98	First reshuffled cabinet	2 October 2018	11 September 2019	Shinzo Abe	Liberal Democratic / Komeito	Akihito (Heisei) (era)
98	First reshuffled cabinet	2 October 2018	11 September 2019	Shinzo Abe	Liberal Democratic / Komeito	Naruhito (Reiwa) (era)
98	Second reshuffled cabinet	11 September 2019	16 September 2020	Shinzo Abe	Liberal Democratic / Komeito	Naruhito (Reiwa) (era)
99	Suga cabinet	16 September 2020	4 October 2021	Yoshihide Suga	Liberal Democratic / Komeito	Naruhito (Reiwa) (era)
100	First Kishida cabinet	4 October 2021	10 November 2021	Fumio Kishida	Liberal Democratic / Komeito	Naruhito (Reiwa) (era)
101	Second Kishida cabinet	10 November 2021	10 August 2022	Fumio Kishida	Liberal Democratic / Komeito	Naruhito (Reiwa) (era)
101	First reshuffled cabinet	10 August 2022	13 September 2023	Fumio Kishida	Liberal Democratic / Komeito	Naruhito (Reiwa) (era)
101	Second reshuffled cabinet	13 September 2023	1 October 2024	Fumio Kishida	Liberal Democratic / Komeito	Naruhito (Reiwa) (era)
102	First Ishiba cabinet	1 October 2024	11 November 2024	Shigeru Ishiba	Liberal Democratic / Komeito	Naruhito (Reiwa) (era)
103	Second Ishiba cabinet	11 November 2024	21 October 2025	Shigeru Ishiba	Liberal Democratic / Komeito	Naruhito (Reiwa) (era)
104	First Takaichi cabinet	21 October 2025	18 February 2026	Sanae Takaichi	Liberal Democratic (confidence and supply: Ishin)	Naruhito (Reiwa) (era)
105	Second Takaichi cabinet	18 February 2026	17 September 2026	Sanae Takaichi	Liberal Democratic (confidence and supply: Ishin)	Naruhito (Reiwa) (era)
105	Reshuffled cabinet	17 September 2026	Incumbent	Sanae Takaichi	Liberal Democratic / Ishin	Naruhito (Reiwa) (era)

== See also ==
- Government of Japan
