= Third Nakasone cabinet =

Cabinet of Japan (1986–1987)

Third Nakasone Cabinet
- 73rd Cabinet of Japan

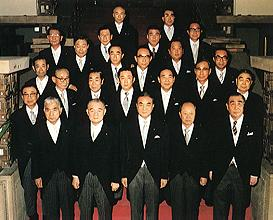
- Date formed: July 22, 1986
- Date dissolved: November 6, 1987

People and organisations
- Emperor: Shōwa
- Prime Minister: Yasuhiro Nakasone
- Member party: Liberal Democratic Party
- Status in legislature: Majority government (Lower House)
- Opposition parties: Japan Socialist Party; Kōmeitō; Democratic Socialist Party; Japanese Communist Party

History
- Predecessor: Second Nakasone Cabinet (Second Reshuffle)
- Successor: Takeshita Cabinet

The Third Nakasone Cabinet is the 73rd Cabinet of Japan headed by Yasuhiro Nakasone from July 22, 1986, to November 6, 1987.

== Cabinet ==
Portfolio	Minister	Special mission etc.	Note
Prime Minister	Yasuhiro Nakasone		
Minister of State	Shin Kanemaru	In charge of introducing private sector vitality Deputy Prime Minister	
Minister of Justice	Kaname Endō		
Minister for Foreign Affairs	Tadashi Kuranari		
Minister of Finance	Kiichi Miyazawa		
Minister of Education	Masayuki Fujio		Dismissed on September 9, 1986
Minister of Education	Masajuro Shiokawa		Appointed on September 9, 1986
Minister of Health	Jūrō Saitō	In charge of Pension issues	
Minister of Agriculture, Forestry and Fisheries	Mutsuki Katō		
Minister of International Trade and Industry	Hajime Tamura		
Minister of Transport	Ryutaro Hashimoto	In charge of New Tokyo International Airport issues	
Minister of Posts	Shunjirō Karasawa		
Minister of Labor	Takushi Hirai		
Minister of Construction	Kōsei Amano		
Minister of Home Affairs; Chair of the National Public Safety Commission	Nobuyuki Hanashi		
Chief Cabinet Secretary	Masaharu Gotōda		
Director of the Management and Coordination Agency	Kazuo Tamaki		Died on January 25, 1987
Director of the Management and Coordination Agency	Masaharu Gotōda		Acting General; Appointed on January 25, 1987; Resigned on January 26, 1987
Director of the Management and Coordination Agency	Tokuo Yamashita		Appointed on January 26, 1987
Director of the Hokkaido Regional Development Agency; Director of the Okinawa Regional Development Agency; Director of the National Land Agency	Tamisuke Watanuki		
Director of the Defense Agency	Yūkō Kurihara		
Director of the Economic Planning Agency	Tetsuo Kondo		
Director of the Science and Technology Agency	Yatarō Mitsubayashi	Chair of the Atomic Energy Commission	
Director of the Environment Agency	Toshiyuki Inamura		
Director-General of the Cabinet Legislation Bureau	Osamu Mimura		
Deputy Chief Cabinet Secretary (for Political Affairs)	Hideo Watanabe		
Deputy Chief Cabinet Secretary (for General Affairs)	Shōichi Fujimori		
