= Deputy Prime Minister of Japan =

- 副総理
- Emblem of the Government of Japan

- Incumbent; Vacant since 4 October 2021
- Style: Mr. Deputy Prime Minister
- Member of: Cabinet; National Security Council
- Appointer: The Prime Minister
- Term length: No fixed term
- Inaugural holder: Kijūrō Shidehara
- Formation: 3 May 1947
- Succession: First
- Salary: ¥20,916,000

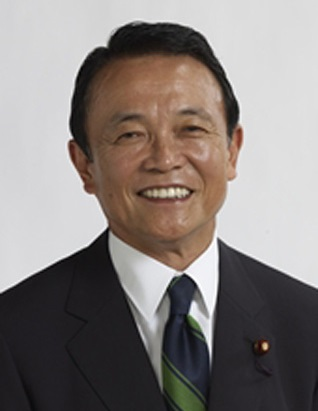
Tarō Asō, the most recent, and longest-serving deputy prime minister of Japan

The deputy prime minister of Japan (副総理, Fuku-sōri) is a post given to a minister of state designated by the prime minister of Japan to temporarily perform the prime minister's duties when they are not able to. The prime minister does not have to designate a successor, and as such the position is not always filled.

The position has been vacant since 4 October 2021, but the most recent, and longest serving, deputy prime minister was Tarō Asō, who served as minister of finance concurrently. The deputy prime minister only exercises the functions of prime minister until the National Diet selects a new prime minister.

== List of deputy prime ministers of Japan ==
Portrait	Name Office (Lifespan)	Term of office			Party	Prime Minister (Term of office)	Government
Portrait	Name Office (Lifespan)	Took office	Left office	Duration	Party	Prime Minister (Term of office)	Government
	Kijūrō Shidehara 幣原 喜重郎; Rep for Osaka 3rd (1872–1951)	3 May 1947	24 May 1947	22 days	Japan Progressive	Shigeru Yoshida (1946–1947)	Yoshida I
Vacant (24 May – 1 June 1947)						Tetsu Katayama (1947–1948)	Katayama
photograph	Hitoshi Ashida 蘆田 均 Rep for Kyōto 2nd (1887–1959)	1 June 1947	10 March 1948	284 days	Democratic	Tetsu Katayama (1947–1948)	Katayama
	Suehiro Nishio 西尾 末広; Rep for Osaka 2nd (1891–1981)	10 March 1948	6 July 1948	119 days	Socialist	Hitoshi Ashida (1948)	Ashida
Vacant (6 July – 19 October 1948)						Hitoshi Ashida (1948)	Ashida
Vacant (6 July – 19 October 1948)						Shigeru Yoshida (1948–1954)	Yoshida II
	Jōji Hayashi 林 譲治; Rep for Kōchi at-large (1889–1960)	19 October 1948	13 March 1951	2 years, 146 days	Democratic Liberal	Shigeru Yoshida (1948–1954)	Yoshida II
	Jōji Hayashi 林 譲治; Rep for Kōchi at-large (1889–1960)	19 October 1948	13 March 1951	2 years, 146 days	Democratic Liberal	Shigeru Yoshida (1948–1954)	Yoshida III
	Jōji Hayashi 林 譲治; Rep for Kōchi at-large (1889–1960)	19 October 1948	13 March 1951	2 years, 146 days	Liberal	Shigeru Yoshida (1948–1954)	Yoshida III
Vacant (13 March 1951 – 28 November 1952)						Shigeru Yoshida (1948–1954)	Yoshida III
Vacant (13 March 1951 – 28 November 1952)						Shigeru Yoshida (1948–1954)	Yoshida IV
	Taketora Ogata 緒方 竹虎; Rep for Fukuoka 1st (1888–1956)	28 November 1952	10 December 1954	2 years, 13 days	Liberal	Shigeru Yoshida (1948–1954)	Yoshida IV
	Taketora Ogata 緒方 竹虎; Rep for Fukuoka 1st (1888–1956)	28 November 1952	10 December 1954	2 years, 13 days	Liberal	Shigeru Yoshida (1948–1954)	Yoshida V
	Mamoru Shigemitsu 重光 葵 Rep for Ōita 2nd (1887–1957)	10 December 1954	23 December 1956	2 years, 14 days	Japan Democratic	Ichirō Hatoyama (1954–1956)	Hatoyama I. I
	Mamoru Shigemitsu 重光 葵 Rep for Ōita 2nd (1887–1957)	10 December 1954	23 December 1956	2 years, 14 days	Japan Democratic	Ichirō Hatoyama (1954–1956)	Hatoyama I. II
	Mamoru Shigemitsu 重光 葵 Rep for Ōita 2nd (1887–1957)	10 December 1954	23 December 1956	2 years, 14 days	Liberal Democratic	Ichirō Hatoyama (1954–1956)	Hatoyama I. II
	Mamoru Shigemitsu 重光 葵 Rep for Ōita 2nd (1887–1957)	10 December 1954	23 December 1956	2 years, 14 days	Liberal Democratic	Ichirō Hatoyama (1954–1956)	Hatoyama I. III
Vacant (23 December 1956 – 20 May 1957)						Tanzan Ishibashi (1956–1957)	Ishibashi
Vacant (23 December 1956 – 20 May 1957)						Nobusuke Kishi (1957–1960)	Kishi I
	Mitsujirō Ishii 石井 光次郎; Rep for Fukuoka 3rd (1889–1981)	20 May 1957	12 June 1958	1 year, 24 days	Liberal Democratic	Nobusuke Kishi (1957–1960)	Kishi I
Vacant (12 June 1958 – 18 June 1959)						Nobusuke Kishi (1957–1960)	Kishi II
	Shūji Masutani 益谷 秀次; Rep for Ishikawa 2nd (1888–1973)	18 June 1959	19 July 1960	1 year, 32 days	Liberal Democratic	Nobusuke Kishi (1957–1960)	Kishi II
Vacant (19 July 1960 – 29 August 1972)						Hayato Ikeda (1960–1964)	Ikeda I
Vacant (19 July 1960 – 29 August 1972)						Hayato Ikeda (1960–1964)	Ikeda II
Vacant (19 July 1960 – 29 August 1972)						Hayato Ikeda (1960–1964)	Ikeda III
Vacant (19 July 1960 – 29 August 1972)						Eisaku Satō (1964–1972)	Satō I
Vacant (19 July 1960 – 29 August 1972)						Eisaku Satō (1964–1972)	Satō II
Vacant (19 July 1960 – 29 August 1972)						Eisaku Satō (1964–1972)	Satō III
Vacant (19 July 1960 – 29 August 1972)						Kakuei Tanaka (1972–1974)	Tanaka K. I
	Takeo Miki 三木 武夫; Rep for Tokushima at-large (1907–1988)	29 August 1972	12 July 1974	1 year, 318 days	Liberal Democratic	Kakuei Tanaka (1972–1974)	Tanaka K. I
	Takeo Miki 三木 武夫; Rep for Tokushima at-large (1907–1988)	29 August 1972	12 July 1974	1 year, 318 days	Liberal Democratic	Kakuei Tanaka (1972–1974)	Tanaka K. II
Vacant (12 July – 9 December 1974)						Kakuei Tanaka (1972–1974)	Tanaka K. II
	Takeo Fukuda 福田 赳夫; Rep for Gunma 3rd (1905–1995)	9 December 1974	6 November 1976	1 year, 334 days	Liberal Democratic	Takeo Miki (1974–1976)	Miki
Vacant (6 November 1976 – 11 June 1980)						Takeo Miki (1974–1976)	Miki
Vacant (6 November 1976 – 11 June 1980)						Takeo Fukuda (1976–1978)	Fukuda T.
Vacant (6 November 1976 – 11 June 1980)						Masayoshi Ōhira (1978–1980)	Ōhira I
Vacant (6 November 1976 – 11 June 1980)						Masayoshi Ōhira (1978–1980)	Ōhira II
photograph	Masayoshi Ito (Note: Masayoshi Ito was Acting Prime Minister from 12 June until 17 July 1980.) 伊東 正義; Rep for Fukushima 2nd (1910–1980)	12 June 1980	17 July 1980	36 days	Liberal Democratic	Masayoshi Ōhira (1978–1980)	Ōhira II
photograph	Masayoshi Ito 伊東 正義; Rep for Fukushima 2nd (1910–1980)	12 June 1980	17 July 1980	36 days	Liberal Democratic	Masayoshi Ito (1980)	Ōhira II
Vacant (17 July 1980 – 22 July 1986)						Zenkō Suzuki (1980–1982)	Suzuki Z.
Vacant (17 July 1980 – 22 July 1986)						Yasuhiro Nakasone (1982–1987)	Nakasone I
Vacant (17 July 1980 – 22 July 1986)						Yasuhiro Nakasone (1982–1987)	Nakasone II
	Shin Kanemaru 金丸 信 Rep for Yamanashi at-large (1914–1996)	22 July 1986	6 November 1987	1 year, 108 days	Liberal Democratic	Yasuhiro Nakasone (1982–1987)	Nakasone III
	Kiichi Miyazawa 宮澤 喜一; Rep for Hiroshima 3rd (1919–2007)	6 November 1987	9 December 1988	1 year, 34 days	Liberal Democratic	Noboru Takeshita (1987–1989)	Takeshita
Vacant (9 December 1988 – 5 November 1991)						Noboru Takeshita (1987–1989)	Takeshita
Vacant (9 December 1988 – 5 November 1991)						Sōsuke Uno (1989)	Uno
Vacant (9 December 1988 – 5 November 1991)						Toshiki Kaifu (1989–1991)	Kaifu I
Vacant (9 December 1988 – 5 November 1991)						Toshiki Kaifu (1989–1991)	Kaifu II
	Michio Watanabe 渡辺 美智雄; Rep for Tochigi 1st (1923–1995)	5 November 1991	7 April 1993	1 year, 154 days	Liberal Democratic	Kiichi Miyazawa (1991–1993)	Miyazawa
	Masaharu Gotōda 後藤田 正晴; Rep for Tokushima at-large (1914–2005)	8 April 1993	9 August 1993	124 days	Liberal Democratic	Kiichi Miyazawa (1991–1993)	Miyazawa
photograph	Tsutomu Hata 羽田 孜 Rep for Nagano 2nd (1935–2017)	9 August 1993	28 April 1994	263 days	Renewal	Morihiro Hosokawa (1993–1994)	Hosokawa
Vacant (28 April – 30 June 1994)						Tsutomu Hata (1994)	Hata
	Yōhei Kōno 河野 洋平; Rep for Kanagawa 5th (1937–2026)	30 June 1994	2 October 1995	1 year, 95 days	Liberal Democratic	Tomiichi Murayama (1994–1996)	Murayama
	Ryutaro Hashimoto 橋本 龍太郞; Rep for Okayama 2nd (1937–2006)	2 October 1995	11 January 1996	102 days	Liberal Democratic	Tomiichi Murayama (1994–1996)	Murayama
	Wataru Kubo 久保 亘 Councillor for Kagoshima at-large (1929–2003)	11 January 1996	7 November 1996	302 days	Social Democratic	Ryutaro Hashimoto (1996–1998)	Hashimoto I
Vacant (7 November 1996 – 16 September 2009)						Ryutaro Hashimoto (1996–1998)	Hashimoto II
Vacant (7 November 1996 – 16 September 2009)						Keizō Obuchi (1998–2000)	Obuchi
Vacant (7 November 1996 – 16 September 2009)						Yoshirō Mori (2000–2001)	Mori I
Vacant (7 November 1996 – 16 September 2009)						Yoshirō Mori (2000–2001)	Mori II
Vacant (7 November 1996 – 16 September 2009)						Junichiro Koizumi (2001–2006)	Koizumi I
Vacant (7 November 1996 – 16 September 2009)						Junichiro Koizumi (2001–2006)	Koizumi II
Vacant (7 November 1996 – 16 September 2009)						Junichiro Koizumi (2001–2006)	Koizumi III
Vacant (7 November 1996 – 16 September 2009)						Shinzo Abe (2006–2007)	Abe S. I
Vacant (7 November 1996 – 16 September 2009)						Yasuo Fukuda (2007–2008)	Fukuda Y.
Vacant (7 November 1996 – 16 September 2009)						Tarō Asō (2008–2009)	Asō
	Naoto Kan 菅 直人; Rep for Tokyo 18th (born 1946)	16 September 2009	8 June 2010	266 days	Democratic	Yukio Hatoyama (2009–2010)	Hatoyama Y.
Vacant (8 June 2010 – 13 January 2012)						Naoto Kan (2010–2011)	Kan
Vacant (8 June 2010 – 13 January 2012)						Yoshihiko Noda (2011–2012)	Noda
	Katsuya Okada 岡田 克也; Rep for Mie 3rd (born 1953)	13 January 2012	26 December 2012	349 days	Democratic	Yoshihiko Noda (2011–2012)	Noda
	Tarō Asō 麻󠄁生 太郞; Rep for Fukuoka 8th (born 1940)	26 December 2012	4 October 2021	8 years, 283 days	Liberal Democratic	Shinzo Abe (2012–2020)	Abe S. II
	Tarō Asō 麻󠄁生 太郞; Rep for Fukuoka 8th (born 1940)	26 December 2012	4 October 2021	8 years, 283 days	Liberal Democratic	Shinzo Abe (2012–2020)	Abe S. III
	Tarō Asō 麻󠄁生 太郞; Rep for Fukuoka 8th (born 1940)	26 December 2012	4 October 2021	8 years, 283 days	Liberal Democratic	Shinzo Abe (2012–2020)	Abe S. IV
	Tarō Asō 麻󠄁生 太郞; Rep for Fukuoka 8th (born 1940)	26 December 2012	4 October 2021	8 years, 283 days	Liberal Democratic	Yoshihide Suga (2020–2021)	Suga
Vacant (since 4 October 2021)						Fumio Kishida (2021–2024)	Kishida I
Vacant (since 4 October 2021)						Fumio Kishida (2021–2024)	Kishida II
Vacant (since 4 October 2021)						Shigeru Ishiba (2024–2025)	Ishiba I
Vacant (since 4 October 2021)						Shigeru Ishiba (2024–2025)	Ishiba II
Vacant (since 4 October 2021)						Sanae Takaichi (since 2025)	Takaichi I
Vacant (since 4 October 2021)						Sanae Takaichi (since 2025)	Takaichi II
