= Miyazawa cabinet =

Cabinet of Japan (1991–1993)

Miyazawa Cabinet
- 78th Cabinet of Japan

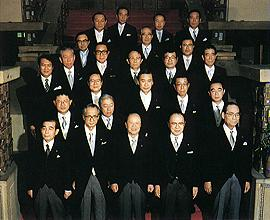
- Date formed: November 5, 1991
- Date dissolved: December 12, 1992

People and organisations
- Emperor: Akihito
- Prime Minister: Kiichi Miyazawa
- Member party: Liberal Democratic Party
- Status in legislature: Majority government (Lower House)
- Opposition parties: Japan Socialist Party; Kōmeitō; Democratic Socialist Party; Japanese Communist Party

History
- Election: 16th Councillors election (1992)
- Predecessor: Second Kaifu Cabinet (Reshuffle)
- Successor: Miyazawa Cabinet (Reshuffle)

The Miyazawa Cabinet is the 78th Cabinet of Japan headed by Kiichi Miyazawa from November 5, 1991 to August 9, 1993.

== Cabinet ==
Portfolio	Minister	Special mission etc.	Note
Prime Minister	Kiichi Miyazawa		
Deputy Prime Minister; Minister for Foreign Affairs	Michio Watanabe		
Minister of Justice	Takashi Tawara		
Minister of Finance	Tsutomu Hata		
Minister of Education	Kunio Hatoyama		
Minister of Health	Tokuo Yamashita		
Minister of Agriculture, Forestry and Fisheries	Masami Tanabu		
Minister of International Trade and Industry	Kōzō Watanabe		
Minister of Transport	Keiwa Okuda		
Minister of Posts	Hideo Watanabe		
Minister of Labor	Tetsuo Kondo		
Minister of Construction	Taku Yamasaki		
Minister of Home Affairs; Chair of the National Public Safety Commission	Masajuro Shiokawa		
Chief Cabinet Secretary	Koichi Kato		
Director of the Management and Coordination Agency	Junzō Iwasaki		
Director of the Hokkaido Regional Development Agency; Director of the Okinawa Regional Development Agency	Tomoo Ie		
Director of the Defense Agency	Sohei Miyashita		
Director of the Economic Planning Agency	Takeshi Noda		
Director of the Science and Technology Agency	Kanzō Tanigawa	Chair of the Atomic Energy Commission	
Director of the Environment Agency	Shozaburo Nakamura	for Global Environmental issues	
Director of the National Land Agency	Yoshiyuki Tōya	In charge of Research and College Town	
Director-General of the Cabinet Legislation Bureau	Atsuo Kudō		
Deputy Chief Cabinet Secretary (for Political Affairs)	Motoji Kondō		
Deputy Chief Cabinet Secretary (for General Affairs)	Nobuo Ishihara		

== Reshuffled Cabinet ==
Miyazawa Cabinet (Reshuffle)
- 78th Cabinet of Japan

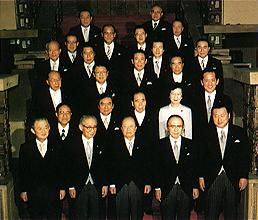
- Date formed: December 12, 1992
- Date dissolved: August 9, 1993

People and organisations
- Emperor: Akihito
- Prime Minister: Kiichi Miyazawa
- Member party: Liberal Democratic Party
- Status in legislature: Majority government (Lower House)
- Opposition parties: Japan Socialist Party; Kōmeitō; Democratic Socialist Party; Japanese Communist Party

History
- Outgoing election: 40th general election (1993)
- Predecessor: Miyazawa Cabinet
- Successor: Hosokawa Cabinet

The Cabinet reshuffle took place on December 12, 1992.

Portfolio	Minister	Special mission etc.	Note
Prime Minister	Kiichi Miyazawa		
Deputy Prime Minister; Minister for Foreign Affairs	Michio Watanabe	Concurrently serving as Minister for Foreign Affairs	Resigned on April 7, 1993
Deputy Prime Minister; Minister for Foreign Affairs	Masaharu Gotōda	Concurrently serving as Minister of Justice	Appointed on April 8, 1993
Minister of Justice	Masaharu Gotōda		
Minister for Foreign Affairs	Michio Watanabe		Resigned on April 7, 1993
Minister for Foreign Affairs	Kabun Mutō		Appointed on April 8, 1993
Minister of Finance	Yoshiro Hayashi		
Minister of Education	Mayumi Moriyama		
Minister of Health	Yuya Niwa		
Minister of Agriculture, Forestry and Fisheries	Masami Tanabu		Resigned on August 4, 1993
Minister of Agriculture, Forestry and Fisheries	Kiichi Miyazawa	Concurrently serving as Prime Minister and Minister of Posts	Appointed on August 4, 1993
Minister of International Trade and Industry	Yoshirō Mori		
Minister of Transport	Ihei Ochi		
Minister of Posts	Junichiro Koizumi		Resigned on July 20, 1993
Minister of Posts	Kiichi Miyazawa	Concurrently serving as Prime Minister	Appointed on July 20, 1993
Minister of Labor	Masakuni Murakami		
Minister of Construction	Kishirō Nakamura		
Minister of Home Affairs; Chair of the National Public Safety Commission	Keijirō Murata		
Chief Cabinet Secretary	Yōhei Kōno	for Women's issues	
Director of the Management and Coordination Agency	Michihiko Kano		
Director of the Hokkaido Regional Development Agency; Director of the Okinawa Regional Development Agency	Shūji Kita		
Director of the Defense Agency	Toshio Nakayama		
Director of the Economic Planning Agency	Hajime Funada		Resigned on June 18, 1993
Director of the Economic Planning Agency	Kiichi Miyazawa	Administrative Handling (Concurrently serving as Prime Minister)	Appointed on June 18, 1993; Resigned on June 21, 1993
Director of the Economic Planning Agency	Osamu Takatori		Appointed on June 21, 1993
Director of the Science and Technology Agency	Mamoru Nakajima	Chair of the Atomic Energy Commission	Resigned on June 18, 1993
Director of the Science and Technology Agency	Kiichi Miyazawa	Administrative Handling (Concurrently serving as Prime Minister)	Appointed on June 18, 1993; Resigned on June 21, 1993
Director of the Science and Technology Agency	Shōichi Watanabe	Chair of the Atomic Energy Commission	Appointed on June 21, 1993
Director of the Environment Agency	Taikan Hayashi	for Global Environmental issues	
Director of the National Land Agency	Takashi Inoue	In charge of Research and College Town	
Deputy Chief Cabinet Secretary	Motoji Kondō		for Political Affairs
Deputy Chief Cabinet Secretary	Nobuo Ishihara		for General Affairs
Director-General of the Cabinet Legislation Bureau	Takao Ōde		
