= Miki cabinet =

Cabinet of Japan (1974–1976)

Miki Cabinet
- 66th Cabinet of Japan
- 1974–1976
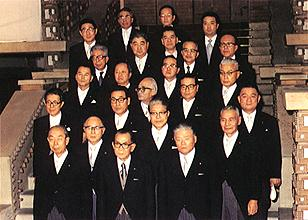
- Date formed: December 9, 1974
- Date dissolved: September 15, 1976

People and organisations
- Emperor: Shōwa
- Prime Minister: Takeo Miki
- Deputy Prime Minister: Takeo Fukuda
- Member party: Liberal Democratic Party
- Status in legislature: Majority government (Lower House)
- Opposition parties: Japan Socialist Party; Kōmeitō; Democratic Socialist Party; Japanese Communist Party

History
- Predecessor: Second Kakuei Tanaka Cabinet (Second Reshuffle)
- Successor: Miki Cabinet (Reshuffle)

The Miki Cabinet is the 66th Cabinet of Japan headed by Takeo Miki from December 9, 1974, to December 24, 1976.

== Cabinet ==
Portfolio	Minister	Term start	Term end
Prime Minister	Takeo Miki	December 9, 1974	September 15, 1976
Deputy Prime Minister; Director of the Economic Planning Agency	Takeo Fukuda	December 9, 1974	September 15, 1976
Minister of Justice	Osamu Inaba	December 9, 1974	September 15, 1976
Minister for Foreign Affairs	Kiichi Miyazawa	December 9, 1974	September 15, 1976
Minister of Finance	Masayoshi Ōhira	December 9, 1974	September 15, 1976
Minister of Education	Michio Nagai (Non-legislator)	December 9, 1974	September 15, 1976
Minister of Health	Masami Tanaka	December 9, 1974	September 15, 1976
Minister of Agriculture, Forestry and Fisheries	Shintaro Abe	December 9, 1974	September 15, 1976
Minister of International Trade and Industry	Toshio Kōmoto	December 9, 1974	September 15, 1976
Minister of Transport	Mutsuo Kimura	December 9, 1974	September 15, 1976
Minister of Posts	Isamu Murakami	December 9, 1974	September 15, 1976
Minister of Labor	Takashi Hasegawa	December 9, 1974	September 15, 1976
Minister of Construction	Tadao Kariya	December 9, 1974	January 15, 1976
Minister of Construction	Takeo Miki (Acting)	January 15, 1976	January 19, 1976
Minister of Construction	Noboru Takeshita	January 19, 1976	September 15, 1976
Minister of Home Affairs; Chair of the National Public Safety Commission; Director of the Hokkaido Regional Development Agency	Hajime Fukuda	December 9, 1974	September 15, 1976
Chief Cabinet Secretary	Ichitarō Ide	December 9, 1974	September 15, 1976
Director-General of the Prime Minister's Office; Director of the Okinawa Development Agency Development	Mitsunori Ueki	December 9, 1974	September 15, 1976
Director of the Administrative Management Agency	Yūzō Matsuzawa	December 9, 1974	September 15, 1976
Director of the National Land Agency	Shin Kanemaru	December 9, 1974	September 15, 1976
Director of the Defense Agency	Michita Sakata	December 9, 1974	September 15, 1976
Director of the Science and Technology Agency	Yoshitake Sasaki	December 9, 1974	September 15, 1976
Director of the Environment Agency	Tatsuo Ozawa	December 9, 1974	September 15, 1976
Deputy Chief Cabinet Secretary (Political Affairs)	Toshiki Kaifu	December 9, 1974	September 15, 1976
Deputy Chief Cabinet Secretary (General Affairs)	Hiromori Kawashima (Bureaucrat)	December 9, 1974	May 25, 1976
Deputy Chief Cabinet Secretary (General Affairs)	Yoshimasa Umemoto (Bureaucrat)	May 25, 1976	September 15, 1976
Director-General of the Cabinet Legislation Bureau	Ichiro Yoshikuni (Bureaucrat)	December 9, 1974	May 25, 1976
Director-General of the Cabinet Legislation Bureau	Hideo Sanada (Bureaucrat)	May 25, 1976	September 15, 1976
Deputy Chief Cabinet Secretary for the Prime Minister's Office (Political Affairs)	Jūrō Matsumoto	December 12, 1974	December 26, 1975
Deputy Chief Cabinet Secretary for the Prime Minister's Office (Political Affairs)	Yoshirō Mori	December 26, 1975	September 15, 1976
Deputy Chief Cabinet Secretary for the Prime Minister's Office (General Affairs)	Michio Minakawa (Bureaucrat)	December 9, 1974	September 15, 1976

== Reshuffled Cabinet ==
Miki Cabinet (Reshuffle)
- 66th Cabinet of Japan

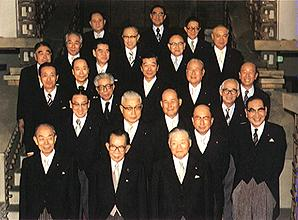
- Date formed: September 15, 1976
- Date dissolved: December 24, 1976

People and organisations
- Emperor: Shōwa
- Prime Minister: Takeo Miki
- Deputy Prime Minister: Takeo Fukuda
- Member party: Liberal Democratic Party
- Status in legislature: Majority government (Lower House)
- Opposition parties: Japan Socialist Party; Kōmeitō; Democratic Socialist Party; Japanese Communist Party

History
- Election: 34th general election (1976)
- Predecessor: Miki Cabinet
- Successor: Takeo Fukuda Cabinet

The Cabinet reshuffle took place on September 15, 1976.

Portfolio	Minister	Term start	Term end
Prime Minister	Takeo Miki	September 15, 1976	December 24, 1976
Deputy Prime Minister	Takeo Fukuda	September 15, 1976	December 24, 1976
Minister of Justice	Osamu Inaba	September 15, 1976	December 24, 1976
Minister for Foreign Affairs	Zentarō Kosaka	September 15, 1976	December 24, 1976
Minister of Finance	Masayoshi Ōhira	September 15, 1976	December 24, 1976
Minister of Education	Michio Nagai (Non-legislator)	September 15, 1976	December 24, 1976
Minister of Health	Takashi Hayakawa	September 15, 1976	December 24, 1976
Minister of Agriculture, Forestry and Fisheries	Buichi Ōishi	September 15, 1976	December 24, 1976
Minister of International Trade and Industry	Toshio Kōmoto	September 15, 1976	December 24, 1976
Minister of Transport	Hirohide Ishida	September 15, 1976	December 24, 1976
Minister of Posts	Tokuyasu Fukuda	September 15, 1976	December 24, 1976
Minister of Labor	Sachio Urano	September 15, 1976	December 24, 1976
Minister of Construction	Tatsui Chūman	September 15, 1976	December 24, 1976
Minister of Home Affairs; Chair of the National Public Safety Commission; Director of the Hokkaido Regional Development Agency	Kimiyoshi Amano	September 15, 1976	December 24, 1976
Chief Cabinet Secretary	Ichitarō Ide	September 15, 1976	December 24, 1976
Director-General of the Prime Minister's Office; Director of the Okinawa Development Agency Development	Shōji Nishimura	September 15, 1976	December 24, 1976
Director of the Administrative Management Agency	Seijuro Arafune	September 15, 1976	December 24, 1976
Director of the National Land Agency	Kōsei Amano	September 15, 1976	December 24, 1976
Director of the Defense Agency	Michita Sakata	September 15, 1976	December 24, 1976
Director of the Economic Planning Agency	Takeo Fukuda	September 15, 1976	November 6, 1976
Director of the Economic Planning Agency	Uichi Noda	November 6, 1976	December 24, 1976
Director of the Science and Technology Agency	Masao Maeda	September 15, 1976	December 24, 1976
Director of the Environment Agency	Shigesada Marumo	September 15, 1976	December 24, 1976
Deputy Chief Cabinet Secretary (Political Affairs)	Hyōsuke Kujiraoka	September 15, 1976	December 24, 1976
Deputy Chief Cabinet Secretary (General Affairs)	Yoshimasa Umemoto (Bureaucrat)	September 15, 1976	December 24, 1976
Director-General of the Cabinet Legislation Bureau	Hideo Sanada (Bureaucrat)	September 15, 1976	December 24, 1976
Deputy Chief Cabinet Secretary for the Prime Minister's Office (Political Affairs)	Yoshirō Mori	September 15, 1976	September 20, 1976
Deputy Chief Cabinet Secretary for the Prime Minister's Office (Political Affairs)	Takashi Hashiguchi	September 20, 1976	December 24, 1976
Deputy Chief Cabinet Secretary for the Prime Minister's Office (General Affairs)	Michio Minakawa (Bureaucrat)	September 15, 1976	October 1, 1976
Deputy Chief Cabinet Secretary for the Prime Minister's Office (General Affairs)	Susumu Akiyama (Bureaucrat)	October 1, 1976	December 24, 1976
