= Takeshita cabinet =

Cabinet of Japan (1987–1989)

Takeshita Cabinet
- 74th Cabinet of Japan
- 1987–1988
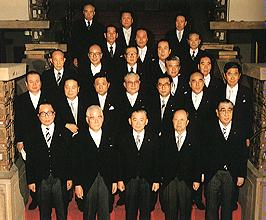
- Date formed: November 6, 1987
- Date dissolved: December 27, 1988

People and organisations
- Emperor: Shōwa
- Prime Minister: Noboru Takeshita
- Member party: Liberal Democratic Party
- Status in legislature: Majority government (Lower House)
- Opposition parties: Japan Socialist Party; Kōmeitō; Democratic Socialist Party; Japanese Communist Party

History
- Predecessor: Third Nakasone Cabinet
- Successor: Takeshita Cabinet (Reshuffle)

The Takeshita Cabinet is the 74th Cabinet of Japan headed by Noboru Takeshita from November 6, 1987, to June 3, 1989.

== Cabinet ==
Portfolio	Minister	Special mission etc.	Note
Prime Minister	Noboru Takeshita		
Deputy Prime Minister	Kiichi Miyazawa		Resigned on December 9, 1988 (Note: Due to the Recruit scandal)
Minister of Justice	Yukio Hayashida		
Minister for Foreign Affairs	Sōsuke Uno		
Minister of Finance	Kiichi Miyazawa		Resigned on December 9, 1988
Minister of Finance	Noboru Takeshita	Concurrently serving as Prime Minister	Appointed on December 9, 1988; Resigned on December 24, 1988
Minister of Finance	Tatsuo Murayama		Appointed on December 24, 1988
Minister of Education	Gentarō Nakajima	National Diet Library Liaison and Coordination Committee member	
Minister of Health	Takao Fujimoto	In charge of Pension issues	
Minister of Agriculture, Forestry and Fisheries	Takashi Satō		
Minister of International Trade and Industry	Hajime Tamura		
Minister of Transport	Shintaro Ishihara	In charge of New Tokyo International Airport issues	
Minister of Posts	Masaaki Nakayama		
Minister of Labor	Tarō Nakamura		
Minister of Construction	Ihei Ochi	for the International Garden and Greenery Exposition	
Minister of Home Affairs; Chair of the National Public Safety Commission	Seiroku Kajiyama		
Chief Cabinet Secretary	Keizō Obuchi		
Director of the Management and Coordination Agency	Osamu Takatori		
Director of the Hokkaido Regional Development Agency; Director of the Okinawa Regional Development Agency	Shigeru Kasuya		
Director of the Defense Agency	Tsutomu Kawara		Resigned on August 24, 1988 (Note: Due to the JDS Nadashio maritime incident)
Director of the Defense Agency	Kichirō Tazawa		Appointed on August 24, 1988
Director of the Economic Planning Agency	Eiichi Nakao		
Director of the Science and Technology Agency	Soichiro Ito	Chair of the Atomic Energy Commission	
Director of the Environment Agency	Toshio Horiuchi		
Director of the National Land Agency	Seisuke Okuno	In charge of Land Measures	Resigned on May 13, 1988
Director of the National Land Agency	Hideo Utsumi	In charge of Land Measures	Appointed on May 13, 1988
Deputy Chief Cabinet Secretary	Ichirō Ozawa		for Political Affairs
Deputy Chief Cabinet Secretary	Nobuo Ishihara		for General Affairs; Previous office: Administrative Vice-Minister of Home Affairs
Director-General of the Cabinet Legislation Bureau	Osamu Mimura		Previous office: Chief of the Tokyo High Public Prosecutors Office

== Reshuffled Cabinet ==
Takeshita Cabinet
- 74th Cabinet of Japan
- 1988–1989
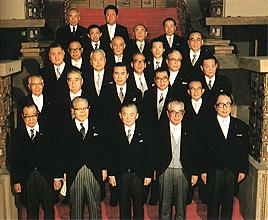
- Date formed: December 27, 1988
- Date dissolved: June 3, 1989

People and organisations
- Emperor: Shōwa (1988–Jan 1989); Akihito (Jan–Jun 1989)
- Prime Minister: Noboru Takeshita
- Member party: Liberal Democratic Party
- Status in legislature: Majority government (Lower House)
- Opposition parties: Japan Socialist Party; Kōmeitō; Democratic Socialist Party; Japanese Communist Party

History
- Predecessor: Takeshita Cabinet
- Successor: Uno Cabinet

The Cabinet reshuffle took place on December 27, 1988.

Portfolio	Minister	Special mission etc.	Note
Prime Minister	Noboru Takeshita		
Minister of Justice	Takashi Hasegawa		Resigned on December 30, 1988 (Note: Resigned after it was discovered that he had received political donations from Recruit (company).)
Minister of Justice	Masami Takatsuji		Appointed on December 30, 1988; Non-legislator; Previous office: National Public Safety Commission member
Minister for Foreign Affairs	Sōsuke Uno		
Minister of Finance	Tatsuo Murayama		
Minister of Education	Takeo Nishioka	National Diet Library Liaison and Coordination Committee member	
Minister of Health	Junichiro Koizumi	In charge of Pension issues	
Minister of Agriculture, Forestry and Fisheries	Tsutomu Hata		
Minister of International Trade and Industry	Hiroshi Mitsuzuka		
Minister of Transport	Shinji Sato	In charge of New Tokyo International Airport issues	
Minister of Posts	Seiichi Kataoka		
Minister of Labor	Hyōsuke Niwa		
Minister of Construction	Hikosaburo Okonogi		Resigned on June 2, 1989 (Note: Resigned to become chairman of the House of Representatives Steering Committee.)
Minister of Construction	Noboru Takeshita	Acting; Concurrently serving as Prime Minister	Appointed on June 2, 1989
Minister of Home Affairs; Chair of the National Public Safety Commission	Shigenobu Sakano		
Chief Cabinet Secretary	Keizō Obuchi		
Director of the Management and Coordination Agency	Saburō Kanemaru		
Director of the Hokkaido Regional Development Agency; Director of the Okinawa Regional Development Agency	Chikao Sakamoto		
Director of the Defense Agency	Kichirō Tazawa		
Director of the Economic Planning Agency	Ken Harada		Resigned on January 25, 1989
Director of the Economic Planning Agency	Kōichirō Aino		Appointed on January 25, 1989
Director of the Science and Technology Agency	Moichi Miyazaki	Chair of the Atomic Energy Commission	
Director of the Environment Agency	Masahisa Aoki		
Director of the National Land Agency	Hideo Utsumi	In charge of Land Measures for the International Garden and Greenery Exposition	
Deputy Chief Cabinet Secretary	Ichirō Ozawa		for Political Affairs
Deputy Chief Cabinet Secretary	Nobuo Ishihara		for General Affairs; Previous office: Administrative Vice-Minister of Home Affairs
Director-General of the Cabinet Legislation Bureau	Osamu Mimura		Previous office: Chief of the Tokyo High Public Prosecutors Office
