= Kishi Cabinet =

Kishi Cabinet may refer to:

- First Kishi Cabinet, the Japanese majority government led by Nobusuke Kishi from 1957 to 1958
- Second Kishi Cabinet, the Japanese majority government led by Nobusuke Kishi from 1958 to 1960
