= Kaifu Cabinet =

Kaifu Cabinet may refer to:

- First Kaifu Cabinet, the Japanese majority government led by Toshiki Kaifu from 1989 to 1990
- Second Kaifu Cabinet, the Japanese majority government led by Toshiki Kaifu from 1990 to 1991
