= Nakasone Cabinet =

Nakasone Cabinet may refer to:

- First Nakasone Cabinet, the Japanese majority government led by Yasuhiro Nakasone from 1982 to 1983
- Second Nakasone Cabinet, the Japanese majority government led by Yasuhiro Nakasone from 1983 to 1986
- Third Nakasone Cabinet, the Japanese majority government led by Yasuhiro Nakasone from 1986 to 1987
