= First Kishi cabinet =

Cabinet of Japan (1957–1958)

First Kishi Cabinet
- 56th Cabinet of Japan

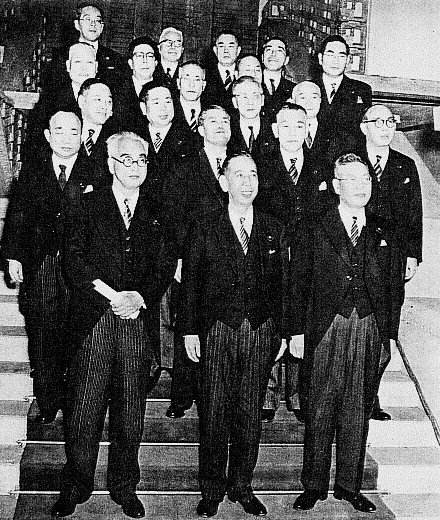
- Date formed: February 25, 1957
- Date dissolved: July 10, 1957

People and organisations
- Emperor: Shōwa
- Prime Minister: Nobusuke Kishi
- Deputy Prime Minister: Mitsujirō Ishii (from May 20, 1957)
- Member party: Liberal Democratic Party
- Status in legislature: House of Representatives: Majority; House of Councillors: Minority
- Opposition parties: Japan Socialist Party; Japanese Communist Party; Ryokufūkai

History
- Legislature term: 26th National Diet
- Predecessor: Ishibashi Cabinet
- Successor: First Kishi Cabinet (Reshuffle)

The First Kishi Cabinet is the 56th Cabinet of Japan headed by Nobusuke Kishi from February 25, 1957 to June 12, 1958.

== Cabinet ==
Portfolio	Name	Political party	Term start	Term end
Prime Minister	Nobusuke Kishi	Liberal Democratic	February 25, 1957	June 12, 1958
Deputy Prime Minister; Minister of State	Mitsujirō Ishii	Liberal Democratic	May 20, 1957	June 12, 1958
Minister of Justice	Umekichi Nakamura	Liberal Democratic	February 25, 1957	July 10, 1957
Minister for Foreign Affairs	Nobusuke Kishi	Liberal Democratic	February 25, 1957	July 10, 1957
Minister of Finance	Hayato Ikeda	Liberal Democratic	February 25, 1957	July 10, 1957
Minister of Education	Hirokichi Nadao	Liberal Democratic	February 25, 1957	July 10, 1957
Minister of Health	Hiroshi Kanda	Liberal Democratic	February 25, 1957	July 10, 1957
Minister of Agriculture, Forestry and Fisheries	Ichitarō Ide	Liberal Democratic	February 25, 1957	July 10, 1957
Minister of International Trade and Industry	Mikio Mizuta	Liberal Democratic	February 25, 1957	July 10, 1957
Minister of Transport	Taneo Miyazawa	Liberal Democratic	February 25, 1957	July 10, 1957
Minister of Posts	Tarō Hirai	Liberal Democratic	February 25, 1957	July 10, 1957
Minister of Labor	Shūtarō Matsuura	Liberal Democratic	February 25, 1957	July 10, 1957
Minister of Construction; Chairman of the National Capital Region Development Commission	Tokuo Nanjō	Liberal Democratic	February 25, 1957	July 10, 1957
Director of the Administrative Management Agency; Chairman of the National Public Safety Commission	Tomejiro Okubo	Liberal Democratic	February 25, 1957	July 10, 1957
Director of the Hokkaido Regional Development Agency	Matsusuke Kamamura	Liberal Democratic	February 25, 1957	April 30, 1957
Director of the Hokkaido Regional Development Agency	Morinosuke Kajima	Liberal Democratic	April 30, 1957	July 10, 1957
Director of the Home Affairs Agency	Isaji Tanaka	Liberal Democratic	February 25, 1957	July 10, 1957
Director of the Defense Agency	Akira Kodaki	Liberal Democratic	February 25, 1957	July 10, 1957
Director of the Economic Planning Agency; Director of the Science and Technology Agency	Koichi Uda	Liberal Democratic	February 25, 1957	July 10, 1957
Chief Cabinet Secretary	Hirohide Ishida	Liberal Democratic	February 25, 1957	July 10, 1957
Director-General of the Cabinet Legislation Bureau	Shūzō Hayashi	Independent	February 25, 1957	June 12, 1958
Deputy Chief Cabinet Secretary (Political Affairs)	Naokichi Kitazawa	Liberal Democratic	February 25, 1957	July 12, 1957
Deputy Chief Cabinet Secretary (General Affairs)	Eiichi Tanaka	Independent	February 25, 1957	July 12, 1957

== Reshuffled Cabinet ==
First Kishi Cabinet (Reshuffle)
- 56th Cabinet of Japan

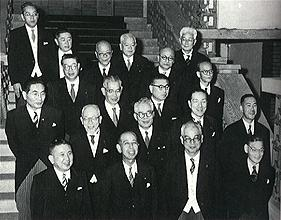
- Date formed: July 10, 1957
- Date dissolved: June 12, 1958

People and organisations
- Emperor: Shōwa
- Prime Minister: Nobusuke Kishi
- Deputy Prime Minister: Mitsujirō Ishii
- Member party: Liberal Democratic Party
- Status in legislature: House of Representatives: Majority; House of Councillors: Minority
- Opposition parties: Japan Socialist Party; Japanese Communist Party; Ryokufūkai

History
- Legislature term: 27th-29th National Diet
- Predecessor: First Kishi Cabinet
- Successor: Second Kishi Cabinet

A Cabinet reshuffle took place on July 10, 1957.

Portfolio	Name	Political party	Term start	Term end
Prime Minister	Nobusuke Kishi	Liberal Democratic	February 25, 1957	June 12, 1958
Deputy Prime Minister; Minister of State	Mitsujirō Ishii	Liberal Democratic	May 20, 1957	June 12, 1958
Minister of Justice	Toshiki Karasawa	Liberal Democratic	July 10, 1957	June 12, 1958
Minister for Foreign Affairs	Aiichirō Fujiyama	Liberal Democratic	July 10, 1957	June 12, 1958
Minister of Finance	Hisato Ichimada	Liberal Democratic	July 10, 1957	June 12, 1958
Minister of Education	Tō Matsunaga	Liberal Democratic	July 10, 1957	June 12, 1958
Minister of Health	Kenzō Horiki	Liberal Democratic	July 10, 1957	June 12, 1958
Minister of Agriculture, Forestry and Fisheries	Munenori Akagi	Liberal Democratic	July 10, 1957	June 12, 1958
Minister of International Trade and Industry	Shigesaburō Maeo	Liberal Democratic	July 10, 1957	June 12, 1958
Minister of Transport	Sannojo Nakamura	Liberal Democratic	July 10, 1957	June 12, 1958
Minister of Posts	Kakuei Tanaka	Liberal Democratic	July 10, 1957	June 12, 1958
Minister of Labor	Hirohide Ishida	Liberal Democratic	July 10, 1957	June 12, 1958
Minister of Construction; Chairman of the National Capital Region Development Commission	Ryutarō Nemoto	Liberal Democratic	July 10, 1957	June 12, 1958
Chairman of the National Public Safety Commission; Director of the Science and Technology Agency	Matsutarō Shōriki	Liberal Democratic	July 10, 1957	June 12, 1958
Director of the Administrative Management Agency; Director of the Hokkaido Regional Development Agency	Mitsujirō Ishii	Liberal Democratic	July 10, 1957	June 12, 1958
Director of the Home Affairs Agency	Yuichi Kōri	Liberal Democratic	July 10, 1957	June 12, 1958
Director of the Defense Agency	Juichi Tsushima	Liberal Democratic	July 10, 1957	June 12, 1958
Director of the Economic Planning Agency	Ichirō Kōno	Liberal Democratic	July 10, 1957	June 12, 1958
Chief Cabinet Secretary	Kiichi Aichi	Liberal Democratic	July 10, 1957	June 12, 1958
Director-General of the Prime Minister's Office	Jirō Imamatsu	Liberal Democratic	August 1, 1957	June 12, 1958
Director-General of the Cabinet Legislation Bureau	Shūzō Hayashi	Independent	February 25, 1957	June 12, 1958
Deputy Chief Cabinet Secretary (Political Affairs)	Tatsuo Tanaka	Liberal Democratic	July 12, 1957	June 12, 1958
Deputy Chief Cabinet Secretary (General Affairs)	Eijo Okazaki	Liberal Democratic	July 12, 1957	June 12, 1958
Deputy Director General of the Prime Minister's Office)	Setsuo Fujiwara	Liberal Democratic	August 1, 1957	June 12, 1958
Deputy Director General of the Prime Minister's Office)	Kentarō Uemura	Independent	April 22, 1958	June 12, 1958
