= Uno cabinet =

Cabinet of Japan (1989)

Uno Cabinet
- 75th Cabinet of Japan

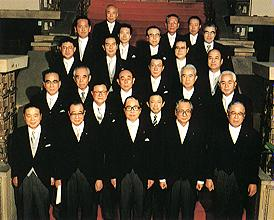
- Date formed: June 3, 1989
- Date dissolved: August 10, 1989

People and organisations
- Emperor: Akihito
- Prime Minister: Sōsuke Uno
- Member party: Liberal Democratic Party
- Status in legislature: Majority government (Lower House)
- Opposition parties: Japan Socialist Party; Kōmeitō; Democratic Socialist Party; Japanese Communist Party

History
- Election: 15th Councillors election (1989)
- Predecessor: Takeshita Cabinet (Reshuffle)
- Successor: First Kaifu Cabinet

The Uno Cabinet is the 75th Cabinet of Japan headed by Sōsuke Uno from June 3 to August 10, 1989.

== Cabinet ==
Portfolio	Minister	Special mission etc.	Note
Prime Minister	Sōsuke Uno		
Minister of Justice	Kazuo Tanikawa		
Minister for Foreign Affairs	Hiroshi Mitsuzuka		
Minister of Finance	Tatsuo Murayama		
Minister of Education	Takeo Nishioka		
Minister of Health	Junichiro Koizumi		
Minister of Agriculture, Forestry and Fisheries	Hisao Horinouchi		
Minister of International Trade and Industry	Seiroku Kajiyama		
Minister of Transport	Shinjirō Yamamura	In charge of New Tokyo International Airport issues	
Minister of Posts	Kanezō Muraoka		
Minister of Labor	Mitsuo Horiuchi		
Minister of Construction	Takeshi Noda	In charge of Land Measures	
Minister of Home Affairs; Chair of the National Public Safety Commission	Shigenobu Sakano		
Chief Cabinet Secretary	Masajuro Shiokawa		
Director of the Management and Coordination Agency	Yukihiko Ikeda		
Director of the Hokkaido Regional Development Agency; Director of the Okinawa Regional Development Agency	Kichio Inoue		
Director of the Defense Agency	Taku Yamasaki		
Director of the Economic Planning Agency	Michio Ochi		
Director of the Science and Technology Agency	Kishirō Nakamura	Chair of the Atomic Energy Commission	
Director of the Environment Agency	Tatsuo Yamazaki	for Global Environmental issues	
Director of the National Land Agency	Eiji Nonaka	for the International Garden and Greenery Exposition for Research and College Town	
Deputy Chief Cabinet Secretary	Takamori Makino		for Political Affairs
Deputy Chief Cabinet Secretary	Nobuo Ishihara		for General Affairs; Previous office: Administrative Vice-Minister of Home Affairs
Director-General of the Cabinet Legislation Bureau	Osamu Mimura		Previous office: Chief of the Tokyo High Public Prosecutors Office
