= Ishibashi cabinet =

Cabinet of Japan (1956–1957)

Ishibashi Cabinet
- 55th Cabinet of Japan

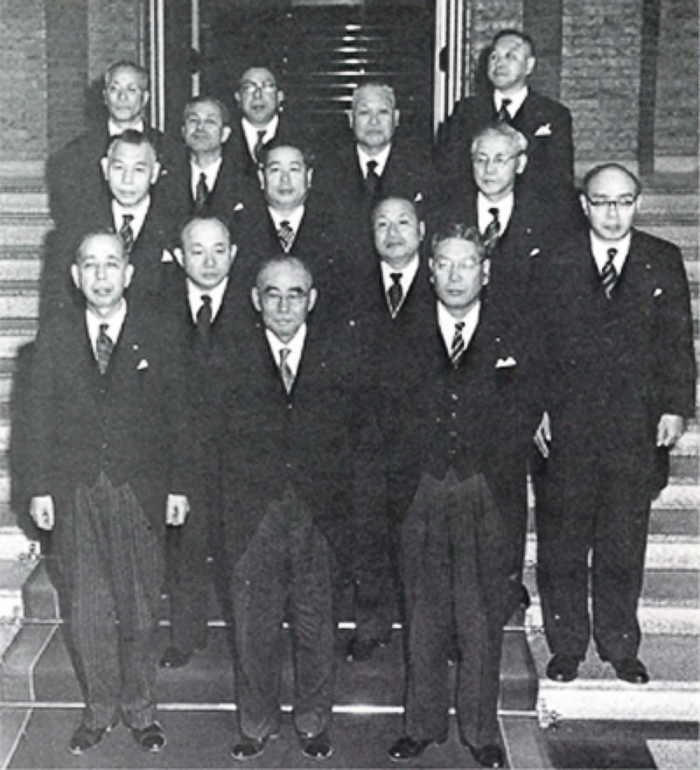
- Date formed: December 23, 1956
- Date dissolved: February 25, 1957

People and organisations
- Emperor: Shōwa
- Prime Minister: Tanzan Ishibashi
- Member party: Liberal Democratic Party
- Status in legislature: House of Representatives: Majority; House of Councillors: Minority
- Opposition parties: Japan Socialist Party; Japanese Communist Party; Labourers and Farmers Party; Ryokufūkai

History
- Legislature term: 26th National Diet
- Predecessor: Third Ichirō Hatoyama Cabinet
- Successor: First Kishi Cabinet

The Ishibashi Cabinet is the 55th Cabinet of Japan headed by Tanzan Ishibashi from December 23, 1956 to February 25, 1957.

== Cabinet ==
Portfolio	Name	Political party	Term start	Term end
Prime Minister	Tanzan Ishibashi	Liberal Democratic	December 23, 1956	February 25, 1957
Prime Minister	Nobusuke Kishi (acting)	Liberal Democratic	January 31, 1957	February 25, 1957
Minister of Justice	Tanzan Ishibashi (acting)	Liberal Democratic	December 23, 1956	December 23, 1956
Minister of Justice	Umekichi Nakamura	Liberal Democratic	December 23, 1956	February 25, 1957
Minister for Foreign Affairs	Tanzan Ishibashi (acting)	Liberal Democratic	December 23, 1956	December 23, 1956
Minister for Foreign Affairs	Nobusuke Kishi	Liberal Democratic	December 23, 1956	February 25, 1957
Minister of Finance	Tanzan Ishibashi (acting)	Liberal Democratic	December 23, 1956	December 23, 1956
Minister of Finance	Hayato Ikeda	Liberal Democratic	December 23, 1956	February 25, 1957
Minister of Education	Tanzan Ishibashi (acting)	Liberal Democratic	December 23, 1956	December 23, 1956
Minister of Education	Hirokichi Nadao	Liberal Democratic	December 23, 1956	February 25, 1957
Minister of Health	Tanzan Ishibashi (acting)	Liberal Democratic	December 23, 1956	December 23, 1956
Minister of Health	Hiroshi Kanda	Liberal Democratic	December 23, 1956	February 25, 1957
Minister of Agriculture, Forestry and Fisheries	Tanzan Ishibashi (acting)	Liberal Democratic	December 23, 1956	December 23, 1956
Minister of Agriculture, Forestry and Fisheries	Ichitarō Ide	Liberal Democratic	December 23, 1956	February 25, 1957
Minister of International Trade and Industry	Tanzan Ishibashi (acting)	Liberal Democratic	December 23, 1956	December 23, 1956
Minister of International Trade and Industry	Mikio Mizuta	Liberal Democratic	December 23, 1956	February 25, 1957
Minister of Transport	Tanzan Ishibashi (acting)	Liberal Democratic	December 23, 1956	December 23, 1956
Minister of Transport	Taneo Miyazawa	Liberal Democratic	December 23, 1956	February 25, 1957
Minister of Posts	Tanzan Ishibashi (acting)	Liberal Democratic	December 23, 1956	December 23, 1956
Minister of Posts	Tanzan Ishibashi	Liberal Democratic	December 23, 1956	December 27, 1956
Minister of Posts	Tarō Hirai	Liberal Democratic	December 27, 1956	February 25, 1957
Minister of Labor	Tanzan Ishibashi (acting)	Liberal Democratic	December 23, 1956	December 23, 1956
Minister of Labor	Shūtarō Matsuura	Liberal Democratic	December 23, 1956	February 25, 1957
Minister of Construction Chair of the National Capital Region Development Commission	Tanzan Ishibashi (acting)	Liberal Democratic	December 23, 1956	December 23, 1956
Minister of Construction Chair of the National Capital Region Development Commission	Tokuo Nanjō	Liberal Democratic	December 23, 1956	February 25, 1957
Director of the Administrative Management Agency Chair of the National Public Safety Commission	Tanzan Ishibashi (acting)	Liberal Democratic	December 23, 1956	December 23, 1956
Director of the Administrative Management Agency Chair of the National Public Safety Commission	Tomejiro Okubo	Liberal Democratic	December 23, 1956	February 25, 1957
Director of the Hokkaido Regional Development Agency	Tanzan Ishibashi (acting)	Liberal Democratic	December 23, 1956	December 27, 1956
Director of the Hokkaido Regional Development Agency	Matsusuke Kamamura	Liberal Democratic	December 27, 1956	February 25, 1957
Director of the Home Affairs Agency	Tanzan Ishibashi (acting)	Liberal Democratic	December 23, 1956	December 23, 1956
Director of the Home Affairs Agency	Isaji Tanaka	Liberal Democratic	December 23, 1956	February 25, 1957
Director of the Defense Agency	Tanzan Ishibashi (acting)	Liberal Democratic	December 23, 1956	December 31, 1956
Director of the Defense Agency	Nobusuke Kishi (acting)	Liberal Democratic	December 31, 1956	February 2, 1957
Director of the Defense Agency	Akira Kodaki	Liberal Democratic	February 2, 1957	February 25, 1957
Director of the Economic Planning Agency; Director of the Science and Technology Agency	Tanzan Ishibashi (acting)	Liberal Democratic	December 23, 1956	December 23, 1956
Director of the Economic Planning Agency; Director of the Science and Technology Agency	Koichi Uda	Liberal Democratic	December 23, 1956	February 25, 1957
Chief Cabinet Secretary	Hirohide Ishida	Liberal Democratic	December 23, 1956	February 25, 1957
Director-General of the Cabinet Legislation Bureau	Shūzō Hayashi	Independent	December 23, 1956	February 25, 1957
Deputy Chief Cabinet Secretary (Political Affairs)	Naokichi Kitazawa	Liberal Democratic	December 23, 1956	February 25, 1957
Deputy Chief Cabinet Secretary (General Affairs)	Eiichi Tanaka	Independent	December 23, 1956	February 25, 1957
