= Second Kishi cabinet =

Cabinet of Japan (1958–1960)

Ishibashi Cabinet
- 57th Cabinet of Japan

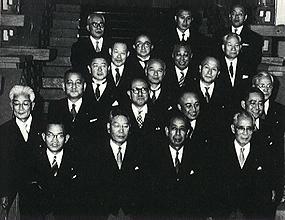
- Initial composition
- Date formed: June 12, 1958
- Date dissolved: July 19, 1960

People and organisations
- Emperor: Shōwa
- Prime Minister: Nobusuke Kishi
- Deputy Prime Minister: Shūji Masutani (from June 18, 1959)
- Member party: Liberal Democratic Party
- Status in legislature: House of Representatives: Majority; House of Councillors: Minority (until June 2, 1959), Majority (from June 2, 1959)
- Opposition parties: Japan Socialist Party; Japanese Communist Party; Ryokufūkai

History
- Elections: 1958 general election 1959 councillors election
- Legislature term: 29th-34th National Diet
- Predecessor: First Kishi Cabinet
- Successor: First Ikeda Cabinet

The Second Kishi Cabinet is the 57th Cabinet of Japan headed by Nobusuke Kishi from June 12, 1958, to July 19, 1960.

== Cabinet ==
Portfolio	Name	Political party	Term start	Term end
Prime Minister	Nobusuke Kishi	Liberal Democratic	June 12, 1958	July 19, 1960
Minister of Justice	Kiichi Aichi	Liberal Democratic	June 12, 1958	June 18, 1959
Minister for Foreign Affairs	Aiichirō Fujiyama	Liberal Democratic	June 12, 1958	July 19, 1960
Minister of Finance	Eisaku Satō	Liberal Democratic	June 12, 1958	July 19, 1960
Minister of Education	Hirokichi Nadao	Liberal Democratic	June 12, 1958	December 31, 1958
Minister of Education	Ryōgo Hashimoto (acting)	Liberal Democratic	December 31, 1958	January 12, 1959
Minister of Education	Ryōgo Hashimoto	Liberal Democratic	January 12, 1959	June 18, 1959
Minister of Health	Ryōgo Hashimoto	Liberal Democratic	June 12, 1958	January 12, 1959
Minister of Health	Michita Sakata	Liberal Democratic	January 12, 1959	June 18, 1959
Minister of Agriculture, Forestry and Fisheries	Kunio Miura	Liberal Democratic	June 12, 1958	June 18, 1959
Minister of International Trade and Industry	Tatsunosuke Takasaki	Liberal Democratic	June 12, 1958	June 18, 1959
Minister of Transport	Mamoru Nagano	Liberal Democratic	June 12, 1958	April 24, 1959
Minister of Transport	Yuzō Shigemune	Liberal Democratic	April 24, 1959	June 18, 1959
Minister of Posts	Yutaka Terao	Liberal Democratic	June 12, 1958	June 18, 1959
Minister of Labor	Tadao Kuraishi	Liberal Democratic	June 12, 1958	June 18, 1959
Minister of Construction; Chairman of the National Capital Region Development Commission	Saburō Endō	Liberal Democratic	June 12, 1958	June 18, 1959
Chairman of the National Public Safety Commission	Masashi Aoki	Liberal Democratic	June 12, 1958	June 18, 1959
Director of the Administrative Management Agency; Director of the Hokkaido Regional Development Agency	Kikuichirō Yamaguchi	Liberal Democratic	June 12, 1958	June 18, 1959
Director of the Autonomy Agency	Masashi Aoki	Liberal Democratic	June 12, 1958	October 28, 1958
Director of the Autonomy Agency	Kiichi Aichi	Liberal Democratic	October 28, 1958	January 12, 1959
Director of the Autonomy Agency	Masashi Aoki	Liberal Democratic	January 12, 1959	June 18, 1959
Director of the Defense Agency	Gisen Satō	Liberal Democratic	June 12, 1958	January 12, 1959
Director of the Defense Agency	Shigejirō Inō	Liberal Democratic	January 12, 1959	June 18, 1959
Director of the Economic Planning Agency	Takeo Miki	Liberal Democratic	June 12, 1958	December 31, 1958
Director of the Economic Planning Agency	Tatsunosuke Takasaki (acting)	Liberal Democratic	December 31, 1958	January 12, 1959
Director of the Economic Planning Agency	Kōichi Sekō	Liberal Democratic	January 12, 1959	June 18, 1959
Director of the Science and Technology Agency	Takeo Miki	Liberal Democratic	June 12, 1958	December 31, 1958
Director of the Science and Technology Agency	Tatsunosuke Takasaki (acting)	Liberal Democratic	December 31, 1958	January 12, 1959
Director of the Science and Technology Agency	Tatsunosuke Takasaki	Liberal Democratic	January 12, 1959	June 18, 1959
Minister of State	Hayato Ikeda	Liberal Democratic	June 12, 1958	December 31, 1958
Chief Cabinet Secretary	Munenori Akagi	Liberal Democratic	June 12, 1958	June 18, 1959
Director-General of the Prime Minister's Office	Raizo Matsuno	Liberal Democratic	June 12, 1958	June 18, 1959
Director-General of the Cabinet Legislation Bureau	Shūzō Hayashi	Independent	June 12, 1958	July 19, 1960
Deputy Chief Cabinet Secretary (Political Affairs)	Shunichi Matsumoto	Liberal Democratic	June 14, 1958	July 19, 1960
Deputy Chief Cabinet Secretary (General Affairs)	Shunichi Suzuki	Independent	June 14, 1958	June 9, 1959
Deputy Director-General of the Prime Minister's Office	Asao Satō	Independent	June 12, 1958	July 19, 1960

== Reshuffled Cabinet ==
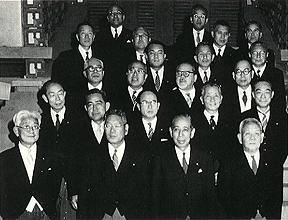
Reshuffled Cabinet

A Cabinet reshuffle took place on June 18, 1959.

Portfolio	Name	Political party	Term start	Term end
Prime Minister	Nobusuke Kishi	Liberal Democratic	June 12, 1958	July 19, 1960
Deputy Prime Minister; Minister of State; Director of the Administrative Management Agency	Shūji Masutani	Liberal Democratic	June 18, 1959	July 19, 1960
Minister of Justice	Hiroya Ino	Liberal Democratic	June 18, 1959	July 19, 1960
Minister for Foreign Affairs	Aiichirō Fujiyama	Liberal Democratic	June 18, 1959	July 19, 1960
Minister of Finance	Eisaku Satō	Liberal Democratic	June 18, 1959	July 19, 1960
Minister of Education	Takechiyo Matsuda	Liberal Democratic	June 18, 1959	July 19, 1960
Minister of Health	Yoshio Watanabe	Liberal Democratic	June 18, 1959	July 19, 1960
Minister of Agriculture, Forestry and Fisheries	Takeo Fukuda	Liberal Democratic	June 18, 1959	July 19, 1960
Minister of International Trade and Industry	Hayato Ikeda	Liberal Democratic	June 18, 1959	July 19, 1960
Minister of Transport	Wataru Narahashi	Liberal Democratic	June 18, 1959	July 19, 1960
Minister of Posts	Haruhiko Uetake	Liberal Democratic	June 18, 1959	July 19, 1960
Minister of Labor	Raizo Matsuno	Liberal Democratic	June 18, 1959	July 19, 1960
Minister of Construction; Chairman of the National Capital Region Development Commission; Minister of State for the Hokkaido Development Agency	Isamu Murakami	Liberal Democratic	June 18, 1959	July 19, 1960
Chairman of the National Public Safety Commission	Kanichirō Ishihara	Liberal Democratic	June 18, 1959	July 19, 1960
Director of the Autonomy Agency	Kanichirō Ishihara	Liberal Democratic	June 18, 1959	July 1, 1960
Minister of Home Affairs	Kanichirō Ishihara	Liberal Democratic	July 1, 1960	July 19, 1960
Director of the Defense Agency	Munenori Akagi	Liberal Democratic	June 18, 1959	July 19, 1960
Director of the Economic Planning Agency	Watarō Kanno	Liberal Democratic	June 18, 1959	July 19, 1960
Director of the Science and Technology Agency	Yasuhiro Nakasone	Liberal Democratic	June 18, 1959	July 19, 1960
Chief Cabinet Secretary	Etsusaburo Shiina	Liberal Democratic	June 18, 1959	July 19, 1960
Director-General of the Prime Minister's Office	Tokuyasu Fukuda	Liberal Democratic	June 18, 1959	July 19, 1960
Director-General of the Cabinet Legislation Bureau	Shūzō Hayashi	Independent	June 12, 1958	July 19, 1960
Deputy Chief Cabinet Secretary (Political Affairs)	Shunichi Matsumoto	Liberal Democratic	June 14, 1958	July 19, 1960
Deputy Chief Cabinet Secretary (General Affairs)	Kōshō Ogasa	Liberal Democratic	June 18, 1959	July 19, 1960
Deputy Chief Cabinet Secretary (Prime Minister's Office)	Asao Satō	Independent	June 12, 1958	July 19, 1960
