= First Kaifu cabinet =

Cabinet of Japan (1989–1990)

First Kaifu Cabinet
- 76th Cabinet of Japan

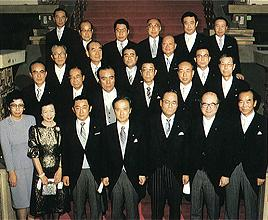
- Date formed: August 10, 1989
- Date dissolved: February 28, 1990

People and organisations
- Emperor: Akihito
- Prime Minister: Toshiki Kaifu
- Member party: Liberal Democratic Party
- Status in legislature: Majority government (Lower House)
- Opposition parties: Japan Socialist Party; Kōmeitō; Democratic Socialist Party; Japanese Communist Party

History
- Election: 39th general election (1990)
- Predecessor: Uno Cabinet
- Successor: Second Kaifu Cabinet

The First Kaifu Cabinet is the 76th Cabinet of Japan headed by Toshiki Kaifu from August 10, 1989, to February 28, 1990. Kaifu succeed at promoting two women as ministers and defying Takeshita faction's demand of reappointment of Uno cabinet members, but had to follow factional balance: Takeshita faction has given five ministries, while Abe, Miyazawa and Nakasone factions each received four. Komoto faction, Kaifu's own, only got two ministries.

== Cabinet ==
Portfolio	Minister	Special mission etc.	Note
Prime Minister	Toshiki Kaifu		Komoto faction
Minister of Justice	Masao Gotō		Independent
Minister for Foreign Affairs	Taro Nakayama		Abe faction
Minister of Finance	Ryutaro Hashimoto		Takeshita faction
Minister of Education	Kazuya Ishibashi	National Diet Library Liaison and Coordination Committee member	Abe faction
Minister of Health	Saburō Toida	In charge of Pension issues	Takeshita faction
Minister of Agriculture, Forestry and Fisheries	Michihiko Kano		Abe faction
Minister of International Trade and Industry	Hikaru Matsunaga		Nakasone faction
Minister of Transport	Takami Eto	In charge of New Tokyo International Airport issues	Nakasone faction
Minister of Posts	Senpachi Ōishi		Nakasone faction
Minister of Labor	Jōji Fukushima		Independent
Minister of Construction	Shōzō Harada		Miyazawa faction
Minister of Home Affairs; Chair of the National Public Safety Commission	Kōzō Watanabe		Takeshita faction
Chief Cabinet Secretary	Tokuo Yamashita		Komoto faction, Resigned on August 25, 1989
Chief Cabinet Secretary	Mayumi Moriyama	First female officeholder	Komoto faction, Appointed on August 25, 1989
Director of the Management and Coordination Agency	Kiyoshi Mizuno		Miyazawa faction
Director of the Hokkaido Regional Development Agency; Director of the Okinawa Regional Development Agency	Fumio Abe		Miyazawa faction
Director of the Defense Agency	Jūrō Matsumoto		Abe faction
Director of the Economic Planning Agency	Sumiko Takahara		Non-legislator
Director of the Science and Technology Agency	Eizaburō Saitō	Chair of the Atomic Energy Commission	Independent
Director of the Environment Agency	Mayumi Moriyama		Komoto faction, Resigned on August 25, 1989
Director of the Environment Agency	Setsu Shiga		Komoto faction, Appointed on August 25, 1989
Director of the National Land Agency	Hajime Ishii	In charge of Land Measures for the International Garden and Greenery Exposition	Takeshita faction
Director-General of the Cabinet Legislation Bureau	Atsuo Kudō		
Deputy Chief Cabinet Secretary (for Political Affairs)	Setsu Shiga		Resigned on August 25, 1989
Deputy Chief Cabinet Secretary (for Political Affairs)	Takao Fujimoto		Appointed on August 25, 1989
Deputy Chief Cabinet Secretary (for General Affairs)	Nobuo Ishihara		
