= Second Kaifu cabinet =

Cabinet of Japan (1990–1991)

Second Kaifu Cabinet
- 77th Cabinet of Japan

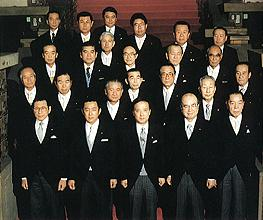
- Date formed: February 28, 1990
- Date dissolved: December 29, 1990

People and organisations
- Emperor: Akihito
- Prime Minister: Toshiki Kaifu
- Member party: Liberal Democratic Party
- Status in legislature: Majority government (Lower House)
- Opposition parties: Japan Socialist Party; Kōmeitō; Democratic Socialist Party; Japanese Communist Party

History
- Predecessor: First Kaifu Cabinet
- Successor: Second Kaifu Cabinet (Reshuffle)

The Second Kaifu Cabinet is the 77th Cabinet of Japan headed by Toshiki Kaifu from February 28, 1990, to November 5, 1991.

== Cabinet ==
Portfolio	Minister	Special mission etc.	Note
Prime Minister	Toshiki Kaifu		
Minister of Justice	Shin Hasegawa		Resigned on September 13, 1990
Minister of Justice	Seiroku Kajiyama		Appointed on September 13, 1990
Minister for Foreign Affairs	Taro Nakayama		
Minister of Finance	Ryutaro Hashimoto		
Minister of Education	Kosuke Hori	National Diet Library Liaison and Coordination Committee member	
Minister of Health	Yūji Tsushima	In charge of Pension issues	
Minister of Agriculture, Forestry and Fisheries	Tomio Yamamoto		
Minister of International Trade and Industry	Kabun Mutō		
Minister of Transport	Akira Ōno	In charge of New Tokyo International Airport issues	
Minister of Posts	Takashi Fukaya		
Minister of Labor	Shunpei Tsukahara		
Minister of Construction	Tamisuke Watanuki		
Minister of Home Affairs; Chair of the National Public Safety Commission	Keiwa Okuda		
Chief Cabinet Secretary	Misoji Sakamoto		
Director of the Management and Coordination Agency	Jun Shiozaki		
Director of the Hokkaido Regional Development Agency; Director of the Okinawa Regional Development Agency	Shigetami Sunada		Resigned on September 13, 1990
Director of the Hokkaido Regional Development Agency; Director of the Okinawa Regional Development Agency	Yoshiaki Kibe		Appointed on September 13, 1990
Director of the Defense Agency	Yozo Ishikawa		
Director of the Economic Planning Agency	Hideyuki Aizawa		
Director of the Science and Technology Agency	Tomoji Ōshima	Chair of the Atomic Energy Commission	
Director of the Environment Agency	Ishimatsu Kitakawa		
Director of the National Land Agency	Moriyoshi Satō	In charge of Land Measures; For the International Garden and Greenery Exposition	
Director-General of the Cabinet Legislation Bureau	Atsuo Kudō		
Deputy Chief Cabinet Secretary (for Political Affairs)	Tadamori Ōshima		
Deputy Chief Cabinet Secretary (for General Affairs)	Nobuo Ishihara		

== Reshuffled Cabinet ==
Second Kaifu Cabinet (Reshuffle)
- 77th Cabinet of Japan

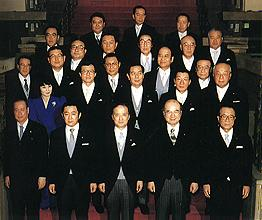
- Date formed: December 29, 1990
- Date dissolved: November 5, 1991

People and organisations
- Emperor: Akihito
- Prime Minister: Toshiki Kaifu
- Member party: Liberal Democratic Party
- Status in legislature: Majority government (Lower House)
- Opposition parties: Japan Socialist Party; Kōmeitō; Democratic Socialist Party; Japanese Communist Party

History
- Predecessor: Second Kaifu Cabinet
- Successor: Miyazawa Cabinet

The Cabinet reshuffle took place on December 29, 1990.

== Cabinet ==
Portfolio	Minister	Special mission etc.	Note
Prime Minister	Toshiki Kaifu		
Minister of Justice	Megumu Satō		
Minister for Foreign Affairs	Taro Nakayama		
Minister of Finance	Ryutaro Hashimoto		Resigned on October 14, 1991
Minister of Finance	Toshiki Kaifu	Concurrently serving as Prime Minister	Appointed on October 14, 1991
Minister of Education	Yutaka Inoue	National Diet Library Liaison and Coordination Committee member	
Minister of Health	Shin'ichirō Shimojō	In charge of Pension issues	
Minister of Agriculture, Forestry and Fisheries	Motoji Kondō		
Minister of International Trade and Industry	Eiichi Nakao		
Minister of Transport	Kanezō Muraoka	In charge of New Tokyo International Airport issues	
Minister of Posts	Katsutsugu Sekiya		
Minister of Labor	Sadatoshi Ozato		
Minister of Construction	Yūji Ōtsuka		
Minister of Home Affairs; Chair of the National Public Safety Commission	Akira Fukida		
Chief Cabinet Secretary	Misoji Sakamoto		
Director of the Management and Coordination Agency	Man Sasaki		
Director of the Hokkaido Regional Development Agency; Director of the Okinawa Regional Development Agency	Yōichi Tani		
Director of the Defense Agency	Yukihiko Ikeda		
Director of the Economic Planning Agency	Michio Ochi		
Director of the Science and Technology Agency	Akiko Santō	Chair of the Atomic Energy Commission	
Director of the Environment Agency	Kazuo Aichi		
Director of the National Land Agency	Mamoru Nishida	In charge of Land Measures; For the International Garden and Greenery Exposition	
Director-General of the Cabinet Legislation Bureau	Atsuo Kudō		
Deputy Chief Cabinet Secretary (for Political Affairs)	Tadamori Ōshima		
Deputy Chief Cabinet Secretary (for General Affairs)	Nobuo Ishihara		
