= Masayoshi Ito =

Japanese politician (1913–1994)

- 伊東 正義
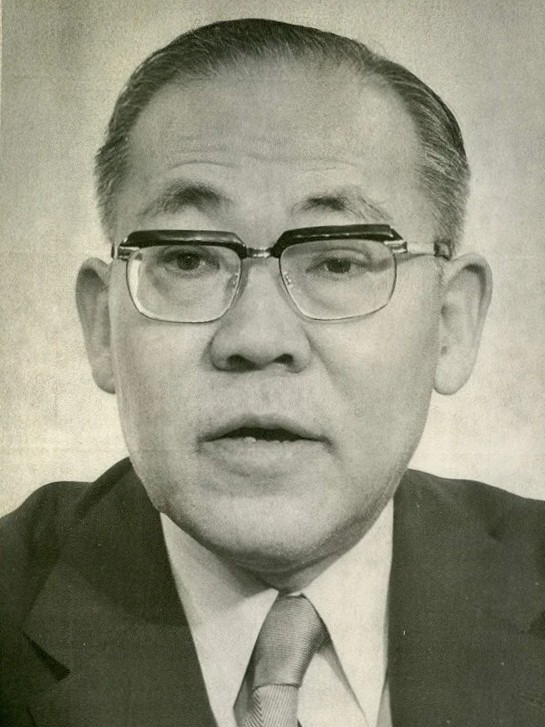
- Itō in 1980

Acting Prime Minister of Japan
- In office 12 June 1980 – 17 July 1980
- Monarch: Hirohito
- Deputy: Himself
- Preceded by: Masayoshi Ōhira
- Succeeded by: Zenkō Suzuki

Deputy Prime Minister of Japan
- In office 11 June 1980 – 7 July 1980
- Prime Minister: Masayoshi Ōhira; Himself
- Preceded by: Takeo Fukuda (1976)
- Succeeded by: Shin Kanemaru (1986)
Ministerial offices
Minister for Foreign Affairs
In office 17 July 1980 – 18 May 1981
Prime Minister	Zenkō Suzuki
Preceded by	Saburo Okita
Succeeded by	Sunao Sonoda
Chief Cabinet Secretary
In office 9 November 1979 – 17 July 1980
Prime Minister	Masayoshi Ōhira; Himself
Preceded by	Rokusuke Tanaka
Succeeded by	Kiichi Miyazawa

Member of the House of Representatives
- In office 29 December 1969 – 18 June 1993
- Preceded by: Azuma Karahashi
- Succeeded by: Fumiaki Saitō
- Constituency: Fukushima 2nd
- In office 21 November 1963 – 27 December 1966
- Preceded by: Sakuma Ōtake
- Succeeded by: Azuma Karahashi
- Constituency: Fukushima 2nd

Personal details
- Born: 15 December 1913 Aizuwakamatsu, Fukushima, Japan
- Died: 21 May 1994 (aged 80) Tokyo, Japan
- Party: Liberal Democratic
- Education: Tokyo Imperial University
- a: Until 7 July 1980

Masayoshi Ito (伊東 正義, Itō Masayoshi; 15 December 1913 – 21 May 1994) was a Japanese political figure. He served as acting Prime Minister of Japan in 1980 after the sudden death of Masayoshi Ōhira. He then served as foreign minister of Japan from 1980 to 1981.

== Early life ==
Ito was born on 15 December 1913 in Aizuwakamatsu, Fukushima, where his grandfather was a member of the Aizu clan.

== Career ==
Following the death of Masayoshi Ōhira, Ito became the acting prime minister for a brief period of about a month. In this brief period, he received a report in July from the Comprehensive National Security Study Group which encouraged Ito to strengthen Japan–United States relations whilst also increasing Japanese military self-sufficiency in light of developments within socialist Asia, such as the Sino-Vietnamese War and the Soviet invasion in Afghanistan, which seemed to signal reductions in American power on the continent. Following this brief period, Ito served as Foreign Minister from July 1980 to May 1981 in the cabinet of Zenkō Suzuki, but he resigned from this position following American outrage at what the US government perceived as the Japanese government distancing itself from the US-Japanese military alliance following the previously mentioned Asian war developments.

Ito developed a reputation as a "clean" and honest politician who did not become mired in scandals, and for this reason was suggested as a possible successor to Prime Minister Noboru Takeshita after he resigned in disgrace due to the Recruit scandal, although Ito expressed doubts about whether the LDP was serious about reform after top party bosses rejected his comprehensive reform agenda and he thus declined.

== Personal life ==
Ito was a cinephile and a fan of Mitsuko Mori. Ito, then battling with diabetes, died on 21 May 1994.

Party political offices
Preceded by Masayuki Fujio	Chair, Policy Research Committee of the Liberal Democratic Party of Japan; 1986–1987	Succeeded by Michio Watanabe
Preceded by Shintaro Abe	Chair, General Affairs Committee of the Liberal Democratic Party of Japan; 1987–1989	Succeeded by Kiyoshi Mizuno
Political offices
Preceded by Rokusuke Tanaka	Chief Cabinet Secretary; 1979–1980	Succeeded by Kiichi Miyazawa
Preceded by Takeo Fukuda	Deputy Prime Minister of Japan; 1980	Succeeded by Shin Kanemaru
Preceded by Masayoshi Ōhira	Prime Minister of Japan; Acting; 1980	Succeeded by Zenko Suzuki
Preceded by Saburo Ōkita	Minister of Foreign Affairs; 1980–1981	Succeeded by Sunao Sonoda
