= Masajuro Shiokawa =

Japanese politician

Masajūrō Shiokawa
- 塩川 正十郎
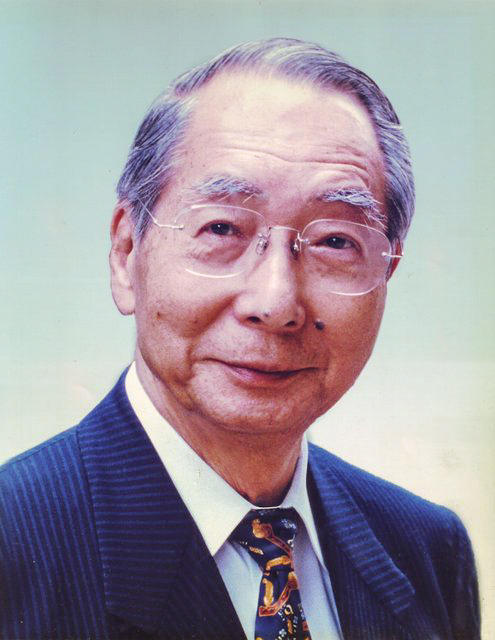
- Official portrait, 2001

Minister of Finance
- In office 26 April 2001 – 22 September 2003
- Prime Minister: Junichiro Koizumi
- Preceded by: Hikaru Matsunaga
- Succeeded by: Sadakazu Tanigaki

Minister of Home Affairs
- In office 5 November 1991 – 12 December 1992
- Prime Minister: Kiichi Miyazawa
- Preceded by: Akira Fukida
- Succeeded by: Keijiro Murata

Chief Cabinet Secretary
- In office 2 June 1989 – 10 August 1989
- Prime Minister: Sōsuke Uno
- Preceded by: Keizō Obuchi
- Succeeded by: Tokuo Yamashita

Minister of Education
- In office 9 September 1986 – 6 November 1987
- Prime Minister: Yasuhiro Nakasone
- Preceded by: Masayuki Fujio
- Succeeded by: Gentaro Nakajima

Minister of Transport
- In office 17 July 1980 – 30 November 1981
- Prime Minister: Zenkō Suzuki
- Preceded by: Usaburō Chisaki III
- Succeeded by: Tokusaburo Kosaka

Deputy Chief Cabinet Secretary (Political affairs)
- In office 24 December 1976 – 28 November 1977
- Prime Minister: Takeo Fukuda
- Preceded by: Hyosuke Kujiraoka
- Succeeded by: Yoshirō Mori

Member of the House of Representatives
- In office 26 June 2000 – 10 October 2003
- Preceded by: Akira Nishino
- Succeeded by: Akira Nishino
- Constituency: Osaka 13th
- In office 30 January 1967 – 27 September 1996
- Preceded by: Saburō Ōkura
- Succeeded by: Constituency abolished
- Constituency: Osaka 4th

Personal details
- Born: 13 October 1921 Fuse, Osaka, Japan
- Died: 19 September 2015 (aged 93) Osaka, Japan
- Party: Liberal Democratic
- Education: Keio University

Masajuro Shiokawa (塩川 正十郎, Shiokawa Masajūrō; 13 October 1921 – 19 September 2015) was a Japanese economist and politician.

== Early life ==
Shiokawa was born in Fuse City (now Higashi-Osaka City), Osaka Prefecture. He graduated from the economics faculty of Keio University in 1944. He founded the Mitsuaki Corporation in 1946.

== Political career ==
He was a public official in the Fuse City government from 1964 to 1966, and directed the merger to form Higashi-Osaka in 1966. In 1967, he was elected to the House of Representatives, representing the 4th District of Osaka.

Shiokawa served as Parliamentary Vice Minister of International Trade and Industry from 1972 to 1973, Deputy Chief Cabinet Secretary from 1976 to 1977, Commerce and Industry Committee Chairman from 1979 to 1980, Minister of Transport from 1980 to 1981 (under Prime Minister Zenko Suzuki), Minister of Education from 1986 to 1987 (under PM Yasuhiro Nakasone), Chief Cabinet Secretary for three months in 1989 (under PM Sōsuke Uno), and Minister of Home Affairs from 1991 to 1992.

Although Shiokawa became Secretary-General of the LDP in 1995, he lost his seat in the 1996 general elections, and was not re-elected until 2000.

In 2001, Junichiro Koizumi tapped Shiokawa to serve as Minister of Finance. He resigned in 2003 and decided not to seek re-election that year.

Shiokawa was dean of Toyo University, director of the Kansai Shogi Hall, and active within the Japan Sumo Association.

== Death ==
Shiokawa died on September 20, 2015, of pneumonia in Osaka, Japan at the age of 93.

== Honours ==
From the corresponding article in the Japanese Wikipedia

- Grand Cordon of the Order of the Rising Sun
- Conferred an Honorary Doctorate in Humanities from The University of Cambodia (2004)

=== Foreign honour ===
- Malaysia : Honorary Commander of the Order of Loyalty to the Crown of Malaysia (P.S.M.) (2004)

Political offices
Preceded by Hyosuke Kujiraoka	Deputy Chief Cabinet Secretary; 1976–1977	Succeeded by Yoshirō Mori
Preceded by Usaburō Chisaki III	Minister of Transport; 1980–1981	Succeeded by Tokusaburo Kosaka
Preceded by Masayuki Fujio	Minister of Education; 1986–1987	Succeeded by Gentaro Nakajima
Preceded by Keizō Obuchi	Chief Cabinet Secretary of Japan; 1989	Succeeded by Tokuo Yamashita
Preceded by Akira Fukida	Chairman of the National Public Safety Commission; 1991–1992	Succeeded by Keijiro Murata
Preceded by Akira Fukida	Minister of Home Affairs; 1991–1992	Succeeded by Keijiro Murata
Preceded by Hikaru Matsunaga	Minister of Finance of Japan; 2001–2003	Succeeded by Sadakazu Tanigaki
House of Representatives (Japan)
Preceded by Takashi Hashiguchi	Chair, Committee on Commerce and Industry of the House of Representatives of Japan; 1979–1980	Succeeded by Eiji Nonaka
Preceded by Keizō Obuchi	Chair, Special Committee on Security of the House of Representatives of Japan; 1983–1984	Succeeded by Motoharu Morishita
Party political offices
Preceded by Takeo Nishioka	Chair, Research Commission on Tax System of the Liberal Democratic Party; 1990–1991	Succeeded by Kabun Mutō
Preceded by Kabun Mutō	Chair, General Council of the Liberal Democratic Party; 1995–1996	Succeeded by Yoshirō Mori
Academic offices
Preceded by Eiji Tanaka	Chairman of Toyo University; 1988–2000	Succeeded by Takuo Sugano
Other offices
Preceded by Kichizo Hosoda	Chair, Liberal National Congress; 2007–2015	Succeeded by Hideo Usui
Preceded by Nobuo Yamaguchi	Chair, People's Political Association; 2009–2015	Succeeded by Mitsuo Ōhashi
