= Masaharu Gotōda =

Japanese politician (1914–2005)

- 後藤田 正晴
- Gotōda in 1992

Deputy Prime Minister of Japan
- In office 8 April 1993 – 9 August 1993
- Prime Minister: Kiichi Miyazawa
- Preceded by: Michio Watanabe
- Succeeded by: Tsutomu Hata
Ministerial offices
Minister of Justice
In office 12 December 1992 – 9 August 1993
Prime Minister	Kiichi Miyazawa
Preceded by	Takashi Tawara
Succeeded by	Akira Mikazuki
Chief Cabinet Secretary
In office 28 December 1985 – 6 November 1987
Prime Minister	Yasuhiro Nakasone
Preceded by	Takao Fujinami
Succeeded by	Keizō Obuchi
In office 27 November 1982 – 27 December 1983
Prime Minister	Yasuhiro Nakasone
Preceded by	Kiichi Miyazawa
Succeeded by	Takao Fujinami
Director-General of the Management and Coordination Agency
In office 1 July 1984 – 28 December 1985
Prime Minister	Yasuhiro Nakasone
Preceded by	Office established
Succeeded by	Masumi Esaki
Director-General of the Administrative Management Agency
In office 27 December 1983 – 1 July 1984
Prime Minister	Yasuhiro Nakasone
Preceded by	Kunikichi Saitō
Succeeded by	Office abolished
Minister of Home Affairs
In office 9 November 1979 – 17 July 1980
Prime Minister	Masayoshi Ōhira
Preceded by	Naozō Shibuya
Succeeded by	Jirō Ishiba
Chairman of the National Public Safety Commission
In office 9 November 1979 – 17 July 1980
Prime Minister	Masayoshi Ōhira
Preceded by	Naozō Shibuya
Succeeded by	Jirō Ishiba
Director-General of the Hokkaido Development Agency
In office 9 November 1979 – 17 July 1980
Prime Minister	Masayoshi Ōhira
Preceded by	Naozō Shibuya
Succeeded by	Kenzaburo Hara
Deputy Chief Cabinet Secretary (Administrative affairs)
In office 7 July 1972 – 25 November 1973
Prime Minister	Kakuei Tanaka
Preceded by	Kin'ichi Koike
Succeeded by	Hiromori Kawashima

Member of the House of Representatives
- In office 10 December 1976 – 27 September 1996
- Preceded by: Daisuke Akita
- Succeeded by: Constituency abolished
- Constituency: Tokushima at-large

Commissioner General of the National Police Agency
- In office 12 August 1969 – 24 June 1972
- Preceded by: Hiroshi Arai
- Succeeded by: Mikio Takahashi

Personal details
- Born: 9 August 1914 Yoshinogawa, Tokushima, Japan
- Died: 19 September 2005 (aged 91) Bunkyō, Tokyo, Japan
- Party: Liberal Democratic
- Relatives: Masazumi Gotoda (great-nephew)
- Education: Tokyo Imperial University

Masaharu Gotōda (後藤田 正晴, Gotōda Masaharu, 9 August 1914 – 19 September 2005) was a Japanese bureaucrat and politician of the Liberal Democratic Party who served as Deputy Prime Minister of Japan in 1993. He also several in several other cabinet positions such as Chief Cabinet Secretary from 1982 to 1983 and 1985 to 1987 under Prime Minister Yasuhiro Nakasone and Minister of Justice from 1992 to 1993 under Prime Minister Kiichi Miyazawa.

Before becoming a politician Gotōda served as Commissioner General of the National Police Agency from 1969 to 1972 and Deputy Chief Cabinet Secretary from 1972 to 1973.

== Early life ==
Masaharu Gotōda was born on 9 August 1914 in Higashiyama Village in the Oe District of Tokushima Prefecture. Gotōda studied law and politics at Tokyo Imperial University. After graduating in 1938 he joined the prestigious Home Ministry. The following year Gotōda was drafted into the Imperial Japanese Army. He served as a liaison officer in Taiwan for most of the war. After the surrender of Japan he was taken as a prisoner of war by the Chinese National Revolutionary Army.

== Post-war bureaucratic career ==
Gotōda was repatriated to Japan in 1947 and returned to the Home Ministry. He was soon assigned to the Tokyo Metropolitan Police Department. After the abolition of the Home Ministry he was attached to the Headquarters of the National Rural Police, and the National Police Agency once it was founded in 1954.

In 1959, Gotōda was appointed chief secretary in the Home Affairs Agency, another remnant of the old Home Ministry, and later the same year he became chief of the Local Tax Bureau. But he returned to the National Police Agency as chief secretary in May 1962, chief of the Security Bureau in March 1963 and chief of the Police Affairs Bureau in March 1965. In May of the same year he was appointed Deputy Commissioner General.

After four years Gotōda was appointed Commissioner General of the National Police Agency in August 1969. He served as a Commissioner General during a turbulent period for Japanese society, with several incidents of left-wing terrorism such as the Yodogo hijacking, the Asama-Sansō incident and the Lod Airport massacre. Gotōda retired from the National Police Agency in June 1972.

The following month Kakuei Tanaka became Prime Minister and appointed Gotōda to the position of Deputy Chief Cabinet Secretary for administrative affairs. The two men had been acquainted since the 1950s.

== Political career ==
Gotōda resigned in November 1973 in order to prepare for running as a LDP candidate for the Tokushima prefectural district in the 1974 House of Councillors election with the backing of the Tanaka faction. However, Kentarō Kujime, who was a close aide of Takeo Miki was also running in the same constituency. This election became a proxy battle between the Tanaka and Miki factions of the LDP. In the end, Gotōda lost the election. Many from his campaign were later arrested for election violations. Gotōda later called the election "the biggest stain on my life."

Gotōda worked to redeem his reputation in the constituency and in the 1976 House of Representatives election he was elected as a LDP candidate for Tokushima district. He joined the Tanaka faction in the LDP. Gotōda served as Minister of Home Affairs and Chairman of the National Public Safety Commission under Prime Minister Masayoshi Ohira from November 1979 to July 1980.

When Yasuhiro Nakasone became prime minister in November 1982, Gotōda was appointed his Chief Cabinet Secretary. At the time, the Chief Cabinet Secretary almost always came from the same faction as the prime minister. The fact that Gotōda from the Tanaka faction was appointed was a reason why the Nakasone cabinet was initially mocked as the "Tanakasone Cabinet." Nakasone himself ascribed the appointment to Gotōda's experience in handling crisis. Gotōda became known as a shrewd and effective Chief Cabinet Secretary. His association with intelligence and the police earned him nicknames, such as the "Japanese Joseph Fouché" and the "Japanese Andropov."

In a reshuffle in December 1983 Gotōda was moved to the position of Director General of the Administrative Management Agency. In July the following year the agency was merged with parts of the Prime Minister's Office to form the Management and Coordination Agency, with Gotōda as the first director general. He returned to the position of Chief Cabinet Secretary in December 1985. When the Tanaka faction split into the Takeshita faction and the Nikaidō group in July 1987 he didn't choose a side and became non-factional. Gotōda left his post when Prime Minister Nakasone left office in November 1987.

Gotōda was appointed Minister of Justice in the cabinet of Kiichi Miyazawa in December 1992. He ended the de facto moratorium on the death penalty in place since November 1989 when he ordered the execution three death row inmates in March 1993. Gotōda was appointed Deputy Prime Minister in April 1993, after Deputy Prime Minister Michio Watanabe resigned due to illness. Gotōda left after the LDP lost power in the July 1993 election. Gotōda declined to run in the 1996 election and retired.

His grandnephew Masazumi Gotōda was elected to the House of Representatives in 2000.

Masaharu Gotōda died of pneumonia on 19 September 2005 at the age of 91.

Government offices
Preceded by Hiroshi Arai	Commissioner General of the National Police Agency; 1969–1972	Succeeded by Mikio Takahashi
Preceded by Kin'ichi Koike	Deputy Chief Cabinet Secretary (for administrative affairs); 1972–1973	Succeeded by Hiromori Kawashima
Political offices
Preceded by Naozō Shibuya	Minister of Home Affairs; 1979-1980	Succeeded by Jirō Ishiba
Preceded by Naozō Shibuya	Chairman of the National Public Safety Commission; 1979-1980	Succeeded by Jirō Ishiba
Preceded by Naozō Shibuya	Director General of the Hokkaido Development Agency; 1979-1980	Succeeded by Kenzaburo Hara
Preceded by Kiichi Miyazawa	Chief Cabinet Secretary; 1982–1983	Succeeded by Takao Fujinami
Preceded by Kunikichi Saitō	Director General of the Administrative Management Agency; 1983–1984	Office abolished
Office created	Director General of the Management and Coordination Agency; 1984–1985	Succeeded by Masumi Esaki
Preceded by Takao Fujinami	Chief Cabinet Secretary; 1985–1987	Succeeded by Keizo Obuchi
Preceded by Takashi Tawara	Minister of Justice; 1992–1993	Succeeded by Akira Mikazuki
Preceded by Michio Watanabe	Deputy Prime Minister of Japan; 1993	Succeeded by Tsutomu Hata
