= Hirohide Ishida =

Japanese politician (1914–1993)

- 石田 博英
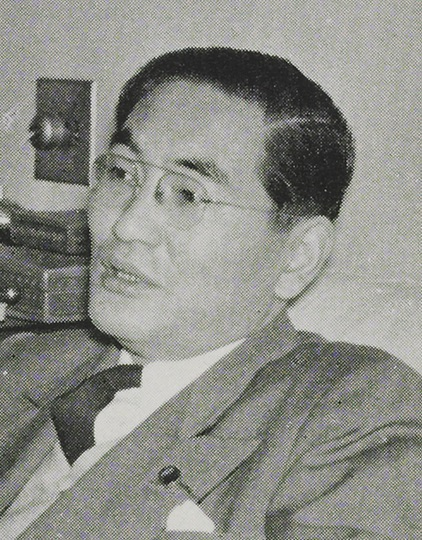
- Ishida in 1956

Minister of Labour
- In office 14 December 1976 – 28 November 1977
- Prime Minister: Takeo Fukuda
- Preceded by: Sachio Urano
- Succeeded by: Katushi Fujii
- In office 18 July 1964 – 3 June 1965
- Prime Minister: Eisaku Satō; Hayato Ikeda
- Preceded by: Takeo Ohashi
- Succeeded by: Hisao Kodaira
- In office 19 July 1960 – 18 July 1961
- Prime Minister: Hayato Ikeda
- Preceded by: Raizo Matsuno
- Succeeded by: Kenji Fukunaga
- In office 10 July 1957 – 12 June 1958
- Prime Minister: Nobusuke Kishi
- Preceded by: Shūtarō Matsuura
- Succeeded by: Tadao Kuraishi

Minister of Transport
- In office 15 September 1976 – 14 December 1976
- Prime Minister: Takeo Miki
- Preceded by: Mutsuo Kimura
- Succeeded by: Hajime Tamura

Chief Cabinet Secretary
- In office 23 December 1956 – 10 July 1957
- Prime Minister: Tanzan Ishibashi; Nobusuke Kishi
- Preceded by: Ryūtaro Nemoto
- Succeeded by: Kiichi Aichi

Member of the House of Representatives
- In office 25 April 1947 – 28 November 1983
- Preceded by: Constituency established
- Succeeded by: Hosei Norota
- Constituency: Akita 1st

Personal details
- Born: 12 December 1914 Futatsui, Akita, Japan
- Died: 14 October 1993 (aged 78)
- Party: Liberal Democratic
- Other political affiliations: JLP (1947–1948); DLP (1948–1950); LP (1950–1953); LP–H (1953–1954); JDP (1954–1955)
- Relatives: Yukiko Miyake (granddaughter)
- Education: Waseda University

Hirohide Ishida (石田 博英, Ishida Hirohide; 12 December 1914 – 14 October 1993) was a Japanese politician who served in the cabinets of multiple conservative administrations. In the 1980s, it was revealed that the KGB considered him to be an agent of the Soviet Union.

== Early life ==
Born in Noshiro, Akita, Ishida entered Waseda University, where he majored in political science and economics. After graduating in 1939, he joined Chugai Shōgyō Shimpo (later renamed Nihon Keizai Shimbun) and was appointed as its chief correspondent in Shanghai.

== Political career ==
In 1947, Ishida was elected to the House of Representatives. He joined the Liberal Democratic Party (LDP) in 1955, serving as Chief Cabinet Secretary under two prime ministers, Tanzan Ishibashi and Nobusuke Kishi, from 23 December 1956 to 10 July 1957. Widely viewed as a friend and proponent of labor unions (an unusual stance in the pro-business LDP), he was also appointed to five terms as minister of labor under four different prime ministers, in addition to one term as minister of transport. While minister of labor under Prime Minister Hayato Ikeda in 1960, Ishida successfully negotiated the end of the 1960 Miike Coal Mine Strike, which remains the largest labor-management dispute in Japanese history.

In January 1963, Ishida published an article in Chūō Kōron predicting that the Liberal Democratic Party would lose power to the Japan Socialist Party by 1970 due to ongoing changes in Japanese society, including urbanization, increasing education, and the decreasing number of farmers, who were generally seen as fundamental supporters of the LDP. Ishida's article shocked the LDP, but was hailed as perceptive, and stimulated the party to make a number of reforms, including to changing its policies to increase its appeal among urban workers.

== KGB agent ==
Ishida had formed and chaired the Japan-USSR Friendship Parliamentarians' Union in 1973, visiting Moscow in 1973, 1974 and 1977. In 1982 Stanislav Levchenko, a KGB Major who had defected to the United States in 1979, testified before the U.S. Congress that Ishida was an agent for the Soviet Union, codenamed "HOOVER". This was later confirmed in the "Mitrokhin Documents" smuggled out of the Soviet Union by Vasily Mitrokhin, a former KGB employee who fled to England in 1992. In response to Levchenko's revelations, the CIA and the Japanese police launched an investigation, and Ishida abruptly left politics in November 1983. However, the investigation ultimately concluded that Ishida had not leaked any sensitive information.

== Ishida Rose Garden ==
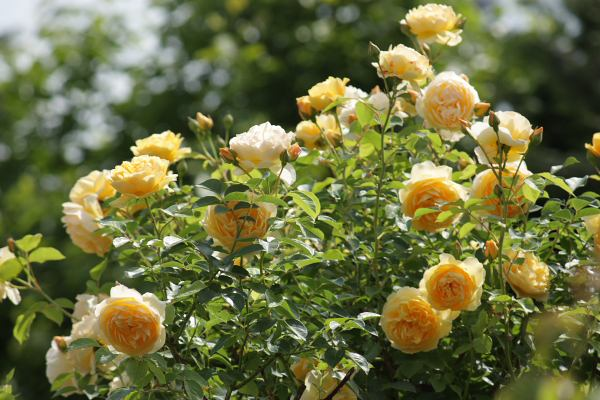
Roses in bloom at Ishida Rose Garden

An amateur rosarian, Ishida planted the yard of his house with various kind of roses. Two years after his death, his rose garden was donated to the City of Odate and named Ishida Rose Garden (石田ローズガーデン, Ishida Rōzu Gāden). It is since opened to the public every June.

== Honours ==
- Grand Cordon of the Order of the Rising Sun (1987)

Political offices
Preceded by Ryūtarō Nemoto	Chief Cabinet Secretary; 1956–1957	Succeeded by Kiichi Aichi
Preceded by Shutaro Matsuura	Minister of Labour; 1957–1958	Succeeded by Tadao Kuraishi
Preceded by Raizo Matsuno	Minister of Labour; 1960–1961	Succeeded by Kenji Fukunaga
Preceded by Takeo Ohashi	Minister of Labour; 1964–1965	Succeeded by Hisao Kodaira
Preceded by Mutsuo Kimura	Minister of Transport; 1976	Succeeded by Hajime Tamura
Preceded by Sachio Urano	Minister of Labour; 1976–1977	Succeeded by Katsushi Fujii
