= Pensions in Japan =

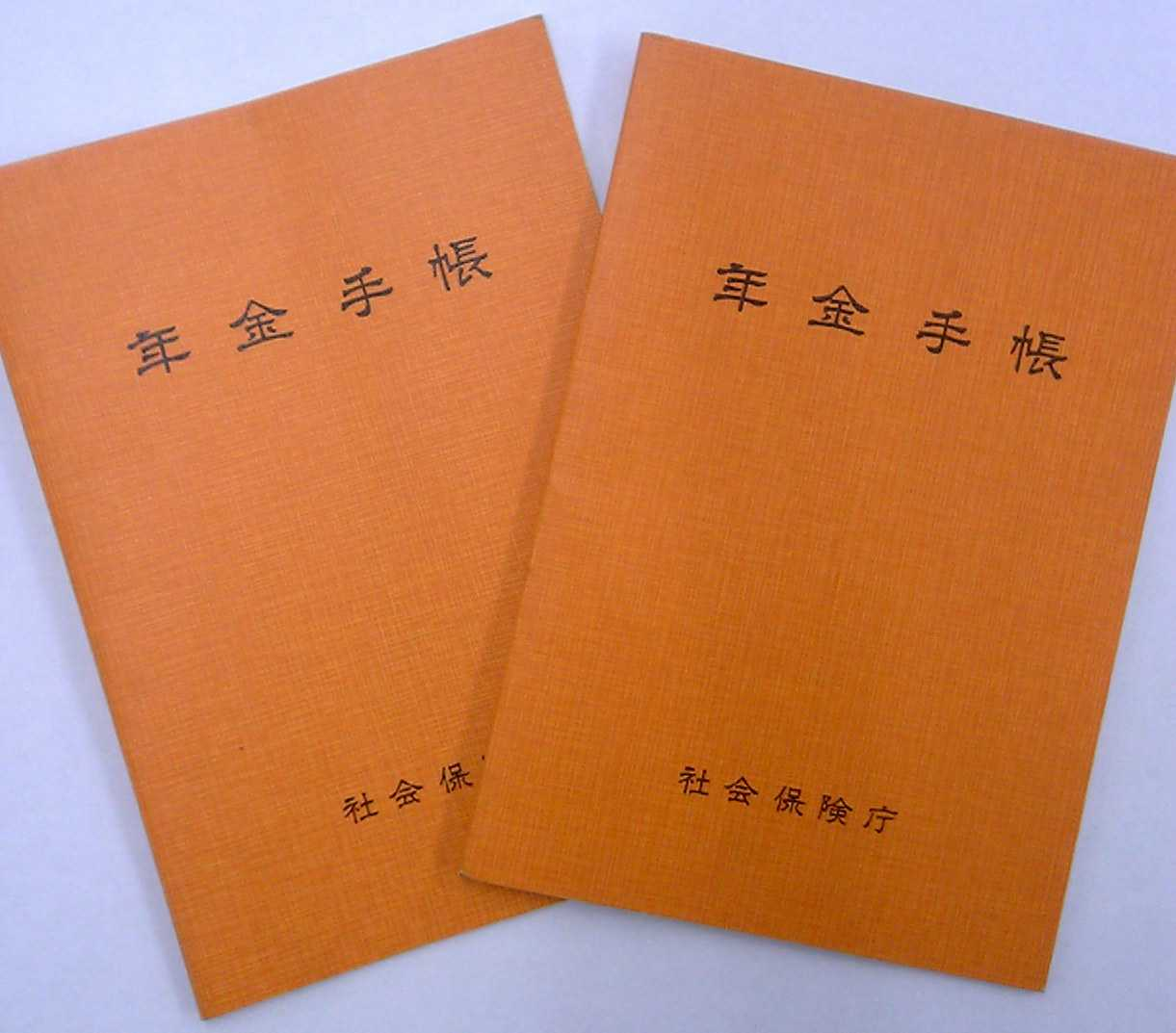
Pension notebooks issued by the Japan Pension Service.

Pensions in Japan comprise the National Pension system run by the government, and a series of voluntary private pension plans.

== National pension ==
The National Pension system, which is administered by the Japan Pension Service, is the state pension program, and all registered residents aged 20 to 59, both Japanese citizens and legal foreign residents, are obliged to contribute to it. Contributions are deducted from employee paychecks, while the self-employed pay a set amount. The size of a pension is determined by the amount of contributions paid into the system.

Non-Japanese who had short periods of National Pension coverage may withdraw a lump sum from the system.

The Japanese government maintains the Government Pension Investment Fund, which makes investments designed to ensure the stability of the system at minimal risk.

== Private pensions ==
Firms with 500 or more employees are covered by employee pension funds, and they may opt out of the National Pension system provided 50% higher benefits. Employee Pension Funds are independent legal entities from their companies, and are managed by a committee comprising an equal number of employer and employee representatives.
