= Kiichi Miyazawa =

Prime Minister of Japan from 1991 to 1993

- 宮澤 喜一
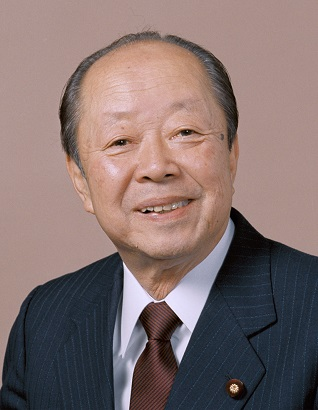
- Official portrait, 1991

Prime Minister of Japan
- In office 5 November 1991 – 9 August 1993
- Monarch: Akihito
- Deputy: Michio Watanabe; Masaharu Gotōda
- Preceded by: Toshiki Kaifu
- Succeeded by: Morihiro Hosokawa

President of the Liberal Democratic Party
- In office 31 October 1991 – 29 July 1993
- Vice President: Shin Kanemaru
- Secretary-General: Tamisuke Watanuki; Seiroku Kajiyama
- Preceded by: Toshiki Kaifu
- Succeeded by: Yōhei Kōno

Deputy Prime Minister of Japan
- In office 6 November 1987 – 9 December 1988
- Prime Minister: Noboru Takeshita
- Preceded by: Shin Kanemaru
- Succeeded by: Michio Watanabe (1991)
Ministerial offices
Minister of Finance
In office 30 July 1998 – 26 April 2001
Prime Minister	Keizo Obuchi; Yoshiro Mori
Preceded by	Hikaru Matsunaga
Succeeded by	Masajuro Shiokawa
In office 22 July 1986 – 9 December 1988
Prime Minister	Yasuhiro Nakasone; Noboru Takeshita
Preceded by	Noboru Takeshita
Succeeded by	Noboru Takeshita (acting); Tatsuo Murayama
Minister of Agriculture, Forestry and Fisheries
In office 4 August 1993 – 9 August 1993
Prime Minister	Himself
Preceded by	Masami Tanabu
Succeeded by	Eijiro Hata
Minister of Posts and Telecommunications
In office 20 July 1993 – 9 August 1993
Prime Minister	Himself
Preceded by	Junichiro Koizumi
Succeeded by	Takenori Kanzaki
Chief Cabinet Secretary
In office 17 July 1980 – 27 November 1982
Prime Minister	Zenko Suzuki
Preceded by	Masayoshi Ito
Succeeded by	Masaharu Gotōda
Director-General of the Economic Planning Agency
In office 27 November 1977 – 7 December 1978
Prime Minister	Takeo Fukuda
Preceded by	Tadashi Kuranari
Succeeded by	Tokusaburo Kosaka
In office 3 December 1966 – 30 November 1968
Prime Minister	Eisaku Satō
Preceded by	Aiichirō Fujiyama; Eisaku Satō (acting)
Succeeded by	Wataro Kanno
In office 18 July 1962 – 18 July 1964
Prime Minister	Hayato Ikeda
Preceded by	Aiichirō Fujiyama; Hayato Ikeda (acting)
Succeeded by	Mamoru Takahashi
Minister for Foreign Affairs
In office 9 December 1974 – 15 September 1976
Prime Minister	Takeo Miki
Preceded by	Toshio Kimura
Succeeded by	Zentaro Kosaka
Minister of International Trade and Industry
In office 14 January 1970 – 5 July 1971
Prime Minister	Eisaku Satō
Preceded by	Masayoshi Ohira
Succeeded by	Kakuei Tanaka

Member of the House of Representatives
- In office 29 January 1967 – 10 October 2003
- Constituency: Hiroshima 3rd (1967–1996); Hiroshima 7th (1996–2000); Chūgoku PR (2000–2003)

Member of the House of Councillors
- In office 3 May 1953 – 1 June 1965
- Preceded by: Tsunei Kusunose
- Succeeded by: Masaaki Fujita
- Constituency: Hiroshima at-large

Personal details
- Born: 8 October 1919 Tokyo, Empire of Japan
- Died: 28 June 2007 (aged 87) Shibuya, Tokyo, Japan
- Party: Liberal Democratic (after 1955)
- Other political affiliations: Liberal (1950–1955)
- Spouse: Yoko Ijichi (m. 1943)
- Children: 2
- Relatives: Hiroshi Miyazawa (brother); Yoichi Miyazawa (nephew)
- Education: Tokyo Imperial University
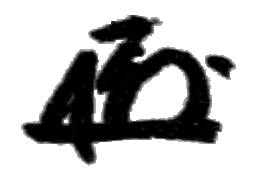
- Signature

Kiichi Miyazawa (宮澤 喜一, Miyazawa Kiichi; 8 October 1919 – 28 June 2007) was a Japanese politician who served as prime minister of Japan from 1991 to 1993.

Born in Tokyo, Miyazawa graduated from Tokyo Imperial University with a law degree, and in 1942 joined the Ministry of Finance. He was first elected to the National Diet in 1953 and held a number of prominent posts, including international trade and industry minister under Eisaku Sato, foreign minister under Takeo Miki, director of the Economic Planning Agency under Takeo Fukuda, chief cabinet secretary under Yasuhiro Nakasone, and finance minister under Noboru Takeshita. Miyazawa became prime minister in 1991, but was forced to resign after the 1993 election after a failure to pass political reforms caused his Liberal Democratic Party to face its first defeat in a national election since its formation in 1955. Miyazawa later returned as finance minister from 1999 to 2001 in the cabinets of Keizō Obuchi and Yoshirō Mori.

== Early life and education ==
Miyazawa was born into a wealthy, politically active family from Fukuyama, Hiroshima, on 8 October 1919, as the eldest son of politician Yutaka Miyazawa and his wife Koto. His father was a member of the Diet, and his mother was the daughter of politician Ogawa Heikichi, who served as Minister of Justice and Minister of Railways. Following the 1923 Great Kantō earthquake, Miyazawa lived at his grandfather Ogawa Heikichi's villa Kasuian in Hiratsuka. At the time, his father Yutaka worked for Yamashita Kisen, whilst planning to move his political career from Hiroshima Prefecture to the National Diet.

Miyazawa studied at Musashi Higher School, then went on to study at the Faculty of Law, Tokyo Imperial University. While at university, Miyazawa travelled to attend the Japan-America Student Conference in Washington D.C. in the United States in 1939, just before the outbreak of the Second World War. Inspired by this experience, he kept learning English even during the time the country was at war with the US, and became a fluent speaker. Apart from his studies, he was passionate about Noh, films and music.

== Career ==
In 1942, Miyazawa joined the Ministry of Finance, avoiding military service during World War II. While in the Ministry, he became a protégé of future prime minister Hayato Ikeda.

In 1953, at Ikeda's urging, Miyazawa ran for and won election to the Upper House of the National Diet, where he remained until moving to the Lower House in 1967. As a leading figure in Ikeda's Kōchikai policy group, Miyazawa was considered a member of Ikeda's "brains trust." In 1961, Miyazawa accompanied Ikeda to a summit meeting with U.S. President John F. Kennedy, and due to his excellent English, served as Ikeda's sole translator during the latter's "yacht talks" with Kennedy on Kennedy's presidential yacht, the Honey Fitz.

Beginning with the Ikeda cabinet, Miyazawa held a number of important government posts, including Director of the Economic Planning Agency (1962–64, 1966–68, 1977–78), Minister of International Trade and Industry (1970–1971), Minister of Foreign Affairs (1974–1976), and Chief Cabinet Secretary (1984–1986). He became Minister of Finance under the government of Noboru Takeshita in 1987. However, Miyazawa had to resign from this post amid the Recruit scandal in 1988.

== Premiership (1991–1993) ==
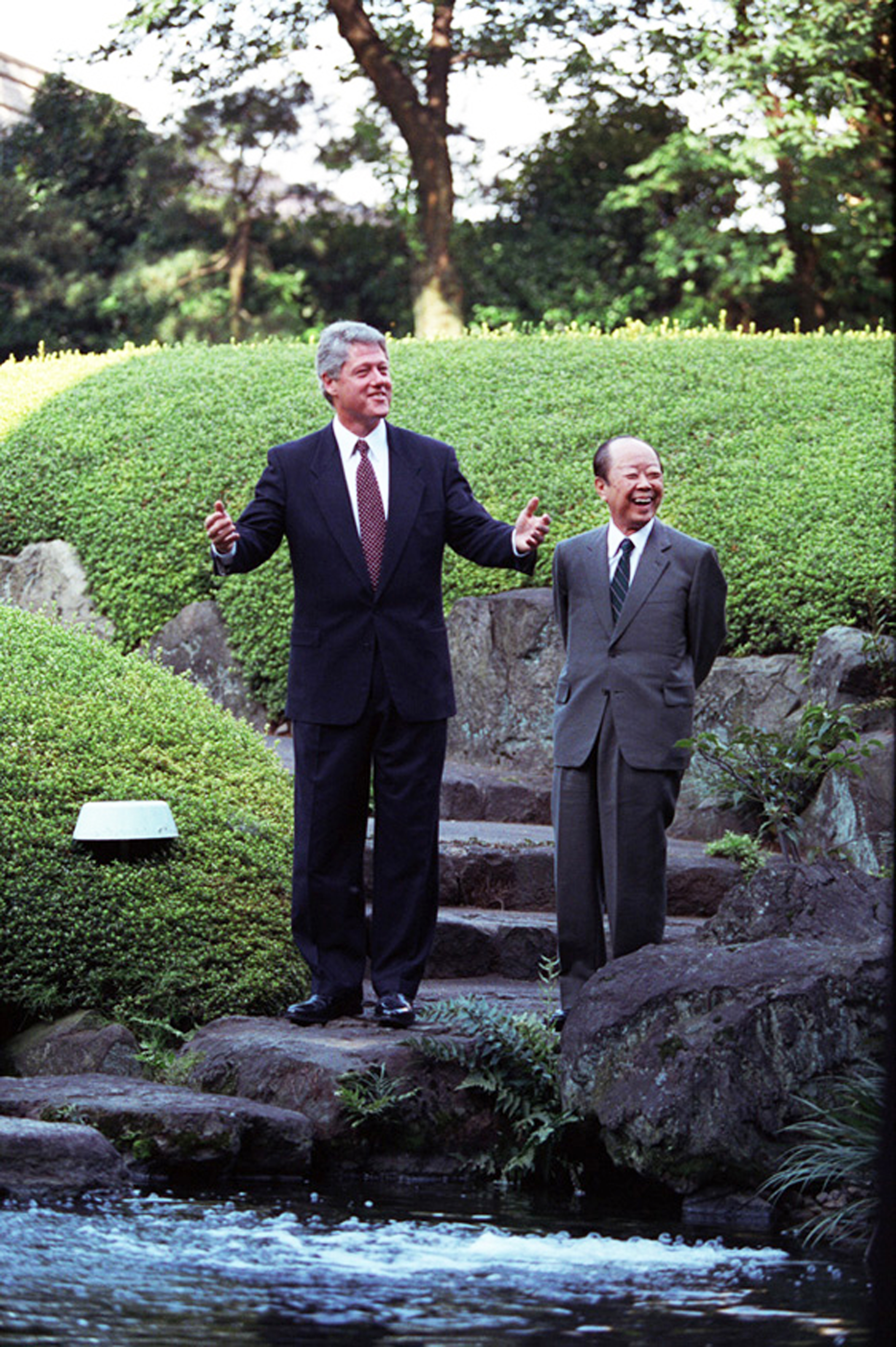
Miyazawa with Bill Clinton at the Garden of Iikura Guest House on 6 July 1993

Miyazawa became Prime Minister on 5 November 1991 backed by his faction. Miyazawa gained brief fame in the United States when President George H. W. Bush vomited in his lap and fainted during a state dinner on 8 January 1992.

In 1992, while he was in South Korea, he formally apologized for Japan's use of comfort women, making him the first Japanese leader to acknowledge that Japan's military coerced women into sexual slavery before and during the Second World War.

His government passed a law allowing Japan to send its forces overseas for peacekeeping missions as well as negotiating a trade agreement with the United States. It also introduced financial reforms to address the growing economic malaise in Japan in the 1990s. Miyazawa resigned in 1993 after losing a vote of no confidence marking an end to 38 years of Liberal Democratic Party government. The reason for the vote was a scandal involving Fumio Abe, a member of Miyazawa's faction. The Liberal Democratic Party returned to power in June 1994.

While he was a keynesian, he also adopted some free-market capitalist economic policies.

== Subsequent career ==
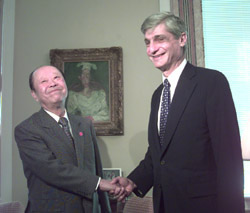
Miyazawa with Robert Rubin (on 26 April 1999)

Miyazawa later returned to frontbench politics when he was once again appointed finance minister from 1998 to 2001 in the governments of Keizō Obuchi and Yoshirō Mori. In 1998, Miyazawa replaced Hikaru Matsunaga as finance minister.

Without having any governmental office (which is remarkable), he held the speech for his country at the UN General Assembly on 11 November 2001.

He served a total of 14 terms in both upper and lower houses before retiring from politics in 2003. The reason for his retirement was that then prime minister Junichiro Koizumi set an age limit of 73 for LDP political candidates.

== Personal life ==
Miyazawa married while studying in the United States. He and his wife, Yoko, had two children: Hiro, an architect, and Keiko, who became wife of diplomat Christopher J. LaFleur. He published a book, entitled Secret Talks Between Tokyo and Washington, which was translated into English by Robert D. Eldridge in 2007. The book is about Miyazawa's views concerning the relationships between the US and Japan in terms of the political, economic, and security-related negotiations during the period of 1949 and 1954.

== Death ==
Miyazawa died in Tokyo at the age of 87 on 28 June 2007.

== Honour ==
- Grand Cross of the Order of the Sun of Peru (1992)

Party political offices
Preceded by Toshiki Kaifu	President of the Liberal Democratic Party; 1991–1993	Succeeded by Yōhei Kōno
Preceded by Zenkō Suzuki	Head of Kōchikai; 1986–1998	Succeeded by Kōichi Katō
Political offices
Preceded by Hayato Ikeda	Minister of State; Head of the Economic Planning Agency; 1962–1964	Succeeded by Mamoru Takahashi
Preceded by Eisaku Satō	Minister of State; Head of the Economic Planning Agency; 1966–1968	Succeeded by Wataro Kanno
Preceded by Masayoshi Ōhira	Minister of International Trade and Industry; 1970–1971	Succeeded by Kakuei Tanaka
Preceded by Toshio Kimura	Minister for Foreign Affairs; 1974–1976	Succeeded by Zentaro Kosaka
Preceded by Tadashi Kuranari	Minister of State; Head of the Economic Planning Agency; 1977–1978	Succeeded by Tokusaburo Kosaka
Preceded by Masayoshi Ito	Chief Cabinet Secretary; 1980–1982	Succeeded by Masaharu Gotōda
Preceded by Noboru Takeshita	Minister of Finance; 1986–1988	Succeeded by Noboru Takeshita
Preceded by Shin Kanemaru	Deputy Prime Minister of Japan; 1987–1988	Succeeded by Michio Watanabe
Preceded by Toshiki Kaifu	Prime Minister of Japan; 1991–1993	Succeeded by Morihiro Hosokawa
Preceded by Junichiro Koizumi	Minister of Posts and Telecommunications; 1993	Succeeded by Takenori Kanzaki
Preceded by Masami Tanabu	Minister of Agriculture, Forestry and Fisheries; 1993	Succeeded by Eijirō Hata
Preceded by Hikaru Matsunaga	Minister of Finance; 1998–2001	Succeeded by Masajuro Shiokawa
Diplomatic posts
Preceded by Helmut Kohl	Chairperson of the G7; 1993	Succeeded by Silvio Berlusconi
Honorary titles
Preceded by Takenori Katō	Youngest member of the House of Councillors of Japan; 1953–1956	Succeeded by Tadashi Ōya
