= Ministry of Construction (Japan) =

Ministry of Construction (建設省, Kensetsu-shō; MOC) was a government ministry of Japan headquartered in Kasumigaseki, Chiyoda, Tokyo.

In 2001 it merged into the Ministry of Land, Infrastructure, Transport and Tourism.
