= Ministry of Transport (Japan) =

Former ministry of the Japanese government

Ministry of Transport (運輸省, Un'yu-shō) was a ministry of the Japanese government.

It managed 849 public corporations before its 2001 merger. It merged into the Ministry of Land, Infrastructure, Transport and Tourism (MLIT) in January 2001.
