= Koizumi =

Koizumi (小泉; "small fountain", 古泉 "old fountain") is a Japanese family name.

It may describe one of several Koizumi railway stations.

It can refer to a number of people, including the following members of the prominent Koizumi family:

- Junichiro Koizumi (小泉 純一郎; born 1942), former prime minister of Japan
- Junya Koizumi (小泉 純也; 1904–1969), a second-generation Diet member and the father of Junichiro Koizumi
- Koizumi Matajirō (小泉 又次郎; 1865–1951), Japanese politician and the father-in-law of Junya Koizumi
- Kotaro Koizumi (小泉 孝太郎; born 1978), an aspiring actor and the first son of Junichiro Koizumi
- Shinjirō Koizumi (小泉 進次郎; born 1981), a fourth-generation Diet member and the second son of Junichiro Koizumi

== Other individuals ==
- Ariane Koizumi, American fashion model and actress
- Chikashi Koizumi (古泉 千樫; 1886–1927), Japanese poet
- Eiko Koizumi (小泉 栄子; born 1973), a Japanese beach volleyball player
- Gunji Koizumi (小泉 軍治; 1885–1965), the founder of British Judo
- Hiroshi Koizumi (racing driver) (小泉 洋史; born 1969), Japanese racing driver
- Kei Koizumi (小泉 慶; born 1995), Japanese footballer
- Kyōko Koizumi (小泉 今日子; born 1966), singer and actress
- Miyuki Koizumi (小泉 深雪; born 1979), Japanese model
- Takashi Koizumi (小泉 堯史; born 1944), film director
- Patrick Lafcadio Hearn or Yakumo Koizumi (小泉 八雲; 1850–1904), Irish-Greek-Japanese author
- Koizumi Setsuko (小泉節子, 1868–1932), wife of Lafcadio Hearn
- Yoshiaki Koizumi (小泉 歓晃; born 1968), video game designer
- Yoshio Koizumi (小泉 佳穂; born 1996), Japanese footballer

== Fictional characters ==
- Koizumi, character in Ms. Koizumi Loves Ramen Noodles
- Akako Koizumi, character in Magic Kaito
- Asami Koizumi from the Young Justice animated series
- Itsuki Koizumi (古泉 一樹), character in Haruhi Suzumiya series
- Mika Koizumi, character in Choudenshi Bioman
- Risa Koizumi, the protagonist of Love Com
- Several characters in Guru Guru Pon-chan, Ponta, Yuki, Soichiro, and Ji Koizumi
- Mahiru Koizumi, a character in Danganronpa 2: Goodbye Despair
- Hanayo Koizumi, a character from [Love Live!]
- Natsumi Koizumi, a character from School Days
- Yoshiko Koizumi, a main character girl from Little Ghost Q-Taro

== See also ==
- Gen-ichi Koidzumi (小泉 源一; 1883–1953), botanist whose standard abbreviation in botanical works is Koidz.
