= Kanagawa 2nd district (1920–1924) =

Legislative district of Japan

Kanagawa 2nd district was a constituency of the House of Representatives in the Imperial Diet of Japan (national legislature) in the elections of 1920 and 1924. It was located in Kanagawa prefecture and consisted of Yokosuka city. Its only representative was Koizumi Matajirō who later went on to become Minister of Communication in the 2nd Wakatsuki cabinet. Koizumi, his son-in-law Jun'ya, his grandson Jun'ichirō and his great-grandson Shinjirō have continued to represent Yokosuka in the House of Representatives with only short interruptions to the day.

In previous elections Yokosuka (that had only been promoted from town in Miura county to city in 1907) had formed part of the gun-bu electoral district alongside all counties (gun) of Kanagawa, the only city (shi) originally being Yokohama that formed a separate electoral district on its own. With the introduction of universal (male) suffrage and the return to widespread use of single non-transferable vote (SNTV) in 1925, Yokosuka became part of the new 2nd district that included much of eastern Kanagawa and elected four representatives by SNTV.

== Election results ==
1920
Party	Candidate	Votes	%	±%
Kenseikai	Koizumi Matajirō	1,161		
Rikken Seiyūkai	Kawashima Kinosuke (?)	556		
Kenseikai	Suzuki Fukumatsu (?)	306		
	Other candidates	2		

1924
Party	Candidate	Votes	%	±%
Kenseikai	Koizumi Matajirō	1,777		
	Sawano Tamiji	1,205		
	Other candidates	4		
