= Kotaro Koizumi =

Japanese actor

- 小泉孝太郎
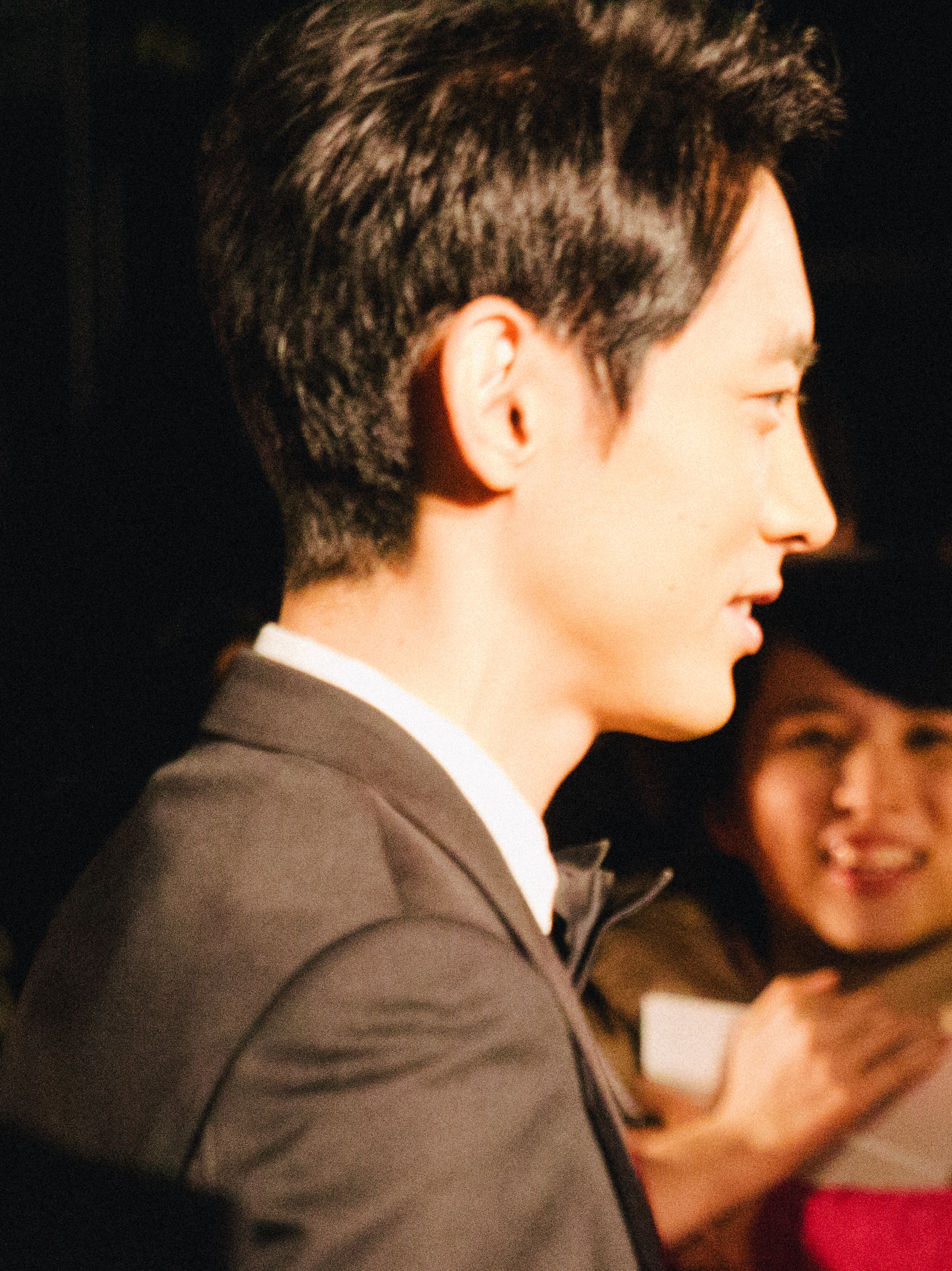
- Koizumi in 2014
- Born: July 10, 1978 (age 48); Yokosuka, Kanagawa, Japan
- Occupation: Actor
- Years active: 2001–present
- Parent(s): Junichiro Koizumi; Kayoko Miyamoto
- Relatives: Shinjirō Koizumi (brother); Jun'ya Koizumi (grandfather); Yoshie Koizumi (grandmother); Koizumi Matajirō (great-grandfather)

Kotaro Koizumi (小泉 孝太郎, Koizumi Kōtarō; born July 10, 1978) is a Japanese actor and the eldest son of the 56th Japanese Prime Minister, Junichiro Koizumi, and Kayoko Miyamoto, he is the older brother of Japanese Defense Minister Shinjirou Koizumi.

Born in Yokosuka, Kanagawa, he studied economics at night classes of Nihon University, but dropped out.

== Filmography ==
=== Television ===
- Who Wants to Be a Millionaire?, won the maximum ten million yen on a celebrity special
- Ninomiya Kotaro (Fuji, July 2024) (co-starring with Kazunari Ninomiya)

=== TV dramas ===
- Nurseman (2002)
- Hatsu Taiken (2002)
- Shiawase No Shippo (2002)
- Kurutta Kajitsu 2002 (2002)
- Home & Away (2002)
- Boku dake no Madonna (2003)
- Korogashi Ogin (2003)
- Igi Ari, Onna Bengoshi Oka Norie (2004)
- Division 1 \"Pink Hip Girl\" (Fuji TV, 2004)
- Yoshitsune (2005), Taira no Sukemori
- Slow Dance (2005)
- Tokyo Wonder Tours (2005)
- Gachi Baka (2006)
- Attention Please (2006)
- Fushin no Toki (2006)
- The Pride of the Temp (2007)
- Attention Please SP (2007)
- Hanayome to Papa (2007)
- Otoko no Kosodate (2007)
- Gokusen 3 (2008)
- Yae's Sakura (2013), Tokugawa Yoshinobu
- Age Harassment (2015)
- Akira and Akira (2017)
- Black Pean (2018), Takashina Gonta
- The Good Wife (2019)
- The 13 Lords of the Shogun (2022), Taira no Munemori
- Fixer (2023), Kōji Itakura
- Black Pean Season 2 (2024), Takashina Gonta
- Passing the Reins (2025), Yutaro Sanno

=== Films ===
- Bayside Shakedown 2 (2003), Shigeru Koike
- Koshonin Mashita Masayoshi (2005), Shigeru Koike
- Kamen Rider Hibiki & The Seven Fighting Demons (2005), Takeshi
- Udon (2006), Udon shop customers
- Bayside Shakedown 3 (2010), Shigeru Koike
- Whistleblower (2019), Shōhei Nagura
- You're Not Normal, Either (2021), Miyamoto
- The Hound of the Baskervilles: Sherlock the Movie (2022), Haruto Sutei
- Oshorin (2023)
- Rude to Love (2024), Mamoru
- Hoshi no Kyoshitsu (2026)

== Other Activity ==
On May 7, 2026, it was revealed that Koizumi was chosen, together with Kaori Sakamoto and Hey! Say! JUMP's Ryosuke Yamada, as ambassador for the NTV yearly SDGs campaign "Good for the Planet Week".

== Ancestry ==
Ancestors of Kotaro Koizumi

8. Samejima Yazaemon
4. Jun'ya Koizumi
2. Junichirō Koizumi
10. Koizumi Matajirō
5. Yoshie Koizumi
11. Ishikawa Katsu
1. Kotaro Koizumi
3. Kayoko Miyamoto
