= Koizumi family =

Political family in Japan

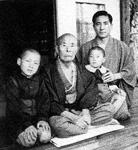
A portrait of the men of the Koizumi family in the 1940s or early 1950s. Junichirō is at left and Matajirō is in center; Jun'ya is holding his son Masaya at right.

The Koizumi family has been prominent in Japanese politics since the early 1900s. Notable members of this family include:

- Matajirō Koizumi (1865–1951) – Minister of Posts and Telecommunications, he was known as the "wild man" and "tattoo minister" because of a large dragon Irezumi tattoo on his back. While many other politicians of his era descended from the samurai class, Matajirō's father Yoshibe Koizumi was a scaffolder and commoner.
  - Jun'ya Koizumi (1904–1969) – Son-in-law of Matajirō. Served as Director General of the Japanese Defense Agency.
    - Tetsugoro Iryo (1924/25–1945) – nephew of Jun'ya and cousin of Junichirō Koizumi, died a kamikaze pilot.
    - Junichirō Koizumi (born 1942) – son of Jun'ya and grandson of Matajirō. Former Prime Minister of Japan.
    - Kayoko Miyamoto (born 1956) – ex-wife of Junichirō Koizumi.
      - Kotaro Koizumi (born 1978) – actor, eldest son of Junichirō.
      - Shinjirō Koizumi (born 1981) – politician, Minister of Defense, second son of Junichirō.
      - Yoshinaga Miyamoto (born 1983) – third son of Junichirō, has never met his father until he reached adulthood.
