= Raizo Matsuno =

Japanese politician

- 松野 頼三
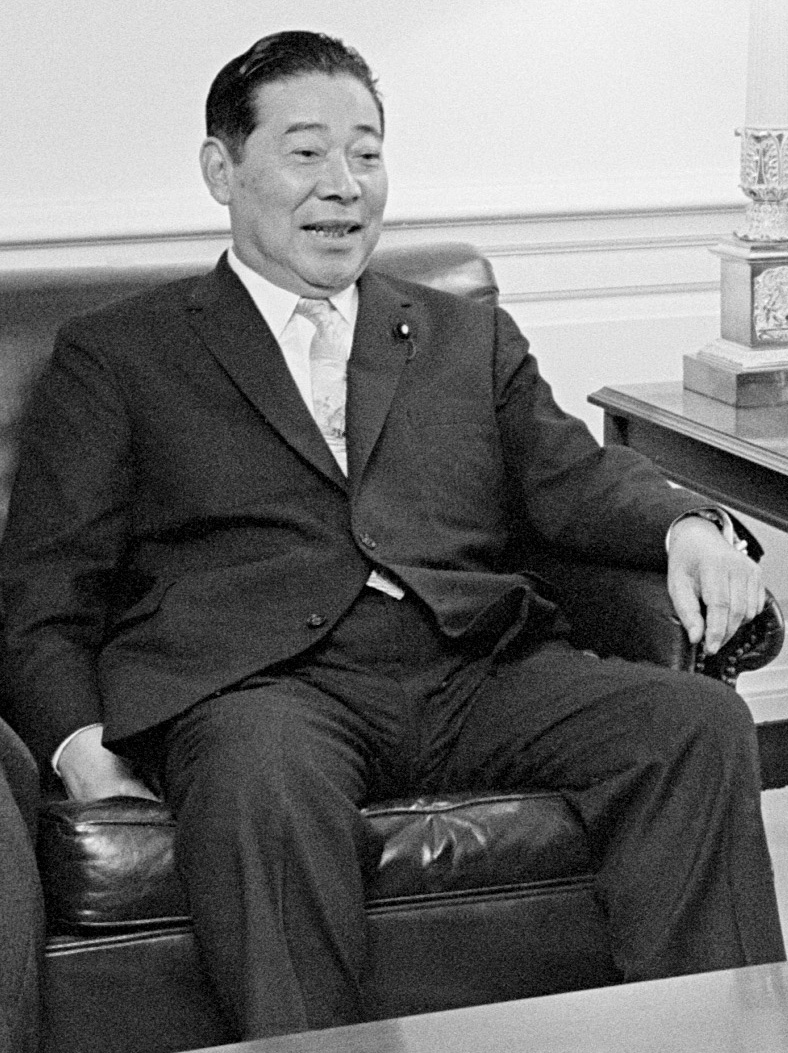

Minister of Agriculture and Forestry
- In office 1 August 1966 – 3 December 1966
- Prime Minister: Eisaku Satō
- Preceded by: Eiichi Sakata
- Succeeded by: Tadao Kuraishi

Director-General of the Japan Defense Agency
- In office 3 June 1965 – 1 August 1966
- Prime Minister: Eisaku Satō
- Preceded by: Jun'ya Koizumi
- Succeeded by: Eikichi Kanbayashiyama

Minister of Labour
- In office 18 June 1959 – 19 July 1960
- Prime Minister: Nobusuke Kishi
- Preceded by: Tadao Kuraishi
- Succeeded by: Hirohide Ishida

Director-General for the Prime Minister's Office
- In office 12 June 1958 – 18 June 1959
- Prime Minister: Nobusuke Kishi
- Preceded by: Jirō Imamatsu
- Succeeded by: Fukuda Tokuyasu

Member of the House of Representatives
- In office 23 June 1980 – 24 January 1990
- Preceded by: Eijirō Seno
- Succeeded by: Toshikatsu Matsuoka
- Constituency: Kumamoto 1st
- In office 26 April 1947 – 25 July 1979
- Preceded by: Constituency established
- Succeeded by: Hiroshi Kitaguchi
- Constituency: Kumamoto 1st

Personal details
- Born: 17 February 1917 Yamaga, Kumamoto, Japan
- Died: 10 May 2006 (aged 89) Minato, Tokyo, Japan
- Party: Liberal Democratic
- Other political affiliations: JLP (1947–1948); DLP (1948–1950); LP (1950–1955)
- Children: Yorihisa Matsuno
- Parent: Tsuruhei Matsuno (father)
- Relatives: Noda Utarō (grandfather)
- Education: Keio University

Military service
- Allegiance: Empire of Japan
- Branch/service: Imperial Japanese Navy
- Years of service: 1940–1945
- Rank: Lieutenant-Commander

Raizo Matsuno (松野 頼三, Matsuno Raizō; 12 February 1917 – 10 May 2006) was a Japanese politician. Born in Yamaga, Kumamoto, Kumamoto Prefecture in 1917, Matsuno served in the Imperial Japanese Navy as an officer at the end of World War II as he was attending Naval Accounting School.

He successively held numerous offices in post-war Japan:

- Director-General for the Prime Minister's Office from 1958 to 1959 under Nobusuke Kishi
- Minister of Labor from 1959 to 1960 under Nobusuke Kishi
- Director General of the Japan Defense Agency from 1965 to 1966 under Eisaku Satō
- Minister of Agriculture, Forestry and Fisheries 1966 under Eisaku Satō

He was Chairman of the Policy Affairs Research Council at Liberal Democratic Party, Chairman of the Executive Council.
