= Christel Takigawa =

French-Japanese news presenter

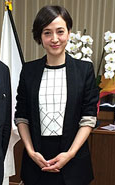
- Takigawa in 2015
- Born: Masami Christel Takigawa Lardeux; 1 October 1977 (age 48); Paris, France
- Other name: Masami Christel Koizumi (after marriage)
- Citizenship: France (1977–1985); Japan (since 1985)
- Occupation: News presenter
- Political party: Liberal Democratic
- Spouse: Shinjirō Koizumi (m. 2019)
- Children: 2

Christel Koizumi (小泉 クリステル, Kurisuteru Koizumi; née Takigawa; born 1 October 1977) is a French-Japanese television announcer and news presenter. She is married to Japanese politician Shinjirō Koizumi.

== Biography ==
Masami Christel Takigawa Lardeux was born in Paris, France, to a Japanese mother and a French father. Her family moved to Japan when she was three years old. After graduating from Tokyo Metropolitan Aoyama High School, she attended the College of Literature in Aoyama Gakuin University.

She has worked for Kyodo Television since graduating from university and began her career as a TV announcer initially using her Japanese name, Masami Takigawa. She later changed to her current name, Christel Takigawa. Although she works for Kyodo Television, she appears exclusively on Fuji Television programs.

Takigawa appeared as a newscaster on the Japanese news TV programme FNN News Japan between 2002 and September 2009 and appeared on Shin Hōdō Premier A, between April 2007 and June 2008.

Takigawa gave a presentation to the International Olympic Committee (IOC) in Buenos Aires in 2013, in English and in French, inviting the IOC to hold the Summer Olympic Games in Tokyo.

Takigawa announced on 7 August 2019, that she had married Shinjirō Koizumi, the second son of former Prime Minister Junichirō Koizumi. She gave birth to a son on 17 January 2020. She gave birth to a daughter on 20 November 2023.

== Awards and decorations ==
- Chevaliers of the Ordre des Arts et des Lettres (France, 17 January 2013)
- Chevaliers of the Ordre national du Mérite (France, December 2018)
