= Shinjirō Koizumi =

Japanese politician (born 1981)

- 小泉 進次郎
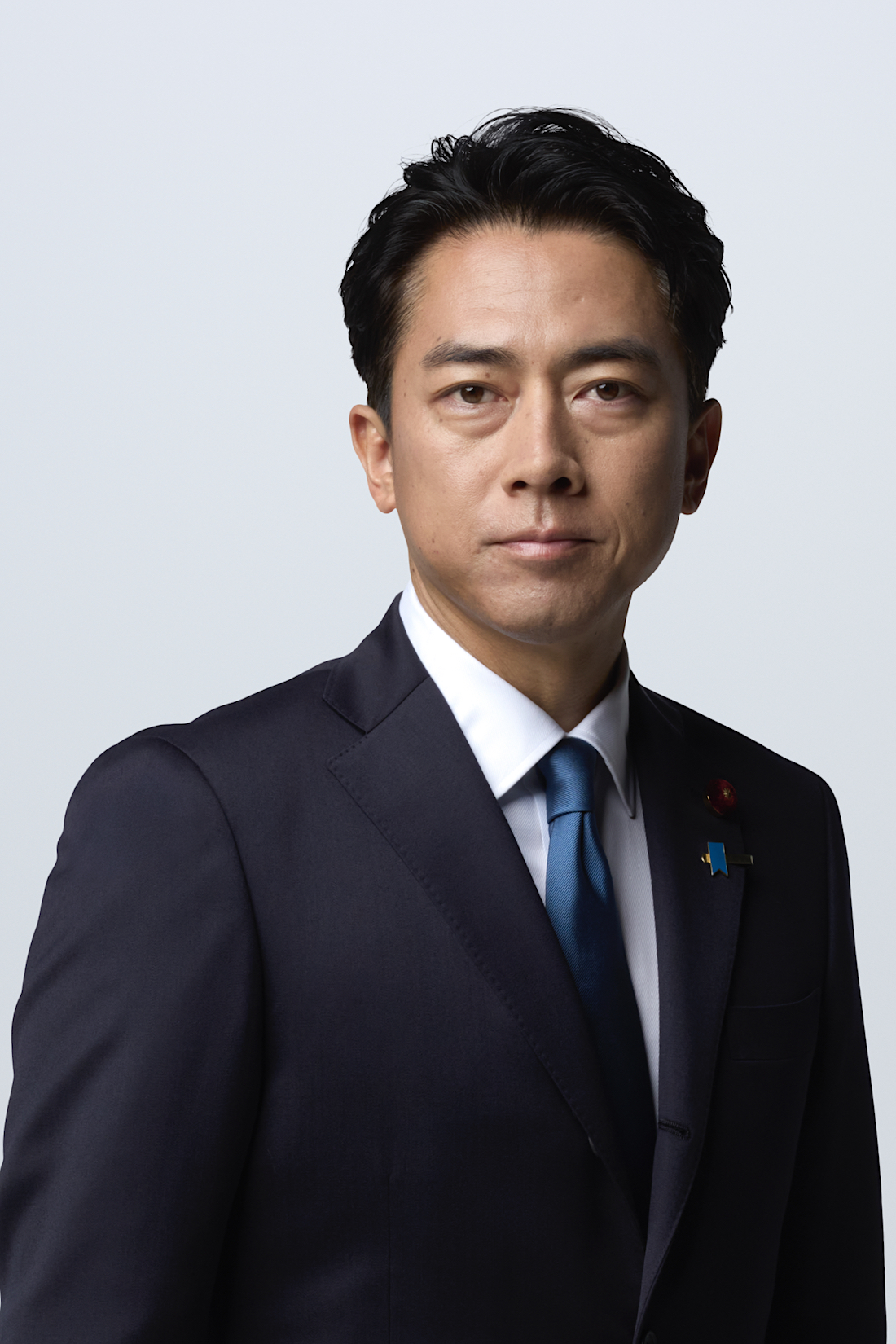
- Official portrait, 2025

Minister of Defense
- Incumbent
- Assumed office 21 October 2025
- Prime Minister: Sanae Takaichi
- Preceded by: Gen Nakatani

Minister of Agriculture, Forestry and Fisheries
- In office 21 May 2025 – 21 October 2025
- Prime Minister: Shigeru Ishiba
- Preceded by: Taku Etō
- Succeeded by: Norikazu Suzuki

Minister of the Environment
- In office 11 September 2019 – 4 October 2021
- Prime Minister: Shinzō Abe; Yoshihide Suga
- Preceded by: Yoshiaki Harada
- Succeeded by: Tsuyoshi Yamaguchi

Member of the House of Representatives; for Kanagawa's 11th district
- Incumbent
- Assumed office 31 August 2009
- Preceded by: Junichiro Koizumi

Personal details
- Born: 14 April 1981 (age 45) Yokosuka, Kanagawa, Japan
- Party: Liberal Democratic
- Spouse: Christel Takigawa (m. 2019)
- Children: 2
- Parent(s): Junichiro Koizumi (father); Kayoko Miyamoto (mother)
- Relatives: Koizumi family
- Education: Kanto Gakuin University (BEc); Columbia University (MA)

Shinjirō Koizumi (Japanese: 小泉 進次郎, Hepburn: Koizumi Shinjirō; born 14 April 1981) is a Japanese politician serving as the Minister of Defense since October 2025. He previously served as the Minister of the Environment from September 2019 to October 2021 and Minister of Agriculture, Forestry and Fisheries from May to October 2025. He has also served as a Member of the House of Representatives for the Liberal Democratic Party (LDP), representing Kanagawa since 2009. He is the second son of former Prime Minister Junichiro Koizumi and the younger brother of actor Kotaro Koizumi.

After graduating from Kanto Gakuin University and Columbia University, Koizumi worked as a researcher at the Center for Strategic and International Studies and became active politically as Young Leader of the Pacific Forum CSIS. He also spent time working as a political secretary for his father in the final years of his second term as prime minister. In the 2009 election, he was elected to the House of Representatives for the seat his father had occupied for more than 35 years.

Koizumi was appointed as a Vice-Minister for Reconstruction after the election of Prime Minister Shinzo Abe in 2012, focusing on the northeastern region of Japan that was devastated by the March 2011 tsunami and subsequent nuclear disaster. He publicly opposed his father's calls for Japan to abandon nuclear energy immediately. In 2019, Abe appointed Koizumi to the cabinet as Minister of the Environment, a role he retained when Yoshihide Suga succeeded Abe as prime minister in September 2020. Koizumi endorsed Taro Kono in the 2021 LDP leadership election, which resulted in Fumio Kishida becoming prime minister. He subsequently left the cabinet and returned to backbench politics.

Koizumi ran as a candidate in the 2024 LDP presidential election to succeed Kishida and placed third, losing the first round to Sanae Takaichi and Shigeru Ishiba, with the latter leading the final runoff. The LDP would lose its majority in the 2024 general election, after which Koizumi resigned as head of the party's Election Strategy committee. After working at the LDP's political reform headquarters, he was made Minister of Agriculture by Ishiba in May 2025. Following Ishiba's announcement of his resignation, Koizumi again ran as a candidate in the 2025 LDP presidential election, this time losing to Takaichi in the runoff. Takaichi subsequently appointed Koizumi as Minister of Defense.

== Early life ==
Koizumi is a fourth-generation politician of the Koizumi family. His father, Junichiro Koizumi, was the Prime Minister of Japan from 2001 to 2006. His grandfather, Jun'ya Koizumi, was director general of the Japan Defense Agency (now Minister of Defense) and a member of the House of Representatives representing Kanagawa's 2nd District, a seat that Junichiro also held. His great-grandfather, Matajirō Koizumi, was Minister of Communications, mayor of Yokosuka and a member of the House of Peers.

Koizumi's parents divorced when he was a toddler. His father gained full custody of him and his elder brother Kōtarō. They were raised by one of Junichiro's sisters, Michiko. At that time joint custody was not permitted in Japan. After the divorce, Shinjirō was estranged from his mother, Kayoko, and did not meet her or his younger brother Yoshinaga again until he reached adulthood. Yoshinaga had not yet been born when their parents divorced, and was kept under the sole custody of Kayoko throughout his entire childhood.

Koizumi was born and raised in Yokosuka, his father's home district. When he was a student in junior high and senior high schools, he was engrossed in playing sports, especially baseball. He attended Kanto Gakuin University in Yokohama, receiving a Bachelor of Economics degree in 2004. He received his master's degree in political science from Columbia University. He spent one year as a part-time research fellow at the Center for Strategic and International Studies and as Young Leader of the Pacific Forum CSIS before returning to Japan in 2007.

== Political career ==
=== Member of the House of Representatives ===
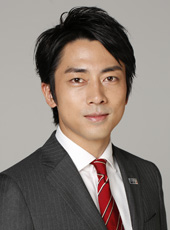
Official portrait, 2012

Following his father's announced retirement in 2008, he was elected to his father's former seat representing the Kanagawa 11th district in the August 2009 general election, in which many other LDP seats were lost to the Democratic Party of Japan. He faced criticism for being a hereditary politician. He campaigned in a rented Toyota Prius with a volunteer staff.

Koizumi became head of the LDP's young legislators caucus in October 2011, a post previously held by Prime Ministers Takeshita, Uno, Kaifu, Abe and Asō. In February 2012, he started a project called "Team 11," which sent members of the division to areas of the Tōhoku region affected by the 2011 Tōhoku earthquake and tsunami on the 11th of each month to talk to locals and report back on the state of the reconstruction efforts. The group had 82 members, all under the age of 45, as of March 2013. Some observers compared the group to the powerful "Machimura faction" led by Nobutaka Machimura in terms of its political weight.

He was critical of the LDP under party president Sadakazu Tanigaki. In his first meeting as a party officer, he stated that "the image of the party is that it doesn't listen to the opinions of young people, has old thoughts and a hard head. That is why trust will not be restored." He argued in a November 2011 speech that the party's stance on the controversial Trans-Pacific Partnership trade agreement needed to be clarified. He later advocated breaking up the LDP's agreement with the Democratic Party of Japan and Komeito to pass an overhaul of the social security and tax system, directly arguing to Tanigaki that the party's mission should be to take down the DPJ government and to restore LDP control, and drawing comparisons to his father's maverick reputation.

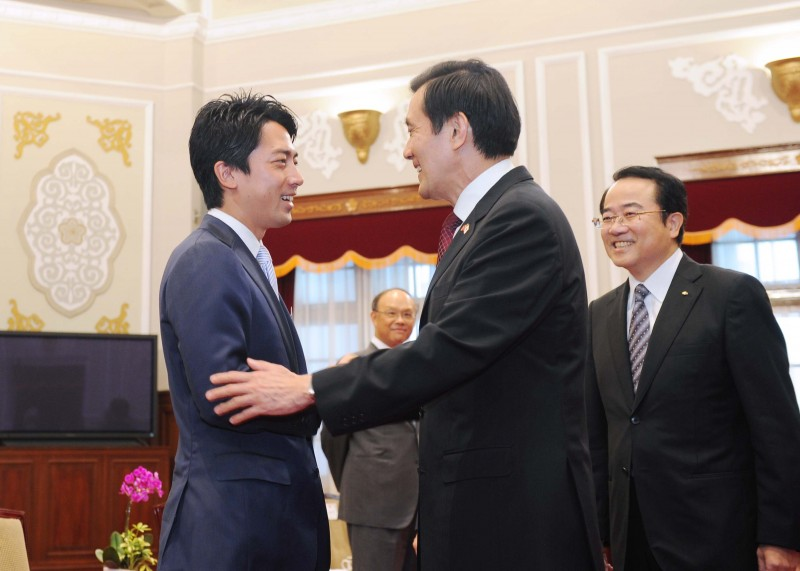
Koizumi meeting with President Ma Ying-jeou during his 2013 visit to Taiwan

Koizumi broke ranks with the LDP in August 2012 as one of seven LDP legislators who refused to walk out of the no-confidence vote instigated by Ichiro Ozawa against Prime Minister Yoshihiko Noda, in which the LDP and NK had agreed to throw out their votes. Although Koizumi voted for the no-confidence resolution, it was ultimately voted down 246–86. He voted for Shigeru Ishiba against Shinzō Abe in the LDP leadership election of September 2012, but did not make his vote public until after the election in order to avoid influencing others' votes.

Koizumi was re-elected in the December 2012 general election, which restored LDP control of the government under Abe. In the subsequent House of Councillors election in July 2013, he focused his campaigning efforts on disaster zones, outlying islands and areas in rapid population decline, giving speeches in support of their local LDP candidates. Kenichi Tokoi, a nonfiction author who wrote a book about Koizumi, said that his goal was to shake as many individual hands as possible and to leave the impression that he was kind enough to visit them, something which he could not achieve by campaigning in big cities. He led a delegation of the LDP's Youth Division during a trip to Taiwan in September 2013, meeting with President Ma Ying-jeou.

In October 2013, he was appointed Parliamentary Secretary in charge of Tohoku Recovery, in which capacity he would oversee post-disaster reconstruction efforts in Iwate Prefecture and Miyagi Prefecture. Ishiba, then secretary general of the LDP, stated that Koizumi "made a very strong case" with local disaster victims "about what he wanted to do and why." Tokoi characterized this posting as a test of Koizumi's administrative ability. Koizumi was re-elected for a third term in his Kanagawa 11th constituency in the 2014 general election.

=== Minister of Environment (2019–2021) ===
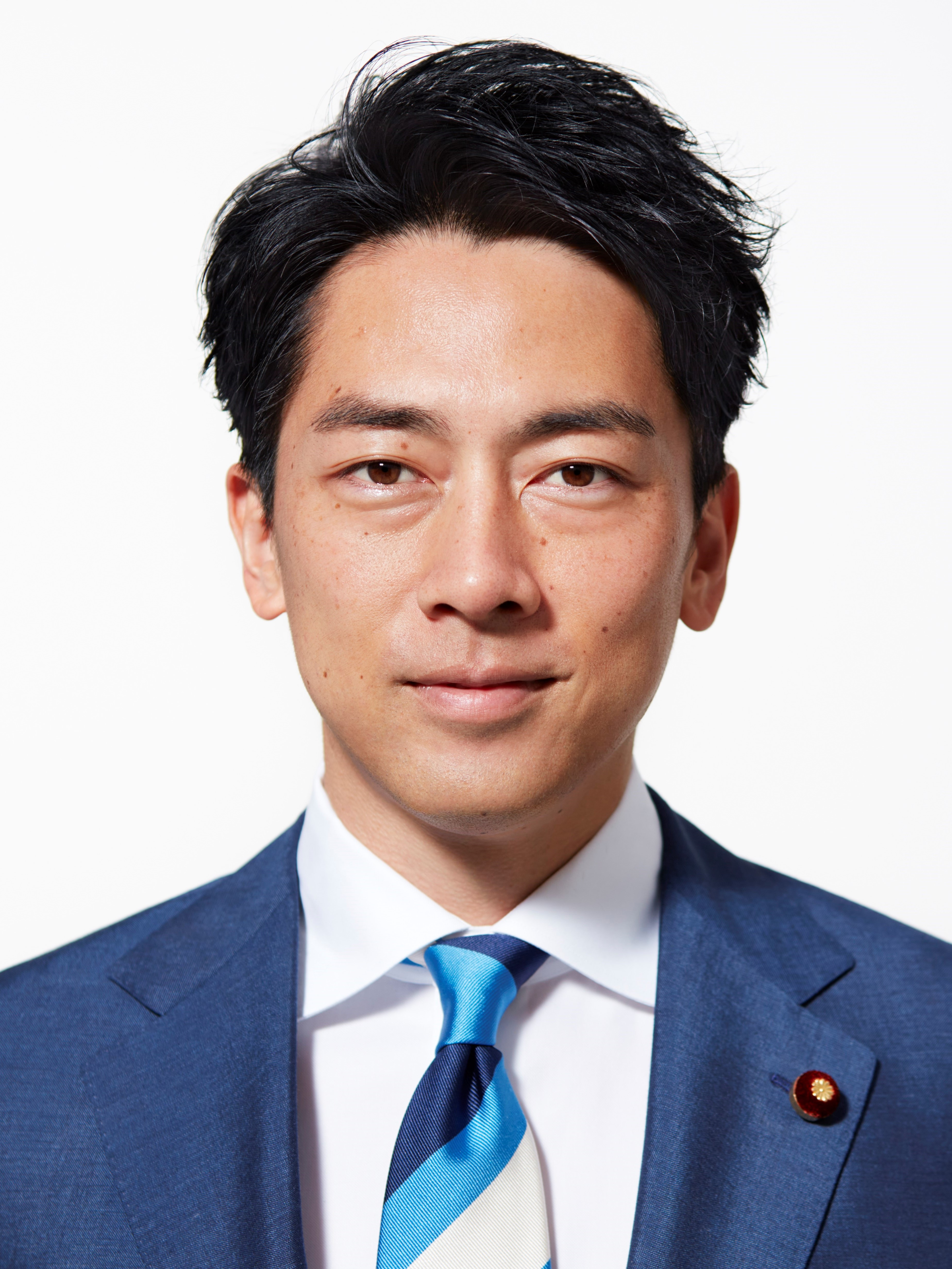
Official portrait, 2020

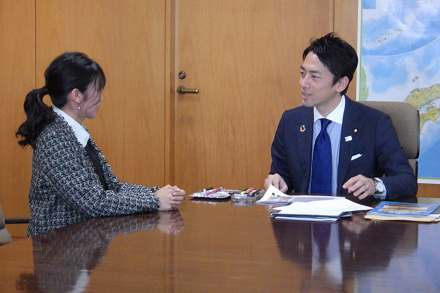
Koizumi with Ko Shibasaki in 2019.

Koizumi was reportedly considered for a formal cabinet post under the Abe government in the reshuffles of October 2015 and July 2017. In October 2017, Koizumi was re-elected for a fourth time in the 2017 general election. On 11 September 2019, Prime Minister Abe appointed Koizumi as Minister of the Environment. He advocated for environmentalist policies, including ending Japan's use of nuclear and coal power, despite serving in a government considered skeptical of such policies.

However, he supports the construction of new coal-fired power stations in Japan, despite their particulate and greenhouse gas emissions. His support for the construction of two coal-fired power stations in Yokosuka has led him to be a "a target of activists' wrath".

In late August 2020, after the resignation of Shinzo Abe, Koizumi was named as a possible successor. A Kyodo News survey showed that almost 9% of those surveyed preferred him for prime minister, though some inside the party consider him too young to be in charge of the country. Koizumi declined to run and endorsed Minister of Defense Tarō Kōno for the position. After Kōno also declined to run Koizumi and Kono both endorsed Chief Cabinet Secretary Yoshihide Suga, a fellow Kanagawa politician. Suga ultimately won the LDP presidential election and became prime minister. Suga decided to retain Koizumi in his role. Poor approval ratings and criticism of the government's handling of the COVID-19 pandemic led to Suga announcing his resignation in September 2021. In the party's leadership election of 2021 (which ended with Fumio Kishida being elected as leader and later prime minister), Koizumi again endorsed Kōno for the position. When Kishida formed his first cabinet in October, Koizumi was replaced by Tsuyoshi Yamaguchi as Environment Minister.

From 2021 to 2024, Koizumi remained a backbencher in the Diet. Koizumi was returned to his seat in the House of Representatives for a fifth consecutive term during the 2021 general election, securing nearly 80% of the vote in his Kanagawa 11th district. He was chosen to chair the standing committee on national security in the House of Representatives in January 2024 after the previous chairman resigned in connection to the 2023–2024 Japanese slush fund scandal.

=== 2024 LDP leadership election ===
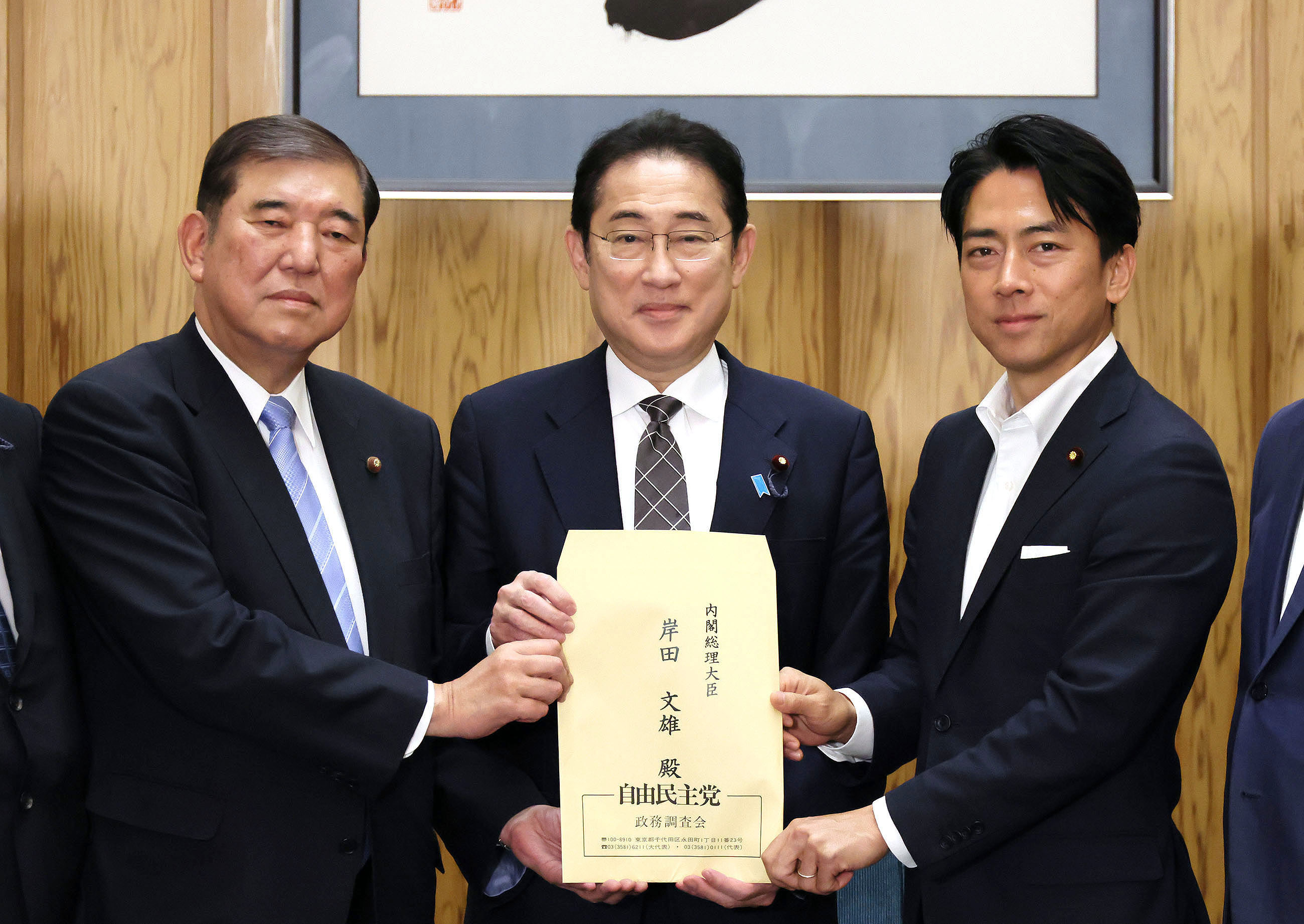
Koizumi ran against Shigeru Ishiba, who replaced Fumio Kishida as Prime Minister after winning the LDP leadership election.

On 14 August 2024, Prime Minister Fumio Kishida announced he would not seek a second term as LDP President, making the race an open field. By late August, both Kono and Ishiba had already declared their respective candidacies.

On 6 September, Koizumi officially announced his candidacy for the LDP presidency. In a press conference he pledged to introduce legislation that would legalize separate surnames for married couples and proposed holding a national referendum to determine whether or not Article 9 of the Constitution should be amended. Koizumi promised to dissolve the lower of house and call a general election “as soon as possible” if elected President and later Prime Minister. His candidacy was endorsed by former prime minister Yoshihide Suga. Koizumi gave his first street speech the following day in Tokyo's Ginza district. Koizumi, along with fellow front-runner Shigeru Ishiba, has been described as one of the "centrists" of the election.

Koizumi lost the election, placing third behind Sanae Takaichi and Shigeru Ishiba. Ishiba defeated Takaichi in a runoff election, having received support from Koizumi's camp. As LDP president, Ishiba appointed Koizumi chairman of the Election Strategy Committee, a senior party office. In the October 2024 general election Koizumi traveled across the country to rally support for LDP candidates, but the results were unfavourable, with the ruling coalition losing its majority. Koizumi, who had easily won re-election in his own seat, resigned as election strategy chairman to take responsibility. He was replaced by Seiji Kihara as the party's election chief. Koizumi was subsequently appointed as executive secretary to the LDP political reform headquarters.

When asked in February 2025 about the possibility of running for party leadership again, Koizumi did not rule it out, saying "I will do my best to become a politician that people want to support." Later that month, Koizumi suggested that the Kansai-based opposition Innovation Party should join the LDP-Komeito coalition, amidst budget negotiations that were taking place in the lower house. He continued to advocate for this, stating “we should officially ask for a coalition” in March. Koizumi simultaneously criticized the possibility of a grand coalition with the Constitutional Democratic Party, the chief opposition party.

=== Minister of Agriculture (2025) ===
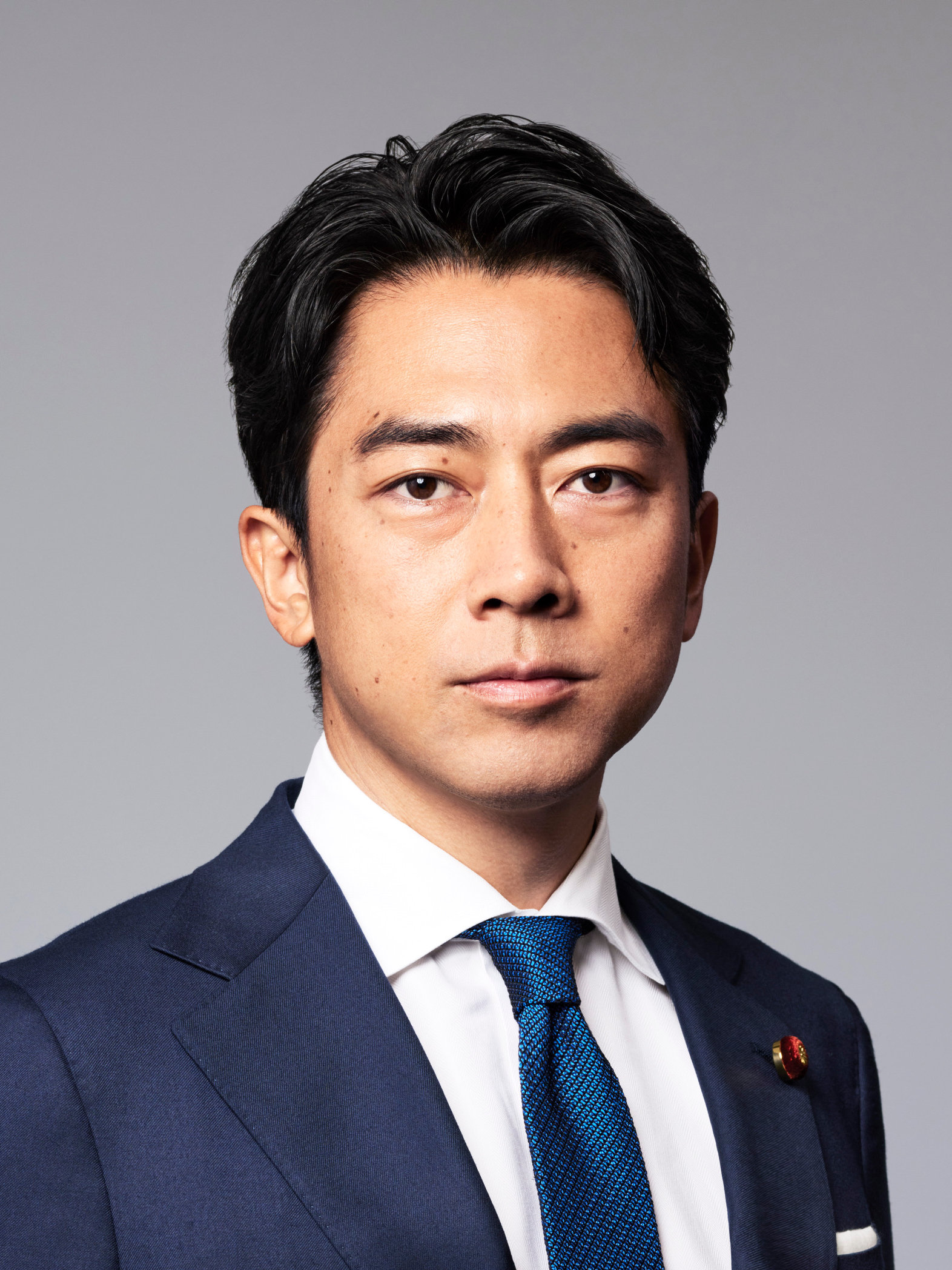
Official portrait as Minister of Agriculture, May 2025

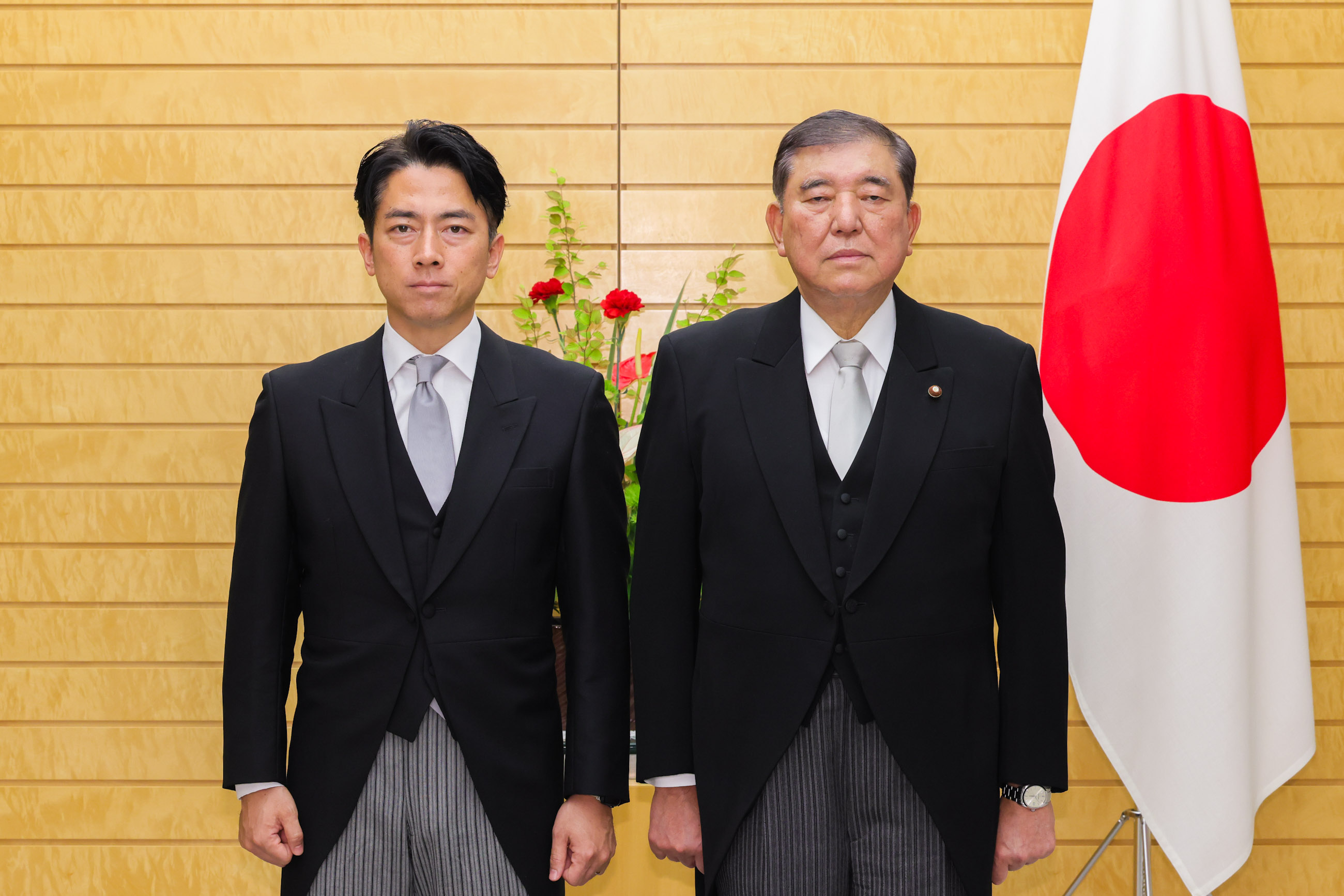
Koizumi with Prime Minister Shigeru Ishiba, shortly after his appointment as Agriculture Minister, 21 May 2025

On 21 May 2025, Agriculture, Forestry and Fisheries Minister Taku Etō submitted his resignation to Prime Minister Shigeru Ishiba, after stating on 18 May that he had never bought rice, and was instead provided with a free supply of it from his local constituents; the comments were considered to be inconsiderate amidst a nationwide rice shortage, and reportedly upset Ishiba. Koizumi, having chaired the LDP's Agriculture & Forestry Division and its Comprehensive Fisheries Policy Research Council, was immediately seen as the most likely successor to the disgraced Etō, who had been sacked by Ishiba. Koizumi was appointed Agriculture Minister by Ishiba on the same day. He stated that Koizumi's main objective in the new role would be to stabilize rice prices. Etō and Koizumi had a testy relationship dating back 10 years when the former reportedly told Koizumi, who is 20 years his junior, "I hate you". However the two reportedly became friends after Koizumi invited Etō to dinner at some point afterwards.

I thought that Mr. Koizumi has experience, insight, and passion for reform in both agriculture and the fisheries industry.

— Shigeru Ishiba explaining why he appointed Koizumi Agriculture Minister.

Koizumi's first official act as Agriculture Minister was to temporarily suspend bidding for stockpiled rice. He also confirmed to reporters that he himself had purchased rice for his family. Upon taking up the new role, Koizumi styled himself as the “Minister in Charge of Rice.” At a speech given at the Ministry of Agriculture, Forestry and Fisheries the day following his appointment, Koizumi emphasized the importance of reducing rice prices, saying he felt "a sense of crisis" and would seek to restore public trust in the ministry. Koizumi sought to enact swift reforms at the ministry upon his appointment. At his inaugural press conference the previous day, he told reporters that the government would temporarily cancel the fourth bidding process for stockpiled rice that was originally scheduled for later in May, and said he was considering cancelling competitive bidding for the rice in favor of selling it directly to supermarkets and the food service industry through discretionary contracts. Koizumi stated that the goal of the ministry would be to lower rice prices to ¥2,000 per 5 kilograms by June.

=== 2025 LDP leadership election ===
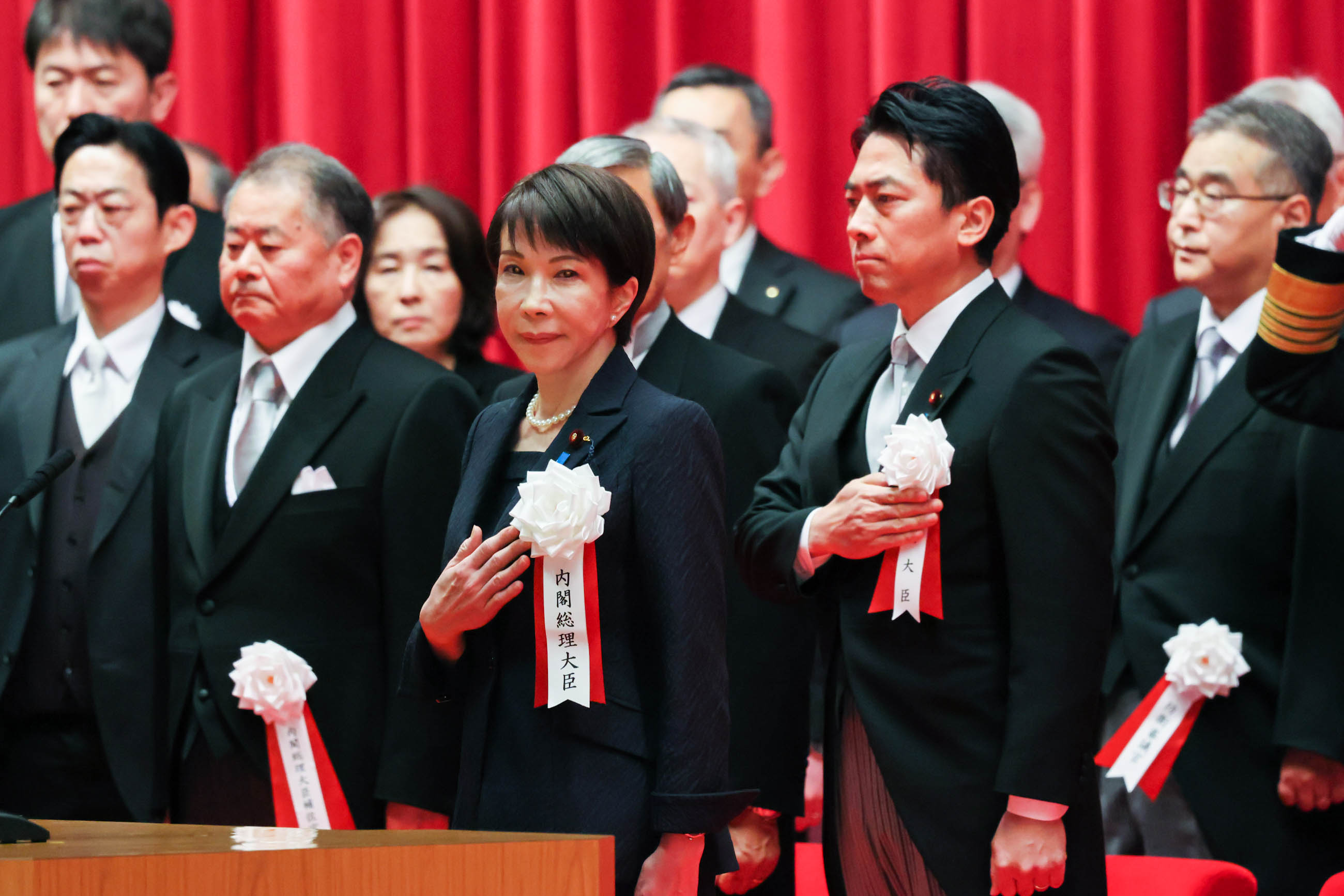
After defeating him in a runoff election for the leadership of the LDP, Sanae Takaichi (left) appointed Koizumi (right) as Minister of Defense in her cabinet in October 2025.

After Prime Minister Ishiba resigned, Koizumi announced his second leadership candidacy in September 2025 for the 2025 leadership election. In opinion polls throughout the election, Koizumi and former Economic Security Minister Sanae Takaichi were seen as the frontrunners as they both polled in first place various times.

On September 24, Bunshun Online reported possible stealth marketing by Koizumi's campaign, citing an e-mail by his public relations chief Karen Makishima giving associates examples of comments to make online to promote Koizumi. Koizumi acknowledged the facts and apologised on 26 September, but denied having been aware of it. Makishima resigned from the campaign. This led to his campaign receiving several death threats and bomb threats, however Koizumi stated his intent to keep running in the election.

On 4 October, Takaichi came in first place during the first round of voting with 183 (31.07%) of the vote. Koizumi came in second with 164 (27.84%) of the vote, meaning that both Koizumi and Takaichi advanced to the run-off to elect the party leader. Takaichi would go on to defeat Koizumi in the run-off by a 54% to 46% margin.

=== Minister of Defense (since 2025) ===
==== First term ====
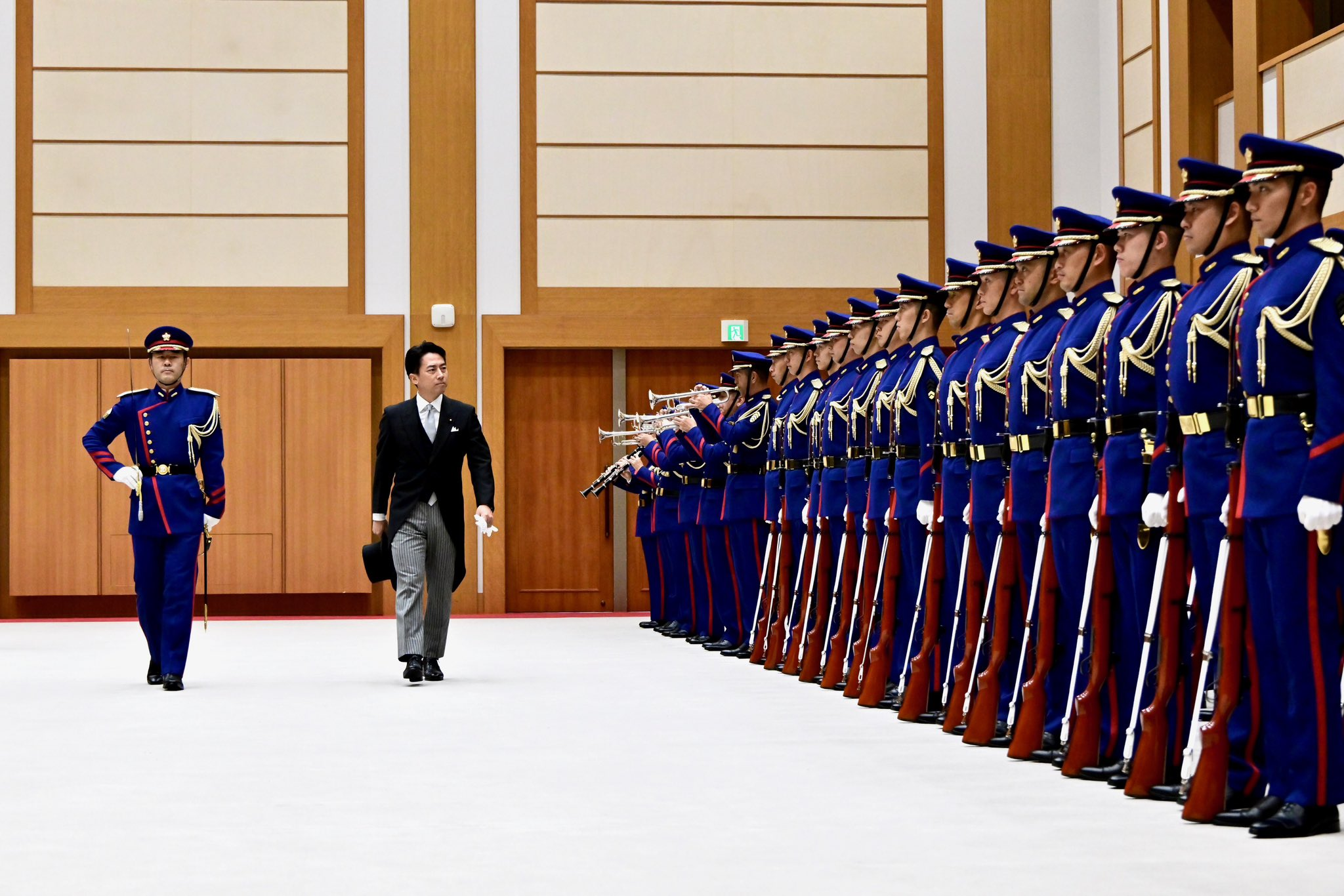
Koizumi receiving honors at the Ministry of Defense auditorium shortly after his appointment, 22 October 2025.

On 21 October 2025, Koizumi was appointed as Minister of Defense by Prime Minister Sanae Takaichi. At his inaugural press conference the following day, he told reporters that he wants to ease the country's rules on defense equipment exports, and move up the revision of the government's three key defense and security policy documents.

A few days after his appointment as Defense Minister, the Air Self-Defense Force scrambled jets to monitor Russian warplanes, including strategic bombers capable of carrying nuclear weapons, which had flown along the edge of Japanese airspace over the west coast of the Sea of Japan. Koizumi indicated the appearance of Russian aircraft, which occurred hours before Takaichi pledged to increase defense spending by 2% of gross domestic product by the end of this fiscal year in a speech before the Diet, may be retribution for Japan's support for Ukraine since Russia began invading the country in 2022.

On 29 October 2025, one week after becoming Defense Minister, Koizumi held talks with United States Secretary of Defense Pete Hegseth in Tokyo. Koizumi greeted Trump along with Takaichi when he visited Yokosuka Naval Base as part of his three-day visit to Japan that same month.

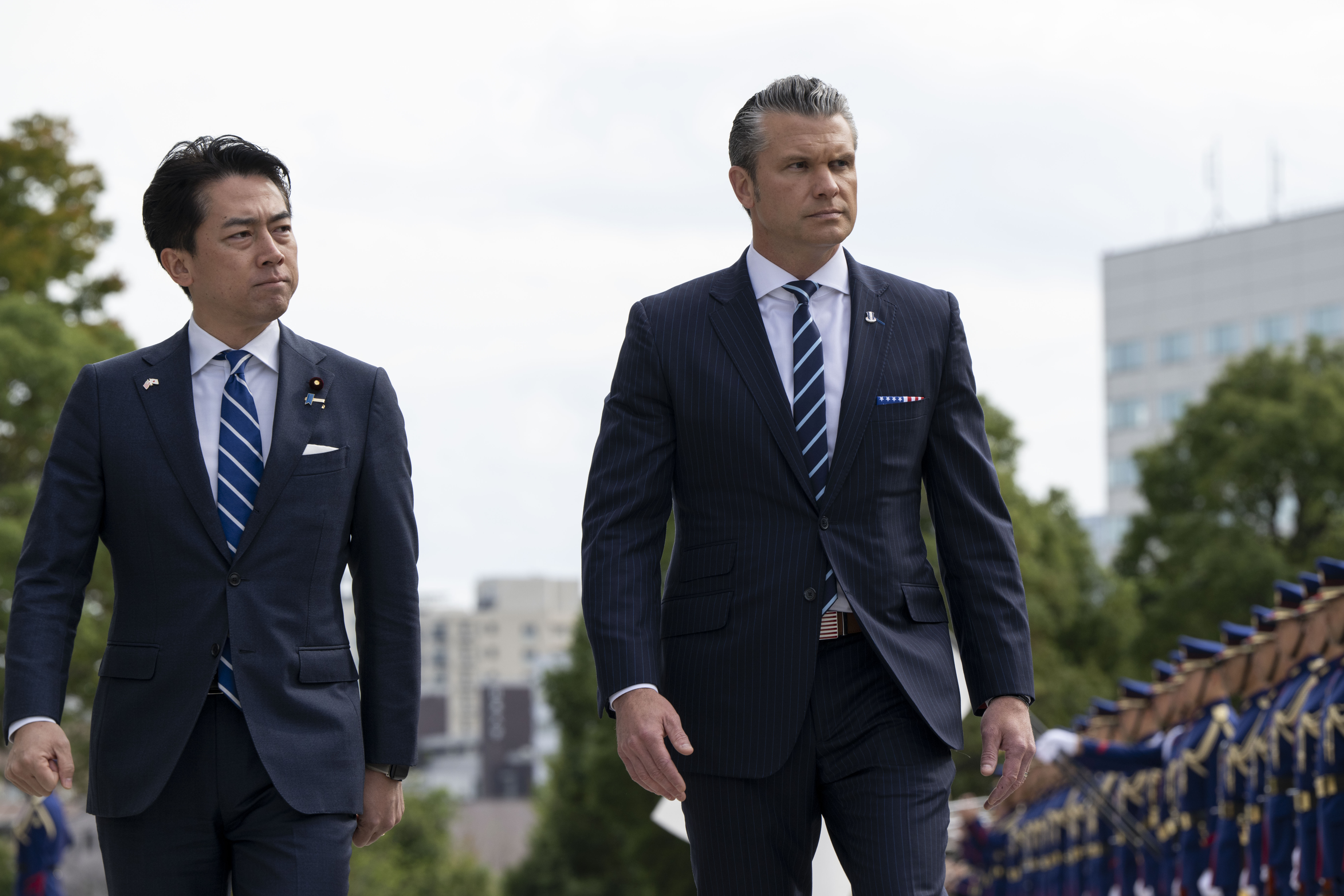
Koizumi welcomes US Secretary of Defense Pete Hegseth at the Ministry of Defense in Tokyo, 29 October 2025.

Koizumi attended the Association of Southeast Asian Nations (ASEAN) Defense Ministers meeting held in Kuala Lumpur in November, and met with counterparts from the United States, Australia, and the Philippines to discuss increased deterrence and readiness in the South China Sea. Also present at the summit was Chinese defense chief Dong Jun, with whom he aired concerns regarding intensifying military activities in the East China Sea and broader Pacific. After the summit, Koizumi said New Zealand Defense Minister Judith Collins expressed interest in acquiring Japanese Mogami-class destroyers.

After South Korea's Defense Ministry announced plans to acquire and build its own nuclear-powered attack submarines, Koizumi argued Japan should consider the same, noting Japan's strategic environment was “severe” in November 2025.

On 7 November, during a meeting of the Budget Committee in the lower house, Prime Minister Takaichi stated that a Chinese military attack or naval blockade against Taiwan would be considered an emergency and could be deemed a "survival-threatening situation" for Japan. After senior Chinese diplomats criticized the remarks, Koizumi noted that Takaichi's remarks did not represent a shift in Japan's long-held policy regarding Taiwan. The following month, Koizumi confirmed plans to deploy a medium-range surface-to-air missile unit on Yonaguni Island, located about 68 miles off Taiwan's coast.

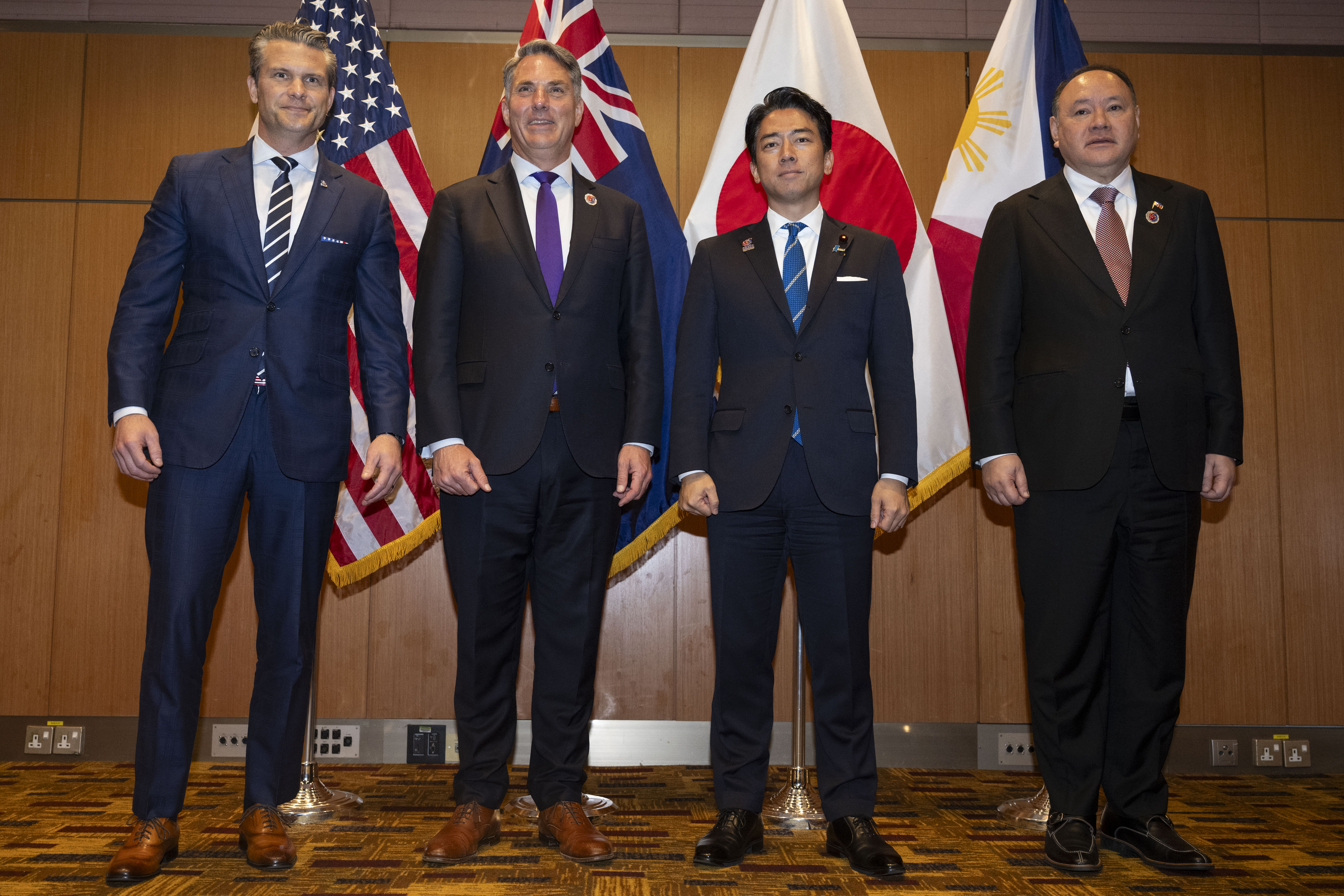
Koizumi at a multilateral meeting in Kuala Lumpur, with his respective counterparts from the US, Australia, and the Philippines: Pete Hegseth, Richard Marles, and Gilbert Teodoro, 1 November 2025

On 6 December, Chinese military aircraft locked radar on Japanese Air Self-Defense Force fighter jets near Okinawa. The Defense Ministry claimed People's Liberation Army Air Force J-15 jets took off from the Chinese carrier Liaoning and “intermittently” latched its radar on Japanese F-15 fighter jets on two occasions for about three minutes. Koizumi protested the incident, calling it a “a dangerous act that exceeded the scope necessary for safe aircraft operations.” The following day, Koizumi met with Australian Defense Minister Richard Marles, who described the situation as “worrying”. The two agreed to deepen security cooperation, and expressed optimism about the Australian Navy’s plan to introduce an upgraded version of the Japanese Maritime Self-Defense Force’s Mogami-class frigate. During the meeting, Marles and Koizumi announcing the launching of a “framework for strategic defense coordination”. A few days following the radar incident, Koizumi said Japan would monitoring activities and discussed the issue with Pete Hegseth during a phone call.

In January 2026, Koizumi embarked on a visit to Washington D.C. where he met with Pete Hegseth for the second time. The two worked out in a gym alongside US military personnel. When meeting with Hegseth, Koizumi described the US-Japan alliance as “unshakeable”. He later visited the Japanese consulate in Los Angeles to mark the 15th anniversary of Operation Tomodachi. Before arriving in the continental United States, Koizumi traveled to Hawaii with U.S. Ambassador to Japan George Glass and spoke at the Honolulu Defense Forum. Later in January, het with South Korean Defense Minister Ahn Gyu-back in Koizumi's home prefecture of Kanagawa, as part of the “shuttle diplomacy” established during the Fumio Kishida administration. The two agreed to promote the denuclearization of the Korean Peninsula and to upgrade defence cooperation, and reiterated commitment to trilateral cooperation with the United States. After the meeting, the two played a friendly game of table tennis, apparently after Koizumi learned Ahn enjoyed the sport.

==== Second term ====
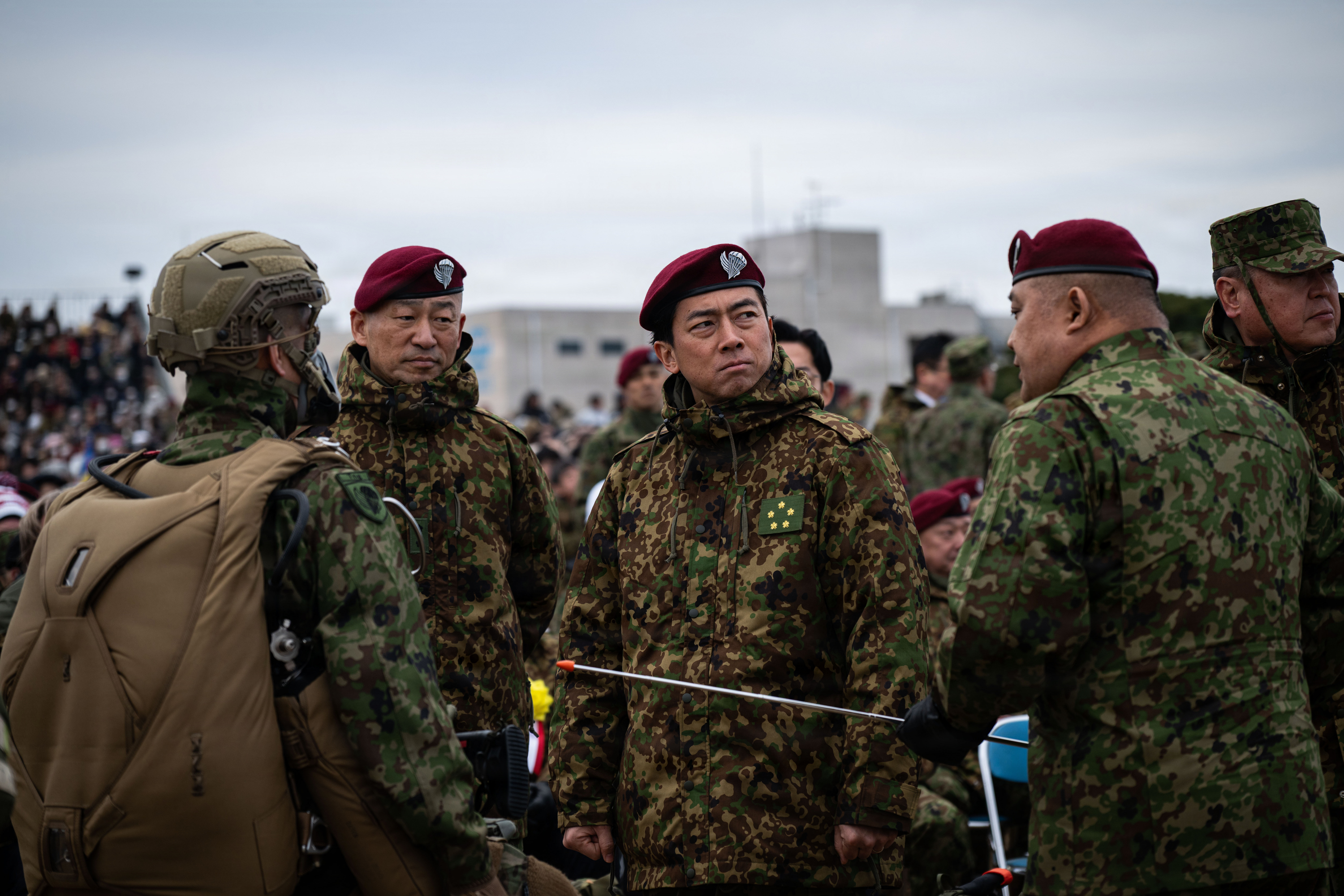
Koizumi watches a demonstration during joint exercises between US and Japanese forces at Narashino, 11 January 2026

Takaichi called a snap election for February 2026 and Koizumi was re-elected in his home Kanagawa district once again. On 18 February 2026, following Takaichi's reelection as prime minister, Koizumi was reappointed as Minister of Defence. Following the general election, which delivered a landslide majority for the LDP, Koizumi stated revisions to Article 9 of the Constitution "should be advanced as quickly as possible”. He later expressed support for holding a national referendum on whether to amend the Constitution. In April, he suggested that Japan should consider producing and possessing attack drones. Later in July, Koizumi stated that Japan “cannot avoid” debates surrounding nuclear weapons, noting that the Russian invasion of Ukraine four years prior prompted France to boost its own nuclear capabilities.

Koizumi attended the Munich Security Conference a few days following the general election. During his speech delivered on 13 February, Koizumi reiterated the importance of the rules-based global order, and linked security in the Euro-Atlantic to security in the Indo-Pacific. While he did not explicitly mention China, Koizumi noted that "countries sounding Japan continue their opaque military buildup…In the East and the South China Seas, attempts to change the status quo by force persist. In the western and the southern Pacific, provocative military activities are intensifying".

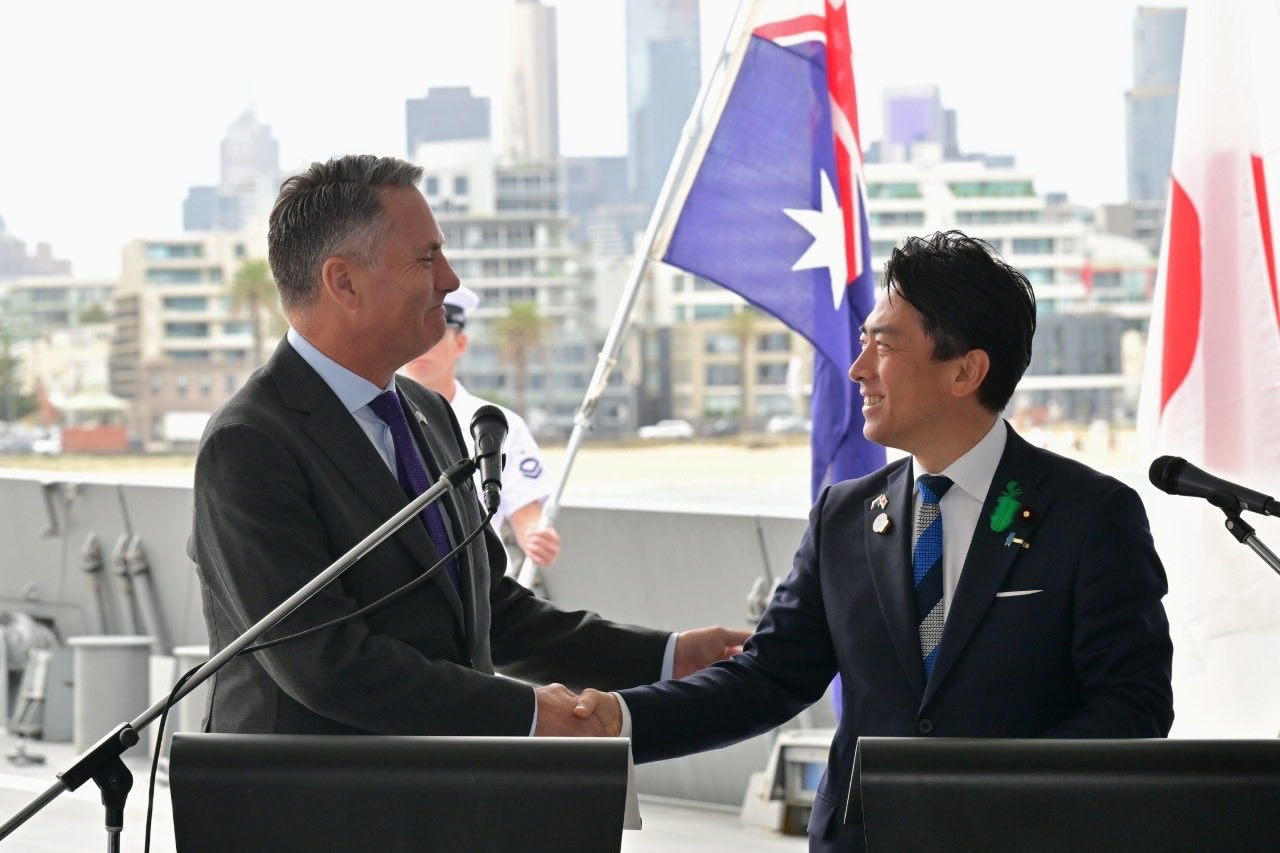
Koizumi and Australian Defense Minister Richard Marles affirm a frigate contract on the JS Kumano, 18 April 2026.

In early April, Australian Defense Minister Richard Marles paid another visit to Japan to discuss potential joint missile and drone production with Koizumi. The two stressed that security issues elsewhere, such as the Middle East, should not come at the expense of security in the Indo-Pacific. Later that month, Japan and Australia agreed to a contract to deliver the first three of a 10 billion Australian dollar (~1 trillion yen) fleet of Japanese-designed warships, with the first due for delivery in three years from 2026. On 18 April, Koizumi and Marles attended a ceremonial signing ceremony aboard the Mogami-class frigate JS Kumano, docked off the coast of Melbourne. A few days later, the Ministry of Defense announced it would be scrapping restrictions on overseas arms sales and opening the way for exports of warships, missiles and other weapons as part of an overhaul of domestic defence export rules.

In early May, Koizumi visited the Philippines and Indonesia, where he discussed expanding security cooperation, including exports of defense equipment with counterparts. Koizumi met with his Indonesian counterpart Sjafrie Sjamsoeddin in Jakarta, where the two signed a cooperation agreement that underlined the need to safeguard regional peace and stability. He met with President Bongbong Marcos in Manila to discuss Chinese activity in the South China Sea. Koizumi witnessed the Balikatan exercise with Filipino Secretary of National Defense Gilberto Teodoro in Ilocos Norte, where the Japanese Self-Defense Forces joined the American and Filipino armed forces in the training exercises for the first time. While in the Philippines, Koizumi announced that the Ministry of Defense was planning on transferring of Abukuma class destroyers and TC-90 aircraft to the Armed Forces of the Philippines early.

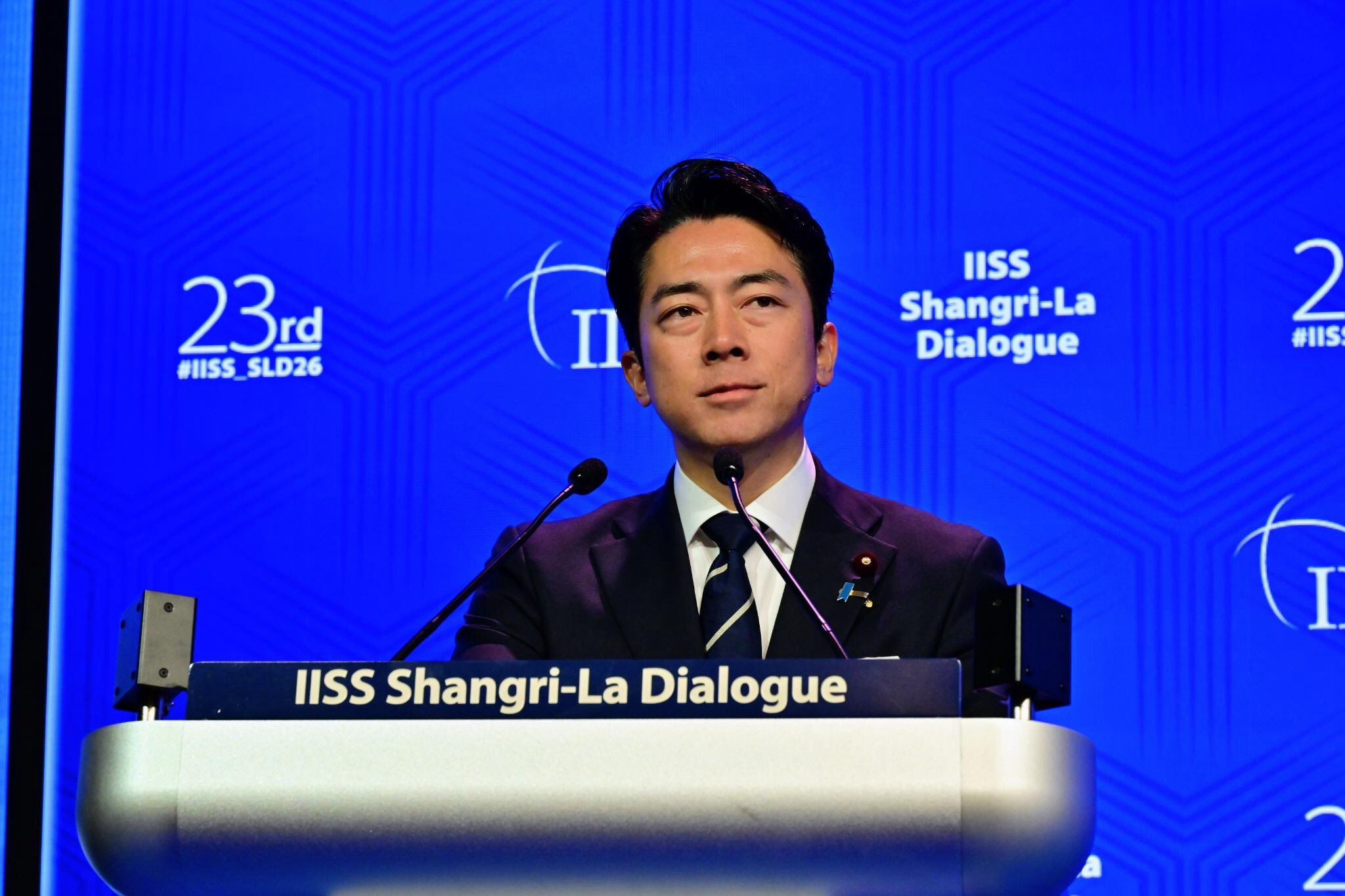
Koizumi speaking at the Shangri-La Dialogue, 31 May 2026.

Koizumi attended the Shangri-La Dialogue security summit held in Singapore and organized by the International Institute for Strategic Studies (IISS), in late May. On the sidelines of the summit, Koizumi and Hegseth agreed to deepen defense-industrial cooperation and accelerate joint production of advanced missile systems, specifically SM-3 Block IIA interceptor missiles and AMRAAM air-to-air missiles. The two also announced the Trilateral Air/Surface/Missile Information Sharing in the Indo-Pacific (TRISHIP) had been finalized with Australia. Hegseth expressed support for Japan expanding domestic defense production; in a speech delivered at the summit, he lauded Japan's efforts to increase defense spending. During Koizumi's own speech delivered on 31 May, he rebuked claims from China that Japan was embracing a “new militarism” and pledged to keep strengthening the Japanese military. He described Japan as a “peace-loving nation [that] has been valued by the region and by [the] international community” that would not be shaken by false claims.

Think about it. There is a country that has a huge arsenal of nuclear weapons and strategic bombers. Japan has neither of such weapons. And yet, Japan is labelled (as) ‘new militarism’. Isn’t it strange?

— Shinjiro Koizumi

Koizumi made his first trip to South Korea as Defense Minister on 27 June, greeting Defense Minister Ahn Gyu-back in Seoul, their sixth encounter overall since Koizumi's tenure began. The Diplomat described the meeting as a sign of “remarkable normalization of cooperation between the two countries’ defense authorities” and considered it to be an indication of reconciliation. The two agreed to advance discussions on defense equipment and technology cooperation.

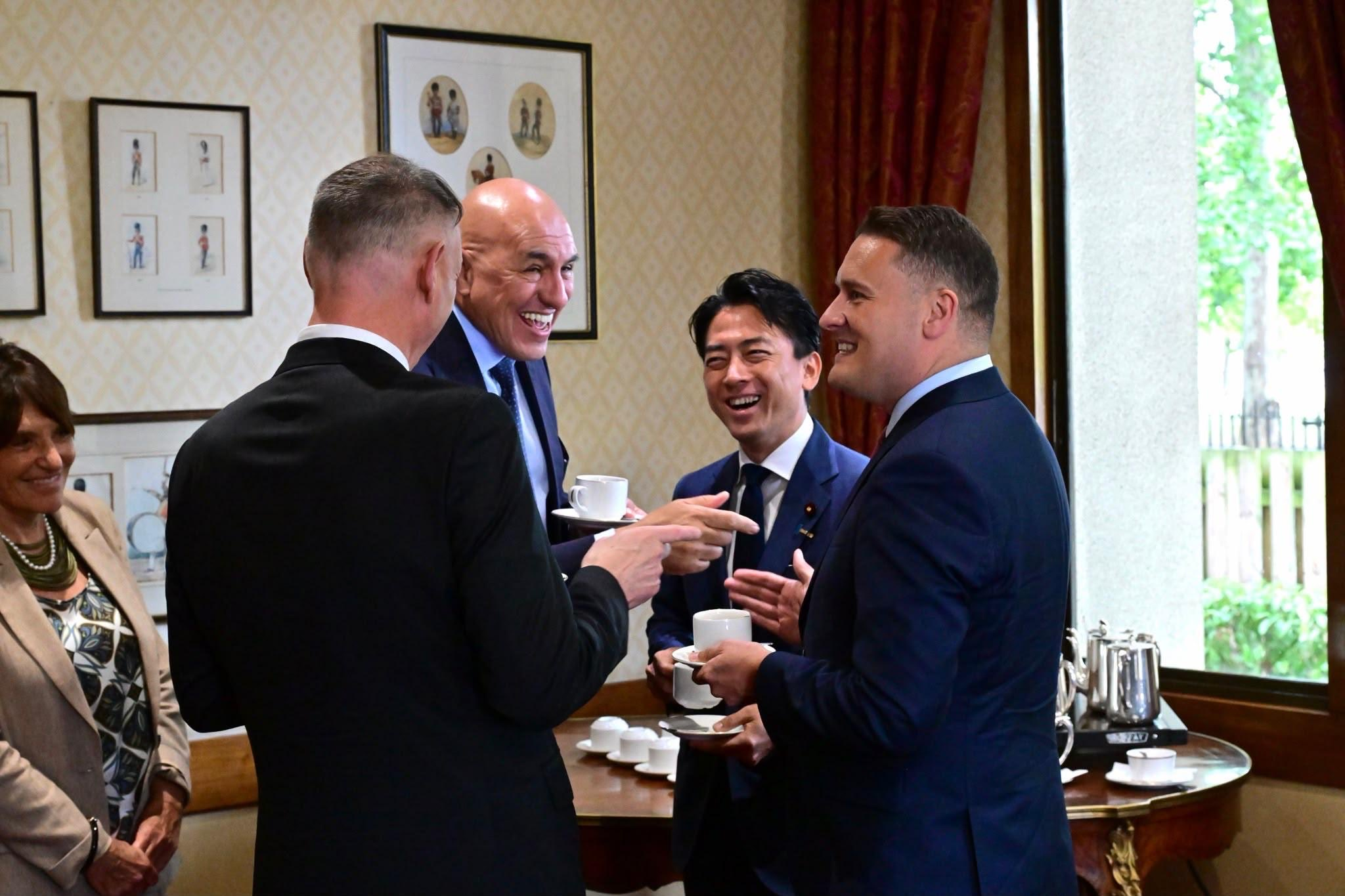
Koizumi with Canadian Defense Minister David McGuinty, Italian Defense Minister Guido Crosetto, and British Defense Secretary Wes Streeting at the GCAP conference, 21 July 2026.

He attended a press conference for the Global Combat Air Programme (GCAP) in July at Wellington Barracks in London, joining Italian Defense Minister Guido Crosetto and recently appointed British Defense Secretary Wes Streeting. Koizumi helped welcome Canada's entry into the 6th-generation fighter project as an observer nation. Earlier that month he traveled to Turkey to attend the 2026 Ankara NATO summit, becoming the first Japanese defense minister to participate in the defense industry forum. He was joined by Foreign Minister Toshimitsu Motegi.

Koizumi visited the controversial Yasukuni Shrine on 14 August to commemorate the 81st anniversary of the end of World War II. The Chinese Foreign Ministry condemned the visit, while South Korean Foreign Minister Cho Hyun expressed “deep regret” over what he described as “anachronistic” actions. The last Japanese defense minister to pay respects at the shrine was Minoru Kihara in 2024, although Prime Minister Takaichi did not visit herself in 2026.

In August 2026, Koizumi met with Marles in Canberra to announce plans for Japan and Australia to collaborate in missile production; both countries would co-develop a laser system to detect potential threats under a new defence cooperation project named 'Boobook' while Japan said it would conduct tests of hypersonic missiles and other projectiles in Australia. Later that month, Koizumi met with Indian Defense Minister Rajnath Singh in New Delhi. The two signed a memorandum on maritime security cooperation and promised to bolster defence cooperation ‘to realize a free and open’ Indo-Pacific. They also discussed possible joint development in naval shipbuilding and design.

==== Gallery ====
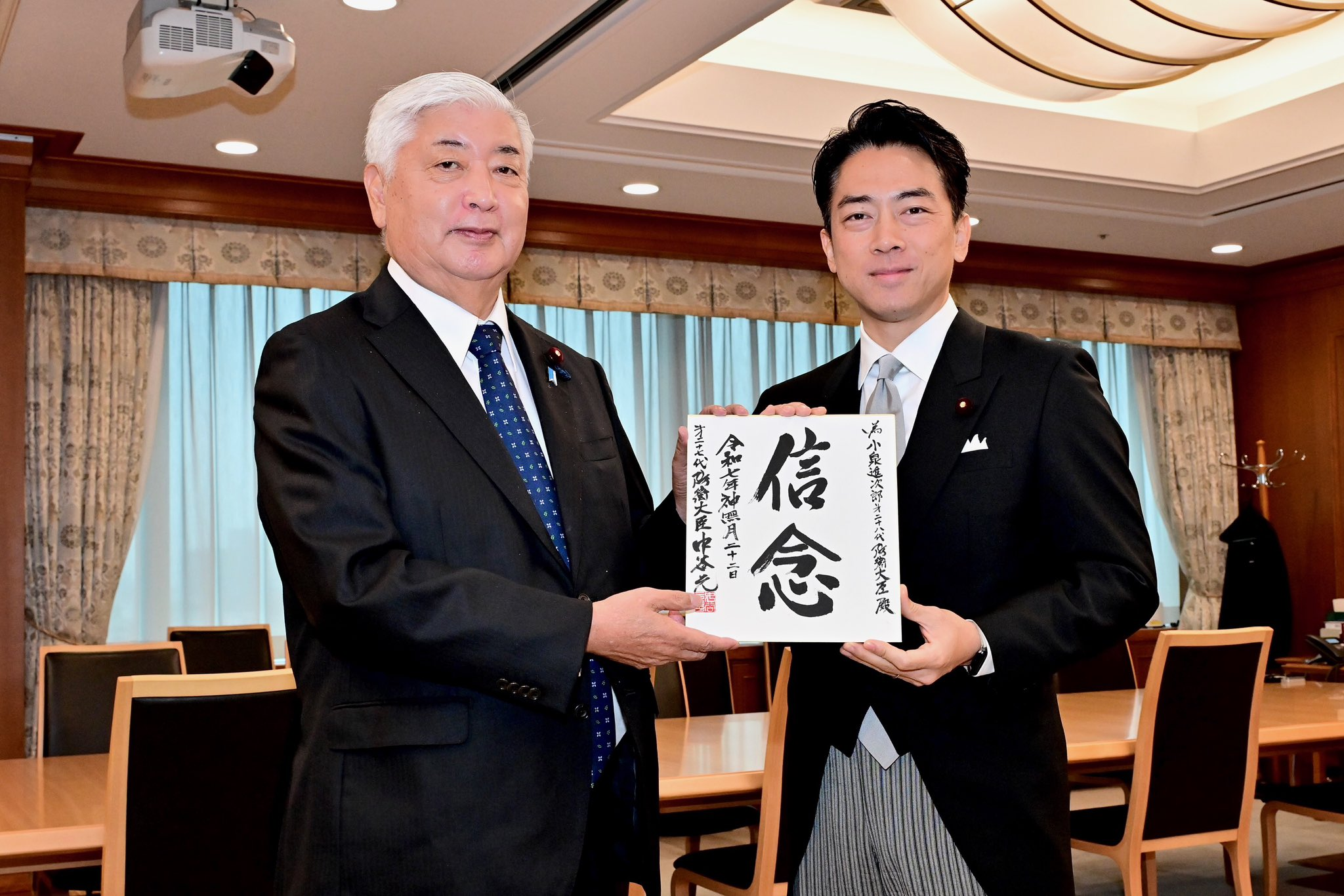
Koizumi with his predecessor Gen Nakatani, shortly after his appointment as Defense Minister, 21 October 2025

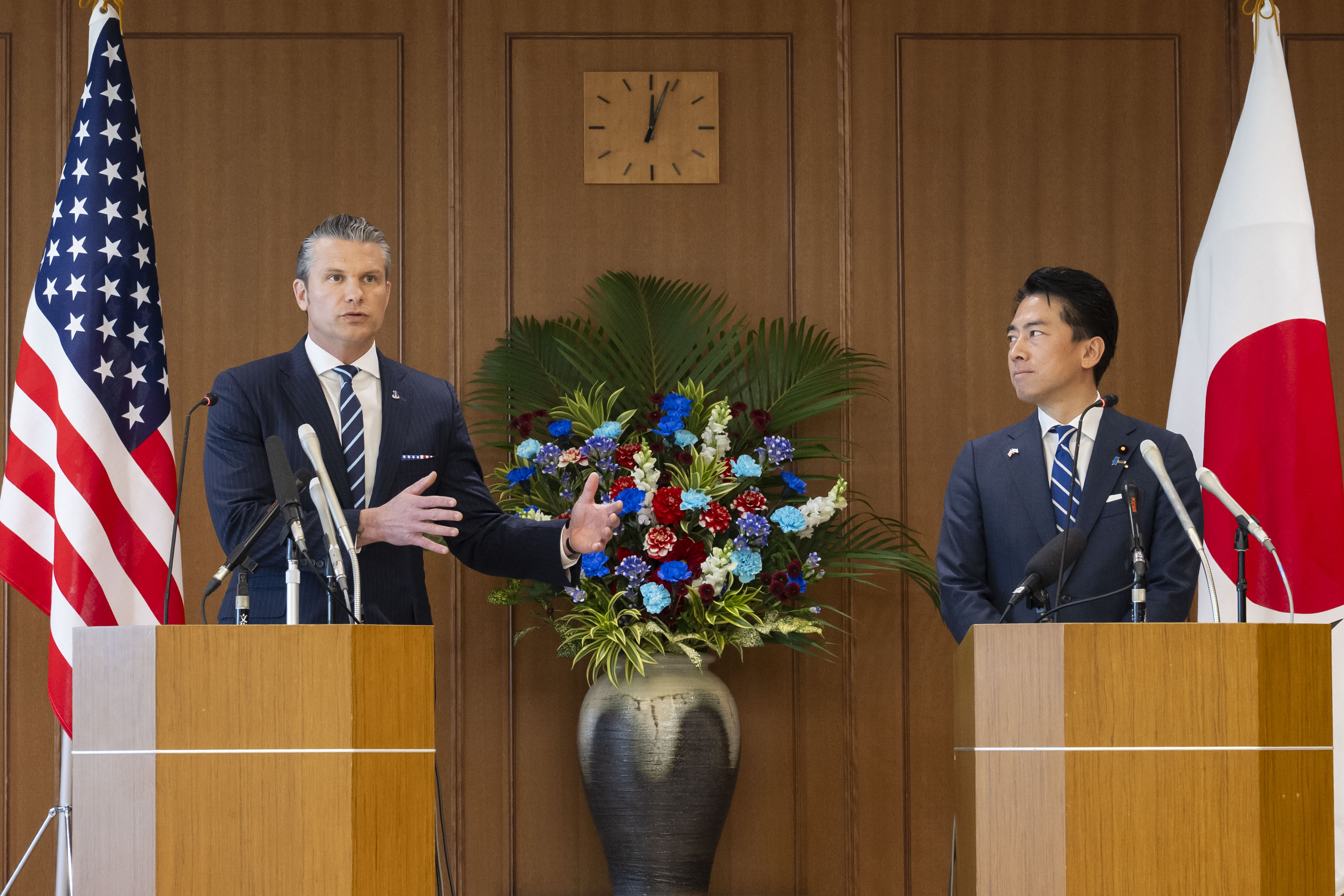
Koizumi with US Secretary of Defense Pete Hegseth, 28 October 2025

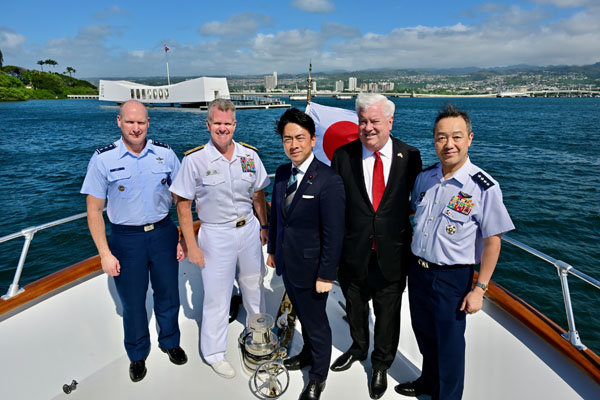
Koizumi with the US ambassador to Japan George Glass in Hawaii, 12 January 2026

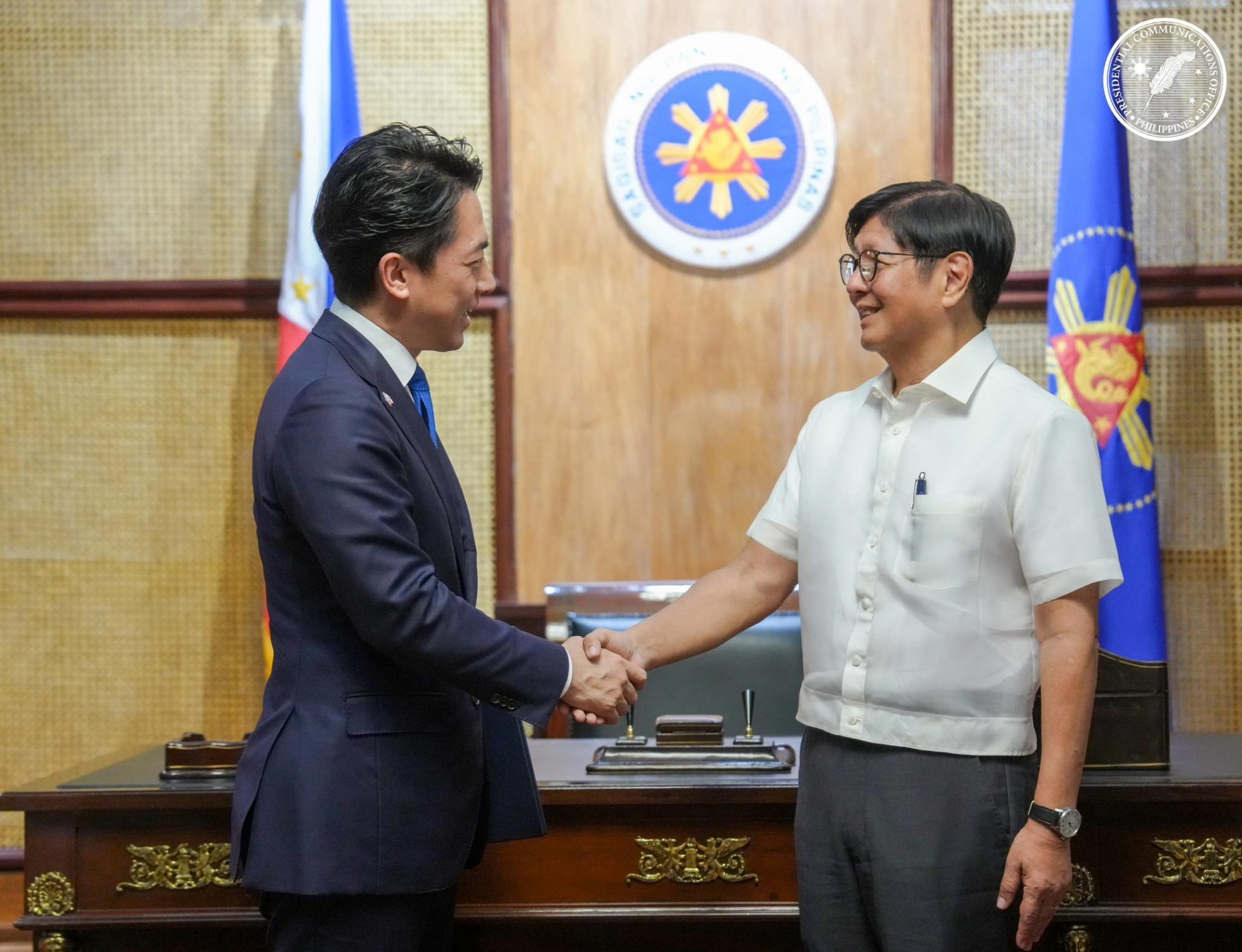
Koizumi with the President of the Philippines Bongbong Marcos, 6 May 2026

== Views ==
Like his father, Koizumi visits Yasukuni Shrine on 15 August, the anniversary of Japan's surrender in World War II. He visited in 2012, 2013, and again in 2022. He visited in 2024 in preparation for his run in the 2024 LDP leadership election. Koizumi visited the shrine again in 2025, on the 80th anniversary of the end of World War II.

In a May 2013 interview with the Sankei Shimbun, he refused to comment on Osaka mayor Toru Hashimoto's controversial remarks on comfort women, characterizing the issue as one that should be discussed among experts and historians rather than politicians. He described the perceived nationalist shift in Japanese politics as "Chinese propaganda" and stated that the government needed to wage a better public relations campaign against it while focusing on the successful implementation of Abenomics. He also commented on the Japanese Constitution, stating that amendments were necessary but that there were more immediate problems to be solved: "I go to the disaster zones in Tohoku every month, and the constitution has not come up even once as an issue when I walk down the street there."

Koizumi was critical of the Abe government's decision to terminate a corporate tax surcharge intended to fund the Tohoku recovery, and views nuclear power as unsustainable in the long term, mirroring views that his father expressed in 2013.

In 2017, when asked on his position on same-sex marriage in a survey conducted by The Asahi Shimbun, Koizumi did not give a response. In a 2021 survey conducted by NHK, he said he was in favor of its legalization. When asked again in August 2024, Koizumi did not respond. In a 2024 survey conducted by NHK for the general election held in October of that year, Koizumi affirmed his support for legalization. When asked again by NHK ahead of the 2026 general election, Koizumi stated his opposition to legalization of same-sex marriage for the first time.

Koizumi opposes a ban on corporate donations to political campaigns and parties, arguing that politics shouldn't be "funded entirely by tax money."

He is in favor of allowing selective surnames for married couples. During the 2024 LDP leadership election, Koizumi claimed he would submit a bill into the Diet that would legalize such a system. He later stated that LDP members of the Diet should be free to vote on any legislation related to the matter based on their own views, rather than be restricted to a party consensus.

Speaking on the LDP's culture in March 2025, Koizumi stated that "the one thing that needs to change in the culture of the LDP is that as soon as approval ratings drop, we immediately try to drag the leader down". The comments came while some within the party had been calling for Prime Minister Ishiba to resign following news of a scandal.

Since becoming Defense Minister in 2025, Koizumi has described cooperation between South Korea and the United States as “critical” to regional security.

== Popularity ==
Koizumi had a 75.6% approval rating at the start of his stint as parliamentary secretary for Tohoku recovery. In a December 2013 JNN poll, he ranked second after Shinzo Abe as the most favoured candidate for prime minister, although 57% responded that they had no particular favoured candidate. In April 2017, in the aftermath of the Moritomo Gakuen scandal surrounding Prime Minister Abe, polls by Yomiuri and NTV showed Koizumi as the most favoured LDP leader (and presumptive prime minister), surpassing both Abe and challenger Shigeru Ishiba.

Following the December 2012 election, the National Diet Building gift shop began selling "Shinji-Rolls" (進次ろうる), souvenir green tea-flavoured roll cakes branded with Koizumi's likeness. Shinji-Rolls became the gift shop's second most popular item in 2013, outselling souvenirs branded with the likenesses of LDP leaders Shigeru Ishiba and Taro Aso, and outsold only by manju bearing the likeness of Shinzo Abe.

A November 2023 poll from The Asahi Shimbun found Koizumi to be the “most suitable” candidate for Prime Minister among seven ruling party lawmakers, with 16% support. A survey from Jiji Press conducted following month showed similar results, with Koizumi surpassing incumbent Prime Minister Fumio Kishida, Digital Minister Taro Kono and future Prime Minister Shigeru Ishiba in the poll.

The Nikkei stated in 2025 that Koizumi possessed some of the 'best communication skills' in Japanese politics.

== Personal life ==
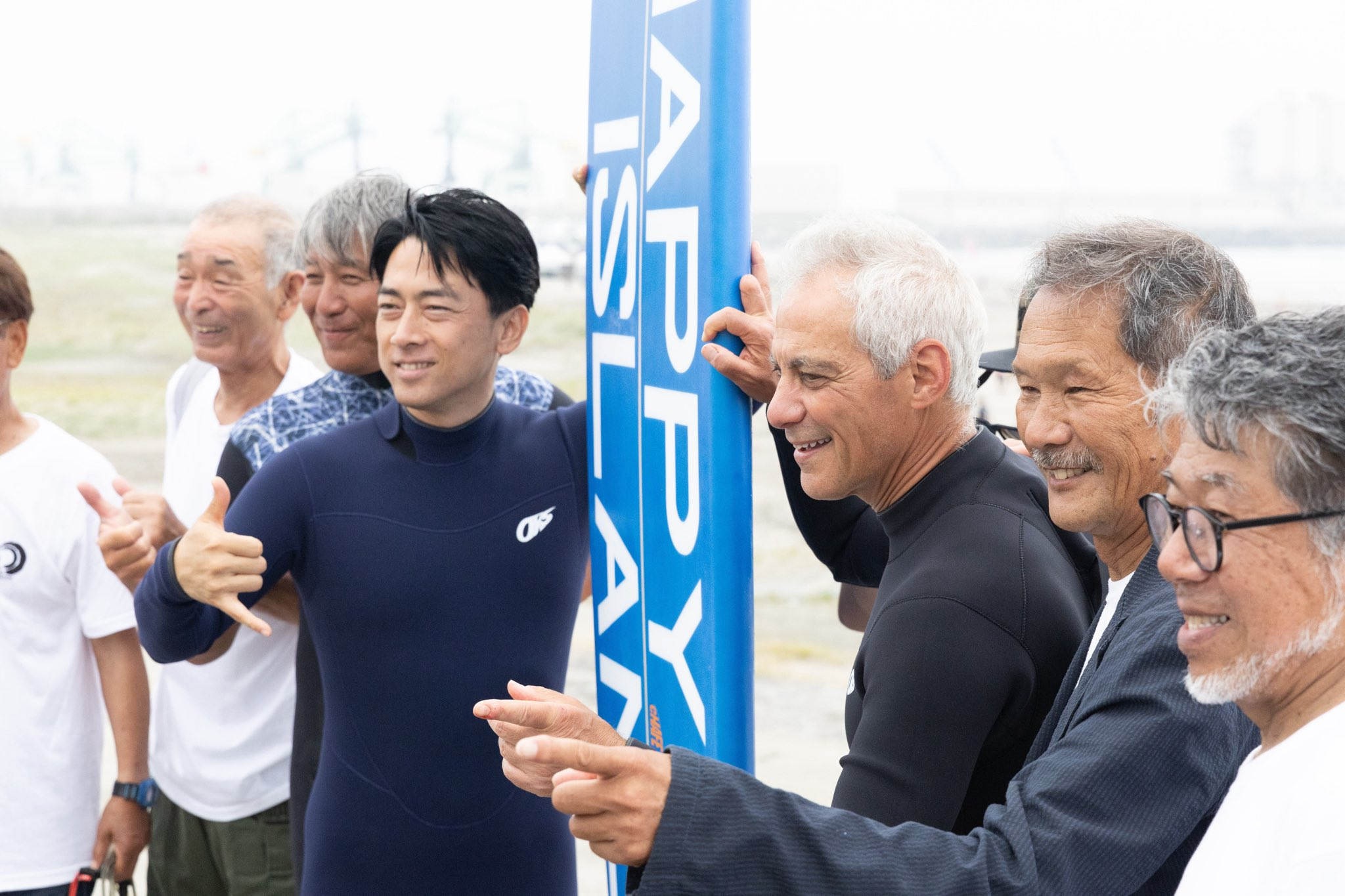
Koizumi with U.S. Ambassador Rahm Emanuel during a surfing competition, 6 July 2024.

On 7 August 2019, television announcer and news presenter Christel Takigawa announced that she married Shinjiro Koizumi. She gave birth to a son on 17 January 2020. She gave birth to a daughter on 20 November 2023. In January 2020, Koizumi received international news attention when he announced his plans to take two weeks of paternity leave when his first child was born.

Along with Japanese, Koizumi can speak English.

He is the secretary-general of the Surfing Diet League of the LDP. In September 2023, he surfed on the coasts of Fukushima to dispel concerns regarding the discharge of waste from the decommissioned Fukushima nuclear plant. He returned to Fukushima Prefecture in July 2024 to surf with U.S. Ambassador to Japan Rahm Emanuel while having summer vacation.

Koizumi is also known for visiting "cat cafes" and posting photos to social media about his interactions with cats, with whom he said to be "very popular".

== Ancestry ==
Ancestors of Shinjirō Koizumi

8. Samejima Yazaemon
4. Jun'ya Koizumi
2. Junichiro Koizumi
20. Koizumi Yūhyōe
10. Koizumi Matajirō
21. Okazaki Toku
5. Yoshie Koizumi
11. Ishikawa Katsu
1. Shinjirō Koizumi
3. Kayoko Miyamoto

== Electoral history ==
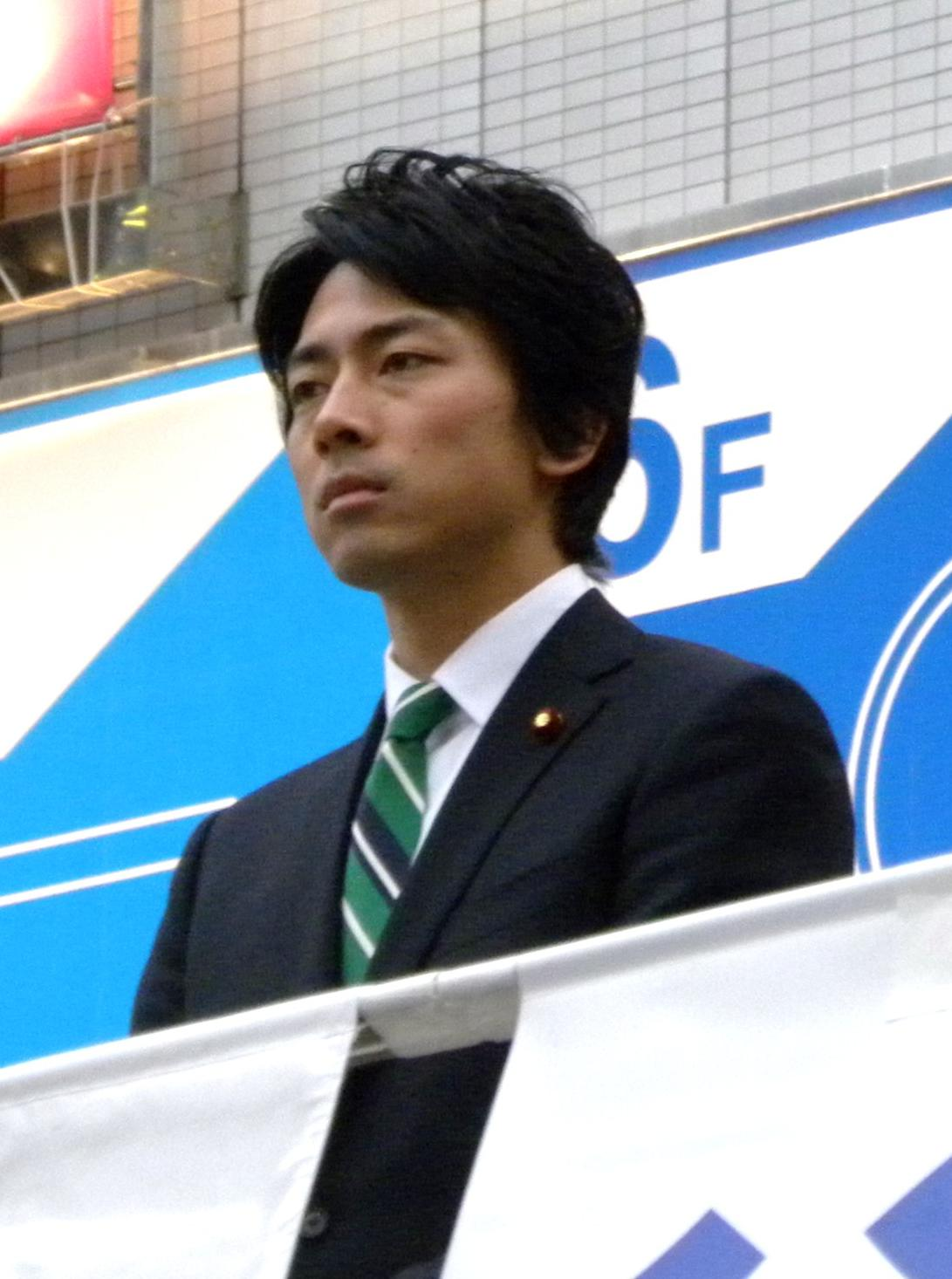
Koizumi campaigning near Shimbashi Station, November 2009

Koizumi was first elected to the House of Representatives in the 2009 general election, representing Kanagawa's 11th district, at the age of 28. The LDP lost its majority in the lower house under the leadership of Prime Minister Taro Aso. Koizumi is a fairly popular candidate, winning Kanagawa's 11th district seat in six consecutive elections.

2009
Party	Candidate	Votes	%	±%
LDP	Shinjirō Koizumi	150,893	56.16	▼17.00
Democratic	Katsuhito Yokokume (elected in S. Kanto PR block)	96,631	35.97	▲17.20
JCP	Masako Itō	12,601	4.69	▲0.47
Happiness Realization	Akihisa Tsurukawa	2,375	0.88	N/A
Independent	Yoshinobu Iwata	1,830	0.68	N/A
Majority		54,262	20.20	▼34.19
Turnout		268,666	68.12	▼0.34
LDP hold		Swing	-17.10	

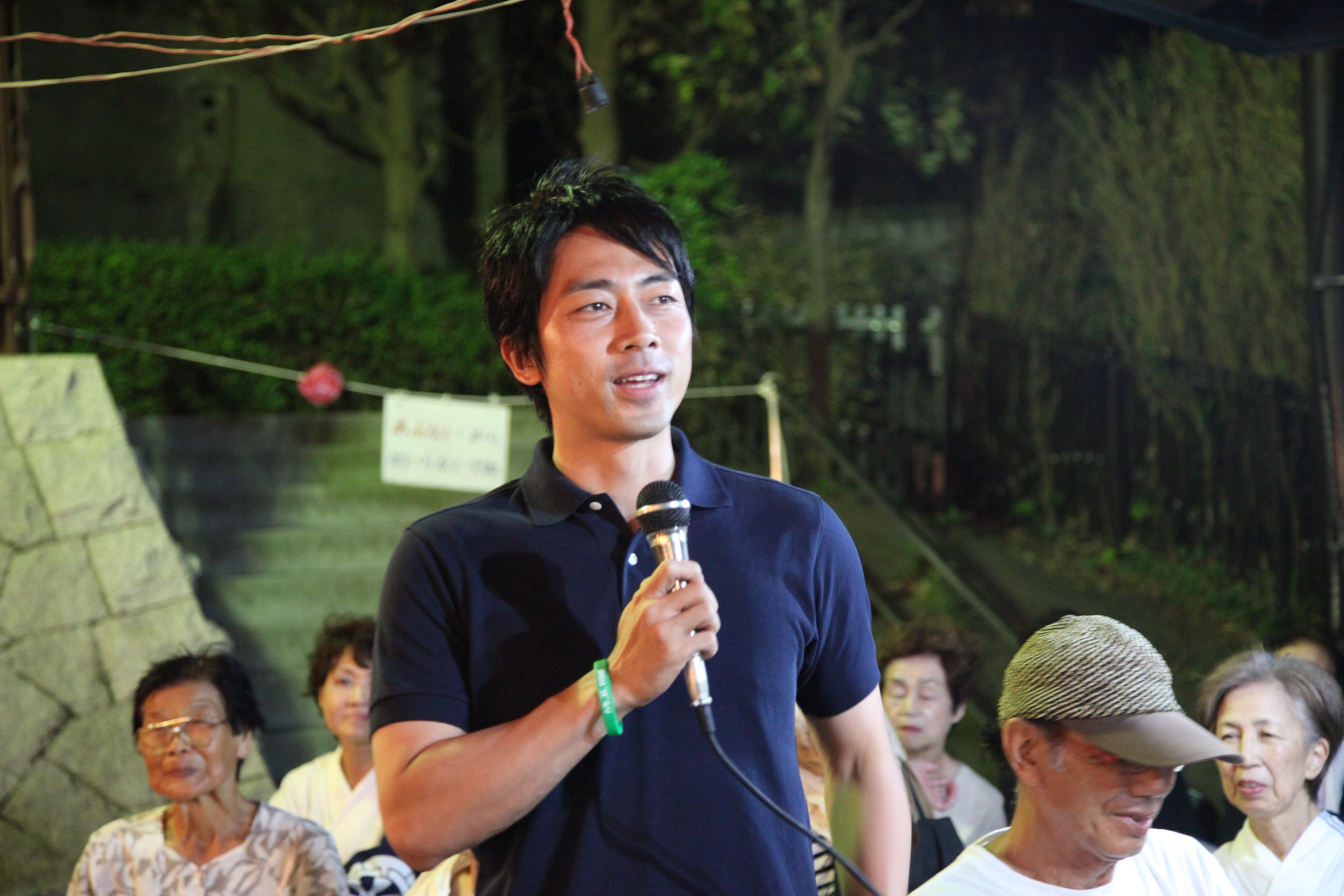
Koizumi speaking during a festival in hometown, Yokosuka, August 2012

In the 2012 general election, Koizumi was reelected by winning ~184,000 votes, or about 80% of the vote.

2012
Party	Candidate	Votes	%	±%
LDP	Shinjirō Koizumi	184,360	79.9	
Democratic	Kōtarō Hayashi	25,134	10.9	
JCP	Michio Saida	17,740	7.7	
Independent	Toshihide Morimoto	2,131	0.9	
Independent	Yoshinobu Iwata	1,489	0.6	

Koizumi won more than 83% of the vote in the 2014 general election, marking his largest margin of victory as a Representative.

2014
Party	Candidate	Votes	%	±%
LDP	Shinjirō Koizumi	168,953	83.3	▲3.4
JCP	Kazuhiro Seto	33,930	16.7	▲9.0
Turnout			54.50	

In the 2017 general election, Koizumi won 78% of the vote, as his vote share declined somewhat.

2017
Party	Candidate	Votes	%	±%
LDP	Shinjirō Koizumi	154,761	78.0	▼5.3
JCP	Kazuhiro Seto	21,874	11.0	▼5.7
Kibō no Tō	Ryō Mashiro	18,583	9.4	
Turnout			52.11	▼2.4

Koizumi was re-elected to a fifth term in the 2021 general election, earning about 79.2% of the vote.

2021
Party	Candidate	Votes	%	±%
LDP	Shinjirō Koizumi	147,634	79.2	▲1.2
JCP	Nobuaki Hayashi	38,843	20.8	▲9.8
Turnout			52.21	▲0.1

The LDP suffered heavy losses during the 2024 general election; Koizumi won re-election with his second lowest margin of victory after the 2009 election, secruing 72.3% of the vote.

2024
Party	Candidate	Votes	%	±%
LDP	Shinjirō Koizumi	129,779	72.3	▼6.9
JCP	Minoru Tamesō	24,850	13.9	▼6.9
Sanseitō	Hiroki Hajikano	24,718	13.7	
Turnout		179,347	51.79	▼0.42

Koizumi easily won re-election to a seventh term during the 2026 general election, winning 79.5% of the vote.

2026
Party	Candidate	Votes	%	±%
LDP	Shinjirō Koizumi	149,029	79.5	▲7.1
JCP	Minoru Tamesō	19,299	10.3	▼3.6
Sanseitō	Kōhei Maebayashi	19,191	10.2	▼3.5
Registered electors		357,788		
Turnout			54.49	▲2.7
LDP hold				

== See also ==
- Koizumi family

House of Representatives (Japan)
Preceded by Junichiro Koizumi	Representative for Kanagawa 11th District; 2009–present	Incumbent
Preceded by Kazuo Yana	Chairman of the Committee on National Security; 2024	Succeeded by Kenji Wakamiya
Political offices
Preceded by Yoshiaki Harada	Minister of the Environment; 2019–2021	Succeeded by Tsuyoshi Yamaguchi
Preceded by Taku Etō	Minister of Agriculture, Forestry and Fisheries; 2025	Succeeded by Norikazu Suzuki
Preceded by Gen Nakatani	Minister of Defense; 2025–present	Incumbent
Party political offices
Preceded by Yoshihisa Furukawa	Director of the Youth Division, Liberal Democratic Party; 2011–2013	Succeeded by Yohei Matsumoto
Preceded by Yuko Obuchi	Chairman of the Election Strategy Committee, Liberal Democratic Party; 2024	Succeeded by Seiji Kihara
