= Koizumi Matajirō =

Japanese politician (1865–1951)

- 小泉 又次郎
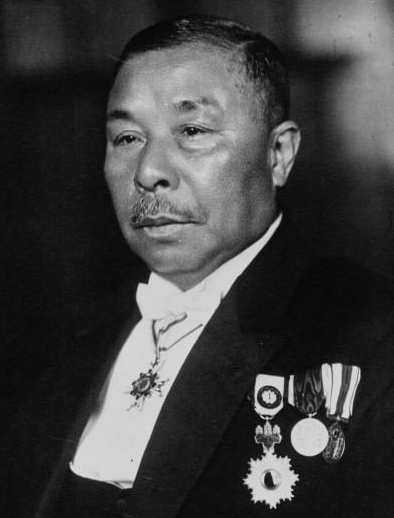
- Koizumi in 1930

Minister of Communications
- In office 2 July 1929 – 13 December 1931
- Prime Minister: Hamaguchi Osachi; Wakatsuki Reijirō
- Preceded by: Fusanosuke Kuhara
- Succeeded by: Chūzō Mitsuchi

Vice Speaker of the House of Representatives
- In office 26 June 1924 – 25 March 1927
- Speaker: Kasuya Gizo
- Preceded by: Genji Matsuda
- Succeeded by: Matsūra Gohē

Member of the House of Peers
- In office 19 December 1945 – 13 March 1946 Nominated by the Emperor

Member of the House of Representatives; from Kanagawa
- In office 16 May 1908 – 18 December 1945
- Preceded by: Katsushichi Takahashi
- Succeeded by: Constituency abolished
- Constituency: Counties district (1908–1920); 2nd district (1920–1928); 2nd district (1928–1945)

Personal details
- Born: 10 June 1865 Edo, Musashi, Japan
- Died: 24 September 1951 (aged 86) Tokyo, Japan
- Party: Imperial Rule Assistance Association
- Other political affiliations: Yūshinkai (1908–1910); Rikken Kokumintō (1910–1913); Rikken Dōshikai (1913–1916); Kenseikai (1916–1927); Rikken Minseitō (1927–1937)
- Relatives: Koizumi family
- A: Single-member district B: Multi-member district

Koizumi Matajirō (小泉 又次郎; 10 June 1865 – 24 September 1951) was a Japanese politician and cabinet minister in the Taishō period and early Shōwa period Japan. He was the grandfather of Junichiro Koizumi, who served as the Prime Minister of Japan from 2001 to 2006. He was the great-grandfather of the Minister of Defense of Japan Shinjirou Koizumi.

== Biography ==
Koizumi was born in Mutsuura, Musashi Province (part of present-day Kanazawa-ku, Yokohama) to Koizumi Yoshibe, a scaffolder, and his wife Yuki. He moved to nearby Yokosuka, Kanagawa with his parents, where his father worked as a procurer of day laborers, carpenters, steeplejacks and materials for the Yokosuka Naval Arsenal. The young Koizumi grew up in a rough environment. In 1878, after graduating from the predecessor of Yokosuka Elementary School, he tried to enlist in a preparatory school for Imperial Japanese Navy officer candidates, but was returned home when it was discovered he was underage and did not have his father’s permission. He attempted the same again in 1880 to a preparatory school for the Imperial Japanese Army. On the death of his elder brother, he was forced to inherit his father’s business and around this time obtained a large tattoo of a red dragon which covered most of his back and upper arms, and was addressed as “boss” by his fellow steeplejacks. He also became a member of the Rikken Kaishintō in 1887 and around this time married Ayabe Nao, a 30-year-old geisha. In 1907, Koizumi fathered his only child, Yoshie, with Ishikawa Hatsu, one of his mistresses. Koizumi’s daughter gave birth in 1942 to a son, Junichirō, who later became Prime Minister.

In 1889, Koizumi became a reporter for the Mainichi Shimbun, and in 1903 was elected to the Kanagawa Prefectural Assembly. Vocal in support of ultranationalist causes, he participated in the Hibiya Incendiary Incident in protest of the Treaty of Portsmouth in 1905. In 1907, Koizumi was elected to the Yokosuka city assembly, and in the 1908 General Election successfully ran for a seat in the lower house of the Diet of Japan. He was reelected 12 consecutive times, holding his seat of 38 years until the end of World War II. He rose to the post of secretary-general of the Kenseikai and was a leader in the movement towards universal suffrage, leading mass rallies in Tokyo. In 1924, he became Vice-Chairman of the House and also served as secretary-general of the Rikken Minseitō from 1928-1929 and 1937-1938.

In 1929, Koizumi was appointed Communications Minister in the Hamaguchi Cabinet and the Second Wakatsuki Cabinet. During this time, he was nicknamed the "wild man" or "irezumi minister", from his flamboyant speeches. As minister, he unsuccessfully sought to privatize the Japanese postal system.

In 1942, Koizumi became mayor of Yokosuka. In 1937, he joined the Imperial Rule Assistance Association and was appointed deputy chairman of the Imperial Rule Assistance Political Association. In 1944, he was an advisor to Prime Minister Kuniaki Koiso. He was selected to be a member of the House of Peers, but in 1946, under the occupation of Japan, he was purged from public office. He died in 1951.

== Legacy ==
Koizumi's son-in-law, Jun'ya Koizumi, became a director general of the Japan Defense Agency and a second-generation member of the Diet of Japan. Koizumi's grandson, Jun'ichirō Koizumi, served as the Prime Minister of Japan from 2001 to 2006 and inherited his grandfather's idea of postal privatization; Jun'ichirō had himself been Minister of Posts and Telecommunications from 1992 to 1993 under Prime Minister Kiichi Miyazawa.

== See also ==
- Koizumi family

Political offices
Preceded by Fusanosuke Kuhara	Minister of Communications; 2 July 1929 – 13 December 1931	Succeeded by Chūzō Mitsuji
