= Minister of Defense (Japan) =

Japanese cabinet role

- 防衛大臣
- Standard of the Minister of Defense

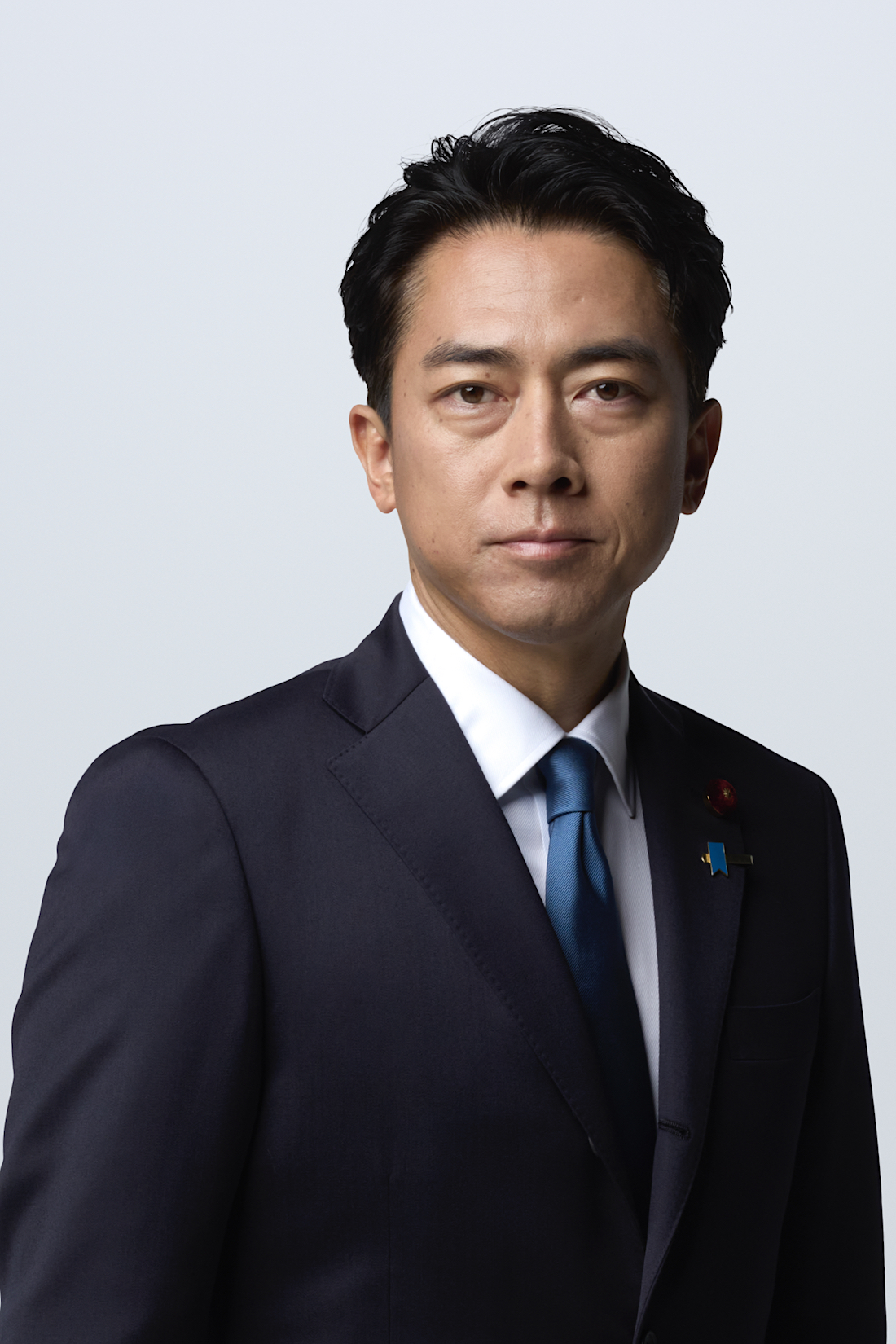
- Incumbent; Shinjirō Koizumi since 21 October 2025
- Ministry of Defense
- Style: His Excellency
- Member of: Cabinet; National Security Council; National Intelligence Council; Defense Council
- Reports to: The Prime Minister
- Appointer: The Prime Minister subject to formal attestation by the Emperor
- Precursor: Director General of the Defense Agency
- Formation: 9 January 2007; 19 years ago
- First holder: Fumio Kyuma
- Deputy: State Minister of Defense
- Salary: ¥20,916,000

The Minister of Defense (防衛大臣, Bōei Daijin), or Bōei-shō (防衛相), is a member of the Japanese cabinet and is the leader of the Ministry of Defense, the executive department of the Japanese Armed Forces. The minister of defense's position of command and authority over the military is second only to that of the Prime Minister of Japan, who is the commander-in-chief.

The minister of defense is appointed by the Prime Minister and is a member of the National Security Council and the National Intelligence Council. The current Minister of Defense is Shinjirō Koizumi, who took office on October 21, 2025.

== History ==
On 26 December 2007, the Government of Japan made the decision to reform its Defense Agency to the Ministry of Defense in the expectation to have a far-reaching effect on Japan's future military development. The defense policy that has been pursued by Japan is based on the "Basic Policy for National Defense", which was adopted by the Cabinet in May 1957. Japan's main goal of national defense is the prevention of indirect as well as direct aggression from outside enemies.

The Japanese government reformed the Defense Agency to the Ministry of Defense with a ceremony that was attended by then Prime Minister Shinzō Abe and the then-new Minister of Defense Fumio Kyuma. The creation of the Ministry of Defense was in conjunction with Prime Minister Shinzō Abe's continued efforts to ensure a stronger image of the Japan Self-Defense Forces (JSDF). The bill in which to upgrade the Defense Agency to the Ministry of Defense was approved by the House of Representatives (lower house) in November 2006, and the House of Councillors (upper house) in mid-December 2006. Minister Kyuma personally attended a session in the House of Councillors and gave a speech after the bill was approved.

On 11 September 2019, Taro Kono became the first high-profile 'prime minister-ready' politician to head the Ministry of Defense. He has the strongest LDP factional backing of any defense minister thus far. His social media following is second only to Prime Minister Shinzo Abe. He's a leading candidate for post-Abe premiership. Kono previously held the prominent role of foreign minister.

== Chain of command ==
1. Prime Minister
2. Minister of Defense
3. Chief of Staff, Joint Staff

=== Structure ===
The Commander-in-Chief of the Japan Self-Defense Forces (JSDF), who does not formally constitute a uniformed military, is the Prime Minister. The Emperor of Japan is a constitutional monarch who does not have political or military authority over the JSDF; that authority rests with the Prime Minister. However, the Emperor formally appoints the Prime Minister to office. The Minister of Defense is responsible for the organization and formulating the national security policy. The budget request is drafted by the Ministry of Finance and making its own legislative proposals to the National Diet.

The Minister of Defense is advised on every concern related to the duties of the Japan Self-Defense Forces by the Chief of Staff, Joint Staff.

== List of ministers of defense (2007–present) ==
LDP
DPJ
Independent

Minister of Defense			Term of office			Prime Minister
#	Portrait	Name	Took office	Left office	Time in office	Prime Minister
1		Fumio Kyuma	January 9, 2007	July 4, 2007	176 days	Shinzō Abe
2		Yuriko Koike	July 4, 2007	August 27, 2007	54 days	Shinzō Abe
3		Masahiko Kōmura	August 27, 2007	September 26, 2007	30 days	Shinzō Abe
4		Shigeru Ishiba	September 26, 2007	August 2, 2008	311 days	Yasuo Fukuda
5		Yoshimasa Hayashi	August 2, 2008	September 24, 2008	53 days	Yasuo Fukuda
6		Yasukazu Hamada	September 24, 2008	September 16, 2009	357 days	Taro Aso
7		Toshimi Kitazawa	September 16, 2009	September 2, 2011	1 year, 351 days	Yukio Hatoyama
7		Toshimi Kitazawa	September 16, 2009	September 2, 2011	1 year, 351 days	Naoto Kan
8		Yasuo Ichikawa	September 2, 2011	January 13, 2012	133 days	Yoshihiko Noda
9		Naoki Tanaka	January 13, 2012	June 4, 2012	143 days	Yoshihiko Noda
10		Satoshi Morimoto	June 4, 2012	December 26, 2012	205 days	Yoshihiko Noda
11		Itsunori Onodera	December 26, 2012	September 3, 2014	1 year, 251 days	Shinzō Abe
12		Akinori Eto	September 3, 2014	December 24, 2014	112 days	Shinzō Abe
13		Gen Nakatani	December 24, 2014	August 3, 2016	1 year, 223 days	Shinzō Abe
14		Tomomi Inada	August 3, 2016	July 28, 2017	359 days	Shinzō Abe
–		Fumio Kishida (Acting)	July 28, 2017	August 3, 2017	6 days	Shinzō Abe
15 (11)		Itsunori Onodera	August 3, 2017	October 2, 2018	1 year, 60 days	Shinzō Abe
16		Takeshi Iwaya	October 2, 2018	September 11, 2019	344 days	Shinzō Abe
17		Taro Kono	September 11, 2019	September 16, 2020	1 year, 5 days	Shinzō Abe
18		Nobuo Kishi	September 16, 2020	August 10, 2022	1 year, 328 days	Yoshihide Suga
18		Nobuo Kishi	September 16, 2020	August 10, 2022	1 year, 328 days	Fumio Kishida
19 (6)		Yasukazu Hamada	August 10, 2022	September 13, 2023	1 year, 34 days	Fumio Kishida
20		Minoru Kihara	September 13, 2023	October 1, 2024	1 year, 18 days	Fumio Kishida
21 (13)		Gen Nakatani	October 1, 2024	October 21, 2025	1 year, 341 days	Shigeru Ishiba
22		Shinjirō Koizumi	October 21, 2025	Incumbent	321 days	Sanae Takaichi

== Allied occupation of Japan ==
Following the end of World War II, the Armed Forces of the Empire of Japan were disbanded and US forces took control. From 1950 to 1952, the National Police Reserve led by Minister of State Takeo Ōhashi was formed. It was renamed as the National Safety Force in 1952. In 1952, the Coastal Safety Force, the waterborne counterpart of the National Police Reserve, was founded and led by the Commissioner of the Coastal Safety Force (保安庁長官) Tokutarō Kimura.

== Directors general of the Defense Agency ==
These are the directors general of the Defense Agency. It is the predecessor of the Ministry of Defense which was established on 9 January 2007.

- Tokutarō Kimura 1954
- Seiichi Ōmura 1954–1955
- Arata Sugihara 1955
- Shigemasa Sunada 1955
- Funada Naka 1955–1956
- Tanzan Ishibashi 1956–1957
- Nobusuke Kishi 1957
- Akira Kodaki 1957
- Juichi Tsushima 1957–1958
- Gisen Satō 1958–1959
- Shigejirō Inō 1959
- Munenori Akagi 1959–1960
- Masumi Esaki 1960
- Naomi Nishimura 1960
- Sensuke Fujieda 1961–1962
- Kenjirō Shiga 1962–1963
- Fukuda Tokuyasu 1963–1964
- Jun'ya Koizumi 1964–1965
- Raizo Matsuno 1965–1966
- Eikichi Kanbayashiyama 1966
- Kaneshichi Masuda 1966–1968
- Kiichi Arita 1968–1970
- Yasuhiro Nakasone 1970–1971
- Keiichi Masuhara 1971
- Naomi Nishimura 1971
- Ezaki Masumi 1971–1972
- Keiichi Masuhara 1972–1973
- Yamanaka Yasunori 1973–1974
- Sōsuke Uno 1974
- Michita Sakata 1974–1976
- Asao Mihara 1976–1977
- Shin Kanemaru 1977–1978
- Ganri Yamashita 1978–1979
- Enji Kubota 1979–1980
- Yoshizo Hosoda 1980
- Koji Omura 1980–1981
- Soichiro Ito 1981–1982
- Kazuho Tanigawa 1982–1983
- Kurihara Yoshiyuki 1983–1984
- Koichi Kato 1984–1986
- Kurihara Yoshiyuki 1986–1987
- Tsutomu Kawara 1987–1988
- Kichirō Tazawa 1988–1989
- Taku Yamasaki 1989
- Jūrō Matsumoto 1989–1990
- Yozo Ishikawa 1990
- Yukihiko Ikeda 1990–1991
- Sohei Miyashita 1991–1992
- Toshio Nakayama 1992–1993
- Nakanishi Keisuke 1993
- Kazuo Aichi 1993–1994
- Atsushi Kanda 1994
- Tokuichiro Tamazawa 1994–1995
- Seishirō Etō 1995–1996
- Hideo Usui 1996
- Fumio Kyūma 1996–1998
- Fukushiro Nukaga 1998
- Hosei Norota 1998–1999
- Riki Kawara 1999–2000
- Kazuo Torashima 2000
- Toshitsugu Saito 2000–2001
- Gen Nakatani 2001–2002
- Shigeru Ishiba 2002–2004
- Yoshinori Ohno 2004–2005
- Fukushiro Nukaga 2005–2006
- Fumio Kyūma 2006–2007

== Ministers with military experience ==
Although Article 68 of the Constitution states that all members of the Cabinet must be civilians, former military persons may be appointed Minister of Defense.

- Raizo Matsuno - served in the Imperial Japanese Navy during World War II and rose to rank of Lieutenant commander
- Yasuhiro Nakasone - served in the Imperial Japanese Navy during World War II and rose to rank of Lieutenant commander and worked as Paymaster
- Sōsuke Uno - served in the Imperial Japanese Army during World War II and rose to rank of Second Lieutenant
- Soichiro Ito - served in the Imperial Japanese Army during World War II and rose to rank of Second Lieutenant
- Shin Kanemaru - served briefly in the Kwantung Army as Sergeant in 1937-1938 and was discharged due to illness
- Satoshi Morimoto - served in Japan Air Self-Defense Force and rose to rank as Major
- Gen Nakatani - served in Japan Ground Self-Defense Force as platoon leader and instructor with rank of Lieutenant

== See also ==
Previous positions that covered the role of the Minister of Defense:

- Ministers of the Army of Japan - created in 1885 (Ministry existed since 1872) to administer the Imperial Japanese Army and abolished in 1945
- Ministers of the Navy of Japan - created in 1885 (Ministry existed since 1872) to administer the Imperial Japanese Navy and abolished in 1945
- There was no Ministry or Minister of Air Force rather the navy and army had their own separate bureaux:
  - Imperial Japanese Naval Aviation Bureau was led by a Commander
    - Vice Admiral Eikichi Katagiri served in 1941–1945
  - Imperial Japanese Army Air Service
- Minister of War - created in 683 as Hyōseikan to administer military affairs, renamed as Hyōbu-shō in 702 and lasted to 1872; Ministers were either son or relative of the Emperor
