= Jun'ya Koizumi =

Japanese politician

- 小泉 純也
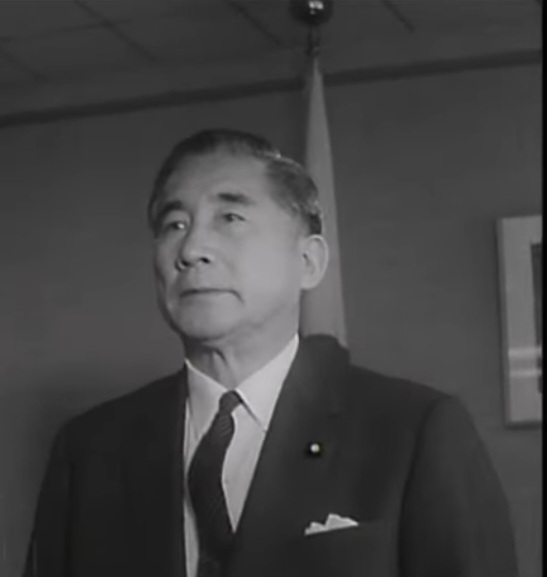
- Koizumi in 1964

Director-General of the Japan Defense Agency
- In office 18 July 1964 – 3 June 1965
- Prime Minister: Hayato Ikeda; Eisaku Satō
- Preceded by: Fukuda Tokuyasu
- Succeeded by: Raizo Matsuno

Member of the House of Representatives
- In office 2 October 1952 – 10 August 1969
- Preceded by: Sakichi Shirai
- Succeeded by: Makiyoshi Matsuo
- Constituency: Kanagawa 2nd
- In office 1 May 1937 – 18 December 1945
- Preceded by: Kaju Nakamura
- Succeeded by: Constituency abolished
- Constituency: Kagoshima 1st

Personal details
- Born: Junya Samejima; 24 January 1904 Kaseda, Kagoshima, Japan
- Died: 10 August 1969 (aged 65)
- Party: Liberal Democratic
- Other political affiliations: CDP (1937–1940); IRAA (1940–1945); JPP (1945–1946); Kaishintō (1952–1954); JDP (1954–1955)
- Spouse: Yoshie Koizumi
- Children: 6, including Junichiro
- Relatives: Koizumi family
- Education: Nihon University

Junya Koizumi (小泉 純也, Koizumi Jun'ya; né Samejima (鮫島), January 24, 1904 – August 10, 1969) was a Japanese politician who served as Director General of the Japan Defense Agency during the 1960s. He is the father of Prime Minister Junichiro Koizumi and the grandfather of Japan Defense Minister incumbent Shinjirou Koizumi.

== Life and career ==
Koizumi was born Junya Samejima (鮫島 純也, Samejima Jun'ya) in Higashi-Kaseda, Kagoshima Prefecture (now part of Minami-Satsuma); his family were fishermen. He attended high school at night while working in a department store, and then attended law classes at Nihon University while working as a secretary to a Diet member. He graduated in 1930 and joined the Rikken Minseitō political party. He was elected to the Diet in 1937.

He married Yoshie Koizumi, the daughter of Rikken Minseitō director and postal minister Matajirō Koizumi, taking her family name. Junya and Yoshie Koizumi had six children, including Jun'ichirō Koizumi, who later became the Prime Minister of Japan.

Koizumi was purged from politics by the Allied occupation government in the late 1940s, but returned to the Diet in 1952. He was a close ally of Nobusuke Kishi in the postwar years, served as Vice-Minister of Justice under Ichirō Hatoyama and became Director General of the Japan Defense Agency under Hayato Ikeda and Eisaku Satō.

== See also ==
- Koizumi family
