= Third Satō cabinet =

Cabinet of Japan (1970–1971)

Third Satō Cabinet
- 63rd Cabinet of Japan

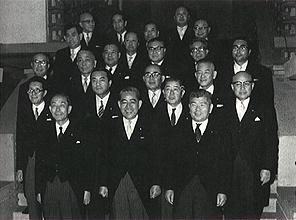
- Date formed: January 14, 1970
- Date dissolved: July 5, 1971

People and organisations
- Emperor: Shōwa
- Prime Minister: Eisaku Satō
- Member party: Liberal Democratic Party
- Status in legislature: Majority (Lower House)
- Opposition parties: Japan Socialist Party; Kōmeitō; Democratic Socialist Party; Japanese Communist Party

History
- Election: 1971 Councillors election
- Predecessor: Second Satō Cabinet
- Successor: Third Satō Cabinet (Reshuffle)

The Third Satō Cabinet is the 63rd Cabinet of Japan headed by Eisaku Satō from January 14, 1970, to July 7, 1972.

== Cabinet ==
- Prime Minister - Eisaku Sato
- Minister of Justice
  - Takeji Kobayashi (Member of the House of Councilors): January 14, 1970 - February 8, 1971
  - Daisuke Akita (Minister of Home Affairs): February 9–16, 1971
  - Koshiro Ueki: February 17 - July 5, 1971
- Minister for Foreign Affairs - Kiichi Aichi
- Minister of Finance - Takeo Fukuda
- Minister of Education - Michita Sakata
- Minister of Health and Welfare - Tsuneo Uchida
- Minister of Agriculture, Forestry and Forestry - Tadao Kuraishi
- Minister of International Trade and Industry - Kiichi Miyazawa
- Minister of Transport - Tomisaburo Hashimoto
- Minister of Posts and Telecommunications - Ide Ichitaro
- Minister of Labor - Masakatsu Nohara
- Minister of Construction, Director of the Kinki Regional Development Agency, Director of the Chubu Regional Development and Maintenance Agency, Chair of the National Capital Region Development Commission - Ryutaro Nemoto
- Minister of Home Affairs - Daisuke Akita
- Chief Cabinet Secretary - Shigeru Mori
- Director-General of the Prime Minister's Office - Sadanori Yamanaka
- Chair of the National Public Safety Commission, Director of the Administrative Management Agency - Araki Masuo
- Director of the Hokkaido Regional Development Agency, Director of the Science and Technology Agency - Shinichi Nishida (Member of the House of Councilors)
- Director of the Defense Agency - Yasuhiro Nakasone
- Director-General of the Economic Planning Agency - Ichiro Sato (Member of the House of Councilors)
- Director-General of the Environment Agency - Sadanori Yamanaka (Director-General of the Prime Minister's Office): Established on July 1, 1971
  - Director-General of the Cabinet Legislation Bureau - Masami Takatsuji
  - Deputy Chief Cabinet Secretary (Political Affairs) - Toshio Kimura
  - Deputy Chief Cabinet Secretary (General Affairs) - Mitsu Ishioka
  - Deputy Chief Cabinet Secretary for the Prime Minister's Office (Political Affairs) - Tetsuro Minato: January 20, 1970 - July 5, 1971
  - Deputy Chief Cabinet Secretary for the Prime Minister's Office (General Affairs)
    - Norio Iwakura: January 16, 1970 - January 8, 1971
    - Renpei Kuriyama: January 8 - July 5, 1971

== Reshuffled Cabinet ==
Third Satō Cabinet (Reshuffle)
- 63rd Cabinet of Japan

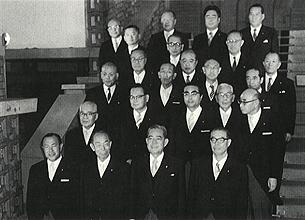
- Date formed: July 5, 1971
- Date dissolved: July 7, 1972

People and organisations
- Emperor: Shōwa
- Prime Minister: Eisaku Satō
- Member party: Liberal Democratic Party
- Status in legislature: Majority (Lower House)
- Opposition parties: Japan Socialist Party; Kōmeitō; Democratic Socialist Party; Japanese Communist Party

History
- Predecessor: Third Satō Cabinet
- Successor: First Kakuei Tanaka Cabinet

The Cabinet reshuffle took place on July 5, 1971.

- Prime Minister - Eisaku Sato
- Minister of Justice - Shigezaburo Maeo
- Minister for Foreign Affairs - Takeo Fukuda
- Minister of Finance - Mikio Mizuta
- Minister of Education - Saburo Takami
- Minister of Health and Welfare - Noboru Saito (Member of the House of Councilors)
- Minister of Agriculture, Forestry and Forestry - Munetori Akagi
- Minister of International Trade and Industry - Kakuei Tanaka
- Minister of Transport - Kyoshirō Niwa
- Minister of Posts and Telecommunications - Masao Hirose
- Minister of Labor
  - Kensaburo Hara: July 5, 1971 - January 27, 1972
  - Toshiro Tsukahara: January 28 - July 7, 1972
- Minister of Construction, Director of the Kinki Regional Development Agency, Director of the Chubu Regional Development and Maintenance Agency, Chair of the National Capital Region Development Commission - Eiichi Nishimura
- Minister of Home Affairs, Director of the Hokkaido Regional Development Agency - Motosaburo Watami
- Chief Cabinet Secretary - Noboru Takeshita
- Director-General of the Prime Minister's Office - Sadanori Yamanaka
- Chair of the National Public Safety Commission, Chief of the Administrative Management Agency - Torata Nakamura
- Director of the Defense Agency
  - Keikichi Masuhara (Member of the House of Councilors): July 5 - August 1, 1971
  - Naoki Nishimura: August 2, 1971 - December 5, 1971
  - Masumi Esaki: December 6, 1971 - July 7, 1972
- Director-General of the Economic Planning Agency - Toshio Kimura
- Director of the Science and Technology Agency
  - Wataru Hiraizumi (Member of the House of Councilors): July 5 - November 15, 1971
  - Shiro Kiuchi (Member of the House of Councilors): November 16, 1971 - July 7, 1972
- Director of the Environment Agency - Takeichi Oishi
- Director of the Okinawa Regional Development Agency - Sadanori Yamanaka (Concurrently serving as the Director-General of the Prime Minister's Office): Established on May 15, 1972
  - Director-General of the Cabinet Legislation Bureau - Masami Takatsuji
  - Deputy Chief Cabinet Secretary (Political Affairs) - Asao Mihara
  - Deputy Chief Cabinet Secretary (General Affairs) - Kinichi Koike
  - Deputy Chief Cabinet Secretary for the Prime Minister's Office (Political Affairs) - Shigetami Sunada: July 9, 1971 - July 7, 1972
  - Deputy Chief Cabinet Secretary for the Prime Minister's Office (General Affairs) - Renpei Kuriyama
