= Second Tanaka cabinet =

Cabinet of Japan (1972–1974)

Second Kakuei Tanaka Cabinet
- 65th Cabinet of Japan
- December 1972–1973
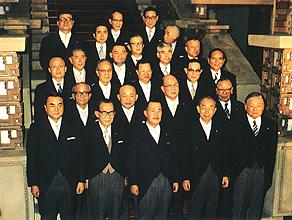
- Date formed: December 22, 1972
- Date dissolved: November 25, 1973

People and organisations
- Emperor: Shōwa
- Prime Minister: Kakuei Tanaka
- Member party: Liberal Democratic Party
- Status in legislature: Majority (Lower House)
- Opposition parties: Japan Socialist Party; Kōmeitō; Democratic Socialist Party; Japanese Communist Party

History
- Predecessor: First Kakuei Tanaka Cabinet
- Successor: Second Kakuei Tanaka Cabinet (First Reshuffle)

The Second Kakuei Tanaka Cabinet is the 65th Cabinet of Japan headed by Kakuei Tanaka from December 22, 1972 to December 9, 1974.

== Cabinet ==
Portfolio	Minister	Term start	Term end
Prime Minister	Kakuei Tanaka	December 22, 1972	November 25, 1973
Deputy Prime Minister; Minister of State; Director of the Environment Agency	Takeo Miki	December 22, 1972	November 25, 1973
Minister of Justice	Isaji Tanaka	December 22, 1972	November 25, 1973
Minister for Foreign Affairs	Masayoshi Ōhira	December 22, 1972	November 25, 1973
Minister of Finance	Kiichi Aichi	December 22, 1972	November 23, 1973
Minister of Finance	Kakuei Tanaka	November 23, 1973	November 25, 1973
Minister of Education	Seisuke Okuno	December 22, 1972	November 25, 1973
Minister of Health	Kunikichi Saitō	December 22, 1972	November 25, 1973
Minister of Agriculture, Forestry and Fisheries	Yoshio Sakurauchi	December 22, 1972	November 25, 1973
Minister of International Trade and Industry	Yasuhiro Nakasone	December 22, 1972	November 25, 1973
Minister of Transport	Torasaburō Shintani	December 22, 1972	November 25, 1973
Minister of Posts	Chūji Kuno	December 22, 1972	November 25, 1973
Minister of Labor	Tsunetarō Katō	December 22, 1972	November 25, 1973
Minister of Construction; Director of the Kinki Regional Development Agency; Director of the Chubu Regional Development and Maintenance Agency; Chair of the National Capital Region Development Commission	Shin Kanemaru	December 22, 1972	November 25, 1973
Minister of Home Affairs; Chair of the National Public Safety Commission; Director of the Hokkaido Regional Development Agency	Masumi Esaki	December 22, 1972	November 25, 1973
Chief Cabinet Secretary	Susumu Nikaidō	December 22, 1972	November 25, 1973
Director-General of the Prime Minister's Office; Director of the Okinawa Development Agency Development	Shinzō Tsubokawa	December 22, 1972	November 25, 1973
Director of the Administrative Management Agency	Takeo Fukuda	December 22, 1972	November 25, 1973
Director of the Defense Agency	Keikichi Masuhara	December 22, 1972	May 29, 1973
Director of the Defense Agency	Sadanori Yamanaka	May 29, 1973	November 25, 1973
Director of the Economic Planning Agency	Zentarō Kosaka	December 22, 1972	November 25, 1973
Director of the Science and Technology Agency	Kazuo Maeda	December 22, 1972	November 25, 1973
Director-General of the Cabinet Legislation Bureau	Ichiro Yoshikuni	December 22, 1972	November 25, 1973
Deputy Chief Cabinet Secretary (Political Affairs)	Ganri Yamashita	December 22, 1972	November 25, 1973
Deputy Chief Cabinet Secretary (General Affairs)	Masaharu Gotōda	December 22, 1972	November 25, 1973
Deputy Director-General of the Prime Minister's Office (Political Affairs)	Jūshirō Komiyama	December 22, 1972	November 25, 1973
Deputy Director-General of the Prime Minister's Office (General Affairs)	Kiyofumi Miyazaki	December 22, 1972	November 25, 1973

== First Reshuffled Cabinet ==
Second Kakuei Tanaka Cabinet (First Reshuffle)
- 65th Cabinet of Japan
- 1973–November 1974
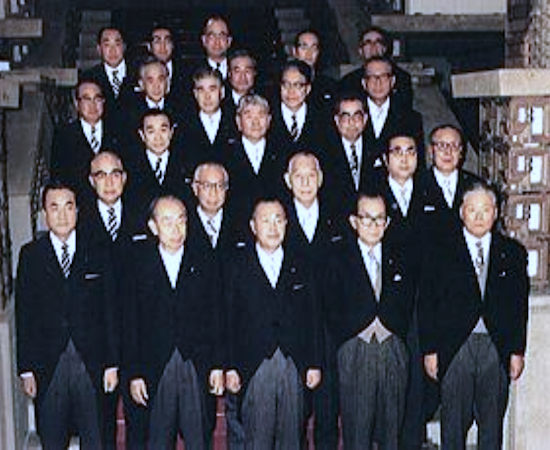
- Date formed: November 25, 1973
- Date dissolved: November 11, 1974

People and organisations
- Emperor: Shōwa
- Prime Minister: Kakuei Tanaka
- Member party: Liberal Democratic Party
- Status in legislature: Majority (Lower House)
- Opposition parties: Japan Socialist Party; Kōmeitō; Democratic Socialist Party; Japanese Communist Party

History
- Election: 10th Councillors election (1974)
- Predecessor: Second Tanaka Cabinet
- Successor: Second Tanaka Cabinet (Second Reshuffle)

The first Cabinet reshuffle took place on November 25, 1973.

Portfolio	Minister	Term start	Term end
Prime Minister	Kakuei Tanaka	November 25, 1973	November 11, 1974
Deputy Prime Minister; Minister of State	Takeo Miki	November 25, 1973	July 12, 1974
Minister of Justice	Umekichi Nakamura	November 25, 1973	November 11, 1974
Minister for Foreign Affairs	Masayoshi Ōhira	November 25, 1973	July 16, 1974
Minister for Foreign Affairs	Toshio Kimura	July 16, 1974	November 11, 1974
Minister of Finance	Takeo Fukuda	November 25, 1973	July 16, 1974
Minister of Finance	Masayoshi Ōhira	July 16, 1974	November 11, 1974
Minister of Education	Seisuke Okuno	November 25, 1973	November 11, 1974
Minister of Health	Kunikichi Saitō	November 25, 1973	November 11, 1974
Minister of Agriculture, Forestry and Fisheries	Tadao Kuraishi	November 25, 1973	November 11, 1974
Minister of International Trade and Industry	Yasuhiro Nakasone	November 25, 1973	November 11, 1974
Minister of Transport	Masatoshi Tokunaga	November 25, 1973	November 11, 1974
Minister of Posts	Ken Harada	November 25, 1973	November 11, 1974
Minister of Labor	Takashi Hasegawa	November 25, 1973	November 11, 1974
Minister of Construction	Takao Kameoka	November 25, 1973	November 11, 1974
Minister of Home Affairs; Chair of the National Public Safety Commission; Director of the Hokkaido Regional Development Agency	Kingo Machimura	November 25, 1973	November 11, 1974
Chief Cabinet Secretary	Susumu Nikaidō	November 25, 1973	November 11, 1974
Director-General of the Prime Minister's Office; Director of the Okinawa Development Agency Development	Tokusaburō Kosaka	November 25, 1973	November 11, 1974
Director of the Administrative Management Agency	Shigeru Hori	November 25, 1973	July 16, 1974
Director of the Administrative Management Agency	Kichizō Hosoda	July 16, 1974	November 11, 1974
Director of the Defense Agency	Sadanori Yamanaka	November 25, 1973	November 11, 1974
Director of the Economic Planning Agency	Tsuneo Uchida	November 25, 1973	November 11, 1974
Director of the Science and Technology Agency	Kinji Moriyama	November 25, 1973	November 11, 1974
Director of the Environment Agency	Takeo Miki	November 25, 1973	July 12, 1974
Director of the Environment Agency	Matsuhei Mōri	July 12, 1974	November 11, 1974
Minister of State	Eiichi Nishimura	June 24, 1974	June 25, 1974
Director of the Kinki Regional Development Agency; Director of the Chubu Regional Development and Maintenance Agency; Chair of the National Capital Region Development Commission	Takao Kameoka	November 25, 1973	June 26, 1974 (abolished)
Director of the National Land Agency	Eiichi Nishimura	June 26, 1974 (established)	November 11, 1974
Director-General of the Cabinet Legislation Bureau	Ichiro Yoshikuni	November 25, 1973	November 11, 1974
Deputy Chief Cabinet Secretary (Political Affairs)	Jōji Ōmura	November 25, 1973	November 11, 1974
Deputy Chief Cabinet Secretary (General Affairs)	Hiromori Kawashima	November 25, 1973	November 11, 1974
Deputy Director-General of the Prime Minister's Office (Political Affairs)	Keizō Obuchi	November 25, 1973	November 11, 1974
Deputy Director-General of the Prime Minister's Office (General Affairs)	Kiyofumi Miyazaki	November 25, 1973	November 11, 1974

== Second Reshuffled Cabinet ==
Second Kakuei Tanaka Cabinet (Second Reshuffle)
- 65th Cabinet of Japan
- November–December 1974
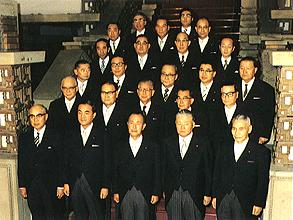
- Date formed: November 11, 1974
- Date dissolved: December 9, 1974

People and organisations
- Emperor: Shōwa
- Prime Minister: Kakuei Tanaka
- Member party: Liberal Democratic Party
- Status in legislature: Majority (Lower House)
- Opposition parties: Japan Socialist Party; Kōmeitō; Democratic Socialist Party; Japanese Communist Party

History
- Predecessor: Second Kakuei Tanaka Cabinet (First Reshuffle)
- Successor: Miki Cabinet

The second Cabinet reshuffle took place on November 11, 1974.

Portfolio	Minister	Term start	Term end
Prime Minister	Kakuei Tanaka	November 11, 1974	December 9, 1974
Minister of Justice	Seigo Hamano	November 11, 1974	December 9, 1974
Minister for Foreign Affairs	Toshio Kimura	November 11, 1974	December 9, 1974
Minister of Finance	Masayoshi Ōhira	November 11, 1974	December 9, 1974
Minister of Education	Asao Mihara	November 11, 1974	December 9, 1974
Minister of Health	Kenji Fukunaga	November 11, 1974	December 9, 1974
Minister of Agriculture, Forestry and Fisheries	Tadao Kuraishi	November 11, 1974	December 9, 1974
Minister of International Trade and Industry	Yasuhiro Nakasone	November 11, 1974	December 9, 1974
Minister of Transport	Akira Etō	November 11, 1974	December 9, 1974
Minister of Posts	Toshio Kashima	November 11, 1974	December 9, 1974
Minister of Labor	Takeo Ōkubo	November 11, 1974	December 9, 1974
Minister of Construction	Tatsuo Ozawa	November 11, 1974	December 9, 1974
Minister of Home Affairs; Chair of the National Public Safety Commission; Director of the Hokkaido Regional Development Agency	Hajime Fukuda	November 11, 1974	December 9, 1974
Chief Cabinet Secretary	Noboru Takeshita	November 11, 1974	December 9, 1974
Director-General of the Prime Minister's Office; Director of the Okinawa Development Agency Development	Tokusaburō Kosaka	November 11, 1974	December 9, 1974
Director of the Administrative Management Agency	Kichizō Hosoda	November 11, 1974	December 9, 1974
Director of the Defense Agency	Sōsuke Uno	November 11, 1974	December 9, 1974
Director of the Economic Planning Agency	Tadashi Kuranari	November 11, 1974	December 9, 1974
Director of the Science and Technology Agency	Tokurō Adachi	November 11, 1974	December 9, 1974
Director of the Environment Agency	Matsuhei Mōri	November 11, 1974	December 9, 1974
Director of the National Land Agency	Hyōsuke Niwa	November 11, 1974	December 9, 1974
Director-General of the Cabinet Legislation Bureau	Ichiro Yoshikuni	November 11, 1974	December 9, 1974
Deputy Chief Cabinet Secretary (Political Affairs)	Seiroku Kajiyama	November 15, 1974	December 9, 1974
Deputy Chief Cabinet Secretary (General Affairs)	Hiromori Kawashima	November 11, 1974	December 9, 1974
Deputy Director-General of the Prime Minister's Office (Political Affairs)	Osamu Takatori	November 15, 1974	December 9, 1974
Deputy Director-General of the Prime Minister's Office (General Affairs)	Michio Minakawa	November 11, 1974	December 9, 1974
