= Ōhira Cabinet =

Ōhira Cabinet may refer to:

- First Ōhira Cabinet, the Japanese majority government led by Masayoshi Ōhira from 1978 to 1979
- Second Ōhira Cabinet, the Japanese majority government led by Masayoshi Ōhira from 1979 to 1980
