= Toshihiro Kennoki =

Japanese politician

Tohishiro Kennoki
- 剱木 亨弘
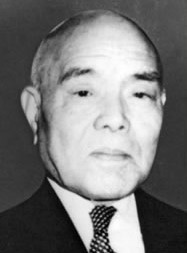
- Kennoki in 1966

Minister of Education
- In office 3 December 1966 – 25 November 1967
- Prime Minister: Eisaku Satō
- Preceded by: Kiichi Arita
- Succeeded by: Hirokichi Nadao

Deputy Chief Cabinet Secretary (Administrative affairs)
- In office 25 May 1951 – 30 October 1952
- Prime Minister: Shigeru Yoshida
- Preceded by: Seiichi Inoue
- Succeeded by: Mitoru Eguchi

Member of the House of Councillors
- In office 3 May 1953 – 3 July 1977
- Preceded by: Kanae Hatano
- Succeeded by: Masao Endō
- Constituency: Fukuoka at-large

Personal details
- Born: 3 September 1901 Ōtō, Fukuoka, Japan
- Died: 29 November 1992 (aged 91)
- Party: Liberal Democratic
- Other political affiliations: Liberal (1953–1955)
- Education: Tokyo Imperial University
- Awards: Order of the Rising Sun

Toshihiro Kennoki (Japanese: 剱木亨弘; 3 September 1901 - 29 November 1992) was a Japanese politician who served as Minister of Education under Prime Minister Eisaku Satō from 1966 to 1967.

Kennoki was an official in the Ministry of Education and rose to the position of vice minister. He also served as Deputy Chief Cabinet Secretary under Prime Minister Shigeru Yoshida. He was elected to the House of Councilors in 1953 and was active as an expert in education policy. As minister of education under Satō he is credited for having been one of the central figures who helped drive the Central Council for Education to consider education reform.

== Career ==
Born in Fukuoka Prefecture, Kennoki originally rose to prominence as a bureaucrat within the Ministry of Education, Science, Sports and Culture. He was interested in the field of primary education and education reform in general, and held the positions of Director of the Higher Education and Science Bureau within the Ministry and Vice Minister of Education.

Kennoki resigned as vice minister in early 1951 to run for Governor of Fukuoka Prefecture, but was defeated. Prime Minister Shigeru Yoshida appointed him Deputy Chief Cabinet Secretary for administrative affairs in May of the same year. In 1952 he was reappointed vice minister of Education, before resigning to run in the 1953 House of Councillors election.

Kennoki was elected to the House of Councilors in 1953 with the goal of promoting education reform within the Liberal Party. He was among a wave of more progressively-minded members of the National Diet, along with later Minister of Education Michita Sakata, that wanted to prioritize "policy over politics" when it came to education.

Right around the beginning of 1967, 20 years after the post-war Japanese education system was introduced, Kennoki was chosen as Minister of Education to try and reevaluate the educational system. Kennoki had, beforehand, criticized the American system being imposed on Japan, describing it as a "trick" (karakuri) and blaming the education system on a conspiracy. He believed that:

The Mission [referring to the United States Education Mission to Japan] was, I think, a clever ploy of the American Occupation policy. They organized a plan by which education matters were dealt with by a mission of educators and not by military officers, and arranged for the Japanese Education Committee to cooperate with them in order to produce a report that would be voluntarily accepted by the Japanese side.

In July 1967, Kennoki requested for the Central Council for Education to look into the entire education system and provide new guidelines for it. This request kicked off an investigation into the education system that would result in the Council's publishing of radical new guidelines in 1971, something that would define Japanese educational policy decades on. Kennoki recalled that the request was made by his own volition, and that he remembers that he only had one other LDP member look over it.

In October 1967, Kennoki declared a militant strike by Nikkyoso (the Japanese teachers' union) over low wages imposed by the Satō government to be illegal, stating that he would only meet with the striking teachers if they renounced their Code of Ethics and did not use force to try and influence government policy.

Preceded by Kiichi Arita	Minister of Education; 1966–1967	Succeeded by Hirokichi Nadao
Preceded by Seiichi Inoue	Deputy Chief Cabinet Secretary (Administrative affairs); 1951–1952	Succeeded by Mitoru Eguchi
