= Kakuei Tanaka Cabinet =

Kakuei Tanaka Cabinet may refer to:

- First Tanaka Cabinet, the Japanese majority government led by Kakuei Tanaka in 1972
- Second Tanaka Cabinet, the Japanese majority government led by Kakuei Tanaka from 1972 to 1974
