= Tanaka Cabinet =

Tanaka Cabinet may refer to:

- Tanaka Giichi Cabinet, the Japanese government led by Tanaka Giichi from 1927 to 1929
- First Tanaka Cabinet, the Japanese majority government led by Kakuei Tanaka in 1972
- Second Tanaka Cabinet, the Japanese majority government led by Kakuei Tanaka from 1972 to 1974
