= Ministry of Education, Science and Culture =

The Ministry of Education, Science and Culture can refer to:

- Ministry of Education, Science and Culture (Austria)
- Ministry of Education, Science and Culture (Iceland)
- Ministry of Education, Science and Culture (Japan)
- Ministry of Education, Culture and Science (Netherlands)

== See also ==
- Ministry of Education, Culture, Sports, Science and Technology (MEXT) of Japan, and the predecessor ministry Ministry of Education, Science, Sports and Culture (Monbusho)
