= Fukuda Cabinet =

Fukuda Cabinet may refer to:

- Takeo Fukuda Cabinet, the Japanese majority government led by Takeo Fukuda from 1976 to 1978
- Yasuo Fukuda Cabinet, the Japanese majority government led by Yasuo Fukuda from 2007 to 2008
