= Takeo Fukuda cabinet =

Cabinet of Japan (1976–1978)

Takeo Fukuda Cabinet
- 67th Cabinet of Japan

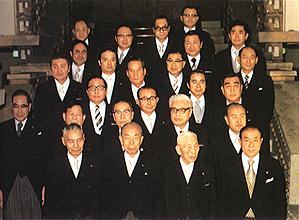
- Date formed: December 24, 1976
- Date dissolved: November 28, 1977

People and organisations
- Emperor: Shōwa
- Prime Minister: Takeo Fukuda
- Member party: Liberal Democratic Party
- Status in legislature: Majority government (Lower House)
- Opposition parties: Japan Socialist Party; Kōmeitō; Democratic Socialist Party; Japanese Communist Party

History
- Election: 11th Councillors election (1977)
- Predecessor: Miki Cabinet (Reshuffle)
- Successor: Takeo Fukuda Cabinet (Reshuffle)

The Takeo Fukuda Cabinet is the 67th Cabinet of Japan headed by Takeo Fukuda from December 24, 1976, to December 7, 1978.

== Cabinet ==
| Portfolio | Minister | Note |
|---|---|---|
| Prime Minister | Takeo Fukuda | |
| Minister of Justice | Hajime Fukuda | Resigned on October 4, 1977 |
| Minister of Justice | Mitsuo Setoyama | Appointed on October 5, 1977 |
| Minister for Foreign Affairs | Iichirō Hatoyama | |
| Minister of Finance | Hideo Bō | |
| Minister of Education | Toshiki Kaifu | |
| Minister of Health | Michio Watanabe | |
| Minister of Agriculture and Forestry | Zenkō Suzuki | |
| Minister of International Trade and Industry | Tanaka Tatsuo | |
| Minister of Transport | Hajime Tamura | |
| Minister of Posts | Jūshirō Komiyama | |
| Minister of Labor | Hirohide Ishida | |
| Minister of Construction | Shirō Hasegawa | |
| Minister of Home Affairs; Chair of the National Public Safety Commission; Director of the Hokkaido Regional Development Agency | Heiji Ogawa | |
| Chief Cabinet Secretary | Sunao Sonoda | |
| Director-General of the Prime Minister's Office; Director of the Okinawa Development Agency Development | Masaaki Fujita | |
| Director of the Administrative Management Agency | Eiichi Nishimura | |
| Director of the National Land Agency | Kichirō Tazawa | |
| Director of the Defense Agency | Asao Mihara | |
| Director of the Economic Planning Agency | Tadashi Kuranari | |
| Director of the Science and Technology Agency | Sōsuke Uno | |
| Director of the Environment Agency | Shintaro Ishihara | |
| Deputy Chief Cabinet Secretary | Masajuro Shiokawa | for Political Affairs |
| Deputy Chief Cabinet Secretary | Kunihiko Dōshō (Bureaucrat) | for General Affairs |
| Director-General of the Cabinet Legislation Bureau | Hideo Sanada (Bureaucrat) | |
| Deputy Chief Cabinet Secretary for the Prime Minister's Office | Keijirō Murata | for Political Affairs |
| Deputy Chief Cabinet Secretary for the Prime Minister's Office | Susumu Akiyama (Bureaucrat) | for General Affairs |

== Reshuffled Cabinet ==
Takeo Fukuda Cabinet (Reshuffle)
- 67th Cabinet of Japan

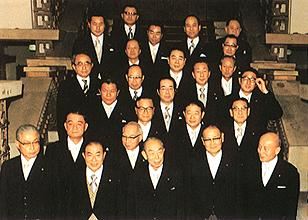
- Date formed: November 28, 1977
- Date dissolved: December 7, 1978

People and organisations
- Emperor: Shōwa
- Prime Minister: Takeo Fukuda
- Member party: Liberal Democratic Party
- Status in legislature: Majority government (Lower House)
- Opposition parties: Japan Socialist Party; Kōmeitō; Democratic Socialist Party; Japanese Communist Party

History
- Predecessor: Takeo Fukuda Cabinet
- Successor: First Ōhira Cabinet

The Cabinet reshuffle took place on November 28, 1977.

| Portfolio | Minister | Note |
|---|---|---|
| Prime Minister | Takeo Fukuda | |
| Minister of Justice | Mitsuo Setoyama | |
| Minister for Foreign Affairs | Sunao Sonoda | |
| Minister of Finance | Tatsuo Murayama | |
| Minister of Education | Shigetami Sunada | |
| Minister of Health | Tatsuo Ozawa | |
| Minister of Agriculture and Forestry | Ichiro Nakagawa | |
| Minister of Agriculture, Forestry and Fisheries | Ichiro Nakagawa | Renamed on July 5, 1978 |
| Minister of International Trade and Industry | Toshio Kōmoto | |
| Minister of Transport | Kenji Fukunaga | |
| Minister of Posts | Yasushi Hattori | |
| Minister of Labor | Katsushi Fujii | |
| Minister of Construction; Director of the National Land Agency | Yoshio Sakurauchi | |
| Minister of Home Affairs; Chair of the National Public Safety Commission; Director of the Hokkaido Regional Development Agency | Takenori Katō | |
| Chief Cabinet Secretary | Shintaro Abe | |
| Director-General of the Prime Minister's Office; Director of the Okinawa Development Agency Development | Sakonshirō Inamura | |
| Director of the Administrative Management Agency | Seijuro Arafune | |
| Director of the Defense Agency | Shin Kanemaru | |
| Director of the Economic Planning Agency | Kiichi Miyazawa | |
| Director of the Science and Technology Agency; Chair of the Atomic Energy Commission | Tasaburō Kumagai | |
| Director of the Environment Agency | Hisanari Yamada | |
| Minister of State for International Economy | Nobuhiko Ushiba (Non-member of the National Diet) | |
| Deputy Chief Cabinet Secretary | Yoshirō Mori | for Political Affairs |
| Deputy Chief Cabinet Secretary | Kunihiko Dōshō (Bureaucrat) | for General Affairs |
| Director-General of the Cabinet Legislation Bureau | Hideo Sanada (Bureaucrat) | |
| Deputy Chief Cabinet Secretary for the Prime Minister's Office | Michio Ochi | for Political Affairs |
| Deputy Chief Cabinet Secretary for the Prime Minister's Office | Susumu Akiyama (Bureaucrat) | for General Affairs; Resigned on April 7, 1978 |
| Deputy Chief Cabinet Secretary for the Prime Minister's Office | Kimimasa Akitomi (Bureaucrat) | for General Affairs; Appointed on April 7, 1978 |
