= Kiichi Arita =

Japanese politician

- 有田 喜一
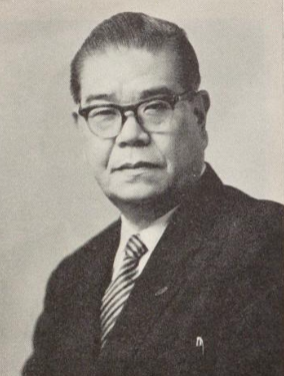
- Arita in 1967

Director-General of the Economic Planning Agency
- In office 12 July 1972 – 22 December 1972
- Prime Minister: Kakuei Tanaka
- Preceded by: Toshio Kimura; Kakuei Tanaka (acting)
- Succeeded by: Zentarō Kosaka

Director-General of the Japan Defense Agency
- In office 30 November 1968 – 14 January 1970
- Prime Minister: Eisaku Satō
- Preceded by: Kaneshichi Masuda
- Succeeded by: Yasuhiro Nakasone

Minister of Education
- In office 1 August 1966 – 3 December 1966
- Prime Minister: Eisaku Satō
- Preceded by: Umekichi Nakamura
- Succeeded by: Toshihiro Kennoki

Director-General of the Science and Technology Agency
- In office 1 August 1966 – 3 December 1966
- Prime Minister: Eisaku Satō
- Preceded by: Shōkichi Uehara
- Succeeded by: Susumu Nikaidō

Deputy Chief Cabinet Secretary
- In office 15 March 1948 – 15 October 1948 Serving with Shintarō Fukushima
- Prime Minister: Hitoshi Ashida
- Preceded by: Sueichi Takikawa; Eki Sone
- Succeeded by: Ryōgo Hashimoto; Yūichi Kōri

Member of the House of Representatives
- In office 20 November 1960 – 9 December 1976
- Preceded by: Morio Sasaki
- Succeeded by: Yōichi Tani
- Constituency: Hyōgo 5th
- In office 23 January 1949 – 25 April 1958
- Preceded by: Tetsuzo Kojima
- Succeeded by: Morio Sasaki
- Constituency: Hyōgo 5th

Personal details
- Born: 30 April 1901 Hikami, Hyōgo, Japan
- Died: 9 February 1986 (aged 84)
- Party: Liberal Democratic
- Other political affiliations: DP (1947–1950); NDP (1950–1952); Kaishintō (1952–1954); JDP (1954–1955)
- Education: Tokyo Imperial University

Kiichi Arita (Japanese: 有田 喜一; 30 April 1901 – 9 February 1986) was a Japanese politician. During his time in politics, he served as Director of the Economic Planning Agency, Director of the Defense Agency, and Minister of Education.

== Career ==
As Chairman of the Research Commission on National Security, Arita participated in the debate over the Treaty on the Non-Proliferation of Nuclear Weapons. The three pillars supporting the treaty were "non-proliferation, disarmament, and the right to peacefully use nuclear technology." Arita and his clique agreed with the first two, but did not like the third. However, Arita was willing to accept the treaty's pillars.

Arita was skeptical of the Chinese nuclear program, perceiving it as a direct "threat" and stating so in 1969. He thus called on Japan to increase its preparedness for a "worst-case scenario". This was before the change in the Defense Agency's perception of China to an indirect threat in early 1970 under Prime Minister Yasuhiro Nakasone. Arita was also the writer of the first Defense white paper in Japan in 1970 - his original draft argued for increased defense capability if there was ever a "delay" in assistance from the US in case of an invasion, but the final draft saw Arita back down on this, as he called for "autonomous defence capability" only, a controversial move.

Arita was one of the two supporters of Takeo Fukuda who were chosen to have a ministerial position under Prime Minister Kakuei Tanaka. Fukuda and his supporters were angered by the appointment of Tanaka as the successor of Satō, as Fukuda had previously been one of the top candidates for succeeding him. Upon his calling to the cabinet, then, Arita declined service in his position, citing the lack of representation for Fukuda supporters within the government. However, Tanaka convinced Fukuda to let his two supporters serve in their roles.
