= Hirokichi Nadao =

Japanese politician

- 灘尾 弘吉
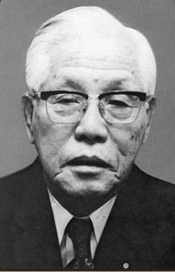

Speaker of the House of Representatives
- In office 1 February 1979 – 19 May 1980
- Monarch: Hirohito
- Deputy: Shōichi Miyake; Haruo Okada
- Preceded by: Shigeru Hori
- Succeeded by: Hajime Fukuda
Ministerial offices
Minister of Education
In office 25 November 1967 – 30 November 1968
Prime Minister	Eisaku Satō
Preceded by	Toshihiro Kennoki
Succeeded by	Michita Sakata
In office 18 July 1963 – 18 July 1964
Prime Minister	Eisaku Satō
Preceded by	Masuo Araki
Succeeded by	Kiichi Aichi
In office 12 June 1958 – 31 December 1958
Prime Minister	Nobusuke Kishi
Preceded by	Tou Matsunaga
Succeeded by	Ryogo Hashimoto
In office 23 December 1956 – 10 July 1957
Prime Minister	Tanzan Ishibashi; Nobusuke Kishi
Preceded by	Ichirō Kiyose
Succeeded by	Tou Matsunaga
Minister of Health and Welfare
In office 18 July 1961 – 18 July 1962
Prime Minister	Hayato Ikeda
Preceded by	Yoshimi Furui
Succeeded by	Eiichi Nishimura

Member of the House of Representatives
- In office 2 October 1952 – 27 November 1983
- Preceded by: Hisao Yamamoto
- Succeeded by: Yasuo Fukuoka
- Constituency: Hiroshima 1st

Governor of Ōita Prefecture
- In office 7 January 1941 – 15 June 1942
- Monarch: Hirohito
- Preceded by: Yazō Kōketsu
- Succeeded by: Itō Hisamatsu

Personal details
- Born: 21 December 1899 Ōgaki, Hiroshima, Japan
- Died: 22 January 1994 (aged 94) Setagaya, Tokyo, Japan
- Party: Liberal Democratic
- Other political affiliations: Liberal (1952–1955)
- Education: Tokyo Imperial University
- Awards: Junior Second Rank; Order of the Rising Sun, 1st Class (Order of the Paulownia Flowers)

Hirokichi Nadao (Japanese: 灘尾 弘吉; 21 December 1899 – 22 January 1994) was a Japanese politician. Throughout his career, he served as Minister of Education multiple times, Speaker of the House of Representatives, Minister of Health and Welfare, and Governor of Oita Prefecture.

Nadao was known for his hawkish attitudes. He held an aggressive stance towards Nikkyoso, the teachers' union of Japan, and unions in general (represented by Sōhyō). He was also one of the main people behind Prime Minister Eisaku Satō's foreign policy. In the mid-1970s, he was regarded as one of the most powerful men in Japan.

== Career ==
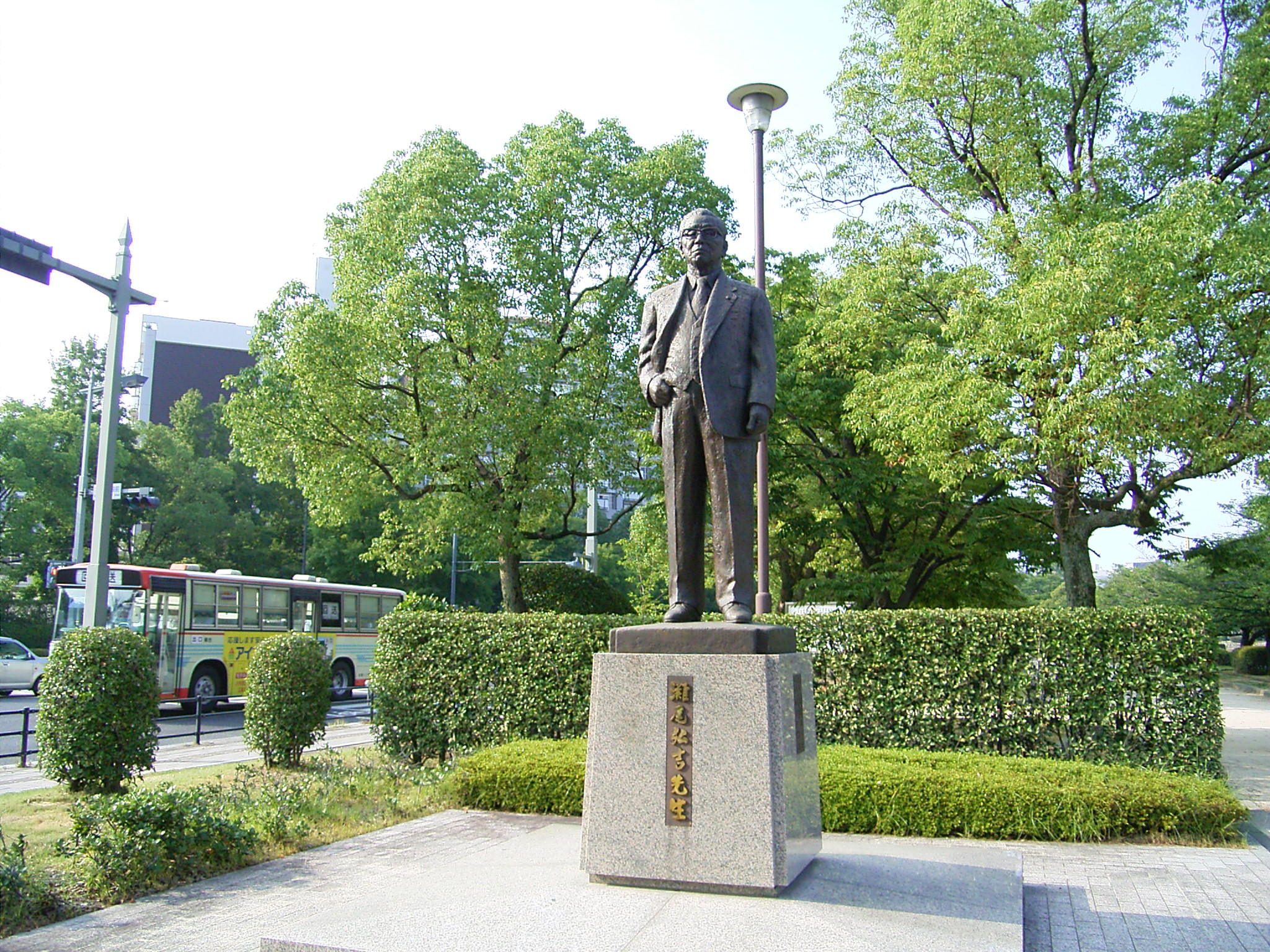
Statue of Nadao at Hiroshima Castle

Nadao was born in Hiroshima Prefecture in 1899. He graduated with a degree in jurisprudence from Tokyo Imperial University and joined the Home Ministry, rising to the position of Vice Minister pre-war. During the war, he served as Governor of Oita Prefecture.

After the war, Nadao became one of the main people who pushed through the 1954 Police Law (as Minister of Health and Welfare at the time). He was also a member of the "Taiwan faction" of Japanese politics, influencing the foreign policy of Prime Minister Eisaku Satō. He served as the chairman of the Diet Members' Talkfest on Japan-China Relations, visiting Taipei with a delegation to meet with Chiang Kai-Shek in 1959 (the first time any Japanese politician had done so since the cutting of ties with Taipei). In March 1973, Nadao created the LDP Members' Talkfest on Japan-China Relations.

As Education Minister, Nadao was one of the chairmen of the Education System Research Council. Under the premiership of Prime Minister Nobusuke Kishi, Nadao was hawkish towards the teachers' union, Nikkyoso, and the general council for trade unions, Sōhyō, arguing that teachers should not argue for better wages because they should teach based on their conviction and duty to their noble profession. His stand against Nikkyoso was what he was known for within the Ministry of Education, and lumped him in with other members of the "education-public peace" or "law and order" clique, or Bunkyo-chian zoku.

Nadao was also responsible for policies pushing national identity through education. In 1968, he voiced his support for teaching children about the Emperor of Japan, his descent from the sun goddess Amaterasu, and the formation of the Japanese monarchy. He also called for an reevaluation of the 6-3-3-4 system (6 years of primary school, 3 years of junior secondary school, 3 years of senior secondary school, and 4 years of university).

After having served as Minister of Education multiple times, Nadao became a main member of the Education Committee of the LDP. In 1976, Nadao was named as one of the most powerful men in Japanese politics.
