= First Tanaka cabinet =

Cabinet of Japan (1972)

First Kakuei Tanaka Cabinet
- 64th Cabinet of Japan
- July–December 1972
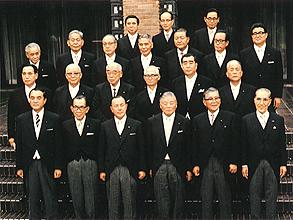
- Date formed: July 7, 1972
- Date dissolved: December 22, 1972

People and organisations
- Emperor: Shōwa
- Prime Minister: Kakuei Tanaka
- Member party: Liberal Democratic Party
- Status in legislature: Majority (Lower House)
- Opposition parties: Japan Socialist Party; Kōmeitō; Democratic Socialist Party; Japanese Communist Party

History
- Election: 1972 general election
- Predecessor: Third Satō Cabinet (Reshuffle)
- Successor: Second Kakuei Tanaka Cabinet

The First Kakuei Tanaka Cabinet is the 64th Cabinet of Japan headed by Kakuei Tanaka from July 7 to December 22, 1972.

== Cabinet ==
Portfolio	Minister	Term start	Term end
Prime Minister	Kakuei Tanaka	July 7, 1972	December 22, 1972
Deputy Prime Minister; Minister of State	Takeo Miki	July 7, 1972	December 22, 1972
Minister of Justice	Yūichi Kōri	July 7, 1972	December 22, 1972
Minister for Foreign Affairs	Masayoshi Ōhira	July 7, 1972	December 22, 1972
Minister of Finance	Koshiro Ueki	July 7, 1972	December 22, 1972
Minister of Education	Osamu Inaba	July 7, 1972	December 22, 1972
Minister of Health	Shunji Shiomi	July 7, 1972	December 22, 1972
Minister of Agriculture, Forestry and Fisheries	Tokurō Adachi	July 7, 1972	December 22, 1972
Minister of International Trade and Industry; Director of the Science and Technology Agency	Yasuhiro Nakasone	July 7, 1972	December 22, 1972
Minister of Transport	Hideyo Sasaki	July 7, 1972	December 22, 1972
Minister of Posts	Kakuei Tanaka	July 7, 1972	July 12, 1972
Minister of Posts	Makoto Miike	July 12, 1972	December 22, 1972
Minister of Labor	Hajime Tamura	July 7, 1972	December 22, 1972
Minister of Construction; Chair of the National Public Safety Commission; Director of the Kinki Regional Development Agency; Director of the Chubu Regional Development and Maintenance Agency; Chair of the National Capital Region Development Commission	Takeo Kimura	July 7, 1972	December 22, 1972
Minister of Home Affairs; Director of the Hokkaido Regional Development Agency	Hajime Fukuda	July 7, 1972	December 22, 1972
Chief Cabinet Secretary	Susumu Nikaidō	July 7, 1972	December 22, 1972
Director-General of the Prime Minister's Office; Director of the Okinawa Development Agency Development	Takeshi Honna	July 7, 1972	December 22, 1972
Director of the Defense Agency	Keikichi Masuhara	July 7, 1972	December 22, 1972
Director of the Economic Planning Agency	Kakuei Tanaka	July 7, 1972	July 12, 1972
Director of the Economic Planning Agency	Kiichi Arita	July 12, 1972	December 22, 1972
Director of the Administrative Management Agency	Seigo Hamano	July 7, 1972	December 22, 1972
Director of the Environment Agency	Osanori Koyama	July 7, 1972	December 22, 1972
Director-General of the Cabinet Legislation Bureau	Ichiro Yoshikuni	July 7, 1972	December 22, 1972
Deputy Chief Cabinet Secretary (Political Affairs)	Ganri Yamashita	July 7, 1972	December 22, 1972
Deputy Chief Cabinet Secretary (General Affairs)	Masaharu Gotōda	July 7, 1972	December 22, 1972
Deputy Chief Cabinet Secretary for the Prime Minister's Office (Political Affairs)	Jūshirō Komiyama	July 7, 1972	December 22, 1972
Deputy Chief Cabinet Secretary for the Prime Minister's Office (General Affairs)	Renpei Kuriyama	July 7, 1972	December 22, 1972
