= Michita Sakata =

Japanese politician

- 坂田 道太
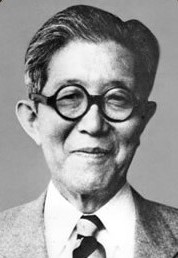
- Official portrait, 1968

Speaker of the House of Representatives
- In office 24 January 1985 – 2 June 1986
- Monarch: Hirohito
- Deputy: Seiichi Katsumata
- Preceded by: Kenji Fukunaga
- Succeeded by: Kenzaburō Hara
Ministerial offices
Minister of Justice
In office 30 November 1981 – 27 November 1982
Prime Minister	Zenkō Suzuki
Preceded by	Seisuke Okuno
Succeeded by	Akira Hatano
Director-General of the Defense Agency
In office 12 September 1974 – 24 December 1976
Prime Minister	Takeo Miki
Preceded by	Sōsuke Uno
Succeeded by	Asao Mihara
Minister of Education
In office 30 November 1968 – 5 July 1971
Prime Minister	Eisaku Satō
Preceded by	Hirokichi Nadao
Succeeded by	Saburo Takami
Minister of Health and Welfare
In office 12 January 1959 – 18 June 1959
Prime Minister	Nobusuke Kishi
Preceded by	Ryogo Hashimoto
Succeeded by	Yoshio Watanabe

Member of the House of Representatives; from Kumamoto
- In office 11 April 1946 – 24 January 1990
- Preceded by: Constituency established
- Succeeded by: Noriaki Watase
- Constituency: At-large district (1946–1947); 2nd district (1947–1990)

Personal details
- Born: 18 July 1916 Yatsushiro, Kumamoto, Japan
- Died: 13 January 2004 (aged 87)
- Party: Liberal Democratic (after 1955)
- Other political affiliations: JLP (1945–1948); DLP (1948–1950); LP (1950–1955)
- Parent: Michio Sakata (father)
- Education: Tokyo Imperial University
- Awards: Junior Second Rank; Order of the Paulownia Flowers

Michita Sakata (Japanese: 坂田 道太; 18 July 1916 – 13 January 2004) was a Japanese politician and member of the House of Representatives. Throughout his career, he served as the Minister of Education, Head of the Defense Agency, Minister of Justice, Minister of Health and Welfare, and Speaker of the House of Representatives.

Sakata's prolific career spanned over 40 years, beginning in 1946 and ending in his retirement in 1990, being reelected 16 times to the House of Representatives. He is most known for his role in the suppression of the 1968-69 Japanese university protests as Minister of Education, as well as for his tenure as the Director of the Defense Agency, when he helped write the National Defense Program Outline and set guidelines for US-Japan cooperation.

== Early life and education ==
Sakata was born in 1916 in Yatsushiro, Kumamoto, Japan, to a land-owning family. His parents were Michio and Youko Sakata, and he hailed from a political family background. Both his grandfather and his father were members of the Rikken Seiyūkai and active in local and national politics (Michio Sakata, Michita's father, was the mayor of Kumamoto for some time). He attended Yatsushiro Middle School and Seijou High School (after failing the entrance examinations for a prestigious school in Kumamoto, Sakata moved to Tokyo to attend Seijou, where he was allowed to pursue his interests in the humanities and arts further). He then went on to study German studies at Tokyo Imperial University.

== Political career ==
Having graduated from university in 1942, Sakata began to work for Mitsujiro Ishii, the Minister of Commerce. However, in 1946, at the age of 29, he ran for the House of Representatives in Kumamoto and won.

=== Minister of Education ===
Having been elected to the Diet, Sakata began work on educational problems. He worked for the Policy Affairs Research Council and was chairman of the Education System Research Council (ESRC) twice during the 1960s. During the 1968-69 Japanese university protests, Sakata, as chairman of the ESRC, launched an investigation into the causes of the student unrest. From September to November 1968, Sakata and the ESRC gathered information from people involved, concluding in the creation of a document recommending radical change to university structure. In November, Prime Minister Eisaku Satō appointed Sakata to the position of Minister of Education. Following the siege of the University of Tokyo and the end of the protests, Sakata and Satō toured the university, bringing widespread media attention to Sakata as the Minister of Education (Sakata, in reality, had no involvement with the siege). In the following year, Sakata worked to push the Act on Temporary Measures Concerning University Management through the National Diet, curbing student activism greatly.

Following the student unrest, Sakata worked as Minister of Education to address the problem at its core. Sakata worked to form a clique of young politicians within the Diet – the Education zoku. In a statement made at the Educational Committee of the House of Representatives in 1970, Sakata announced a plan to open the University of the Air by 1973. Sakata and his clique were firm supporters of the radical proposals of the Central Council for Education. However, before the Council could publish their report in 1971, Sakata was replaced as Minister of Education by Takami Saburo, a move that provided a decisive blow to the Council.

=== Director-General of the Japan Defense Agency ===
In December 1974, Sakata was appointed head of the Defense Agency, later known as the Ministry of Defense. Right before the resignation of Prime Minister Kakuei Tanaka, he was told to visit Nicaragua as its president had just been inaugurated. However, he was stuck in London with his wife and was told to immediately return to Japan as Takeo Miki had just been appointed Prime Minister. Upon returning to Japan, he was appointed as Director of the Defense Agency by Miki. In an interview, Sakata recalls that he took the job with "light-hearted kind of feelings [sic]" because he was interested, as an educationist, in such subjects as the education of soldiers. He consistently referred to himself as an "amateur" in terms of defense policy, as he was, at his heart, an educator. However, he believed that it was better to look at defense policy through amateurish eyes than through the lens of someone well-versed in the topic. His main goal within the Defense Agency was to form a consensus within the general population about issues of defense – he remarked in an interview that his philosophy towards defense policy was that "a defense policy that doesn't have the consent of the citizenry does not have fundamental meaning". Sakata also believed that the defense of Japan was supported by three main factors – the will of the Japanese population, the size of the JSDF and the Treaty of Mutual Cooperation and Security Between the United States and Japan. He was considered a dove within the Diet due to his desire for a "small, but high quality" defense agency. In 1975, Sakata launched an investigative commission into security problems under Inoki Masamichi to try and convince the United States of alternatives to foreign policy within East Asia – Sakata wished for the US to focus on investment and the improvement of diplomatic relationships more instead of only increasing military buildup, an idea later known as comprehensive security.

In 1976, Sakata and Miki set an outline for how the Japanese military should be built in the form of the National Defense Program Outline (NDPO) based on Miki and Sakata's ideas of building a consensus within the LDP regarding defense issues. One of the key reasons why was because Sakata and Miki were afraid that the US, having pulled out of the Vietnam War, would pull out of their relationship with Japan. The plan was drawn up by an advisory panel consisting of eleven "moderates". The plan focused more on the Japan Maritime Self-Defense Force as it had been lagging behind the other branches of the JSDF. The plan put into government policy the "standard defense force concept" – the idea that the JSDF would have enough military power to not lose a war, but not win it at the same time. The conclusion on Japan's defense situation made in the NDPO was that:

Assuming that the international political structure in this region—along with continuing efforts for global stabilization—will not undergo any major changes for some time to come, and that Japan’s domestic conditions will also remain fundamentally stable, the most appropriate defense goal would seem to be the maintenance of a full surveillance posture in peacetime and the ability to cope effectively with situations up to the point of limited and small-scale aggression.

The "limited and small-scale aggression" is claimed by Oren and Brummer to refer to possible aggression by the Soviet Union. This would mean that Japan saw the Soviet Union as a direct and concrete threat to their national security at the time.

Sakata preferred the idea that Japan's national defense budget would not exceed one percent of the country's Gross National Product, but argued against the Ministry of Finance that the one percent ceiling would come soon, and that considering American policy towards Japan at the time (encouragement for the buildup of the Japanese military), the limit was unwise to be officially imposed. In August 1976, Sakata met with US Secretary of Defense James R. Schlesinger, agreeing to increase cooperation between the US and Japan. This was important in building the Guidelines for Japan-US Defense Cooperation and in increasing military coordination between the two countries.

== Later life ==
From 1985 to 1986, Sakata served as the Speaker of the House of Representatives. During his term as Speaker, he helped establish a council on political ethics within the House to counter corruption following Prime Minister Tanaka's involvement in the Lockheed bribery scandals. In 1989, after the resignation of Prime Minister Noboru Takeshita, Sakata was considered as a strong potential successor and was recommended as one by party leadership. However, Sakata turned the position down, noting that he would not like to serve in a "highly political position" having served as a neutral Speaker. He retired from politics in 1990, aged 73.

== See also ==
- 1968-69 Japanese university protests
- Takeo Miki
- Japan Self-Defense Forces
