= Kosuke Hori =

Japanese politician (1934–2023)

- 保利 耕輔
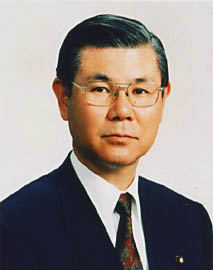
- Official portrait, 1999

Minister of Home Affairs
- In office 5 October 1999 – 4 July 2000
- Prime Minister: Keizō Obuchi; Yoshirō Mori
- Preceded by: Takeshi Noda
- Succeeded by: Mamoru Nishida

Chairman of the National Public Safety Commission
- In office 5 October 1999 – 4 July 2000
- Prime Minister: Keizō Obuchi; Yoshirō Mori
- Preceded by: Takeshi Noda
- Succeeded by: Mamoru Nishida

Minister of Education
- In office 28 February 1990 – 29 December 1990
- Prime Minister: Toshiki Kaifu
- Preceded by: Kazuya Ishibashi
- Succeeded by: Yutaka Inoue

Member of the House of Representatives
- In office 30 October 1979 – 21 November 2014
- Preceded by: Shigeru Hori
- Succeeded by: Constituency abolished
- Constituency: Saga at-large (1979–1996); Saga 3rd (1996–2014)

Personal details
- Born: 23 September 1934 Tokyo, Japan
- Died: 4 November 2023 (aged 89) Kawasaki, Kanagawa, Japan
- Party: Liberal Democratic
- Parent: Shigeru Hori (father)
- Education: Keio University

Kosuke Hori (保利 耕輔, Hori Kōsuke; 23 September 1934 – 4 November 2023) was a Japanese politician of the Liberal Democratic Party, who served as a member of the House of Representatives in the Diet (national legislature). A native of Tokyo and graduate of Keio University, he was elected for the first time in 1979. He served as Minister of Education in 1990 and as Minister of Internal Affairs and Communications from 1999 to 2000.

Hori was appointed head of the LDP's Policy Research Council on 1 August 2008. Hori died from aspiration pneumonia on 4 November 2023, at the age of 89.

== Election history ==
Election	Age	District	Political party	Number of votes	election results
1979 Japanese general election	45	Saga At-large	LDP	105,990	winning
1980 Japanese general election	45	Saga At-large	LDP	98,151	winning
1983 Japanese general election	49	Saga At-large	LDP	84,913	winning
1986 Japanese general election	51	Saga At-large	LDP	91,114	winning
1990 Japanese general election	55	Saga At-large	LDP	81,415	winning
1993 Japanese general election	58	Saga At-large	LDP	86,368	winning
1996 Japanese general election	62	Saga 3rd district	LDP	91,871	winning
2000 Japanese general election	65	Saga 3rd district	LDP	106,757	winning
2003 Japanese general election	69	Saga 3rd district	LDP	102,859	winning
2005 Japanese general election	70	Saga 3rd district	Independent	87,485	winning
2009 Japanese general election	74	Saga 3rd district	LDP	93,681	winning
2012 Japanese general election	78	Saga 3rd district	LDP	96,544	winning

== Sources ==
- 政治家情報 〜保利 耕輔〜. JANJAN ザ･選挙 (in Japanese).
