= Seijuro Arafune =

Japanese politician

- 荒舩 清十郎
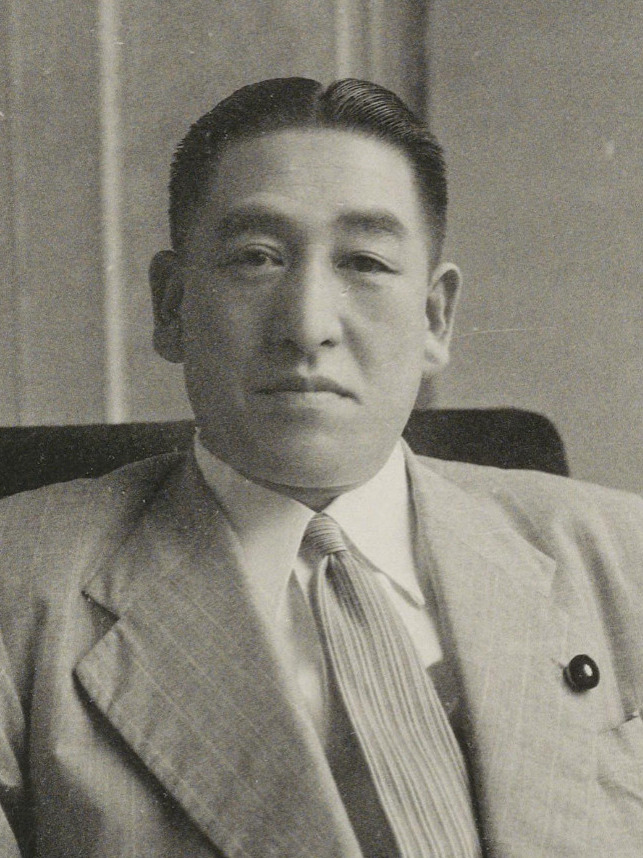
- Arafune in 1953

Director-General of the Administrative Management Agency
- In office 28 November 1977 – 7 December 1978
- Prime Minister: Takeo Fukuda
- Preceded by: Eiichi Nishimura
- Succeeded by: Motohiko Kanai
- In office 15 September 1976 – 24 December 1976
- Prime Minister: Takeo Miki
- Preceded by: Yūzō Matsuzawa
- Succeeded by: Eiichi Nishimura

Vice Speaker of the House of Representatives
- In office 14 January 1970 – 29 January 1972
- Speaker: Funada Naka
- Preceded by: Sensuke Fujieda
- Succeeded by: Shirō Hasegawa

Minister of Transport
- In office 1 August 1966 – 14 October 1966
- Prime Minister: Eisaku Satō
- Preceded by: Torata Nakamura
- Succeeded by: Sensuke Fujieda

Member of the House of Representatives
- In office 1 October 1952 – 25 November 1980
- Preceded by: Tomiyuki Takada
- Succeeded by: Eitaro Itoyama
- Constituency: Saitama 3rd
- In office 10 April 1946 – January 1947
- Preceded by: Constituency established
- Succeeded by: Multi-member district
- Constituency: Saitama at-large

Personal details
- Born: 9 March 1907 Chichibu, Saitama, Japan
- Died: 25 November 1980 (aged 73) Sagamihara, Kanagawa, Japan
- Party: Liberal Democratic
- Other political affiliations: JLP (1946–1947); LP (1952–1955)
- Education: Meiji University

Seijuro Arafune (荒舩 清十郎, Arafune Seijūrō; 9 March 1907 – 25 November 1980) was a Japanese politician and a Minister of Transport. He was a member of Liberal Democratic Party. Arafune resigned the Minister of Transport 1966 after a political scandal where he had taken two businessmen with him on a trip paid for by the Japanese govermnement, and ordered the National Railways to create an express stop in his home town.

== Biography ==
Arafune was born in Katashino village, Chichibu District, Saitama currently Chichibu, Saitama in 1907.

- 11 April 1946 - 24 November 1980 Member of the House of Representatives
- 1 August 1966 - 14 October 1966 Minister of Transport
- 14 January 1970 - 29 January 1972 Vice-Speaker of the House of Representatives

== See also ==
- Order of the Rising Sun
