= First Ōhira cabinet =

Cabinet of Japan (1978–1979)

First Ōhira Cabinet
- 68th Cabinet of Japan

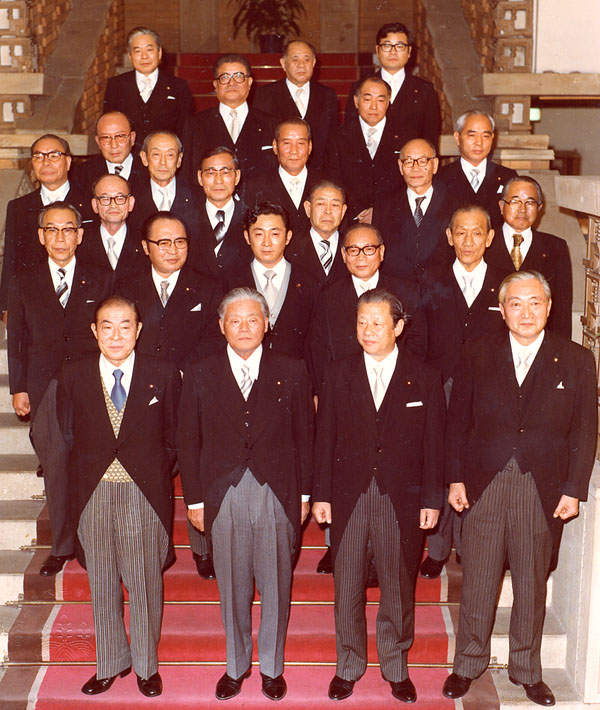
- Date formed: December 7, 1978
- Date dissolved: November 9, 1979

People and organisations
- Emperor: Shōwa
- Prime Minister: Masayoshi Ōhira
- Member party: Liberal Democratic Party
- Status in legislature: Majority government (Lower House)
- Opposition parties: Japan Socialist Party; Kōmeitō; Democratic Socialist Party; Japanese Communist Party

History
- Election: 35th general election (1979)
- Predecessor: Takeo Fukuda Cabinet (Reshuffle)
- Successor: Second Ōhira Cabinet

The First Ōhira Cabinet is the 68th Cabinet of Japan headed by Masayoshi Ōhira from December 7, 1978 to November 9, 1979.

== Cabinet ==
Portfolio	Minister	Note
Prime Minister	Masayoshi Ōhira	
Minister of Justice	Yoshimi Furui	
Minister for Foreign Affairs	Sunao Sonoda	
Minister of Finance	Ippei Kaneko	
Minister of Education	Takasaburō Naitō	
Minister of Health	Ryutaro Hashimoto	
Minister of Agriculture, Forestry and Fisheries	Michio Watanabe	
Minister of International Trade and Industry	Masumi Esaki	
Minister of Transport	Kinji Moriyama	
Minister of Posts	Nikichi Shirayama	
Minister of Labor	Yūkō Kurihara	
Minister of Construction	Motosaburō Tokai	
Minister of Home Affairs; Chair of the National Public Safety Commission; Director of the Hokkaido Regional Development Agency	Naozō Shibuya	
Chief Cabinet Secretary	Rokusuke Tanaka	
Director-General of the Prime Minister's Office; Director of the Okinawa Development Agency Development	Asao Mihara	
Director of the Administrative Management Agency	Motohiko Kanai	
Director of the Defense Agency	Ganri Yamashita	
Director of the Economic Planning Agency; Minister for International Economy	Tokusaburō Kosaka	
Director of the Science and Technology Agency; Chair of the Atomic Energy Commission	Iwazō Kaneko	
Director of the Environment Agency	Sen'ichiro Uemura	
Director of the National Land Agency	Shirō Nakano	
Deputy Chief Cabinet Secretary	Koichi Kato	for Political Affairs; Appointed on December 8, 1978
Deputy Chief Cabinet Secretary	Kyūjirō Okina (Bureaucrat)	for General Affairs; Appointed on December 12, 1978
Director-General of the Cabinet Legislation Bureau	Hideo Sanada (Bureaucrat)	Appointed on December 8, 1978
Deputy Chief Cabinet Secretary for the Prime Minister's Office	Eisaku Sumi	for Political Affairs; Appointed on December 8, 1978
Deputy Chief Cabinet Secretary for the Prime Minister's Office	Kimimasa Akitomi (Bureaucrat)	for General Affairs; Appointed on December 8, 1978
