= Central Council for Education =

Japanese education advisory council

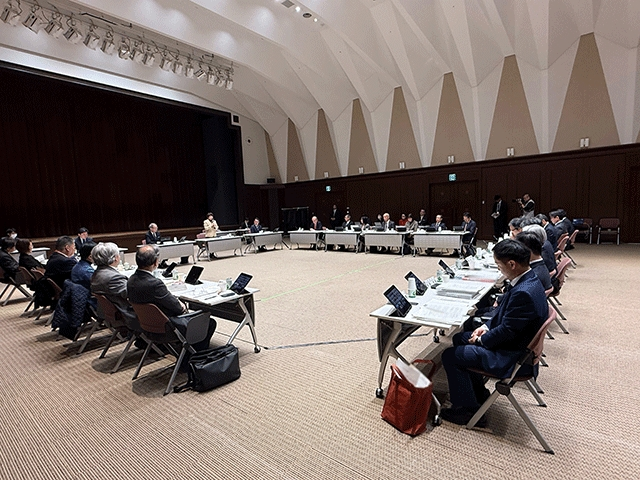
At the Central Council for Education

The Central Council for Education (Japanese: 中央教育審議会, Chuo Kyoiku Shingikai or Japanese: 中教審, Chukyoshin) is a permanent advisory council in the Ministry of Education, Culture, Sports, Science and Technology in Japan. Set up to advise the Minister of Education in 1952, the CCE has been responsible for helping plan multiple reforms in education policy in Japan.

== History ==
The Central Council for Education was formed in June 1952 to investigate the educational system and propose policies regarding educational policy. It was formed as a successor to the Educational Reform Council, a post-war educational council, which proposed the formation of the CCE in November 1951.

In the 1960s, the Central Council for Education was responsible for proposing the (failed) proposal concerning six-year vocational secondary schools. They put an emphasis on vocational education, saying in 1966 that secondary education should be "diversified in response to careful consideration of societal demands."

In 1967, Minister of Education Kennoki Toshihiro called on the Central Council for Education to make reforms to the Japanese education system and to create "basic guidelines for the development of an integrated educational system suited for contemporary society." The Zenkyoto protests in 1968–9, which brought education reform to the top of government agenda, brought the CCE to the forefront of politics. After the CCE helped deal with the disturbances in 1969, they began to produce "basic guidelines" for reform in 1971. The CCE proposed multiple reforms, but radical ones, such as the reformation of the 6-3-3 (6 years of elementary school, 3 years of middle school, and 3 years of high school) were faced with fierce opposition and failed. However, the CCE did help in passing certain smaller reforms such as higher wages for teachers.

During the 2001 Central Government Reform, in January 2001, the Lifelong Education Council, the Science Education and Industrial Education Council, the Curriculum Council, the Educational Personnel Training Council, the University Council and the Health and Physical Education Council were integrated into a new version of the Central Council for Education. The Minister of Education asked the CCE to consider "{1} measures to promote community service activities and experiential activities of youth; {2} the future of the educational personnel certificate system; {3} measures to promote the reform of higher education; and {4} comprehensive measures for the building of stamina in children."
