= Second Ōhira cabinet =

Cabinet of Japan (1979–1980)

Second Ōhira Cabinet
- 69th Cabinet of Japan

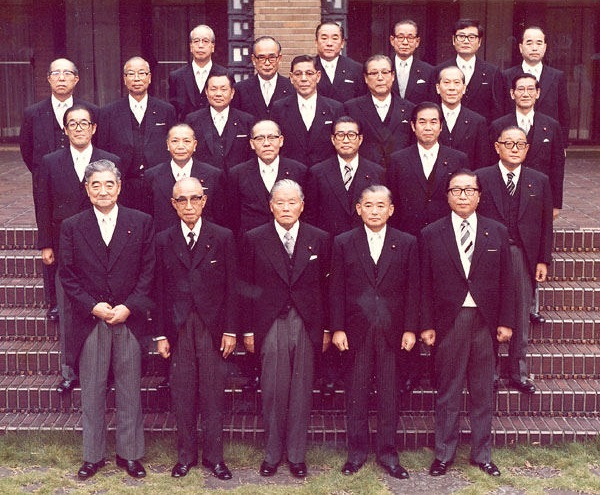
- Date formed: November 9, 1979
- Date dissolved: July 17, 1980

People and organisations
- Emperor: Shōwa
- Prime Minister: Masayoshi Ōhira; Acting: Masayoshi Ito (June 12 - July 17, 1980)
- Member party: Liberal Democratic Party
- Status in legislature: Majority government (Lower House)
- Opposition parties: Japan Socialist Party; Kōmeitō; Democratic Socialist Party; Japanese Communist Party

History
- Elections: 36th general election (1980); 12th Councillors election (1980)
- Predecessor: First Ōhira Cabinet
- Successor: Zenkō Suzuki Cabinet

The Second Ōhira Cabinet is the 69th Cabinet of Japan headed by Masayoshi Ōhira from November 9, 1979, to July 17, 1980.

== Cabinet ==
Portfolio	Minister	Note
Prime Minister	Masayoshi Ōhira	Died on June 12, 1980
Deputy Prime Minister; Chief Cabinet Secretary	Masayoshi Ito	Acting Prime Minister (June 12 - July 17, 1980)
Minister of Justice	Tadao Kuraishi	
Minister for Foreign Affairs	Saburo Okita	Non-member of the National Diet
Minister of Finance	Noboru Takeshita	
Minister of Education	Masayoshi Ōhira	Acting ( - November 20, 1979)
Minister of Education	Sen'ichi Tanigaki	Appointed on November 20, 1979
Minister of Health	Kyōichi Noro	
Minister of Agriculture, Forestry and Fisheries	Kabun Mutō	
Minister of International Trade and Industry	Yoshitake Sasaki	
Minister of Transport	Usaburō Chisaki	
Minister of Posts	Masao Ōnishi	
Minister of Labor	Takao Fujinami	
Minister of Construction	Eiichi Watanabe	
Minister of Home Affairs; Chair of the National Public Safety Commission; Director of the Hokkaido Regional Development Agency	Masaharu Gotōda	
Director-General of the Prime Minister's Office; Director of the Okinawa Development Agency Development	Keizō Obuchi	
Director of the Administrative Management Agency	Sōsuke Uno	
Director of the Defense Agency	Enji Kubota	Resigned on February 4, 1980
Director of the Defense Agency	Kichizō Hosoda	Appointed on February 4, 1980
Director of the Economic Planning Agency; Minister for International Economy	Keijirō Shōji	
Director of the Science and Technology Agency	Yūji Osada	
Director of the Environment Agency	Yoshihiko Tsuchiya	
Director of the National Land Agency	Kiyomitsu Sonoda	
Deputy Chief Cabinet Secretary	Koichi Kato	for Political Affairs
Deputy Chief Cabinet Secretary	Kyūjirō Okina (Bureaucrat)	for General Affairs
Director-General of the Cabinet Legislation Bureau	Reijirō Tsunoda (Bureaucrat)	
Deputy Chief Cabinet Secretary for the Prime Minister's Office	Kōichirō Aino	for Political Affairs
Deputy Chief Cabinet Secretary for the Prime Minister's Office	Hiroo Kanno (Bureaucrat)	for General Affairs; Appointed on November 10, 1979
