= Shigeru Hori =

Japanese politician (1901–1979)

- 保利 茂
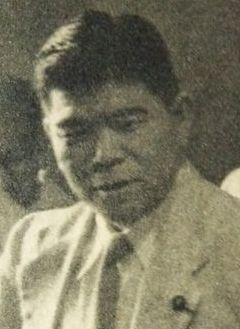
- Hori in 1952

Speaker of the House of Representatives
- In office 24 December 1976 – 1 February 1979
- Monarch: Hirohito
- Deputy: Shōichi Miyake
- Preceded by: Shigesaburō Maeo
- Succeeded by: Hirokichi Nadao
Ministerial offices
Director-General of the Administrative Management Agency
In office 25 November 1973 – 16 July 1974
| Prime Minister | Kakuei Tanaka |
| Preceded by | Takeo Fukuda |
| Succeeded by | Kichizo Hosoda |
Chief Cabinet Secretary
In office 30 November 1968 – 5 July 1971
| Prime Minister | Eisaku Satō |
| Preceded by | Toshio Kimura |
| Succeeded by | Noboru Takeshita |
In office 26 December 1951 – 30 October 1952
| Prime Minister | Shigeru Yoshida |
| Preceded by | Katsuo Okazaki |
| Succeeded by | Taketora Ogata |
Minister of Construction
In office 25 November 1967 – 30 November 1968
| Prime Minister | Eisaku Satō |
| Preceded by | Eiichi Nishimura |
| Succeeded by | Shinzo Tsubokawa |
Minister of Agriculture and Forestry
In office 22 June 1953 – 10 December 1954
| Prime Minister | Shigeru Yoshida |
| Preceded by | Nobuya Uchida |
| Succeeded by | Ichirō Kōno |
Minister of Labour
In office 28 June 1950 – 26 December 1951
| Prime Minister | Shigeru Yoshida |
| Preceded by | Masabumi Suzuki |
| Succeeded by | Eichi Yoshitake |
Party political offices
Secretary-General of the Liberal Democratic Party
In office June 1971 – July 1972
| President | Eisaku Satō |
| Preceded by | Kakuei Tanaka |
| Succeeded by | Tomisaburō Hashimoto |

Member of the House of Representatives
- In office 30 January 1967 – 4 March 1979
- Preceded by: Mikio Tatebayashi
- Succeeded by: Kosuke Hori
- Constituency: Saga at-large
- In office 24 January 1949 – 23 October 1963
- Preceded by: Tazō Ōshima
- Succeeded by: Yasuo Ōtsubo
- Constituency: Saga at-large
- In office 22 December 1944 – 31 March 1947
- Preceded by: Heiichi Matsuoka
- Succeeded by: Multi-member district
- Constituency: Saga 2nd (1944–1946); Saga at-large (1946–1947)

Personal details
- Born: 20 December 1901 Karatsu, Saga, Japan
- Died: 4 March 1979 (aged 77) Minato, Tokyo, Japan
- Party: Liberal Democratic (after 1955)
- Other political affiliations: Independent (1944–1945); JPP (1945–1947); DP (1947–1950); LP (1950–1955)
- Spouse: Yutaka Hori
- Children: Kosuke Hori
- Education: Chuo University

Shigeru Hori (保利 茂, Hori Shigeru; 20 December 1901 – 4 March 1979) was a prominent Japanese politician who served in various cabinet positions, including Chief Cabinet Secretary, and was also Speaker of the House of Representatives of Japan. He was also the founder of the Liberal Party, and later served in senior positions in the Liberal Democratic Party of Japan.

== Early life and education ==
Hori was born on 20 December 1901, in Karatsu, Saga. He graduated from Chuo University in 1924.

== Political career ==
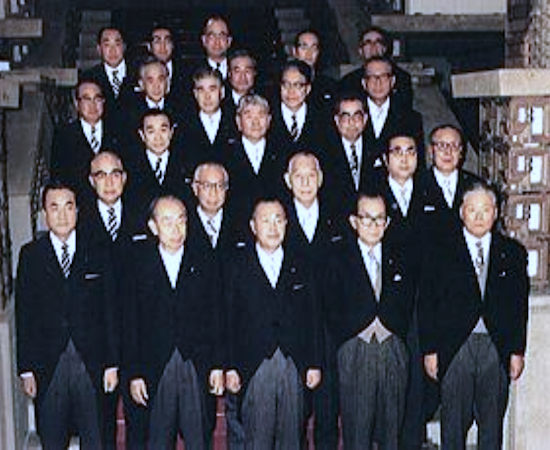
with members of the 2nd Kakuei Tanaka cabinet, after its 1st reshuffle, on 25 November 1973

Following a career as a journalist at Hochi Shimbun and Tokyo Nichi Nichi Shimbun, Hori was elected to the House of Representatives of Japan in 1944. While he was put into custody following Japan's defeat, he was released and duly returned to political life, becoming Secretary General of the Democratic Party. In 1950, Hori masterminded the union of the Democratic Party and the Democratic Liberal Party, resulting in the birth of the Liberal Party. In the same year, Hori was appointed by Shigeru Yoshida as Minister of Labour, and also later served under Yoshida as Chief Cabinet Secretary and Minister of Agriculture.

In the 1960s, Hori served under Eisaku Satō as Minister of Construction and then as Chief Cabinet Secretary. It was during this period that he rose to prominence within the Liberal Democratic Party itself, serving as its Secretary General and also as a senior figure within the Satō faction.

Towards the end of his life, Hori served as Director of the Administrative Management Agency in the Tanaka cabinet, and was Speaker of the House of Representatives of Japan, the latter of which he served until a month before his death. Hori died on 4 March 1979.

== Honours ==
- Grand Cordon of the Order of the Rising Sun (1972)

House of Representatives (Japan)
| Preceded by Shigesaburo Maeo | Speaker of the House of Representatives of Japan; 1976–1979 | Succeeded by Hirokichi Nadao |
Political offices
| Preceded by Masabumi Suzuki | Minister of Labour; 1950–1951 | Succeeded by Eichi Yoshitake |
| Preceded by Katsuo Okazaki | Chief Cabinet Secretary; 1951–1952 | Succeeded by Taketora Ogata |
| Preceded by Nobuya Uchida | Minister of Agriculture and Forestry; 1953–1954 | Succeeded by Ichirō Kōno |
| Preceded by Eiichi Nishimura | Minister of Construction; 1967–1968 | Succeeded by Shinzo Tsubokawa |
| Preceded by Toshio Kimura | Chief Cabinet Secretary; 1968–1971 | Succeeded by Noboru Takeshita |
| Preceded by Takeo Fukuda | Director of the Administrative Management Agency; 1973–1974 | Succeeded by Kichizo Hosoda |
Party political offices
| Preceded by Mitsujiro Ishii | Chair, General Council of the Liberal Democratic Party; 1960–1961 | Succeeded by Munenori Akagi |
| Preceded by Kakuei Tanaka | Secretary-General of the Liberal Democratic Party; 1971–1972 | Succeeded by Tomisaburo Hashimoto |
