= Eiichi Nishimura =

Japanese politician (1897–1987)

Senior Third Rank Eiichi Nishimura
- 西村 英一
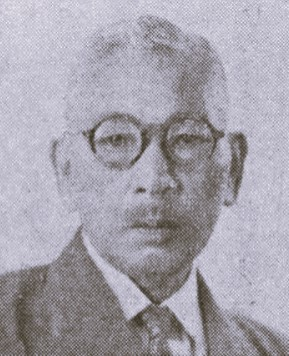

Acting President of the Liberal Democratic Party
- In office 12 June 1980 – 15 July 1980
- Vice President: Himself
- Secretary-General: Yoshio Sakurauchi
- Preceded by: Masayoshi Ōhira
- Succeeded by: Zenkō Suzuki
Ministerial offices
Director-General of the Administrative Management Agency
In office 24 December 1976 – 1 February 1979
Prime Minister	Takeo Fukuda; Masayoshi Ōhira
Preceded by	Seijuro Arafune
Succeeded by	Motohiko Kanai
Director-General of the National Land Agency
In office 26 June 1974 – 11 November 1974
Prime Minister	Kakuei Tanaka
Preceded by	Office established
Succeeded by	Hyosuke Niwa
Minister of Construction
In office 5 July 1971 – 7 July 1972
Prime Minister	Eisaku Satō
Preceded by	Nemoto Ryutaro
Succeeded by	Takeo Kimura
In office 3 December 1966 – 25 November 1967
Prime Minister	Eisaku Satō
Preceded by	Tomisaburo Hashimoto
Succeeded by	Shigeru Hori
Minister of Health and Welfare
In office 18 July 1962 – 18 July 1963
Prime Minister	Hayato Ikeda
Preceded by	Hirokichi Nadao
Succeeded by	Takeji Kobayashi
Party political offices
Vice President of the Liberal Democratic Party
In office January 1979 – November 1980
President	Masayoshi Ōhira; Himself; Zenkō Suzuki
Secretary-General	Kunikichi Saitō; Yoshio Sakurauchi
Preceded by	Funada Naka
Succeeded by	Susumu Nikaidō (1984)

Member of the House of Representatives
- In office 23 May 1958 – 19 May 1980
- Preceded by: Hideichi Noyori
- Succeeded by: Mikio Abe
- Constituency: Ōita 2nd
- In office 24 January 1949 – 24 January 1955
- Preceded by: Matsubara Kazuhiko
- Succeeded by: Hideichi Noyori
- Constituency: Ōita 2nd

Personal details
- Born: 28 August 1897 Himeshima, Ōita, Japan
- Died: 15 September 1987 (aged 90)
- Party: Liberal Democratic (after 1955)
- Other political affiliations: DLP (1948–1950); LP (1950–1955)
- Education: Tohoku Imperial University

Eiichi Nishimura (西村 英一, Nishimura Eiichi; 28 August 1897 – 15 September 1987) was a Japanese politician, who served in the Ikeda, Satō, Tanaka and Fukuda cabinets, and was the first to be appointed to the post of Director of the National Land Agency. Within the Liberal Democratic Party (LDP), he held influence in Eisaku Satō and Kakuei Tanaka factions, becoming known as the "king's counselor", or the one able to speak his mind with ease.

== Early life ==
Nishimura was born on 28 August 1897, in Higashikunisaki District, Ōita. He graduated from Tohoku Imperial University in 1924.

== Career ==
Nishimura's first venture into public office was via the Ministry of Railways, and in the immediate postwar period he was director of the Electric Bureau of the Railway Department of the Ministry of Transport. In 1949, Nishimura won election to the House of Representatives of Japan.

In 1962, Nishimura landed his first cabinet position in the cabinet of Hayato Ikeda, serving as Minister of Health. He then went on to serve under Eisaku Satō, as Construction Minister, on two separate occasions.

In the 1970s, while Nishimura continued to serve in various cabinet posts, including as the first Director of the National Land Agency under Kakuei Tanaka, he also began to solidify his rise in the LDP, firstly as leader of the Tanaka faction within the party and then becoming vice president of the party as a whole by the end of the decade.

Nishimura retired from politics in 1983. He died on 15 September 1987.

== Honours ==
- Grand Cordon of the Order of the Sacred Treasure (1968)
- Grand Cordon of the Order of the Rising Sun (1973)

Political offices
Preceded by Hirokichi Nadao	Minister of Health; 1962–1963	Succeeded by Takeji Kobayashi
Preceded by Tomisaburo Hashimoto	Minister of Construction; 1966–1967	Succeeded by Shigeru Hori
Preceded by Ryutaro Nemoto	Minister of Construction; 1971–1972	Succeeded by Takeo Kimura
New office	Minister of State; 1974	Office abolished
New office	Director of the National Land Agency; 1974	Succeeded by Hyosuke Niwa
Preceded by Seijuro Arafune	Director of the Administrative Management Agency; 1976–1977	Succeeded by Motohiko Kanai
Party political offices
Naka Funada	Vice President of the Liberal Democratic Party; 1979–1980	Hirokichi Nadao
