= Toshio Kimura =

Japanese politician and minister of foreign affairs (1909–1983)

- 木村 俊夫
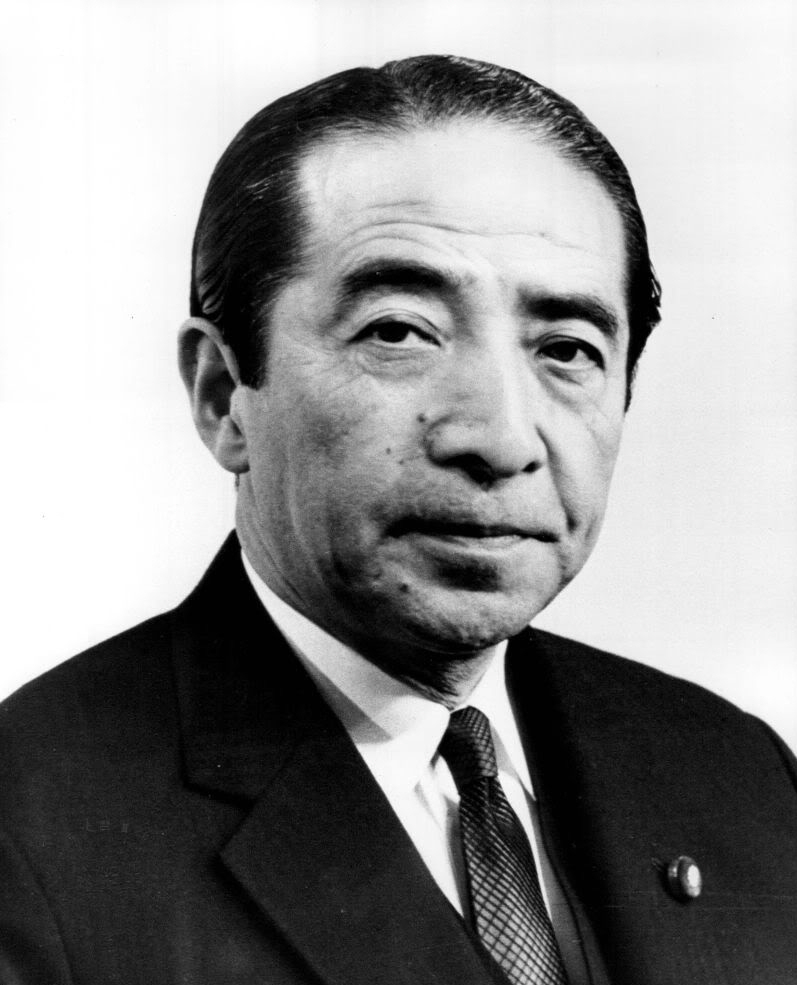
- Kimura in 1971

Minister for Foreign Affairs
- In office 16 July 1974 – 9 December 1974
- Prime Minister: Kakuei Tanaka
- Preceded by: Masayoshi Ōhira
- Succeeded by: Kiichi Miyazawa

Director-General of the Economic Planning Agency
- In office 5 July 1971 – 7 July 1972
- Prime Minister: Eisaku Satō
- Preceded by: Ichiro Sato
- Succeeded by: Kakuei Tanaka (acting); Kiichi Arita

Deputy Chief Cabinet Secretary (Political affairs)
- In office 30 November 1968 – 5 July 1971
- Prime Minister: Eisaku Satō
- Preceded by: Takao Kameoka
- Succeeded by: Asao Mihara
- In office 1 August 1966 – 22 June 1967
- Prime Minister: Eisaku Satō
- Preceded by: Noboru Takeshita
- Succeeded by: Takao Kameoka

Chief Cabinet Secretary
- In office 22 June 1967 – 30 November 1968
- Prime Minister: Eisaku Satō
- Preceded by: Kenji Fukunaga
- Succeeded by: Shigeru Hori

Member of the House of Representatives
- In office 19 April 1953 – 28 November 1983
- Preceded by: Ichirō Matsumoto
- Succeeded by: Masayasu Kitagawa
- Constituency: Mie 1st
- In office 23 January 1949 – 28 August 1952
- Preceded by: Matsuda Masakazu
- Succeeded by: Hisao Tanaka
- Constituency: Mie 1st

Personal details
- Born: 15 January 1909 Tōin, Mie, Japan
- Died: 1 December 1983 (aged 74) Tokyo, Japan
- Party: Liberal Democratic
- Other political affiliations: Independent (1949–1950); Liberal (1950–1955)
- Education: Tokyo Imperial University

Toshio Kimura (木村 俊夫, Kimura Toshio; 15 January 1909 – 1 December 1983) was a Japanese politician who served as foreign minister for six months in 1974.

== Early life ==
Kimura was born into a politically active family on 15 January 1909. His father and grandfather were both lawmakers.

== Career ==
Kimura was elected to the House of Representatives for 12 times as a member of the Liberal Democratic Party (LDP). In addition, he served as chief cabinet secretary in the cabinet led by Prime Minister Eisaku Satō. He was also chairman of the Parliamentarians' League for Japan-Palestine Friendship. He organized Yasser Arafat's visit to Japan in 1981.

His other posts include director-general of the economic planning agency and deputy chief cabinet secretary. In 1971, Kimura served as acting foreign minister. He was appointed foreign minister by Prime Minister Kakuei Tanaka in mid-July 1974, replacing Masayoshi Ohira in the post. Kimura was in office for six months in 1974. Kimura visited Africa in late October and early November 1974 which initiated a cooperation between African countries and Japan. He was the first senior Japanese government official to visit African countries. His Africa visit included Ghana, Nigeria, Zaire (now the Democratic Republic of the Congo), Tanzania, and Egypt. Then Kimura became head of the LDP's Asian-African Studies Group in 1977.

== Personal life and death ==
Kimura was married and had a daughter. He died of a heart attack at a hospital in Tokyo on 1 December 1983 at age 74.

== Honours ==
- Grand Cordon of the Order of the Rising Sun (3 November 1983)

Political offices
| Preceded by Kenji Fukunaga | Chief Cabinet Secretary; 1967–1968 | Succeeded by Shigeru Hori |
| Preceded by Ichiro Sato | Head of the Economic Planning Agency; 1971–1972 | Succeeded by Kiichi Arita |
| Preceded by Masayoshi Ōhira | Minister for Foreign Affairs; 1974 | Succeeded by Kiichi Miyazawa |
