= Masayoshi Ōhira =

Prime Minister of Japan from 1978 to 1980

- 大平 正芳
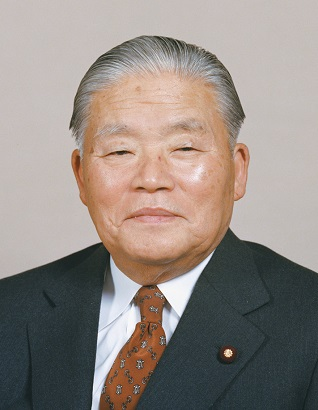
- Official portrait, 1978

Prime Minister of Japan
- In office 7 December 1978 – 12 June 1980
- Monarch: Hirohito
- Preceded by: Takeo Fukuda
- Succeeded by: Masayoshi Ito (acting); Zenkō Suzuki

President of the Liberal Democratic Party
- In office 1 December 1978 – 12 June 1980
- Vice President: Eiichi Nishimura
- Secretary-General: Kunikichi Saito
- Preceded by: Takeo Fukuda
- Succeeded by: Eiichi Nishimura (acting); Zenkō Suzuki
Ministerial offices
Minister of Finance
In office 16 July 1974 – 24 December 1976
Prime Minister	Kakuei Tanaka; Takeo Miki
Preceded by	Takeo Fukuda
Succeeded by	Hideo Bo
Minister for Foreign Affairs
In office 7 July 1972 – 16 July 1974
Prime Minister	Kakuei Tanaka
Preceded by	Takeo Fukuda
Succeeded by	Toshio Kimura
In office 18 July 1962 – 18 July 1964
Prime Minister	Hayato Ikeda
Preceded by	Zentaro Kosaka
Succeeded by	Etsusaburo Shiina
Minister of International Trade and Industry
In office 30 November 1968 – 14 January 1970
Prime Minister	Eisaku Satō
Preceded by	Etsusaburo Shiina
Succeeded by	Kiichi Miyazawa
Chief Cabinet Secretary
In office 19 July 1960 – 18 July 1962
Prime Minister	Hayato Ikeda
Preceded by	Etsusaburo Shiina
Succeeded by	Yasumi Kurogane
Party political offices
Secretary-General of the Liberal Democratic Party
In office December 1976 – December 1978
President	Takeo Fukuda
Vice President	Funada Naka (1977–1978)
Preceded by	Tsuneo Uchida
Succeeded by	Kunikichi Saitō

Member of the House of Representatives
- In office 1 October 1952 – 12 June 1980
- Preceded by: Suenobu Shimada
- Succeeded by: Hajime Morita
- Constituency: Kagawa 2nd

Personal details
- Born: 12 March 1910 Kan'onji, Kagawa, Japan
- Died: 12 June 1980 (aged 70) Minato, Tokyo, Japan
- Party: Liberal Democratic (1955–1980)
- Other political affiliations: Liberal (1952–1955)
- Spouse: Shigeko Suzuki (m. 1937)
- Children: 4
- Relatives: Hajime Morita (son-in-law)
- Education: Hitotsubashi University
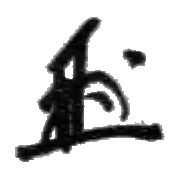
- Signature

Masayoshi Ōhira (大平 正芳, Ōhira Masayoshi; 12 March 1910 – 12 June 1980) was a Japanese politician who served as prime minister of Japan from 1978 until his death in 1980.

Born in Kagawa Prefecture, Ōhira worked in the Ministry of Finance from 1936, and served as the private secretary to Hayato Ikeda, finance minister from 1949 to 1952. Ōhira was first elected to the Diet in 1952, and served as foreign minister in Ikeda's cabinet from 1962 to 1964 and as international trade and industry minister from 1968 to 1970 under Eisaku Satō. He took over Ikeda's faction of the Liberal Democratic Party and later served as foreign minister from 1972 to 1974 under Kakuei Tanaka and as finance minister from 1974 to 1976 under Takeo Miki. He succeeded Takeo Fukuda as LDP president and prime minister in 1978. After his government was defeated in a no-confidence vote, Ōhira decided to call the 1980 election rather than resign, but died suddenly of a heart attack. He is the most recent Japanese premier to die in office. (Note: Keizō Obuchi, who suffered a stroke while in office, was removed from office on 5 April 2000 after suddenly falling into a coma a month before his death in May 2000.)

== Early life ==
Masayoshi Ōhira was born on 12 March 1910, in Wada, Kagawa Prefecture (present-day Kan'onji, Kagawa), the third son of farmer Toshiyoshi Ōhira and his wife Saku. His father was a representative of the village council and the irrigation union although he had not received any education. He had eight siblings (two elder brothers, three elder sisters, a younger brother and a younger sister) but the eldest of the sisters had died before her first birthday and one of his elder brothers had died at age two. Ōhira referred to himself as "the son of an impoverished farmer of Sanuki" but in reality his family was middle-class. But even then, the parents had a hard time supporting their six children, and Ōhira assisted their side job from a young age.

In 1926, when he was 16 years old, Ōhira contracted typhoid fever and nearly died. This near death experience contributed to his conversion to Christianity around that time.

In 1933, when he was 23, Ōhira won two scholarships and was able to belatedly attend university at the Tokyo University of Commerce (present-day Hitotsubashi University), where he studied economics. In 1936, he entered the Ministry of Finance, where he became a protégé of Hayato Ikeda.

Ōhira worked in the Ministry of Finance throughout World War II. In the postwar period, when Ikeda became Minister of Finance from 1949 to 1952, Ōhira served as his private secretary.

== Early political career ==
In 1952, at Ikeda's urging, Ōhira ran for and won the first of 10 terms in the House of Representatives of the Japanese National Diet, first representing the Liberal Party, and later its successor party the Liberal Democratic Party (LDP).

In 1957, as Ikeda prepared a push to try to become prime minister, Ōhira became a founding member of Ikeda's "Kōchikai" think tank, and was widely viewed as Ikeda's "right-hand man". He helped Ikeda write speeches and election manifestos.

Ikeda became prime minister in 1960, when Nobusuke Kishi resigned following the disastrous 1960 Anpo Protests. As a trained economist and trusted member of Ikeda's "brain trust", Ōhira helped design and implement Ikeda's famed Income Doubling Plan, which helped turn the attention of the Japanese people away from contentious political struggles to a nationwide drive for economic growth.

From 1962–1964, Ōhira served as Ikeda's Foreign Minister. In this role, he conducted the delicate negotiations which paved the way for Japan's normalization of relations with South Korea in 1965. When Ikeda died in 1964, Ōhira inherited control of his faction.

== LDP power broker ==
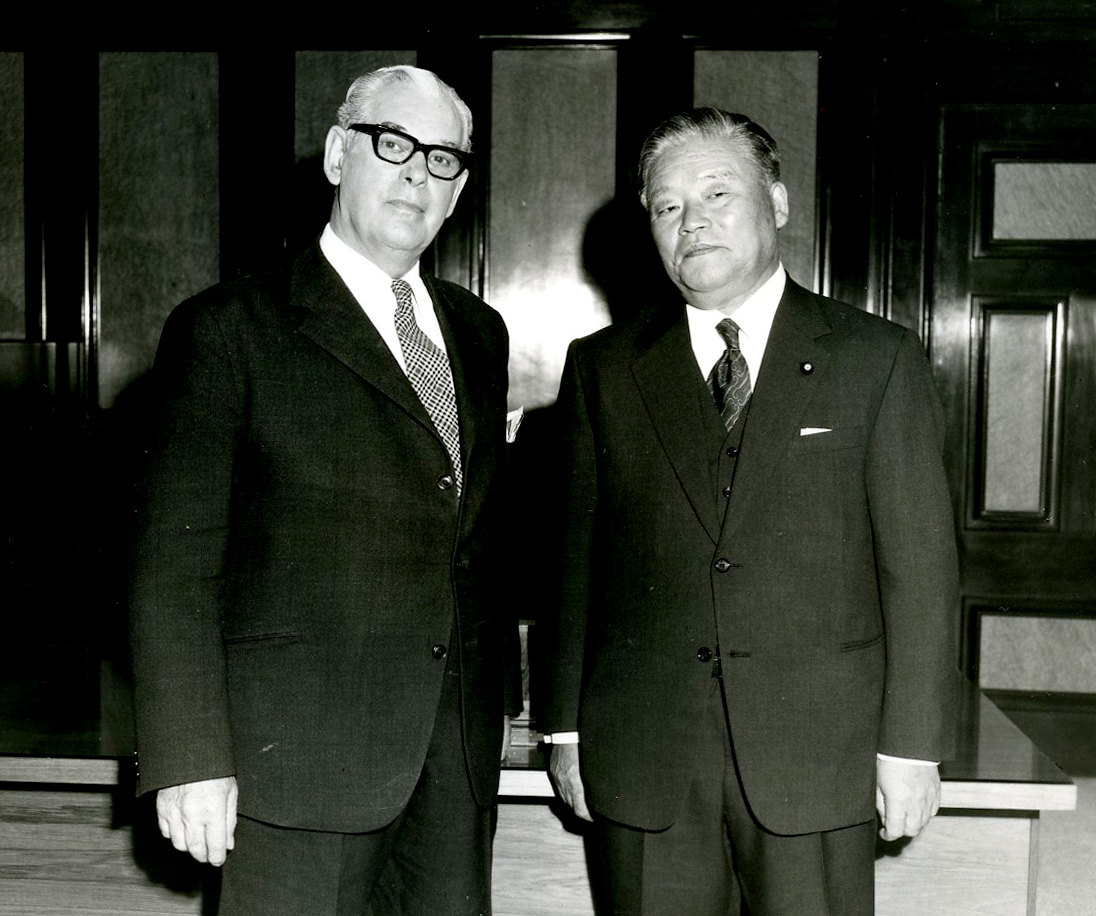
with Keith Holyoake (October 1972)

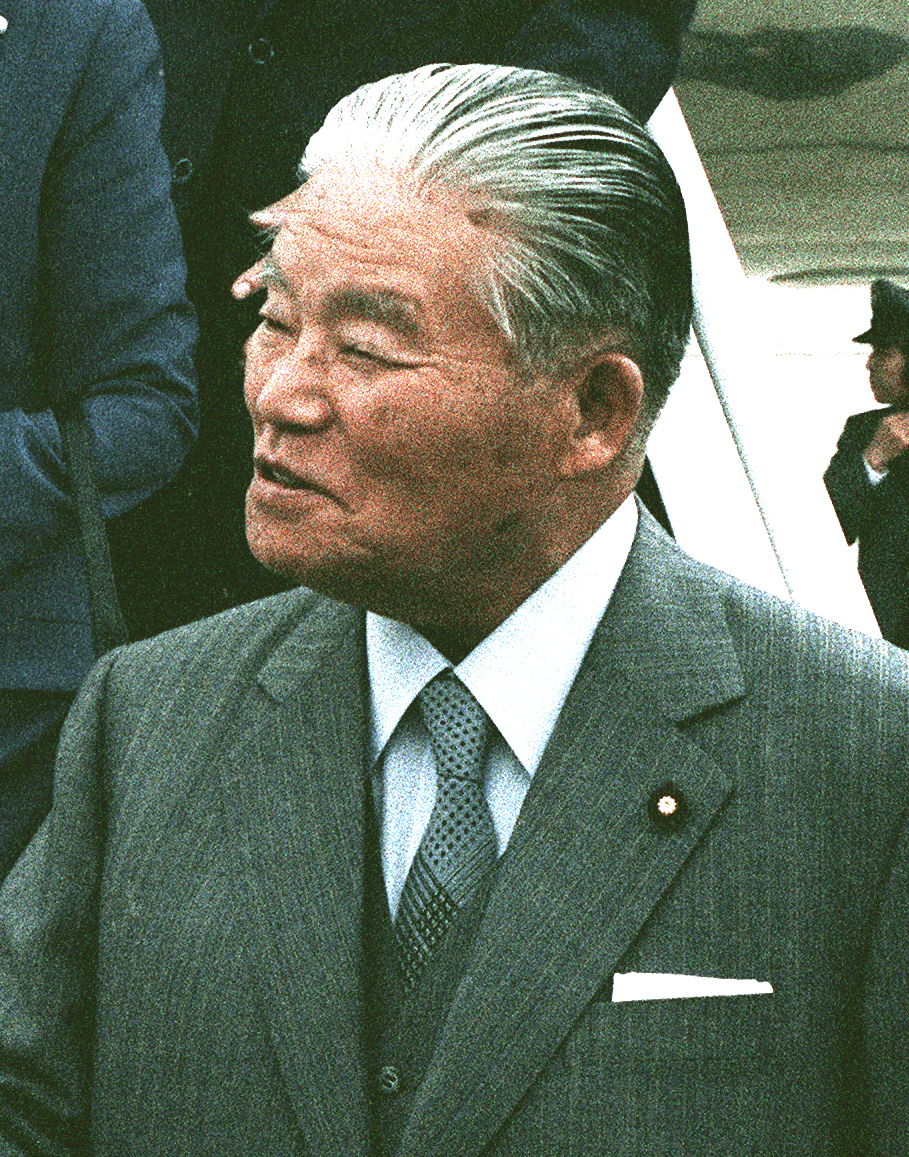
Masayoshi Ōhira at Andrews Air Force Base in 1980.

At the apex of his political life, Ōhira came to represent what were known as the "mainstream factions" within the Liberal Democratic Party (LDP), which put him at odds with Prime Minister Takeo Fukuda, who led what were known as the "anti-mainstream" factions. From 1968 to 1970, Ōhira served as Minister of International Trade and Industry under Ikeda's successor Eisaku Satō. In 1972, Ōhira unsuccessfully competed for the party leadership before throwing his support to ultimate winner Kakuei Tanaka. Ōhira was then rewarded for his support with a post as Tanaka's first Foreign Minister, which he held until mid-July 1974. In a cabinet reshuffle in July 1974, he was replaced by Toshio Kimura as Foreign Minister but then immediately appointed Finance Minister, replacing Takeo Fukuda.

== Premiership (1978–1980) ==
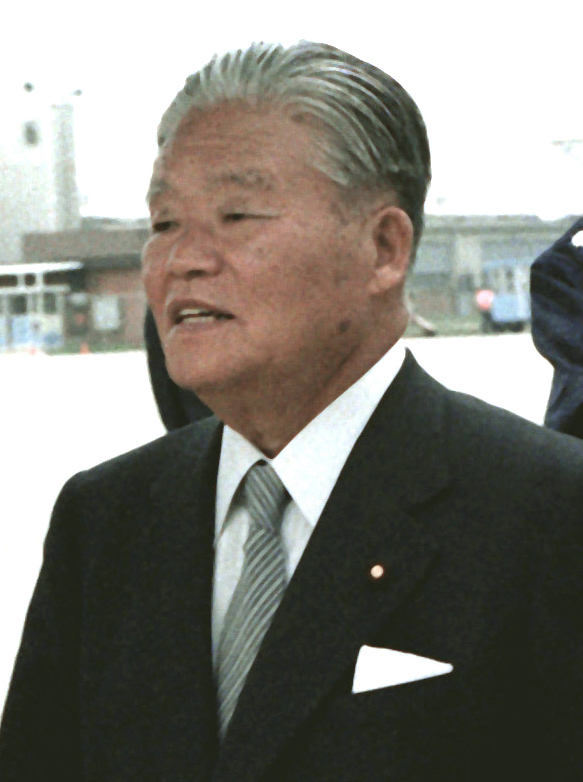
- Ōhira in 1980
- Premiership of Masayoshi Ōhira; 7 December 1978 – 12 June 1980
- Monarch: Emperor Shōwa
- Cabinet: First Ōhira Cabinet; Second Ōhira Cabinet
- Party: Liberal Democratic
- Election: 1979
- Seat: Naikaku Sōri Daijin Kantei
- Constituency: Kagawa 2nd
- Emblem of the Prime Minister of Japan

Ōhira was elected to the presidency of the LDP in late 1978. On 7 December 1978, he was appointed 68th Prime Minister, successfully pushing longtime rival Takeo Fukuda from his position.

Ōhira was the sixth Christian to hold this office after Hara Takashi, Takahashi Korekiyo, Ichirō Hatoyama, Tetsu Katayama, and Shigeru Yoshida.

In the general election of 1979, the LDP narrowly failed to win an outright majority, but enough independent members of the Diet joined the party to enable Ōhira to remain in office, and he was duly reappointed on 9 November of that year. On 16 May 1980, a vote of no confidence was held in the Diet.

Ōhira expected the motion to fail, and was visibly shaken when it passed 243–187. 69 members of his own LDP, including Fukuda, abstained. Given the choice of resigning or calling new elections, Ōhira chose the latter and began campaigning for LDP candidates.

=== Economics ===
Ōhira advocated for Modified capitalism and social corporatism.

== Death ==
Ōhira's health started to deteriorate in his 60s. During the 1980 election campaign, he was hospitalized for exhaustion on 31 May 1980 and died of a massive heart attack on 12 June, ten days before the general elections.

Chief Cabinet Secretary Masayoshi Ito acted in Ōhira's place as deputy after his death. Yoshio Sakurauchi, the Secretary General of LDP, led the LDP to its greatest victory in fifteen years, capitalizing on the "sympathy vote" generated by Ōhira's death. Zenkō Suzuki became Ōhira's successor as prime minister following the election.

== Personal life ==
=== Religion ===
Ōhira converted to Christianity during his time at the Takamatsu Higher School of Commerce (now the Takamatsu College of Economics), though without becoming a member of any formal Christian denomination. However, others have stated that he was a member of the Anglican Church in Japan during the 1970s.

== Honours ==
- Grand Cordon of the Order of the Chrysanthemum (12 June 1980; posthumous)
- Golden Pheasant Award of the Scout Association of Japan (1980)
- In Mexico City, Mexico a Japanese garden in the Country Club Churubusco neighborhood, near the CENART campus, is named in his honor.

=== Foreign honours ===
- Belgium: Order of Leopold (20 January 1964)
- Malaya: Honorary Grand Commander of the Order of the Defender of the Realm (S.M.N.) (1964)
- Brazil: Order of the Southern Cross (16 September 1976)

== See also ==
- Christianity in Japan

== Bibliography ==
- Brown, James Robert. (1999). The ministry of finance: bureaucratic practices and the transformation of the Japanese economy. Westport, Connecticut: Greenwood Publishing. ISBN 978-1-56720-230-4; OCLC 39033542
- Satō, Seizaburō Ken'ichi Kōyama and Shunpei Kumon. (1990). [Postwar Politician: The Life of Former Prime Minister Masayoshi Ohira.] Tokyo: Kodansha. ISBN 978-4-7700-1499-3

Political offices
Preceded by Etsusaburo Shiina	Chief Cabinet Secretary; 1960–1962	Succeeded by Yasumi Kurogane
Preceded by Zentaro Kosaka	Minister of Foreign Affairs; 1962–1964	Succeeded by Etsusaburo Shiina
Preceded by Etsusaburo Shiina	Minister of International Trade and Industry; 1968–1970	Succeeded by Kiichi Miyazawa
Preceded by Takeo Fukuda	Minister of Foreign Affairs; 1972–1974	Succeeded by Toshio Kimura
Preceded by Takeo Fukuda	Minister of Finance; 1974–1976	Succeeded by Hideo Bō
Preceded by Takeo Fukuda	Prime Minister of Japan; 1978–1980	Succeeded by Masayoshi Itō; Acting
House of Representatives (Japan)
Preceded by Soichi Usui	Chair, Committee on Education of the House of Representatives of Japan; 1959–1960	Succeeded by Soichi Usui; Interim
Party political offices
Preceded by Naomi Nishimura	Chair, Policy Research Committee of the Liberal Democratic Party of Japan; 1967–1968	Succeeded by Ryutaro Nemoto
Preceded by Shigesaburo Maeo	Head of Kōchikai faction 1971–1980	Succeeded by Zenkō Suzuki
Preceded by Tsuneo Uchida	Secretary-General of the Liberal Democratic Party; 1976–1978	Succeeded by Kunikichi Saito
Preceded by Takeo Fukuda	President of the Liberal Democratic Party; 1978–1980	Succeeded by Zenkō Suzuki
Diplomatic posts
Preceded by Helmut Schmidt	Chairperson of the G7; 1979	Succeeded by Francesco Cossiga
