= Ministry of Education, Science, Sports and Culture =

Japanese government ministry (1871-2001)

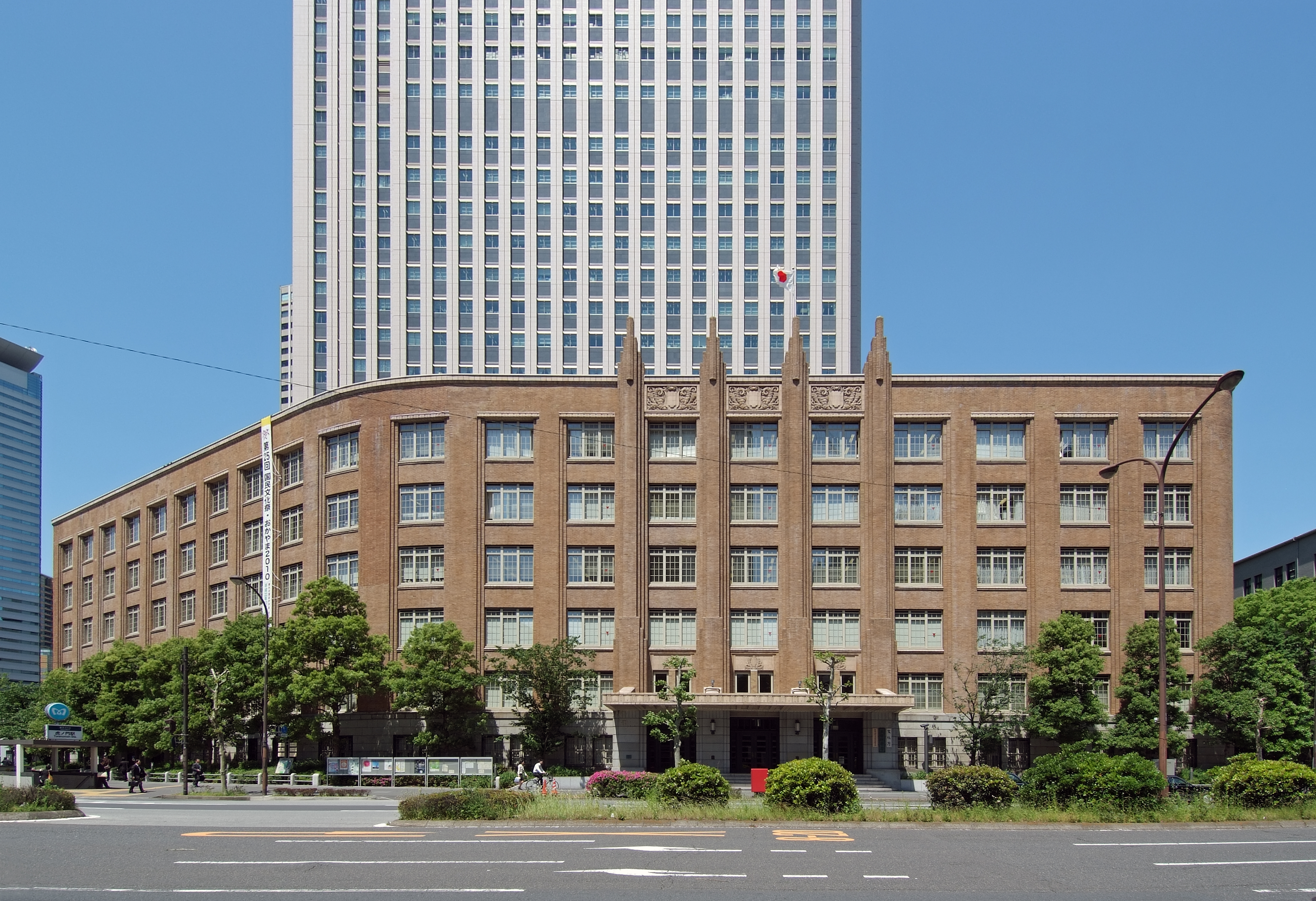
Former Ministry of Education, Culture, Sports, Science and Technology building, 2010.

The Ministry of Education, Science, Sports and Culture (文部省, Monbu-shō) was a former Japanese government ministry. Its headquarters were in Kasumigaseki, Chiyoda, Tokyo.

The Ministry of Education was created in 1871. It merged with the Science and Technology Agency (科学技術庁, Kagaku-gijutsu-chō) into the new Ministry of Education, Culture, Sports, Science and Technology (MEXT) on January 6, 2001.
