= Takeo Fukuda =

Prime Minister of Japan from 1976 to 1978

- 福田 赳夫
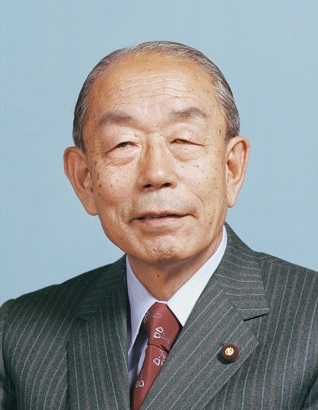
- Official portrait, 1976

Prime Minister of Japan
- In office 24 December 1976 – 7 December 1978
- Monarch: Hirohito
- Preceded by: Takeo Miki
- Succeeded by: Masayoshi Ōhira

President of the Liberal Democratic Party
- In office 23 December 1976 – 1 December 1978
- Vice President: Funada Naka
- Secretary-General: Masayoshi Ōhira
- Preceded by: Takeo Miki
- Succeeded by: Masayoshi Ōhira

Deputy Prime Minister of Japan
- In office 9 December 1974 – 6 November 1976
- Prime Minister: Takeo Miki
- Preceded by: Takeo Miki
- Succeeded by: Masayoshi Ito (1980)
Ministerial offices
Director-General of the Economic Planning Agency
In office 9 December 1974 – 6 November 1976
Prime Minister	Takeo Miki
Preceded by	Tadashi Kuranari
Succeeded by	Uichi Noda
Minister of Finance
In office 25 November 1973 – 16 July 1974
Prime Minister	Kakuei Tanaka
Preceded by	Kiichi Aichi
Succeeded by	Masayoshi Ōhira
In office 30 November 1968 – 5 July 1971
Prime Minister	Eisaku Satō
Preceded by	Mikio Mizuta
Succeeded by	Mikio Mizuta
In office 3 June 1965 – 3 December 1966
Prime Minister	Eisaku Satō
Preceded by	Kakuei Tanaka
Succeeded by	Mikio Mizuta
Director-General of the Administrative Management Agency
In office 22 December 1972 – 25 November 1973
Prime Minister	Kakuei Tanaka
Preceded by	Seigo Hamano
Succeeded by	Shigeru Hori
Minister for Foreign Affairs
In office 5 July 1971 – 7 July 1972
Prime Minister	Eisaku Satō
Preceded by	Kiichi Aichi
Succeeded by	Masayoshi Ōhira
Minister of Agriculture and Forestry
In office 18 June 1959 – 19 July 1960
Prime Minister	Nobusuke Kishi
Preceded by	Kunio Miura
Succeeded by	Tokuo Nanjō
Party political offices
Secretary-General of the Liberal Democratic Party
In office December 1966 – November 1968
President	Eisaku Satō
Vice President	Shojiro Kawashima (1967–1968)
Preceded by	Kakuei Tanaka
Succeeded by	Kakuei Tanaka
In office January 1959 – June 1959
President	Nobusuke Kishi
Vice President	Banboku Ōno
Preceded by	Shojiro Kawashima
Succeeded by	Shojiro Kawashima

Member of the House of Representatives
- In office 1 October 1952 – 18 February 1990
- Preceded by: Mitsuhei Obuchi
- Succeeded by: Yasuo Fukuda
- Constituency: Gunma 3rd

Personal details
- Born: 14 January 1905 Takasaki, Gunma, Japan
- Died: 5 July 1995 (aged 90) Kita, Tokyo, Japan
- Party: Liberal Democratic (after 1955)
- Other political affiliations: Independent (1952–1953); Liberal (1953–1955)
- Spouse: Mie Fukuda (m. 1933)
- Children: 5, including Yasuo
- Relatives: Tatsuo Fukuda (grandson); Kiyoko Fukuda (daughter-in-law)
- Education: Tokyo Imperial University
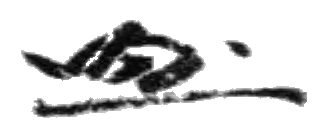
- Signature

Takeo Fukuda (福田 赳夫, Fukuda Takeo; 14 January 1905 – 5 July 1995) was a Japanese politician who served as prime minister of Japan from 1976 to 1978.

Born in Gunma Prefecture and educated at Tokyo Imperial University, Fukuda served as an official in the Ministry of Finance for two decades before entering politics. He was first elected to the Diet in 1952, and served as agriculture, forestry, and fisheries minister in 1959–1960 under Nobusuke Kishi, as head of the party's political affairs section under Hayato Ikeda, and as finance minister (1965–1966, 1968–1971) and foreign minister (1971–1972) under Eisaku Satō, becoming his protégé. Fukuda's political life was marked by a rivalry with Kakuei Tanaka, who succeeded Satō as prime minister in 1972 and under whom Fukuda served as finance minister from 1973 to 1974. As prime minister from 1976, Fukuda formulated the Fukuda Doctrine, which pledged trust and cooperation with Asian countries, and concluded the Treaty of Peace and Friendship between Japan and China in 1978. He was succeeded as premier in 1978 by Masayoshi Ōhira.

His son, Yasuo Fukuda, followed him as a politician and served as prime minister from 2007 to 2008.

== Early life and education ==
Fukuda was born in the village of Kaneko in Gunma prefecture (present day Takasaki City) on January 14, 1905, the second son to an old samurai family who had been village headmen in the Edo period. His father was the mayor of Kaneko, his grandfather had also been mayor and his older brother eventually filled the same role. Fukuda was a gifted student who went on to First Higher School in Tokyo, followed by studying law at Tokyo Imperial University. He received the top score on the civil service examination and entered the Ministry of Finance upon graduating in 1929.

== Bureaucratic career ==
Fukuda was assigned as financial attaché to the embassy of Japan in London in 1930. After three years he was called back to Japan to serve as the head of a local Tax Office.

At this time he married Mie Arai, the granddaughter of a Supreme Court justice. The couple came to have three sons and two daughters. Yasuo Fukuda was their eldest son. Fukuda steadily rose in the ranks of the Ministry. During the Pacific War he served as an adviser on fiscal policy for the Wang Jingwei regime.

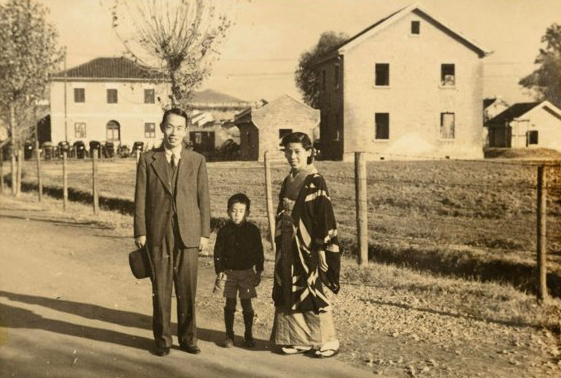
Takeo, Yasuo, and Mie Fukuda in Nanjing, China in 1942.

At the time of the Japanese surrender, Fukuda was chief secretary and head of the Minister's Secretariat. Masayoshi Ohira and Kiichi Miyazawa were his subordinates at that time. He became chief of the Banking Bureau in 1946 and by 1947 he had risen to chief of the Budget Bureau. Fukuda was in line to become administrative vice minister, however in 1948 he was arrested in connection to the Showa Denko scandal, a corruption scandal involving several bureaucrats, businessmen and politicians which precipitated the fall of the Ashida administration. Fukuda was later acquitted, but the incident led him to resign from the Ministry in 1950.

== Political career ==
In the 1952 election, Fukuda was elected as an independent to the House of Representatives, representing the third district of Gunma.

Fukuda grew close to Nobusuke Kishi, who was making a political comeback. He joined the Liberal Party along with Kishi in 1953 and when Kishi was expelled the following year Fukuda left with him and took part in forming the Democratic Party. Fukada became a prized lieutenant to Kishi.

The two parties merged to form the Liberal Democratic Party in 1955. After Kishi became prime minister, Fukuda became chairman of the Policy Research Council in 1958 and secretary-general in January 1959. Fukuda joined the cabinet in June as Minister of Agriculture, remaining until the Kishi was forced to resign as prime minister due to the massive 1960 Anpo protests against the U.S.-Japan Security treaty.

After that, Hayato Ikeda was elected as LDP president and prime minister with the support of Kishi and his brother Eisaku Satō. Fukuda again became chairman of the Policy Research Council in December 1960. Before long, the alliance between Ikeda, Kishi and Satō began to fray. Satō wanted to succeed Ikeda and Kishi was inclined to support him, but Ikeda intended to have a long-term administration. In the reshuffle of July 1961, Ikeda treated his former opponents Banboku Ōno and Ichirō Kōno generously to balance the influence of Kishi and Satō. Fukuda for his part lost his position as policy chairman.

In January 1962, Fukuda formed the "Party Spirit Renovation League" (Tōfū Sasshin Renmei), which became a forum for Diet members to air anti-Ikeda grievances. The Kishi faction began to split between those who opposed or supported Ikeda, led by Fukuda and Shojiro Kawashima respectively. Kishi disbanded the faction in July 1962 and all but the group close to Kawashima joined Fukuda, who became Kishi's de facto successor as factional leader.

Satō decided not to stand in the 1962 LDP leadership election and Ikeda successfully ran unopposed, but the 70 or so members of the Party Spirit Renovation League cast blank ballots in protest. In the 1964 leadership election Fukuda strongly supported Satō against Ikeda. Satō was defeated, but soon afterwards Ikeda fell ill and had to resign as prime minister, naming Satō as his successor.

Although Fukuda remained locked out of the cabinet during the Ikeda years, his star began to rise again under Satō. Fukuda rose to the prestigious posts of Minister of Finance (1965–66, 1968–71) and Minister of Foreign Affairs (1971–72). After Satō's third and final term as prime minister came to an end in 1972, Fukuda ran as a candidate to replace him but lost out to insurgent candidate Kakuei Tanaka. Under Tanaka, Fukuda once again served as Minister of Finance (1973–74), and even when the Tanaka cabinet fell due to a corruption scandal, Fukuda was seen as "clean" and served a stint as Director of the Economic Planning Agency under the ensuing cabinet of Takeo Miki (1974–76).

== Premiership (1976–1978) ==
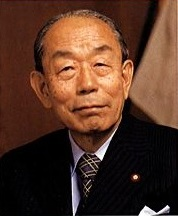
- Premiership of Takeo Fukuda; 24 December 1976 – 7 December 1978
- Monarch: Emperor Shōwa
- Cabinet: Takeo Fukuda Cabinet
- Party: Liberal Democratic
- Election: 1976
- Seat: Naikaku Sōri Daijin Kantei
- Constituency: Gunma 3rd
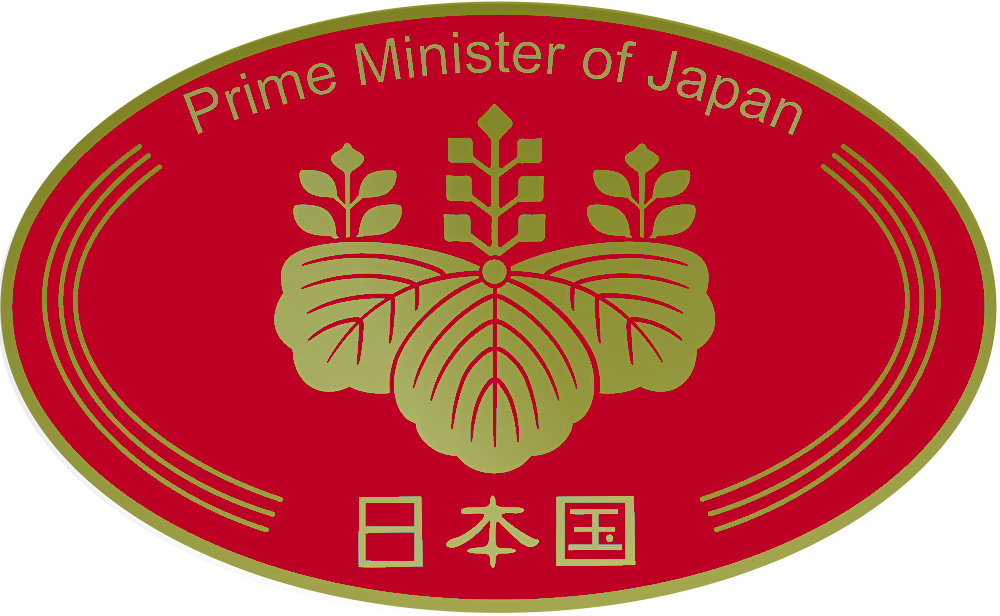
- Emblem of the Prime Minister of Japan

After the LDP's poor showing in the 1976 election, Miki stepped down as prime minister and Fukuda was elected to replace him. Fukuda remained in office until 1978, but was forced to rely on the support of minor parties to maintain a parliamentary majority. Although he was regarded as a conservative and a hawk on foreign policy, Fukuda drew international criticism when he caved in to the demands of a group of terrorists who hijacked Japan Airlines Flight 472, saying "Jinmei wa chikyū yori omoi (The value of a human life outweighs the Earth)."

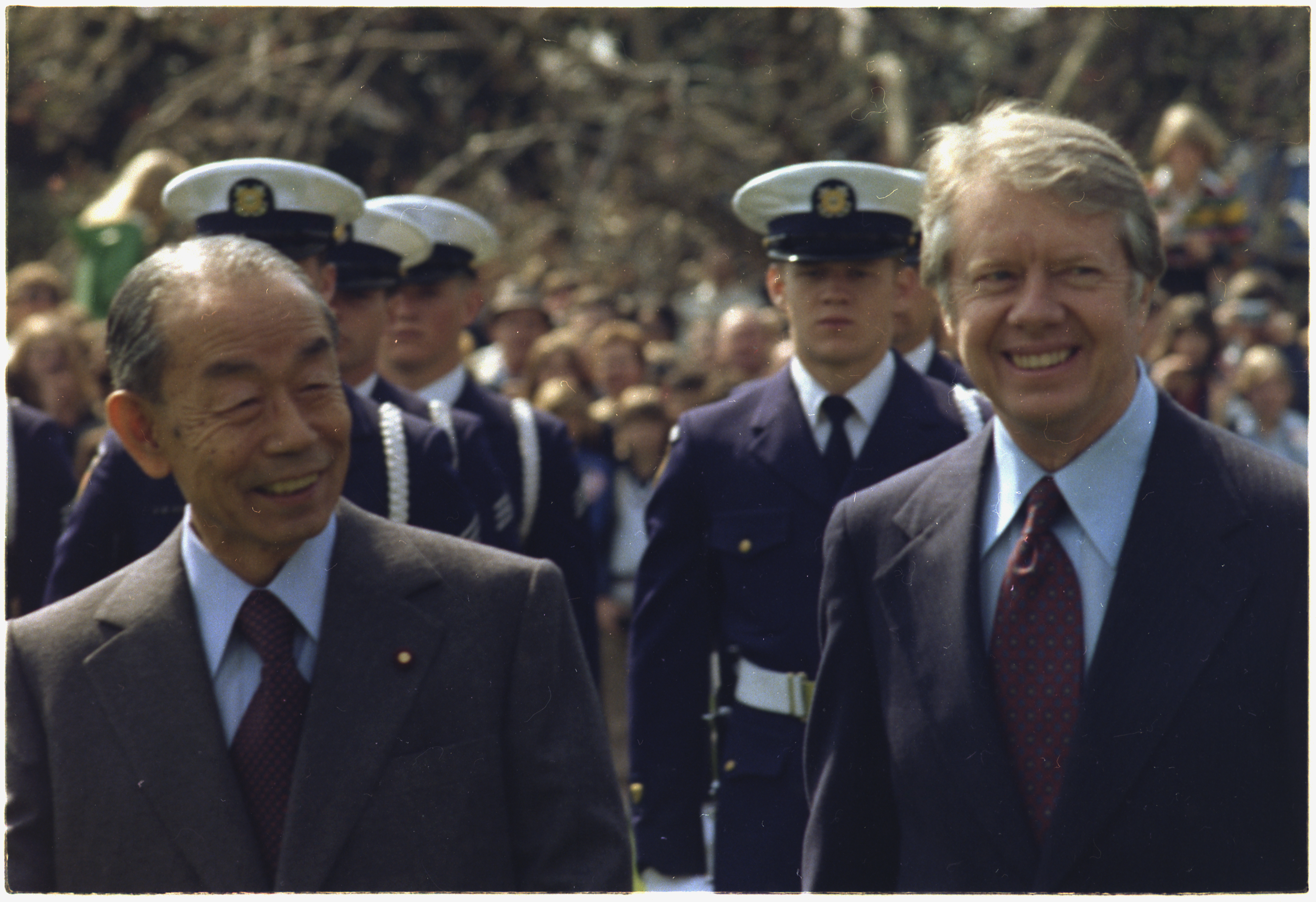
Fukuda with Jimmy Carter (21 March 1977)

In matters of Sino-Japanese relations, Fukuda began as one of the LDP's conservative pro-Taiwan voices. However, by the time he had become prime minister, he was forced to accommodate increasing calls within both the LDP as well as Japanese big business to further pursue peace treaty negotiations with the People's Republic of China in order to bring about increased access to trade in the long run. Fukuda stalled on this for a number of reasons. For one, there was still continued resistance among some in the LDP who were pro-Taiwan. Moreover, relations with the Soviet Union were only recently recovering from disputes over fisheries, and as China and the Soviet Union had strained relations, Fukuda was careful not to favour one too much over the other. The primary dispute, however, was China's insistence on the treaty to contain an "anti-hegemony clause" which Japan viewed as being directed towards the Soviet Union, and Fukuda did not wish Japan to become involved in the Sino-Soviet schism. After treaty discussions spent much time in limbo, the Chinese side eventually expressed flexibility on the anti-hegemony issue, and Fukuda gave the greenlight to pursue them. Before long, however, pro-Taiwan voices in the LDP placed intense pressure on the Fukuda, and further indecision led to Fukuda's approval ratings to dip down to 20%. Eventually, after further discussion, Fukuda finally consented to a modified version of the treaty which later became the Treaty of Peace and Friendship between Japan and China.

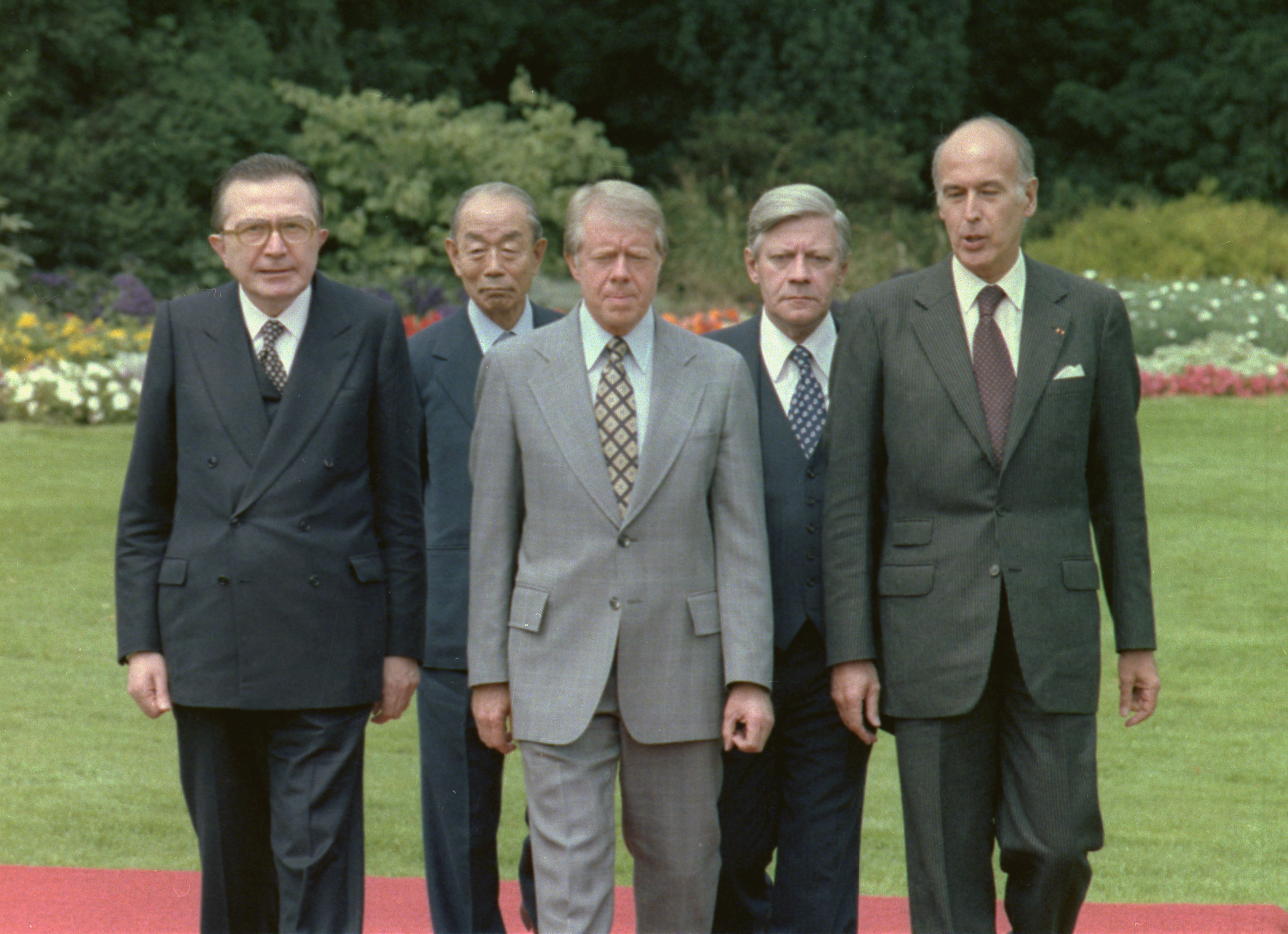
Fukuda with Giulio Andreotti, Jimmy Carter, Helmut Schmidt and Valéry Giscard d'Estaing (at the 4th G7 summit on 16 July 1978)

On 18 August 1977, Fukuda delivered an address at the ASEAN summit in Manila, which had been popularly dubbed as the "Fukuda Doctrine." In this speech, Fukuda was mainly concerned with three goals: overcoming the psychological barriers between Southeast Asia and Japan which came about due to World War II by reaffirming Japan's commitment to pacifism, increasing mutual "heart-to-heart" confidence between Japan and ASEAN countries, and the willingness of Japan to be an "equal partner" with ASEAN countries (rather than the economic giant it was feared as). In order to bolster these promises, Fukuda clarified Japanese willingness to provide for loans and development assistance, but under the condition that ASEAN does not require Japan to commit to joining an exclusivist trading block.

In an effort to end the LDP's faction system, Fukuda introduced primary elections within the party. In the first primary towards the end of 1978, he was beaten by Masayoshi Ōhira for the presidency of the LDP, and forced to resign as prime minister. Fukuda was later instrumental in the formation of the Inter Action Council. He retired from politics in 1990.

== Personal life ==
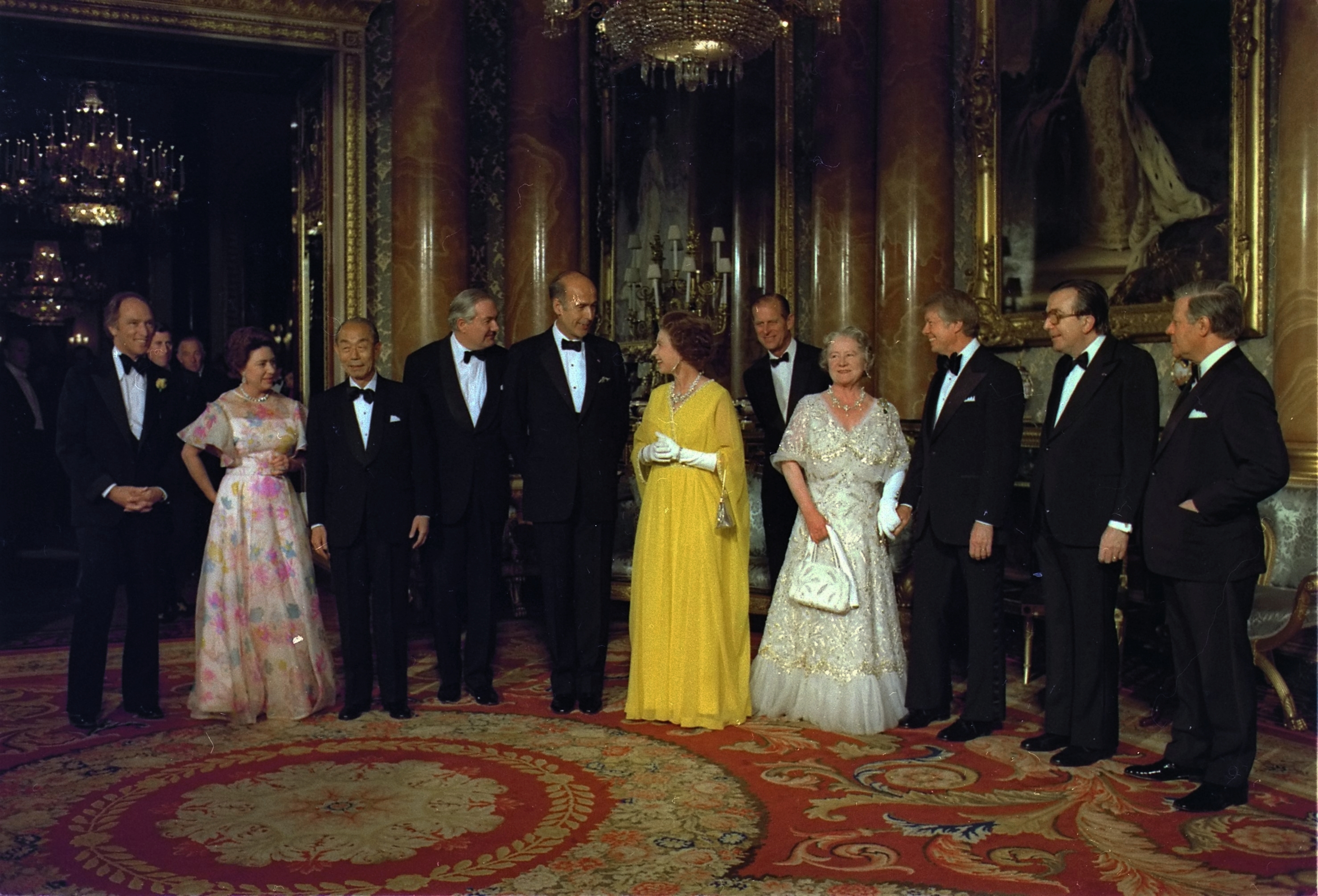
Fukuda with Princess Margaret, Queen Elizabeth II, Prince Philip, Queen Elizabeth The Queen Mother and the leaders of the G7 (in London on 13 May 1977)

Fukuda was married and had five children: three sons and two daughters. His eldest son, Yasuo Fukuda, became prime minister in September 2007, after the sudden resignation of Shinzō Abe, and remained in that office for one year, making him the first son of a Japanese prime minister to become a prime minister himself. In addition, Prime Minister Junichiro Koizumi began his political career as a secretary to Fukuda, and the two were very close in their political and personal lives from the 1970s onward (Fukuda was the best man at Koizumi's wedding).

In his 1977 speech delivered to ASEAN, Fukuda identified controversial Filipino dictator Ferdinand Marcos as a close friend of his.

=== Death ===
Fukuda died of chronic emphysema in the hospital of Tokyo Women's Medical College on 5 July 1995 at the age of 90.

== Honours ==
- Grand Cordon of the Order of the Chrysanthemum (5 July 1995; posthumous)
- Golden Pheasant Award of the Scout Association of Japan (1979)
- Senior Second Rank

Party political offices
Preceded by Takeo Miki	Chairman of the Policy Research Council, Liberal Democratic Party; 1958-1959	Succeeded by Umekichi Nakamura
Preceded by Shojiro Kawashima	Secretary-General of the Liberal Democratic Party; 1959	Succeeded by Shojiro Kawashima
Preceded by Shiina Etsusaburo	Chairman of the Policy Research Council, Liberal Democratic Party; 1960-1961	Succeeded by Kakuei Tanaka
Preceded by Kakuei Tanaka	Secretary-General of the Liberal Democratic Party; 1966-1968	Succeeded by Kakuei Tanaka
Preceded by Takeo Miki	President of the Liberal Democratic Party; 1976-1978	Succeeded by Masayoshi Ōhira
New title	Head of Seiwa Seisaku Kenkyūkai; 1979–1986	Succeeded by Shintaro Abe
Political offices
Preceded by Kunio Miuchi	Minister of Agriculture and Forestry; 1959–1960	Succeeded by Tokuo Nanjō
Preceded by Kakuei Tanaka	Minister of Finance; 1965-1966	Succeeded by Mikio Mizuta
Preceded by Mikio Mizuta	Minister of Finance; 1968–1971	Succeeded by Mikio Mizuta
Preceded by Kiichi Aichi	Minister of Foreign Affairs; 1971–1972	Succeeded by Masayoshi Ōhira
Preceded by Seigo Hamano	Head of the Administrative Management Agency; 1972–1973	Succeeded by Shigeru Hori
Preceded by Kakuei Tanaka; Interim	Minister of Finance; 1973–1974	Succeeded by Masayoshi Ōhira
Preceded by Tadashi Kuranari	Director of the Economic Planning Agency; 1974–1976	Succeeded by Uichi Noda
Preceded by Takeo Miki	Deputy Prime Minister of Japan; 1974–1976	Succeeded by Masayoshi Itō
Preceded by Takeo Miki	Prime Minister of Japan; 1976-1978	Succeeded by Masayoshi Ōhira
