= First Satō cabinet =

Cabinet of Japan (1964–1967)

First Satō Cabinet
- 61st Cabinet of Japan

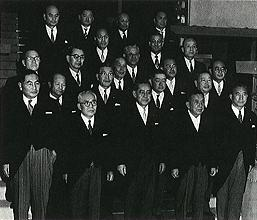
- Initial composition
- Date formed: November 9, 1964
- Date dissolved: February 17, 1967

People and organisations
- Emperor: Shōwa
- Prime Minister: Eisaku Satō
- Deputy Prime Minister: Ichirō Kōno (until June 3, 1965)
- Member party: Liberal Democratic Party
- Status in legislature: House of Representatives: Majority; House of Councillors: Majority
- Opposition parties: Japan Socialist Party; Democratic Socialist Party; Japanese Communist Party; Kōmeitō

History
- Election: 1965 councillors election
- Legislature term: 47th-55th National Diet
- Predecessor: Third Ikeda Cabinet
- Successor: Second Satō Cabinet

The First Satō Cabinet is the 61st Cabinet of Japan headed by Eisaku Satō from November 9, 1964 to February 17, 1967.

== Cabinet ==
Portfolio	Name	Political party	Term start	Term end
Prime Minister	Eisaku Satō	Liberal Democratic	November 9, 1964	February 17, 1967
Deputy Prime Minister; Minister in charge of Sports	Ichirō Kōno	Liberal Democratic	November 9, 1964	June 3, 1965
Minister of Justice	Hitoshi Takahashi	Liberal Democratic	November 9, 1964	June 3, 1965
Minister for Foreign Affairs	Etsusaburo Shiina	Liberal Democratic	November 9, 1964	December 3, 1966
Minister of Finance	Kakuei Tanaka	Liberal Democratic	November 9, 1964	June 3, 1965
Minister of Education; Director of the Science and Technology Agency	Kiichi Aichi	Liberal Democratic	November 9, 1964	June 3, 1965
Minister of Health	Hiroshi Kanda	Liberal Democratic	November 9, 1964	June 3, 1965
Minister of Agriculture, Forestry and Fisheries	Munenori Akagi	Liberal Democratic	November 9, 1964	June 3, 1965
Minister of International Trade and Industry	Yoshio Sakurauchi	Liberal Democratic	November 9, 1964	June 3, 1965
Minister of Transport	Shutarō Matsuura	Liberal Democratic	November 9, 1964	June 3, 1965
Minister of Posts	Jitsuzō Tokuyasu	Liberal Democratic	November 9, 1964	June 3, 1965
Minister of Labor	Hirohide Ishida	Liberal Democratic	November 9, 1964	June 3, 1965
Minister of Construction; Director of the Kinki Regional Development Agency; Chairman of the National Capital Region Development Commission	Osanori Koyama	Liberal Democratic	November 9, 1964	June 3, 1965
Minister of Home Affairs; Chairman of the National Public Safety Commission	Eichi Yoshitake	Liberal Democratic	November 9, 1964	June 3, 1965
Director of the Administrative Management Agency; Director of the Hokkaido Regional Development Agency	Keikichi Masuhara	Liberal Democratic	November 9, 1964	June 3, 1965
Director of the Defense Agency	Jun'ya Koizumi	Liberal Democratic	November 9, 1964	June 3, 1965
Director of the Economic Planning Agency	Mamoru Takahashi	Liberal Democratic	November 9, 1964	June 3, 1965
Chief Cabinet Secretary	Tomisaburō Hashimoto	Liberal Democratic	November 9, 1964	August 1, 1966
Director-General of the Prime Minister's Office	Sōichi Usui	Liberal Democratic	November 9, 1964	June 3, 1965
Director-General of the Cabinet Legislation Bureau	Masami Takatsuji	Independent	November 9, 1964	February 17, 1967
Deputy Chief Cabinet Secretary (Political Affairs)	Noboru Takeshita	Liberal Democratic	November 9, 1964	August 1, 1966
Deputy Chief Cabinet Secretary (General Affairs)	Minoru Ishioka	Independent	November 9, 1964	February 17, 1967
Deputy Director-General of the Prime Minister's Office	Tōru Furuya	Liberal Democratic	November 9, 1964	June 3, 1965

== First Cabinet reshuffle ==
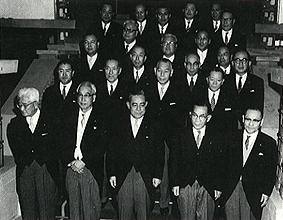
First Cabinet reshuffle

The first Cabinet reshuffle took place on June 3, 1965.

Portfolio	Name	Political party	Term start	Term end
Prime Minister	Eisaku Satō	Liberal Democratic	November 9, 1964	February 17, 1967
Minister of Justice	Mitsujirō Ishii	Liberal Democratic	June 3, 1965	December 3, 1966
Minister for Foreign Affairs	Etsusaburo Shiina	Liberal Democratic	November 9, 1964	December 3, 1966
Minister of Finance	Takeo Fukuda	Liberal Democratic	June 3, 1965	December 3, 1966
Minister of Education	Umekichi Nakamura	Liberal Democratic	June 3, 1965	August 1, 1966
Minister of Health	Zenkō Suzuki	Liberal Democratic	June 3, 1965	December 3, 1966
Minister of Agriculture, Forestry and Fisheries	Eiichi Sakata	Liberal Democratic	June 3, 1965	August 1, 1966
Minister of International Trade and Industry	Takeo Miki	Liberal Democratic	June 3, 1965	December 3, 1966
Minister of Transport	Torata Nakamura	Liberal Democratic	June 3, 1965	August 1, 1966
Minister of Posts	Yuichi Kōri	Liberal Democratic	June 3, 1965	August 1, 1966
Minister of Labor	Hisao Kodaira	Liberal Democratic	June 3, 1965	August 1, 1966
Minister of Construction; Director of the Kinki Regional Development Agency; Chairman of the National Capital Region Development Commission	Mitsuo Setoyama	Liberal Democratic	June 3, 1965	August 1, 1966
Director of the Chubu Regional Development and Maintenance Agency	Mitsuo Setoyama	Liberal Democratic	June 1, 1966	August 1, 1966
Minister of Home Affairs; Chairman of the National Public Safety Commission	Tadanori Nagayama	Liberal Democratic	June 3, 1965	August 1, 1966
Director of the Administrative Management Agency; Director of the Hokkaido Regional Development Agency	Tokuyasu Fukuda	Liberal Democratic	June 3, 1965	August 1, 1966
Director of the Defense Agency	Raizo Matsuno	Liberal Democratic	June 3, 1965	August 1, 1966
Director of the Economic Planning Agency	Aiichirō Fujiyama	Liberal Democratic	June 3, 1965	November 4, 1966
Director of the Science and Technology Agency	Shokichi Uehara	Liberal Democratic	June 3, 1965	August 1, 1966
Chief Cabinet Secretary	Tomisaburō Hashimoto	Liberal Democratic	November 9, 1964	August 1, 1966
Director-General of the Prime Minister's Office	Ken Yasui	Liberal Democratic	June 3, 1965	August 1, 1966
Director-General of the Cabinet Legislation Bureau	Masami Takatsuji	Independent	November 9, 1964	February 17, 1967
Deputy Chief Cabinet Secretary (Political Affairs)	Noboru Takeshita	Liberal Democratic	November 9, 1964	August 1, 1966
Deputy Chief Cabinet Secretary (General Affairs)	Minoru Ishioka	Independent	November 9, 1964	February 17, 1967
Deputy Director-General of the Prime Minister's Office (Political Affairs)	Kichizō Hosoda	Liberal Democratic	June 3, 1965	August 2, 1966
Deputy Director-General of the Prime Minister's Office (General Affairs)	Tōru Furuya	Liberal Democratic	June 3, 1965	November 22, 1966

== Second Cabinet reshuffle ==
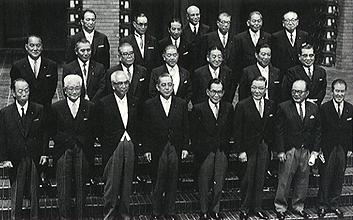
Second Cabinet reshuffle

The second Cabinet reshuffle took place on August 1, 1966.

Portfolio	Name	Political party	Term start	Term end
Prime Minister	Eisaku Satō	Liberal Democratic	November 9, 1964	February 17, 1967
Minister of Justice	Mitsujirō Ishii	Liberal Democratic	June 3, 1965	December 3, 1966
Minister for Foreign Affairs	Etsusaburo Shiina	Liberal Democratic	November 9, 1964	December 3, 1966
Minister of Finance	Takeo Fukuda	Liberal Democratic	June 3, 1965	December 3, 1966
Minister of Education; Director of the Science and Technology Agency	Kiichi Arita	Liberal Democratic	August 1, 1966	December 3, 1966
Minister of Health	Zenkō Suzuki	Liberal Democratic	June 3, 1965	December 3, 1966
Minister of Agriculture, Forestry and Fisheries	Raizo Matsuno	Liberal Democratic	August 1, 1966	December 3, 1966
Minister of International Trade and Industry	Takeo Miki	Liberal Democratic	June 3, 1965	December 3, 1966
Minister of Transport	Seijuro Arafune	Liberal Democratic	August 1, 1966	October 14, 1966
Minister of Transport	Sensuke Fujieda	Liberal Democratic	October 14, 1966	December 3, 1966
Minister of Posts	Torasaburō Shintani	Liberal Democratic	August 1, 1966	December 3, 1966
Minister of Labor	Mitsuo Yamate	Liberal Democratic	August 1, 1966	December 3, 1966
Minister of Construction; Director of the Kinki Regional Development Agency; Director of the Chubu Regional Development and Maintenance Agency; Chairman of the National Capital Region Development Commission	Tomisaburō Hashimoto	Liberal Democratic	August 1, 1966	December 3, 1966
Minister of Home Affairs; Chairman of the National Public Safety Commission	Shunji Shiomi	Liberal Democratic	August 1, 1966	December 3, 1966
Director of the Administrative Management Agency	Shigeho Tanaka	Liberal Democratic	August 1, 1966	December 3, 1966
Director of the Hokkaido Regional Development Agency	Shigesaburō Maeo	Liberal Democratic	August 1, 1966	December 3, 1966
Director of the Defense Agency	Eikichi Kanbayashiyama	Liberal Democratic	August 1, 1966	December 3, 1966
Director of the Economic Planning Agency	Aiichirō Fujiyama	Liberal Democratic	June 3, 1965	November 4, 1966
Director of the Economic Planning Agency	Eisaku Satō (acting)	Liberal Democratic	November 4, 1966	December 3, 1966
Chief Cabinet Secretary	Kiichi Aichi	Liberal Democratic	August 1, 1966	December 3, 1966
Director-General of the Prime Minister's Office	Kiyoshi Mori	Liberal Democratic	August 1, 1966	December 3, 1966
Director-General of the Cabinet Legislation Bureau	Masami Takatsuji	Independent	November 9, 1964	February 17, 1967
Deputy Chief Cabinet Secretary (Political Affairs)	Toshio Kimura	Liberal Democratic	August 1, 1966	February 17, 1967
Deputy Chief Cabinet Secretary (General Affairs)	Minoru Ishioka	Independent	November 9, 1964	February 17, 1967
Deputy Director-General of the Prime Minister's Office (Political Affairs)	Senichirō Uemura	Liberal Democratic	August 2, 1966	February 17, 1967
Deputy Director-General of the Prime Minister's Office (General Affairs)	Tōru Furuya	Liberal Democratic	June 3, 1965	November 22, 1966
Deputy Director-General of the Prime Minister's Office (General Affairs)	Hideo Hori	Independent	November 22, 1966	February 17, 1967

== Third Cabinet reshuffle ==
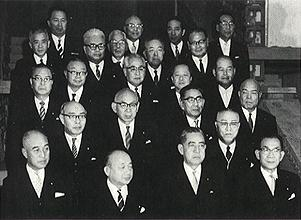
Third Cabinet reshuffle

The third Cabinet reshuffle took place on December 3, 1966.

Portfolio	Name	Political party	Term start	Term end
Prime Minister	Eisaku Satō	Liberal Democratic	November 9, 1964	February 17, 1967
Minister of Justice	Isaji Tanaka	Liberal Democratic	December 3, 1966	February 17, 1967
Minister for Foreign Affairs	Takeo Miki	Liberal Democratic	December 3, 1966	February 17, 1967
Minister of Finance	Mikio Mizuta	Liberal Democratic	December 3, 1966	February 17, 1967
Minister of Education	Toshihiro Kennoki	Liberal Democratic	December 3, 1966	February 17, 1967
Minister of Health	Hideo Bō	Liberal Democratic	December 3, 1966	February 17, 1967
Minister of Agriculture, Forestry and Fisheries	Tadao Kuraishi	Liberal Democratic	December 3, 1966	February 17, 1967
Minister of International Trade and Industry	Watarō Kanno	Liberal Democratic	December 3, 1966	February 17, 1967
Minister of Transport	Takeo Ōhashi	Liberal Democratic	December 3, 1966	February 17, 1967
Minister of Posts	Takeji Kobayashi	Liberal Democratic	December 3, 1966	February 17, 1967
Minister of Labor	Takashi Hayakawa	Liberal Democratic	December 3, 1966	February 17, 1967
Minister of Construction; Director of the Kinki Regional Development Agency; Director of the Chubu Regional Development and Maintenance Agency; Chairman of the National Capital Region Development Commission	Eiichi Nishimura	Liberal Democratic	December 3, 1966	February 17, 1967
Minister of Home Affairs; Chairman of the National Public Safety Commission	Sensuke Fujieda	Liberal Democratic	December 3, 1966	February 17, 1967
Director of the Administrative Management Agency	Isao Matsudaira	Liberal Democratic	December 3, 1966	February 17, 1967
Director of the Hokkaido Regional Development Agency; Director of the Science and Technology Agency	Susumu Nikaidō	Liberal Democratic	December 3, 1966	February 17, 1967
Director of the Defense Agency	Kaneshichi Masuda	Liberal Democratic	December 3, 1966	February 17, 1967
Director of the Economic Planning Agency	Kiichi Miyazawa	Liberal Democratic	December 3, 1966	February 17, 1967
Chief Cabinet Secretary	Kenji Fukunaga	Liberal Democratic	December 3, 1966	February 17, 1967
Director-General of the Prime Minister's Office	Toshio Tsukahara	Liberal Democratic	December 3, 1966	February 17, 1967
Director-General of the Cabinet Legislation Bureau	Masami Takatsuji	Independent	November 9, 1964	February 17, 1967
Deputy Chief Cabinet Secretary (Political Affairs)	Toshio Kimura	Liberal Democratic	August 1, 1966	February 17, 1967
Deputy Chief Cabinet Secretary (General Affairs)	Minoru Ishioka	Independent	November 9, 1964	February 17, 1967
Deputy Director-General of the Prime Minister's Office (Political Affairs)	Senichirō Uemura	Liberal Democratic	August 2, 1966	February 17, 1967
Deputy Director-General of the Prime Minister's Office (General Affairs)	Hideo Hori	Independent	November 22, 1966	February 17, 1967
