= Third Ikeda cabinet =

Cabinet of Japan (1963–1964)

Third Ikeda Cabinet
- 60th Cabinet of Japan

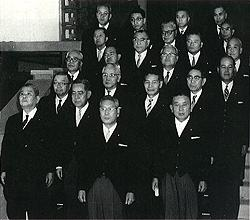
- Initial composition
- Date formed: December 9, 1963
- Date dissolved: November 9, 1964

People and organisations
- Emperor: Shōwa
- Prime Minister: Hayato Ikeda
- Deputy Prime Minister: Ichirō Kōno (from July 18, 1964)
- Member party: Liberal Democratic Party
- Status in legislature: House of Representatives: Majority; House of Councillors: Majority
- Opposition parties: Japan Socialist Party; Democratic Socialist Party; Japanese Communist Party; Kōmeitō

History
- Election: 1963 general election
- Legislature term: 45th-47th National Diet
- Predecessor: Second Ikeda Cabinet
- Successor: First Satō Cabinet

The Third Ikeda Cabinet is the 60th Cabinet of Japan headed by Hayato Ikeda from December 9, 1963, to November 9, 1964.

== Cabinet ==
| Portfolio | Name | Political party | Term start | Term end |
|---|---|---|---|---|
| Prime Minister | Hayato Ikeda | Liberal Democratic | December 9, 1963 | November 9, 1964 |
| Minister of Justice | Okinori Kaya | Liberal Democratic | December 9, 1963 | July 18, 1964 |
| Minister for Foreign Affairs | Masayoshi Ōhira | Liberal Democratic | December 9, 1963 | July 18, 1964 |
| Minister of Finance | Kakuei Tanaka | Liberal Democratic | December 9, 1963 | November 9, 1964 |
| Minister of Education | Hirokichi Nadao | Liberal Democratic | December 9, 1963 | July 18, 1964 |
| Minister of Health | Takeji Kobayashi | Liberal Democratic | December 9, 1963 | July 18, 1964 |
| Minister of Agriculture, Forestry and Fisheries | Munenori Akagi | Liberal Democratic | December 9, 1963 | November 9, 1964 |
| Minister of International Trade and Industry | Hajime Fukuda | Liberal Democratic | December 9, 1963 | July 18, 1964 |
| Minister of Transport | Kentarō Ayabe | Liberal Democratic | December 9, 1963 | July 18, 1964 |
| Minister of Posts | Shinzō Koike | Liberal Democratic | December 9, 1963 | July 18, 1964 |
| Minister of Labor | Takeo Ōhashi | Liberal Democratic | December 9, 1963 | July 18, 1964 |
| Minister of Construction Director of the Kinki Regional Development Agency Chair of the National Capital Region Development Commission | Ichirō Kōno | Liberal Democratic | December 9, 1963 | July 18, 1964 |
| Minister of Home Affairs Chair of the National Public Safety Commission | Takashi Hayakawa | Liberal Democratic | December 9, 1963 | March 25, 1964 |
| Minister of Home Affairs Chair of the National Public Safety Commission | Masamichi Akazawa | Liberal Democratic | March 25, 1964 | July 18, 1964 |
| Director of the Administrative Management Agency | Shinjirō Yamamura | Liberal Democratic | December 9, 1963 | July 18, 1964 |
| Director of the Hokkaido Regional Development Agency Director of the Science and Technology Agency | Eisaku Satō | Liberal Democratic | December 9, 1963 | June 29, 1964 |
| Director of the Hokkaido Regional Development Agency Director of the Science and Technology Agency | Hayato Ikeda | Liberal Democratic | June 29, 1964 | July 18, 1964 |
| Director of the Defense Agency | Tokuyasu Fukuda | Liberal Democratic | December 9, 1963 | July 18, 1964 |
| Director of the Economic Planning Agency | Kiichi Miyazawa | Liberal Democratic | December 9, 1963 | July 18, 1964 |
| Chief Cabinet Secretary | Yasumi Kurogane | Liberal Democratic | December 9, 1963 | July 18, 1964 |
| Director-General of the Prime Minister's Office | Takeo Noda | Liberal Democratic | December 9, 1963 | July 18, 1964 |
| Director-General of the Cabinet Legislation Bureau | Shūzō Hayashi | Independent | December 9, 1963 | November 9, 1964 |
| Deputy Chief Cabinet Secretary (Political Affairs) | Ichirōbei Kusano | Liberal Democratic | December 9, 1963 | July 24, 1964 |
| Deputy Chief Cabinet Secretary (General Affairs) | Kiichi Hosoya | Independent | December 9, 1963 | July 28, 1964 |
| Deputy Chief Cabinet Secretary (Prime Minister's Office) | Tōru Furuya | Liberal Democratic | December 9, 1963 | November 9, 1964 |

== Reshuffled Cabinet ==
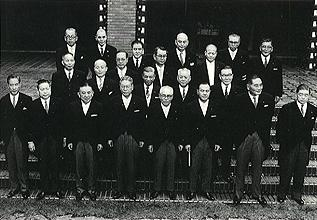
Cabinet reshuffle

A Cabinet reshuffle took place on July 18, 1964.

| Portfolio | Name | Political party | Term start | Term end |
|---|---|---|---|---|
| Prime Minister | Hayato Ikeda | Liberal Democratic | December 9, 1963 | November 9, 1964 |
| Deputy Prime Minister Minister in charge of the Tokyo Olympics | Ichirō Kōno | Liberal Democratic | July 18, 1964 | November 9, 1964 |
| Minister of Justice | Hitoshi Takahashi | Liberal Democratic | July 18, 1964 | November 9, 1964 |
| Minister for Foreign Affairs | Etsusaburo Shiina | Liberal Democratic | July 18, 1964 | November 9, 1964 |
| Minister of Finance | Kakuei Tanaka | Liberal Democratic | December 9, 1963 | November 9, 1964 |
| Minister of Education Director of the Science and Technology Agency | Kiichi Aichi | Liberal Democratic | July 18, 1964 | November 9, 1964 |
| Minister of Health | Hiroshi Kanda | Liberal Democratic | July 18, 1964 | November 9, 1964 |
| Minister of Agriculture, Forestry and Fisheries | Munenori Akagi | Liberal Democratic | December 9, 1963 | November 9, 1964 |
| Minister of International Trade and Industry | Yoshio Sakurauchi | Liberal Democratic | July 18, 1964 | November 9, 1964 |
| Minister of Transport | Shutarō Matsuura | Liberal Democratic | July 18, 1964 | November 9, 1964 |
| Minister of Posts | Jitsuzō Tokuyasu | Liberal Democratic | July 18, 1964 | November 9, 1964 |
| Minister of Labor | Hirohide Ishida | Liberal Democratic | July 18, 1964 | November 9, 1964 |
| Minister of Construction Director of the Kinki Regional Development Agency Chair of the National Capital Region Development Commission | Osanori Koyama | Liberal Democratic | July 18, 1964 | November 9, 1964 |
| Minister of Home Affairs Chair of the National Public Safety Commission | Eichi Yoshitake | Liberal Democratic | July 18, 1964 | March 25, 1964 |
| Director of the Administrative Management Agency Director of the Hokkaido Regional Development Agency | Keikichi Masuhara | Liberal Democratic | July 18, 1964 | November 9, 1964 |
| Director of the Defense Agency | Jun'ya Koizumi | Liberal Democratic | July 18, 1964 | November 9, 1964 |
| Director of the Economic Planning Agency | Mamoru Takahashi | Liberal Democratic | July 18, 1964 | November 9, 1964 |
| Chief Cabinet Secretary | Zenkō Suzuki | Liberal Democratic | July 18, 1964 | November 9, 1964 |
| Director-General of the Prime Minister's Office | Sōichi Usui | Liberal Democratic | July 18, 1964 | November 9, 1964 |
| Director-General of the Cabinet Legislation Bureau | Shūzō Hayashi | Independent | December 9, 1963 | November 9, 1964 |
| Deputy Chief Cabinet Secretary (Political Affairs) | Kunikichi Saitō | Liberal Democratic | July 24, 1964 | November 9, 1964 |
| Deputy Chief Cabinet Secretary (General Affairs) | Minoru Ishioka | Independent | July 28, 1964 | November 9, 1964 |
| Deputy Chief Cabinet Secretary (Prime Minister's Office) | Tōru Furuya | Liberal Democratic | December 9, 1963 | November 9, 1964 |
