= Second Satō cabinet =

Cabinet of Japan (1967–1970)

Second Satō Cabinet
- 62nd Cabinet of Japan

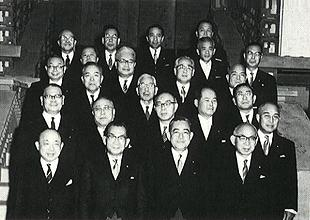
- Initial composition
- Date formed: February 17, 1967
- Date dissolved: January 14, 1970

People and organisations
- Emperor: Shōwa
- Prime Minister: Eisaku Satō
- Member party: Liberal Democratic Party
- Status in legislature: House of Representatives: Majority; House of Councillors: Majority
- Opposition parties: Japan Socialist Party; Kōmeitō; Democratic Socialist Party; Japanese Communist Party

History
- Elections: 1967 general election 1968 councillors election
- Legislature term: 55th-62nd National Diet
- Predecessor: First Satō Cabinet
- Successor: Third Satō Cabinet

The Second Satō Cabinet is the 62nd Cabinet of Japan headed by Eisaku Satō from February 17, 1967 to January 14, 1970.

== Cabinet ==
| Portfolio | Name | Political party | Term start | Term end |
|---|---|---|---|---|
| Prime Minister | Eisaku Satō | Liberal Democratic | February 17, 1967 | January 14, 1970 |
| Minister of Justice | Isaji Tanaka | Liberal Democratic | February 17, 1967 | November 25, 1967 |
| Minister for Foreign Affairs | Takeo Miki | Liberal Democratic | February 17, 1967 | October 28, 1968 |
| Minister of Finance | Mikio Mizuta | Liberal Democratic | February 17, 1967 | November 30, 1968 |
| Minister of Education | Toshihiro Kennoki | Liberal Democratic | February 17, 1967 | November 25, 1967 |
| Minister of Health | Hideo Bō | Liberal Democratic | February 17, 1967 | November 25, 1967 |
| Minister of Agriculture, Forestry and Fisheries | Tadao Kuraishi | Liberal Democratic | February 17, 1967 | February 22, 1968 |
| Minister of International Trade and Industry | Watarō Kanno | Liberal Democratic | February 17, 1967 | November 25, 1967 |
| Minister of Transport | Takeo Ōhashi | Liberal Democratic | February 17, 1967 | November 25, 1967 |
| Minister of Posts | Takeji Kobayashi | Liberal Democratic | February 17, 1967 | November 30, 1968 |
| Minister of Labor | Takashi Hayakawa | Liberal Democratic | February 17, 1967 | November 25, 1967 |
| Minister of Construction; Director of the Kinki Regional Development Agency; Director of the Chubu Regional Development and Maintenance Agency; Chairman of the National Capital Region Development Commission | Eiichi Nishimura | Liberal Democratic | February 17, 1967 | November 25, 1967 |
| Minister of Home Affairs; Chairman of the National Public Safety Commission | Sensuke Fujieda | Liberal Democratic | February 17, 1967 | November 25, 1967 |
| Director of the Administrative Management Agency | Isao Matsudaira | Liberal Democratic | February 17, 1967 | November 25, 1967 |
| Director of the Hokkaido Regional Development Agency; Director of the Science and Technology Agency | Susumu Nikaidō | Liberal Democratic | February 17, 1967 | November 25, 1967 |
| Director of the Defense Agency | Kaneshichi Masuda | Liberal Democratic | February 17, 1967 | November 30, 1968 |
| Director of the Economic Planning Agency | Kiichi Miyazawa | Liberal Democratic | February 17, 1967 | November 30, 1968 |
| Chief Cabinet Secretary | Kenji Fukunaga | Liberal Democratic | February 17, 1967 | June 21, 1967 |
| Chief Cabinet Secretary | Toshio Kimura | Liberal Democratic | June 22, 1967 | November 30, 1968 |
| Director-General of the Prime Minister's Office | Toshio Tsukahara | Liberal Democratic | February 17, 1967 | November 25, 1967 |
| Director-General of the Cabinet Legislation Bureau | Masami Takatsuji | Independent | February 17, 1967 | January 14, 1970 |
| Deputy Chief Cabinet Secretary (Political Affairs) | Toshio Kimura | Liberal Democratic | February 17, 1967 | June 21, 1967 |
| Deputy Chief Cabinet Secretary (Political Affairs) | Takao Kameoka | Liberal Democratic | June 22, 1967 | November 30, 1968 |
| Deputy Chief Cabinet Secretary (General Affairs) | Minoru Ishioka | Independent | February 17, 1967 | January 14, 1970 |
| Deputy Director-General of the Prime Minister's Office (Political Affairs) | Senichirō Uemura | Liberal Democratic | February 17, 1967 | November 28, 1967 |
| Deputy Director-General of the Prime Minister's Office (General Affairs) | Hideo Hori | Independent | February 17, 1967 | February 2, 1968 |

== First Cabinet reshuffle ==
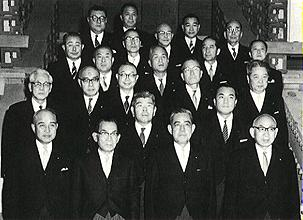
First Cabinet reshuffle

The first Cabinet reshuffle took place on November 25, 1967.

| Portfolio | Name | Political party | Term start | Term end |
|---|---|---|---|---|
| Prime Minister | Eisaku Satō | Liberal Democratic | February 17, 1967 | January 14, 1970 |
| Minister of Justice | Bunzō Akama | Liberal Democratic | November 25, 1967 | November 30, 1968 |
| Minister for Foreign Affairs | Takeo Miki | Liberal Democratic | February 17, 1967 | October 28, 1968 |
| Minister for Foreign Affairs | Eisaku Satō (acting) | Liberal Democratic | October 29, 1968 | November 30, 1968 |
| Minister of Finance | Mikio Mizuta | Liberal Democratic | February 17, 1967 | November 30, 1968 |
| Minister of Education | Hirokichi Nadao | Liberal Democratic | November 25, 1967 | November 30, 1968 |
| Minister of Health | Sunao Sonoda | Liberal Democratic | November 25, 1967 | November 30, 1968 |
| Minister of Agriculture, Forestry and Fisheries | Tadao Kuraishi | Liberal Democratic | February 17, 1967 | February 22, 1968 |
| Minister of Agriculture, Forestry and Fisheries | Naomi Nishimura | Liberal Democratic | February 23, 1968 | November 30, 1968 |
| Minister of International Trade and Industry | Etsusaburo Shiina | Liberal Democratic | November 25, 1967 | November 30, 1968 |
| Minister of Transport | Yasuhiro Nakasone | Liberal Democratic | November 25, 1967 | November 30, 1968 |
| Minister of Posts | Takeji Kobayashi | Liberal Democratic | February 17, 1967 | November 30, 1968 |
| Minister of Labor | Heiji Ogawa | Liberal Democratic | November 25, 1967 | November 30, 1968 |
| Minister of Construction; Director of the Kinki Regional Development Agency; Director of the Chubu Regional Development and Maintenance Agency; Chairman of the National Capital Region Development Commission | Shigeru Hori | Liberal Democratic | November 25, 1967 | November 30, 1968 |
| Minister of Home Affairs; Chairman of the National Public Safety Commission | Masamichi Akazawa | Liberal Democratic | November 25, 1967 | November 30, 1968 |
| Director of the Administrative Management Agency; Director of the Hokkaido Regional Development Agency | Takeo Kimura | Liberal Democratic | November 25, 1967 | November 30, 1968 |
| Director of the Defense Agency | Kaneshichi Masuda | Liberal Democratic | February 17, 1967 | November 30, 1968 |
| Director of the Economic Planning Agency | Kiichi Miyazawa | Liberal Democratic | February 17, 1967 | November 30, 1968 |
| Director of the Science and Technology Agency | Naotsugu Nabeshima | Liberal Democratic | November 25, 1967 | November 30, 1968 |
| Chief Cabinet Secretary | Toshio Kimura | Liberal Democratic | June 22, 1967 | November 30, 1968 |
| Director-General of the Prime Minister's Office | Tatsuo Tanaka | Liberal Democratic | November 25, 1967 | November 30, 1968 |
| Director-General of the Cabinet Legislation Bureau | Masami Takatsuji | Independent | February 17, 1967 | January 14, 1970 |
| Deputy Chief Cabinet Secretary (Political Affairs) | Takao Kameoka | Liberal Democratic | June 22, 1967 | November 30, 1968 |
| Deputy Chief Cabinet Secretary (General Affairs) | Minoru Ishioka | Independent | February 17, 1967 | January 14, 1970 |
| Deputy Director-General of the Prime Minister's Office (Political Affairs) | Tetsuo Yagi | Liberal Democratic | November 28, 1967 | December 3, 1968 |
| Deputy Director-General of the Prime Minister's Office (General Affairs) | Hideo Hori | Independent | February 17, 1967 | February 2, 1968 |
| Deputy Director-General of the Prime Minister's Office (General Affairs) | Kyosuke Hirotsu | Independent | February 2, 1968 | August 12, 1969 |

== Second Cabinet reshuffle ==
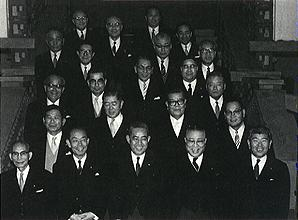
Second Cabinet reshuffle

The second Cabinet reshuffle took place on November 30, 1968.

| Portfolio | Name | Political party | Term start | Term end |
|---|---|---|---|---|
| Prime Minister | Eisaku Satō | Liberal Democratic | February 17, 1967 | January 14, 1970 |
| Minister of Justice | Kichinosuke Saigo | Liberal Democratic | November 30, 1968 | January 14, 1970 |
| Minister for Foreign Affairs | Kiichi Aichi | Liberal Democratic | November 30, 1968 | January 14, 1970 |
| Minister of Finance | Takeo Fukuda | Liberal Democratic | November 30, 1968 | January 14, 1970 |
| Minister of Education | Michita Sakata | Liberal Democratic | November 30, 1968 | January 14, 1970 |
| Minister of Health | Noboru Saitō | Liberal Democratic | November 30, 1968 | January 14, 1970 |
| Minister of Agriculture, Forestry and Fisheries | Shirō Hasegawa | Liberal Democratic | November 30, 1968 | January 14, 1970 |
| Minister of International Trade and Industry | Masayoshi Ōhira | Liberal Democratic | November 30, 1968 | January 14, 1970 |
| Minister of Transport | Ken Harada | Liberal Democratic | November 30, 1968 | January 14, 1970 |
| Minister of Posts | Toshio Kōmoto | Liberal Democratic | November 30, 1968 | January 14, 1970 |
| Minister of Labor | Kenzaburo Hara | Liberal Democratic | November 30, 1968 | January 14, 1970 |
| Minister of Construction; Director of the Kinki Regional Development Agency; Director of the Chubu Regional Development and Maintenance Agency; Chairman of the National Capital Region Development Commission | Shinzō Tsubokawa | Liberal Democratic | November 30, 1968 | January 14, 1970 |
| Minister of Home Affairs; Chairman of the National Public Safety Commission | Takeo Noda | Liberal Democratic | November 30, 1968 | January 14, 1970 |
| Director of the Administrative Management Agency; Director of the Hokkaido Regional Development Agency | Masuo Araki | Liberal Democratic | November 30, 1968 | January 14, 1970 |
| Director of the Defense Agency | Kiichi Arita | Liberal Democratic | November 30, 1968 | January 14, 1970 |
| Director of the Economic Planning Agency | Watarō Kanno | Liberal Democratic | November 30, 1968 | January 14, 1970 |
| Director of the Science and Technology Agency | Shirō Kiuchi | Liberal Democratic | November 30, 1968 | January 14, 1970 |
| Chief Cabinet Secretary | Shigeru Hori | Liberal Democratic | November 30, 1968 | January 14, 1970 |
| Director-General of the Prime Minister's Office | Tokuji Tokonami | Liberal Democratic | November 30, 1968 | January 14, 1970 |
| Director-General of the Cabinet Legislation Bureau | Masami Takatsuji | Independent | February 17, 1967 | January 14, 1970 |
| Deputy Chief Cabinet Secretary (Political Affairs) | Toshio Kimura | Liberal Democratic | November 30, 1968 | January 14, 1970 |
| Deputy Chief Cabinet Secretary (General Affairs) | Minoru Ishioka | Independent | February 17, 1967 | January 14, 1970 |
| Deputy Director-General of the Prime Minister's Office (Political Affairs) | Hyōsuke Kujiraoka | Liberal Democratic | December 3, 1968 | January 14, 1970 |
| Deputy Director-General of the Prime Minister's Office (General Affairs) | Kyosuke Hirotsu | Independent | February 2, 1968 | August 12, 1969 |
| Deputy Director-General of the Prime Minister's Office (General Affairs) | Norio Iwakura | Independent | August 12, 1969 | January 14, 1970 |
