= Satō Cabinet =

Satō Cabinet may refer to:

- First Satō Cabinet, the Japanese majority government led by Eisaku Satō from 1964 to 1967
- Second Satō Cabinet, the Japanese majority government led by Eisaku Satō from 1967 to 1970
- Third Satō Cabinet, the Japanese majority government led by Eisaku Satō from 1970 to 1972
