= Kiichi Aichi =

Japanese politician

- 愛知 揆一
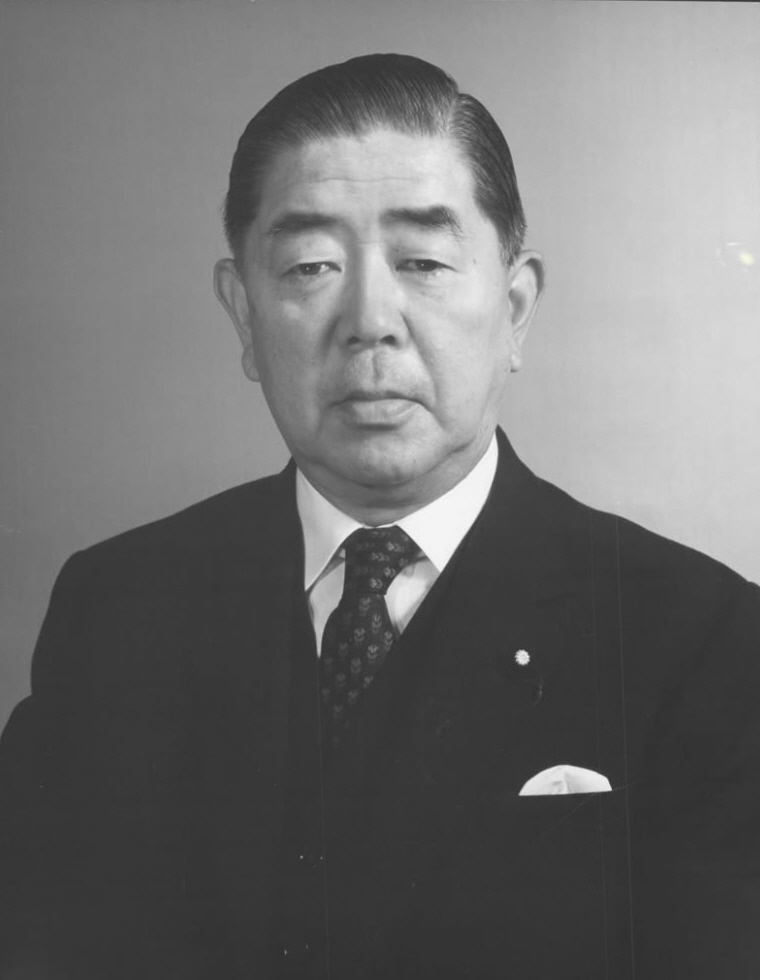
- Aichi in 1971

Minister of Finance
- In office 22 December 1972 – 23 November 1973
- Prime Minister: Kakuei Tanaka
- Preceded by: Koshiro Ueki
- Succeeded by: Takeo Fukuda

Minister for Foreign Affairs
- In office 30 November 1968 – 5 July 1971
- Prime Minister: Eisaku Satō
- Preceded by: Eisaku Satō
- Succeeded by: Takeo Fukuda
Ministerial offices
Chief Cabinet Secretary
In office 1 August 1966 – 3 December 1966
Prime Minister	Eisaku Satō
Preceded by	Tomisaburō Hashimoto
Succeeded by	Kenji Fukunaga
In office 10 July 1957 – 12 June 1958
Prime Minister	Nobusuke Kishi
Preceded by	Hirohide Ishida
Succeeded by	Munenori Akagi
Minister of Education
In office 18 July 1964 – 3 June 1965
Prime Minister	Hayato Ikeda; Eisaku Satō
Preceded by	Hirokichi Nadao
Succeeded by	Umekichi Nakamura
Director-General of the Science and Technology Agency
In office 18 July 1964 – 3 June 1965
Prime Minister	Hayato Ikeda; Eisaku Satō
Preceded by	Eisaku Satō; Hayato Ikeda (acting)
Succeeded by	Shōkichi Uehara
Minister of Justice
In office 28 October 1958 – 12 January 1959
Prime Minister	Nobusuke Kishi
Preceded by	Toshiki Karasawa
Succeeded by	Hiroya Ino
Director-General of the Autonomy Agency
In office 28 October 1958 – 12 January 1959
Prime Minister	Nobusuke Kishi
Preceded by	Masashi Aoki
Succeeded by	Masashi Aoki
Minister of International Trade and Industry
In office 9 January 1954 – 10 December 1954
Prime Minister	Shigeru Yoshida
Preceded by	Kiyohide Okano
Succeeded by	Tanzan Ishibashi
Director-General of the Economic Deliberation Agency
In office 9 January 1954 – 10 December 1954
Prime Minister	Shigeru Yoshida
Preceded by	Kiyohide Okano
Succeeded by	Tatsunosuke Takasaki

Member of the House of Representatives
- In office 28 February 1955 – 23 November 1973
- Preceded by: Ichirō Shōji
- Succeeded by: Kazuo Aichi
- Constituency: Miyagi 1st

Member of the House of Councillors
- In office 5 June 1950 – 1 February 1955
- Preceded by: Constituency established
- Succeeded by: Multi-member district
- Constituency: National district

Personal details
- Born: 10 October 1907 Chiyoda, Tokyo, Japan
- Died: 23 November 1973 (aged 66) Shinjuku, Tokyo, Japan
- Party: Liberal Democratic (1955–1973)
- Other political affiliations: Liberal (1950–1955)
- Relatives: Kazuo Aichi (son-in-law); Jiro Aichi (grandson)
- Education: Tokyo Imperial University

Kiichi Aichi (愛知 揆一, Aichi Kiichi; 10 October 1907 – 23 November 1973) was a Japanese politician and cabinet minister in post-war Japan. He held several cabinet-level positions throughout his career, including Minister for Foreign Affairs, Minister of Finance and Minister of Education. He notably negotiated and signed the Okinawa Reversion Agreement with the United States on behalf of then Japanese prime minister Eisaku Satō in 1971.

== Early life and education ==
Aichi was born in Kōjimachi Ward, Tokyo (now Chiyoda Ward) as the eldest son of Keiichi and Yoshiaki Aichi. His family moved to Sendai after his father, Keiichi, became a professor of physics at Tohoku Imperial University in 1911. His mother, Yoshiaki, was from a family of Chinese scholars, and the entire family was said to be a scholarly family.

Aichi attended the former Miyagi Prefectural Second Junior High School (now Sendai Second High School) and the former Second High School, before studying political science at Tokyo Imperial University, graduating in 1931. During his time at the second junior high school, he was a member of the judo club. He was known as a brilliant student, and in junior high school he competed with his classmate Masao Okahara, who later became the Chief Justice of the Supreme Court, for the top grades. He studied under the great masters of criminal law Eiichi Makino and civil law Sakae Wagatsuma during his time at the Faculty of Law at Tokyo Imperial University. He received 15 "excellent" grades, even though 10 was considered a genius.

When he was in his third year of junior high school, his father Keiichi died from food poisoning at the age of 42 from eating fugu.

== Bureaucratic career ==
After graduating from Tokyo Imperial University, he joined the Ministry of Finance and was assigned to the Banking Bureau. He was stationed in the United Kingdom and France as a financial secretary, and as secretary to the Minister of Finance Eiichi Baba. In 1947 he became the Director-General of the Banking Bureau, and worked hard to protect Japan's financial sector as the GHQ broke up the zaibatsus. In 1948, while he was Director-General of the Banking Bureau, he was summoned to testify along with Hayato Ikeda and Zentarō Kosaka before the House of Representatives Special Committee on Investigation of Unfair Property Transactions in relation to loans issued for the Takenaka Corporation.

== Political career ==
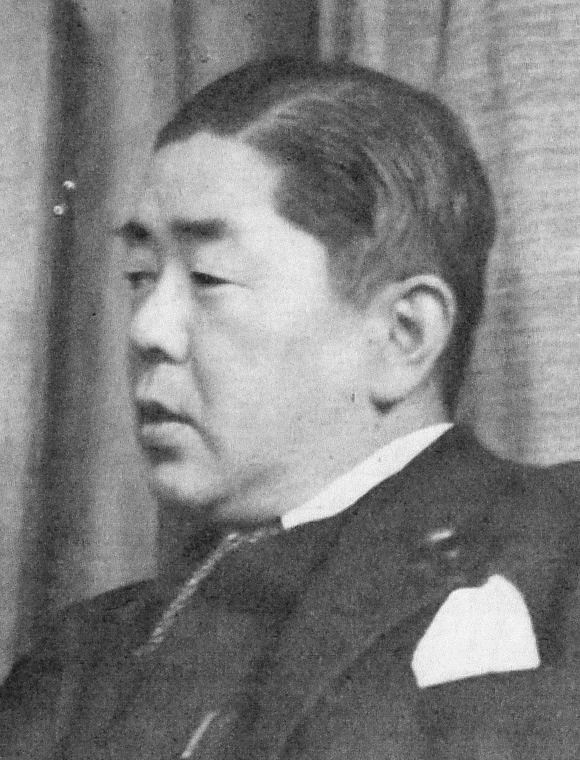
Aichi in 1954

He resigned from the Ministry of Finance in 1950, and ran as a Liberal Party candidate in the second regular election for the House of Councillors held that same year, winning his first election. His experience and policy-making skills were highly evaluated by Hayato Ikeda, who was the Minister of Finance at the time.

He was one of the "Yoshida 13" close aides to then Prime Minister Shigeru Yoshida, and was appointed Minister of International Trade and Industry and Director-General of the Economic Deliberation Agency in the Fifth Yoshida Cabinet formed in 1952.

In 1955, he ran in the general election for Miyagi 1st district and was elected, becoming a member of the House of Representatives. In the same year, he joined the Liberal Democratic Party following the merger of the Liberal Party and the Japan Democratic Party.

In 1957, he was appointed Chief Cabinet Secretary in the First Kishi Cabinet. He later became Minister of Justice and Director-General of the Autonomy Agency in the Second Kishi Cabinet. In 1964, Aichi was appointed as Minister of Education and Director-General of the Science and Technology Agency in the Third Ikeda Cabinet. Around this time, Aichi gradually began to criticize Ikeda's high economic growth policies, and instead approached Kishi, later joining the Satō faction led by Kishi's younger brother, Eisaku Satō. Within the faction, he was known as the "Five Magistrates of the Satō Faction" along with Kakuei Tanaka, Shigeru Hori, Raizo Matsuno, and Tomisaburō Hashimoto, and was the mastermind behind Satō's political campaign, coordinating the slogans of "social development" and "respect for humanity."

Following Ikeda's resignation due to illness in November 1964, Aichi continued to serve as Minister of Education and Director-General of the Science and Technology Agency in the First Satō Cabinet, and was again appointed as the Chief Cabinet Secretary after a cabinet reshuffle. He was later appointed Minister for Foreign Affairs in the Second Satō Cabinet after a reshuffle in 1968, and he retained this position in the Third Satō Cabinet. As Minister for Foreign Affairs, he visited the United States in September 1970 to attend the United Nations General Assembly in New York City. Using this as a foothold, he was in charge of negotiations between Japan and the United States for the return of Okinawa, which led to the signing of the Okinawa Reversion Agreement in 1971.

When Satō retired after a long administration, he supported Kakuei Tanaka instead of Takeo Fukuda, whom Satō had considered as his successor. Aichi then drafted policies for Tanaka's candidacy for the LDP presidential election. In July 1972, Tanaka was elected President of the LDP and became Prime Minister.

On 22 December 1972, the Second Tanaka Cabinet was formed, and Aichi was appointed Minister of Finance. Tanaka appointed Aichi, a proponent of proactive fiscal policy, during this most difficult period as the "trump card" of his administration, as he highly valued Aichi's abilities.

In February 1973, as the Smithsonian system was completely collapsing, Aichi decided to move the yen to a floating exchange rate system which led to a major shift in foreign exchange transactions. Furthermore, the 1973 oil crisis, which was caused by the Yom Kippur War, had caused extreme shortages and inflation due to an overheated economy. In the midst of all this, Aichi actively visited various countries and promoted economic diplomacy.

== Death ==
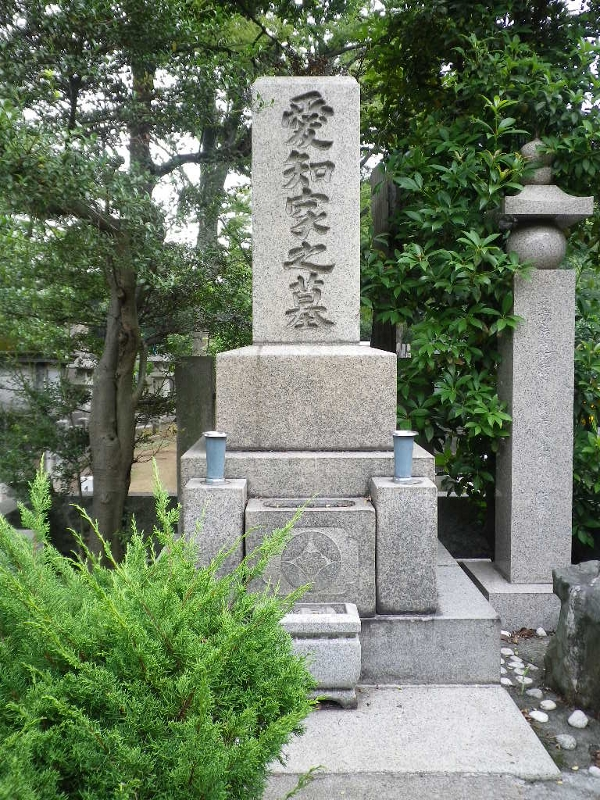
Aichi's tombstone at Zōshigaya Cemetery

In the midst of the emergency oil measures being carried out, Aichi was extremely tired from his hard work and had caught a common cold. He complained of a high fever in the middle of the night on 22 November and was taken by ambulance from his home in Bunkyō to the Keio University Hospital in Shinanomachi on the evening of the following day, but was already unconscious when he arrived at the hospital. He never regained consciousness and died at 9:50pm on the same day, shortly after being admitted.

Upon hearing the news, Kakuei Tanaka rushed to the hospital, and was left stunned and speechless in front of Aichi's body. All he could say was, "A great star has fallen, it's painful to lose Aichi-kun at this time." Tanaka, grieving the death of his trusted adviser, decided to reshuffle his cabinet and appointed Takeo Fukuda as his successor as Minister of Finance. Aichi was later buried in Zōshigaya Cemetery.

Political offices
Preceded by Kiyohide Okano	Minister of International Trade and Industry; 1954	Succeeded by Tanzan Ishibashi
Preceded by Kiyohide Okano	Director-General of the Economic Council Agency; 1954	Succeeded by Tatsunosuke Takasaki
Preceded by Hirohide Ishida	Chief Cabinet Secretary; 1957–1958	Succeeded by Munenori Akagi
Preceded by Toshiki Karasawa	Minister of Justice; 1958–1959	Succeeded by Hiroya Ino
Preceded by Masashi Aoki	Director-General of the Home Affairs Agency; 1958–1959	Succeeded by Masashi Aoki
Preceded by Hirokichi Nadao	Minister of Education; 1964–1965	Succeeded by Umekichi Nakamura
Preceded by Eisaku Satō	Director-General of the Science and Technology Agency; 1964–1965	Succeeded by Masashi Aoki
Preceded by Eisaku Satō	Chairman of the Atomic Energy Commission; 1964–1965	Succeeded by Masashi Aoki
Preceded by Tomisaburō Hashimoto	Chief Cabinet Secretary; 1966	Succeeded by Kenji Fukunaga
Preceded by Takeo Miki	Minister for Foreign Affairs; 1968–1971	Succeeded by Takeo Fukuda
Preceded by Koshiro Ueki	Minister of Finance; 1972–1973	Succeeded by Kakuei Tanaka; Interim
