= Etsusaburo Shiina =

Foreign Minister of Japan for 1964–66

Junior Second Rank Etsusaburo Shiina
- 椎名 悦三郎
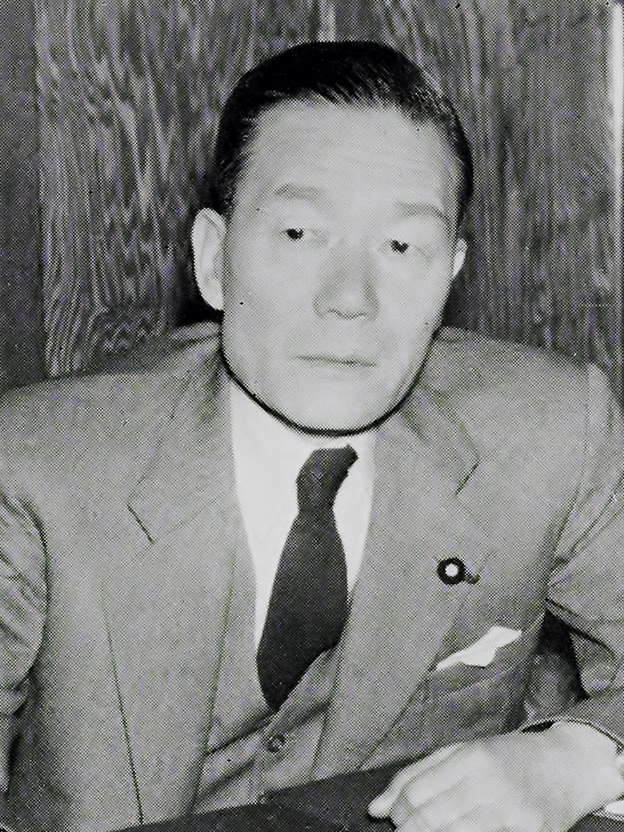
- Shiina in 1957

Vice President of the Liberal Democratic Party
- In office 22 August 1972 – 23 December 1976
- President: Kakuei Tanaka; Takeo Miki
- Secretary-General: Tomisaburo Hashimoto; Susumu Nikaidō; Yasuhiro Nakasone; Tsuneo Uchida
- Preceded by: Shojiro Kawashima
- Succeeded by: Funada Naka

Minister of International Trade and Industry
- In office 25 November 1967 – 30 November 1968
- Prime Minister: Eisaku Satō
- Preceded by: Wataro Kanno
- Succeeded by: Masayoshi Ohira
- In office 8 December 1960 – 18 July 1961
- Prime Minister: Hayato Ikeda
- Preceded by: Mitsujiro Ishii
- Succeeded by: Eisaku Satō

Minister for Foreign Affairs
- In office 18 July 1964 – 3 December 1966
- Prime Minister: Hayato Ikeda; Eisaku Satō
- Preceded by: Masayoshi Ōhira
- Succeeded by: Takeo Miki

Chief Cabinet Secretary
- In office 18 June 1959 – 19 July 1960
- Prime Minister: Nobusuke Kishi
- Preceded by: Munenori Akagi
- Succeeded by: Masayoshi Ohira

Member of the House of Representatives
- In office 28 February 1955 – 7 September 1979
- Preceded by: Yaichi Takada
- Succeeded by: Motoo Shiina
- Constituency: Iwate 2nd

Personal details
- Born: 16 January 1898 Mizusawa, Iwate, Japan
- Died: 30 September 1979 (aged 81) Shinjuku, Tokyo, Japan
- Party: Liberal Democratic (1955–1979)
- Other political affiliations: Democratic (1954–1955)
- Children: Motoo Shiina
- Relatives: Gotō Shinpei (uncle)
- Education: Tokyo Imperial University

Etsusaburo Shiina (椎名 悦三郎, Shiina Etsusaburō; 16 January 1898 – 30 September 1979) was a career bureaucrat and politician. As Foreign Minister of Japan from 1964 to 1966 he played a pivotal role in diplomatic relations between Japan and South Korea.

== Early life and education ==
Shiina was born in Mizusawa, Iwate (now part of Oshu, Iwate) to Hiroshi Gotō, a member of the Iwate Prefectural Assembly and former elementary school teacher. His father later served as mayor of Mizusawa for ten years. The Gotō family claimed descent from the famed rangaku scholar Takano Chōei, whose childhood name was "Saburō Etsu", and thus Shiina was named "Etsusaburō" in his honor. However, his father went bankrupt due to business issues and Shiina was forced to work during the day and attempted to study at night. He departed for Tokyo during his fourth year of high school and suffered from various difficulties until the family's fortune changed due to royalties received on hydroelectric development projects in the Isawa River and due to a connection via marriage with Tokyo governor Gotō Shimpei. Shiina was thus able to enter the Law School of Tokyo Imperial University and he also changed his name from Gotō to Shiina.

== Bureaucratic career ==
After graduating from Tokyo Imperial University in March 1923, Shiina entered the Ministry of Agriculture and Commerce, where he was assigned to the Engineering Bureau. After the Ministry of Agriculture and Commerce separated into the Ministry of Agriculture and Forestry and the Ministry of Commerce and Industry in the following year, he joined that latter. In 1925 he was one of the government officials who were dispatched nationwide to instruct and supervise important export goods and to promote the formation of cartels. As a section manager, he worked for the Aichi Prefectural Office in Nagoya for the next four years. During this time, he visited Manchuria and negotiated with the South Manchurian Railway to operate regularly scheduled shipping connecting Nagoya Port and Dalian. In 1929, he returned to the Industrial Affairs Division of the Ministry of Commerce and Industry. He was sent to Europe in August 1932 to observe the measures and industrial policies of the European countries during the Great Depression and returned home in May 1933.

=== Career in Manchukuo ===
At the request of Nobusuke Kishi, Shiina was one of the first officials of the Japanese Ministry of Commerce and Industry to join the new Manchukuo administration. He arrived in Shinkyo in October 1933 as Director of the Planning and Coordination Bureau of the Manchukuo Ministry of Industry. Shiina led an industrial survey of Manchukuo for three years. The survey was also conducted in remote areas of the country where marauders were still a problem, and covering agriculture, forestry, underground resources, and hydroelectric power sources. Based on this survey, the number of farmers from Japan who could emigrate to Manchukuo was determined, and the construction of hydroelectric power plants on the Songhua River and Yalu River was planned. The results of this survey were also used for a five-year industrial development plan. In addition, Shiina established the Critical Industry Control Law which aimed for a state-controlled economy centered on a national monopoly system for each industry. In July 1937, Shiina assumed the position of Director of Mining and Industry. However, in 1939, Shiina asked to resign his posts and to return to Japan. Kishi, together with Yoshisuke Aikawa, offered him an executive role in the Manchurian Industrial Development Company, but Shiina refused and returned to Japan in April 1939.

=== Wartime career ===
After returning to Japan in April 1939, Shiina joined the Temporary Material Coordination Bureau of the Ministry of Commerce and Industry, where he was charge of controlling and procuring supplies according to national policy based on the National Mobilization Law. He was the director of the department responsible for chemical products. The Ministry of Commerce and Industry set up a mining department, a steel department, a chemical department, a machinery department, a textile department and a fuel department in accordance with the wartime requirements. In June of the same year, Shiina was promoted to division chief in the General Affairs Bureau, which managed all of these departments. In October of the same year, Kishi returned to the Ministry of Commerce and Industry as vice minister and with the support of the Japanese military, Shiina was promoted to chief of the General Affairs Bureau.

In July 1940, the Second Konoe Cabinet was established. Ichizō Kobayashi, Minister of Commerce and Industry, strongly opposed the draft plan of the new economic system, which created a conflict with Kishi. Kishi was removed as vice minister at the end of the year. Arakazu Ojima, who was recommended by Shiina, was appointed as the Vice Minister of Commerce and Industry, and succeeded Kishi. In October 1941, when the Tōjō Cabinet was established, Kishi returned as Minister of Commerce and Industry with Shiina as the vice minister under Kishi.

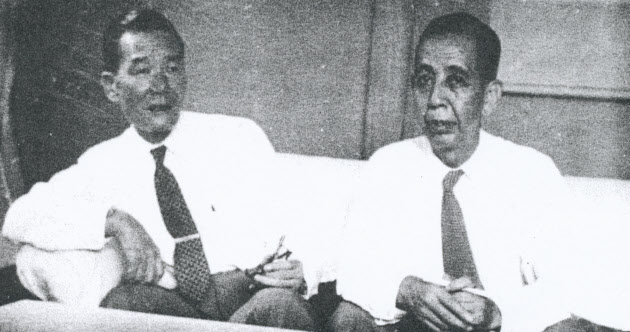
Shiina with Nobusuke Kishi in 1942

With the start of the Pacific War, Kishi and Shiina promoted a strict war-controlled economic policy in cooperation with the military, which included conversions of textile factories to weapon factories, and the forced consolidation of many small and medium-sized enterprises for munitions production. When the Ministry of Munitions was founded in November 1943, Hideki Tōjō concurrently served as Minister, with Kishi as vice minister and Shiina as the Director General of Mobilization. In July 1944, the Tōjō Cabinet was forced to resign; however, Shiina remained in his post. In April 1945, with the launch of the Kantarō Suzuki Cabinet, Shiina was promoted to vice minister of Munitions. On 26 August, the same year, after the surrender of Japan, the Ministry of Munitions was abolished and the Ministry of Commerce and Industry was revived. Shiina was again made vice minister of Commerce and Industry to construct a new organization for the post-war economic reconstruction. He retired from position on 12 October of the same year with the resignation of the Higashikuni Cabinet. Shiina was interrogated eight times by the American occupation authorities, but was not arrested. He was however, purged from public office in November 1947.

== Corporate career ==
Shiina was appointed as president of Tohoku Shinko Textile Industry Co., Ltd., headquartered in Morioka in November 1947. The company changed its name to Tohoku Woven Co., Ltd. in March of the following year. Shiina acquired Daito Boshoku's Kanamachi factory in Tokyo and purchased new equipment. However he was unable to secure loans from the Reconstruction Finance Bank due to implementation of an inflation control policies in 1949. Although he struggled to obtain funds from other sources, due to the company's low technical level, it could not meet up with the special demands created due to the Korean War, and in May 1952 declared bankruptcy. Shiina resigned as president in July of the same year, and Tohoku Woven was later absorbed by Kureha Spinning. Immediately after resigning, Shiina had a breakdown and was hospitalized.

== Political career ==
In 1951 Shiina ran for a seat in the lower house during the 1952 Japanese general election; however, he was unable to obtain assistance from Kishi who had suffered a big loss the previous year. He turned to Kishi's younger brother, Eisaku Satō, for official recognition from the Liberal Party, but Satō refused, and introduced him to the party's election measures chief Saeki Ozawa, the father of Ichirō Ozawa, who also refused to certify Shiina. Despite these setbacks, Shiina ran anyway, but the results were disastrous, and he was later investigated by the police on suspicion of election violations.

At the invitation of Kishi, who had become secretary general of the Democratic Party, Shiina was nominated 1955 Japanese general election as an official candidate of the Japanese Democratic Party. This time, with the full support of Kishi, and with abundant election funds, he managed to secure a seat. Within the Second Ichirō Hatoyama Cabinet, Shiina became the Vice Chairman of the party's policy research council, and was a member of the Transportation Committee. In November of the same year, the Democratic Party and the Liberal Party joined to form the Liberal Democratic Party (LDP).

In February 1957, the Kishi became Prime Minister and Shiina is appointed as the party treasury bureau chief, even though he had only won one election. Under Shiina, political contributions from the business world to the LDP expanded fivefold. In 1958 Japanese general election, Shiina was reelected. He was appointed as Chief Cabinet Secretary in the Second Kishi Cabinet despite the fact that he had only won election twice. Kishi defended his choice of Shiina stating that he was essential to negotiating the Treaty of Mutual Cooperation and Security Between the United States and Japan.

Shiina won reelection for a third time in the 1960 Japanese general election, and was appointed Minister of International Trade and Industry in the Second Ikeda Cabinet. However, he was immediately accused by opposition political parties of massive election violations, both in 1958 and in 1960. His general manager and accountant, Masazo Matsukawa, was placed on the police "most wanted list", and it was later revealed that the haven where he had been hidden is a company-owned house of one of Shiina's business acquaintances, with Shiina's secretaries providing him with financial assistance. Shiina resigned in June 1961, and afterwards Matsukawa finally surrendered to the authorities and was convicted in March 1962. Despite these issues, Shiina was re-elected once again in the 1963 Japanese general election.

In the Third Ikeda Cabinet, he was appointed as Minister for Foreign Affairs. He remained in this post under the First Satō Cabinet. During this time, he negotiated the Japan-Korea Basic Treaty which normalized diplomatic relations between Japan and South Korea. He visited South Korea in person in February 1965 and made a public apology; "In our two countries' long history, there have been unfortunate times... it is truly regretable and we are deeply remorseful," during the signing of the Treaty on Basic Relations between Japan and the Republic of Korea on 22 June 1965. An agreement was reached on reparations for Japanese colonial rule over Korea, on the legal status of the Zainichi Koreans in Japan and on fisheries, with decisions on more difficult issues, such as the sovereignty issue over the Liancourt Rocks shelved until a later date. The agreement was severely criticized by opposition parties, newspapers and students in both countries, and Shiina survived votes of no confidence by the Japan Communist Party and Japan Socialist Party on his return. In 1966, he visited the Soviet Union as the first Japanese foreign minister to visit after World War II and negotiated a five-year trade agreement and a civil aviation agreement as well.

In December 1966, Shiina was made LDP general council chairman. After serving for less than a year, he was appointed Minister of International Trade and Industry again under the Second Satō Cabinet in November 1967. In July 1972 the post of Satō's successor was contested between Kakuei Tanaka and Takeo Fukuda. Shiina led a faction in favor of Tanaka, and Tanaka became Prime Minister. In August 1973, Shiina was rewarded by becoming Vice President of the LDP.

When Tanaka decided to normalize diplomatic relations between Japan and the People's Republic of China, Shiina was sent as a special envoy to visit Taiwan to explain the situation to President Chiang Kai-shek. Shiina officially expressed the idea that Japan would continue to maintain diplomatic relations with Taiwan. However, this was different from the LDP's policy, and after Shiina returned from Taiwan, Prime Minister Tanaka and Foreign Minister Masayoshi Ōhira met with Chinese Premier Zhou Enlai in Beijing, and it was agreed that Japan would sever relations with Taiwan. In 1974, the relationship between Japan and South Korea deteriorated over the kidnapping of Kim Dae-jung from Japan, and in September, Tanaka requested Shiina to meet with South Korean President Park Chung Hee to calm the issue.

Following LDP losses in the 1974 Japanese House of Councillors election and acrimony between Vice Prime Minister Takeo Miki and Finance Minister Takeo Fukuda, Tanaka asked that Shiina head a committee to reform the party and also asked Tanaka to determine his successor through discussions without an open election. In December 1974, Shiina issued a ruling to the major factions of the party that Takeo Miki should succeed Tanaka. This was a decision that was largely welcomed by the public due to Miki's "clean" image. Shiina continued to serve as Vice President of the LDP under Miki, but soon had falling out over differences in policy over political contributions and the idea of a single-member constituency system. In May 1976, Shiina used the Lockheed Scandal as cover to seek the resignations of Tanaka, Fukuda, Ohira and Miki from politics. Miki refused, and failure of his attempted coup drastically reduced Shiina's political influence. With the inauguration of the Takeo Fukuda Cabinet, Shiina announced his retirement.

== Death ==
On 30 September 1979, Shiina was hospitalized at Keio University Hospital and died at the age of 81. He was buried in the Shunjuen Cemetery in Kawasaki, Kanagawa.

== Honours ==
- Order of the Sacred Treasure, 3rd class (9 June 1943)
- Grand Cordon of the Order of the Rising Sun (29 April 1969)
- Grand Cordon of the Order of the Rising Sun with Paulownia Flowers (30 September 1979; posthumous)
- Junior Second Rank (30 September 1979)

=== Foreign honour ===
- West Germany: Grand Crosses 1st class of the Order of Merit of the Federal Republic of Germany (1960)
- Spain: Knights Grand Cross of the Order of Isabella the Catholic (2 April 1965) (Note: Awarded by the Caudillo of Spain on 23 February 1965.)
- Bolivia: Grand Cross of the Order of the Condor of the Andes (1 April 1966)
- Argentina: Grand Cross of the Order of the Liberator General San Martín (9 September 1966)

== Notes ==
Party political offices
| Preceded by Naka Funada | Chairman of the Policy Research Council, Liberal Democratic Party; 1960 | Succeeded by Takeo Fukuda |
| Preceded by Kenji Fukunaga | Chairman of the General Council, Liberal Democratic Party; 1966-1967 | Succeeded by Tomisaburo Hashimoto |
| Preceded by Shojiro Kawashima | Vice President of the Liberal Democratic Party; 1972-1976 | Succeeded by Naka Funada |
Political offices
| Preceded by Munenori Akagi | Chief Cabinet Secretary; 1959–1960 | Succeeded by Masayoshi Ōhira |
| Preceded by Mitsujirō Ishii | Minister of International Trade and Industry; 1960–1961 | Succeeded by Eisaku Satō |
| Preceded by Masayoshi Ōhira | Minister for Foreign Affairs; 1964–1966 | Succeeded by Takeo Miki |
| Preceded by Watarō Kanno | Minister of International Trade and Industry; 1967–1968 | Succeeded by Masayoshi Ōhira |
