= Kenji Fukunaga =

Japanese politician

- 福永 健司
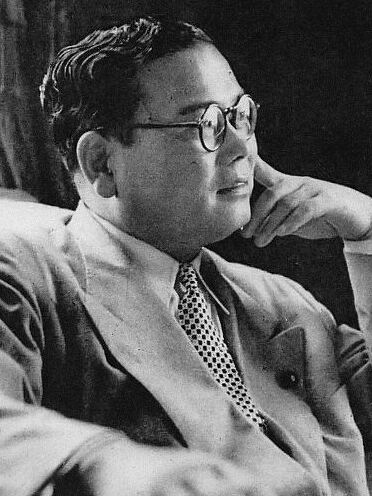
- Fukunaga in 1952

Speaker of the House of Representatives
- In office 26 December 1983 – 24 January 1985
- Monarch: Hirohito
- Deputy: Seiichi Katsumata
- Preceded by: Hajime Fukuda
- Succeeded by: Michita Sakata
Ministerial offices
Minister of Transport
In office 28 November 1977 – 7 December 1978
Prime Minister	Takeo Fukuda
Preceded by	Hajime Tamura
Succeeded by	Kinji Moriyama
Minister of Health and Welfare
In office 11 November 1974 – 9 December 1974
Prime Minister	Kakuei Tanaka
Preceded by	Kunikichi Saito
Succeeded by	Masami Tanaka
Chief Cabinet Secretary
In office 3 December 1966 – 22 June 1967
Prime Minister	Eisaku Satō
Preceded by	Kiichi Aichi
Succeeded by	Toshio Kimura
In office 24 March 1953 – 10 December 1954
Prime Minister	Shigeru Yoshida
Preceded by	Taketora Ogata
Succeeded by	Ryūtaro Nemoto
Minister of Labour
In office 18 July 1961 – 18 July 1962
Prime Minister	Hayato Ikeda
Preceded by	Hirohide Ishida
Succeeded by	Takeo Ōhashi

Member of the House of Representatives
- In office 24 January 1949 – 31 May 1988
- Preceded by: Tajima Fusakuni
- Succeeded by: Nobuhiko Fukunaga
- Constituency: Saitama 1st (1949–1976); Saitama 5th (1976–1988)

Personal details
- Born: 5 August 1910 Koka, Shiga, Japan
- Died: 31 May 1988 (aged 77) Ōmiya, Saitama, Japan
- Party: Liberal Democratic
- Other political affiliations: DLP (1948–1950); LP (1950–1955)
- Education: Tokyo Imperial University

Kenji Fukunaga (福永 健司, Fukunaga Kenji; 5 August 1910 – 31 May 1988) was a Japanese politician who was Chief Cabinet Secretary on four occasions, and, as well as serving in various other cabinet positions, was also appointed as Speaker of the House of Representatives of Japan. He was also seen as an influential voice within the Liberal Democratic Party.

== Early life ==
Fukunaga was born on 5 August 1910, in Koka, Shiga. He graduated from Tokyo Imperial University in 1933.

== Career ==
After initially working in textiles, and rising to a management position, Fukunaga entered the world of politics and became deputy governor of Saitama Prefecture in 1947. In 1949, Fukunaga stood for election and became the representative from Saitama 5th (a seat he retained 15 times).

In his early years in politics, Fukunaga received extensive political tutoring from Shigeru Yoshida, and became a protégé of his, serving in his cabinet twice as Chief Cabinet Secretary. He then reprised that role in the cabinet of Eisaku Satō, serving as Chief Cabinet Secretary twice more, while he briefly served as Minister of Labour in the interim period under Hayato Ikeda. It was under Satō that Fukunaga came into his own, serving as Chair of the LDP General Council in the late 1960s, and playing a key role as a special ambassador in the Japanese government's response to the Lod Airport massacre.

In the 1970s, Fukunaga also served in the Tanaka and Fukuda cabinets, and a few years before his death was appointed Speaker of the House of Representatives of Japan, a post he retained until 1985. He remained a key figure within the party until his death. Fukunaga died on 31 May 1988.

== Honours ==
- Grand Cordon of the Order of the Rising Sun with Pauwlonia Flowers (1986)

House of Representatives (Japan)
Preceded by Hajime Fukuda	Speaker of the House of Representatives of Japan; 1983–1985	Succeeded by Michita Sakata
Political offices
Preceded by Taketora Ogata	Chief Cabinet Secretary; 1953–1954	Succeeded by Ryūtaro Nemoto
Preceded by Hirohide Ishida	Minister of Labour; 1961–1962	Succeeded by Takeo Ōhashi
Preceded by Kiichi Aichi	Chief Cabinet Secretary; 1966–1967	Succeeded by Toshio Kimura
Preceded by Kunikichi Saito	Minister of Health and Welfare; 1974	Succeeded by Masami Tanaka
Preceded by Hajime Tamura	Minister of Transport; 1977–1978	Succeeded by Kinji Moriyama
Party political offices
Preceded by Shigesaburo Maeo	Chair, General Council of the Liberal Democratic Party; 1966	Succeeded by Etsusaburo Shiina
