= Ministry of Posts and Telecommunications (Japan) =

Japanese government ministry

- 郵政省; Yūsei-shō
- The Japanese postal mark, which served as the ministry's logo

Agency overview
- Formed: April 1, 1949
- Preceding agencies: Ministry of Communications; Ministry of Posts; Ministry of Telecommunications
- Dissolved: January 5, 2001
- Superseding agency: Ministry of Internal Affairs and Communications
- Jurisdiction: Japan
- Headquarters: Chiyoda-ku, Tokyo, Japan
- Parent agency: Government of Japan
- Website: Ministry of Posts and Telecommunications at the Wayback Machine (archive index)

The Ministry of Posts and Telecommunications (郵政省, Yūsei-shō) was one of the ministries in the Japanese government. It was formed on 1 August 1952 by the merger of the Ministry of Postal Services (郵政省) and the Ministry of Telecommunications (電気通信省), which themselves superseded the Ministry of Communications (逓信省, Teishin-shō) from 1 April 1946.

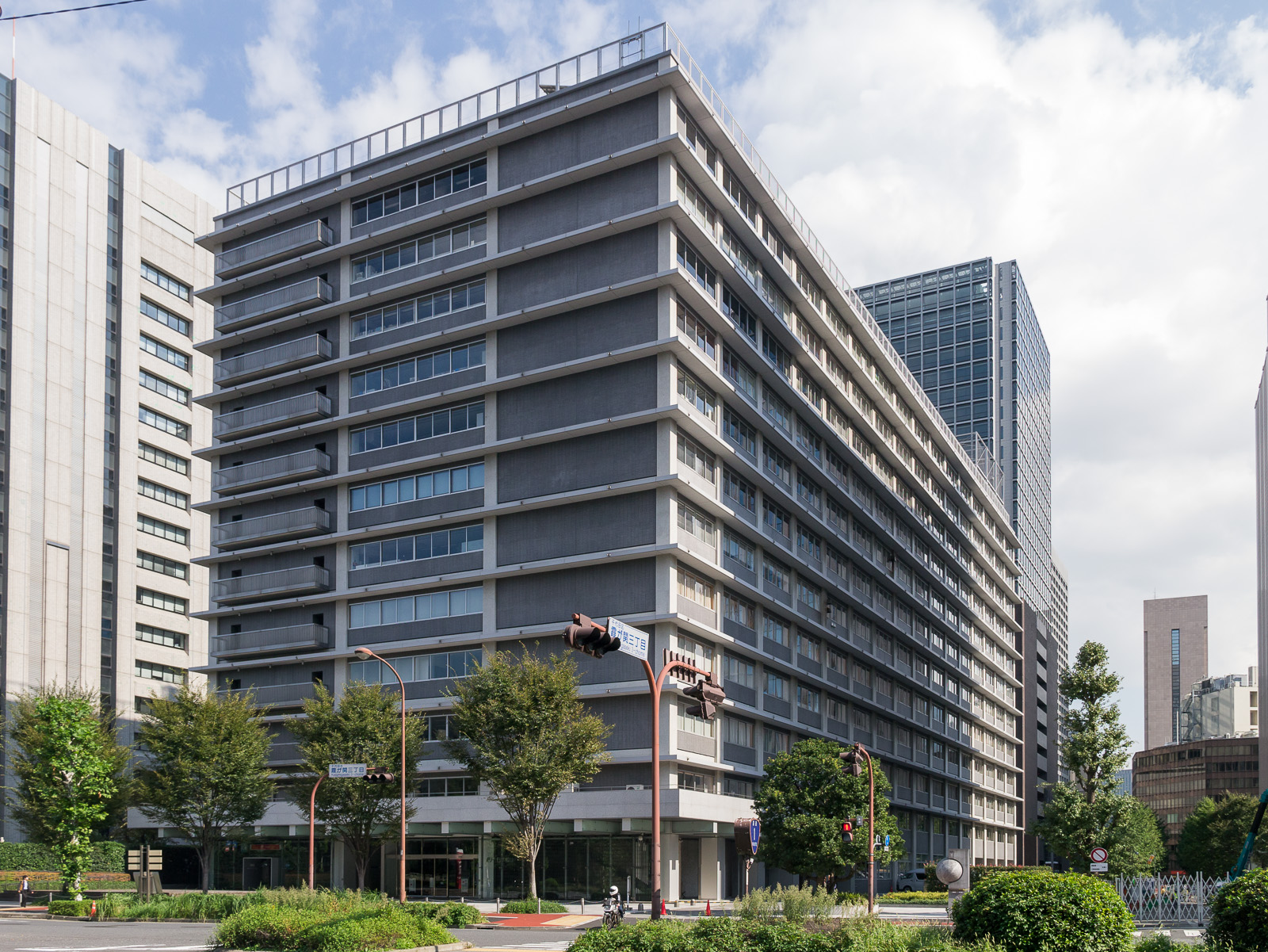
Head Office, Chiyoda, Tokyo

The ministry introduced the POSIVA system for giving aid to foreign countries in January 1991.

In January 2001, the ministry was merged with other ministries to form the Ministry of Internal Affairs and Communications. The Postal Services Agency, under the new ministry, continued the POSIVA program.
