= Naikaku Sōri Daijin Kantei =

Official workplace of the Prime Minister of Japan

- 内閣総理大臣官邸

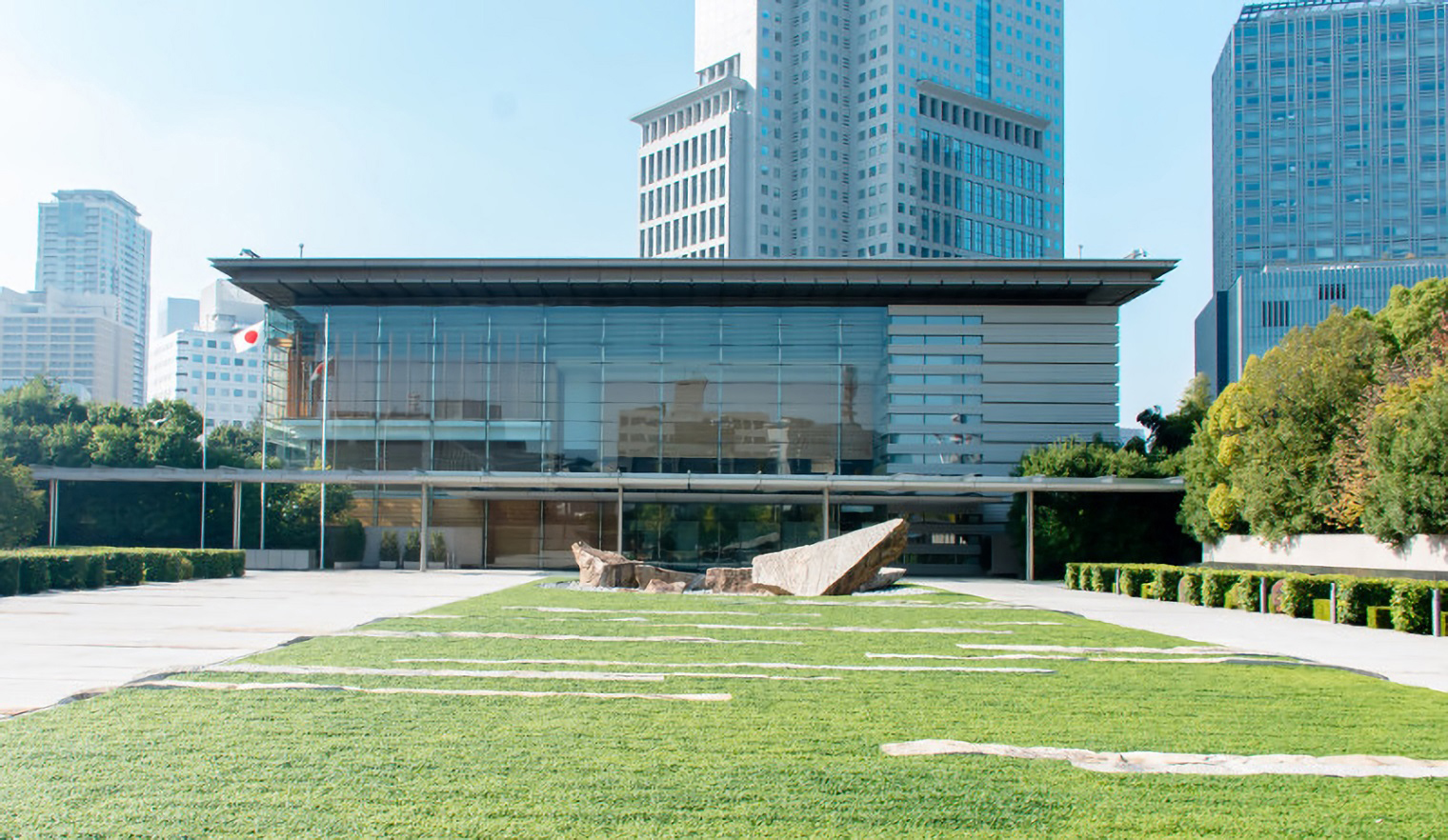
- The east façade of the new Office Building

- Location within Japan Location within Kanto Area Location within Tokyo Location within Special wards of Tokyo

General information
- Location: 2-3-1 Nagatachō; Chiyoda-ku; 100-8968, Tokyo, Japan
- Coordinates: 35°40′23″N 139°44′35″E
- Current tenants: Prime Minister of Japan, Cabinet Secretariat
- Construction started: May 22, 1999; 27 years ago
- Completed: April 22, 2002; 24 years ago

Height
- Height: 35 metres (115 ft)

Technical details
- Floor count: 5 floors above ground, 1 basement
- Floor area: 25,000 m^{2} (270,000 sq ft)
- Grounds: 46,000 m^{2} (500,000 sq ft)

Design and construction
- Architects: Ministry of Land, Infrastructure, Transport and Tourism, Minister's Secretariat

Website
- kantei.go.jp

The Naikaku Sōri Daijin Kantei (内閣総理大臣官邸) or Prime Minister's Office is the official workplace of the prime minister of Japan. It is commonly referred to as Shushō Kantei (首相官邸), or simply Kantei (官邸). Naikaku Sōri Daijin Kantei literally translates to "Prime Minister's Office" in English.

Located at Nagata-chō, Chiyoda-ku, Tokyo, it is diagonally adjacent to the National Diet Building. The term Kantei is used as a metonym for the office of the prime minister of Japan and for the prime minister's advisors and administration in general.

In addition to being the principal office of the prime minister, the building also serves as the principal office of the chief cabinet secretary and their deputy, the location of Cabinet meetings, and is also the location of a national crisis management center.

== Usage ==
The first floor contains a press conference room where the prime minister and the chief cabinet secretary hold press conferences. On the fourth floor there is a room where the Cabinet holds meetings, summits, etc. The fifth floor has the Prime Minister's Office, his or her Reception Room, the chief cabinet secretary's office and reception room.

== History ==
=== Current office ===
A new five-storied office building was built in 2002, with 2.5 times the floor space. Installed with solar panels and a rainwater storage system, the new building has been designed to minimize environmental impact. The new residence went into service in April 2002

In an April 2015 incident, a Phantom 2 drone carrying traces of radiation was found on the roof of the PM's office.

In October 2024, a vehicle used by Atsunobu Usuda crashed into a police barricade near the PMO.

New Kantei
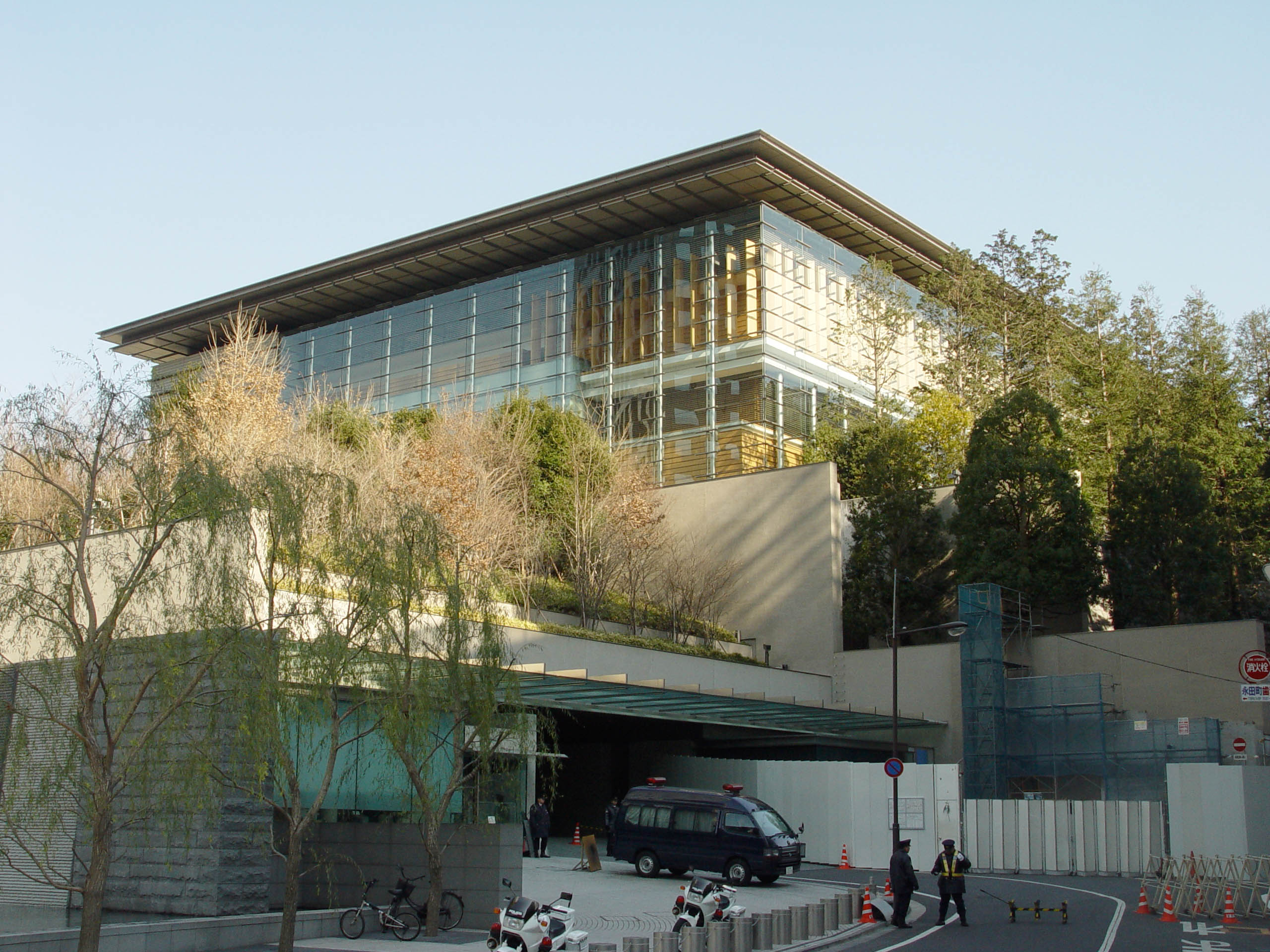
The west façade of the Kantei (valley side)

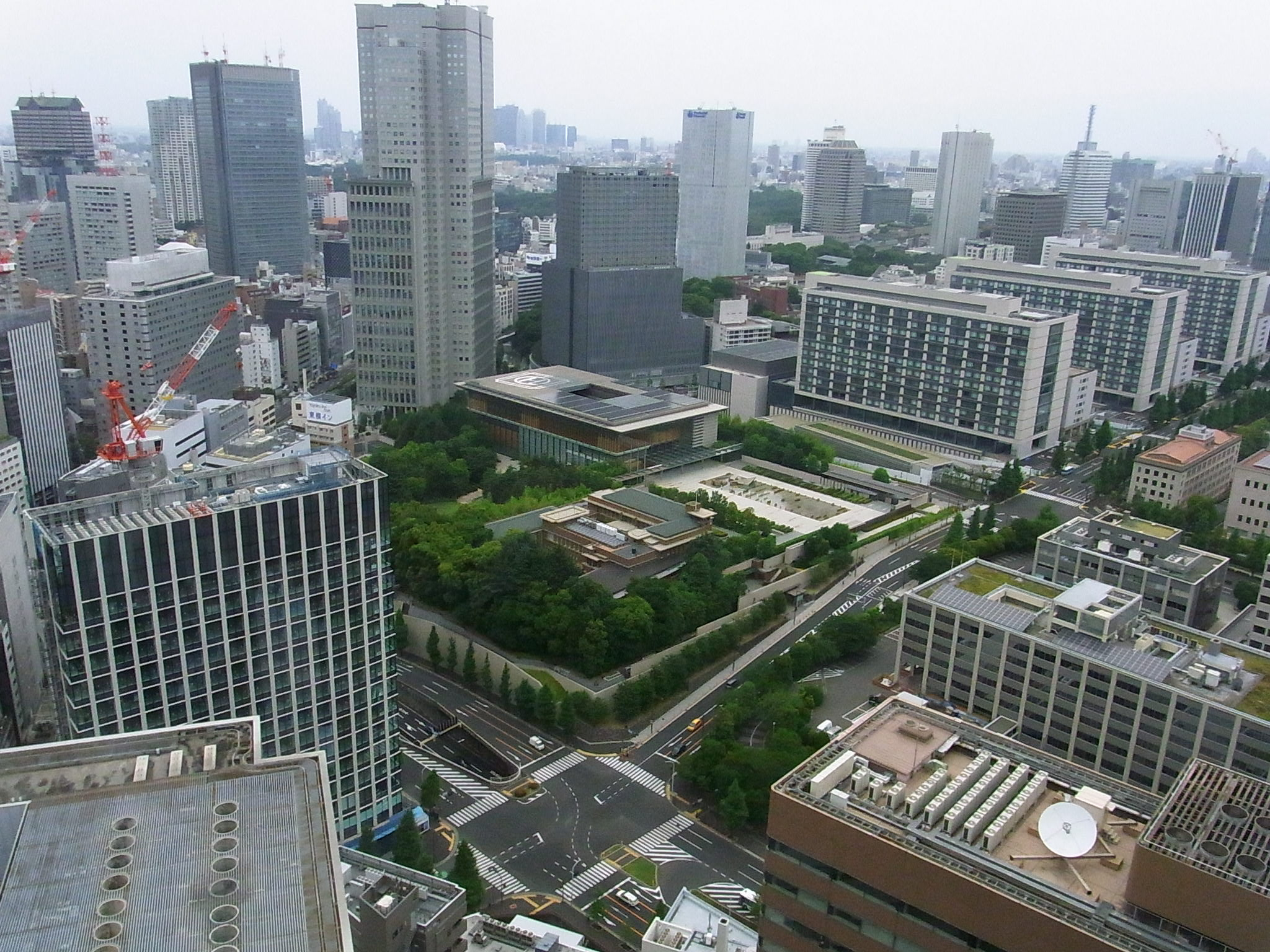
Kantei viewed from the Kasumigaseki Building in 2010

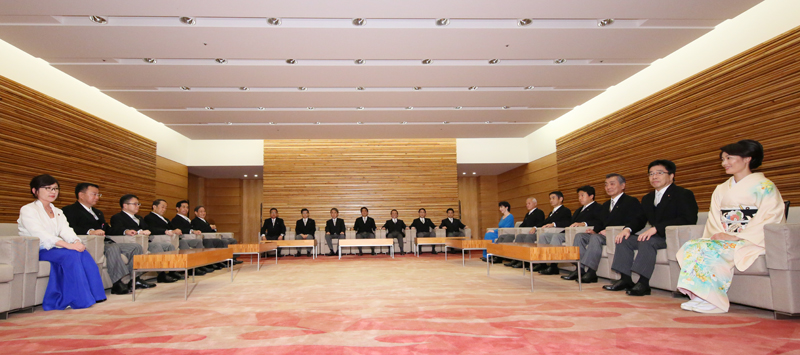
Ministerial reception room

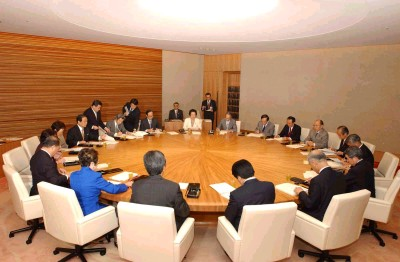
Cabinet room

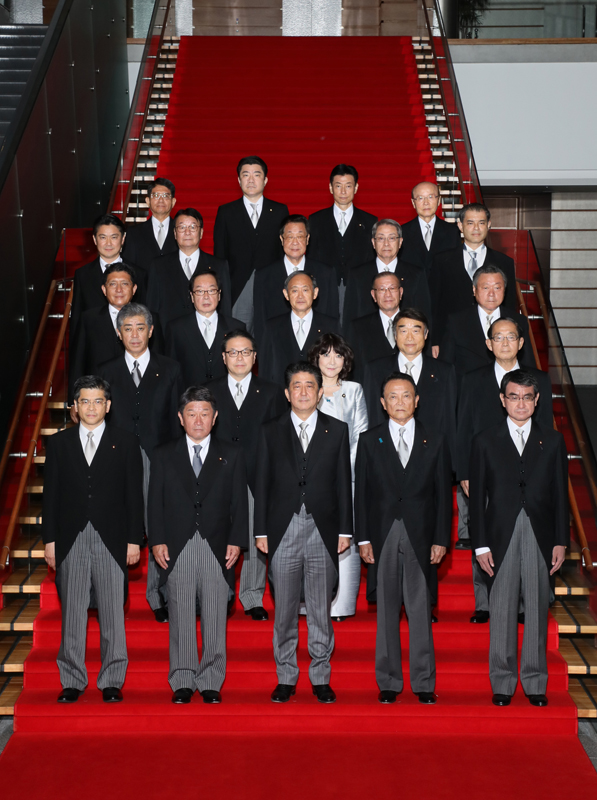
Stairs between the second and third floors. Commemorative photo after the cabinet formation

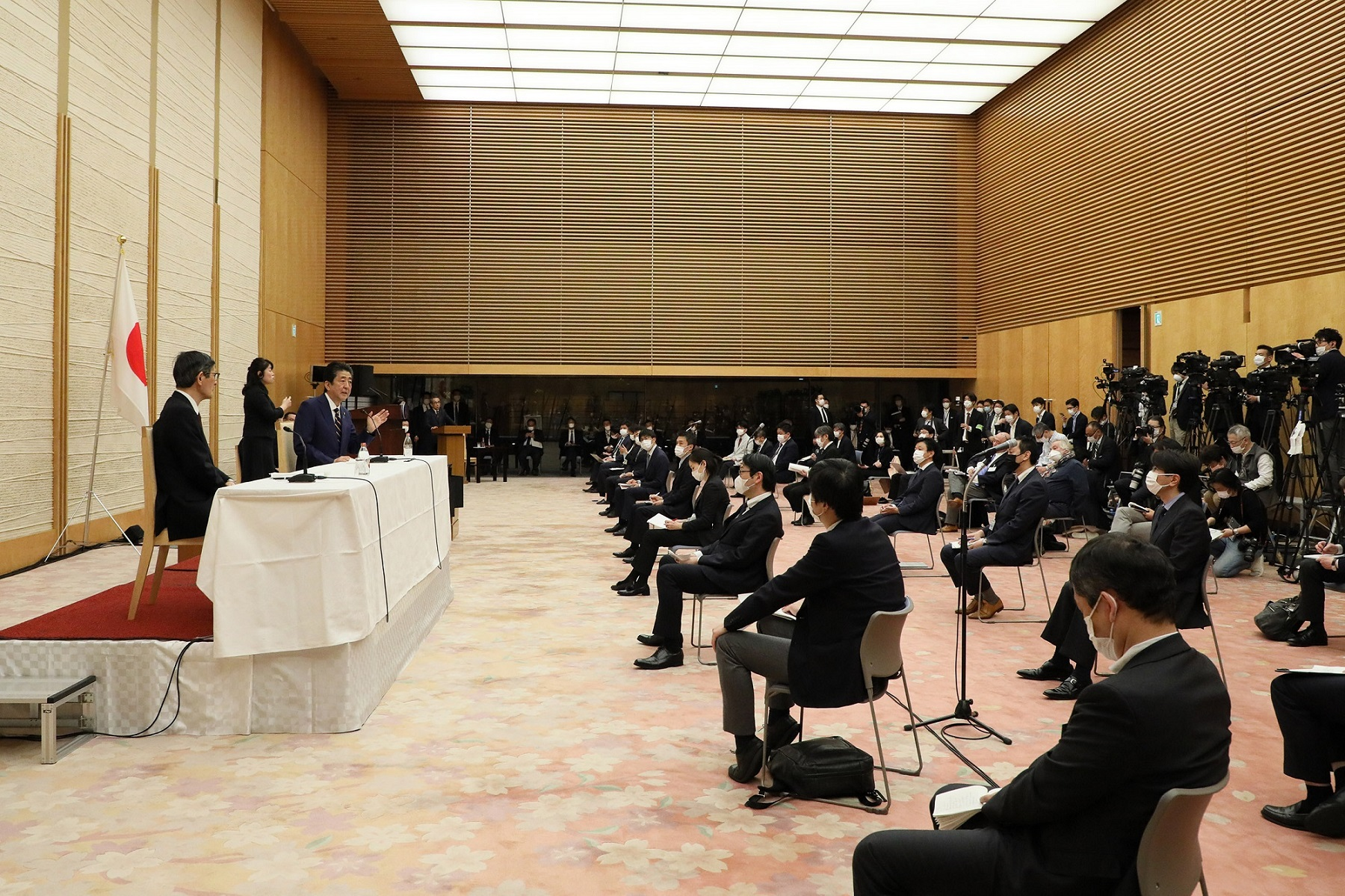
Hall

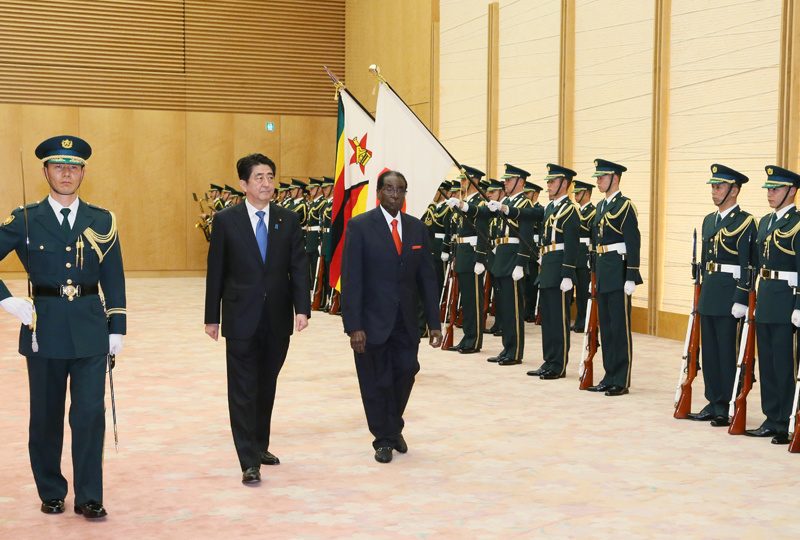
Honor guard in the hall

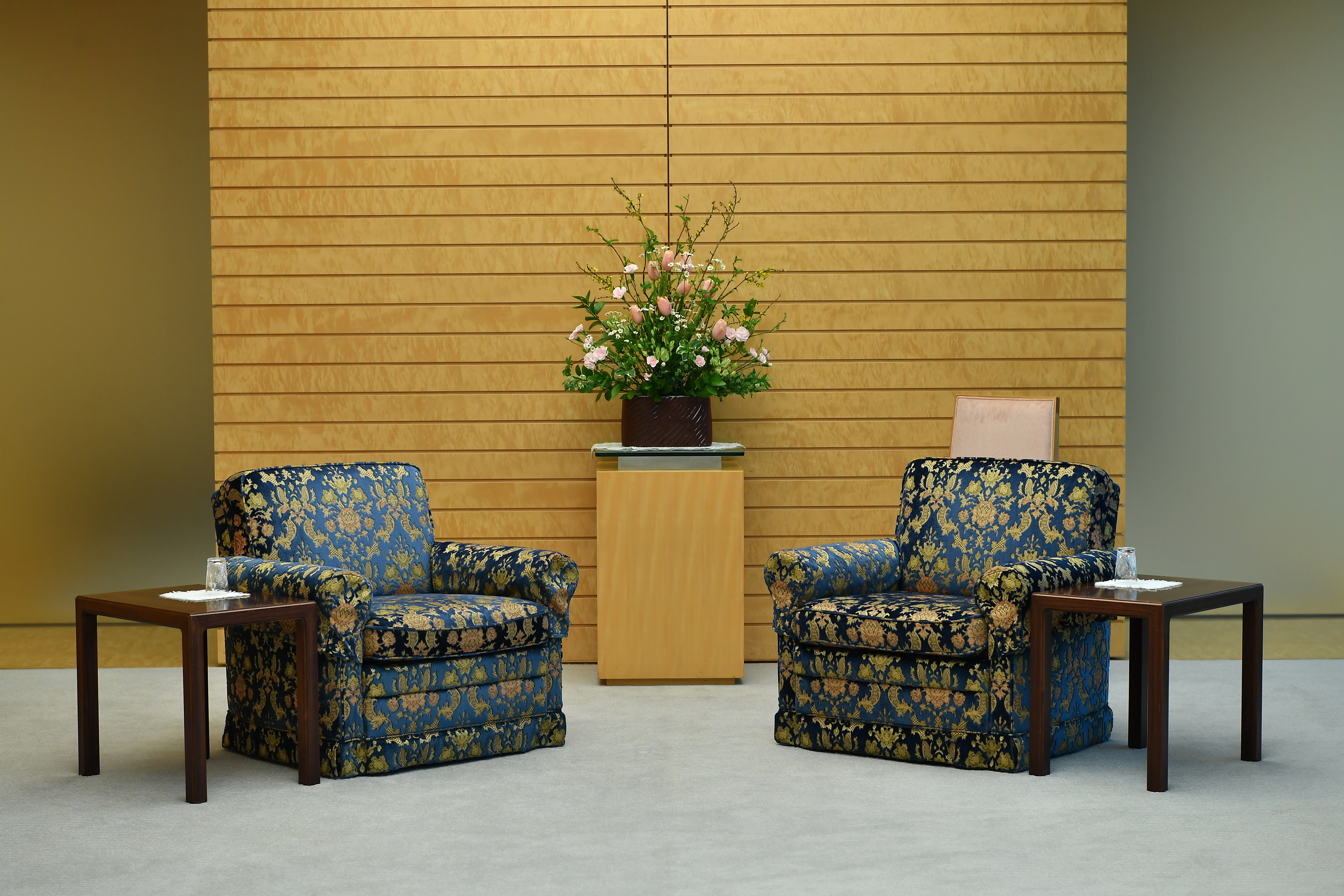
Special Reception Room

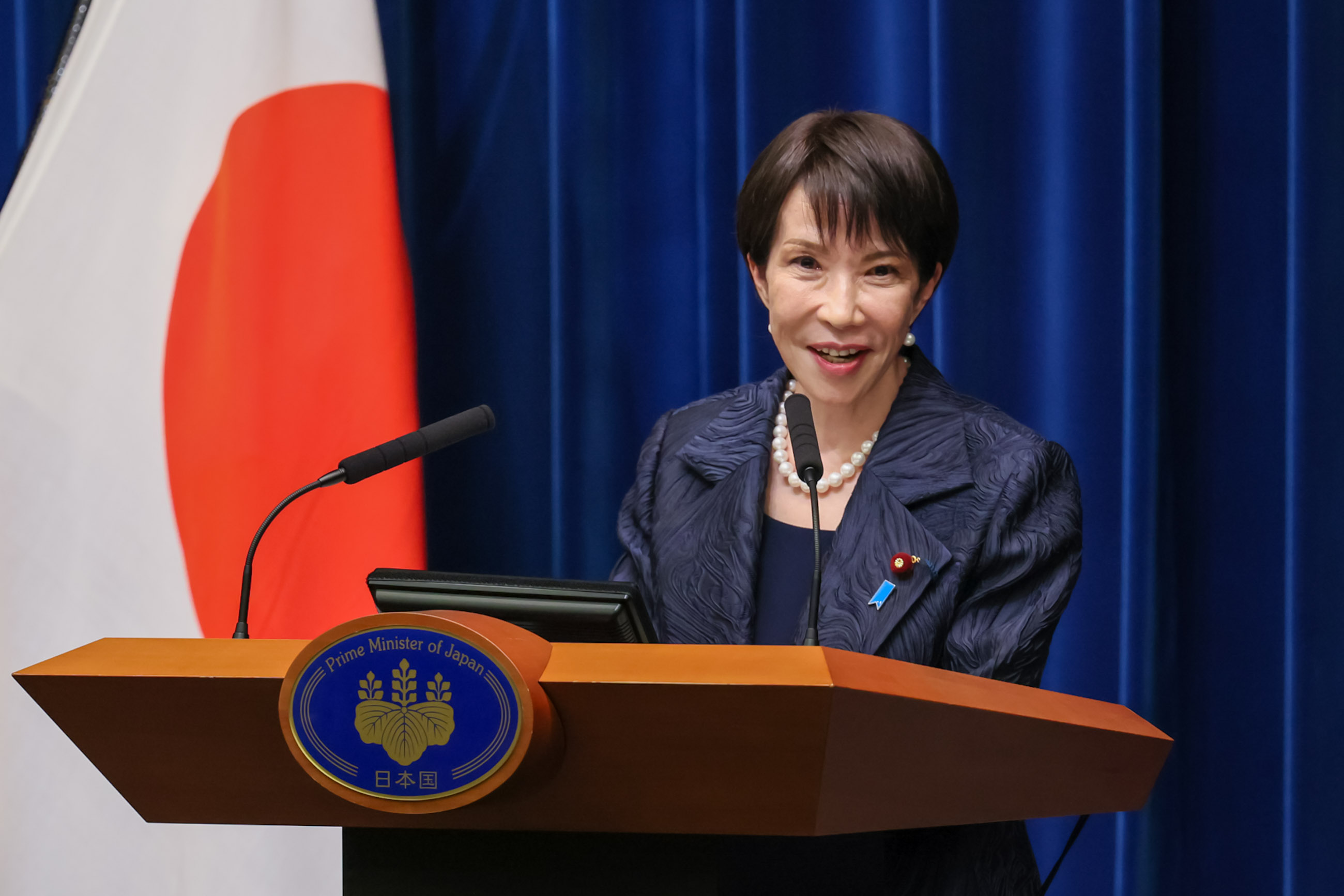
Meeting with the prime minister in the press conference room. Behind it is the blue curtain used by the prime minister

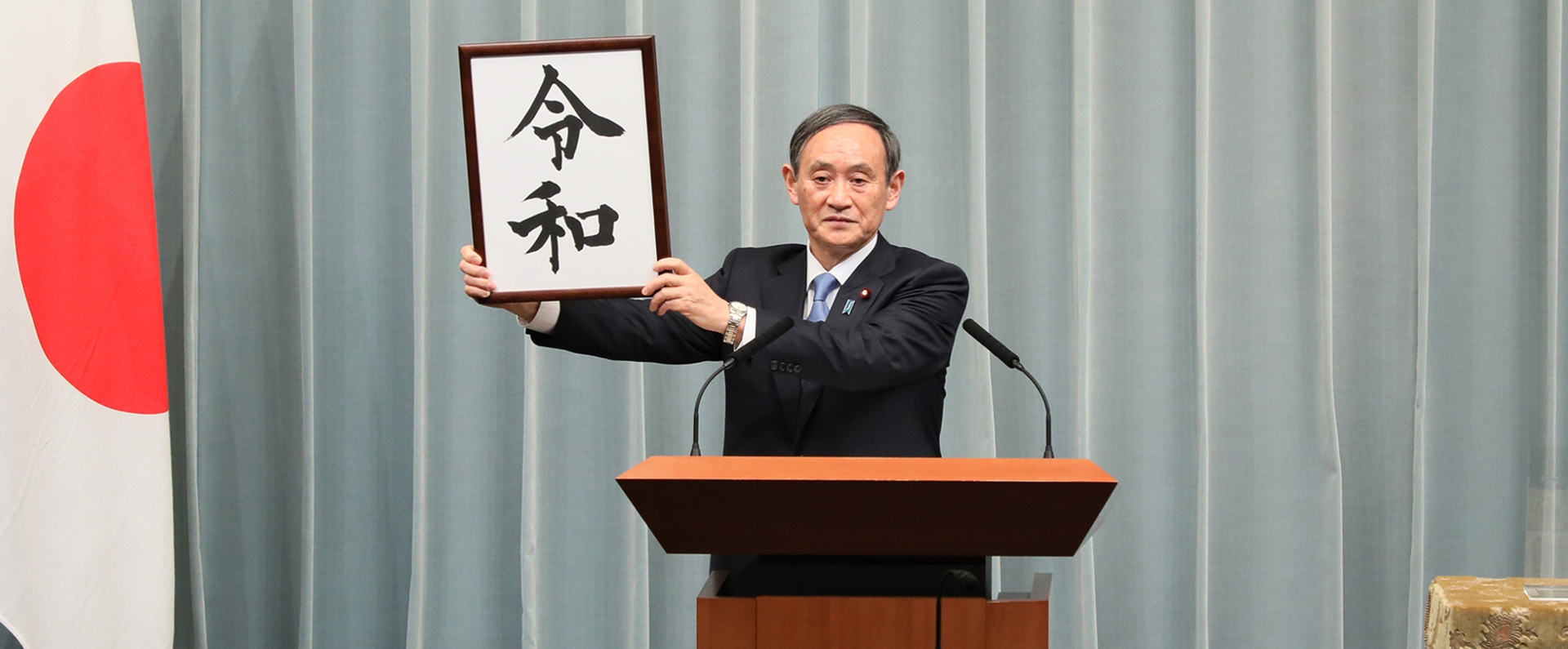
Green curtain for meeting with the chief cabinet secretary

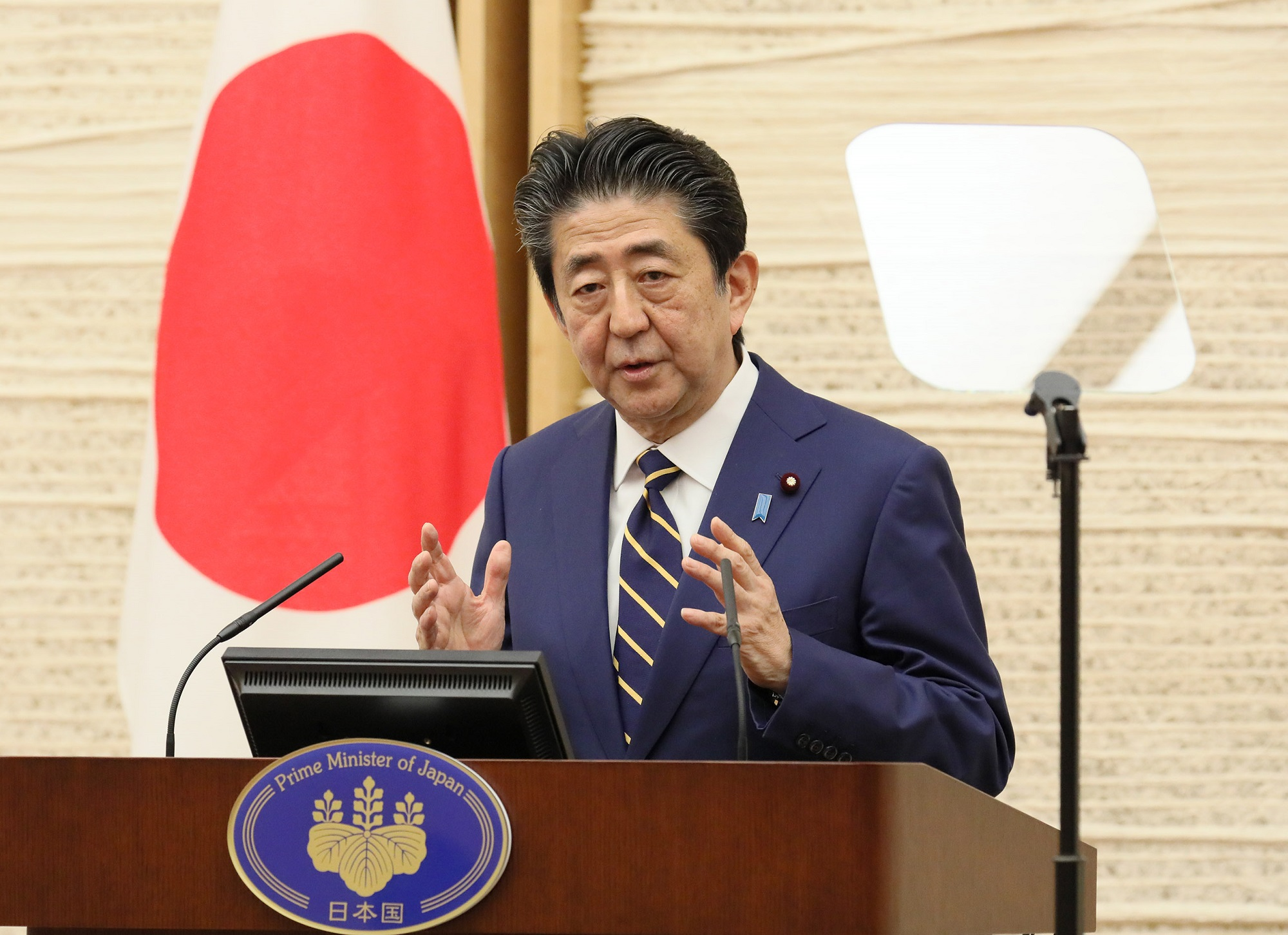
The prime minister's press conference in the lobby

=== Previous office ===
The former office building is now known as the Naikaku Sōri Daijin Kōtei (内閣総理大臣公邸), the prime minister's personal residential quarters.

With the evolution of a national parliament after the Meiji Restoration and the establishment of the post of "prime minister of Japan" in 1885, the need for an official prime ministerial residence was felt. On the encouragement of Prime Minister Tanaka Giichi, the first residence was completed on 18 March 1929. It incorporates architectural styles such as Art Deco and expressionist architecture which became popular from the late Taishō period to the early Shōwa period. It was heavily influenced by the architecture of Frank Lloyd Wright, in particular his design for the second Tokyo Imperial Hotel. It is a two-storied mansion designed by Muraji Shimomoto, of the Ministry of the Treasury (now Ministry of Finance). Prime Minister Tanaka is said to have exclaimed, "This is just like a café, isn't it?", upon seeing the building.

The building was the site of the May 15 incident in 1932 in which prime minister Inukai Tsuyoshi was assassinated. During the February 26 incident in 1936, renegade soldiers attacked the residence in an attempt to assassinate prime minister Keisuke Okada, who managed to hide in a closet. Instead, six people, including his brother-in-law, were killed. One bullet hole was retained from the 1936 event. The incidents gave rise to rumors that the residence is haunted, with the wife of prime minister Tsutomu Hata writing in a 1996 memoir that she saw spirits wearing old military uniforms in the residence's garden.

By the 1990s, the old 5,200-square-metre (56,000 sq ft) building was deemed cramped and insufficient. It underwent seismic retrofitting and internal renovation. The building was unoccupied from 2012 to 2021, during the premierships of Shinzo Abe and Yoshihide Suga.

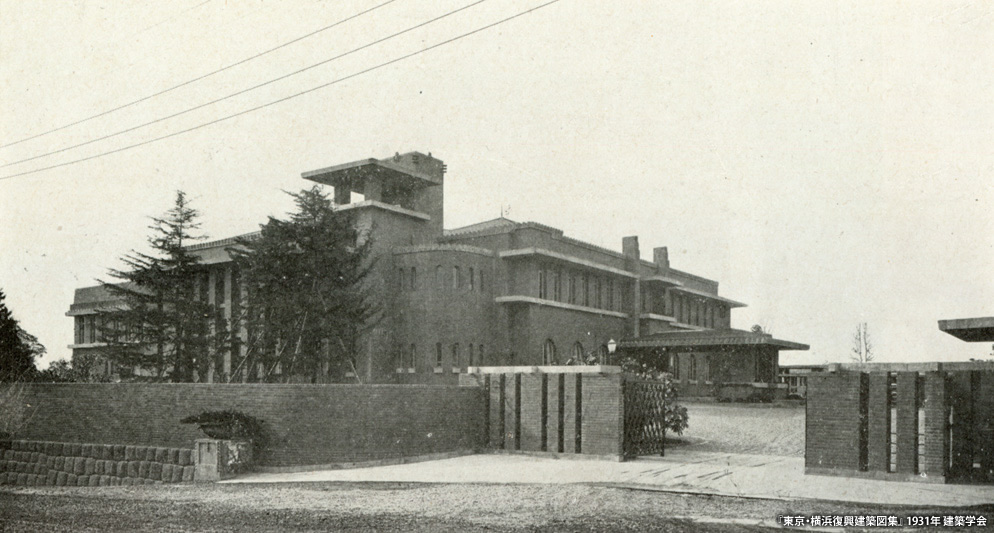
The old residence, c. 1929

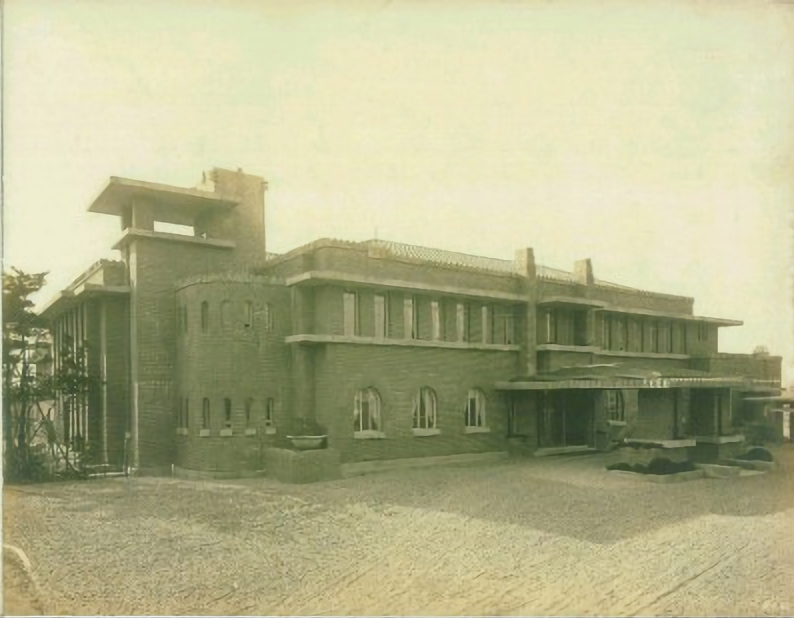
The old residence in the year of its completion, 1929

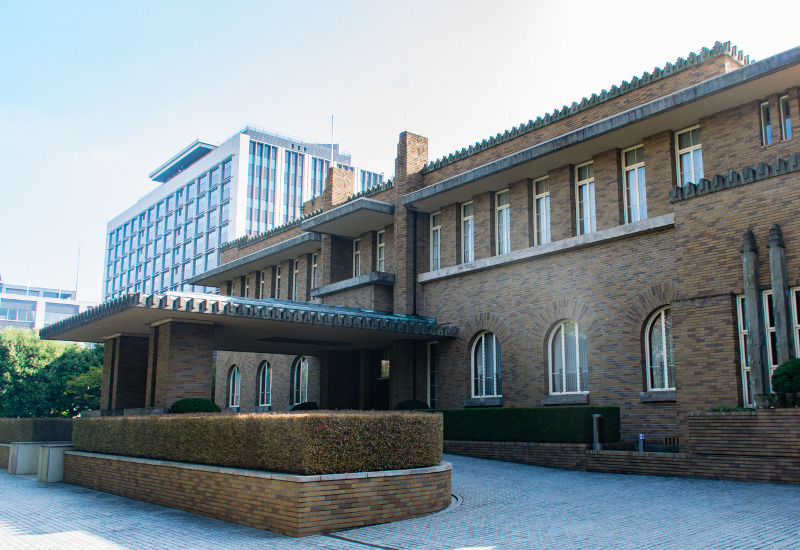
The old residence in 2022
