= Ministry of Home Affairs (Japan) =

Government ministry of Japan, 1960–2001

- 自治省; Jichi-shō
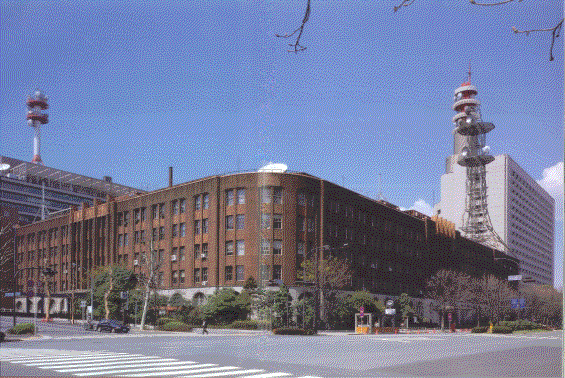
- Former Central Joint Building No. 2 where the Ministry was located

Agency overview
- Formed: July 1, 1960
- Preceding agency: Home Ministry
- Dissolved: January 5, 2001
- Superseding agency: Ministry of Internal Affairs and Communications
- Jurisdiction: Japan
- Headquarters: Chiyoda-ku, Tokyo, Japan
- Parent agency: Government of Japan
- Website: http://www.mha.go.jp:80/eng/index.html

The Ministry of Home Affairs (自治省, Jichishō) was a ministry in the Japanese government that existed from July 1, 1960, to January 5, 2001. It is now part of the Ministry of Internal Affairs and Communications. The head of the ministry was a member of the Cabinet of Japan.
