= First Koizumi cabinet =

- 87th Cabinet of Japan

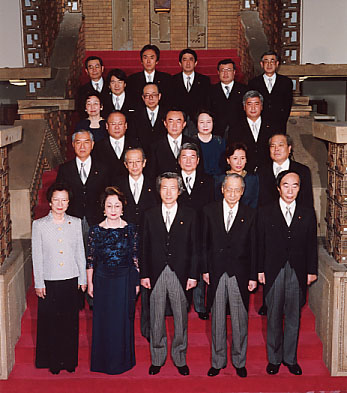
- Prime Minister Junichiro Koizumi (front row, centre) with the newly-elected cabinet inside the Kantei, April 26, 2001
- Date formed: April 26, 2001
- Date dissolved: November 19, 2003

People and organisations
- Head of state: Emperor Akihito
- Head of government: Junichiro Koizumi
- Member party: LDP-NKP-NCP coalition
- Status in legislature: Coalition majority
- Opposition party: Democratic Party of Japan
- Opposition leader: Yukio Hatoyama (until December 10, 2002); Naoto Kan (from December 10, 2002)

History
- Election: 2001 councillors election
- Predecessor: Mori II
- Successor: Koizumi II

The First Koizumi cabinet governed Japan from April 2001 until November 2003 under the leadership of Prime Minister Junichiro Koizumi, who came to power after winning a surprise victory in the LDP presidential election of 2001. The cabinet continued the LDP-Komeito-NCP coalition and contained a record number of 5 women, including Makiko Tanaka as the first female Foreign Minister. Several ministers from the previous Mori Administration remained in office to ensure the continuity and stability of government. Unusually for an LDP leader, Koizumi chose his cabinet himself and personally asked ministers to join the government, unlike previous practice where party factional leaders often chose government posts.

== Koizumi administration ==
Koizumi took office at a time of prolonged economic difficulties for Japan after the first "Lost Decade", including a banking sector affected by "bad loans". His policies promised bold structural reforms to economic, administrative and social policy using the slogans "reform with no sacred areas" and "without structural reforms there can be no economic recovery", explaining that he expected the country to endure short-term hardship, including higher unemployment, to make longer-term economic gains. Despite these promises of initial economic difficulties, the Koizumi cabinet enjoyed record popularity during its first year (reaching 90 percent in some polls), and the LDP gained several seats in the June 2001 upper house elections.

Koizumi's popularity declined significantly in early 2002 after he sacked Tanaka for disloyalty and for feuding with bureaucrats, and a series of scandals relating to the agriculture and foreign ministries came to light. In response, Koizumi ordered a quickening of the pace in terms of structural reform plans and made a highly publicised visit to North Korea in the autumn to discuss abducted Japanese citizens, which led to a recovery in his poll ratings. The first cabinet reshuffle then took place in September 2002 and did not bring about any major personnel changes, but did remove Financial Services Minister Hakuo Yanagisawa, who Koizumi felt was too timid on economic reform.

The second cabinet reshuffle took place in September 2003, following Koizumi's re-election as LDP leader by a large margin, and involved substantial changes including the promotion of the reformist Sadakazu Tanigaki to Finance Minister. Despite this, the key figures of Chief Cabinet Secretary Yasuo Fukuda and Economic and Fiscal Policy Minister Heizō Takenaka were kept in post. Koizumi then dissolved the Diet and called general elections in November 2003, which returned his coalition to office and led to the formation of the Second Koizumi Cabinet. The first Koizumi cabinet was the last to include the New Conservative Party as a coalition partner, which had declined in strength since its founding in April 2000 and finally merged with the LDP at Koizumi's suggestion after the 2003 election.

== Election of the prime minister ==
26 April 2001
House of Representatives Absolute majority (241/480) required
Choice	First Vote
Choice	Votes
Junichiro Koizumi	287 / 480
Yukio Hatoyama	127 / 480
Ozawa Ichiro	22 / 480
Shii Kazuo	20 / 480
Takako Doi	19 / 480
Abstentions (Including blank ballots)	5 / 480
Source Diet Minutes - 151st Session

== Lists of ministers ==
Liberal Democratic
New Komeito
New Conservative
Independent
R = Member of the House of Representatives
C = Member of the House of Councillors

=== Cabinet ===
First Koizumi Cabinet from April 26, 2001 to September 30, 2002
Portfolio	Minister		Term of office
Prime Minister	Junichiro Koizumi	R	April 26, 2001 - September 26, 2006
Minister for Public Management, Home Affairs, Posts and Telecommunications	Toranosuke Katayama	C	January 6, 2001 - September 22, 2003
Minister of Justice	Mayumi Moriyama	R	April 26, 2001 - September 22, 2003
Minister of Foreign Affairs	Makiko Tanaka	R	April 26, 2001 - January 30, 2002
Minister of Foreign Affairs	Junichiro Koizumi	R	January 30, 2002 - February 1, 2002
Minister of Foreign Affairs	Yoriko Kawaguchi	-	February 1, 2002 - September 27, 2004
Minister of Finance	Masajuro Shiokawa	R	April 26, 2001 - September 22, 2003
Minister of Education, Culture, Sports, Science and Technology	Atsuko Toyama	-	April 26, 2001 - September 22, 2003
Minister of Health, Labour, and Welfare	Chikara Sakaguchi	R	January 6, 2001 - September 27, 2004
Minister of Agriculture, Forestry and Fisheries	Tsutomu Takebe	R	April 26, 2001 - September 30, 2002
Minister of Economy, Trade and Industry	Takeo Hiranuma	R	January 6, 2001 - September 22, 2003
Ministry of Land, Infrastructure, Transport and Tourism	Chikage Ogi	C	January 6, 2001 - September 22, 2003
Minister of the Environment	Yoriko Kawaguchi	-	January 6, 2001 - February 8, 2002
Minister of the Environment	Hiroshi Ōki	R	February 8, 2002 - September 30, 2002
Chief Cabinet Secretary; Minister for Gender Equality	Yasuo Fukuda	R	October 27, 2000 - May 7, 2004
Director of the National Public Safety Commission; Minister for Disaster Management	Jin Murai	R	April 26, 2001 - September 30, 2002
Director of the Japan Defense Agency	Gen Nakatani	R	April 26, 2001 - September 30, 2002
Minister of State for Okinawa and Northern Territories Affairs; Minister of State (Science and Technology Policy)	Kōji Omi	R	April 26, 2001 - September 30, 2002
Minister of State for Financial Services	Hakuo Yanagisawa	R	January 6, 2001 - September 30, 2002
Minister of State for Economic and Fiscal Policy	Heizō Takenaka	-	April 26, 2001 - October 31, 2005
Minister of State for Regulatory Reform	Nobuteru Ishihara	R	April 26, 2001 - September 22, 2003
Deputy Secretaries
Deputy Chief Cabinet Secretary (Political Affairs - House of Representatives)	Shinzo Abe	R	July 4, 2000 - September 22, 2003
Deputy Chief Cabinet Secretary (Political Affairs - House of Councillors)	Kosei Ueno	C	July 4, 2000 - September 22, 2003
Deputy Chief Cabinet Secretary (Bureaucrat)	Teijiro Furukawa	-	February 24, 1995 - September 22, 2003

==== Changes ====
- January 30, 2002 - Foreign Minister Makiko Tanaka was dismissed following a series of leaks and public feuds with Foreign Ministry bureaucrats. Prime Minister Koizumi temporarily took over her duties until February 1, when Environment Minister Yoriko Kawaguchi was promoted as replacement. The senior Foreign Ministry official, Vice Minister Yoshiji Nogami was also removed.
- February 8, 2002 - Shortly after becoming Foreign Minister, Kawaguchi relinquished the Environment portfolio and was replaced by Hiroshi Ōki.

=== First reshuffled cabinet ===
First Koizumi Cabinet (First Reshuffle)
- 87th Cabinet of Japan

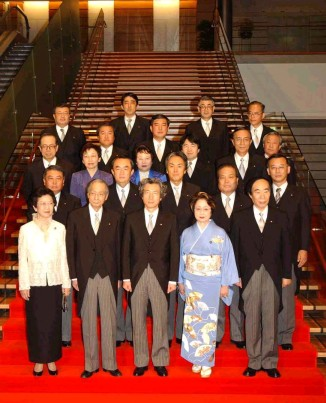
- Prime Minister Junichiro Koizumi (front row, centre) with his reshuffled cabinet inside the Kantei, September 30, 2002
- Date formed: September 30, 2002
- Date dissolved: September 22, 2003

People and organisations
- Head of state: Emperor Akihito
- Head of government: Junichiro Koizumi
- Member party: LDP-NKP-NCP coalition
- Status in legislature: Coalition majority
- Opposition party: Democratic Party of Japan
- Opposition leader: Yukio Hatoyama (until December 10, 2002); Naoto Kan (from December 10, 2002)

History
- Election: 2001 councillors election
- Predecessor: First Koizumi Cabinet
- Successor: First Koizumi Cabinet (Second Reshuffle)

First Koizumi Cabinet from September 30, 2002 to September 22, 2003
Portfolio	Minister		Term of office
Prime Minister	Junichiro Koizumi	R	April 26, 2001 - September 26, 2006
Minister for Public Management, Home Affairs, Posts and Telecommunications	Toranosuke Katayama	C	January 6, 2001 - September 22, 2003
Minister of Justice	Mayumi Moriyama	R	April 26, 2001 - September 22, 2003
Minister of Foreign Affairs	Yoriko Kawaguchi	-	February 1, 2002 - September 27, 2004
Minister of Finance	Masajuro Shiokawa	R	April 26, 2001 - September 22, 2003
Minister of Education, Culture, Sports, Science and Technology	Atsuko Toyama	-	April 26, 2001 - September 22, 2003
Minister of Health, Labour, and Welfare	Chikara Sakaguchi	R	January 6, 2001 - September 27, 2004
Minister of Agriculture, Forestry and Fisheries	Tadamori Oshima	R	September 30, 2002 - April 1, 2003
Minister of Agriculture, Forestry and Fisheries	Yoshiyuki Kamei	R	April 1, 2003 - September 27, 2004
Minister of Economy, Trade and Industry	Takeo Hiranuma	R	January 6, 2001 - September 22, 2003
Ministry of Land, Infrastructure, Transport and Tourism	Chikage Ogi	C	January 6, 2001 - September 22, 2003
Minister of the Environment	Shun'ichi Suzuki	R	September 30, 2002 - September 22, 2003
Chief Cabinet Secretary; Minister for Gender Equality	Yasuo Fukuda	R	October 27, 2000 - May 7, 2004
Director of the National Public Safety Commission	Sadakazu Tanigaki	R	September 30, 2002 - September 22, 2003
Director of the Japan Defense Agency	Shigeru Ishiba	R	September 30, 2002 - September 27, 2004
Minister of State for Okinawa and Northern Territories Affairs; Minister of State (Science and Technology Policy)	Hiroyuki Hosoda	R	September 30, 2002 - September 22, 2003
Minister of State for Economic and Fiscal Policy; Minister of State for Financial Services	Heizō Takenaka	-	April 26, 2001 - October 31, 2005
Minister of State for Regulatory Reform	Nobuteru Ishihara	R	April 26, 2001 - September 22, 2003
Minister for Disaster Management; Minister for Special Zones for Structural Reform	Yoshitada Konoike	C	September 30, 2002 - September 22, 2003
Deputy Secretaries
Deputy Chief Cabinet Secretary (Political Affairs - House of Representatives)	Shinzo Abe	R	July 4, 2000 - September 22, 2003
Deputy Chief Cabinet Secretary (Political Affairs - House of Councillors)	Kosei Ueno	C	July 4, 2000 - September 22, 2003
Deputy Chief Cabinet Secretary (Bureaucrat)	Teijiro Furukawa	-	February 24, 1995 - September 22, 2003

==== Changes ====
- December 25, 2002 - The Conservative Party was dissolved and reformed as the New Conservative Party when some members of the Democratic Party defected and allied with the Conservatives. The party continued in coalition.
- April 1, 2003 - Agriculture Minister Tadamori Oshima resigned due to a bribery scandal involving a former aide, and was replaced with Yoshiyuki Kamei.

=== Second reshuffled cabinet ===
First Koizumi Cabinet (Second Reshuffle)
- 87th Cabinet of Japan

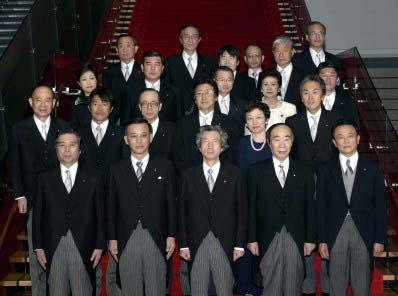
- Prime Minister Junichiro Koizumi (front row, centre) with his reshuffled cabinet inside the Kantei, September 22, 2003
- Date formed: September 22, 2003
- Date dissolved: November 19, 2003

People and organisations
- Head of state: Emperor Akihito
- Head of government: Junichiro Koizumi
- Member party: LDP-NKP-NCP coalition
- Status in legislature: Coalition majority
- Opposition party: Democratic Party of Japan
- Opposition leader: Yukio Hatoyama (until December 10, 2002); Naoto Kan (from December 10, 2002)

History
- Election: 2001 councillors election
- Predecessor: First Koizumi Cabinet (Second Reshuffle)
- Successor: Second Koizumi Cabinet

First Koizumi Cabinet from September 22, 2003 to November 19, 2003
Portfolio	Minister		Term of office
Prime Minister	Junichiro Koizumi	R	April 26, 2001 - September 26, 2006
Minister for Public Management, Home Affairs, Posts and Telecommunications	Tarō Asō	R	September 22, 2003 - October 31, 2005
Minister of Justice	Daizō Nozawa	C	September 22, 2003 - September 27, 2004
Minister of Foreign Affairs	Yoriko Kawaguchi	-	February 1, 2002 - September 27, 2004
Minister of Finance	Sadakazu Tanigaki	R	September 22, 2003 - September 26, 2006
Minister of Education, Culture, Sports, Science and Technology	Takeo Kawamura	R	September 22, 2003 - September 27, 2004
Minister of Health, Labour, and Welfare	Chikara Sakaguchi	R	January 6, 2001 - September 27, 2004
Minister of Agriculture, Forestry and Fisheries	Yoshiyuki Kamei	R	April 1, 2003 - September 27, 2004
Minister of Economy, Trade and Industry	Shōichi Nakagawa	R	September 22, 2003 - October 31, 2005
Ministry of Land, Infrastructure, Transport and Tourism	Nobuteru Ishihara	R	September 22, 2003 - September 27, 2004
Minister of the Environment	Yuriko Koike	R	September 22, 2003 - September 26, 2006
Chief Cabinet Secretary; Minister for Gender Equality	Yasuo Fukuda	R	October 27, 2000 - May 7, 2004
Director of the National Public Safety Commission	Kiyoko Ono	C	September 22, 2003 - September 27, 2004
Director of the Japan Defense Agency	Shigeru Ishiba	R	September 30, 2002 - September 27, 2004
Minister of State for Okinawa and Northern Territories Affairs; Minister of State (Science and Technology Policy); Minister of State for Personal Information Protection	Toshimitsu Motegi	R	September 22, 2003 - September 27, 2004
Minister of State for Economic and Fiscal Policy; Minister of State for Financial Services	Heizō Takenaka	-	April 26, 2001 - October 31, 2005
Minister of State for Regulatory Reform; Minister of State for Industrial Revitalization Corporation of Japan; Minister of State for Administrative Reform; Minister of State for Special Zones for Structural Reform; Minister of State for Regional Revitalization	Kazuyoshi Kaneko	R	September 22, 2003 - September 27, 2004
Minister for Disaster Management; Minister of State for National Emergency Legislation	Kiichi Inoue	R	September 22, 2003 - September 27, 2004
Deputy Secretaries
Deputy Chief Cabinet Secretary (Political Affairs - House of Representatives)	Hiroyuki Hosoda	R	September 22, 2003 - May 7, 2004
Deputy Chief Cabinet Secretary (Political Affairs - House of Councillors)	Masaaki Yamazaki	C	September 22, 2003 - October 31, 2005
Deputy Chief Cabinet Secretary (Bureaucrat)	Masahiro Futahashi	-	September 22, 2003 - September 26, 2006

==== Changes ====
- November 11, 2003 - After poor results in the general election, the New Conservative Party accepted Koizumi's suggestion that it merge with the LDP. The NCP formally dissolved on November 21.
