= Chieko Nōno =

Japanese politician (born 1935)

- 南野 知恵子
- Official portrait, 2004

Minister of Justice
- In office 27 September 2004 – 31 October 2005
- Prime Minister: Junichiro Koizumi
- Preceded by: Daizō Nozawa
- Succeeded by: Seiken Sugiura

Member of the House of Councillors
- In office 27 July 1992 – 25 July 2010
- Constituency: National PR

Personal details
- Born: 14 November 1935 (age 90) Qiqihar, Manchukuo (now Manchuria, China)
- Party: Liberal Democratic
- Education: University of Osaka

Third Realigned Koizumi Cabinet (2005-10-31)
- Secretary: Shinzō Abe
- Internal Affairs: Heizō Takenaka
- Justice: Seiken Sugiura
- Foreign Affairs: Taro Aso
- Finance: Sadakazu Tanigaki
- Education: Kenji Kosaka
- Health: Jirō Kawasaki
- Agriculture: Shoichi Nakagawa
- Economy: Toshihiro Nikai
- Land: Kazuo Kitagawa
- Environment: Yuriko Koike
- Defense: Fukushiro Nukaga
- Ministers of State: Tetsuo Kutsukake; Kaoru Yosano; Koki Chuma; Iwao Matsuda; Kuniko Inoguchi

Chieko Nohno (南野 知恵子, Nōno Chieko; born 14 November 1935) is a Japanese politician. In some English-language Japanese newspapers her family name is romanized as Noono.

She was born in Qiqihar, Manchuria in 1935 and moved to Kagoshima Prefecture at the end of World War II. She graduated from Kagoshima Prefectural Konan High School in 1954 and attended the School of Midwifery attached to the Medical Department of Osaka University. Nohno worked as a nurse for more than thirty years before beginning her political career.

She was first elected to the House of Councillors in 1992, and was reelected in 1998 and 2004. In 2001 she served as the Vice Minister for Labor for half a year. She was Minister for Combating Birth Decline and for Gender Equality.

Prime Minister Koizumi appointed her Minister of Justice on 27 September 2004. Her selection was somewhat controversial. Her background is in medicine, with no formal legal training. She is only the second woman to serve in the position. The first was Tachiko Nagao, who served for ten months in 1996.

Nohno has spoken in favor of immigration and assimilation of immigrants into Japanese society.

Political offices
Preceded by Daizō Nozawa	Minister of Justice of Japan; 2004–2005	Succeeded by Seiken Sugiura
