= Junichiro Koizumi =

Prime Minister of Japan from 2001 to 2006

- 小泉 純一郎
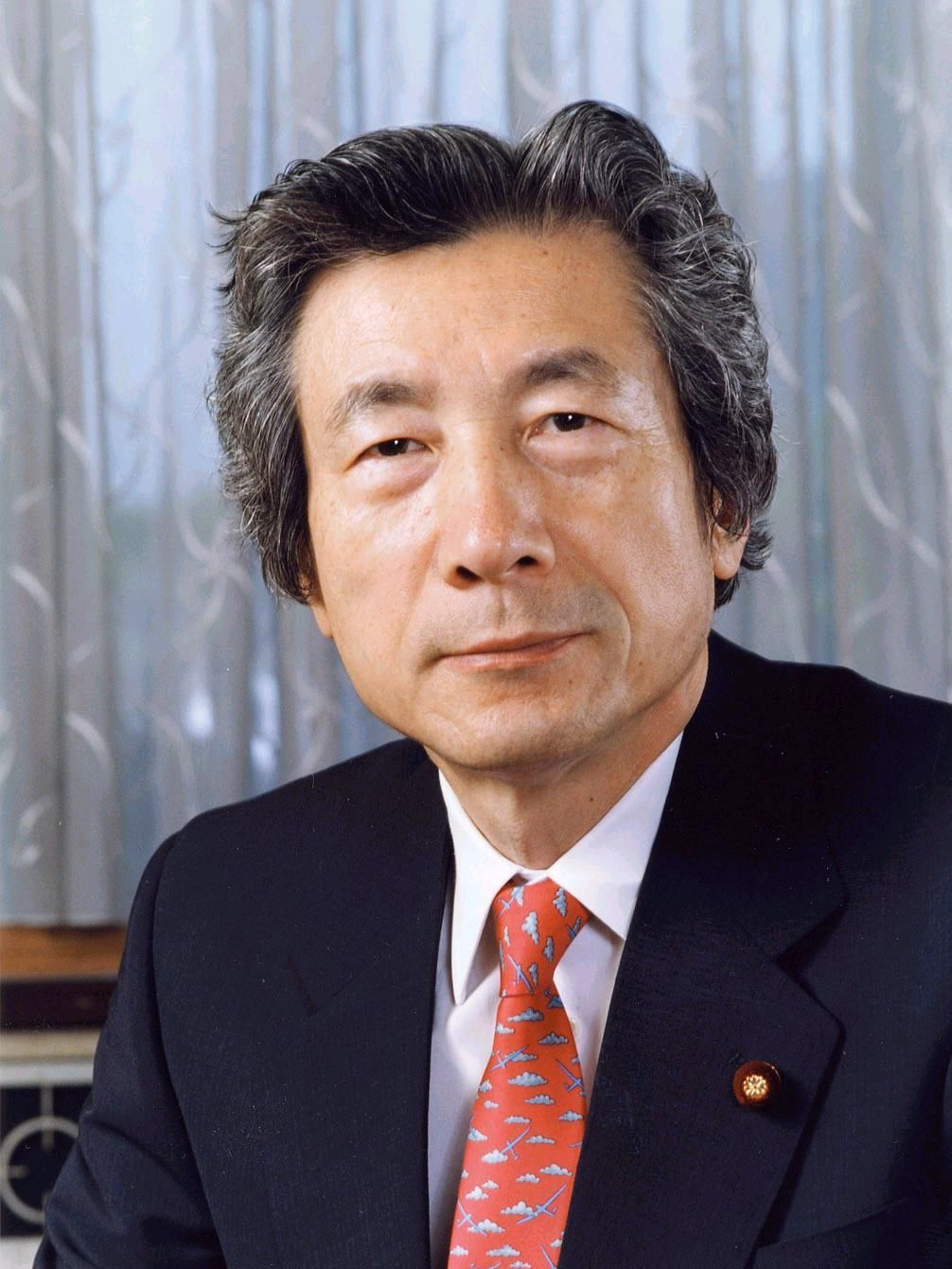
- Official portrait, 2001

Prime Minister of Japan
- In office 26 April 2001 – 26 September 2006
- Monarch: Akihito
- Preceded by: Yoshirō Mori
- Succeeded by: Shinzo Abe

President of the Liberal Democratic Party
- In office 20 April 2001 – 20 September 2006
- Vice President: Taku Yamasaki
- Secretary-General: Taku Yamasaki; Shinzo Abe; Tsutomu Takebe
- Preceded by: Yoshirō Mori
- Succeeded by: Shinzo Abe

Minister of Health and Welfare
- In office 7 November 1996 – 29 July 1998
- Prime Minister: Ryutaro Hashimoto
- Preceded by: Naoto Kan
- Succeeded by: Sohei Miyashita
- In office 27 December 1988 – 10 August 1989
- Prime Minister: Noboru Takeshita; Sōsuke Uno
- Preceded by: Takao Fujimoto
- Succeeded by: Saburo Toida

Minister of Post and Telecommunications
- In office 12 December 1992 – 20 July 1993
- Prime Minister: Kiichi Miyazawa
- Preceded by: Hideo Watanabe
- Succeeded by: Kiichi Miyazawa

Member of the House of Representatives; from Kanagawa
- In office 10 December 1972 – 21 July 2009
- Preceded by: Multi-member district
- Succeeded by: Shinjirō Koizumi
- Constituency: 2nd district (1972–1996); 11th district (1996–2009)

Personal details
- Born: 8 January 1942 (age 84) Yokosuka, Kanagawa, Japan
- Party: Liberal Democratic
- Spouse: Kayoko Miyamoto (m. 1978; div. 1982)
- Children: Kōtarō Koizumi; Shinjirō Koizumi; Yoshinaga Miyamoto
- Parent(s): Jun'ya Koizumi (father); Yoshie Koizumi (mother)
- Relatives: Koizumi family
- Education: Keio University (BEc); University College London

Junichiro Koizumi (/kɔɪˈzuːmi/ koy-ZOO-mee; 小泉 純一郎, Koizumi Jun'ichirō [ko̞iꜜzɨmʲi (d)ʑɨ̃ɰ̃iꜜtɕiɾo̞ː]; born 8 January 1942) is a Japanese retired politician who served as Prime Minister of Japan and president of the Liberal Democratic Party (LDP) from 2001 to 2006. He retired from politics in 2009. He is the sixth-longest serving and second longest-uninterrupted serving Prime Minister in Japanese history.

Coming from the prominent Koizumi family, Koizumi was first elected to the House of Representatives in 1972. He became the Parliamentary Vice Minister of Finance in 1979, before gaining his ministerial post in 1988 as Minister of Health and Welfare, which he served until 1989. He served as the Minister of Posts and Telecommunications from 1992 to 1993, and again as the Minister of Health and Welfare from 1996 to 1998. During this time, he became part of a new LDP faction, Shinseiki, and ran in the LDP leadership elections of 1995 and 1998, losing both times. In 2001, he again contested the LDP leadership, which he won.

Widely seen as a maverick leader of the LDP upon his election to the position in 2001, Koizumi became known as a neoliberal economic reformer, focusing on reducing Japan's government debt and the privatisation of the Japan Post. In the 2005 election, Koizumi led the LDP to win one of the largest parliamentary majorities in modern Japanese history. Koizumi also attracted international attention through his deployment of the Japan Self-Defense Forces to Iraq, and through his visits to the Yasukuni Shrine that fueled diplomatic tensions with neighbouring China and South Korea. Koizumi resigned as prime minister in 2006.

Although Koizumi maintained a low profile for several years after he left office, he returned to national attention in 2013 as an advocate for abandoning nuclear power in Japan, in the wake of the 2011 Fukushima nuclear disaster, which contrasted with the pro-nuclear views espoused by the LDP governments both during and after Koizumi's term in office.

== Early life ==
Koizumi is a third-generation politician of the Koizumi family. His father, Jun'ya Koizumi, was director general of the Japan Defense Agency and a member of the House of Representatives. His grandfather, Koizumi Matajirō, called "Tattoo Minister" because of a large tattoo on his body, was Minister of Posts and Telecommunications under Prime Ministers Hamaguchi and Wakatsuki and an early advocate of postal privatization.

Born in Yokosuka, Kanagawa on 8 January 1942, Koizumi was educated at Yokosuka High School. He graduated with a Bachelor of Economics degree from Keio University. He attended University College London before returning to Japan in August 1969 upon the death of his father.

He stood for election to the lower house in December; however, he did not earn enough votes to win election as a Liberal Democratic Party (LDP) representative. In 1970, he was hired as a secretary to Takeo Fukuda, who was Minister of Finance at the time and was elected as prime minister in 1976.

In the general elections of December 1972, Koizumi was elected as a member of the Lower House for Kanagawa's 2nd district, a seat previously held by his father. He joined Fukuda's faction within the LDP. After that, he was re-elected ten times.

== Member of House of Representatives ==
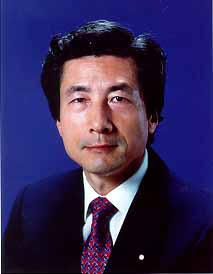
Koizumi as Health Minister, 1997

Koizumi gained his first senior post in 1979 as Parliamentary Vice Minister of Finance, and his first ministerial post in 1988 as Minister of Health and Welfare under Prime Ministers Noboru Takeshita and Sōsuke Uno. He held cabinet posts again in 1992 (Minister of Posts and Telecommunications in the Miyazawa cabinet) and 1996–1998 (Minister of Health and Welfare in the Hashimoto cabinets).

In 1994, with the LDP in opposition, Koizumi became part of a new LDP faction, Shinseiki, made up of younger and more motivated parliamentarians led by Taku Yamasaki, Koichi Kato and Koizumi, a group popularly dubbed "YKK" after the zipper manufacturer YKK.

After Prime Minister Morihiro Hosokawa resigned in 1994 and the LDP returned to power in a coalition government, Koizumi and Hosokawa teamed up with Shusei Tanaka of New Party Sakigake in a strategic dialogue across party lines regarding Japan becoming a permanent member of the United Nations Security Council. Although this idea was not popular within the LDP and never came to fruition, Koizumi and Hosokawa maintained a close working relationship across party lines, with Hosokawa tacitly serving as Koizumi's personal envoy to China during times of strained Sino-Japanese relations.

Koizumi competed for the presidency of the LDP in September 1995 and July 1998, but he gained little support losing decisively to Ryutaro Hashimoto and then Keizō Obuchi, both of whom had broader bases of support within the party. However, after Yamasaki and Kato were humiliated in a disastrous attempt to force a vote of no confidence against Prime Minister Yoshirō Mori in 2000, Koizumi became the last remaining credible member of the YKK trio, which gave him leverage over the reform-minded wing of the party.

On 24 April 2001, Koizumi was elected president of the LDP. He was initially considered an outside candidate against Hashimoto, who was running for his second term as prime minister. However, in the first poll of prefectural party organizations, Koizumi won 87 to 11 percent; in the second vote of Diet members, Koizumi won 51 to 40 percent. He defeated Hashimoto by a final tally of 298 to 155 votes. He was made Prime Minister of Japan on 26 April, and his coalition secured 78 of 121 seats in the Upper House elections in July.

== Premiership (2001–2006) ==
=== Domestic policy ===
Within Japan, Koizumi pushed for new ways to revitalise the moribund economy, aiming to act against bad debts with commercial banks, privatize the postal savings system, and reorganize the factional structure of the LDP. He spoke of the need for a period of painful restructuring in order to improve the future. To design policy initiatives in 2001 he used the new Council on Economic and Fiscal Policy (Keizai Zaisei Seisaku Tanto Daijin) or CEFP. It issued an annual planning document, "Basic Policies for Economic and Fiscal Management and Reform". It planned a major reorganization of the central government, and shaped economic policy in cooperation with key cabinet members. To meet the challenge of economic stagnation CEFP took an integrated approach, a worldwide economic view, and, promoted greater transparency; its philosophy was neoliberal.

In the fall of 2002, Koizumi appointed Keio University economist and frequent television commentator Heizō Takenaka as Minister of State for Financial Services and head of the Financial Services Agency (FSA) to fix the country's banking crisis. Bad debts of banks were dramatically cut with the NPL ratio of major banks approaching half the level of 2001. The Japanese economy went through a slow but steady recovery, and the stock market dramatically rebounded. The GDP growth for 2004 was one of the highest among G7 nations, according to the International Monetary Fund and Organisation for Economic Co-operation and Development. Takenaka was appointed as a Postal Reform Minister in 2004 for the privatization of Japan Post, operator of the country's Postal Savings system.

Koizumi moved the LDP away from its traditional rural agrarian base toward a more urban, neoliberal core, as Japan's population grew in major cities and declined in less populated areas, although under current purely geographical districting, rural votes in Japan are still many times more powerful than urban ones. In addition to the privatization of Japan Post (which many rural residents fear will reduce their access to basic services such as banking), Koizumi also slowed down the LDP's heavy subsidies for infrastructure and industrial development in rural areas. These tensions made Koizumi a controversial but popular figure within his own party and among the Japanese electorate. Considering both his neoliberal policies and his appeal to populist ideas, Koizumi's political ideology has been characterized "as a populist version of neoliberalism (or as a variant of the populist right) rather than neoliberal populism."

=== Foreign policy ===
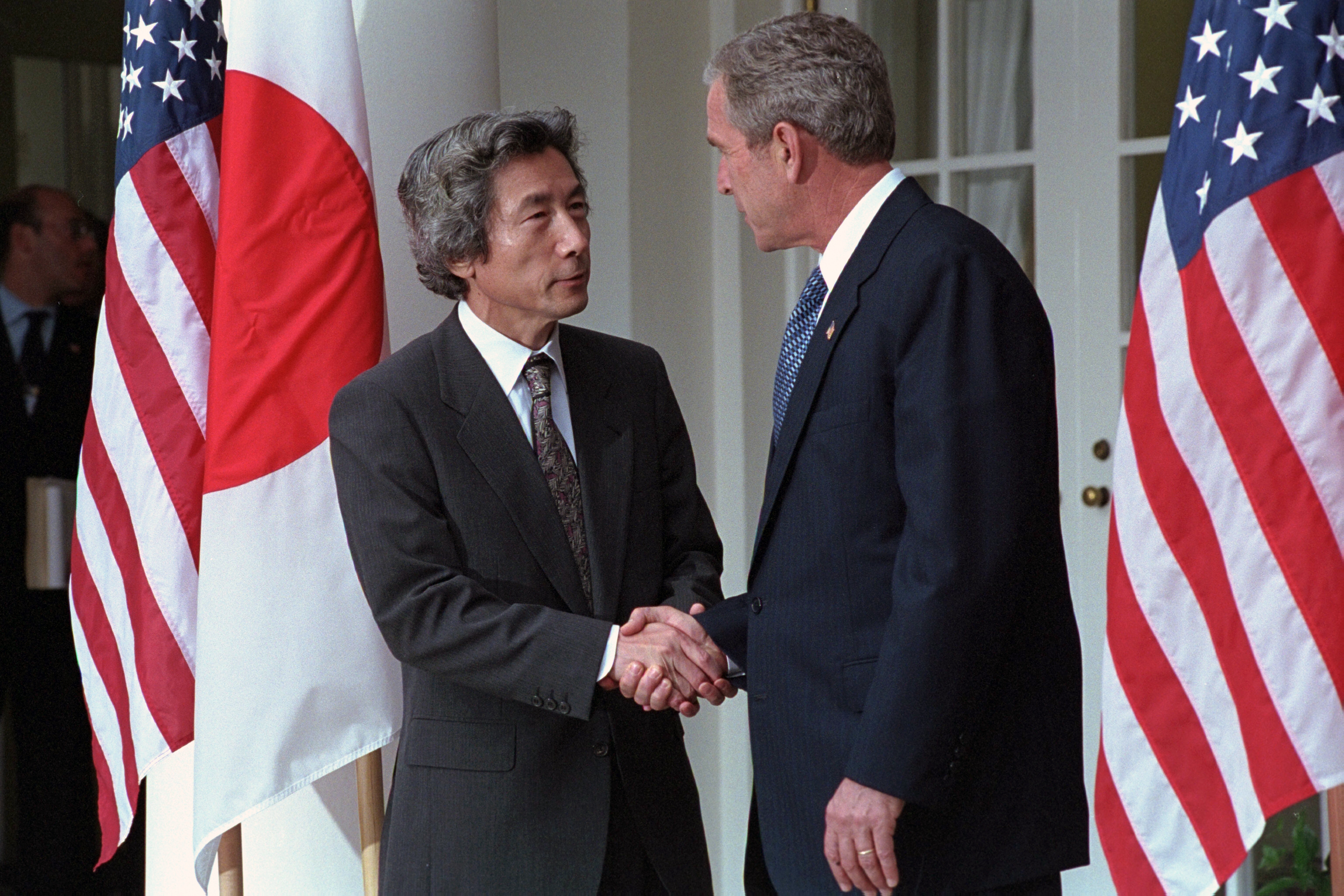
Japanese Prime Minister Koizumi and U.S. President George W. Bush meet at the White House on 25 September 2001.

Although Koizumi's foreign policy was focused on closer relations with the United States and UN-centered diplomacy, which were adopted by all of his predecessors, he went further, supporting the US policies in the war on terrorism. He decided to deploy the Japan Self-Defense Forces to Iraq, which was the first Japanese military mission in an active foreign war zone since the end of World War II. Many Japanese commentators observed that favorable US-Japan relations were based on Koizumi's personal friendship with US President George W. Bush. White House officials described the first meeting between Koizumi and Bush at Camp David as "incredibly warm", with the two men playing catch with a baseball. Since leaving office, he has defended his decision to send Japanese troops to Iraq. Koizumi also took more assertive attitudes than his predecessors on the issues of North Korean abductions and nuclear development.

==== Self-Defense Forces policy ====
Although Koizumi did not initially campaign on the issue of defense reform, he approved the expansion of the Japan Self-Defense Forces (JSDF) and in October 2001 they were given greater scope to operate outside of the country. Some of these troops were dispatched to Iraq. Koizumi's government also introduced a bill to upgrade the Defense Agency to ministry status; finally, the Defense Agency became the Japanese Ministry of Defense on 9 January 2007.

==== Visits to Yasukuni Shrine ====
Koizumi has often been noted for his controversial visits to the Yasukuni Shrine, starting on 13 August 2001. He visited the shrine six times as prime minister. Because the shrine honors Japan's war dead, which also include many convicted Japanese war criminals and 14 executed Class A war criminals, these visits drew strong condemnation and protests from both Japan's neighbours, mainly China and South Korea, and many Japanese citizens. China and South Korea's people hold bitter memories of Japanese invasion and occupation during the first half of the 20th century. China and South Korea refused to have their representatives meet Koizumi in Japan and their countries. There were no mutual visits between Chinese and Japanese leaders from October 2001, and between South Korean and Japanese leaders from June 2005. The standstill ended when the next prime minister Abe visited China and South Korea in October 2006.

In China, the visits contributed to widespread anti-Japanese riots, which were also accompanied by other more peaceful large anti-Japan demonstrations across East Asia. The president, ruling and opposition parties, and much of the media of South Korea openly condemned Koizumi's pilgrimages. Many Koreans applauded the president's speeches criticizing Japan, despite the South Korean President's low popularity. When asked about the reaction, Koizumi said the speeches were "for the domestic (audience)".

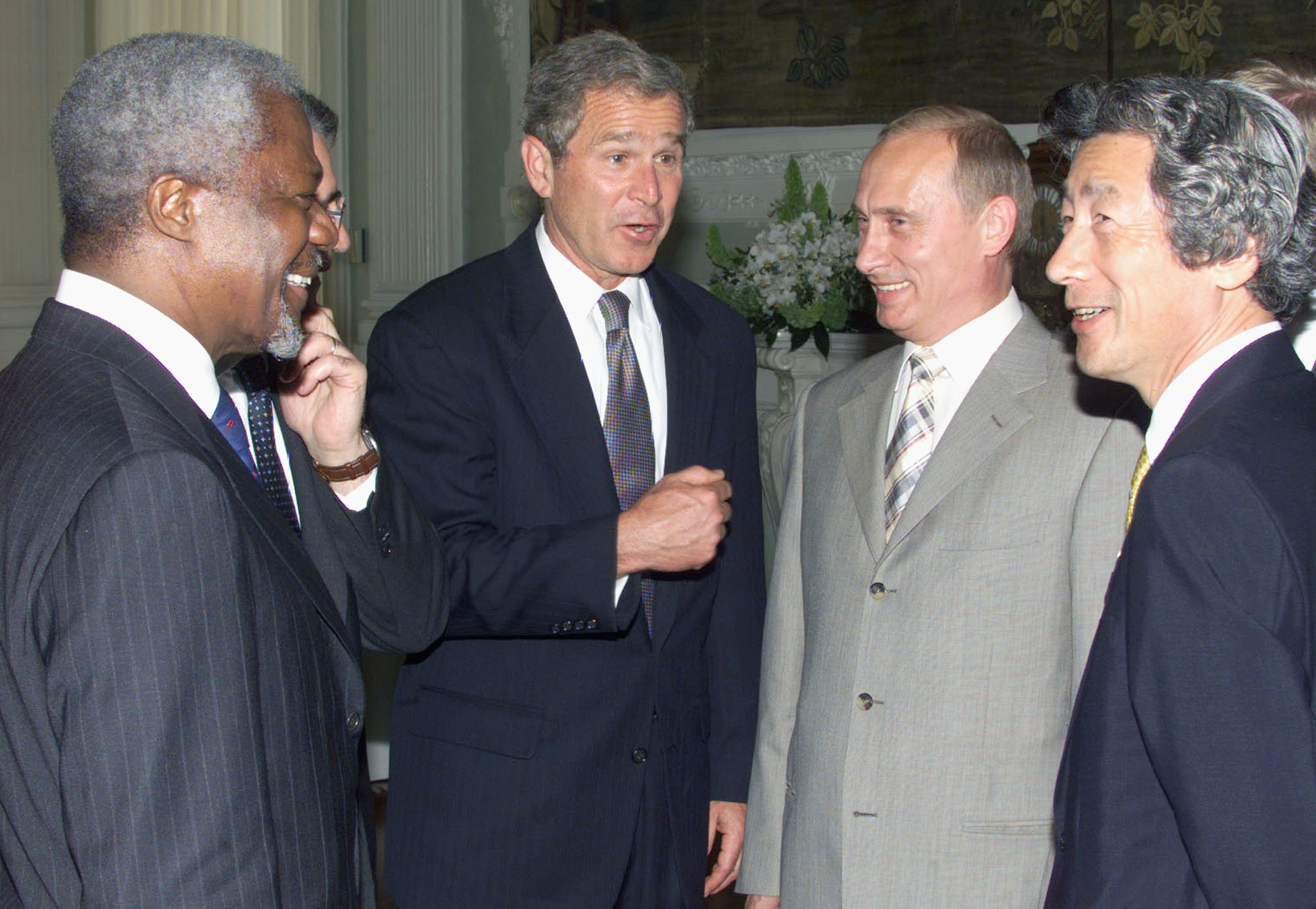
Koizumi with Kofi Annan, George W. Bush and Vladimir Putin, 20 July 2001

Although Koizumi signed the shrine's visitor book as "Junichiro Koizumi, the Prime Minister of Japan", he claimed that his visits were as a private citizen and not an endorsement of any political stance. China and Korea considered this excuse insufficient. Several journals and news reports in Japan, such as one published by Kyodo News Agency on 15 August 2006, questioned Koizumi's statement of private purpose, as he unreservedly recorded his position on the shrine's guestbook as prime minister. He visited the shrine annually in fulfillment of a campaign pledge. Koizumi's last visit as prime minister was on 15 August 2006, fulfilling a campaign pledge to visit on the anniversary of Japan's surrender in World War II.

Eleven months after his resignation as prime minister, Koizumi revisited the shrine on 15 August 2007 to mark the 62nd anniversary of Japan's surrender in World War II. His 2007 visit attracted less attention from the media than his prior visits while he was in office.

==== Statements on World War II ====
On 15 August 2005, the sixtieth anniversary of the end of World War II, Koizumi publicly stated that "I would like to express keen remorse and heartfelt apologies" and vowed Japan would never again take "the path to war".

=== Popularity ===
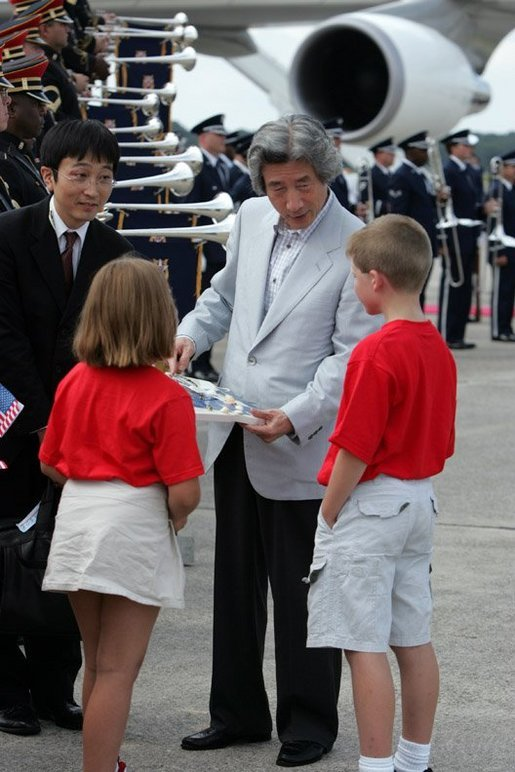
Koizumi meets children in Sea Island, Georgia, shortly before the 2004 G8 summit, hosted by the United States.

Koizumi was an extremely popular leader at certain points in his tenure. His outspoken nature and colourful past contributed to that, and his nicknames included "Lionheart" and "Maverick". During his time in office, the Japanese public referred to him as Jun-chan (the suffix "chan" in the Japanese language is used as a term of familiarity, typically between children, "Jun" is a contraction of Junichiro). In June 2001, he enjoyed an approval rating of 80 percent.

In January 2002, Koizumi fired his Foreign Minister Makiko Tanaka, replacing her with Yoriko Kawaguchi. Tanaka had enjoyed high public approval ratings. A few days before her dismissal, when she was filmed crying after a dispute with government officials, Koizumi generated controversy with his statement "tears are women's ultimate weapons". Following an economic slump and a series of LDP scandals that claimed the career of YKK member Koichi Kato, by April Koizumi's popularity rating had fallen 30 percentage points since his nomination as prime minister.

Koizumi was re-elected in 2003 and his popularity surged as the economy recovered. His proposal to cut pension benefits as a move to fiscal reform turned out to be highly unpopular. Two visits to North Korea to solve the issue of abducted Japanese nationals only somewhat raised his popularity, as he could not secure several abductees' returns to Japan. In the House of Councilors elections in 2004, the LDP performed only marginally better than the opposition Democratic Party of Japan (DPJ), winning 32 more seats than the latter obtained.

In 2005, the House of Councilors rejected the contentious postal privatization bills. Koizumi previously made it clear that he would dissolve the lower house if the bill failed to pass. The Democratic Party, while expressing support for the privatization, made a tactical vote against the bill. Fifty-one LDP members also either voted against the bills or abstained.

On 8 August 2005, Koizumi, as promised, dissolved the House of Representatives and called for snap elections. He expelled rebel LDP members for not supporting the bill. The LDP's chances for success were initially uncertain; the secretary general of New Komeito (a junior coalition partner with Koizumi's Liberal Democratic Party) said that his party would entertain forming a coalition government with the Democratic Party of Japan if the DPJ took a majority in the House of Representatives.

Koizumi's popularity rose almost twenty points after he dissolved the House and expelled rebel LDP members. Opinion polls ranked the government's approval ratings between 58 and 65 percent. The electorate saw the election in terms of a vote for or against reform of the postal service, which the Democratic Party and rebel LDP members were seen as being against.

The September 2005 elections were the LDP's largest victory since 1986, giving the party a large majority in the House of Representatives and nullifying opposing voices in the House of Councilors. In the following Diet session, the last to be held under Koizumi's government, the LDP passed 82 of its 91 proposed bills, including postal privatization. A number of Koizumi-supported candidates known as "Koizumi Children" joined the Diet in this election and supported successive LDP governments until the 2009 elections, when most were defeated.

== Retirement ==
Koizumi announced that he would step down from office in 2006, per LDP rules, and would not personally choose a successor as many LDP prime ministers have in the past. On 20 September 2006, Shinzo Abe was elected to succeed Koizumi as president of the LDP. Abe succeeded Koizumi as prime minister on 26 September 2006.

Koizumi remained in the Diet through the administrations of Abe and Yasuo Fukuda, but announced his retirement from politics on 25 September 2008, shortly following the election of Taro Aso as prime minister. He retained his Diet seat until the next general election, when his son Shinjiro was elected into the same seat representing the Kanagawa 11th district in 2009. Koizumi supported future Governor of Tokyo Yuriko Koike in the LDP leadership election held earlier in September 2008, but Koike placed a distant third.

Since leaving office as prime minister, Koizumi has not granted a single request for an interview or television appearance, although he has given speeches and had private interactions with journalists.

== Anti-nuclear advocacy ==
Koizumi returned to the national spotlight in October 2013, after seven years of largely avoiding attention, when he gave a speech to business executives in Nagoya in which he stated: "We should aim to be nuclear-free... If the Liberal Democratic Party were to adopt a zero-nuclear policy, then we'd see a groundswell of support for getting rid of nuclear energy." He recalled Japan's reconstruction in the wake of World War II and called for the country to "unite toward a dream of achieving a society based on renewable energy."

Koizumi had been a proponent of nuclear power throughout his term as prime minister, and was one of the first pro-nuclear politicians to change his stance on the issue in the wake of the Fukushima disaster of 2011. His dramatic remarks were widely covered in the Japanese media, with some tabloids speculating that he may break away from the LDP to form a new party with his son Shinjiro. Economy Minister Akira Amari characterized Koizumi's stance as pure but simplistic, while other LDP administration officials downplayed the potential impact of Koizumi's views. Former prime minister Naoto Kan, however, expressed hope that Koizumi's status as then-Prime Minister Shinzo Abe's "boss" would help put pressure on the government to minimize or eliminate nuclear power in Japan.

Koizumi defended his change of stance, stating in November that "it is overly optimistic and much more irresponsible to think nuclear power plants can be maintained just with the completion of disposal facilities... We had failed to secure sites for final disposal even before an accident occurred," concluding that "it's better to spend money on developing natural energy resources—citizens are more likely to agree with that idea—than using such large amounts of expenses and energy to advance such a feckless project [as nuclear power]." He explained that in August, he had visited a nuclear waste disposal facility in Finland, where he learned that nuclear waste would have to be sealed up for 100,000 years. A poll by the Asahi Shimbun in November 2013 found that 54% of the public supported Koizumi's anti-nuclear statements. Koizumi told one reporter that he felt lied to by the Federation of Electric Power Companies of Japan, which characterized nuclear power as a safe alternative to fossil fuels, stating that "we certainly had no idea how difficult it is to control nuclear energy."

Koizumi reportedly approached Morihiro Hosokawa, who served as prime minister in an anti-LDP coalition cabinet in the 1990s, to run for Governor of Tokyo in the February 2014 gubernatorial election on the platform of opposing the Abe government's pro-nuclear policy. Hosokawa ran in the election with Koizumi's support but lost to the LDP-supported candidate Yōichi Masuzoe. Koizumi and Hosokawa continued their collaboration in the wake of this defeat, organizing an anti-nuclear forum to be held in May 2014.

Koizumi traveled to the United States in 2016 in support of a lawsuit by Operation Tomodachi participants who claimed illness from radiation exposure caused by the Fukushima disaster.

== Personal life ==
Koizumi lives in Yokosuka, Kanagawa.

=== Family ===
Koizumi married 21-year-old university student Kayoko Miyamoto in 1978. The couple had been formally introduced to each other as potential spouses, a common practice known as omiai. The wedding ceremony at the Tokyo Prince Hotel was attended by about 2,500 people, including Takeo Fukuda (then Prime Minister), and featured a wedding cake shaped like the National Diet Building. The marriage ended in divorce in 1982, as Kayoko was reportedly unhappy with her married life for several reasons. After this divorce, Koizumi never married again, saying that divorce consumed ten times more energy than marriage.

Koizumi had custody of two of his three sons: Kōtarō Koizumi and Shinjirō Koizumi, who were reared by one of his sisters. Shinjiro is the representative for Kanagawa's 11th district, a position his father has also filled, while Kotaro is an actor. The youngest son, Yoshinaga Miyamoto, now a graduate of Keio University, was born following the divorce and did not meet Koizumi for many years. Yoshinaga is known to have attended one of Koizumi's rallies, but was turned away from trying to meet his father. He was also turned away from attending his paternal grandmother's funeral. Koizumi's ex-wife Kayoko Miyamoto also asked unsuccessfully several times to meet their two eldest sons. Yoshinaga met his father and brothers for the first time in 2010, at a meeting arranged by Shinjiro. Koizumi and his two elder sons also attended Yoshinaga's wedding in 2013.

Koizumi is known to have a cousin in Brazil, and was overwhelmed to the point of tears when he visited Brazil in 2004 and was met by a group of Japanese immigrants.

=== Interests ===
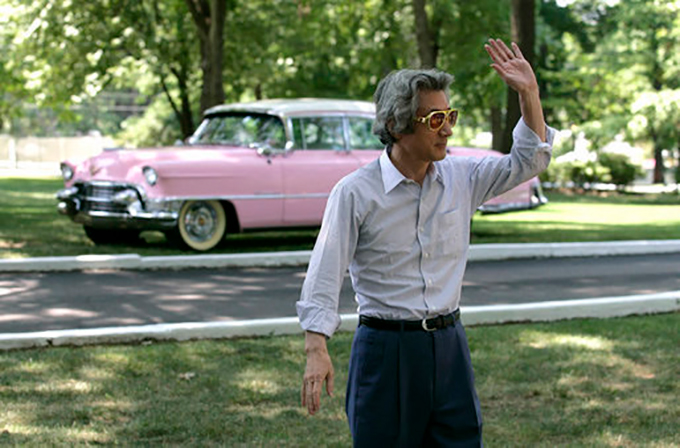
Koizumi, hosted by U.S. President George W. Bush, at Graceland in 2006

Koizumi is a fan of German composer Richard Wagner and has released a CD of his favorite pieces by contemporary Italian composer Ennio Morricone. He is also a fan of the heavy metal band X Japan, with the LDP having even used their song "Forever Love" in television commercials in 2001. It was also reported that he was influential in getting the museum honoring X Japan's deceased guitarist Hide made.

Koizumi is also a noted fan of Elvis Presley, with whom he shares a birthday (8 January). In 2001, he released a collection of his favorite Presley songs on CD, with his comments about each song. His brother is Senior Advisor of the Tokyo Elvis Presley Fan Club. Koizumi and his brother helped finance a statue of Presley in Tokyo's Harajuku district. On 30 June 2006, Koizumi visited Presley's estate, Graceland, accompanied by U.S. President George W. Bush, and First Lady Laura Bush. After arriving in Memphis aboard Air Force One, they headed to Graceland. While there, Koizumi briefly sang a few bars of his favourite Presley tunes, whilst warmly impersonating Presley, and wearing Presley's trademark oversized golden sunglasses.

Koizumi is also a fan of Finnish composer Jean Sibelius. On 8 September 2006, he and Finnish Prime Minister Matti Vanhanen visited the Sibelius' home, where Koizumi showed respect to the late composer with a moment of silence. He owns reproductions of the manuscripts of all seven symphonies by Sibelius.

In 2009, Koizumi made a voice acting appearance in an Ultra Series feature film, Mega Monster Battle: Ultra Galaxy Legend The Movie, playing the voice of Ultraman King. Koizumi said he took on the role at the urging of his son Shinjiro. His political career is parodied in a seinen manga, Mudazumo Naki Kaikaku, which re-interprets his life as a mahjong master.

He has been compared many times to American actor Richard Gere, because of their similar hair style. In 2005, he used the latter as a boost for his falling popularity, by staging an "impromptu ballroom dance performance".

== Koizumi cabinets ==
	First (26 April 2001)	First, Realigned (30 September 2002)	Second (19 November 2003)	Second, Realigned (22 September 2004)	Third, Realigned (31 October 2005)
Secretary	Yasuo Fukuda ^{4}			Hiroyuki Hosoda	Shinzō Abe
Internal Affairs	Toranosuke Katayama		Taro Aso		Heizō Takenaka ^{3}
Justice	Mayumi Moriyama		Daizō Nozawa	Chieko Nohno	Seiken Sugiura
Foreign Affairs	Makiko Tanaka ^{1}	Yoriko Kawaguchi		Nobutaka Machimura	Taro Aso
Finance	Masajuro Shiokawa		Sadakazu Tanigaki		
Education	Fumio Kishida		Takeo Kawamura	Nariaki Nakayama	Kenji Kosaka
Health	Chikara Sakaguchi			Hidehisa Otsuji	Jirō Kawasaki
Agriculture	Tsutomu Takebe	Tadamori Oshima ^{2}	Yoshiyuki Kamei	Yoshinobu Shimamura	Shoichi Nakagawa
Economy	Takeo Hiranuma		Shōichi Nakagawa		Toshihiro Nikai
Land	Chikage Oogi		Nobuteru Ishihara	Kazuo Kitagawa	
Environment	Hiroshi Oki ^{1}	Shunichi Suzuki	Yuriko Koike		
Public Safety	Jin Murai	Sadakazu Tanigaki	Kiyoko Ono	Yoshitaka Murata	Tetsuo Kutsukake
Disaster Prevention	Jin Murai	Yoshitada Konoike	Kiichi Inoue	Yoshitaka Murata	Tetsuo Kutsukake
Defense	Gen Nakatani	Shigeru Ishiba		Yoshinori Ohno	Fukushiro Nukaga
Economic Policy	Heizō Takenaka ^{3}	Heizō Takenaka		Heizō Takenaka	Kaoru Yosano
Financial Affairs	Hakuo Yanagisawa	Heizō Takenaka		Tatsuya Ito	Kaoru Yosano
Admin. and Reg. Reform	Nobuteru Ishihara		Kazuyoshi Kaneko	Seiichiro Murakami	Kōki Chūma
Technology	Koji Omi	Hiroyuki Hosoda	Toshimitsu Motegi	Yasufumi Tanahashi	Iwao Matsuda
Youth and Gender					Kuniko Inoguchi

Notes:

1. Makiko Tanaka was fired on 29 January 2002. Koizumi served as interim foreign minister until 1 February, when he appointed then-environment minister Yoriko Kawaguchi to the post. Koizumi appointed Hiroshi Oki to replace Kawaguchi.
2. Oshima resigned on 31 March 2003, due to a farm-subsidy scandal. He was replaced by Kamei, who was kept in the next reshuffle.
3. Takenaka has also held the portfolio of Minister of State for Postal Privatization since the first Koizumi cabinet. He is the only person to serve on Koizumi's cabinet through all five reshuffles.
4. Fukuda resigned on 7 May 2004, and was replaced by Hosoda.

== See also ==
- List of prime ministers of Japan
- First Koizumi Cabinet
- Second Koizumi Cabinet
- Third Koizumi Cabinet

Party political offices
Preceded by Yoshirō Mori	President of the Liberal Democratic Party; 2001–2006	Succeeded by Shinzō Abe
Political offices
Preceded by Takao Fujimoto	Minister of Health and Welfare; 1988–1989	Succeeded by Saburo Toida
Preceded by Hideo Watanabe	Minister of Posts and Telecommunications; 1992–1993	Succeeded by Kiichi Miyazawa
Preceded by Naoto Kan	Minister of Health and Welfare; 1996–1998	Succeeded by Sohei Miyashita
Preceded by Yoshirō Mori	Prime Minister of Japan; 2001–2006	Succeeded by Shinzō Abe
