= Kenji Kosaka (politician) =

Japanese politician (1946–2016)

- 小坂 憲次
- Official portrait, 2005

Minister of Education, Culture, Sports, Science and Technology
- In office 31 October 2005 – 26 September 2006
- Prime Minister: Junichiro Koizumi
- Preceded by: Nariaki Nakayama
- Succeeded by: Bunmei Ibuki

Member of the House of Councillors
- In office 26 July 2010 – 25 July 2016
- Constituency: National PR

Member of the House of Representatives
- In office 19 February 1990 – 21 July 2009
- Preceded by: Zentarō Kosaka
- Succeeded by: Takashi Shinohara
- Constituency: Former Nagano 1st (1990–1996); Nagano 1st (1996–2009)

Personal details
- Born: 12 March 1946 Nagano City, Nagano, Japan
- Died: 21 October 2016 (aged 70) Shinjuku, Tokyo, Japan
- Party: Liberal Democratic (1990–1993; 1998–2016)
- Other political affiliations: JRP (1993–1994); NFP (1994–1996); Sun Party (1996–1998); GGP (1998)
- Parent: Zentarō Kosaka (father)
- Education: Keio University

Third Realigned Koizumi Cabinet (2005-10-31)
- Secretary: Shinzō Abe
- Internal Affairs: Heizō Takenaka
- Justice: Seiken Sugiura
- Foreign Affairs: Taro Aso
- Finance: Sadakazu Tanigaki
- Education: Kenji Kosaka
- Health: Jirō Kawasaki
- Agriculture: Shoichi Nakagawa
- Economy: Toshihiro Nikai
- Land: Kazuo Kitagawa
- Environment: Yuriko Koike
- Defense: Fukushiro Nukaga
- Ministers of State: Tetsuo Kutsukake; Kaoru Yosano; Koki Chuma; Iwao Matsuda; Kuniko Inoguchi

Kenji Kosaka (小坂 憲次, Kosaka Kenji; 12 March 1946 – 21 October 2016) was a Japanese politician.

== Biography ==
Kosaka was born in the city of Nagano in Nagano Prefecture, on 12 March 1946. His father is Zentaro Kosaka, also a politician. Kenji Kosaka received a law degree from Keio University in 1968.

He worked in London for Japan Airlines between 1968 and 1984. Returning to Japan, he became secretary to Prime Minister Yasuhiro Nakasone in 1986. He was appointed minister of education on 31 October 2005. In 2005, he was elected to the House of Representatives for the sixth time, representing Nagano Prefecture.

Kenji Kosaka is affiliated to the openly revisionist lobby Nippon Kaigi. He died on 21 October 2016 of cancer.

Political offices
Preceded by Nariaki Nakayama	Minister of Education, Culture, Sports, Science and Technology of Japan; 2005–2006	Succeeded by Bunmei Ibuki
