= Jirō Kawasaki =

Japanese politician

- 川崎 二郎
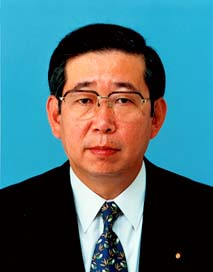
- Official portrait, 1998

Minister of Health, Labour and Welfare
- In office 31 October 2005 – 26 September 2006
- Prime Minister: Junichiro Koizumi
- Preceded by: Hidehisa Otsuji
- Succeeded by: Hakuo Yanagisawa

Director-General of the Hokkaido Development Agency
- In office 14 January 1999 – 5 October 1999
- Prime Minister: Keizō Obuchi
- Preceded by: Kichio Inoue
- Succeeded by: Toshihiro Nikai

Minister of Transport
- In office 30 July 1998 – 5 October 1999
- Prime Minister: Keizō Obuchi
- Preceded by: Takao Fujii
- Succeeded by: Toshihiro Nikai

Member of the House of Representatives; from Tōkai
- In office 8 July 1986 – 14 October 2021
- Preceded by: Hiroshi Nakai
- Succeeded by: Multi-member district
- Constituency: See list: Mie 1st (1986–1996); PR block (1996–2000); Mie 1st (2000–2009); PR block (2009–2012); Mie 1st (2012–2017); PR block (2017–2021)
- In office 22 June 1980 – 28 November 1983
- Preceded by: Chikara Sakaguchi
- Succeeded by: Chikara Sakaguchi
- Constituency: Mie 1st

Personal details
- Born: 15 November 1947 (age 78) Iga, Mie, Japan
- Party: Liberal Democratic
- Children: Hideto Kawasaki
- Education: Keio University

Third Realigned Koizumi Cabinet (2005-10-31)
- Secretary: Shinzō Abe
- Internal Affairs: Heizō Takenaka
- Justice: Seiken Sugiura
- Foreign Affairs: Taro Aso
- Finance: Sadakazu Tanigaki
- Education: Kenji Kosaka
- Health: Jirō Kawasaki
- Agriculture: Shoichi Nakagawa
- Economy: Toshihiro Nikai
- Land: Kazuo Kitagawa
- Environment: Yuriko Koike
- Defense: Fukushiro Nukaga
- Ministers of State: Tetsuo Kutsukake; Kaoru Yosano; Koki Chuma; Iwao Matsuda; Kuniko Inoguchi

Jirō Kawasaki (川崎 二郎, Kawasaki Jirō; born 15 November 1947) is a Japanese politician who served as Minister of Health, Labour and Welfare under Prime Minister Junichiro Koizumi.

Kawasaki was born in Iga, Mie. His father and grandfather were both politicians.

He attended Keio University and graduated with a degree in Commerce. After several years working at Matsushita, Kawasaki won a seat in the House of Representatives, representing Mie Prefecture in 1980.

Kawasaki is a long-time rival of Hiroshi Nakai of the Democratic Party of Japan, and the two have repeatedly challenged each other for seats representing Mie in the Diet.

He served as Minister of Transportation under Keizō Obuchi, and later as Director of the Hokkaido Development Agency. On 31 October 2005, Junichirō Koizumi chose Kawasaki to head the Ministry of Health, Labor and Welfare.

== Quotes ==
"We must regret having given him (Horie) too much credit." Asahi Shimbun 25 January 2006

"I do not think that Japan should ever become a multi-ethnic society." The New York Times, 22 April 2009.

Political offices
Preceded by Hidehisa Otsuji	Minister of Health, Labour and Welfare of Japan; 2005–2006	Succeeded by Hakuo Yanagisawa
Preceded by Kichio Inoue	Director General of the Hokkaido Development Agency; 1999	Succeeded by Toshihiro Nikai
Preceded by Takao Fujii	Minister of Transport; 1998–1999	Succeeded by Toshihiro Nikai
