= Kodomo Teate Law =

Child Allowance in Japan

The Kodomo Teate Law (子ども手当法, Kodomo Teate Hō) is a law introduced in Japan by the Democratic Party of Japan (DPJ) in April 2010. It grants 13,000 yen per month to parents with children up to the age of fifteen.

It was passed as a way to reduce the "Economic Burden" placed on families.

== Description ==
The law gives legal guardians of children under 15 years old, born before April 1 of that year, 26,000 yen (or $67 in USD) every month; although in 2010, its first fiscal year, it was 13,000 yen. There are similar child allowance systems in place already but with a means test to check eligibility for benefits.

The original law did not require that the children be residing domestically and this made the law open to abuse, such as the case of a Korean national in Amagasaki who attempted to apply for allowances for 554 children allegedly under his care but residing in Thailand — he was however turned away at the city hall. This loophole was closed in August 2011 with new legislation designed to address this specific issue.

== Revenue shortages ==
How the measure would be funded was not clearly specified, only that ¥2.288400 trillion would be allocated in the first year, and that it would double after that. The DPJ (Democratic Party of Japan) stated that rescinded exemptions for dependents and marital deductions would help make up the revenue shortfall. The tax revenue increase is ¥800 billion from the exemption for dependents, ¥600 billion from marital deductions, but it is still far less than the expense of Kodomo Teate. By rescinding the Kosodate ōen tokubetsu teate (子育て応援特別手当, support child-raising special benefit) in the second government, 100 billion yen was added to the budget.

The measure has been criticised by local governments. It has been suggested that the bankroll of Kodomo teate should be appropriated by slashing additional appropriation, compiled under Liberal Democratic Party rule, but these additional appropriation contain budgets for emergency economic, employment measures, and new anti-virus measures. Heizo Takenaka, former Minister of Public Management, said "It cuts a little waste, but creates a big waste".

At the suggestion of revenue shortages, six out of ten people think it needs income limitation, and chief secretary Ichiro Ozawa turned in remonstrations to the national government for income limitation. Naoto Kan, deputy prime minister, denied there would be any shortages, saying that the cost of undertaking the reform to the country's income should be higher than the expense of the sum total of income limitation.

After all the details of the proposal of income limitation were laid down, the Japan fiscal deficit remains a large percentage of GDP. An OECD spokesman said that the Japanese government should fight the country's falling birthrate by increasing child day-care provisions to enhance the employment rate, which is at a record low. Vice minister Naoto Kan, Minister of Public Management Kazuhiro Haradat, finance minister Yoshihisa Hujii, and Minister of Health, Labour and Welfare, Akira Nagatsuma, all agreed that the remaining burden to local authorities or business enterprises would total ¥508.09 billion 900 million yen, after the deduction of the state budget.

== Exemptions and deductions ==
For revenue, the DPJ said it would abolish the dependent deduction and deduction for spouses. In that case, by the Kodomo teate, a family with a child under the age of 14 would receive an annual remuneration of 5 million yen, and will make income go up by 230,900 yen.

A household with a public high school student over the age of 15 would enjoy the benefit of ‘‘Kōkō mushō-ka hōan’’ (高校無償化法案, the high school student financial aid bill), but that a: household with a child under the age of 15; an independent high school student; a full-time homemaker with no children; a student in college or graduate school; or an adult incapable of working due to elderly parents - all would suffer a great reduction.

The DJP Manifesto stated that the benefit would help a child until their junior high school graduation, but actual eligibility requirements do not relate to junior high, but rather fixed time periods.

== Institutionalized children ==
The Ministry of Health, Labour and Welfare (Japan) said in cases where children lived in homes for infants or orphan asylums, the parents would not be given the benefits. The number of these cases was estimated as 2400-5000. The head of such an institution said ‘‘they should rethink”. Within the DPJ there is the opinion that such cases do not fit with the idea of ‘‘Kodomo teate’’. (Note: Translation: 5,000 child allowance to children welfare facilities - Health, Labor and Welfare Minister Akira Nagatsuma in House of Representatives Budget Committee of the morning of May 8, in the child allowance of the current for about 5,000 children in the institutionalized welfare are no longer being paid, the idea of paid the same amount as the child allowance made it clear. Long pointed out that his wife "in the framework of the child allowance bill (in children admitted) are not paid" and. Said there is a fund called "Children's Fund peace of mind" "On top of that," We are considering measures to grant facilities from there. Child allowance, in the case of forced admission, have been excluded from the idea that the government is taking care of the child or parent was not there, such as nursing homes. But with the opinion to be paid as a "do not fit into society as a whole philosophy of raising all children, of child allowance" was up government, in the ruling party.)

== International cases ==
The Ministry also said that if foreigner parents living with their child in Japan were eligible to receive Kodomo teate, regardless of nationality. In case if the parents are living in Japan while their child is living abroad still the parents will receive Kodomo teate allowance based on certain conditions. In such a case the parents have to declare whether the child is their own or an adopted one. In addition to this, either of the parent must visit the child (who is staying overseas) at least twice a year and must remit money at least every 4 months to be eligible to receive Kodomo Teate.
