= Japan Publishing Industry Foundation for Culture =

Japanese nonprofit publishing foundation

- Native name: 一般財団法人出版文化産業振興財団
- Romanized name: Ippan zaidan hōjin Shuppan bunka sangyō shinkō zaidan
- Type: Nonprofit general incorporated foundation
- Industry: Publishing, Nonprofit
- Founded: March 27, 1991; 35 years ago
- Headquarters: Chiyoda, Tokyo, Japan
- Area served: Worldwide
- Products: Books, translations, magazines
- Number of employees: 50 (as of June 2021)
- Website: www.jpic.or.jp

Japan Publishing Industry Foundation for Culture, also known as JPIC, is a non-profit organization based in Chiyoda, Tokyo, and established in 1991.

== History ==
Japan Publishing Industry Foundation for Culture (JPIC) was founded on March 27, 1991 as a nonprofit corporation with authorization by the Minister of International Trade and Industry (present-day Minister of Economy, Trade and Industry). On April 1, 2012, JPIC became a general incorporated foundation.

== Activities ==
JPIC works to promote the culture of the publishing industry and encourage lifelong learning through reading through various programs and projects. The foundation researches and carries out surveys, cultivates human resources, collects and shares data, and plans promotional events and campaigns for relevant industries.

== Projects ==
=== Ongoing Projects ===
- JPIC Reading Advisor Training Course (1993–present)
- JPIC Yomikikase Supporter Course/Experience (1999–present)
- Ueno Park Children's Book Festival (2000–present)
- English translation series with the Japan Institute of International Affairs (2018–present)
- READ JAPAN PROJECT book donation assistance with Tokyo Foundation (2018–present)
- JPIC ONLINE (2020–present)
- Manga Essay Contest (2021-present)
- Tokyo International Rights Meeting (2023-present)
- Manga International Network Team (MINT) (2024-present)

=== Past Projects ===
- JAPAN LIBRARY nonfiction translation series (2014-2021)
- JPIC YOUTH (2018-2021)
- Kono hon yonde! quarterly magazine (2001–2026)
