= Nobuhiro Koyama =

Japanese politician (born 1975)

- 小山 展弘
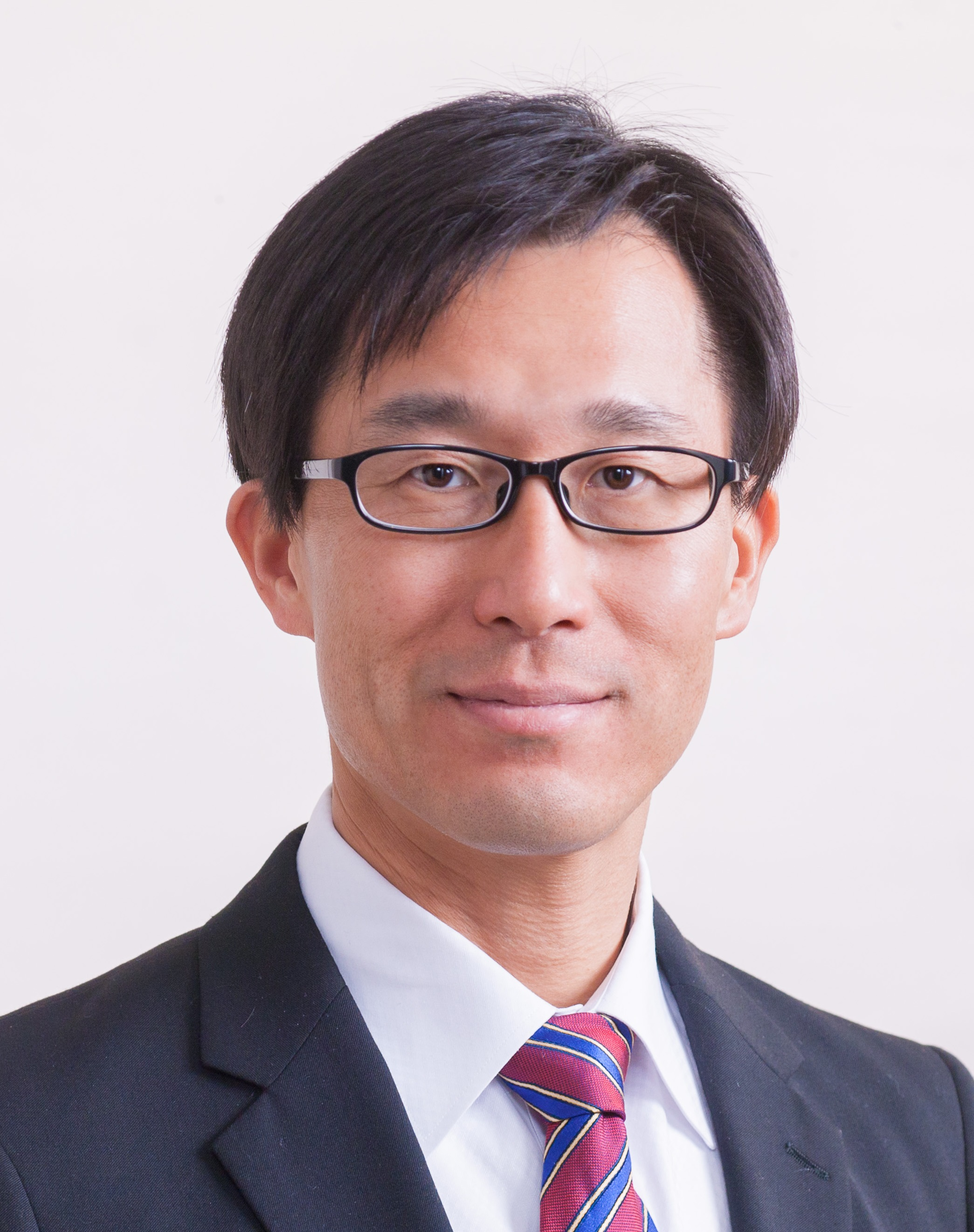
- Koyama in 2018

Member of the House of Representatives
- In office 2 November 2021 – 23 January 2026
- Preceded by: Hiroyuki Miyazawa
- Succeeded by: Yūzō Yamamoto
- Constituency: Shizuoka 3rd
- In office 19 December 2014 – 28 September 2017
- Constituency: Tōkai PR
- In office 1 September 2009 – 16 November 2012
- Preceded by: Hakuo Yanagisawa
- Succeeded by: Hiroyuki Miyazawa
- Constituency: Shizuoka 3rd

Personal details
- Born: 26 December 1975 (age 50) Ōsuka, Shizuoka, Japan
- Party: CRA (since 2026)
- Other political affiliations: DPJ (2009–2016); DP (2016–2018); DPP (2018–2020); CDP (2020–2026)
- Education: Waseda University

Nobuhiro Koyama (小山展弘, Koyama Nobuhiro; born 26 December 1975) is a Japanese politician. He served as a member of the House of Representatives from 2021 to 2026, having previously served from 2009 to 2012 and from 2014 to 2017. He previously worked at the Norinchukin Bank.
