= Wataru Ito =

Japanese politician

- 伊藤 渉
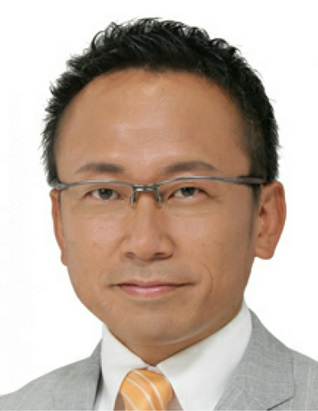
- Official portrait, 2020

Member of the House of Representatives
- In office 18 December 2012 – 9 October 2024
- Preceded by: Chikara Sakaguchi
- Succeeded by: Multi-member district
- Constituency: Tōkai PR
- In office 11 September 2005 – 21 July 2009
- Preceded by: Masatomo Kawai
- Succeeded by: Multi-member district
- Constituency: Tōkai PR

Personal details
- Born: 13 November 1969 (age 56) Minami, Nagoya, Japan
- Party: Komeito
- Education: Osaka University

Wataru Itō (伊藤 渉, Itō Wataru; born 13 November 1969) is a Japanese politician who served in the House of Representatives in the Diet as a member of the Komeito Party. A native of Nagoya, Aichi, he attended Osaka University as both an undergraduate and graduate student. Itō worked for JR Central from 1994 to 2005 and acquired a Shinkansen train operator license. He was elected to the House of Representatives for the first time in 2005.
