= Masayuki Naoshima =

Japanese politician

- 直嶋 正行
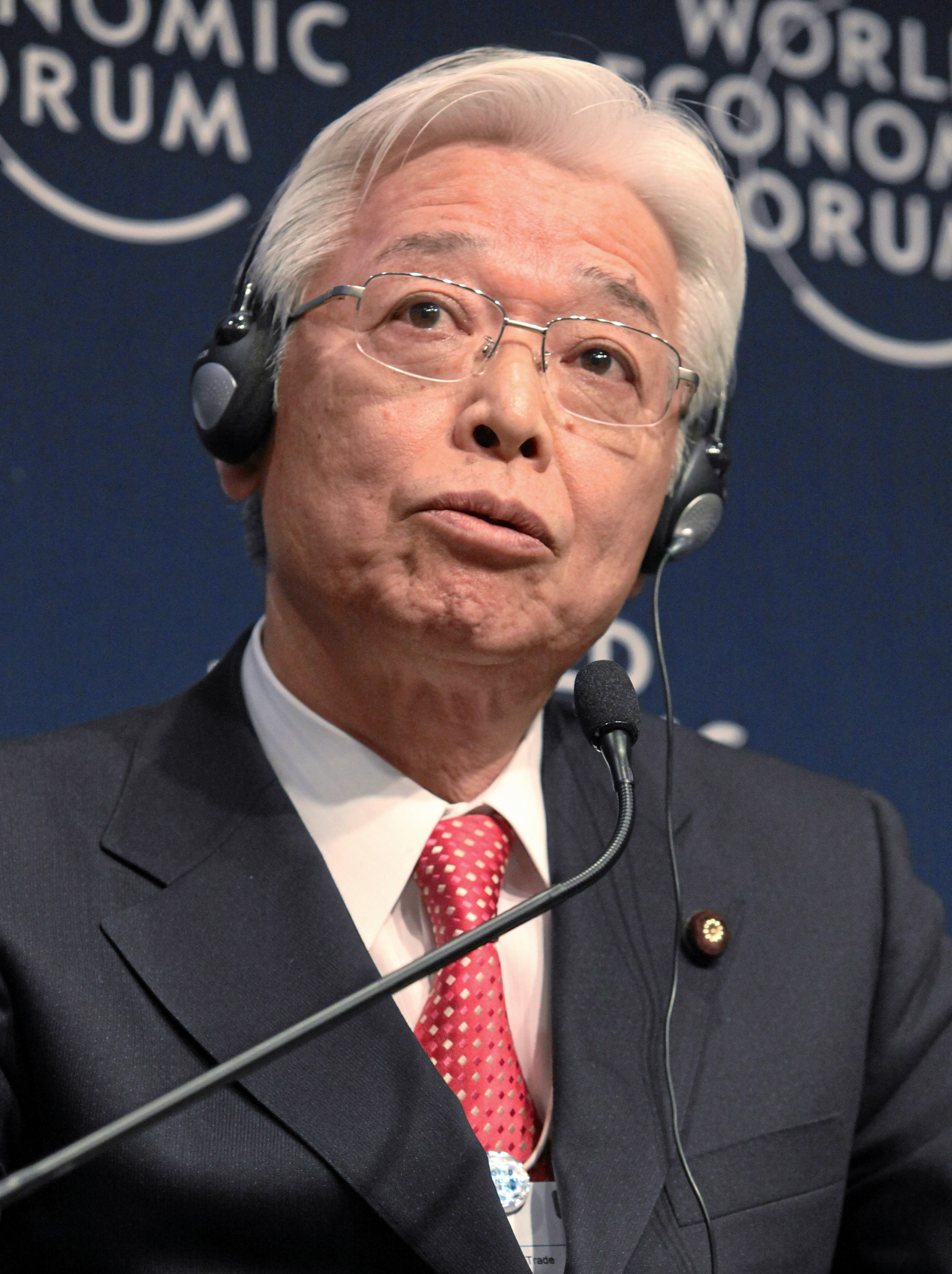
- Naoshima in 2010

Minister of Economy, Trade and Industry
- In office 16 September 2009 – 17 September 2010
- Prime Minister: Yukio Hatoyama; Naoto Kan
- Preceded by: Toshihiro Nikai
- Succeeded by: Akihiro Ohata

Member of the House of Councillors
- In office 26 July 1992 – 25 July 2016
- Constituency: National PR

Personal details
- Born: 23 October 1945 (age 80) Ikeda, Osaka, Japan
- Party: DPP (since 2018)
- Other political affiliations: DSP (1992–1994); New Frontier (1994–1998); New Fraternity (1998); DPJ (1998–2016); DP (2016–2018)
- Education: Kobe University

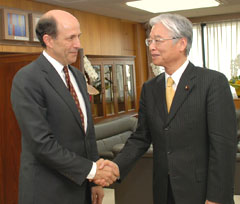
Masayuki Naoshima with the United States Ambassador to Japan John Roos October 21, 2009

Masayuki Naoshima (直嶋 正行, Naoshima Masayuki; born October 23, 1945) is a Japanese politician of the Democratic Party of Japan, a member of the House of Councillors in the Diet (national legislature). A native of Ikeda, Osaka and graduate of Kobe University, he was elected for the first time in 1992 and served until the 2016 Japanese House of Councillors election. Before becoming a politician, he worked for Toyota and its union for a long time.

Political offices
Preceded by Toshihiro Nikai	Minister of Economy, Trade and Industry of Japan; 2009–2010	Succeeded by Akihiro Ōhata
House of Councillors
Preceded by N/A	Councillor by proportional representation 1992–present	Incumbent
