= Chikara Sakaguchi =

Japanese politician (1934–2026)

- 坂口 力
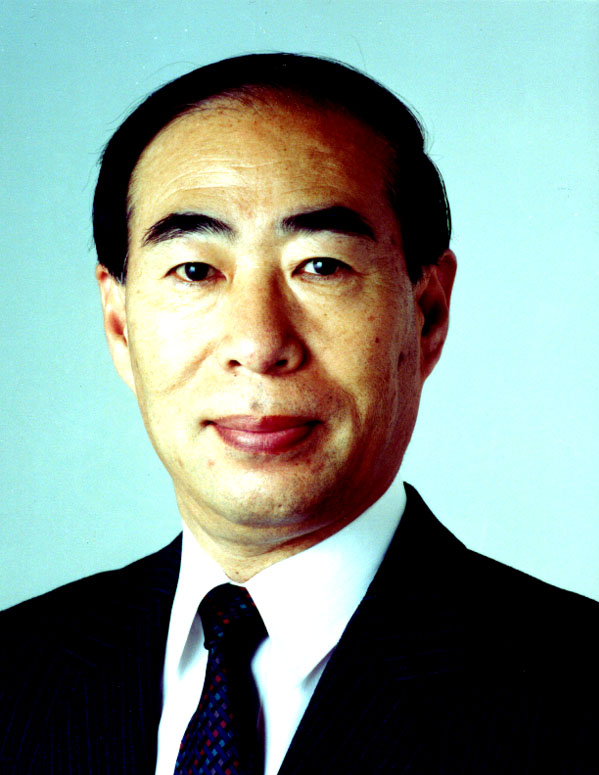
- Official portrait, 2000

Minister of Health, Labour and Welfare
- In office 6 January 2001 – 27 September 2004
- Prime Minister: Yoshirō Mori; Junichiro Koizumi
- Preceded by: Office established
- Succeeded by: Hidehisa Otsuji

Minister of Health and Welfare
- In office 5 December 2000 – 6 January 2001
- Prime Minister: Yoshirō Mori
- Preceded by: Yūji Tsushima
- Succeeded by: Office abolished

Minister of Labour
- In office 5 December 2000 – 6 January 2001
- Prime Minister: Yoshirō Mori
- Preceded by: Yoshio Yoshikawa
- Succeeded by: Office abolished
- In office 9 August 1993 – 28 April 1994
- Prime Minister: Morihiro Hosokawa
- Preceded by: Masakuni Murakami
- Succeeded by: Kunio Hatoyama

Member of the House of Representatives
- In office 19 July 1993 – 16 November 2012
- Preceded by: Chūji Itō
- Succeeded by: Wataru Ito
- Constituency: Mie 1st (1993–1996); Tōkai PR (1996–2012)
- In office 19 December 1983 – 24 January 1990
- Preceded by: Jirō Kawasaki
- Succeeded by: Hiroshi Nakai
- Constituency: Mie 1st
- In office 11 December 1972 – 19 May 1980
- Preceded by: Hideji Kawasaki
- Succeeded by: Jirō Kawasaki
- Constituency: Mie 1st

Personal details
- Born: 1 April 1934 Hakusan, Mie, Japan
- Died: 7 August 2026 (aged 92) Takamatsu, Japam
- Party: Komeito
- Other political affiliations: CGP (1972–1994); NFP (1994–1998)
- Education: Mie University

Chikara Sakaguchi (坂口 力, Sakaguchi Chikara; 1 April 1934 – 7 August 2026) was a Japanese politician who served in the House of Representatives between 1972 and 2012, and as Minister of Health, Labour and Welfare from 2001 to 2004.

== Early life ==
Chikara Sakaguchi was born in Mie Prefecture on 1 April 1934. He obtained an MD from Mie University. After qualifying as a physician, he worked at the Mie Red Cross Blood Center.

== Political career ==
Sakaguchi first ran for the House of Representatives as a member of Komeitō in the 1972 general election, and won a seat representing Mie Prefecture.

He was Minister of Labor in the 1993–94 coalition cabinet led by Morihiro Hosokawa. After the coalition government collapsed, he was the second-ranking officer of three other political parties, New Frontier Party (1994), Shintō Heiwa (1997), and New Komeito Party (1999).

=== Mori and Koizumi Cabinet positions ===
In December 2000, he was appointed Minister of Health and Welfare and Minister of Labor in the LDP-Liberal-Komeito coalition cabinet of Yoshirō Mori. The ministries merged in 2001, making Sakaguchi the first individual to hold the combined position of Minister of Health, Labour and Welfare. He retained this position under Junichiro Koizumi until September 2004.

As Health and Welfare Minister, Sakaguchi delivered an apology to Hansen's disease patients who were subjected to forced sterilization under the former Japanese eugenics protection law. He later advocated in the Diet for compensating the victims of these practices, and described them as "an egregious violation of human rights."

Following Japan's first BSE outbreak in 2001, Sakaguchi introduced testing of all slaughtered cattle in Japan, which continued through the last year of his tenure. He also dealt with record unemployment rates, and oversaw the implementation of reforms to the employment insurance and pension system. He was described by the Japan Institute for Labour Policy and Training as "one of the busiest of all the ministers" during this time.

== Retirement and death ==
Sakaguchi retired from the House of Representatives prior to the 2012 general election due to a party rule that forbade support for candidates over the age of 66. He thereafter became a special advisor to the New Komeito Party.

Sakaguchi died on 7 August 2026, at the age of 92.
