= Hiroshi Nakai =

Japanese politician

- 中井 洽
- Official portrait, 2009

Chairman of the National Public Safety Commission
- In office 16 September 2009 – 17 September 2010
- Prime Minister: Yukio Hatoyama; Naoto Kan
- Preceded by: Motoo Hayashi
- Succeeded by: Tomiko Okazaki

Minister for the Abduction Issue
- In office 16 September 2009 – 17 September 2010
- Prime Minister: Yukio Hatoyama; Naoto Kan
- Preceded by: Takeo Kawamura
- Succeeded by: Minoru Yanagida

Minister of Justice
- In office 8 May 1994 – 30 June 1994
- Prime Minister: Tsutomu Hata
- Preceded by: Nagano Shigeto
- Succeeded by: Isao Maeda

Member of the House of Representatives
- In office 19 February 1990 – 16 November 2012
- Preceded by: Chikara Sakaguchi
- Succeeded by: Jirō Kawasaki
- Constituency: Former Mie 1st (1990–1996); Mie 1st (1996–2000); Tōkai PR (2000–2009); Mie 1st (2009–2012)
- In office 10 December 1976 – 2 June 1986
- Preceded by: Sachio Yamamoto
- Succeeded by: Jirō Kawasaki
- Constituency: Former Mie 1st

Personal details
- Born: 10 June 1942 Hsinking, Manchukuo
- Died: 22 April 2017 (aged 74) Tokyo, Japan
- Party: Democratic (2003–2016)
- Other political affiliations: JSP (before 1972); Independent (1972–1975); DSP (1975–1994); NFP (1994–1998); LP (1998–2003); DP (2016–2017)
- Parent: Tokujirō Nakai (father)
- Education: Keio University

Hiroshi Nakai (中井 洽, Nakai Hiroshi; 10 June 1942 – 22 April 2017) was a Japanese politician serving in the House of Representatives in the Diet (national legislature) as a member of the Democratic Party of Japan. He was born in Jilin, China on 10 June 1942, then part of Manchukuo. A graduate of Keio University he was elected for the first time in 1976 after an unsuccessful run in 1972.

Nakai died on 22 April 2017 from stomach cancer at the age of 74.
