= Pasona =

Japanese multinational corporation

Pasona Inc.
- Native name: 株式会社パソナ
- Traded as: TYO: 2168
- Industry: Staffing services
- Founded: 1976
- Key people: Yasuyuki Nambu (Group CEO)
- Revenue: ¥243.3 billion (2019) (US$2.18 billion)
- Number of employees: 7,860

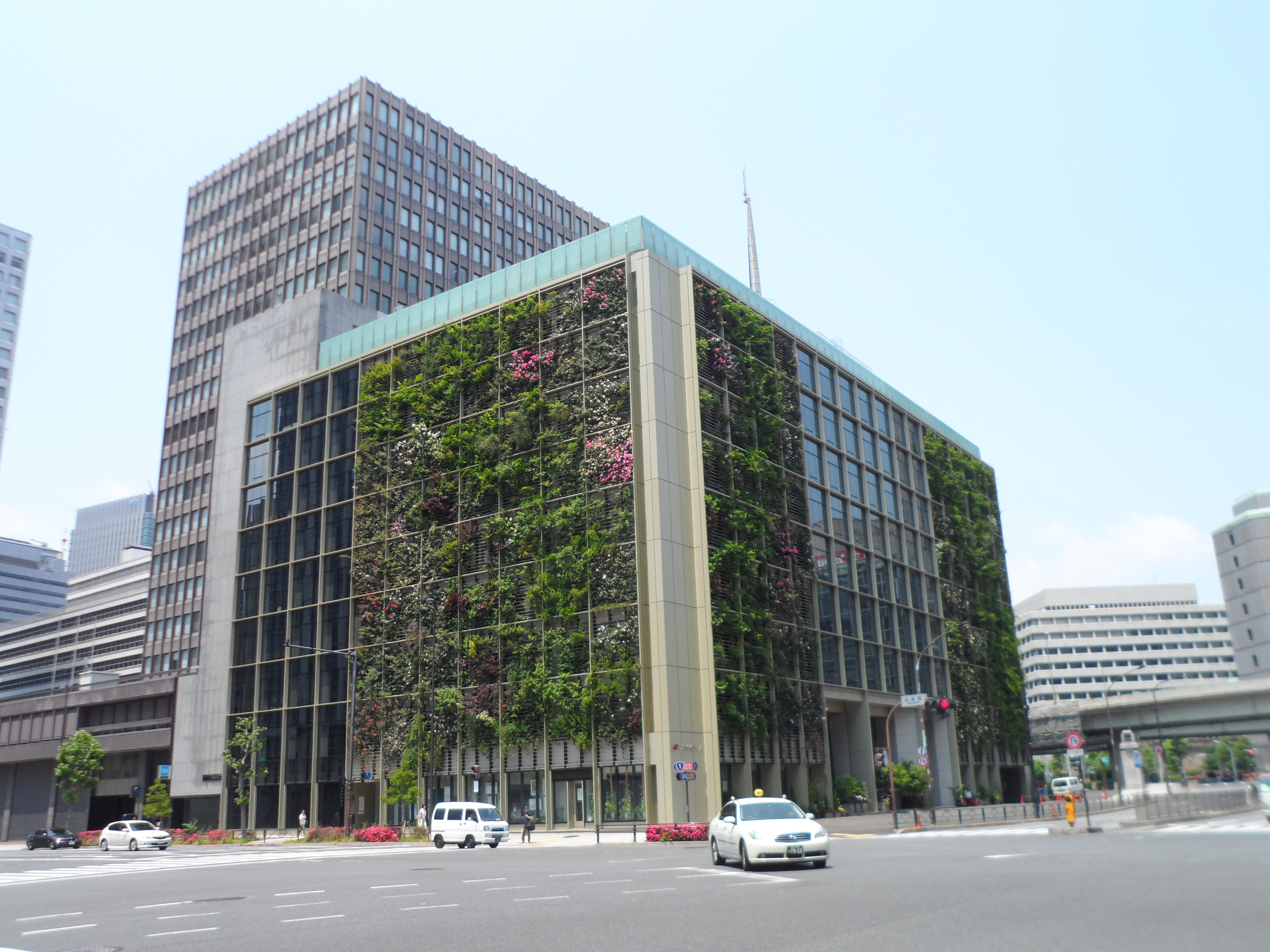
Pasona building in Tokyo, Japan

Pasona Inc. (株式会社パソナ Kabushiki Gaisha Pasona) is a Japanese multinational corporation that provides a variety of staffing services, including temporary staffing, recruiting, outplacement, and outsourcing. The company is headquartered in the Ōtemachi district of Tokyo and is the second largest staffing company in Japan.

== History ==
In February 1976, Yasuyuki Nambu founded Temporary Center, Inc. in the Kita ward of Osaka. Later that year, the company set up an office in the Chūō ward of Tokyo. Over the next 10 years, Temporary Center franchises were created in Okayama, Kyoto, Kumamoto, Niigata, and Nagasaki.

In 1993, the company changed its name to Pasona Inc. In 1999, Pasona Inc. and its related company, Pasona Sunrise Inc. moved their headquarters to Tokyo. The following year, Pasona Sunrise Inc. obtained operational rights to Pasona Inc. and changed its name to Pasona Inc.; the former Pasona Inc. changed its name to Nambu Enterprise Inc. At the end of December 2001, Pasona Inc. was listed on the Nasdaq Japan stock index. The stock has since been listed on the Hercules stock exchange.

From the early 1990s, Pasona Inc. began acquiring subsidiary companies that provide specialized staffing services in various fields. For example, Pasona Tech, Inc. provides staffing services in the IT field, and Pasona Foster Inc. provides staffing services in the nursing field. Pasona also has overseas divisions in Canada, China, Hong Kong, India, Singapore, Taiwan, Thailand, the United Kingdom, and the United States.

In 2007, Pasona Group Inc. was formed as a holding company for Pasona related companies.
