= Daizō Nozawa =

Japanese politician (1933–2024)

- 野沢 太三
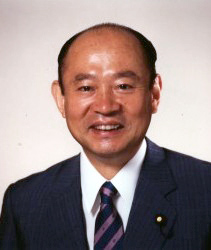
- Official portrait, 2003

Minister of Justice
- In office 22 September 2003 – 27 September 2004
- Prime Minister: Junichirō Koizumi
- Preceded by: Mayumi Moriyama
- Succeeded by: Chieko Nōno

Member of the House of Councillors
- In office 15 July 1986 – 25 July 2004
- Preceded by: Constituency established
- Succeeded by: Multi-member district
- Constituency: National PR

Personal details
- Born: 6 May 1933 Tatsuno, Nagano, Japan
- Died: 12 December 2024 (aged 91) Arakawa, Tokyo, Japan
- Party: Liberal Democratic
- Children: 3
- Education: University of Tokyo

Daizō Nozawa (野沢 太三, Nozawa Daizō; 6 May 1933 – 12 December 2024) was a Japanese politician who served as the Justice Minister of Japan from 2003 to 2004.

Nozawa was born in Tatsuno, Nagano. He graduated from the University of Tokyo with a bachelor of civil engineering degree and joined Japanese National Railways in 1956. During his career at JNR, he obtained the degree of Ph.D. He was first elected as a member of the House of Councillors in 1986. He served as a member of the house until 2004 when he did not run for reelection.

He led the leader of the Japan-Korea Tunnel Research Institute, an organization trying to create a tunnel link between Japan and South Korea.

He died on 12 December 2024, at the age of 91.

Political offices
Preceded by Mayumi Moriyama	Minister of Justice of Japan; 2003–2004	Succeeded by Chieko Nōno
