= Mayumi Moriyama =

Japanese politician (1927–2021)

- 森山 眞弓
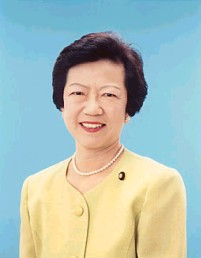
- Official portrait, 2001

Minister of Justice
- In office 26 April 2001 – 22 September 2003
- Prime Minister: Junichiro Koizumi
- Preceded by: Masahiko Kōmura
- Succeeded by: Daizō Nozawa

Minister of Education
- In office 12 December 1992 – 9 August 1993
- Prime Minister: Kiichi Miyazawa
- Preceded by: Kunio Hatoyama
- Succeeded by: Ryōko Akamatsu

Chief Cabinet Secretary
- In office 25 August 1989 – 28 September 1990
- Prime Minister: Toshiki Kaifu
- Preceded by: Tokuo Yamashita
- Succeeded by: Misoji Sakamoto

Director-General of the Environmental Agency
- In office 10 August 1989 – 25 August 1989
- Prime Minister: Toshiki Kaifu
- Preceded by: Tatsuo Yamazaki
- Succeeded by: Setsu Shiga

Member of the House of Representatives; from Northern Kanto
- In office 21 October 1996 – 21 July 2009
- Preceded by: Constituency established
- Succeeded by: Akio Fukuda
- Constituency: PR block (1996–2003); Tochigi 2nd (2003–2009)

Member of the House of Councillors
- In office 8 July 1980 – 20 September 1996
- Preceded by: Takashi Ōtsuka
- Succeeded by: Itten Kamiyoshihara
- Constituency: Tochigi at-large

Personal details
- Born: 7 November 1927 Tokyo, Japan
- Died: 14 October 2021 (aged 93) Tokyo, Japan
- Party: Liberal Democratic
- Education: Tsuda College; University of Tokyo

Mayumi Moriyama (森山 眞弓, Moriyama Mayumi; 7 November 1927 – 14 October 2021) was a Japanese politician of the Liberal Democratic Party, a member of the House of Representatives in the Diet (national legislature).

== Early life and education ==
Moriyama was born in Tokyo on 7 November 1927. Her father was a businessman, who was progressive and liberal. Her mother was a conservative type of a housewife.

In 1947, she graduated from the department of foreign languages at Tsuda College. She later received a bachelor's degree in law from the University of Tokyo in 1950.

== Career ==
Moriyama worked at the Ministry of Labor from 1950 to 1980. She was elected to the first of her three terms in the House of Councillors in 1980 and then to the House of Representatives for the first time in 1996. She headed the environment agency until 26 August 1989 when she was appointed chief cabinet secretary in the cabinet of Toshiki Kaifu. Moriyama replaced Tokuo Yamashita and became the first Japanese woman appointed to this post. She was dismissed after six months of tenure on 6 January 1990. Misoji Sakamoto succeeded her as chief cabinet secretary.

She was appointed Minister of Education to the cabinet of Prime Minister Kiichi Miyazawa on 12 November 1992. She was also Japan's first female education minister. She remained in office until 1993. She also served as Minister of Justice from 26 April 2001 to 19 November 2003 in the first cabinet of Prime Minister Junichiro Koizumi.

Moriyama became principal of Hakuoh University in 2007, and remained in that post until 2013.

== Personal life ==
Moriyama is the widow of representative Kinji Moriyama. In 1991, she published a book, titled What I Saw in the Cabinet.

== Death ==
Moriyama died in Tokyo at the age of 93 on 14 October 2021.

Political offices
| Preceded by Tatsuo Yamazaki | Head of the Environmental Agency; 1989 | Succeeded by Setsu Shiga |
| Preceded by Tokuo Yamashita | Chief Cabinet Secretary; 1989–1990 | Succeeded by Misoji Sakamoto |
| Preceded by Kunio Hatoyama | Minister of Education; 1992–1993 | Succeeded by Ryōko Akamatsu |
| Preceded by Masahiko Kōmura | Minister of Justice; 2001–2003 | Succeeded by Daizō Nozawa |
House of Councillors
| Preceded by Hiroshi Miyazawa | Chair, Foreign Affairs Committee of the House of Councillors of Japan; 1987–1988 | Succeeded by Masao Horie |
Academic offices
| Preceded by Chūmaru Koyama | Principal of Hakuoh University; 2007–2013 | Succeeded by Takayasu Okushima |
