= Mie 1st district =

Legislative district of Japan

- Parliamentary constituency for the Japanese House of Representatives
- Numbered map of Mie Prefecture single-member districts
- Prefecture: Mie
- Proportional District: Tōkai
- Electorate: 355,124

Current constituency
- Created: 1994
- Seats: One
- Party: Liberal Democratic
- Representative: Norihisa Tamura
- Municipalities: Tsu and Matsusaka

Mie 1st district (三重県第1区, Mie-ken dai-ikku or simply 三重1区, Mie-ikku ) is a single-member constituency of the House of Representatives in the national Diet of Japan located in Mie Prefecture.

== Areas covered ==
=== Since 2017 ===
- Tsu
- Matsusaka

=== 2013–2017 ===
- Part of Tsu
- Iga
- Nabari

=== 1994–2013 ===
- Tsu
- Nabari
- Ueno
- Age District
- Ayama District
- Naga District

== List of representatives ==
| Election | Representative | Party | Notes |
|---|---|---|---|
| 1996 | Hiroshi Nakai | New Frontier | |
| 1996 | Hiroshi Nakai | Liberal | |
| 2000 | Jirō Kawasaki | Liberal Democratic | |
| 2003 | Jirō Kawasaki | Liberal Democratic | |
| 2005 | Jirō Kawasaki | Liberal Democratic | |
| 2009 | Hiroshi Nakai | Democratic | |
| 2012 | Jirō Kawasaki | Liberal Democratic | |
| 2014 | Jirō Kawasaki | Liberal Democratic | |
| 2017 | Norihisa Tamura | Liberal Democratic | |
| 2021 | Norihisa Tamura | Liberal Democratic | |
| 2024 | Norihisa Tamura | Liberal Democratic | |
| 2026 | Norihisa Tamura | Liberal Democratic | |

== Election results ==
2026
| Party | Candidate | Votes | % | ±% |
|---|---|---|---|---|
| LDP | Norihisa Tamura (Endorsed by Ishin) | 124,762 | 66.28 | ▲8.71 |
| Centrist Reform | Wakako Fukumori | 53,020 | 28.17 | ▼5.85 |
| JCP | Yōsuke Deguchi | 10,465 | 5.56 | ▼2.86 |
| Registered electors | | 346,871 | | |
| Turnout | | 188,247 | 55.55 | ▲0.66 |
| LDP hold | | | | |

2024
| Party | Candidate | Votes | % | ±% |
|---|---|---|---|---|
| LDP | Norihisa Tamura | 107,926 | 57.6 | ▼5.5 |
| CDP | Wakako Fukumori (elected in Tōkai PR block) | 63.770 | 34.0 | ▲0.9 |
| JCP | Yōsuke Deguchi | 15,776 | 8.4 | |
| Registered electors | | 350,733 | | |
| Turnout | | | 54.89 | ▲0.01 |
| LDP hold | | | | |

2021
| Party | Candidate | Votes | % | ±% |
|---|---|---|---|---|
| Liberal Democratic (endorsed by Komeito) | Norihisa Tamura (incumbent) | 122,772 | 63.09 | |
| CDP (endorsed by SDP, DPP) | Naohisa Matsuda | 64,507 | 33.15 | New |
| Anti-NHK | Izumi Yamada | 7,329 | 3.77 | New |
| Majority | | 58,265 | 29.94 | |
| Registered electors | | 359,419 | | |
| Turnout | | | 54.88 | ▼1.77 |
| LDP hold | | | | |

2017
| Party | Candidate | Votes | % | ±% |
|---|---|---|---|---|
| Liberal Democratic (endorsed by Komeito) | Norihisa Tamura (Mie 4th incumbent) | 109,584 | 53.82 | |
| Independent | Naohisa Matsuda (PR seat incumbent) | 94,045 | 46.18 | New |
| Majority | | 15,539 | 7.64 | |
| Registered electors | | 366,960 | | |
| Turnout | | | 56.65 | ▲0.48 |
| LDP hold | | | | |

2014
| Party | Candidate | Votes | % | ±% |
|---|---|---|---|---|
| Liberal Democratic (endorsed by Komeito) | Jirō Kawasaki (incumbent) | 88,219 | 52.98 | |
| Innovation | Naohisa Matsuda (won PR seat) | 56,504 | 33.93 | New |
| Communist | Masako Hashimoto | 21,785 | 13.08 | |
| Majority | | 31,715 | 19.05 | |
| Registered electors | | 304,954 | | |
| Turnout | | | 56.17 | ▼6.47 |
| LDP hold | | | | |

2012
| Party | Candidate | Votes | % | ±% |
|---|---|---|---|---|
| Liberal Democratic (endorsed by Komeito) | Jirō Kawasaki (PR seat incumbent) | 88,989 | 47.32 | |
| Restoration | Naohisa Matsuda | 54,970 | 29.23 | New |
| Democratic | Chiaki Hashimoto | 29,041 | 15.44 | |
| Communist | Emi Okano | 15,059 | 8.01 | N/A |
| Majority | | 34,019 | 18.09 | |
| Registered electors | | 307,509 | | |
| Turnout | | | 62.64 | ▼10.31 |
| LDP gain from Democratic | | | | |

2009
| Party | Candidate | Votes | % | ±% |
|---|---|---|---|---|
| Democratic | Hiroshi Nakai (PR seat incumbent) | 118,413 | 53.55 | |
| Liberal Democratic | Jirō Kawasaki (incumbent) (won PR seat) | 98,380 | 44.49 | |
| Happiness Realization | Hitoshi Ushirotani | 4,340 | 1.96 | New |
| Majority | | 20,033 | 9.06 | |
| Registered electors | | 310,063 | | |
| Turnout | | | 72.95 | ▲0.36 |
| Democratic gain from LDP | | | | |

2005
| Party | Candidate | Votes | % | ±% |
|---|---|---|---|---|
| Liberal Democratic | Jirō Kawasaki (incumbent) | 112,023 | 50.50 | |
| Democratic | Hiroshi Nakai (PR seat incumbent) (won PR seat) | 95,560 | 43.08 | |
| Communist | Emi Okano | 14,236 | 6.42 | |
| Majority | | 16,463 | 7.42 | |
| Registered electors | | 310,151 | | |
| Turnout | | | 72.59 | ▲5.18 |
| LDP hold | | | | |

2003
| Party | Candidate | Votes | % | ±% |
|---|---|---|---|---|
| Liberal Democratic | Jirō Kawasaki (incumbent) | 101,911 | 50.09 | |
| Democratic | Hiroshi Nakai (PR seat incumbent) (won PR seat) | 90,381 | 44.42 | New |
| Communist | Takashi Ōtake | 11,157 | 5.48 | |
| Majority | | 11,530 | 5.67 | |
| Registered electors | | 308,441 | | |
| Turnout | | | 67.41 | ▼2.36 |
| LDP hold | | | | |

2000
| Party | Candidate | Votes | % | ±% |
|---|---|---|---|---|
| Liberal Democratic | Jirō Kawasaki (PR seat incumbent) | 104,484 | 50.87 | |
| Liberal | Hiroshi Nakai (incumbent) (won PR seat) | 76,673 | 37.33 | New |
| Communist | Takuichi Komada | 21,158 | 10.30 | |
| Liberal League | Kenji Hayashi | 3,097 | 1.51 | New |
| Majority | | 27,811 | 13.54 | |
| Registered electors | | 304,467 | | |
| Turnout | | | 69.77 | ▲1.28 |
| LDP gain from Liberal | | | | |

1996
| Party | Candidate | Votes | % | ±% |
|---|---|---|---|---|
| New Frontier | Hiroshi Nakai | 89,802 | 45.21 | New |
| Liberal Democratic | Jirō Kawasaki (won PR seat) | 89,359 | 44.98 | New |
| Communist | Shinichi Fujii | 19,483 | 9.81 | New |
| Majority | | 443 | 0.23 | |
| Registered electors | | 295,948 | | |
| Turnout | | | 68.49 | |
| New Frontier win (new seat) | | | | |
