= Kiichi Inoue =

Japanese politician (1932–2010)

- 井上 喜一
- Official portrait, 2003

Member of the House of Representatives
- In office 6 July 1986 – 21 July 2009
- Preceded by: Susumu Shiota
- Succeeded by: Shōichi Takahashi
- Constituency: Hyōgo 3rd (1986–1996); Hyōgo 4th (1996–2009)

Personal details
- Born: 24 May 1932 Kasai, Hyōgo, Japan
- Died: 16 December 2010 (aged 78) Kasai, Hyōgo, Japan
- Party: Liberal Democratic (1986–1993; 2003–2010)
- Other political affiliations: JRP (1993–1994); NFP (1994–1998); LP (1998–2000); NCP (2000–2003)
- Education: University of Tokyo

Kiichi Inoue (井上 喜一, Inoue Kiichi; 24 May 1932 – 16 December 2010) was a Japanese politician of the Liberal Democratic Party, who served as a member of the House of Representatives in the Diet (national legislature). A native of Kasai, Hyōgo and graduate of the University of Tokyo, he joined the Ministry of Agriculture, Forestry and Fisheries in 1955. He was elected to the House of Representatives for Hyōgo 3rd district for the first time in 1986. He later represented the Hyōgo 4th district, and served as a House member until his defeat in 2009.

== Controversy ==
Following the Sasebo slashing in 2004, where a 11-year old girl murdered a 12-year old girl, Inoue referred to Girl A, the murderer, as genki (vigorous, lively), a word with positive connotations. He also remarked that "Men have committed thoughtless, harsh acts but I think this is the first for a girl. Recently the difference between men and women is shrinking." These comments drew criticism from women's groups.

== Death ==
On 16 December 2010, Inoue died of pneumonia at the age of 78.
