= Hakuo Yanagisawa =

Japanese politician

- 柳澤 伯夫
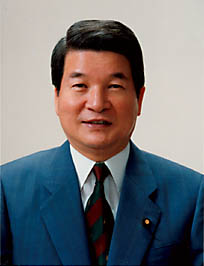
- Official portrait, 2001

Minister of Health, Labour and Welfare
- In office 26 September 2006 – 27 August 2007
- Prime Minister: Shinzo Abe
- Preceded by: Jirō Kawasaki
- Succeeded by: Yōichi Masuzoe

Minister of State for Financial Services
- In office 6 January 2001 – 30 September 2002
- Prime Minister: Yoshirō Mori
- Preceded by: Office established
- Succeeded by: Heizō Takenaka

Chairman of the Financial Reconstruction Commission
- In office 5 December 2000 – 6 January 2001
- Prime Minister: Yoshirō Mori
- Preceded by: Hideyuki Aizawa
- Succeeded by: Office abolished
- In office 15 December 1998 – 5 October 1999
- Prime Minister: Keizō Obuchi
- Preceded by: Office Established
- Succeeded by: Michio Ochi

Minister of State (with responsibility for Financial Reconstruction)
- In office 23 October 1998 – 15 December 1998
- Prime Minister: Keizō Obuchi
- Preceded by: Office established
- Succeeded by: Office abolished

Director-General of the National Land Agency
- In office 30 July 1998 – 23 October 1998
- Prime Minister: Keizō Obuchi
- Preceded by: Hisaoki Kamei
- Succeeded by: Kichio Inoue

Member of the House of Representatives
- In office 6 July 1986 – 21 July 2009
- Preceded by: Tokurō Adachi
- Succeeded by: Nobuhiro Koyama
- Constituency: Former Shizuoka 3rd (1986–1996); Shizuoka 3rd (1996–2009)
- In office 23 June 1980 – 28 November 1983
- Preceded by: Masao Saitō
- Succeeded by: Hiroshi Kumagai
- Constituency: Former Shizuoka 3rd

Personal details
- Born: 18 August 1935 (age 91) Fukuroi, Shizuoka, Japan
- Party: Liberal Democratic
- Education: University of Tokyo

Hakuo Yanagisawa (Japanese: 柳沢 伯夫, Hepburn: Yanagisawa Hakuo; 18 August 1935) is a member of the Liberal Democratic Party. He was the Minister of Health, Labour and Welfare in Japan (2006–2007), and was a member of the House of Representatives from 1980 to 2009. His constituency was Shizuoka Prefecture 3rd District.

In January 2007, he drew criticism for describing women as "birth-giving machines" and "baby making devices" in a speech on the falling birthrate of Japan. He said later "it was extremely sound to have more than two children".

== Career ==
He is from the city of Fukuroi in Shizuoka Prefecture. He graduated from the Faculty of Law at the University of Tokyo in 1961. In 1980 he was elected to the House of Representatives for the first time, and has been elected eight times since. He was the Parliamentary Secretary for Foreign Affairs from July 1994 until August 1995, and the Chairman of the Committee on Health and Welfare from March 1998 to July 1998.

In July 1998 he was appointed to be the Minister of State for the National Land Agency by Prime Minister Keizō Obuchi, and became the Minister of State for Financial Reconstruction in October of that year. He was the Minister of State and Chairman of the Financial Reconstruction Commission from December 1998 to October 1999. He then reprised that role from December 2000 to January 2001. He was the Minister of State for Financial Services from January 2001 to September 2002, when he stepped down due to a disagreement with the minister in charge of economic and fiscal policy, Heizō Takenaka. He was the Chairman of the Research Commission on the Tax System for the LDP from November 2005 to September 2006. He became the Minister of Health, Labour and Welfare in September 2006. He was a member of the Liberal Democratic Party, belonging specifically to the Kōchikai (Koga faction).

In August 2009, Yanagisawa ran for reelection to represent Shizuoka's 3rd district House of Representatives, but was defeated by Nobuhiro Koyama. Yanagisawa thereafter retired from politics and accepted a post as the president of Josai International University.

House of Representatives (Japan)
Preceded by Bunmei Ibuki	Chair, Education Committee of House of Representatives of Japan; 1995–1996	Succeeded by Koji Futada
Preceded by Kazuyoshi Kaneko	Chair, Health and Welfare Committee of House of Representatives of Japan; 1998	Succeeded by Yoshio Kimura
Political offices
Preceded by Hisaoki Kamei	Head of the National Land Agency; 1998	Succeeded by Kichio Inoue
New office	Minister of State (with responsibility for Financial Reconstruction); 1998	Succeeded by Himself as Chairman of the Financial Reconstruction Commission
Preceded by Himself as Minister of State (with responsibility for Financial Reconstruction)	Chairman of the Financial Reconstruction Commission; 1998–1999	Succeeded by Michio Ochi
Preceded by Hideyuki Aizawa	Chairman of the Financial Reconstruction Commission; 2000–2001	Succeeded by Himself as Minister of State for Financial Services
Preceded by Himself as Chairman of the Financial Reconstruction Commission	Minister of State for Financial Services; 2001–2002	Succeeded by Heizō Takenaka
Preceded by Jirō Kawasaki	Minister of Health, Labour and Welfare of Japan; 2006–2007	Succeeded by Yōichi Masuzoe
Party political offices
Preceded by Yūji Tsushima	Chairman of the Tax Research Council of the Liberal Democratic Party; 2005–2006	Succeeded by Kaoru Yosano
