= Toshihiro Nikai =

Japanese politician (born 1939)

- 二階 俊博
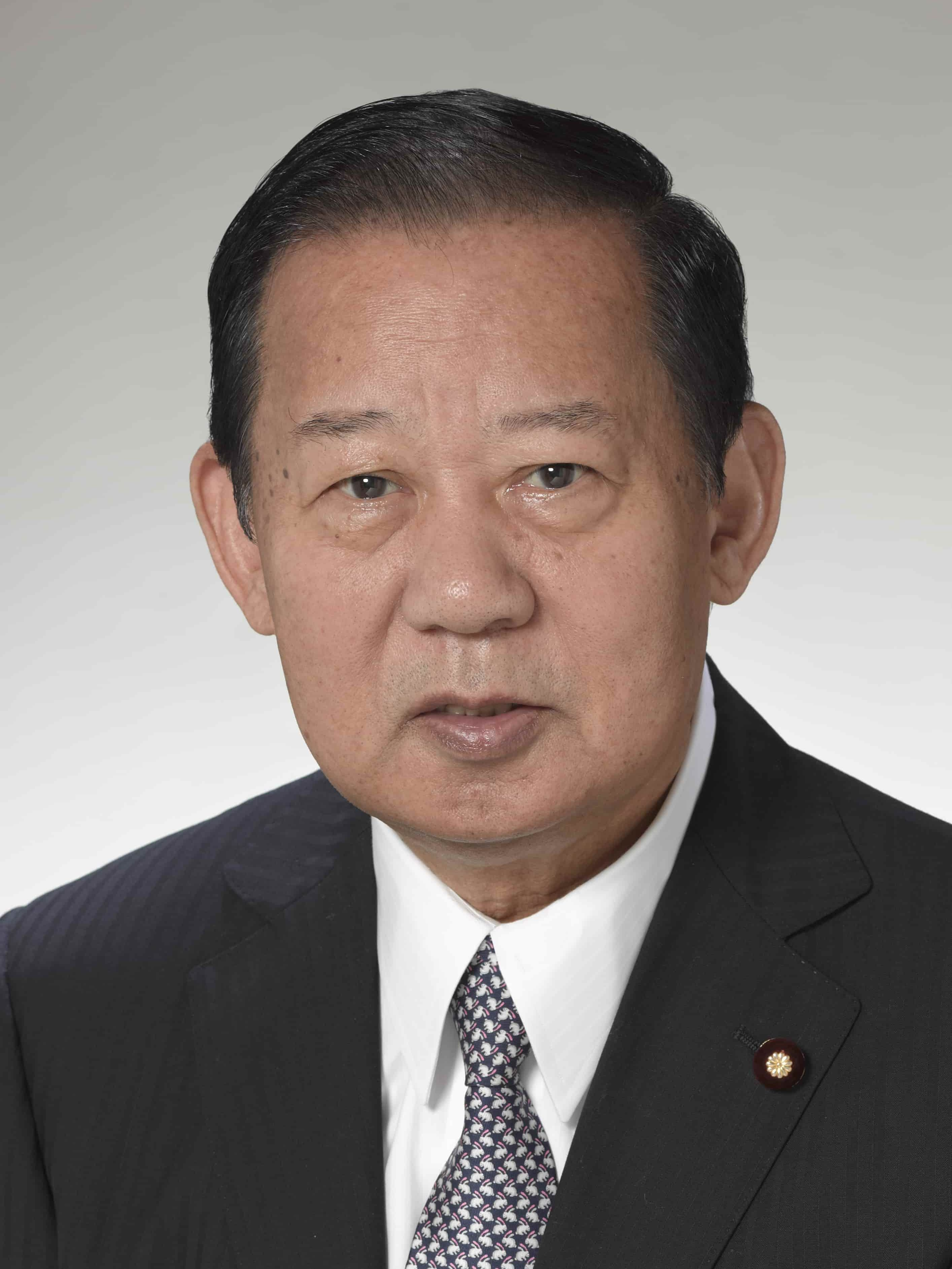
- Official portrait, 2014

Secretary-General of the Liberal Democratic Party
- In office 4 August 2016 – 1 October 2021
- President: Shinzo Abe; Yoshihide Suga
- Vice President: Masahiko Kōmura (2016–2018)
- Preceded by: Sadakazu Tanigaki
- Succeeded by: Akira Amari
Ministerial offices
Minister of Economy, Trade and Industry
In office 2 August 2008 – 16 September 2009
Prime Minister	Yasuo Fukuda; Tarō Asō
Preceded by	Akira Amari
Succeeded by	Masayuki Naoshima
In office 31 October 2005 – 26 September 2006
Prime Minister	Junichiro Koizumi
Preceded by	Shōichi Nakagawa
Succeeded by	Akira Amari
Minister of Transport
In office 5 October 1999 – 4 July 2000
Prime Minister	Keizō Obuchi
Preceded by	Jirō Kawasaki
Succeeded by	Hajime Morita
Director-General of the Hokkaido Development Agency
In office 5 October 1999 – 4 July 2000
Prime Minister	Keizō Obuchi
Preceded by	Jirō Kawasaki
Succeeded by	Hajime Morita

Member of the House of Representatives
- In office 18 December 1983 – 9 October 2024
- Preceded by: Takashi Hayakawa
- Succeeded by: Constituency abolished
- Constituency: Wakayama 2nd (1983–1996); Wakayama 3rd (1996–2024)

Member of the Wakayama Prefectural Assembly
- In office 30 April 1975 – 29 April 1983
- Constituency: Gobō City

Personal details
- Born: 17 February 1939 (age 87) Gobō, Wakayama, Japan
- Party: Liberal Democratic (Shisuikai)
- Education: Chuo University

Toshihiro Nikai (二階 俊博, Nikai Toshihiro; born 17 February 1939) is a former Japanese politician for the Liberal Democratic Party (LDP) and the leader of the LDP Shisuikai faction (informally called the Nikai faction), who served as the Secretary-General of the LDP from 2016 to 2021. He was previously the Minister of Economy, Trade and Industry. Nikai is currently retired, after thirteen terms in the Lower House representing Wakayama's Third District. He is widely considered to be "Japan's most pro-China lawmaker". He has also been criticized for misogynistic views expressed in the past, and caused controversy when he invited women to "look, but not talk" at key party meetings.

On 31 October 2021, he was elected for the thirteenth time in Japan's 49th general election to the House of Representatives. At the age of 82 years and 8 months, he was the oldest winner in the election.

Also Nikai is Director of the Liberal Democratic Party's 2025 Osaka-Kansai Expo Promotion Headquarters, President of the National Travel Industry Association, and President of the Japan–China Friendship Parliamentarians' Union.

== Early life ==
Nikai was born in Gobō, Wakayama Prefecture. His father was an assemblyman in the Wakayama Prefectural Assembly who had little time for his son; his mother Kikue was the daughter of a physician and, unusual for that time for a woman in Japan, was a physician herself. He initially attended Inahara Elementary School, but at the end of WWII, he transferred to Gobō Elementary School. While attending Gobō Middle School, he participated in an extracurricular debating society, where he addressed the human rights issues facing the Burakumin, citing The Broken Commandment, a novel by Tōson Shimazaki. After graduation from Wakayama Prefectural Hidaka High School, Nikai attended Chuo University in Tokyo, graduating with a law degree in 1961. He immediately entered politics, working as secretary for Saburo Endo, a Diet member from Shizuoka who was serving as the Minister of Construction.

== First election successes ==
After Endo's death, Nikai returned to Wakayama, where he won a seat on the Wakayama Prefectural Assembly in 1975. He was elected to the House of Representatives in 1983. He was a member of Noboru Takeshita's faction within the Liberal Democratic Party, but left the party in 1993 to join the Japan Renewal Party (Shinseitō). As a member of the JRP, he served as Vice-Minister of Transportation under Morihiro Hosokawa in 1990.

== Party membership ==
He was later a member of the Liberal Party, Conservative Party, and New Conservative Party, independent parties in coalition with the LDP. As Secretary-General of the NCP and part of the governing coalition, he served as Minister of Transportation under Keizō Obuchi and Yoshirō Mori. After the NCP merged with the LDP in 2003, Nikai became an LDP member again, and was appointed Director of the General Affairs Bureau in 2004.

== Member of Koizumi Cabinet ==
In 2005, Prime Minister Junichiro Koizumi tapped Nikai to head the Diet committee in charge of the privatization of Japan Post. Following the general elections of that year, on 31 October, Koizumi selected Nikai to head the Ministry of Economy, Trade and Industry, traditionally one of the most highly valued cabinet portfolios.

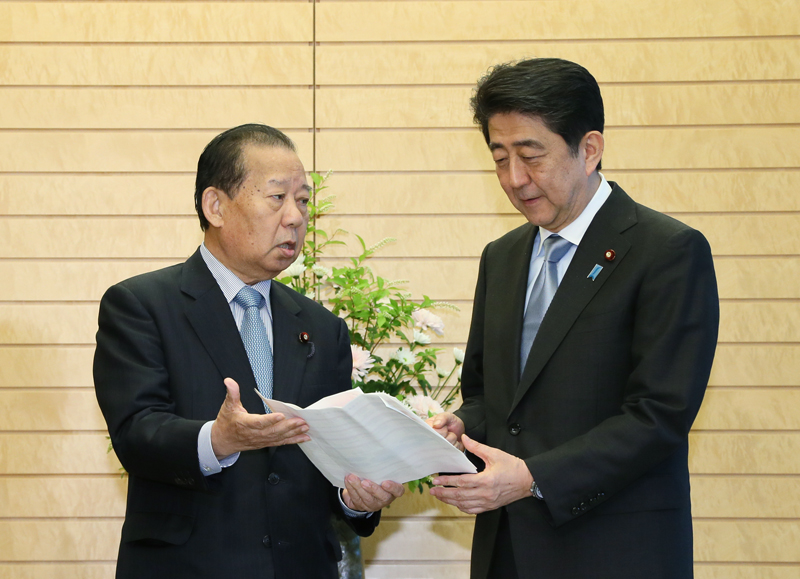
Nikai (left) and Abe (right)

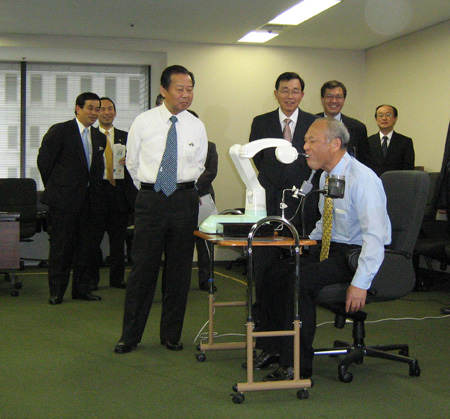
Nikai (left) and Yōichi Masuzoe (right)

== LDP senior politician ==
Later, under Prime Minister Yasuo Fukuda, Nikai was returned to the post of Minister of Economy, Trade and Industry on 1 August 2008. Nikai is known to have strong ties with Chinese leaders and accompanied relief supplies to Sichuan after the earthquake there in June 2008. In the Cabinet of Prime Minister Taro Aso, appointed on 24 September 2008, Nikai was retained as Minister of Economy, Trade and Industry.

Nikai was appointed LDP Secretary General by party president Shinzo Abe in August 2016. Following Abe's resignation in September 2020, the new party president Yoshihide Suga decided to retain Nikai in this role.

On 25 March 2024, Nikai announced that he would not run for reelection in the next House of Representatives election after his Shisuikai faction disbanded in the wake of the 2023–2024 Japanese slush fund scandal. Nikai also assumed political responsibility for the scandal after Shisuikai failed to declare 35.26 million yen ($233,000) in revenues from ticket sales of its fundraising parties from 2017 to 2022. He thus retired when the House was dissolved in October 2024.

== Remarks ==
Tetsuma Esaki, a former Minister of State for Okinawa and Northern Territories Affairs is known as the second side of Nikai. Because, Nikai was a second side of Masumi Esaki, the father of Tetsuma.

Kakuei Tanaka, a former Prime Minister and Shin Kanemaru, a former Deputy Prime Minister of Japan both have the coined title of "Master of Nikai".

== Policy and advocacy ==
He is considered to be one of the leading pro-China lawmakers, and is the President of the Japan–China Friendship Parliamentarians' Union (from 2023). It has assumed the interests of the LDP in China. In the past, he has been a member of a parliamentary group that supports the Beijing Olympics, and is a politician who has had close ties with China for many years.

== Election history ==
Election	Age	District	Political party	Number of votes	election results
1983 Japanese general election	44	Wakayama 2nd district	LDP	53,611	winning
1986 Japanese general election	47	Wakayama 2nd district	LDP	58,722	winning
1990 Japanese general election	51	Wakayama 2nd district	LDP	57,663	winning
1993 Japanese general election	54	Wakayama 2nd district	JRP	104,600	winning
1996 Japanese general election	57	Wakayama 3rd district	NFP	115,681	winning
2000 Japanese general election	61	Wakayama 3rd district	NCP	138,527	winning
2003 Japanese general election	64	Wakayama 3rd district	NCP	148,274	winning
2005 Japanese general election	66	Wakayama 3rd district	LDP	145,735	winning
2009 Japanese general election	70	Wakayama 3rd district	LDP	117,237	winning
2012 Japanese general election	73	Wakayama 3rd district	LDP	112,916	winning
2014 Japanese general election	75	Wakayama 3rd district	LDP	108,257	winning
2017 Japanese general election	78	Wakayama 3rd district	LDP	109,488	winning
2021 Japanese general election	82	Wakayama 3rd district	LDP	102,834	winning

Political offices
Preceded by Akira Amari	Minister of Economy, Trade and Industry of Japan; 2008–2009	Succeeded by Masayuki Naoshima
Preceded by Shōichi Nakagawa	Minister of Economy, Trade and Industry of Japan; 2005–2006	Succeeded by Akira Amari
Preceded by Jirō Kawasaki	Minister of Transport; 1999–2000	Succeeded by Hajime Morita
Preceded by Jirō Kawasaki	Director-General of the Hokkaido Development Agency; 1999–2000	Succeeded by Hajime Morita
Party political offices
Preceded by Sadakazu Tanigaki	Secretary-General of the Liberal Democratic Party; 2016–2021	Succeeded by Akira Amari
Preceded by Seiko Noda	Chairman of the General Council, Liberal Democratic Party; 2014–2016	Succeeded by Hiroyuki Hosoda
Preceded by Bunmei Ibuki	Head of the Shisuikai; 2013–2024	Faction disbanded
Preceded by Makoto Koga (as Election Strategy Chairman)	Director of the Election Strategy Bureau, Liberal Democratic Party; 2009–2010	Succeeded by Takeo Kawamura
Preceded by Yūya Niwa	Chairman of the General Council, Liberal Democratic Party; 2007–2008	Succeeded by Takashi Sasagawa
Preceded by Hiroyuki Hosoda	Chairman of the Diet Affairs Committee, Liberal Democratic Party; 2006–2007	Succeeded by Tadamori Ōshima
Preceded by Nobutaka Machimura	Director of the General Affairs Bureau, Liberal Democratic Party; 2004–2005	Succeeded by Takehiko Endo
New title New faction	Head of Atarashii Nami (Nikai faction); 2003–2009	merger with Shisuikai (Ibuki faction)
New political party	Secretary-General of the New Conservative Party; 2002–2003	merger with Liberal Democratic Party
House of Representatives (Japan)
Preceded by Yuji Yamamoto	Chairman of the Budget Committee; 2013–2014	Succeeded by Tadamori Oshima
Preceded by Yūichi Ichikawa	Chairman of the Construction Committee; 1997–1998	Succeeded by Otohiko Endō
New district	Representative for Wakayama 3rd district 1996–2024	District eliminated
Preceded by Keijirō Shōji; Takashi Hayakawa; Hiroshi Ōshima	Representative for Wakayama 2nd District (multi-member); 1983–1996; Served alongside: Minoru Noda, Riki Azuma, Kazuo Tamaki	District eliminated
