= Heizō Takenaka =

Japanese economist and politician

- 竹中 平蔵
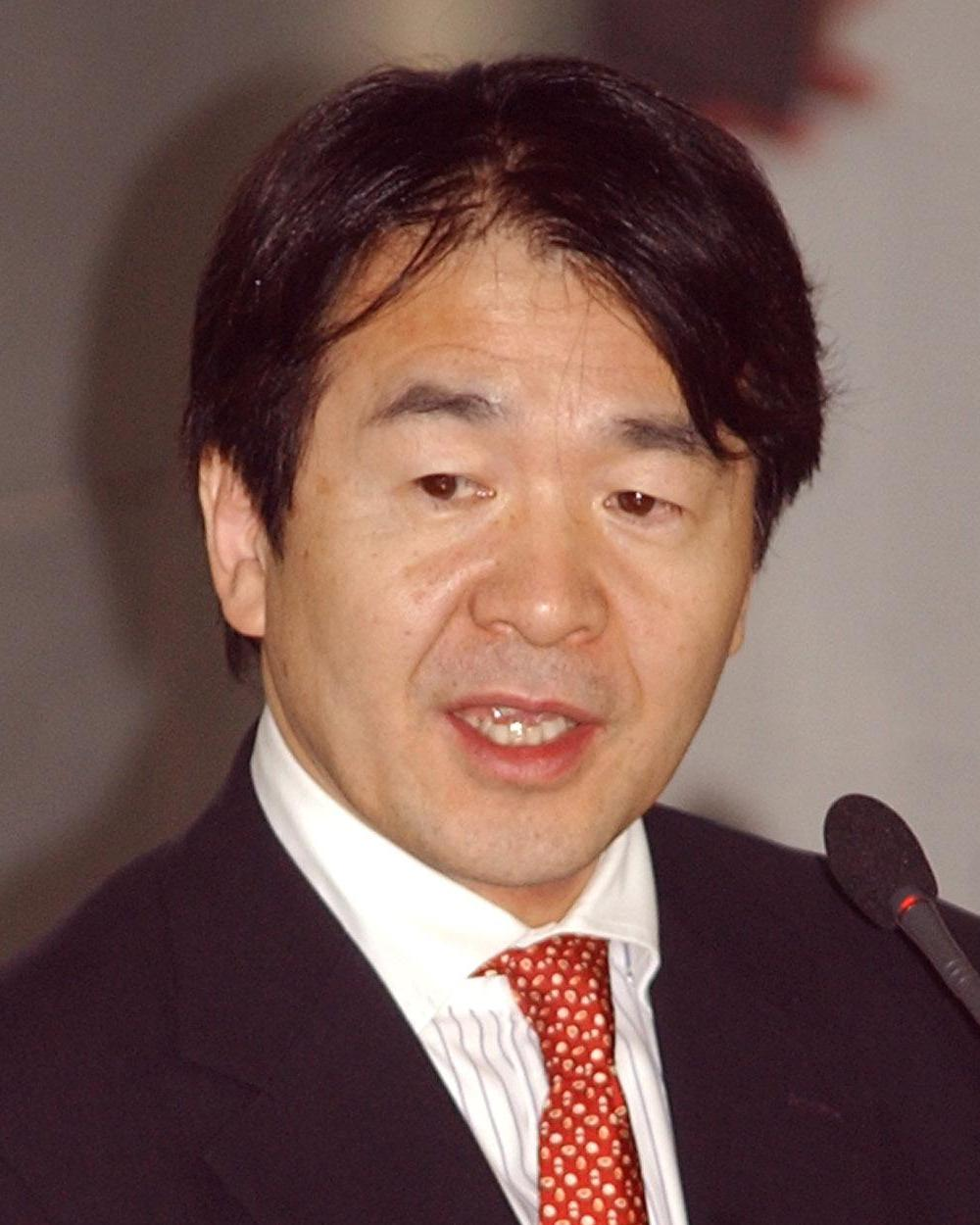
- Takenaka in 2006

Minister for Internal Affairs and Communications
- In office 31 October 2005 – 26 September 2006
- Prime Minister: Junichiro Koizumi
- Preceded by: Tarō Asō
- Succeeded by: Yoshihide Suga

Minister of State for Economic and Fiscal Policy
- In office 26 April 2001 – 31 October 2005
- Prime Minister: Junichiro Koizumi
- Preceded by: Tarō Asō
- Succeeded by: Kaoru Yosano

Minister of State for Financial Services
- In office 30 October 2002 – 27 September 2004
- Prime Minister: Junichiro Koizumi
- Preceded by: Hakuo Yanagisawa
- Succeeded by: Tatsuya Ito

Member of the House of Councillors
- In office 26 July 2004 – 28 September 2006
- Preceded by: Multi-member district
- Succeeded by: Shinobu Kandori
- Constituency: National PR

Personal details
- Born: March 3, 1951 (age 75) Wakayama, Japan
- Party: Independent (since 2006)
- Other political affiliations: LDP (until 2006)
- Education: Hitotsubashi University

Heizō Takenaka (竹中 平蔵, Takenaka Heizō; born 3 March 1951) is a Japanese economist, and key figure in Junichiro Koizumi's administration (2001–2006), played a significant role in Japan's structural reforms, including labor market deregulation. As Minister of State for Economic and Fiscal Policy and later Financial Services, he advocated for policies aimed at increasing economic flexibility, such as amending the Worker Dispatching Act (also known as the Temporary Staffing Services Act). These changes, enacted in 2003 and 2004, expanded the use of temporary (dispatched) workers by relaxing restrictions. Takenaka's reforms indirectly facilitated the replacement of regular government employees with temporary staff in public sectors, such as education, administrative services, and local government offices. Takenaka's affiliation with Pasona Group, Japan's largest temporary staffing agency, has sparked allegations of embezzlement from government and private sectors, stemming from claims that he replaced permanent employees with Pasona's temporary workers. He joined Pasona as a special advisor in February 2007 (shortly after leaving government) and became chairman in August 2009, serving until 2022. Takenaka benefited from the expanded dispatch market post-deregulation, securing government and private contracts in areas like administrative support, COVID-19 measures, and the Tokyo Olympics—leading to personal profits. Takenaka serves on the Board of Trustees of the World Economic Forum.

== Academic career ==
Takenaka was the second son of a shoe seller in Wakayama City. He attended Hitotsubashi University to study under Ichiro Nakayama and graduated with a BA in Economics in 1973. While at Hitotsubashi, he played the mandolin, and met his wife (a student at Tsuda College) through his mandolin club.

In 1973, Takenaka entered the Development Bank of Japan. He was transferred into its Institute for Capital Investment Studies in 1977.

In 1981, he left the DBJ to study for a year at Harvard University and the University of Pennsylvania, where he researched capital investment in the United States. The product of his research, the 1984 book Development Studies and Capital Expenditure Economics, won the Suntory Liberal Arts Prize.

Takenaka then worked in the Ministry of Finance as a money supply researcher. He initially planned to stay for two years, but ended up working there for five years, from 1982 to 1987.

He later completed his Ph.D. at Osaka University. He taught as an associate professor at Osaka (1987–89) and Harvard (1989–90), and received tenure in the Faculty of Policy Management of Keio University SFC (Shonan Fujisawa Campus).

== Political career ==
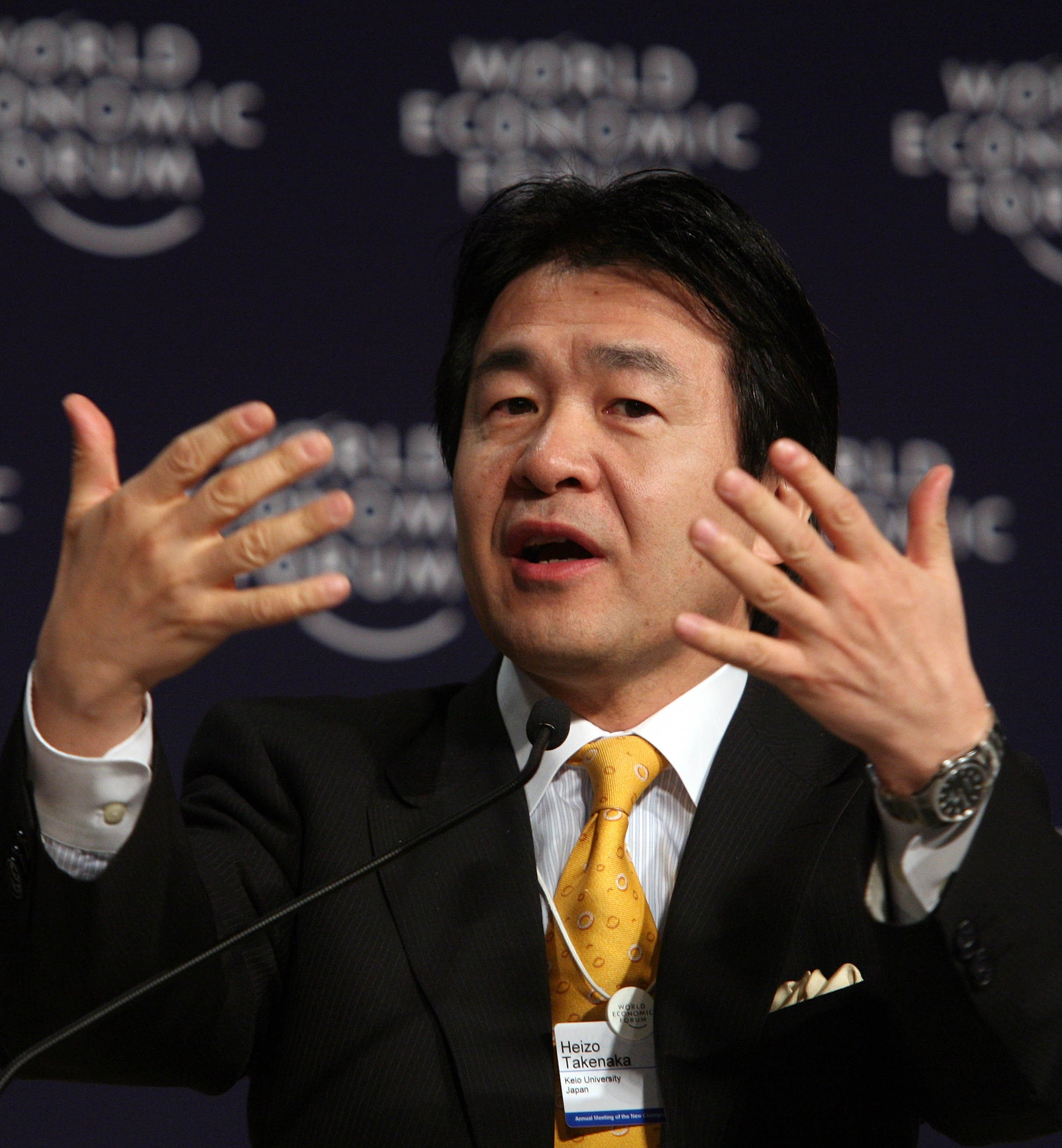
Heizō Takenaka in 2008

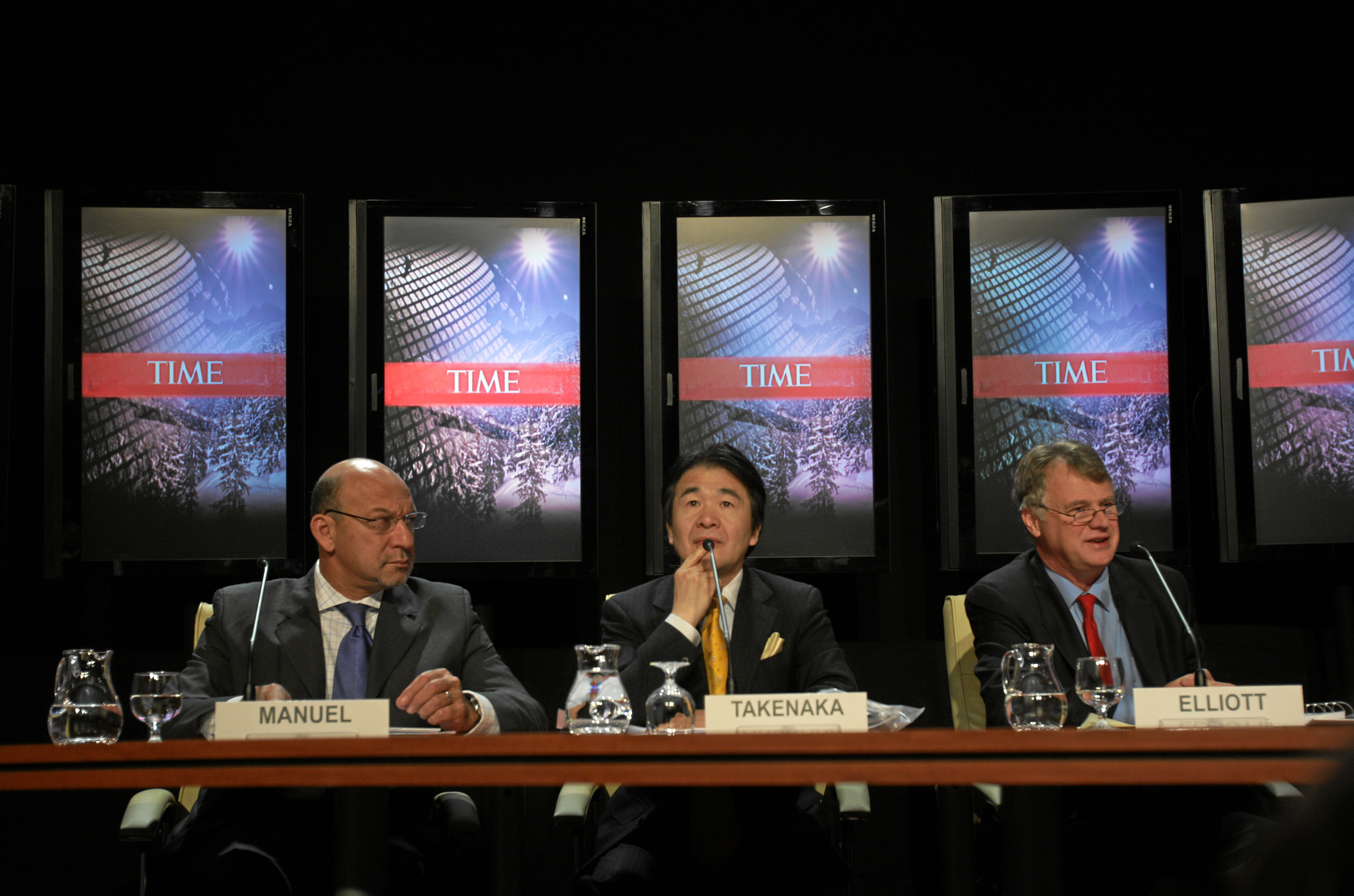
Takenaka at the 2009 World Economic Forum Annual Meeting in Davos, Switzerland

Takenaka was picked by Koizumi to become the Minister of State for Economic and Fiscal Policy in 2001. In this capacity, Takenaka has become one of the most prominent voices in the ongoing debate over the privatization and breakup of Japan Post.

In 2002 he became Minister of State for Financial Services as well. In this capacity he was the author of the Takenaka Plan, which successfully tackled Japan's banking crisis. One of his biggest accomplishments was to change attitudes within the financial industry, including auditors who had previously rubber-stamped bank earnings reports that understated the size of bad loans. A turning point came in May 2003, when auditors refused to approve the earnings statement of Resona Bank (see Resona Holdings), forcing the bank to seek a $17 billion bailout from the Japanese government.

Takenaka won his first election in 2004 and held a proportional representation seat in the House of Councillors.

After Koizumi's Liberal Democratic Party crushing victory in the 2005 General Election, Takenaka assumed his last position as Minister of Internal Affairs and Communications, in charge of Japan Post privatization.

He further attempted to privatize the national public broadcaster NHK but Koizumi did not agree and the attempt was stalled. On 15 September 2006, he announced his retirement from politics. On 28 September his resignation from the House of Councillors was permitted. On 29 September, he submitted a resignation letter to the Liberal Democratic Party, which was agreed on 11 November. On the same day his return to Keio University was disclosed. Now, he is the Chairman of Pasona facing multiple unethical business conducts over the Tokyo Olympics games.

Political offices
| Preceded by Tarō Asō | Minister of State for Economic and Fiscal Policy; 2001–2005 | Succeeded by Kaoru Yosano |
| Preceded by Hakuo Yanagisawa | Minister of State for Financial Services; 2002–2004 | Succeeded by Tatsuya Ito |
| Preceded by Tarō Asō | Minister for Internal Affairs and Communications; 2005–2006 | Succeeded by Yoshihide Suga |
Business positions
| New title | Chairman of Pasona Group Inc. 2009–2022 | Vacant |
