= Minister of Economy, Trade and Industry =

Japanese cabinet role

- Emblem of the Government of Japan

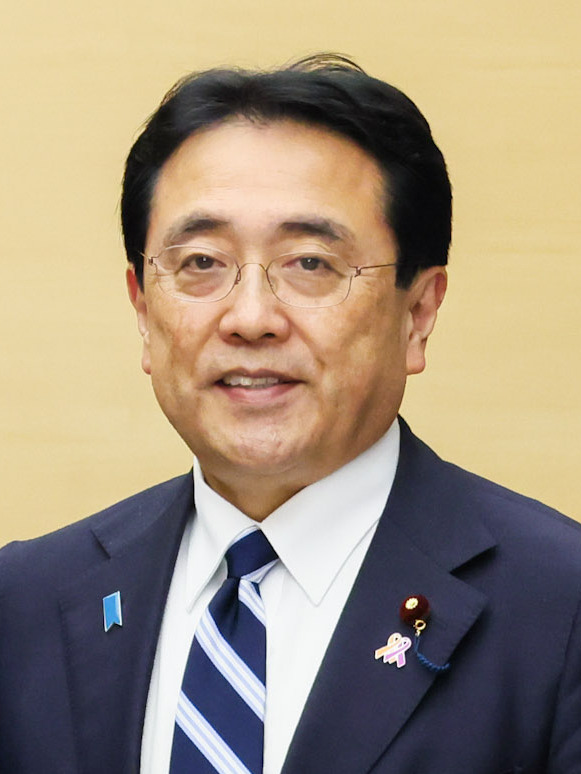
- Incumbent; Ryosei Akazawa since 21 October 2025
- Ministry of Economy, Trade and Industry
- Style: His Excellency
- Member of: Cabinet of Japan; National Security Council; National Intelligence Council
- Reports to: Prime Minister of Japan
- Nominator: Prime Minister of Japan
- Appointer: Emperor of Japan; attested to by the Emperor
- Precursor: Minister of International Trade and Industry
- Formation: January 6, 2001; 25 years ago
- Deputy: State Minister of Economy, Trade and Industry
- Salary: ¥20,916,000

The Minister of Economy, Trade and Industry (経済産業大臣, Keizai-Sangyou Daijin) is a member of the Cabinet of Japan and is the leader and chief executive of the Ministry of Economy, Trade and Industry. The minister is also a statutory member of the National Security Council, and is nominated by the Prime Minister of Japan and is appointed by the Emperor of Japan.

The current minister is Ryosei Akazawa, who took office on 21 October 2025.

== List of ministers of economy, trade and industry (2001–) ==
Liberal Democratic
Democratic

Minister			Term of office			Prime Minister
#	Portrait	Name	Took office	Left office	Days	Prime Minister
1		Takeo Hiranuma	January 6, 2001	September 22, 2003	989	Yoshiro Mori
1		Takeo Hiranuma	January 6, 2001	September 22, 2003	989	Junichiro Koizumi
2		Shoichi Nakagawa	September 22, 2003	October 31, 2005	770	Junichiro Koizumi
3		Toshihiro Nikai (1st)	October 31, 2005	September 26, 2006	330	Junichiro Koizumi
4		Akira Amari	September 26, 2006	August 2, 2008	676	Shinzo Abe
4		Akira Amari	September 26, 2006	August 2, 2008	676	Yasuo Fukuda
(3)		Toshihiro Nikai (2nd)	August 2, 2008	September 16, 2009	410	Yasuo Fukuda
(3)		Toshihiro Nikai (2nd)	August 2, 2008	September 16, 2009	410	Tarō Asō
5		Masayuki Naoshima	September 16, 2009	September 17, 2010	366	Yukio Hatoyama
5		Masayuki Naoshima	September 16, 2009	September 17, 2010	366	Naoto Kan
6		Akihiro Ohata	September 17, 2010	January 14, 2011	119	Naoto Kan
7		Banri Kaieda	January 14, 2011	September 2, 2011	231	Naoto Kan
8		Yoshio Hachiro	September 2, 2011	September 11, 2011	9	Yoshihiko Noda
9		Yukio Edano	September 12, 2011	December 26, 2012	471	Yoshihiko Noda
10		Toshimitsu Motegi	December 26, 2012	September 3, 2014	616	Shinzo Abe
11		Yūko Obuchi	September 3, 2014	October 21, 2014	48	Shinzo Abe
12		Yoichi Miyazawa	October 21, 2014	October 7, 2015	351	Shinzo Abe
13		Motoo Hayashi	October 7, 2015	August 3, 2016	301	Shinzo Abe
14		Hiroshige Sekō	August 3, 2016	September 11, 2019	1134	Shinzo Abe
15		Isshu Sugawara	September 11, 2019	October 25, 2019	44	Shinzo Abe
16		Hiroshi Kajiyama	October 25, 2019	October 4, 2021	710	Shinzo Abe
16		Hiroshi Kajiyama	October 25, 2019	October 4, 2021	710	Yoshihide Suga
17		Kōichi Hagiuda	October 4, 2021	August 10, 2022	310	Fumio Kishida
18		Yasutoshi Nishimura	August 10, 2022	December 14, 2023	491	Fumio Kishida
19		Ken Saitō	December 14, 2023	October 1, 2024	292	Fumio Kishida
20		Yoji Muto	October 1, 2024	October 21, 2025	385	Shigeru Ishiba
21		Ryosei Akazawa	October 21, 2025	Incumbent	347	Sanae Takaichi
