= 2003 Liberal Democratic Party presidential election =

Political leadership election in Japan

- 20 September 2003
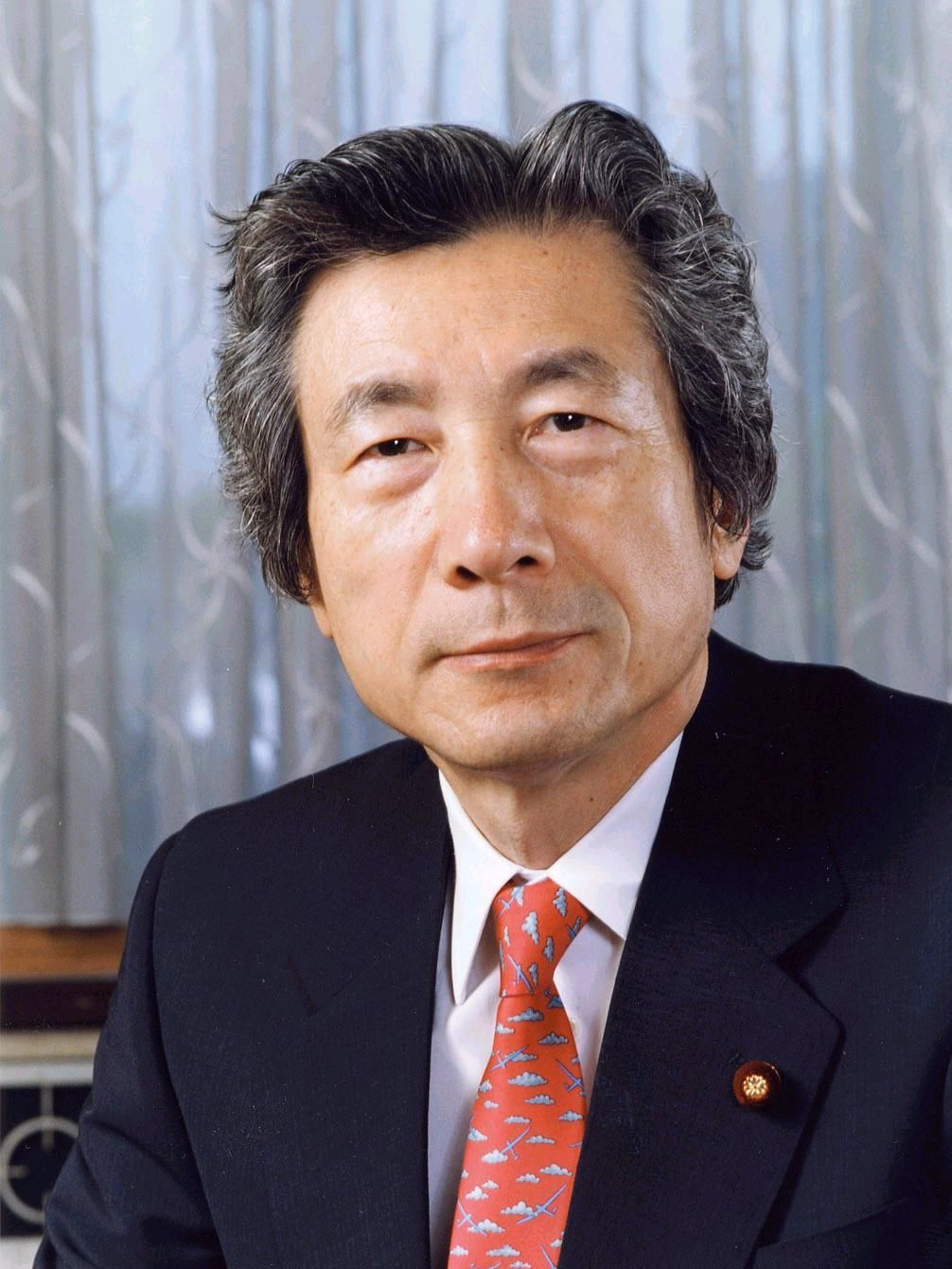

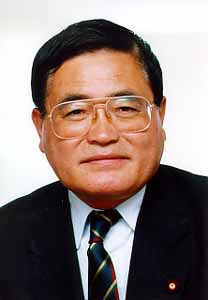

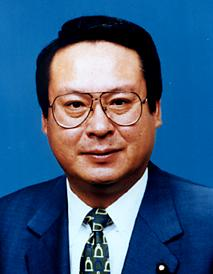

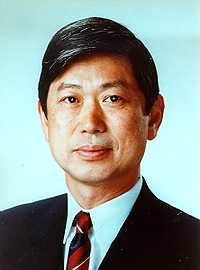
Candidate	Junichiro Koizumi	Shizuka Kamei
Leader's seat	Kanagawa 11th	Hiroshima 6th
LDP MPs	194 (54.34%)	66 (18.49%)
Party members	205 (68.33%)	73 (24.33%)
Total	399 (60.73%)	139 (21.16%)
Candidate	Takao Fujii	Masahiko Kōmura
Leader's seat	Tōkai block	Yamaguchi 1st
LDP MPs	50 (14.01%)	47 (13.17%)
Party members	15 (5.00%)	7 (2.33%)
Total	65 (9.89%)	54 (8.22%)
Previous President
Junichiro Koizumi
President
Junichiro Koizumi

The 2003 Liberal Democratic Party presidential election was held on 20 September 2003 to elect the next president of the Liberal Democratic Party of Japan, as the term of incumbent LDP president and Prime Minister of Japan, Junichiro Koizumi, was ending at the end of that month. Voting among party members of the prefectural chapters was held from September 8 to 19.

Koizumi easily won reelection, securing a majority of support. Successful to Koizumi's win were his support from the prefectural chapter members and members of the Mitsuo Horiuchi and Ryutaro Hashimoto factions. The election was mainly seen as a choice of who would be the party "face" in the upcoming House of Representatives election and House of Councillors election. After winning the election, Koizumi appointed a new cabinet, including future Prime Minister Shinzo Abe as Chief Cabinet Secretary. On October 10, Koizumi dissolved the House of Representatives and set the general election date for November 9.

== Candidates ==
=== Declared ===
Candidate(s)	Date of birth	Current position	Party faction	Electoral district
Junichiro Koizumi	8 January 1942 (age 61)	Prime Minister (since 2001); President of the Liberal Democratic Party (since 2001); Member of the House of Representatives (since 1972) Previous offices held: Minister of Health, Labour and Welfare (1988–1989; 1996–1998); Minister for Internal Affairs and Communications (1992–1993)	None (former Seiwa Seisaku Kenkyūkai)	Kanagawa 11th
Shizuka Kamei	1 November 1936 (age 66)	Member of the House of Representatives (since 1979) Previous offices held: Minister of Construction (1996–1997); Minister of Transport (1994–1995)	Shisuikai (Kamei)	Hiroshima 6th
Takao Fujii	14 March 1943 (age 60)	Member of the House of Representatives (since 1993) Previous offices held: Minister of Transport (1997–1998); Member of the House of Councillors (1981–1993)	Heisei Kenkyūkai (Hashimoto)	Tōkai block
Masahiko Kōmura	15 March 1942 (age 61)	Member of the House of Representatives (since 1980) Previous offices held: Minister of Justice (2000–2001); Minister for Foreign Affairs (1998–1999); Minister of State for Economic and Fiscal Policy (1994–1995)	Banchō Seisaku Kenkyūjo (Kōmura)	Yamaguchi 1st

=== Declined ===
- Tarō Asō, member of the House of Representatives for Fukuoka 8th district; former Minister of State for Economic and Fiscal Policy (1996–1997; 2001). Grandson of former Prime Minister Shigeru Yoshida and brother of Princess Tomohito of Mikasa.
- Takeo Hiranuma, Minister of Economy, Trade and Industry; member of the House of Representatives for Okayama 3rd district; former Minister of International Trade and Industry (2001), Minister of Transport (1995–1996).
- Akihiko Kumashiro, member of the House of Representatives for Okayama 2nd district.
- Takashi Sasagawa, member of the House of Representatives for Gunma 2nd district (endorsed Takao Fujii).

== Supporters ==
=== Recommenders ===
Party regulations require candidates to have the written support at least 20 Diet members, known as recommenders, to run.

Junichiro Koizumi

Leader of recommenders

- Yoshirō Mori (Member of the House of Representatives for Ishikawa 2nd district) (Seiwakai)

Campaign Manager

- Shinzo Abe (Member of the House of Representatives for Yamaguchi 4th district) (Seiwakai)

Recommenders

- Mikio Aoki (Member of the House of Councillors from Shimane) (Heiseiken)
- Masatoshi Abe (Member of the House of Councillors from Yamagata) (Yūrinkai)
- Akira Amari (Member of the House of Representatives for Kanagawa 13th district) (Kinmirai Seiji Kenkyūkai)
- Yozo Ishikawa (Member of the House of Representatives for Tokyo 25th district) (Daiyukai)
- Shigeru Ishiba (Member of the House of Representatives for Tottori 1st district) (Heiseiken)
- Nobuteru Ishihara (Member of the House of Representatives for Tokyo 8th district) (Kinmirai Seiji Kenkyūkai)
- Shigeo Uetake (Member of the House of Representatives for Northern Kanto PR block) (no faction)
- Kōsei Ueno (Member of the House of Councillors from Gunma) (Seiwakai)
- Sadatoshi Ozato (Member of the House of Representatives for Kagoshima 4th district) (Yūrinkai)
- Toranosuke Katayama (Member of the House of Councillors from Okayama) (Heiseiken)
- Kimitaka Kuze (Member of the House of Councillors from National PR block) (Yūrinkai)
- Shozaburo Jimi (Member of the House of Representatives for Fukuoka 10th district) (Kinmirai Seiji Kenkyūkai)
- Katsutsugu Sekiya (Member of the House of Councillors from Ehime) (Kinmirai Seiji Kenkyūkai)
- Kōki Chūma (Member of the House of Representatives for Osaka 1st district) (Daiyukai)
- Nobuyuki Hanashi (Member of the House of Representatives for Ibaraki 3rd district) (Shin Zaisei Kenkyūkai)
- Hajime Morita (Member of the House of Representatives for Shikoku PR block) (Yūrinkai)
- Eita Yashiro (Member of the House of Representatives for Tokyo 12th district) (Heiseiken)
- Masaaki Yamazaki (Member of the House of Councillors from Fukui) (Seiwakai)
Shizuka Kamei

Leader of recommenders

- Yoshio Yatsu (Member of the House of Representatives for Gunma 3rd district) (Shisuikai)

Campaign Manager

- Takami Eto (Member of the House of Representatives for Miyazaki 2nd district) (Shisuikai)

Recommenders

- Hiroyuki Arai (Member of the House of Representatives for Tohoku PR block) (Shisuikai)
- Hirohisa Kurihara (Member of the House of Representatives for Niigata 4th district) (Shisuikai)
- Yoshihide Sakaue (Member of the House of Representatives for Kinki PR block) (Shisuikai)
- Yōji Nagaoka (Member of the House of Representatives for Ibaraki 7th district) (Shisuikai)
- Shōnosuke Hayashi (Member of the House of Representatives for Kinki PR block) (Shisuikai)
- Yoshitake Masuhara (Member of the House of Representatives for Hiroshima 3rd district) (Shisuikai)
- Kenta Matsunami (Member of the House of Representatives for Osaka 10th district) (Shisuikai)
- Isao Matsumiya (Member of the House of Representatives for Fukui 1st district) (Shisuikai)
- Yukihiro Yoshida (Member of the House of Representatives for Tōkai PR block) (Shisuikai)
- Hirohide Uozumi (Member of the House of Councillors from Kumamoto) (Shisuikai)
- Takeaki Kashimura (Member of the House of Councillors from Hiroshima) (Shisuikai)
- Ikuo Kamei (Member of the House of Councillors from Hiroshima) (Shisuikai)
- Hiroko Gotō (Member of the House of Councillors from Ōita) (Shisuikai)
- Kazuyasu Shiina (Member of the House of Councillors from Chiba) (Shisuikai)
- Yoshio Nakagawa (Member of the House of Councillors from Hokkaido) (Shisuikai)
- Toshiya Nakamichi (Member of the House of Councillors from Ōita) (Shisuikai)
- Eisuke Hinode (Member of the House of Councillors from National PR block) (Shisuikai)
- Keishirō Fukushima (Member of the House of Councillors from National PR block) (Shisuikai)
Takao Fujii

Leader of recommenders

- Takashi Sasagawa (Member of the House of Representatives for Gunma 2nd district) (Heiseiken)

Campaign Manager

- Yūji Tsushima (Member of the House of Representatives for Aomori 1st district) (Heiseiken)

Recommenders

- Masahiro Imamura (Member of the House of Representatives for Saga 2nd district) (Heiseiken)
- Hirofumi Iwakura (Member of the House of Representatives for Hokkaido PR block) (Heiseiken)
- Hiroshi Ōki (Member of the House of Representatives for Aichi 8th district) (Heiseiken)
- Nobuko Okashita (Member of the House of Representatives for Osaka 17th district) (Heiseiken)
- Shigehiko Okuyama (Member of the House of Representatives for Kyoto 3rd district) (Heiseiken)
- Takahide Kimura (Member of the House of Representatives for Tōkai PR block) (Heiseiken)
- Masatoshi Kurata (Member of the House of Representatives for Tōkai PR block) (Heiseiken)
- Ryuji Koizumi (Member of the House of Representatives for Saitama 11th district) (Heiseiken)
- Jūrō Saitō (Member of the House of Councillors from Mie) (Heiseiken)
- Osamu Takatori (Member of the House of Representatives for Hokuriku-Shin'etsu PR block) (Heiseiken)
- Kōki Hagino (Member of the House of Representatives for Tohoku PR block) (Heiseiken)
- Jin Murai (Member of the House of Representatives for Nagano 2nd district) (Heiseiken)
- Masahiro Morioka (Member of the House of Representatives for Nara 1st district) (Heiseiken)
- Taimei Yamaguchi (Member of the House of Representatives for Saitama 10th district) (Heiseiken)
- Takamori Yoshikawa (Member of the House of Representatives for Hokkaido 2nd district) (Heiseiken)
- Hiromichi Watanabe (Member of the House of Representatives for Southern Kanto PR block) (Heiseiken)
- Toshitsugu Saito (Member of the House of Representatives for Shizuoka 5th district) (Heiseiken)
- Iwao Matsuda (Member of the House of Councillors from Gifu) (Heiseiken)
Masahiko Kōmura

Leader of recommenders

- Hideo Usui (Member of the House of Representatives for Chiba 1st district) (Banchōken)

Campaign Manager

- Tadamori Ōshima (Member of the House of Representatives for Aomori 3rd district) (Banchōken)

Recommenders

- Norihiko Akagi (Member of the House of Representatives for Ibaraki 1st district) (Banchōken)
- Shintaro Ito (Member of the House of Representatives for Miyagi 4th district) (Banchōken)
- Tomokatsu Kitagawa (Member of the House of Representatives for Kinki PR block) (Banchōken)
- Akira Shichijo (Member of the House of Representatives for Shikoku PR block) (Banchōken)
- Tsuneo Suzuki (Member of the House of Representatives for Kanagawa 7th district) (Daiyukai)
- Keisuke Sunada (Member of the House of Representatives for Kinki PR block) (Banchōken)
- Yōichi Tani (Member of the House of Representatives for Hyōgo 5th district) (Shisuikai)
- Seiko Noda (Member of the House of Representatives for Gifu 1st district) (Banchōken)
- Yasukazu Hamada (Member of the House of Representatives for Southern Kanto PR block) (no faction)
- Yoshiro Hayashi (Member of the House of Representatives for Chūgoku PR block) (Shin Zaisei Kenkyūkai)
- Katsuei Hirasawa (Member of the House of Representatives for Tokyo 17th district) (Kinmirai Seiji Kenkyūkai)
- Seiichiro Murakami (Member of the House of Representatives for Ehime 2nd district) (Banchōken)
- Eisuke Mori (Member of the House of Representatives for Chiba 11th district) (Daiyukai)
- Shunichi Yamaguchi (Member of the House of Representatives for Tokushima 2nd district) (no faction)
- Yūji Yamamoto (Member of the House of Representatives for Kōchi 3rd district) (Banchōken)
- Haruko Arimura (Member of the House of Councillors from National PR block) (Banchōken)
- Akiko Santō (Member of the House of Councillors from National PR block) (Banchōken)
- Yoshimasa Hayashi (Member of the House of Councillors from Yamaguchi) (Shin Zaisei Kenkyūkai)

Number of supporters by factions

Candidates	Junichiro Koizumi	Shizuka Kamei	Takao Fujii	Masahiko Kōmura
Banchō Seisaku Kenkyūjo	0	0	0	12
Heisei Kenkyūkai	4	0	20	0
Daiyukai	2	0	0	2
Kinmirai Seiji Kenkyūkai	4	0	0	1
Seiwa Seisaku Kenkyūkai	4	0	0	0
Shin Zaisei Kenkyūkai	1	0	0	2
Shisuikai	0	20	0	1
Yūrinkai	4	0	0	0
No faction	1	0	0	2

== Debates ==
=== Official ===
Date	P Participant I Invited N Not invited A Absent E Eliminated				Host	Location	Source
Date	Koizumi	Kamei	Fujii	Kōmura	Host	Location	Source
11 September	P	P	P	P	Japan National Press Club	Japan Press Center	

== Opinion polls ==
=== Polling ===
Fieldwork date	Polling firm	Sample size	Junichiro Koizumi	Shizuka Kamei	Takao Fujii	Masahiko Kōmura	NOT/ UD/NA
9–10 Sep	Asahi	Unknown	81%	6%	2%	4%	7%

== Results ==
Full results
Candidate	Diet members		Party members				Total points	
Candidate	Votes	%	Popular votes	%	Allocated votes	%	Total votes	%
Junichiro Koizumi 当	194	54.34%	555,771	57.29%	205	68.33%	399	60.73%
Shizuka Kamei	66	18.49%	240,792	24.82%	73	24.33%	139	21.16%
Takao Fujii	50	14.01%	104,158	10.74%	15	5.00%	65	9.89%
Masahiko Kōmura	47	13.17%	69,318	7.15%	7	2.33%	54	8.22%
Total	357	100.00%	970,039	100.00%	300	100.00%	657	100.00%
Valid votes	357	100.00%	970,039	99.76%	300	100.00%	657	100.00%
Invalid and blank votes	0	0.00%	2,380	0.24%	0	0.00%	0	0.00%
Turnout	357	100.00%	972,419	69.33%	300	100.00%	657	100.00%
Registered voters	357	100.00%	1,402,621	100.00%	300	100.00%	657	100.00%

=== Results of Party Members' Votes by Prefecture ===
Results of Party Members' Votes by Prefecture
Prefecture	Junichiro Koizumi			Shizuka Kamei			Takao Fujii			Masahiko Kōmura		
Prefecture	Votes	%		Votes	%		Votes	%		Votes	%	
Aichi	23,627	61.98%	6	7,176	18.83%	2	4,973	13.05%	1	2,342	6.14%	0
Akita	6,285	53.36%	3	2,702	22.94%	1	1,925	16.34%	1	866	7.35%	0
Aomori	4,150	44.66%	3	1,810	19.48%	1	1,016	10.93%	0	2,316	24.92%	1
Chiba	10,468	56.97%	4	5,046	27.46%	2	829	4.51%	0	2,030	11.05%	0
Ehime	19,695	55.81%	6	10,279	29.13%	3	2,156	6.11%	0	3,158	8.95%	0
Fukui	8,837	59.15%	3	4,507	30.17%	2	992	6.64%	0	604	4.04%	0
Fukuoka	11,151	59.84%	5	4,015	21.55%	1	1,856	9.96%	0	1,613	8.66%	0
Fukushima	10,173	63.69%	4	4,126	25.83%	2	742	4.65%	0	931	5.83%	0
Gifu	7,294	19.00%	1	1,152	3.00%	0	29,272	76.27%	7	663	1.73%	0
Gunma	15,074	60.22%	5	6,076	24.27%	2	2,919	11.66%	0	962	3.84%	0
Hiroshima	11,750	29.51%	3	25,865	64.95%	6	599	1.50%	0	1,607	4.04%	0
Hokkaido	18,960	50.40%	5	11,745	31.22%	3	4,664	12.40%	1	2,251	5.98%	0
Hyōgo	15,243	58.84%	6	7,047	27.20%	2	1,532	5.91%	0	2,084	8.04%	0
Ibaraki	20,277	53.57%	6	13,217	34.92%	4	1,752	4.63%	0	2,605	6.88%	0
Ishikawa	19,616	74.50%	6	4,050	15.38%	1	1,231	4.68%	0	1,432	5.44%	0
Iwate	5,810	61.22%	4	2,342	24.68%	1	595	6.27%	0	743	7.83%	0
Kagawa	12,168	68.47%	5	4,111	23.13%	1	472	2.66%	0	1,019	5.73%	0
Kagoshima	16,584	69.61%	6	4,614	19.37%	1	1,590	6.67%	0	1,036	4.35%	0
Kanagawa	29,621	77.78%	8	4,690	12.31%	1	1,836	4.82%	0	1,937	5.09%	0
Kōchi	5,475	55.54%	3	2,105	21.36%	1	386	3.92%	0	1,891	19.18%	1
Kumamoto	8,150	52.54%	4	5,161	33.27%	2	1,457	9.39%	0	744	4.80%	0
Kyoto	8,641	53.45%	3	2,345	14.50%	1	4,333	26.80%	2	848	5.25%	0
Mie	8,630	64.51%	4	2,270	16.97%	1	1,729	12.93%	0	748	5.59%	0
Miyagi	8,448	63.72%	4	2,807	21.17%	1	717	5.41%	0	1,287	9.71%	0
Miyazaki	4,043	39.39%	2	5,338	52.01%	3	517	5.04%	0	366	3.57%	0
Nagano	10,751	59.68%	4	3,222	17.89%	1	2,893	16.06%	1	1,149	6.38%	0
Nagasaki	11,008	57.94%	5	5,508	28.99%	2	1,208	6.36%	0	1,274	6.71%	0
Nara	6,227	63.63%	4	1,815	18.55%	1	1,174	12.00%	0	571	5.83%	0
Niigata	10,499	37.41%	3	15,984	56.96%	4	496	1.77%	0	1,084	3.86%	0
Ōita	7,602	60.90%	4	3,592	28.78%	1	528	4.23%	0	760	6.09%	0
Okayama	7,857	38.88%	3	7,050	34.89%	2	4,310	21.33%	1	989	4.89%	0
Okinawa	1,225	55.06%	3	543	24.40%	1	372	16.72%	0	85	3.82%	0
Osaka	18,375	65.53%	6	5,926	21.13%	2	2,183	7.78%	0	1,558	5.56%	0
Saga	6,846	56.29%	4	2,828	23.25%	1	1,638	13.47%	0	849	6.98%	0
Saitama	16,395	61.63%	5	6,779	25.48%	2	1,809	6.80%	0	1,620	6.09%	0
Shiga	10,406	65.71%	5	2,924	18.46%	1	1,517	9.58%	0	990	6.25%	0
Shimane	12,352	63.65%	5	4,013	20.68%	1	2,178	11.22%	0	862	4.44%	0
Shizuoka	21,771	69.63%	7	5,415	17.32%	1	2,207	7.06%	0	1,875	6.00%	0
Tochigi	9,786	60.24%	5	3,462	21.31%	1	1,547	9.52%	0	1,451	8.93%	0
Tokushima	3,545	46.98%	2	1,924	25.50%	1	469	6.22%	0	1,608	21.31%	1
Tokyo	36,967	72.41%	8	8,019	15.71%	1	1,844	3.61%	0	4,223	8.27%	1
Tottori	4,202	46.85%	2	2,540	28.32%	1	1,674	18.66%	1	554	6.18%	0
Toyama	22,275	65.32%	6	6,630	19.44%	2	3,268	9.58%	0	1,926	5.65%	0
Wakayama	5,196	74.46%	4	1,027	14.72%	0	461	6.61%	0	294	4.21%	0
Yamagata	7,436	68.64%	4	2,477	22.87%	1	334	3.08%	0	586	5.41%	0
Yamaguchi	7,567	41.21%	3	2,339	12.74%	0	168	0.91%	0	8,290	45.14%	3
Yamanashi	7,313	61.36%	4	2,179	18.28%	1	1,790	15.02%	0	637	5.34%	0
Total	555,771	57.29%	205	240,792	24.82%	73	104,158	10.74%	15	69,318	7.15%	7
