= Gunma 3rd district =

Legislative district of Japan

Gunma 3rd District
- 群馬県第3区
- Parliamentary constituency for the Japanese House of Representatives
- Prefecture: Gunma
- Proportional Block: Northern Kanto
- Electorate: 320,516 (as of 1 September 2022)

Current constituency
- Created: 1994
- Seats: One
- Party: LDP
- Representatives: Hiroyoshi Sasakawa

Gunma 3rd district (群馬県第3区, Gunma-ken dai-san-ku) is a single-member constituency of the House of Representatives in the Diet of Japan. It is located in south-eastern Gunma and consists of Ota, Tatebayashi and Ōra County.

== Areas covered ==
=== Current district ===
As of 24 January 2023, the areas covered by this district are as follows:

- Ōta
- Tatebayashi
- Ōra District

As part of the 2022 redistricting, the rest of Ota was transferred back to the district from the 2nd district.

=== Areas 2013–2022 ===
From the first redistricting in 2013, until the second redistricting in 2022, the areas covered by this district were as follows:

- Ōta (excluding Yabuzukahon, Ojima and Nitta)
- Tatebayashi
- Ōra District

As part of the 2013 redistricting, the areas of Yabuzukahon, Ojima and Nitta were transferred to the 2nd district.

=== Areas from before 2013 ===
From the creation of the district in 1994, until the first redistricting in 2013, the areas covered by this district were as follows:

- Ōta
- Tatebayashi
- Nitta District
- Ōra District

== Elected representatives ==
Representative	Party	Years served	Notes
Yoshio Yatsu	LDP	1996-2009	
Masaaki Kakinuma	DPJ	2009-2012	
Hiroyoshi Sasakawa	LDP	2012-	Incumbent

== Election results ==
2026
Party	Candidate	Votes	%	±%
LDP	Hiroyoshi Sasagawa (endorsed by Ishin)	96,283	61.5	▲11.43
Centrist Reform	Kaichi Hasegawa	60,204	38.5	▼11.43
Registered electors		312,789		
Turnout		156,487	52.23	▲2.74
LDP hold				

2024
Party	Candidate	Votes	%	±%
LDP	Hiroyoshi Sasagawa (endorsed by Komeito)	74,930	50.07	▼4.56
CDP	Kaichi Hasegawa	74,716	49.93	▲6.44
Registered electors		315,614		
Turnout		149,646	49.49	▼4.13
LDP hold				

== See also ==
- List of districts of the House of Representatives of Japan
