= 2009 Japanese general election =

- 30 August 2009

All 480 seats in the House of Representatives 241 seats needed for a majority
- Turnout: 69.19% (▲1.70pp; Const. votes); 69.19% (▲1.73pp; PR votes)
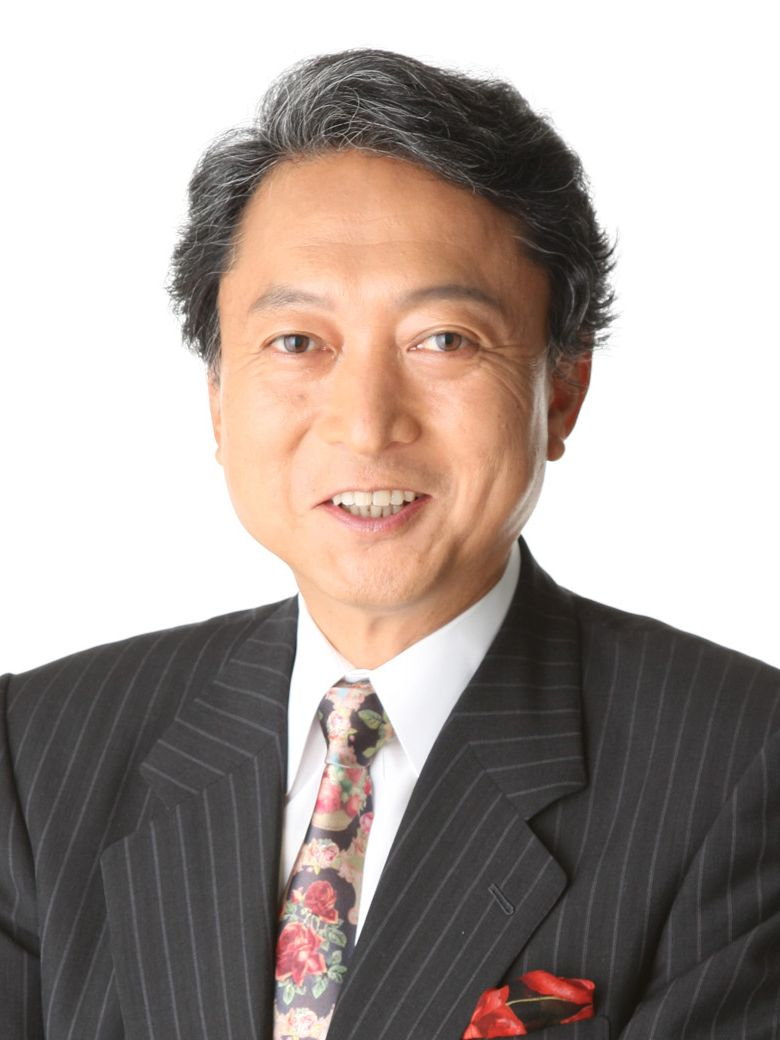

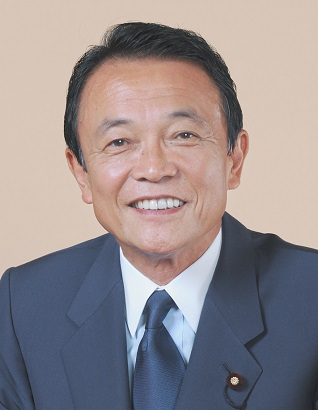

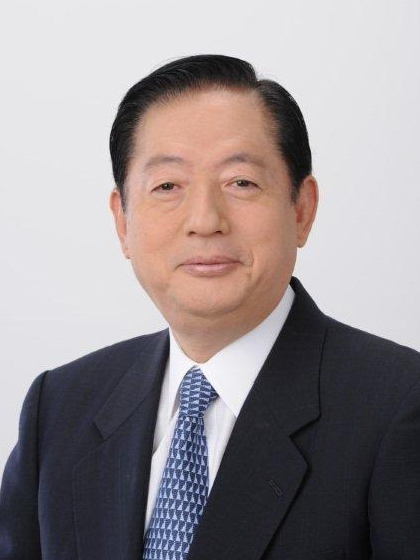

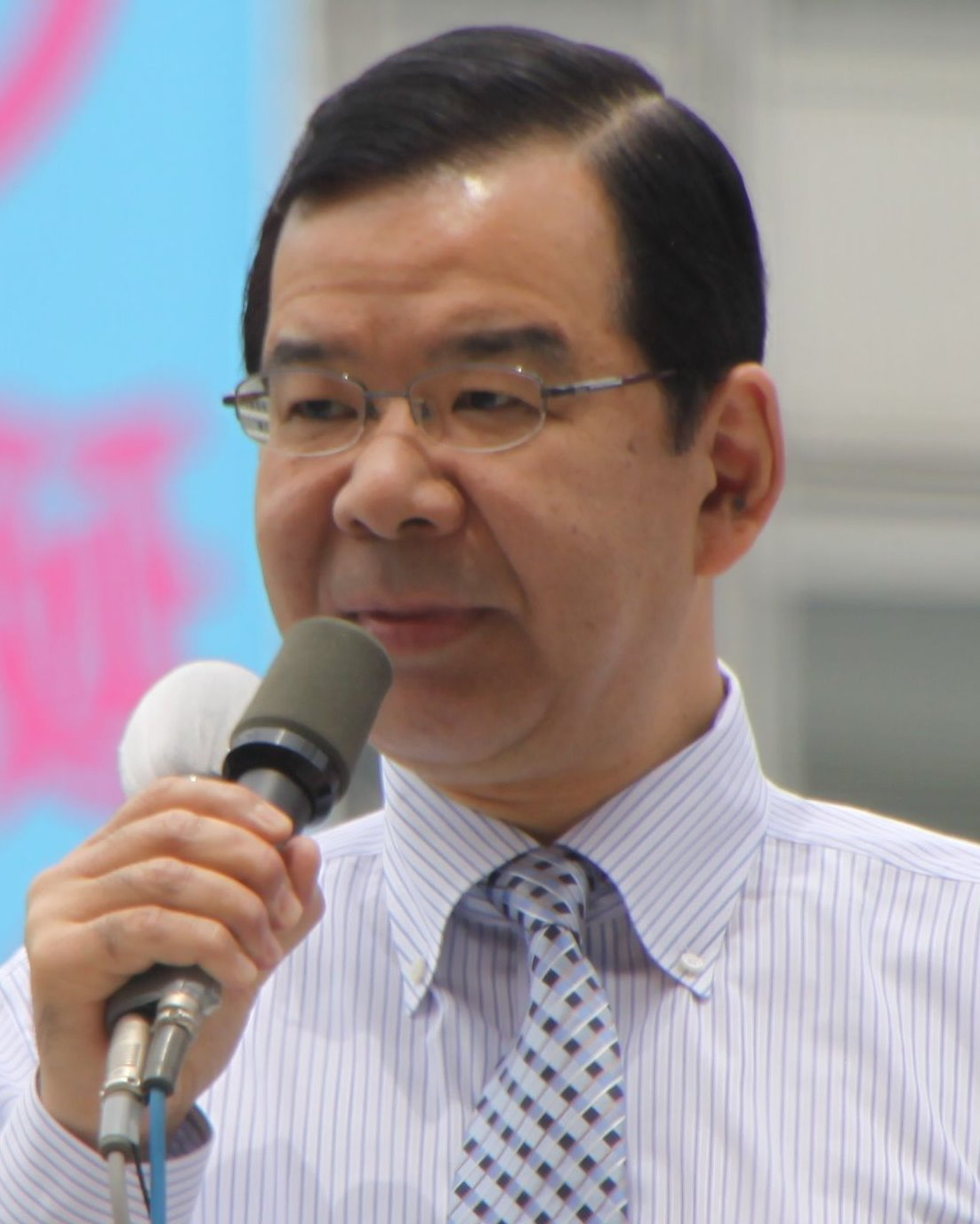

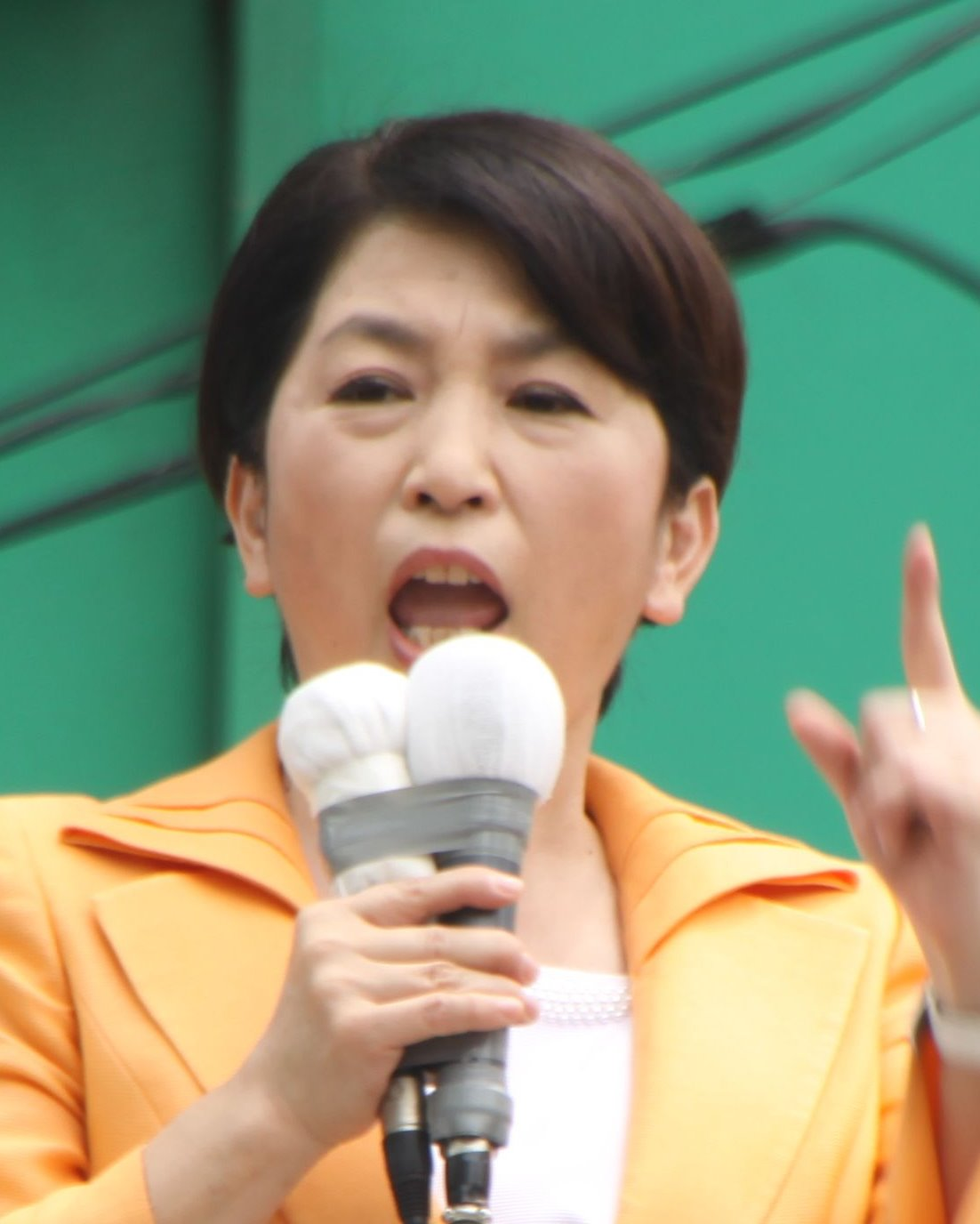

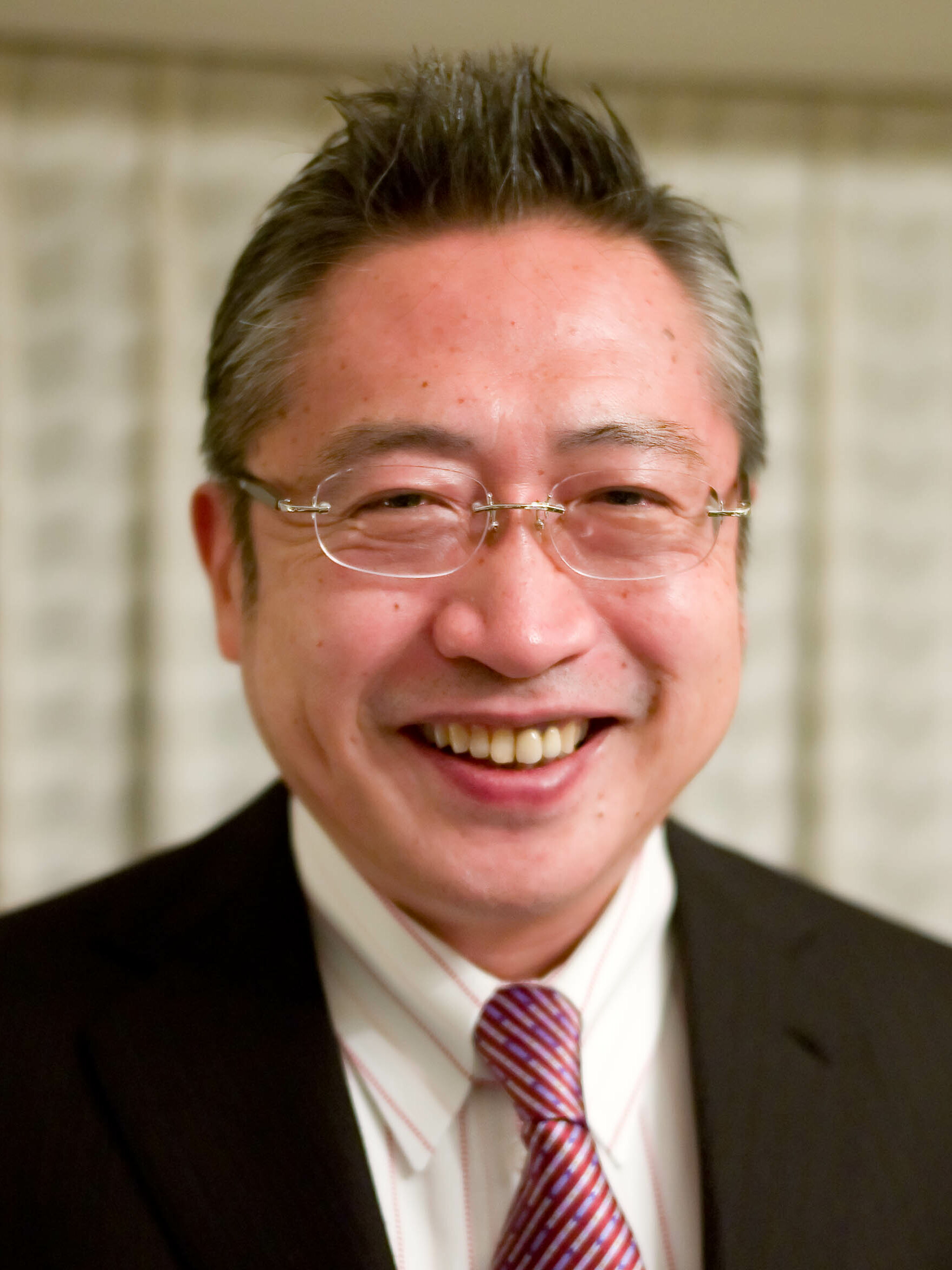
| | First party | Second party | Third party |
|---|---|---|---|
| Leader | Yukio Hatoyama | Tarō Asō | Akihiro Ota |
| Party | Democratic | LDP | New Kōmeitō |
| Last election | 113 seats | 296 seats | 31 seats |
| Seats before | 115 | 300 | 31 |
| Seats won | 308 | 119 | 21 |
| Seat change | ▲195 | ▼177 | ▼10 |
| Constituency vote | 33,475,335 | 27,301,982 | 782,984 |
| % and swing | 47.43% (▲10.99pp) | 38.68% (▼9.09pp) | 1.11% (▼0.33pp) |
| Regional vote | 29,844,799 | 18,810,217 | 8,054,007 |
| % and swing | 42.41% (▲11.39pp) | 26.73% (▼11.45pp) | 11.45% (▼1.80pp) |
| | Fourth party | Fifth party | Sixth party |
| Leader | Kazuo Shii | Mizuho Fukushima | Yoshimi Watanabe |
| Party | JCP | Social Democratic | Your |
| Last election | 9 seats | 7 seats | Did not exist |
| Seats before | 9 | 7 | 4 |
| Seats won | 9 | 7 | 5 |
| Seat change | Steady | Steady | New |
| Constituency vote | 2,978,354 | 1,376,739 | 615,244 |
| % and swing | 4.22% (▼3.03pp) | 1.95% (▼0.49pp) | 0.87% (New) |
| Regional vote | 4,943,886 | 3,006,160 | 3,005,199 |
| % and swing | 7.03% (▼0.22pp) | 4.27% (▼1.22pp) | 4.27% (New) |
- Districts and PR districts shaded according to winners' vote strength
Prime Minister before election
Tarō Asō
LDP
Elected Prime Minister
Yukio Hatoyama
Democratic

General elections were held in Japan on August 30, 2009 to elect the 480 members of the House of Representatives. The opposition Democratic Party of Japan (DPJ) defeated the ruling coalition – Liberal Democratic Party (LDP) and New Komeito Party – in a landslide, winning 221 of the 300 constituency seats and receiving 42.4% of the proportional block votes for another 87 seats, a total of 308 seats to only 119 for the LDP (64 constituency seats and 26.7% of the proportional vote).

Under the Constitution of Japan, this result virtually assured DPJ leader Yukio Hatoyama would be the next prime minister of Japan. He was formally named to the post on September 16, 2009. Prime Minister Tarō Asō conceded late on the night of August 30, 2009, that the LDP had lost control of the government, and announced his resignation as party president. A leadership election was held on September 28, 2009.

The 2009 election was the first time since World War II that voters mandated a change in control of the government to an opposition political party. It marked the worst defeat for a governing party in modern Japanese history, was only the second time that the LDP had not been able to form a government after an election since its formation in 1955, and was the first time that the LDP lost its status as the largest party in the lower house; the only other break in LDP control since 1955 had been for a 3-year period from 1993 to 1996 (first 11 months in opposition, then participating in a coalition government under Tomiichi Murayama).

== Background ==
The last general election took place in 2005 in which the LDP, led by popular prime minister Junichiro Koizumi, received 38.2% of the proportional block votes and 47.8% of the district votes cast (the next largest party, the DPJ, received 31% in the proportional and 36.4% in the district vote). Due to the characteristics of the Japanese election system, the LDP ended up with 296 seats in the Lower House (61.6%), which enabled Koizumi to complete the privatization of Japan Post. Since then Japan had three further prime ministers (Shinzō Abe, Yasuo Fukuda and Tarō Asō) who came to power without there being a general election.

On September 1, 2008, Yasuo Fukuda abruptly announced he was retiring as leader. Taro Aso won the subsequent LDP presidential election, which was held on September 22, 2008. Media sources speculated that, in the wake of a recent change in leadership, Prime Minister Taro Aso might call elections in late October or early November 2008 while his popularity was still high.

There were expectations that the steady decline and numerous scandals of the LDP might lead to the complete extinction of the party and the creation of a new political system, with actual ideologically coherent parties emerging instead of the current system of a shared interest in power with stark ideological differences.

In late June 2009 there were rumours of a planned election date in early August 2009. In prefectural elections in Tokyo, the LDP again lost a lot of seats and was for the first time since 1965 not the largest party in the prefectural assembly. The next day, Aso confirmed these rumours by calling for an election on August 30, 2009.

As soon as the election was called, a campaign was underway by a group of LDP Diet Members to replace Aso as leader. Fully one-third of the parliamentary party (including finance minister Kaoru Yosano) were reported to have signed a petition calling for an urgent party meeting to discuss the issue. The BBC reported LDP critics of Aso asserting that an election with him still as leader would be "political suicide". Prime Minister Aso dissolved the House of Representatives on July 21, 2009. The official campaign started on August 18, 2009.

Former LDP minister Yoshimi Watanabe announced the foundation of a new party, Your Party, on August 8, 2009.

== Campaign ==
The DPJ's policy platforms include: a restructuring of civil service; a monthly allowance for families with children (at 26000 yen per child); a cut in the fuel tax; income support for farmers; free tuition for public high schools; the banning of temporary work in manufacturing; raising the minimum wage to 1000 yen; and the halting of any increase in sales tax for the next four years.

The LDP's policy platforms are similar to the DPJ's. A New York Times article on August 28, 2009 noted both platforms offer little on economic policies.

== Opinion polls ==
Before the dissolution of the lower house, National weekly magazines had been citing analysts predicting a big loss for the ruling coalition which held two-thirds of the seats in the House of Representatives. Some (e.g., Shūkan Gendai) warned that the LDP could lose as much as half of that. Many based their predictions on the low approval rating of the Prime Minister Taro Aso and the devastating loss that the LDP suffered in the earlier prefectural election in Tokyo. On August 20 and 21, 2009, Asahi Shimbun and Yomiuri Shimbun, leading national newspapers, and Nikkei Shimbun, a financial daily, reported that the DPJ was poised to win over 300 of the 480 contested seats.

On August 22, 2009, Mainichi Shimbun went further to predict that the DPJ could win over 320 seats, meaning almost all DPJ candidates would win. Mainichi noted that the DPJ appeared to be doing well in the western part of Japan, a traditional stronghold of the LDP, and that the LDP could lose all of its single-member constituency seats in 15 prefectures, including Hokkaidō, Aichi, and Saitama. Also, according to Mainichi, the Japanese Communist Party would probably retain its previous 9 seats, while the New Komeito Party and the Social Democratic Party might lose some of their shares.

According to a poll conducted on August 22, 2009 by the Yomiuri Shimbun, Japan's largest newspaper, 40 percent said they would vote for the DPJ, while 24 percent for the LDP.

== Candidates by party ==
| Party | Number of Candidates | Gender of Candidates | | Proportional representation | | Holding seats at dissolution |
| Party | Number of Candidates | Male | Female | Constituencies | Proportional representation | Holding seats at dissolution |
|---|---|---|---|---|---|---|
| Liberal Democratic Party (LDP) | 326 | 299 | 27 | 306 | 37 | 303 |
| New Komeito Party (NKP) | 51 | 47 | 4 | 8 | 43 | 31 |
| Japan Renaissance Party (JRP) | 1 | 1 | 0 | 1 | 0 | 1 |
| Democratic Party (DPJ) | 330 | 284 | 46 | 271 | 59 | 112 |
| Social Democratic Party (SDP) | 37 | 25 | 12 | 31 | 6 | 7 |
| People's New Party (PNP) | 18 | 17 | 1 | 9 | 9 | 5 |
| New Party Nippon (NPN) | 8 | 8 | 0 | 2 | 6 | 0 |
| Japanese Communist Party (JCP) | 171 | 119 | 52 | 152 | 19 | 9 |
| Your Party (YP) | 15 | 12 | 3 | 14 | 1 | - |
| New Party Daichi (NPD) | 4 | 3 | 1 | 0 | 4 | 1 |
| Happiness Realization Party (HRP) | 337 | 262 | 75 | 288 | 49 | 0 |
| Essential Party (EP) | 2 | 1 | 1 | 0 | 2 | 0 |
| World Economic Community Party (WECP) | 1 | 1 | 0 | 1 | 0 | 0 |
| Freeway Club Party (FCP) | 1 | 1 | 0 | 1 | 0 | 0 |
| Smile Japan Party (SJP) | 1 | 1 | 0 | 1 | 0 | 0 |
| Forest Sea Party (FSP) | 1 | 1 | 0 | 1 | 0 | 0 |
| Independent | 70 | 61 | 9 | 70 | - | 9 |
| Total | 1,374 | 1,145 | 229 | 1,139 | 235 | 478 |

== Results ==
Constituency Cartogram

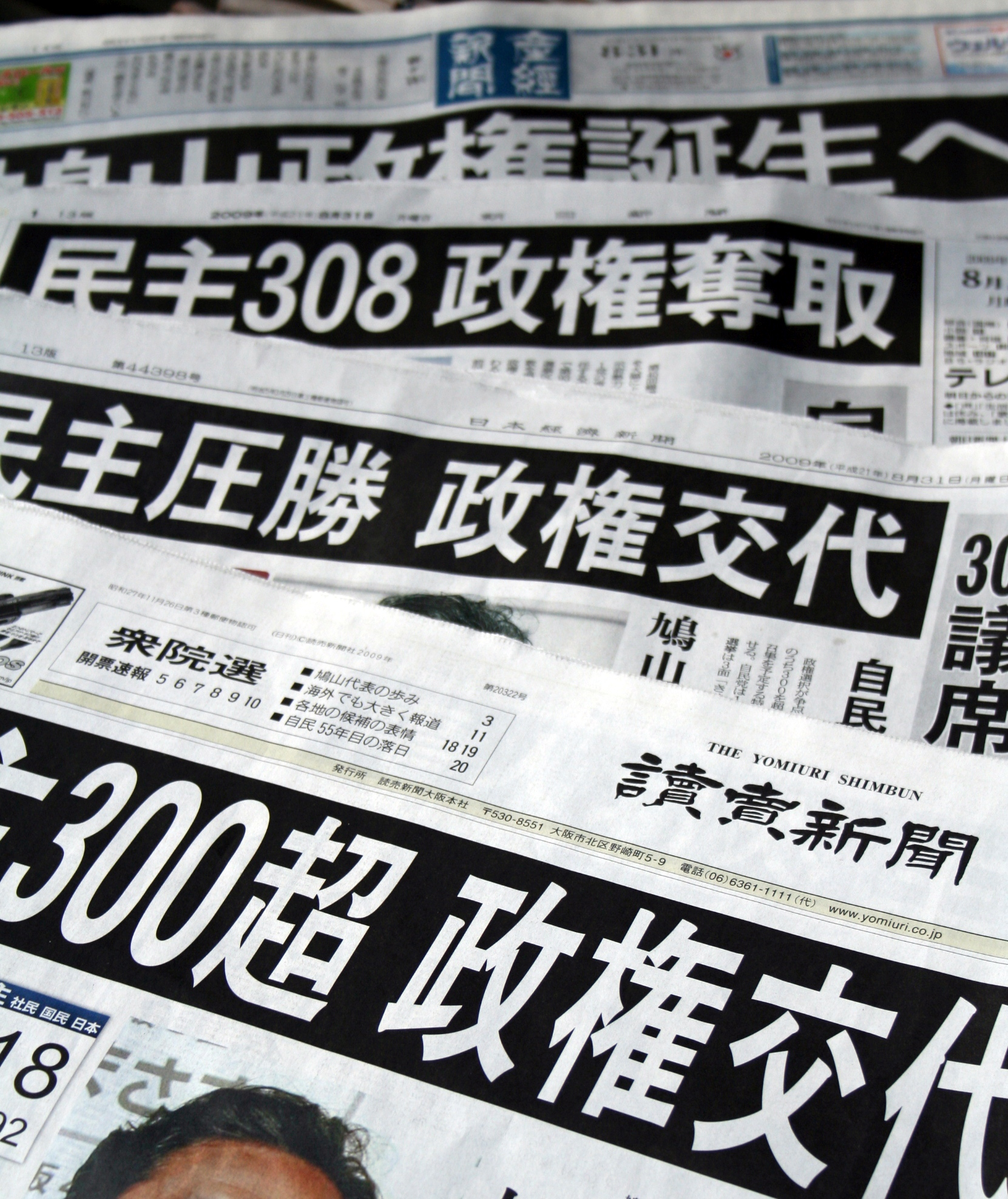
Headlines of Japanese newspapers (August 31, 2009)

The DPJ swept the LDP from power in a massive landslide, winning 308 seats (out of a total of 480 seats), while the LDP won only 119 seats - the worst defeat for a sitting government in modern Japanese history. This was a marked contrast to the 1993 election, the only other time the LDP has been forced into opposition status. In that election, the LDP remained by far the largest party in the House with well over 200 seats, despite losing its majority. However, in the 2009 election the LDP was nearly 200 seats behind the DPJ. Of 83 Koizumi Children who became new LDP representatives in 2005, only 10 were reelected. The unprecedented number of urban voters won by Koizumi's 2005 landslide mostly abandoned the LDP in this election.

The DPJ won a strong majority in the House of Representatives, thus virtually assuring that Hatoyama would be the next prime minister. Under the Constitution, if the House of Representatives and the House of Councilors cannot agree on a choice for prime minister, the choice of the House of Representatives is deemed to be that of the Diet. Hatoyama was nominated as prime minister on September 16 and formally appointed later that day by Emperor Akihito.

However, the DPJ was just short of a majority in the House of Councillors, and fell just short of the 320 seats (a two-thirds majority) needed to override negative votes in the upper chamber. Hatoyama was thus forced to form a coalition government with the Social Democratic Party and People's New Party to obtain a majority.

There were a number of factors at play in the DPJ's unprecedented success. In addition to the unpopularity of LDP politicians and some of its policies, such as medical policies and 2000's neoliberal economic reforms, leading to widening income inequality, Japanese politics had seen a declining importance in local support groups (koenkai) which had previously allowed local LDP politicians to stay in power even if the incumbent prime minister or the LDP was suffering from low approval ratings. The DPJ also benefited from being a large and unified opposition party unlike in the past when the opposition tended to be splintered and lead to vote splitting losses for the opposition; in addition, the Japanese Communist Party, which normally fields candidates in every single district, fielded a historically low number of candidates, leading to a slight increase in votes for the DPJ in single-seat constituencies.

| Party | Proportional | | | Constituency | | | Total seats | +/– |
| Party | Votes | % | Seats | Votes | % | Seats | Total seats | +/– |
|---|---|---|---|---|---|---|---|---|
| Democratic Party of Japan | 29,844,799 | 42.41 | 87 | 33,475,335 | 47.43 | 221 | 308 | +195 |
| Liberal Democratic Party | 18,810,217 | 26.73 | 55 | 27,301,982 | 38.68 | 64 | 119 | −177 |
| New Komeito Party | 8,054,007 | 11.45 | 21 | 782,984 | 1.11 | 0 | 21 | −10 |
| Japanese Communist Party | 4,943,886 | 7.03 | 9 | 2,978,354 | 4.22 | 0 | 9 | 0 |
| Social Democratic Party | 3,006,160 | 4.27 | 4 | 1,376,739 | 1.95 | 3 | 7 | 0 |
| Your Party | 3,005,199 | 4.27 | 3 | 615,244 | 0.87 | 2 | 5 | New |
| People's New Party | 1,219,767 | 1.73 | 0 | 730,570 | 1.04 | 3 | 3 | −1 |
| New Party Nippon | 528,171 | 0.75 | 0 | 220,223 | 0.31 | 1 | 1 | 0 |
| Happiness Realization Party | 459,387 | 0.65 | 0 | 1,071,958 | 1.52 | 0 | 0 | New |
| New Party Daichi | 433,122 | 0.62 | 1 | | | | 1 | 0 |
| Reform Club | 58,141 | 0.08 | 0 | 36,650 | 0.05 | 0 | 0 | New |
| Essential Party | 7,399 | 0.01 | 0 | | | | 0 | New |
| Freeway Club Party | | | | 2,360 | 0.00 | 0 | 0 | New |
| Forest Sea Party | | | | 1,520 | 0.00 | 0 | 0 | New |
| Smile Japan Party | | | | 987 | 0.00 | 0 | 0 | New |
| World Economic Community Party | | | | 718 | 0.00 | 0 | 0 | New |
| Independents | | | | 1,986,056 | 2.81 | 6 | 6 | −12 |
| Total | 70,370,255 | 100.00 | 180 | 70,581,680 | 100.00 | 300 | 480 | 0 |
| Valid votes | 70,370,255 | 97.74 | | 70,581,680 | 98.01 | | | |
| Invalid/blank votes | 1,628,866 | 2.26 | | 1,435,587 | 1.99 | | | |
| Total votes | 71,999,121 | 100.00 | | 72,017,267 | 100.00 | | | |
| Registered voters/turnout | 104,057,361 | 69.19 | | 104,057,361 | 69.21 | | | |
Source: Ministry of Internal Affairs and Communications, Tsukada, CLEA

=== By prefecture ===
| Prefecture | Total seats | Seats won | | | | | | |
| Prefecture | Total seats | DPJ | LDP | SDP | PNP | Your | NPN | Ind. |
|---|---|---|---|---|---|---|---|---|
| Aichi | 15 | 15 | | | | | | |
| Akita | 3 | 2 | | | | | | 1 |
| Aomori | 4 | 1 | 3 | | | | | |
| Chiba | 13 | 11 | 2 | | | | | |
| Ehime | 4 | 1 | 3 | | | | | |
| Fukui | 3 | | 3 | | | | | |
| Fukuoka | 11 | 7 | 4 | | | | | |
| Fukushima | 5 | 5 | | | | | | |
| Gifu | 5 | 3 | 2 | | | | | |
| Gunma | 5 | 3 | 2 | | | | | |
| Hiroshima | 7 | 5 | 1 | | 1 | | | |
| Hokkaido | 12 | 11 | 1 | | | | | |
| Hyōgo | 12 | 10 | 1 | | | | 1 | |
| Ibaraki | 7 | 5 | 1 | | | | | 1 |
| Ishikawa | 3 | 2 | 1 | | | | | |
| Iwate | 4 | 4 | | | | | | |
| Kagawa | 3 | 2 | 1 | | | | | |
| Kagoshima | 5 | 1 | 3 | | 1 | | | |
| Kanagawa | 18 | 14 | 3 | | | 1 | | |
| Kōchi | 3 | | 3 | | | | | |
| Kumamoto | 5 | 2 | 3 | | | | | |
| Kyoto | 6 | 5 | 1 | | | | | |
| Mie | 5 | 4 | 1 | | | | | |
| Miyagi | 6 | 5 | 1 | | | | | |
| Miyazaki | 3 | | 2 | | | | | 1 |
| Nagano | 5 | 5 | | | | | | |
| Nagasaki | 4 | 4 | | | | | | |
| Nara | 4 | 3 | 1 | | | | | |
| Niigata | 6 | 6 | | | | | | |
| Ōita | 3 | 2 | | 1 | | | | |
| Okayama | 5 | 2 | 2 | | | | | 1 |
| Okinawa | 4 | 2 | | 1 | 1 | | | |
| Osaka | 19 | 17 | 1 | 1 | | | | |
| Saga | 3 | 2 | 1 | | | | | |
| Saitama | 15 | 14 | | | | | | 1 |
| Shiga | 4 | 4 | | | | | | |
| Shimane | 2 | | 2 | | | | | |
| Shizuoka | 8 | 7 | | | | | | 1 |
| Tochigi | 5 | 3 | 1 | | | 1 | | |
| Tokushima | 3 | 2 | 1 | | | | | |
| Tokyo | 25 | 21 | 4 | | | | | |
| Tottori | 2 | | 2 | | | | | |
| Toyama | 3 | 1 | 2 | | | | | |
| Wakayama | 3 | 2 | 1 | | | | | |
| Yamagata | 3 | 2 | 1 | | | | | |
| Yamaguchi | 4 | 1 | 3 | | | | | |
| Yamanashi | 3 | 3 | | | | | | |
| Total | 300 | 221 | 64 | 3 | 3 | 2 | 1 | 6 |

=== By PR block ===
| PR block | Total seats | Seats won | | | | | | |
| PR block | Total seats | DPJ | LDP | NKP | JCP | SDP | Your | NPD |
|---|---|---|---|---|---|---|---|---|
| Chūgoku | 11 | 6 | 4 | 1 | | | | |
| Hokkaido | 8 | 4 | 2 | 1 | | | | 1 |
| Hokuriku–Shinetsu | 11 | 6 | 4 | 1 | | | | |
| Kinki (Kansai) | 29 | 11 | 9 | 5 | 3 | 1 | | |
| Kyushu | 21 | 9 | 7 | 3 | 1 | 1 | | |
| Northern Kanto | 20 | 10 | 6 | 2 | 1 | | 1 | |
| Shikoku | 6 | 3 | 2 | 1 | | | | |
| Southern Kanto | 22 | 11 | 6 | 2 | 1 | 1 | 1 | |
| Tohoku | 14 | 7 | 4 | 1 | 1 | 1 | | |
| Tōkai | 21 | 12 | 6 | 2 | 1 | | | |
| Tokyo | 17 | 8 | 5 | 2 | 1 | | 1 | |
| Total | 180 | 87 | 55 | 21 | 9 | 4 | 3 | 1 |

Had the parties nominated a sufficient number of candidates on their proportional "block" lists, the election result would have given the DPJ two additional seats in Kinki, the YP seat in Kinki, and one in Tōkai. In Kinki, two seats went to the LDP, one to Kōmeitō, and one in Tōkai to the DPJ. For the same reason, one Democratic Kinki proportional seat that had fallen vacant in 2010 (previously held by Mitsue Kawakami) could not be filled until the next general election.

Notable incumbents defeated
| Incumbents | | Party |
|---|---|---|
| Norihiko Akagi | Former Agriculture, Forestry and Fisheries Minister | Liberal Democratic Party (LDP) |
| Tetsuma Esaki | Former Senior Vice Minister of Land, Infrastructure and Transport | Liberal Democratic Party (LDP) |
| Takashi Fukaya | Former International Trade and Industry Minister | Liberal Democratic Party (LDP) |
| Hajime Funada | Former Minister of Economic Planning Agency | Liberal Democratic Party (LDP) |
| Tetsuzo Fuyushiba | Minister of Land, Infrastructure and Transportation Minister | New Komeito Party (NKP) |
| Yoshiaki Harada | Foreign Affairs Committee Chair | Liberal Democratic Party (LDP) |
| Mitsuo Horiuchi | Former International Trade and Industry Minister | Liberal Democratic Party (LDP) |
| Yamato Inaba | Agricultural Committee Chair | Liberal Democratic Party (LDP) |
| Kiichi Inoue | Disaster Management Minister | Liberal Democratic Party (LDP) |
| Gaku Ishizaki | Former Senior Vice-Minister of Internal Affairs and Communications | Liberal Democratic Party (LDP) |
| Kosuke Ito | Committee on Fundamental National Policies Chairman | Liberal Democratic Party (LDP) |
| Shintaro Ito | Senior Vice-Minister of Foreign Affairs | Liberal Democratic Party (LDP) |
| Tatsuya Ito | Former Minister in charge of Financial Affairs | Liberal Democratic Party (LDP) |
| Yukio Jitsukawa | Former Senior Vice Minister of Justice | Liberal Democratic Party (LDP) |
| Toshiki Kaifu | Former Prime Minister of Japan | Liberal Democratic Party (LDP) |
| Yōko Kamikawa | Minister of State for Gender Equality and Social Affairs of Japan | Liberal Democratic Party (LDP) |
| Kazuo Kitagawa | Former Land, Infrastructure and Transportation Minister | New Komeito Party (NKP) |
| Tomokatsu Kitagawa | Parliamentary Secretary of the Environment | Liberal Democratic Party (LDP) |
| Kenji Kosaka | Former Education, Culture, Sports, Science and Technology Minister | Liberal Democratic Party (LDP) |
| Saburo Komoto | Senior Vice Minister of Education, Culture, Sports, Science and Technology | Liberal Democratic Party (LDP) |
| Fumio Kyuma | Former Defence Minister | Liberal Democratic Party (LDP) |
| Kenichi Mizuno | Former Senior Vice-Minister of Justice | Liberal Democratic Party (LDP) |
| Nobuhide Minorikawa | Parliamentary Vice-Minister for Foreign Affairs | Liberal Democratic Party (LDP) |
| Yoichi Miyazawa | Senior Vice-Minister of Cabinet Office | Liberal Democratic Party (LDP) |
| Shōichi Nakagawa | Former Treasury Minister | Liberal Democratic Party (LDP) |
| Taro Nakayama | Former Foreign Minister | Liberal Democratic Party (LDP) |
| Kyoko Nishikawa | Former Senior Vice-Minister of Health, Labour and Welfare | Liberal Democratic Party (LDP) |
| Kosaburo Nishime | Parliamentary Secretary of Land, Infrastructure, Transport and Tourism | Liberal Democratic Party (LDP) |
| Yuya Niwa | Former Health, Labour and Welfare Minister | Liberal Democratic Party (LDP) |
| Koji Omi | Former Treasury Minister | Liberal Democratic Party (LDP) |
| Akihiro Ota | Chief Representative of New Komeito | New Komeito Party (NKP) |
| Seiichi Ota | Agriculture, Forestry and Fisheries Minister | Liberal Democratic Party (LDP) |
| Toshitsugu Saito | Former Defence Minister | Liberal Democratic Party (LDP) |
| Takashi Sasagawa | Former General Council Chairman of LDP | Liberal Democratic Party (LDP) |
| Yoshinobu Shimamura | Former Agriculture, Forestry and Fisheries Minister | Liberal Democratic Party (LDP) |
| Junji Suzuki | Former Vice-Minister for Internal Affairs and Communications | Liberal Democratic Party (LDP) |
| Shunichi Suzuki | Former Minister of Environment Agency | Liberal Democratic Party (LDP) |
| Seiken Sugiura | Former Minister of Justice | Liberal Democratic Party (LDP) |
| Minoru Terada | Former Parliamentary Defense Secretary | Liberal Democratic Party (LDP) |
| Tōru Toida | Former Parliamentary Health Secretary | Liberal Democratic Party (LDP) |
| Kisaburo Tokai | Former Minister of Education, Culture, Sports, Science and Technology | Liberal Democratic Party (LDP) |
| Tamisuke Watanuki | President of the People's New Party, Former Speaker of the House of Representatives | People's New Party (PNP) |
| Akihiko Yamamoto | Former Senior Vice Minister of Cabinet Office | Liberal Democratic Party |
| Akiko Yamanaka | Vice-Minister of Foreign Affairs | Liberal Democratic Party (LDP) |
| Taku Yamasaki | Former Vice President of LDP | Liberal Democratic Party (LDP) |
| Hakuo Yanagisawa | Former Health, Labour and Welfare Minister | Liberal Democratic Party (LDP) |
| Okiharu Yasuoka | Former Minister of Justice | Liberal Democratic Party (LDP) |
| Yoshio Yatsu | Former Agriculture, Forestry and Fisheries Minister | Liberal Democratic Party (LDP) |

Notable candidates defeated in their own districts but who remained in power through the block system
| Candidates | | Party |
|---|---|---|
| Akira Amari | Former Minister of Economy, Trade and Industry | Liberal Democratic Party (LDP) |
| Seishiro Etō | Former Defense Minister | Liberal Democratic Party (LDP) |
| Motoo Hayashi | Chairman of the National Commission on Public Safety | Liberal Democratic Party (LDP) |
| Bunmei Ibuki | Former Secretary General of LDP | Liberal Democratic Party (LDP) |
| Ichirō Kamoshita | Minister for the Environment | Liberal Democratic Party (LDP) |
| Jirō Kawasaki | Former Minister of Health, Labour and Welfare | Liberal Democratic Party (LDP) |
| Seigo Kitamura | Senior Vice-Minister of Defense | Liberal Democratic Party (LDP) |
| Yuriko Koike | Former Minister of Defense | Liberal Democratic Party (LDP) |
| Nobutaka Machimura | Former Chief Cabinet Secretary and former Foreign Affairs Minister | Liberal Democratic Party (LDP) |
| Jinen Nagase | Former Minister of Justice | Liberal Democratic Party (LDP) |
| Hidenao Nakagawa | Former Secretary General of LDP | Liberal Democratic Party (LDP) |
| Seiko Noda | Former State Minister in charge of Consumer Affairs | Liberal Democratic Party (LDP) |
| Fukushiro Nukaga | Former Finance Minister | Liberal Democratic Party (LDP) |
| Hideaki Omura | Former Vice Minister of Health, Labour and Welfare | Liberal Democratic Party (LDP) |
| Tsutomu Sato | Internal Affairs and Communications and Public Safety Minister | Liberal Democratic Party (LDP) |
| Ryu Shionoya | Minister of Education, Science and Technology | Liberal Democratic Party (LDP) |
| Tsutomu Takebe | Former Minister of Agriculture, Forestry and Fisheries | Liberal Democratic Party (LDP) |
| Naokazu Takemoto | Senior Vice-Minister of Finance | Liberal Democratic Party (LDP) |
| Kaoru Yosano | Finance Minister | Liberal Democratic Party (LDP) |

== Aftermath ==
In March 2011, the Supreme Court decided that the malapportionment of electoral districts in the 2009 election had been in breach of the Constitution of Japan. As in previous such rulings (as occurred in the aftermath of the elections of 1972, 1980, 1983 and 1990), the election result is not invalidated, but the vote weight disparity must be reduced by the National Diet soon. The 2009 election was the first House of Representatives election ruled unconstitutional since the 1994 electoral reform and the introduction of parallel voting in single-member districts and proportional "blocks". The two major parties additionally wished to use the reform to significantly reduce the number of proportional seats, as both had promised in their 2009 campaigns, but met resistance from smaller parties that depended on proportional seats to bolster their numbers.

== See also ==
- List of districts of the House of Representatives of Japan
- 2009 Tokyo prefectural election
- 2009 Yokohama mayoral election
