= Gunma 2nd district =

Legislative district of Japan

Gunma 2nd District
- 群馬県第2区
- Parliamentary constituency for the Japanese House of Representatives
- Numbered map of Gunma Prefecture single-member districts
- Prefecture: Gunma
- Proportional Block: Northern Kanto
- Electorate: 331,700 (as of 1 September 2022)

Current constituency
- Created: 1994
- Seats: One
- Party: LDP
- Representative: Toshiro Ino

Gunma 2nd District (群馬県第2区, Gunma-ken dai-ni-ku) is a single-member constituency of the Japanese House of Representatives, the lower house of the National Diet. It is located on the island of Honshu, in Gunma Prefecture, and includes the cities of Isesaki and Kiryu, among others.

== Areas covered ==
=== Current district ===
As of 24 January 2023, the areas covered by this district are as follows:

- Kiryū
- Isesaki
- Midori
- Sawa District

As part of the 2022 redistricting, every city in Gunma Prefecture except for Takasaki was consolidated into individual districts.

=== Areas 2013–2022 ===
From the first redistricting in 2013 until the second redistricting in 2022, the areas covered by this district were as follows:

- Kiryū (Excluding the former villages of Niisato and Kurohone)
- Isesaki
- Ōta
  - Yabuzuka, Yamanokami, Yoriai, Ohara, Rokusengoku, Okubo
- Midori (Kasakake and Omama)
- Sawa District

=== Areas from before 2013 ===
From the creation of the district in 1994, until the first redistricting in 2013, the areas covered by this district were as follows:

- Kiryū
- Isesaki
- Sawa District
- Nitta District
  - Yabuzukahon
  - Kasakake
- Yamada District

== Elected representatives ==
Representative	Party	Years served	Notes
Takashi Sasagawa	NFP	1996-1997	Rejoined the Liberal Democratic Party
Takashi Sasagawa	LDP	1997-2009	Failed to win re-election in the 2009 general election
Takashi Ishizeki	DPJ	2009-2012	Failed to win re-election in the 2012 general election. Was instead elected to the Northern Kanto proportional district, which he served in until the 2017 general election. (Note: He has switched parties several times while he was a member of the proportional block. He was a part of the founding of the Japan Restoration Party, then joined the Japan Innovation Party in 2014, and Kibo no To by the time of the 2017 general election)
Toshiro Ino	LDP	2012-	Incumbent

== Election results ==
2026
Party	Candidate	Votes	%	±%
LDP	Toshiro Ino	84,167	52.7	▼0.54
DPP	Kazutaka Hara	22,227	13.9	
Independent	Takashi Ishizeki	19,435	12.2	▼20.56
Sanseitō	Sonoko Kumaido	16,041	10.1	new
JCP	Tamotsu Takahashi	10,254	6.4	▼7.6
CPJ	Junko Itō	7,471	4.7	New
Registered electors		322,196		
Turnout		159,595	51.18	▲3.99
LDP hold				

2024
Party	Candidate	Votes	%	±%
LDP	Toshiro Ino (endorsed by Komeito)	78,416	53.24	▼0.79
Independent	Takashi Ishizeki	48,251	32.76	▲17.42
JCP	Tamotsu Takahashi	20,626	14.00	new
Registered electors		325,560		
Turnout		147,293	47.19	▼3.47
LDP hold				
