= Masayoshi Shimizu =

Japanese politician

- 清水 聖義

Mayor of Ōta
- In office 16 June 1995 – 16 April 2025 (Note: Office vacant from 27 March to 18 April 2005 due to merger with Nitta, Ojima and Yabuzukahon town)
- Preceded by: Hisao Tozawa
- Succeeded by: Masanobu Hozumi

Member of the Gunma Prefectural Assembly
- In office 1983–1993

Member of the Ōta City Council
- In office 1979–1983

Personal details
- Born: 7 December 1941 (age 84) Ōta, Gunma, Japan
- Party: Independent
- Other political affiliations: LDP (1983–1993); JNP (1983)
- Education: Keio University

Masayoshi Shimizu (清水 聖義, Shimizu Masayoshi; born 7 December 1941) is a Japanese politician who served as the mayor of Ōta, Gunma, Japan from 1995 to 2025. As of 1 July 2010, he is also the chairman of the Gunma Kokusai Academy school in Ōta.
