= Yuki Saito (pitcher, born 1988) =

Japanese baseball player

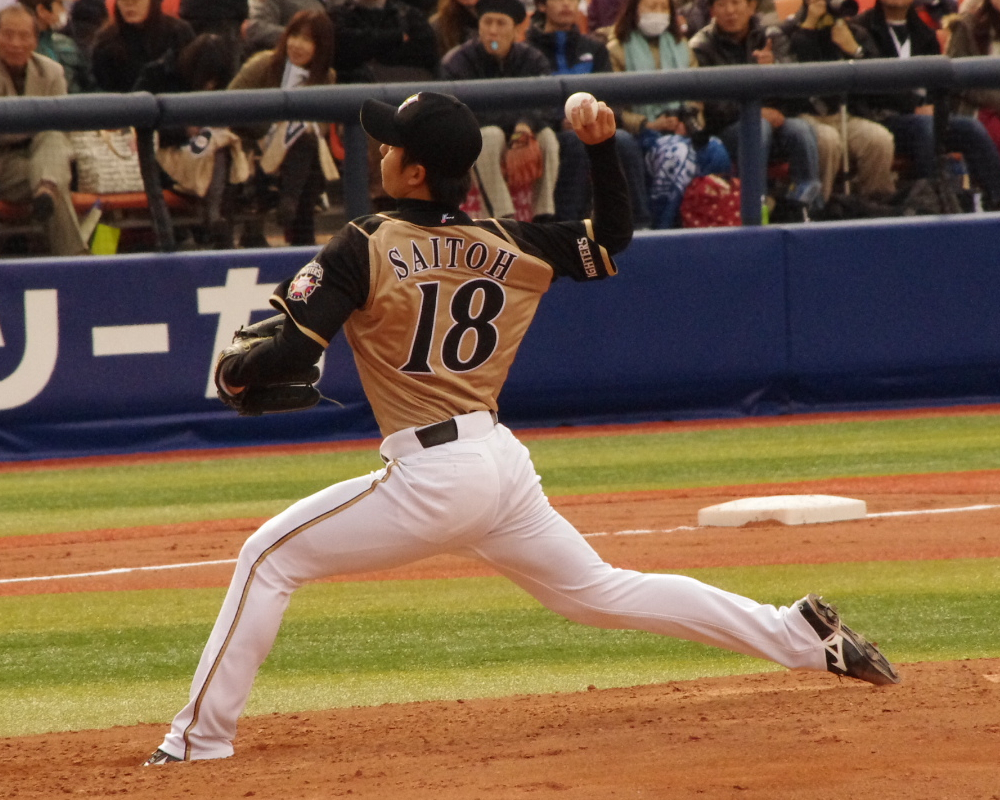
- Saito with the Hokkaido Nippon Ham Fighters
- Starting pitcher
- Born: June 6, 1988 (age 38); Nitta (part of the special city of Ōta), Gunma, Japan
- Batted: Right Threw: Right

NPB debut
- April 17, 2011, for the Hokkaido Nippon-Ham Fighters

Last NPB appearance
- October 16, 2021, for the Hokkaido Nippon-Ham Fighters

NPB statistics
- Win–loss record: 15–26
- Earned run average: 4.34
- Strikeouts: 209
- Stats at Baseball Reference

Teams
- Hokkaido Nippon-Ham Fighters (2011–2021)

Career highlights and awards
- Collegiate baseball: Three-time Best Nine Award winner (Spring/Fall 2007, Fall 2008); 56th All-Japan University Baseball Championship Series Most Valuable Player (2007); NPB: 2× NPB All-Star (2011, 2012)

Yuki Saito (斎藤 佑樹, Saitō Yūki; born June 6, 1988) is a Japanese former professional baseball pitcher. He played 11 seasons in Nippon Professional Baseball (NPB) for the Hokkaido Nippon-Ham Fighters.

Saito rose to national stardom as a senior for Waseda Jitsugyo High School when he led the team to a title in the 88th National High School Baseball Championship in 2006. He was given the nickname The Handkerchief Prince (ハンカチ王子, Hankachi Ōji) by the Japanese media for his use of a handkerchief to wipe sweat from his face while on the mound and is also often referred to as Yū-chan (佑ちゃん, Yū-chan).

== Early life ==
Saito was born in Nitta, a town in Gunma Prefecture that has since been incorporated into the larger city of Ōta. He began playing baseball in the first grade, following in the footsteps of his older brother, who as team captain would later lead Kiryū High School to the semi-finals of the regional Gunma Tournament of the National High School Baseball Championship.

Saito's desire to play in the national baseball tournaments held at Koshien Stadium was sparked when he went to the stadium to see Kiryu Commercial High School, the Gunma champions, play in the summer tournament in 2002. He considered enrolling in Kiryu High School like his brother, but opted to apply at a school with a stronger baseball reputation so that he could play at a higher level.

== High school career ==
In 2004, Saito left his home in Gunma to attend Waseda Jitsugyo High School, a private affiliate school of Waseda University, choosing to live in Tokyo with his brother. He earned a spot on the team's bench in his first year and was assigned the uniform number "1" (which denotes a high school team's ace pitcher in Japan) by the summer of his second. However, while he managed to take his team to the semi-finals of the West Tokyo Tournament that summer, he gave up three home runs in the match against Nihon University Third Senior High School in a humiliating mercy-rule loss.

Saito's team faced Nihon University Third High again just months later in the semi-finals of the regional tournament held that fall. This time, Saito pitched a complete game shutout and went on to win in the finals as well. That November, he led his team to the semi-finals of the 36th Meiji Jingu Tournament, securing Waseda Jitsugyo High a berth in the 78th National High School Baseball Invitational Tournament that would be held the following spring.

In the spring of 2006, pitching in a national tournament for the first time, Saito took the mound against Kanzei High School of Okayama, going the distance in a grueling match that ended in a tie after fifteen innings as per tournament regulations as well as the rematch that ensued the very next day, eventually leading his team to the win (though it lost to Yokohama Senior High School in the quarter-finals).

=== National championship ===
That summer, he faced Nihon University Third High yet again in the finals of the West Tokyo Tournament, defeating them in extra innings to earn a spot in the 88th National High School Baseball Championship in 2006. Saito started and held the opposing team to under three runs in every game in the national tournament, even contributing with his bat by hitting a home run in the third-round match against Fukui Commercial High School and leading the school to their first appearance in the national championship finals in 26 years.

The finals against Komazawa University Tomakomai High School (the South Hokkaido champions) became a classic pitchers' duel between Saito and Tomakomai High's ace pitcher Masahiro Tanaka. The game remained tied 1–1 after fifteen innings, resulting in the first rematch in the tournament finals since Matsuyama Commercial High School and Misawa High School met in 1969. Saito insisted on starting in the rematch that took place the next day, holding Tomakomai High to three runs and striking out Tanaka, the final batter, to bring Waseda Jitsugyo High the school's first-ever national championship.

The 69 innings and 948 total pitches that Saito threw were the most in tournament history (he pitched 42 innings in the last four days alone). The 78 strikeouts he recorded were second only to then-Tokushima Commercial High School ace Eiji Bando's 83 in 1958.

=== The Handkerchief Prince ===
At the tournament, various media outlets took a strong liking to Saito's custom of using a blue handkerchief that he kept folded in his pocket to wipe sweat from his face. This, combined with his good looks, led to his being dubbed the "Handkerchief Prince" (ハンカチ王子, Hankachi Ōji).

Later, the name "Yū-chan" (佑ちゃん, Yū-chan) stuck after Masahiro Tanaka told media that that was what he called Saito during the U.S.-Japan High School Baseball Tournament that was held following the national championship. (Saito and Tanaka were both chosen to play for the Japanese team in the tournament, organized by the Japanese Educational Resource Center in conjunction with the Major League Baseball Urban Youth Academy.) The suffix "-chan" is often attached to names to express affection for that person in Japanese; the nickname is similar in nature to Tanaka's own nickname, "Mā-kun" (マー君, Mā-kun).

=== Aftermath of tournament ===
Though it had been reported even prior to the tournament that Saito planned on proceeding to college upon completing high school rather than declaring for the Nippon Professional Baseball draft that would be held in the fall, his sensational performance and sudden popularity caused much speculation regarding his decision (particularly by the media). On September 11, he held a press conference in front of more than 150 reporters and announced that he would not be declaring for the draft, opting to go to college instead.

In the Nojigiku Hyōgo National Sports Festival, the final tournament of his high school career, Saito faced Tomakomai High in the finals in a rematch of the national championship held in the summer, pitching a complete-game shutout and defeating them one last time.

== College career ==
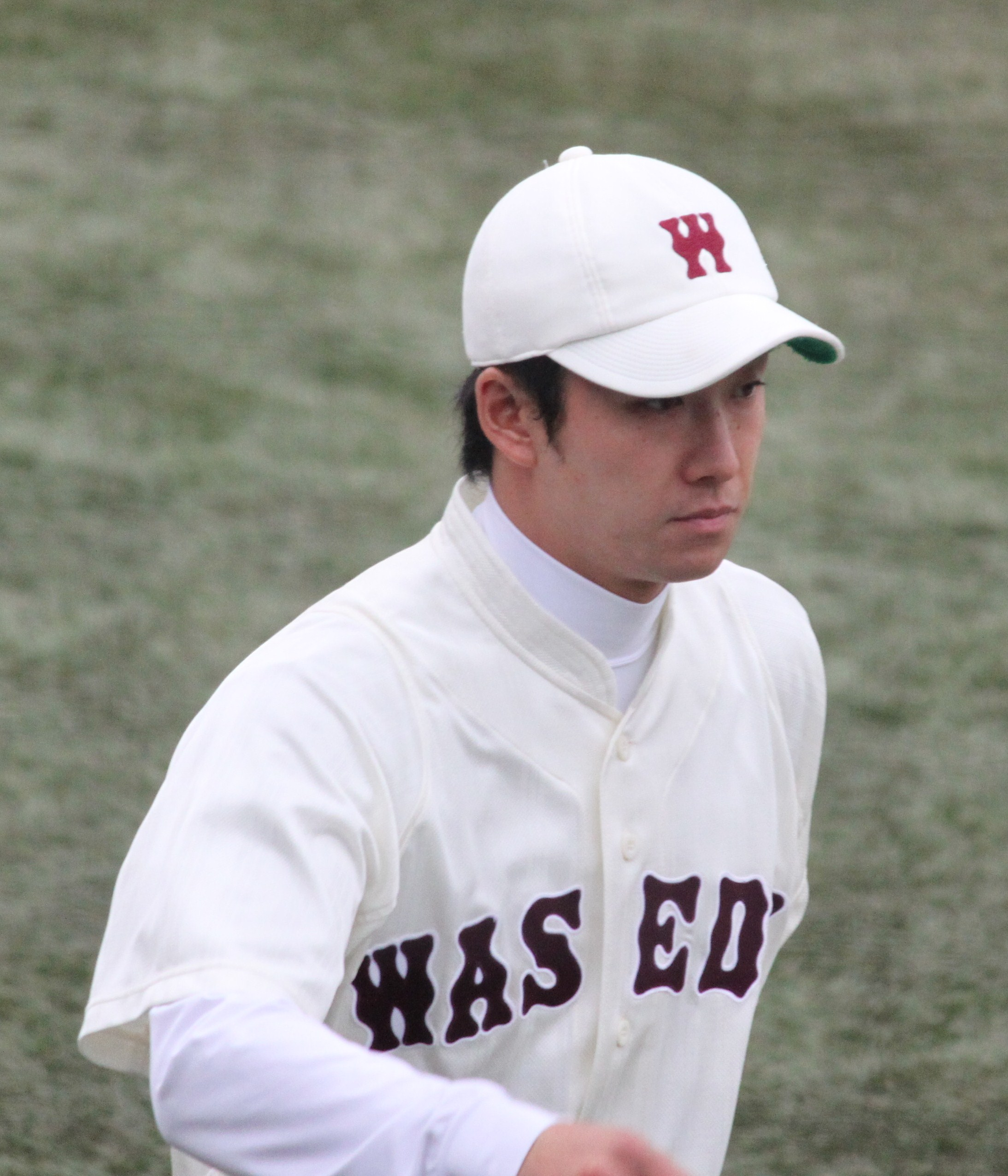
Saito in 2010

=== 2007 ===
In 2007, Saito enrolled in Waseda University as a sociology major, pitching in the opener of the spring season of the Tokyo Big6 Baseball League against the University of Tokyo on April 14. He threw six shutout innings, striking out eight and allowing just one hit and earning the first win of his college career. He earned the trust of head coach Atsuyoshi Otake and was sent to the mound in the crucial second game of series several times, including the pivotal game against arch-rival Keio University on June 3 that clinched their second consecutive league title. Saito finished the season with a 4-0 record and a 1.65 ERA, starting four games and closing out two others in situations that would be recorded as saves in professional leagues (there are no official saves in the Tokyo Big6 Baseball League). He was chosen to the league's Best Nine, the first time a freshman pitcher had ever won the award in the spring season, and was also named the league Most Valuable Player in online fan voting.

That June, Saito took the mound as Waseda's ace in the second-round match, semi-finals, and finals of the 56th All-Japan University Baseball Championship Series, earning wins in the latter two games and leading the school to their first national championship in 33 years. Saito was also named the tournament MVP for his efforts.

A month later, in July 2007, Saito was chosen to play for Japan in the 36th Japan-USA University Baseball Championship Series. He started in Game 3 of the series and came away with the win, becoming the first freshman to play for Japan to earn a win in the history of the tournament. However, he could not find his location in Game 5 after coming on in relief, ultimately being charged with the loss. After the game, he commented to the American media, "There's a part of me that would like to play in the majors after experiencing professional baseball in Japan once."

Saito took the mound for the fall season opener as well, becoming the first pitcher in 80 years to start and win the opener of both the spring and fall seasons as a freshman (then-Keio pitcher Saburo Miyatake accomplished the feat in 1927). He pitched the first complete game of his college career in the fourth game against Hosei University on September 25 and topped the effort with a 15-strikeout (a personal high) complete-game shutout in the rubber game against Keio on October 30, becoming the winning pitcher in the title-clinching game for Waseda for the second consecutive season. He finished the season with a 4–0 record and an 0.78 ERA in 57 2/3 innings, leading the league in wins and ERA and winning both the Best Nine and Most Valuable Player (as chosen by the fans) awards a second time.

In the 38th Meiji Jingu Tournament that followed, he started all three games, leading Waseda to a match-up with Toyo University in the tournament finals on November 14. However, though he pitched six shutout frames and matched Toyo's ace (and current Fukuoka SoftBank Hawks pitcher) Shota Ohba inning for inning, the bullpen gave up the go-ahead run after Saito left the game and Waseda fell just short of the tournament championship.

=== 2008 ===
Going into the spring 2008 season, Saito vowed to win five games and lead to Waseda to a fourth consecutive league title. However, the spring season turned out to be a frustrating experience for Saito. In a May 19 start against Meiji University, Saito was hit in the right thigh by a sharp come-backer (a line drive right back to the pitcher), forcing him to leave the game. Waseda went on to lose the game (the loss being charged to Saito), diminishing their chances of winning the league title. In his next game against Keio on June 1, Saito gave up two home runs, losing consecutive starts for the first time in his college career. It was also the first time he gave up multiple home runs in a game since the National High School Baseball Championship finals in 2006. Saito finished the season at just 3–2, relinquishing Waseda's stronghold on the league title to Meiji.

Saito spent much of the summer overseas, playing in the IBAF World University Baseball Championship in the Czech Republic and taking part in a tour of Brazil with the rest of the Waseda team. He placed a greater emphasis on running in his workouts.

Just how effective Saito's effort to build stamina during the summer would be quickly became evident during the fall season. In one particular stretch from October 11 to October 20, Saito started five of the seven games Waseda played against Hosei and Meiji, going 3-1 and throwing 525 pitches in a 10-day span. Saito held Keio to one run over seven innings in the title clincher on November 1, marking already the third time in his college career that he had pitched in a title-clinching game. He followed the performance up with another win over Keio two days later, finishing the season with a league-leading (and personal-best) 7–1 record and notching at least one win against each of the five other teams in the league (Tokyo, Hosei, Meiji, Keio, and Rikkio), earning him his third selection to the Best Nine Award.

=== 2009 ===
Saito started the spring 2009 season off well, pitching seven shutout innings while striking out 10 and allowing just three hits in a resounding 11–0 victory over the University of Tokyo in the season opener held April 11. However, he had one of the worst outings of his career against Hosei University on April 28, lasting just four innings and giving up six runs (the most in his college career thus far) on six hits, three walks and three hit-batters en route to an 8–4 loss. He rebounded with a stellar outing against Rikkio on May 2, striking out 12 and allowing just two hits over eight shutout innings in a 3–0 victory.

== Professional career ==
On October 28, 2010, Saito was drafted by the Hokkaido Nippon-Ham Fighters in the 2010 Nippon Professional Baseball draft. Saito made his NPB debut on April 17, 2011, for the Hokkaido Nippon-Ham Fighters. On September 30, 2021, Saito announced he would be retiring from professional baseball after 11 years with the Fighters.

== Pitching style ==
Saito is a right-handed pitcher with a compact overhand delivery. He can locate his pitches to both sides of the plate, throwing an average four-seam fastball that usually sits 138 to 145 km/h (86 to 90 mph) and tops out at 150 km/h (93 mph) but complementing it with a two-seam fastball sits 135 to 142 km/h (84 to 88 mph) as well as a wide assortment of offspeed pitches. His go-to pitches are a tight slider with late movement and a forkball, but he also been known to throw a curveball and changeup. Saito has said that he is trying a new grip on his changeup for the Spring 2009 season and that increasing the velocity of his fastball has been one of his ongoing goals.

Despite having a somewhat small frame at 176 cm (5 ft 9 in) and 76 kg (168 lb), Saito has excellent stamina, throwing 231 pitches in the second-round match against Kanzei High School in the National High School Baseball Invitational Tournament, 221 pitches in the finals of the West Tokyo Tournament, and 178 in the finals of the National High School Baseball Championship in his senior year of high school.

Saito was dubbed "the second coming of Daisuke Araki" during his high school years (particularly before he won the national championship and became more associated with his other nicknames) for the similarities in their playing styles. Araki, a fellow alumnus of Waseda Jitsugyo High, pitched in five consecutive national tournaments during his high school career before going on to play for the Yakult Swallows and Yokohama BayStars.

== Post-retirement ==
Following his retirement from active play, Saito began the second chapter of his career as a businessman. He has been serving as the Chief Information Officer (CIO) of Livedoor since 2024. Additionally, he serves as a news anchor for the Monday and Tuesday broadcasts of Nippon TV's news program "news every". Rather than focusing on sports, he covers general news.
