= Toshiro Ino =

Japanese politician (born 1980)

- 井野 俊郎
- Official portrait, 2022

Member of the House of Representatives
- Incumbent
- Assumed office 16 December 2012
- Preceded by: Takashi Ishizeki
- Constituency: Gunma 2nd

Member of the Isesaki City Council
- In office 2010–2012

Personal details
- Born: 8 January 1980 (age 46) Isesaki, Gunma, Japan
- Party: Liberal Democratic
- Children: 2
- Education: Meiji University

Toshiro Ino (井野俊郎, Ino Toshiro; born 8 January 1980) is a Japanese politician serving as a member of the House of Representatives since 2012. From 2010 to 2012, he was a city councillor of Isesaki.
