= GKA =

GKA may refer to:

- Goa Konkani Akademi, Goa, India
- Goroka Airport, Goroka, Papua New Guinea
- Gunma Kokusai Academy, Japan
- Guya language
- Portishead Radio, a defunct English radio station
