= Tsutomu Takebe =

Japanese politician

- 武部 勤
- Official portrait, 2001

Secretary-General of the Liberal Democratic Party
- In office September 2004 – September 2006
- President: Junichiro Koizumi
- Preceded by: Shinzo Abe
- Succeeded by: Hidenao Nakagawa

Minister of Agriculture, Forestry and Fisheries
- In office 26 April 2001 – 30 September 2002
- Prime Minister: Junichiro Koizumi
- Preceded by: Yoshio Yatsu
- Succeeded by: Tadamori Oshima

Member of the House of Representatives
- In office 7 July 1986 – 16 November 2012
- Preceded by: Takurō Shimada
- Succeeded by: Multi-member district
- Constituency: Hokkaido 5th (1986–1996); Hokkaido 12th (1996–2009); Hokkaido PR (2009–2012)

Member of the Hokkaido Prefectural Assembly
- In office 30 April 1971 – 2 December 1983
- Constituency: Abashiri City

Personal details
- Born: 1 May 1941 (age 85) Shari, Hokkaido, Japan
- Party: Liberal Democratic
- Children: Arata Takebe
- Education: Waseda University

Tsutomu Takebe (武部 勤, Takebe Tsutomu; born 1 May 1941 in Shari, Hokkaidō) is a Japanese politician who served as secretary general of Japan's Liberal Democratic Party from 2004 to 2006. He was succeeded by Hidenao Nakagawa.

House of Representatives (Japan)
Preceded by Akira Amari	Chair, Lower House Committee on Commerce and Industry; 1996–1997	Succeeded by Toshitsugu Saito
Preceded by Seiken Sugiura	Chair, Lower House Committee on Judicial Affairs; 1999–2000	Succeeded by Jinen Nagase
Preceded by Yoshinori Ohno	Chair, Lower House Committee on Rules and Administration; 2003–2004	Succeeded by Jirō Kawasaki
Political offices
Preceded by Yoshio Yatsu	Minister of Agriculture, Forestry and Fisheries; 2001–2002	Succeeded by Tadamori Oshima
Party political offices
Preceded by Shinzō Abe	Secretary-General of the Liberal Democratic Party; 2004–2006	Succeeded by Hidenao Nakagawa
