= Hiroyoshi Sasagawa =

Japanese politician

- 笹川 博義
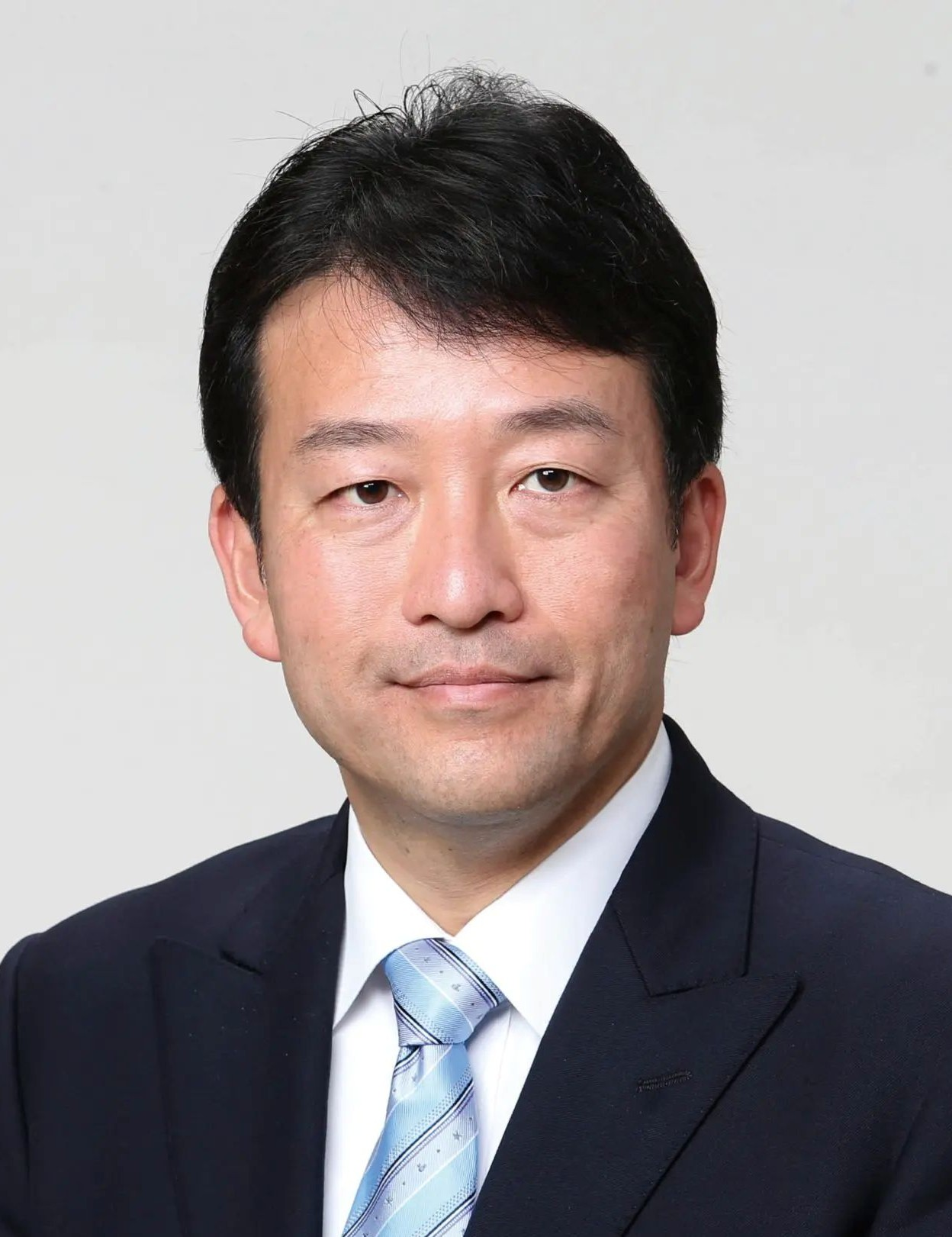
- Official portrait, 2017

Minister of the Environment
- Incumbent
- Assumed office 17 September 2026
- Prime Minister: Sanae Takaichi
- Preceded by: Hirotaka Ishihara

Member of the House of Representatives
- Incumbent
- Assumed office 16 December 2012
- Preceded by: Masaaki Kakinuma
- Constituency: Gunma 3rd

Member of the Gunma Prefectural Assembly
- In office 2007 – 19 November 2012
- Constituency: Ōta City

Personal details
- Born: 29 August 1966 (age 60) Tokyo, Japan
- Party: Liberal Democratic
- Other political affiliations: New Frontier (1996)
- Children: 3
- Parent: Takashi Sasagawa (father)
- Relatives: Ryōichi Sasakawa (grandfather); Yōhei Sasakawa (uncle)
- Education: Meiji University

Hiroyoshi Sasakawa (born 29 August 1966) is a Japanese politician and businessman. He is the member of the House of Representatives for Gunma 3rd district belonging to the Liberal Democratic Party.

In the 2026 Japanese general election, Sasakawa was reelected for his sixth term by a large margin (96,283 votes against his opponent's 60,204). This represented an improvement from his performance in the 2024 election when he won reelection to his fifth term by only 214 votes.
