= Jitsuo Inagaki =

Japanese politician (1928–2009)

- 稲垣 実男
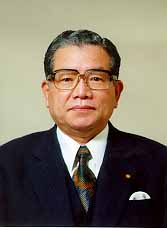
- Official portrait, 1996

Director-General of the Hokkaido Development Agency
- In office 7 November 1996 – 11 September 1997
- Prime Minister: Ryutaro Hashimoto
- Preceded by: Saburō Okabe
- Succeeded by: Muneo Suzuki

Director-General of the Okinawa Development Agency
- In office 7 November 1996 – 11 September 1997
- Prime Minister: Ryutaro Hashimoto
- Preceded by: Saburō Okabe
- Succeeded by: Muneo Suzuki

Member of the House of Representatives
- In office 18 July 1993 – 2 June 2000
- Preceded by: Seiken Sugiura
- Succeeded by: Multi-member district
- Constituency: Aichi 4th (1993–1996); Tōkai PR (1996–2000)
- In office 21 January 1977 – 24 January 1990
- Preceded by: Sachio Urano
- Succeeded by: Minoru Kawashima
- Constituency: Aichi 4th

Personal details
- Born: 28 March 1928 Isshiki, Aichi, Japan
- Died: 5 March 2009 (aged 80) Shinjuku, Tokyo, Japan
- Party: Liberal Democratic
- Education: Waseda University

Jitsuo Inagaki (稲垣 実男, Inagaki Jitsuo; March 28, 1928 – March 5, 2009) was a Japanese politician and cabinet member.

Inagaki was elected to his first term in the Japanese House of Representatives in 1977. In 1984, he was part of the Liberal Democratic Party and served on the Social Security System Consultative Council as an SLAC board member. From 1984 to 1985, Inagaki also joined the Diet's Public Pensions Research Subcommittee as a member. He joined the cabinet under former Prime Minister Ryutaro Hashimoto during the 1990s, where he served as the head of the Hokkaidō and Okinawa development agencies.

Inagaki largely retired from politics after he was defeated for re-election in 2000. He was arrested in 2004 and charged with violating an investment law concerning his company for which he was convicted. He was sentenced to two years in prison, suspended for five years, beginning in 2005.

Jitsuo Inagaki died at his home in Tokyo of a natural illness at the age of 80.
