= Yamaguchi 1st district =

Legislative district of Japan

Yamaguchi 1st District
- Parliamentary constituency for the Japanese House of Representatives
- Numbered map of Yamaguchi Prefecture single-member districts
- Prefecture: Yamaguchi
- Proportional District: Chūgoku
- Electorate: 362,270 (2017)
- Major settlements: Yamaguchi, Ube, and Hōfu

Current constituency
- Created: 1994
- Party: LDP
- Representative: Masahiro Kōmura

Yamaguchi 1st district (山口[県第]1区, Yamaguchi[-ken dai-]ikku) is a single-member electoral district for the House of Representatives, the lower house of the National Diet of Japan. It is located in Yamaguchi and covers the prefectural capital Yamaguchi and the cities of Hōfu and Ube. In September 2023 the district had 388,682 eligible voters. In 2012 they were 359,151.

Before the electoral reform of the 1990s, the area had been part of the five-member Yamaguchi 2nd district which covered roughly the Eastern half of the prefecture and had been the former district of LDP presidents Nobusuke Kishi and Eisaku Satō. Another representative from the pre-reform 2nd district for the LDP was former four-term Tokuyama city mayor Sakahiko Kōmura. When Kōmura retired, his fourth son Masahiko won a seat in the district in 1980 and defended it in all pre-reform elections. After the electoral reform, Masahiko Kōmura took over the new single-member 1st district for the LDP. The main opposition NFP and the newly founded DPJ did not even nominate candidates in the first post-reform election of 1996, his only challengers were a Communist and an unaffiliated independent. In subsequent elections, the enlarged/"New" DPJ did nominate candidates; but Kōmura held onto the seat by large margins, even in the countrywide DPJ victory of 2009. The district remains – like two other of Yamaguchi's districts – an unbroken "conservative kingdom" (hoshu ōkoku). In the 2017 election Masahiko Kōmura retired, his eldest son Masahiro extended the streak with a two-thirds majority in his first election.

Kōmura was a minister in several cabinets in the 1990s and 2000s (Murayama, Obuchi, Mori II, Fukuda, Abe I). From 2000 to 2012, Kōmura led the Banchō Seisaku Kenkyūjo (previously Kōmoto faction, now Ōshima faction), one of the smaller, but well-established factions of the LDP that traces its roots to the centrist Reform Party and the pre-war Constitutional Democratic Party. In 2012, LDP president Shinzō Abe (Machimura faction, also from Yamaguchi) nominated him to succeed fellow faction member Tadamori Ōshima as vice president of the party.

== List of representatives ==
Representative	Election	Party	Notes
Masahiko Kōmura	1996	Liberal Democratic Party	
Masahiko Kōmura	2000	Liberal Democratic Party	
Masahiko Kōmura	2003	Liberal Democratic Party	
Masahiko Kōmura	2005	Liberal Democratic Party	
Masahiko Kōmura	2009	Liberal Democratic Party	
Masahiko Kōmura	2012	Liberal Democratic Party	
Masahiko Kōmura	2014	Liberal Democratic Party	
Masahiro Kōmura	2017	Liberal Democratic Party	
Masahiro Kōmura	2021	Liberal Democratic Party	
Masahiro Kōmura	2024	Liberal Democratic Party	
Masahiro Kōmura	2026	Liberal Democratic Party	

== Recent results ==
2026
Party	Candidate	Votes	%	±%
LDP	Masahiro Kōmura	124,364	63.5	▼9.2
Centrist Reform	Kiyoshi Noda	39,108	20.0	▼1.9
Sanseitō	Tamae Yamasaki	32,352	16.5	
Turnout		195,824	54.23	▲5.19
LDP hold				

2024
Party	Candidate	Votes	%	±%
LDP	Masahiro Kōmura	99,644	54.3	▼15.8
CDP	Fumiko Sakamoto	40,237	21.9	▼8.0
DPP	Kiyoshi Noda	31,710	17.3	
JCP	Michiko Mifuji	11,79	6.4	
Turnout			49.04	▲0.54
LDP hold				

2021
Party	Candidate	Votes	%	±%
LDP	Masahiro Kōmura	118,882	70.1	▲1.0
CDP	Kazuya Ouchi	50,684	29.9	▲10.9
Turnout			48.50	▼5.93
LDP hold				

2017
Party	Candidate	Votes	%	±%
LDP - Kōmeitō	Masahiro Kōmura	133,221	69.1	
Kibo	Kazuya Ouchi	36,582	19.0	
JCP	Hiroshi Goto	17,924	9.3	
HRP	Miwako Kawai	5,070	2.6	
Turnout		197,192	54.43	

2014
Party	Candidate	Votes	%	±%
LDP	Masahiko Kōmura	120,084	68.1	▲2.2
Ishin	Tsutomu Nakamura	39,375	22.3	
JCP	Naoko Fujii	16,890	9.6	▲4.8
Turnout			50.63	▼7.51
LDP hold				

2012
Party	Candidate	Votes	%	±%
LDP (NK)	Masahiko Kōmura	133,776	65.9	+8.9
TPJ (NPD)	Tetsunari Iida	35,622	17.6	new
DPJ	Satoshi Tomimura	23,813	11.7	new
JCP	Tomiyuki Uonaga	9,753	4.8	new

2009
Party	Candidate	Votes	%	±%
LDP	Masahiko Kōmura	142,103 (Note: Decimals from anbunhyō omitted)	57.0	−6.8
DPJ	Tsutomu Takamura	94,253	37.8	new
JCP	Sadayoshi Yoshida	10,114	4.1	new
HRP	Jun'ichi Murata	2,889	1.2	new
