= Azuma, Gunma (Seta) =

Azuma 東村
- Former village
- Flag Emblem

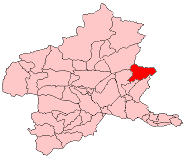
- Location of Azuma in Gunma Prefecture

- Location in Japan
- Coordinates: 36°31′20″N 139°18′35″E
- Country: Japan
- Region: Kantō
- Prefecture: Gunma Prefecture
- District: Seta
- Merged: March 27, 2006 (now part of Midori)

Area
  - Total: 141.57 km^{2} (54.66 sq mi)

Population (March 1, 2006)
  - Total: 2,917
  - Density: 20.6/km^{2} (53/sq mi)
- Time zone: UTC+09:00 (JST)
- Symbols
- Bird: green pheasant
- Flower: chrysanthemum × morifolium, rhododendron subg. Hymenanthes
- Tree: cryptomeria

Azuma (東村, Azuma-mura) was a village located in Seta District, Gunma Prefecture, Japan. It was one of three separate villages named Azuma ("East Village") within Gunma Prefecture.

As of 2003, the village had an estimated population of 3,036 and a density of 21.45 persons per km^{2}. The total area was 141.57 km^{2}. The village was established in 1889.

On March 27, 2006, Azuma, along with the town of Ōmama (from Yamada District), and the town of Kasakake (from Nitta District), was merged to create the city of Midori.
