= Masahiko Kōmura =

Japanese politician (born 1942)

- 高村 正彦
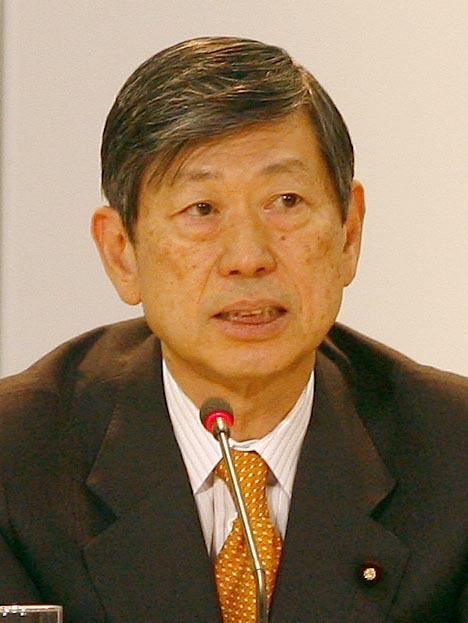
- Kōmura in 2008

Vice President of the Liberal Democratic Party
- In office September 2012 – October 2018
- President: Shinzo Abe
- Secretary-General: Shigeru Ishiba; Sadakazu Tanigaki; Toshihiro Nikai
- Preceded by: Tadamori Ōshima
- Succeeded by: Tarō Asō (2021)

Minister for Foreign Affairs
- In office 26 September 2007 – 24 September 2008
- Prime Minister: Yasuo Fukuda
- Preceded by: Nobutaka Machimura
- Succeeded by: Hirofumi Nakasone
- In office 30 July 1998 – 5 October 1999
- Prime Minister: Keizō Obuchi
- Preceded by: Keizō Obuchi
- Succeeded by: Yōhei Kōno

Minister of Defense
- In office 27 August 2007 – 26 September 2007
- Prime Minister: Shinzō Abe
- Preceded by: Yuriko Koike
- Succeeded by: Shigeru Ishiba

Minister of Justice
- In office 5 December 2000 – 26 April 2001
- Prime Minister: Yoshirō Mori
- Preceded by: Okiharu Yasuoka
- Succeeded by: Mayumi Moriyama

Director-General of the Economic Planning Agency
- In office 30 June 1994 – 8 August 1995
- Prime Minister: Tomiichi Murayama
- Preceded by: Yoshio Terazawa
- Succeeded by: Isamu Miyazaki

Member of the House of Representatives; from Yamaguchi
- In office 23 June 1980 – 28 September 2017
- Preceded by: Mitsuteru Yoshii
- Succeeded by: Masahiro Kōmura
- Constituency: 2nd district (1980–1996); 1st district (1996–2017)

Personal details
- Born: 15 March 1942 (age 84) Shūnan, Yamaguchi, Japan
- Party: Liberal Democratic
- Children: Masahiro Kōmura
- Parent: Sakahiko Kōmura (father)
- Education: Chuo University

Masahiko Kōmura (高村 正彦, Kōmura Masahiko; born 15 March 1942) is a Japanese politician who served as Vice President of the Liberal Democratic Party from 2012 to 2018. He served in several cabinet position, including as Minister for Foreign Affairs from 1998 to 1999 and again from 2007 to 2008. He was a member of the House of Representatives from 1980 to 2017.

== Early life and education ==
Kōmura was born in Ehime Prefecture on 15 March 1942. He graduated from Chuo University's faculty of law.

== Career ==
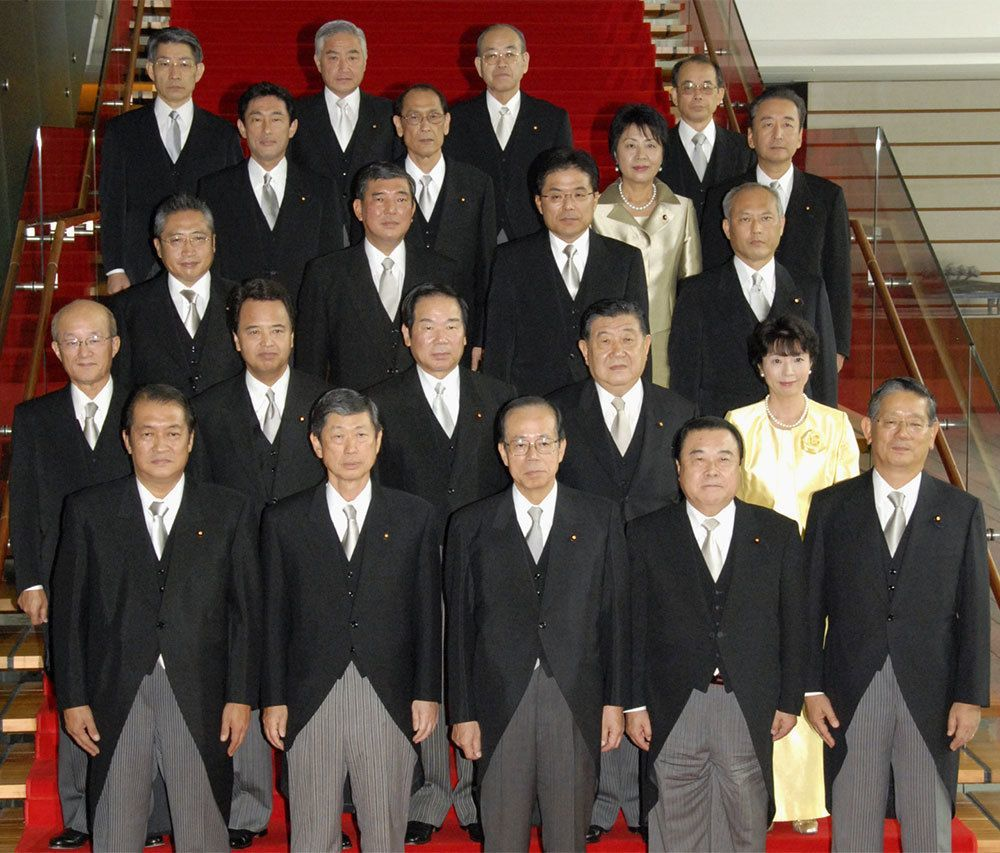
With members of the Yasuo Fukuda Cabinet in September 2007

After graduation, Kōmura passed Japan's bar exam and then immediately entered politics. He was first elected to the House of Representatives in the June 1980 election, and has been re-elected in each election since then. He became Director-General of the Economic Planning Agency (as a Minister of State) in June 1994, Minister for Foreign Affairs in July 1998, and Minister of Justice in December 2000. In August 2007, under Prime Minister Shinzō Abe, he became Minister of Defense. Kōmura leads a small faction of the LDP named after himself and ran for LDP president in 2003, but was defeated by Junichirō Koizumi.

Following Abe's resignation in September 2007, Kōmura became Minister for Foreign Affairs for a second time on 26 September 2007, in the Cabinet of Prime Minister Yasuo Fukuda. He remained in that post until he was replaced by Hirofumi Nakasone in the Cabinet of Tarō Asō, appointed on 24 September 2008. He is vice president of the LDP.

Kōmura is also the President of the Japan-China Friendship Parliamentarians' Union. He is known to have strong ties within China's political circles.

== Bibliography ==
=== Books ===
Year	Title	ISBN	Notes
2015	Senkyo ttena 'ndarou!? 18-Sai kara no Seiji-gaku Nyūmon	ISBN 978-4-569-82785-8	Co-authored with Haruka Shimada

Political offices
Preceded by Nobutaka Machimura	Minister for Foreign Affairs; 2007–2008	Succeeded by Hirofumi Nakasone
Preceded by Yuriko Koike	Minister of Defence; 27 August – 26 September 2007	Succeeded by Shigeru Ishiba
Preceded by Okiharu Yasuoka	Minister of Justice; 2000–2001	Succeeded by Mayumi Moriyama
Preceded by Keizō Obuchi	Minister for Foreign Affairs; 1998–1999	Succeeded by Yōhei Kōno
Preceded by Yoshio Terazawa	Director of Economic Planning Agency of Japan; 1994–1995	Succeeded by Isamu Miyazaki
