= Gunma Shorei Junior College of Welfare =

Private junior college in Ota, Gunma, Japan

Coordinates: 36.291727°N 139.396871°E

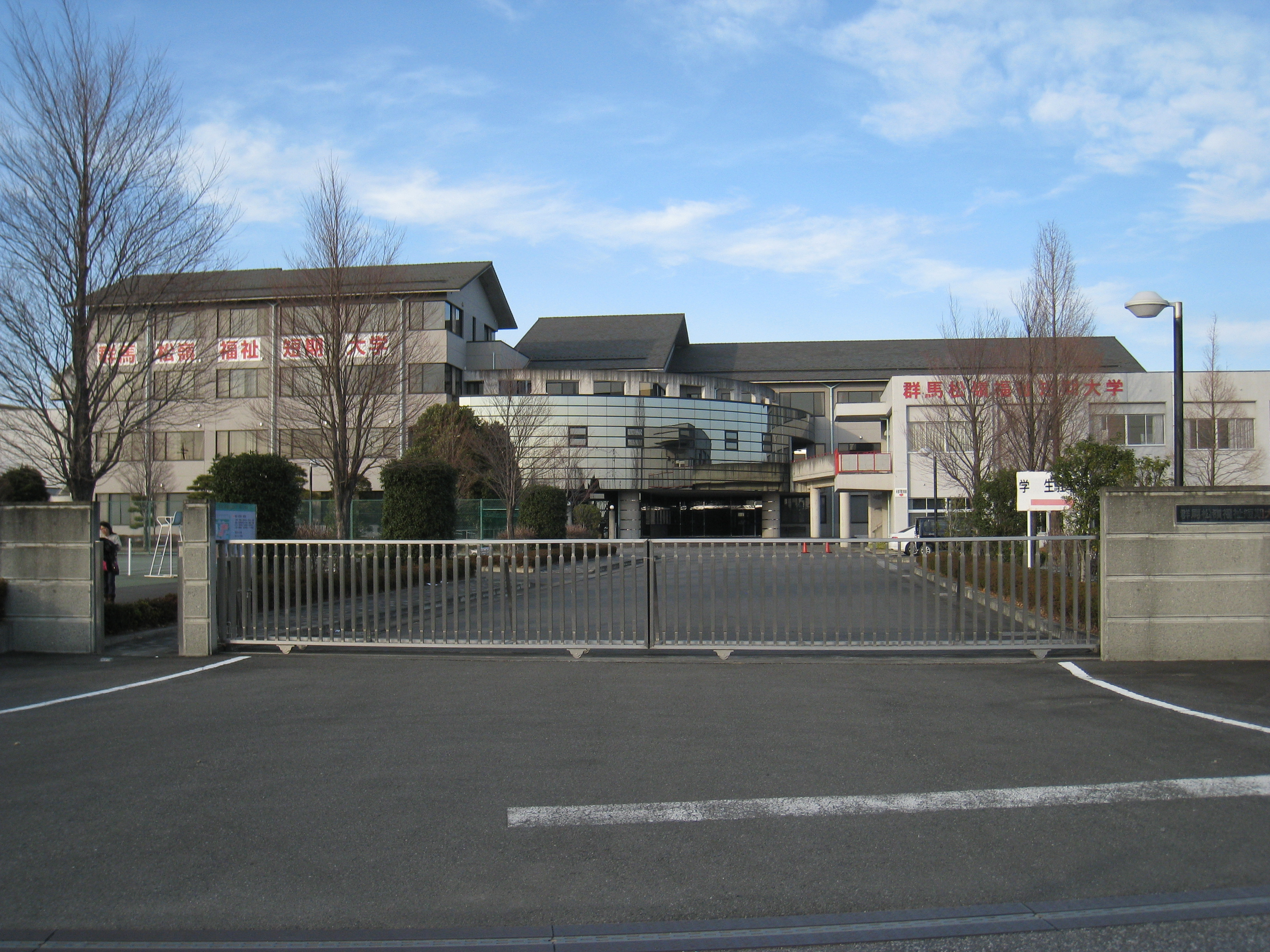
Gunma Shorei Junior College of Welfare, December 2010

Gunma Shorei Junior College of Welfare (群馬松嶺福祉短期大学, Gunma Shōrei Fukushi Tanki Daigaku) was a private junior college in Ota, Gunma, Japan, established in 1999. It closed in fiscal 2011, and the site now forms the secondary school campus of Gunma Kokusai Academy.
