= Seiken Sugiura =

Japanese politician (born 1934)

- 杉浦 正健
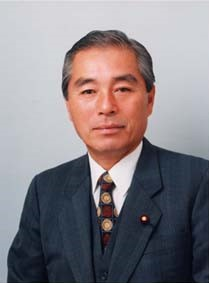
- Official portrait, 2005

Minister of Justice
- In office 31 October 2005 – 26 September 2006
- Prime Minister: Junichiro Koizumi
- Preceded by: Chieko Nōno
- Succeeded by: Jinen Nagase

Deputy Chief Cabinet Secretary (Political affairs, House of Representatives)
- In office 7 May 2004 – 31 October 2005
- Prime Minister: Junichiro Koizumi
- Preceded by: Hiroyuki Hosoda
- Succeeded by: Jinen Nagase

Member of the House of Representatives
- In office 21 October 1996 – 21 July 2009
- Preceded by: Constituency established
- Succeeded by: Yasuhiro Nakane
- Constituency: Aichi 12th
- In office 8 July 1986 – 18 June 1993
- Preceded by: Shirō Nakano
- Succeeded by: Jitsuo Inagaki
- Constituency: Aichi 4th

Personal details
- Born: 26 July 1934 (age 92) Okazaki, Aichi, Japan
- Party: Liberal Democratic
- Education: University of Tokyo

Third Realigned Koizumi Cabinet (2005-10-31)
- Secretary: Shinzō Abe
- Internal Affairs: Heizō Takenaka
- Justice: Seiken Sugiura
- Foreign Affairs: Taro Aso
- Finance: Sadakazu Tanigaki
- Education: Kenji Kosaka
- Health: Jirō Kawasaki
- Agriculture: Shoichi Nakagawa
- Economy: Toshihiro Nikai
- Land: Kazuo Kitagawa
- Environment: Yuriko Koike
- Defense: Fukushiro Nukaga
- Ministers of State: Tetsuo Kutsukake; Kaoru Yosano; Koki Chuma; Iwao Matsuda; Kuniko Inoguchi

Seiken Sugiura (杉浦 正健 Sugiura Seiken, born 26 July 1934) is a Japanese politician and lawyer. He was named Minister of Justice on 31 October 2005 and served in the cabinet of Prime Minister Junichiro Koizumi. Being a Buddhist, he imposed a moratorium on executions during his time as Minister of Justice.

He was defeated in the 2009 election by Yasuhiro Nakane, a member of the Democratic Party of Japan. He has remained engaged in discussions over the death penalty in Japan since leaving politics. On 3 October 2015, he spoke at a World Day against the Death Penalty event in Tokyo, along with Hideo Hiraoka, who was justice minister under the Democratic Party of Japan.

House of Representatives (Japan)
| Preceded by Takashi Sasagawa | Chair, Lower House Committee on Judicial Affairs; 1998–1999 | Succeeded by Tsutomu Takebe |
Political offices
| Preceded by Seishirō Etō, Kiyohiro Araki | State Minister for Foreign Affairs; 2001–2002; Served alongside: Shigeo Uetake | Succeeded by Toshimitsu Motegi, Tetsuro Yano |
| Preceded by Hiroyuki Hosoda | Deputy Chief Cabinet Secretary; 2004–2005 | Succeeded by Jinen Nagase |
| Preceded by Chieko Nōno | Minister of Justice of Japan; 2005–2006 | Succeeded by Jinen Nagase |
