= Masahiro Kōmura =

Japanese politician (born 1970)

- 高村 正大
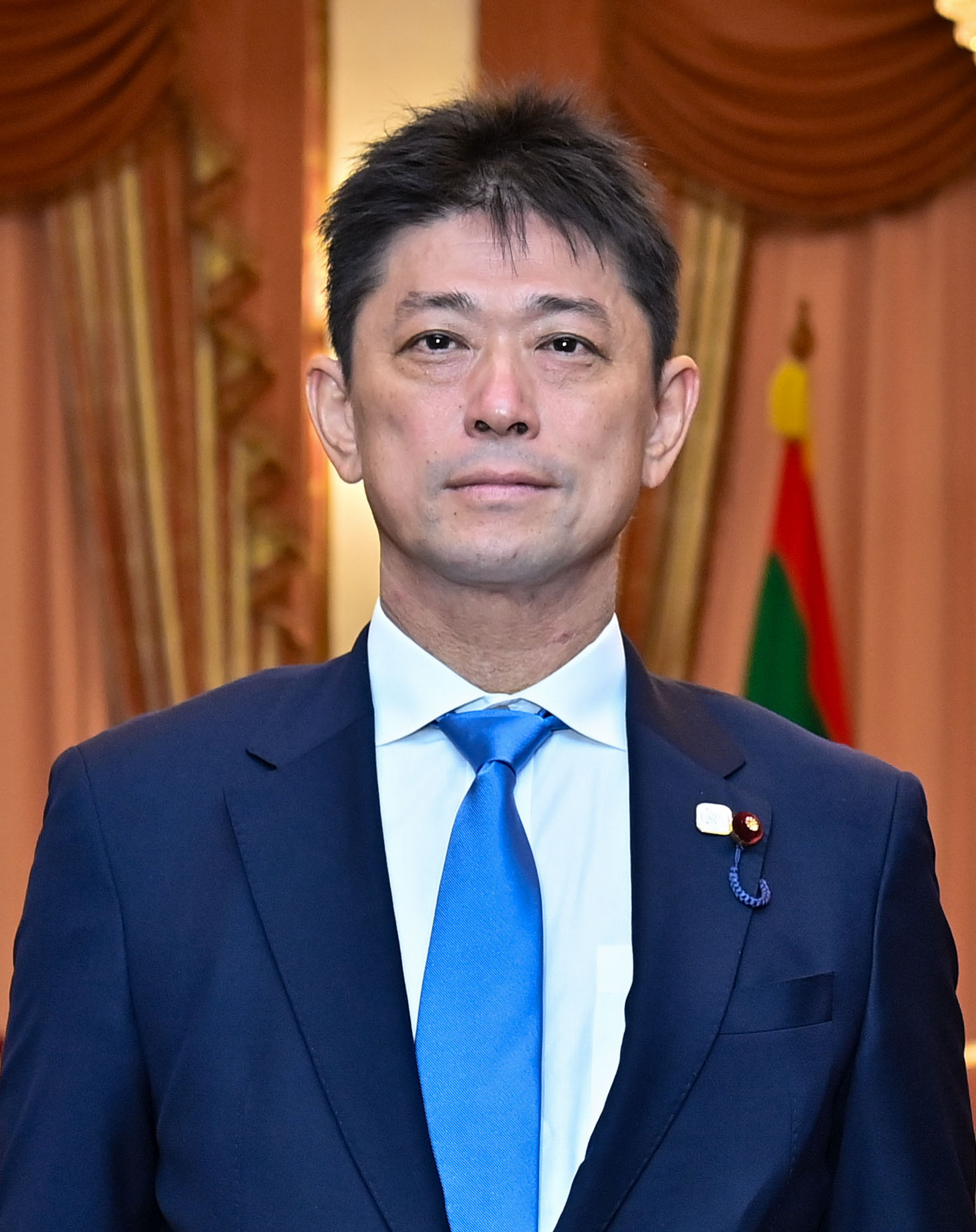
- Kōmura in 2023

Member of the House of Representatives
- Incumbent
- Assumed office 27 October 2017
- Preceded by: Masahiko Kōmura
- Constituency: Yamaguchi 1st

Personal details
- Born: 14 November 1970 (age 55) Hikari, Yamaguchi, Japan
- Party: Liberal Democratic (Shikōkai)
- Parent: Masahiko Kōmura (father)
- Relatives: Sakahiko Kōmura
- Education: Keio University

Masahiro Kōmura (高村正大, Kōmura Masahiro; born 14 November 1970) is a Japanese politician serving as a member of the House of Representatives since 2017. He is the son of Masahiko Kōmura.
