= Kasakake, Gunma =

Former town in Gunma, Japan

Kasakake (笠懸町, Kasakake-machi) was a town located in Nitta District, Gunma Prefecture, Japan.

On March 27, 2006, Kasakake, along with the town of Ōmama (from Yamada District), and the village of Azuma (from Seta District), was merged to create the city of Midori.

The Iwajuku archaeological site is in Kasakake.
