= Omama, Gunma =

Former town in Gunma, Japan

Ōmama (大間々町, Ōmama-machi) was a town located in Yamada District, Gunma Prefecture, Japan.

== Merge ==
On March 27, 2006, Ōmama, along with the town of Kasakake (from Nitta District), and the village of Azuma (from Seta District), was merged to create the city of Midori.
