= Yamada District, Gunma =

Former town in Gunma, Japan

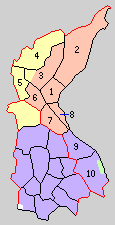
Historic Map of Yamada District: 1. Yamada, 2. Umeda, 3.Kawauchi, 4. Fukuoka, 5. Ōmama, 6. Aioi, 7. Hirosawa, 8. Sakaino, 9. Morita, 11. Nirakawa; orange=Kiryū, yellow=Midori, purple= Ōta, green=to Tochigi Prefecture

Yamada District (山田郡, Yamada-gun) was formerly a rural district located in Gunma Prefecture, Japan. The district is now entirely part of the cities of Kiryū, Midori and Ōta, with a small portion a part of the city of Ashikaga in neighboring Tochigi Prefecture.

== History ==
Yamada District was created on December 7, 1878, with the reorganization of Gunma Prefecture into districts. It included 60 villages, which were formerly part of the tenryō holdings in Kōzuke Province under the direct administration of the Tokugawa shogunate, one town (Kiryu-shinmachi) and one village under the Matsuyama sub-domain of Shōnai Domain in Dewa Province and one village controlled by Jōzai Domain in Kazusa Province. With the establishment of the municipalities system on April 1, 1889, the area was organized into two towns (Kiyru and Ōmama) and eight villages.

== Timeline ==
- 1893: Niragawa village was divided into Yabagawa and Kyuhaku villages.
- March 1, 1921: Kiryū was raised to city status
- April 1, 1933: Kiryū annexes Sakano village
- April 1, 1937: Kiryū annexes Hirosawa village
- April 1, 1940: Niragawa village merged with Ōta town in neighboring Nitta District.
- October 1, 1954: The village of Fukuoka and part of Kawauchi merged with Ōmama, and the villages of Umeda, Aioi and the remainder of Kawauchi merged with Kiryū.
- April 1, 1957: The village of Kyuhaku was absorbed by Ōta city.
- July 1, 1960: The village of Yabagawa was divided between Ōta and Ashikaga, Tochigi.
- December 1, 1963: The village of Morita was annexed by Ōta.
- March 27, 2006, Yamada District was dissolved as the town of Ōmama was merged with the town of Kasakake (from Nitta District), and the village of Azuma (from Seta District) to create the city of Midori.
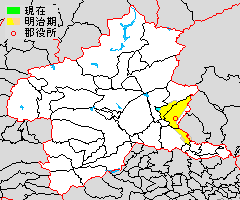
  Map showing location of Yamada District within Gunma Prefecture
