= 2009 Yokohama mayoral election =

The 2009 Yokohama mayoral election was held on August 30, 2009. Fumiko Hayashi, backed by the Democratic Party, won the election.

== Results ==
Mayoral election 2009: Yokohama
Party	Candidate	Votes	%	±%
Independent, Democratic Party	Fumiko Hayashi	910,297	45.85	
Independent, LDP, NKP	Kenji Nakanishi	874,626	44.06	
JCP	Masahiko Okada	200,283	10.09	
Turnout		1,985,206	68.76	

== Sources ==
- Results from JanJan
