= Gunma Kokusai Academy =

Coordinates: 36°17′30.4″N 139°23′49.1″E

- ぐんま国際アカデミー

Location
- 69-1 Nishi-honcho (elementary school); 1361-4 Uchigashima-chō (secondary school); Ōta, Gunma Prefecture, 373-0033 (elementary school); 373-0813 (secondary school); Japan

Information
- Opened: 7 April 2005
- Chairman: Masayoshi Shimizu
- Principal: Teresita-Salve R. Tubianosa (Elementary School); Hiroyuki Kaneko (Secondary School)
- Grades: 1-12
- Gender: Co-educational
- Language: English and Japanese
- Campuses: 2
- Website: www.gka.ed.jp

The Gunma Kokusai Academy (ぐんま国際アカデミー), or GKA, is a private school in Ōta, Gunma, Japan, combining elementary school and secondary school education from grades 1 to 12 with an English language immersion programme. It was designated as a Special Education Zone School by the Koizumi government in 2003. A proportion of classes are conducted in English.

The school opened on 7 April 2005 with a first grade and fourth grade (166 students in total). In 2006, a second and a fifth grade were added to the school. In the following year, a sixth and a third grade were also added. In April 2008, Gunma Kokusai Academy started its first junior high class. In April 2011, the high school started with the junior and senior high school sections moving to a new secondary school campus.

== Campuses ==
=== Elementary school ===
The elementary school for grades 1 to 6 is located at 69-1 Nishi-honcho, Ota. As of January 2013, the principal is Teresita-Salve R. Tubianosa.

The school building, designed by Coelacanth and Associates, won the 2007 JIA Award presented annually by the Japan Institute of Architects.

=== Secondary school ===
The secondary school for grades 7 to 12 is located at 1361-4 Uchigashima-cho, Ota. As of January 2014, the principal is Shizue Yoshida.

The secondary school opened in 2011 on the site of the former Gunma Shorei Junior College of Welfare. With the opening of the new secondary school, the junior high school facilities (grades 7 to 9) were also moved from the original elementary school campus.

== Funding ==
The school was founded using 650 million yen of public funds provided by Ota City. Ota also paid the annual operating fees for the first two years in which private subsidies were not approved for the school by Gunma Prefecture. From fiscal 2007, Gunma Prefecture approved private subsidies, and the city of Ota thus stopped providing funding. The land on which the school was built was initially provided by the city of Ota free of charge, but from fiscal 2008, the school paid an annual lease of approximately 10 million yen.

== School Mottos ==
Knowledge, Creativity, Dignity

== Academic achievements ==
In 2011, three junior high school pupils from GKA achieved TOEIC English proficiency scores of over 900 (out of a maximum of 990).

In 2010, the average TOEIC score for GKA junior high school pupils was 534.8, higher than the average score of 445 for Japanese university students.

== See also ==
- Education in Japan
