= Jinen Nagase =

Japanese politician

Jin'en Nagase
- 長勢 甚遠
- Official portrait, 2005

Minister of Justice
- In office 26 September 2006 – 27 August 2007
- Prime Minister: Shinzo Abe
- Preceded by: Seiken Sugiura
- Succeeded by: Kunio Hatoyama

Deputy Chief Cabinet Secretary (Political affairs, House of Representatives)
- In office 31 October 2005 – 26 September 2006
- Prime Minister: Junichiro Koizumi
- Preceded by: Seiken Sugiura
- Succeeded by: Hakubun Shimomura

Member of the House of Representatives; from Hokuriku-Shin'etsu
- In office 19 February 1990 – 16 November 2012
- Preceded by: Takahisa Tamō
- Succeeded by: Multi-member district
- Constituency: Former Toyama 1st (1990–1996); Toyama 1st (1996–2009); PR block (2009–2012)

Personal details
- Born: 3 October 1943 (age 83) Uozu, Toyama, Japan
- Party: Liberal Democratic
- Education: University of Tokyo

Jinen Nagase (長勢 甚遠, Nagase Jin'en; born 3 October 1943) is a Japanese politician who formerly served as Minister of Justice in the cabinet of Shinzō Abe.

He was born in Toyama and obtained his LL.B. from the University of Tokyo. After graduation, he worked in the Ministry of Labour. He resigned from this position in 1988 and was elected to the Diet of Japan in 1990.

He served as Parliamentary Vice Minister of Health and Welfare under Tomiichi Murayama, as deputy director of the Liberal Democratic Party, as Parliamentary Vice Minister of Labour under Keizō Obuchi and Yoshirō Mori, as Senior Vice Minister of Justice in the second Mori cabinet and as Deputy Chief Cabinet Secretary under Jun'ichirō Koizumi.

He was appointed Minister of Justice on 26 September 2006.

In 2012, he told lobbyists “The people’s sovereignty, basic human rights, and pacifism ― these three things date to the postwar regime imposed by MacArthur on Japan, therefore we have to get rid of them to make the constitution our own!”

Political offices
Preceded by Seiken Sugiura	Minister of Justice of Japan; 2006–2007	Succeeded by Kunio Hatoyama
