= Takashi Sasagawa =

Japanese politician (born 1935)

- 笹川 堯
- Sasagawa in 2008

Member of the House of Representatives
- In office 8 July 1986 – 21 July 2009
- Preceded by: Shirō Hasegawa
- Succeeded by: Takashi Ishizeki
- Constituency: Former Gunma 2nd (1986–1996); Gunma 2nd (1996–2009)

Personal details
- Born: 5 October 1935 (age 90) Bunkyō, Tokyo, Japan
- Party: Liberal Democratic
- Other political affiliations: NFP (1994–1996); Independent (1996–1997)
- Parent: Ryōichi Sasakawa (father)
- Relatives: Yōhei Sasakawa (brother); Hiroyoshi Sasagawa (son)
- Education: Meiji University

Takashi Sasagawa (笹川 堯, Sasagawa Takashi; born 5 October 1935) is a former Japanese politician of the Liberal Democratic Party, who served as a member of the House of Representatives in the Diet (national legislature).

== Early life ==
He is the second son of the businessman, politician and philanthropist Ryōichi Sasakawa. Sasagawa is a native of Bunkyō, Tokyo. He entered Meiji University, but dropped out before graduating.

== Political career ==
Sasagawa was elected for the first time in 1986 after two unsuccessful runs in 1972 and 1983.

In 1993 he left the LDP and participated in the formation of the New Frontier Party in the following year. In 1996 he left the New Frontier Party, rejoining the LDP in the following year.

From 2000 to 2001 he was Minister of State for Science and Technology Policy in the cabinet of Yoshirō Mori.

On September 30, 2008, as LDP General Affairs Council Chairman, Takashi Sasagawa suggested that the US House of Representatives rejected a bailout plan because House Speaker Nancy Pelosi is a woman.
