= Yoshio Yatsu =

Japanese politician (1934–2021)

- 谷津 義男
- Official portrait, 1999

Minister of Agriculture, Forestry and Fisheries
- In office 5 December 2000 – 26 April 2001
- Prime Minister: Yoshirō Mori
- Preceded by: Yoichi Tani
- Succeeded by: Tsutomu Takebe

Member of the House of Representatives
- In office 30 March 1992 – 21 July 2009
- Preceded by: Tōru Sunaga
- Succeeded by: Masaaki Kakinuma
- Constituency: Gunma 2nd (1992–1996); Gunma 3rd (1996–2009)
- In office 8 July 1986 – 24 January 1990
- Preceded by: Shōgo Ogawa
- Succeeded by: Tōru Sunaga
- Constituency: Gunma 2nd

Member of the Gunma Prefectural Assembly
- In office April 1975 – June 1986

Personal details
- Born: 23 July 1934 Tatebayashi, Gunma, Japan
- Died: 3 June 2021 (aged 86) Tatebayashi, Gunma, Japan
- Party: Liberal Democratic
- Education: Hosei University

Yoshio Yatsu (谷津 義男, Yatsu Yoshio; 23 July 1934 – 3 June 2021) was a Japanese politician of the Liberal Democratic Party, who served as a member of the House of Representatives in the Diet (national legislature). A native of Tatebayashi, Gunma and graduate of Hosei University, he was elected to the first of his three terms in the assembly of Gunma Prefecture in 1975 and to the House of Representatives for the first time in 1986. After losing his seat in 1990, he was re-elected in the same year. From 2000 to 2001 he served as the Minister of Agriculture, Forestry and Fisheries.
