= Ojima, Gunma =

Dissolved municipality in Gunma prefecture, Japan

Ojima (尾島町, Ojima-machi) was a town located in Nitta District, Gunma Prefecture, Japan.

== Merge ==
On March 28, 2005, Ojima, along with the towns of Nitta and Yabuzukahon (all from Nitta District), was merged into the expanded city of Ōta.
