= Takashi Ishizeki =

Japanese politician (born 1972)

- 石関 貴史
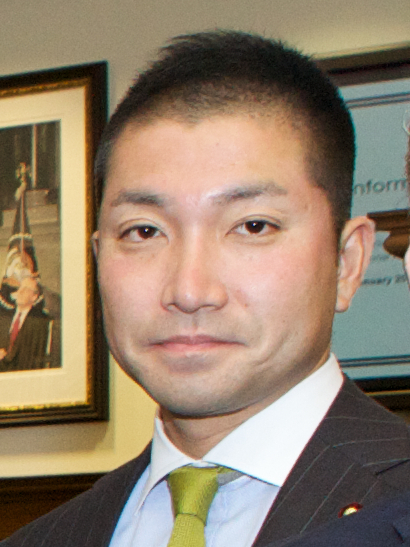
- Ishizeki in 2014

Member of the House of Representatives; from Northern Kanto
- In office 12 September 2005 – 28 September 2017
- Constituency: PR block (2005–2009); Gunma 2nd (2009–2012); PR block (2012–2017)

Member of the Gunma Prefectural Assembly
- In office 2003–2005
- Constituency: Isesaki City

Member of the Isesaki City Council
- In office 1999–2003

Personal details
- Born: 18 February 1972 (age 54) Isesaki, Gunma, Japan
- Party: Independent
- Other political affiliations: LDP (1999–2005); DPJ (2005–2012); JRP (2012–2014); JIP (2014–2016); DP (2016–2017); KnT (2017–2018)
- Education: Waseda University; University of London

Takashi Ishizeki (石関 貴史, Ishizeki Takashi; born 18 February 1972) is a former Japanese politician of the Democratic Party of Japan, who served as a member of the House of Representatives in the Diet (national legislature).

== Early life ==
Ishizeki is a native of Isesaki, Gunma and a graduate of Waseda University. He worked at the Ministry of Posts and Telecommunications from 1994 to 1998, during which time he studied at the University of London.

== Political career ==
Ishizeki was elected to the city assembly of Isesaki in 1999, to the assembly of Gunma Prefecture in 2003 and to the House of Representatives for the first time in 2005.

Ishizeki is affiliated to the revisionist lobby Nippon Kaigi.
