= Nitta District, Gunma =

Former district in Gunma prefecture, Japan

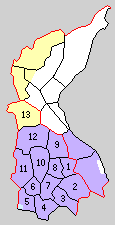
Historic Map of Nitta District: 1. Ōta, 2. Kuai, 3.Sawano, 4. Ojima, 5. Serada, 6. Kizaki, 7. Hosen, 8. Torinogo, 9. Godo, 10. Izushina, 11.Watauchi 12. Yabuzukahonmachi, 12.Kasakake

Nitta District (新田郡, Nitta-gun) was formerly a rural district located in Gunma Prefecture, Japan. Most of the city Ōta and parts of the cities of Midori and Isesaki were formerly part of the district

Nitta District was created on December 7, 1878, with the reorganization of Gunma Prefecture into districts. It included one town (Ōta) and 96 villages, which were formerly part of the tenryō holdings in Kōzuke Province under the direct administration of the Tokugawa shogunate or administered by hatamoto, 12 villages under Maebashi Domain, and one village each under Tatebayshi Domain, Okabe Domain (Musashi Province), and Sano Domain (Shimotsuke Province) and two villages under Nishibata Domain (Mikawa Province). With the establishment of the municipalities system on April 1, 1889, the area was organized into four towns (Ota, Kizaki, Yabuzukahon, and Ojima) and 9 villages (Kasakake, Kuai, Sawano, Torinosato, Namashina, Watauchi, Kyodo, Serada and Hosen).

== History ==
- April 1, 1940 - The town of Ōta and the villages of Kokonoai and Sawano were merged with the village of Nirakawa (from Yamada District) to create the town of Ōta. (4 towns, 7 villages)
- November 1, 1943 - The village of Torinosato was merged into the town of Ōta. (4 towns, 6 villages)
- May 3, 1948 - The town of Ōta was elevated to city status. (3 towns, 6 villages)
- September 30, 1956 - The town of Kizaki and the villages of Namashima and Watauchi were merged to create the town of Nitta. (3 towns, 4 villages)
- April 1, 1957 - The village of Kyodo was merged into the city of Ota. (3 towns, 3 villages)
- November 1, 1957 - The village of Serada had split and was merged into the town of Sakai (in Sawa District, now the city of Isesaki) and the town of Ojima, respectively. (3 towns, 2 villages)
- April 1, 1963 - The village of Hosen was merged into the city of Ōta. (3 towns, 1 village)
- April 1, 1990 - The village of Kasakake was elevated to town status. (4 towns)
- March 28, 2005 - The towns of Nitta, Ojima and Yabuzukahon were merged into the expanded city of Ōta. (1 town)
- March 27, 2006 - The town of Kasakake was merged with the town of Ōmama (from Yamada District), and the village of Azuma (from Seta District) to create the city of Midori. Nitta District was dissolved as a result of this merger.

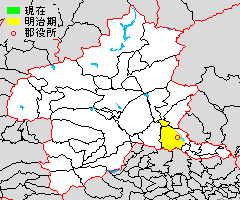
Map showing location of Nitta District within Gunma Prefecture
