= Yabuzukahon, Gunma =

Dissolved municipality in Gunma prefecture, Japan

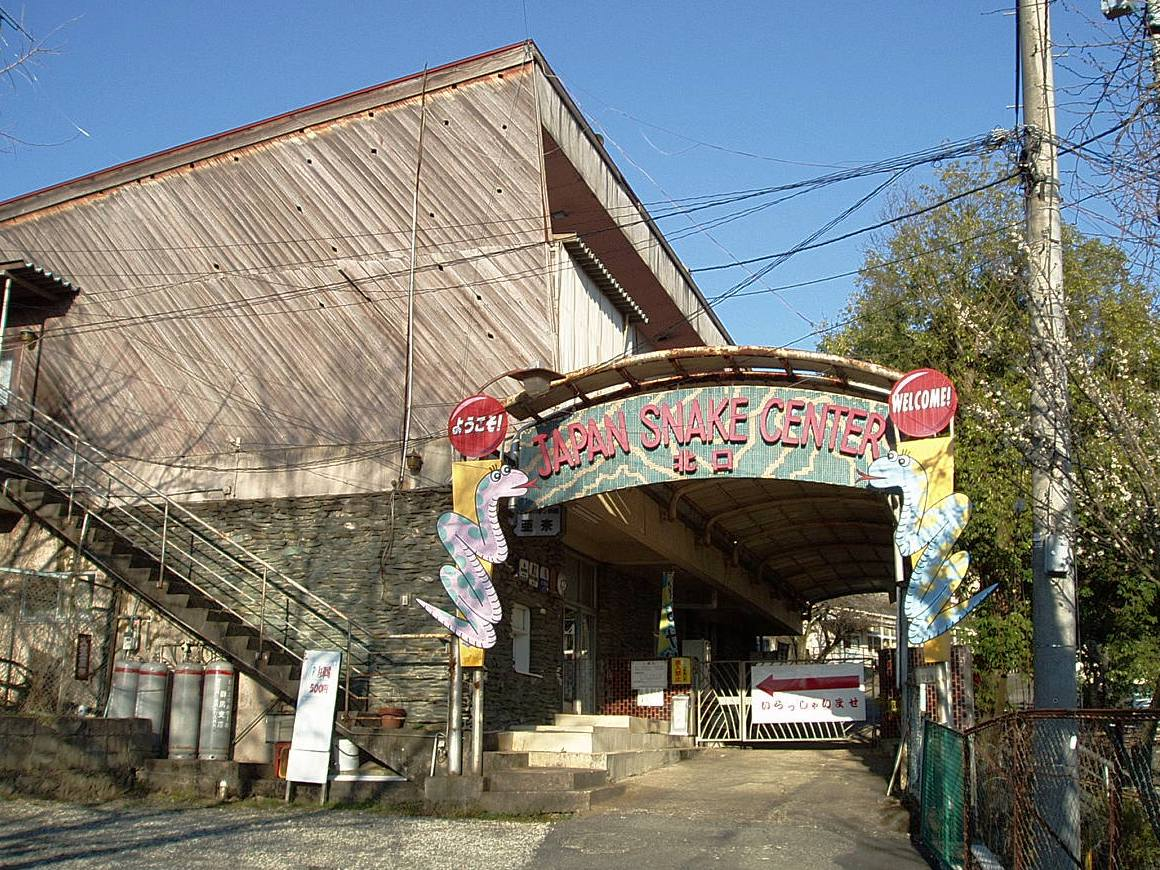
Japan Snake Center

Yabuzukahon (藪塚本町, Yabuzukahon-machi) was a town located in Nitta District, Gunma Prefecture, Japan.

On March 28, 2005, Yabuzukahon, along with the towns of Nitta and Ojima (all from Nitta District), was merged into the expanded city of Ōta.

== Geography ==
=== River ===
- 蛇川

== Place name ==
- 大原
- 大久保
- 薮塚
- 山之神
- 寄合
- 六千石

=== Adjacent municipality ===
- 桐生市
- 伊勢崎市
- 新田郡
  - 新田町
  - 笠懸町

== Infrastructure ==
=== School ===
- 藪塚本町小学校
- 藪塚本町南小学校
- 藪塚本町中学校

=== Library ===
- 藪塚本町図書館

=== Children's center ===
- 藪塚本町児童館

=== Police ===
- 太田警察署 藪塚本町交番

=== Health ===
- 藪塚本町保健センター

=== Posto office ===
- 藪塚本町郵便局
- 藪塚駅前郵便局

=== Park ===
- 藪塚本町中央運動公園
