= Nitta, Gunma =

Dissolved municipality in Gunma prefecture, Japan

Nitta (新田町, Nitta-machi) was a town located in Nitta District, Gunma Prefecture, Japan.

On March 28, 2005, Nitta, along with the towns of Ojima and Yabuzukahon (all from Nitta District), was merged into the expanded city of Ōta.
