= Second Koizumi cabinet =

- 88th Cabinet of Japan

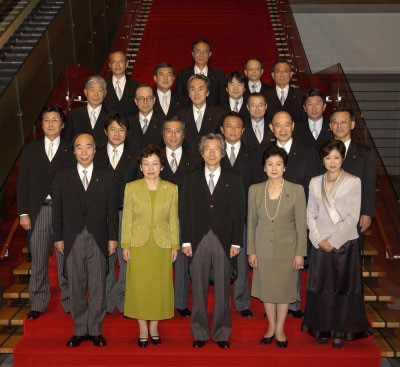
- Prime Minister Junichiro Koizumi (front row, centre) with the re-elected cabinet inside the Kantei, November 19, 2003
- Date formed: November 19, 2003
- Date dissolved: September 21, 2005

People and organisations
- Head of state: Emperor Akihito
- Head of government: Junichiro Koizumi
- Member party: LDP-NKP Majority coalition
- Status in legislature: Coalition Majority
- Opposition party: Democratic Party of Japan
- Opposition leader: Naoto Kan (until May 18, 2004); Katsuya Okada (from May 18, 2004)

History
- Elections: 2003 general election 2004 councillors election
- Predecessor: Koizumi I
- Successor: Koizumi III

The Second Koizumi cabinet was the cabinet of Japanese Prime Minister Junichiro Koizumi during his second term from November 2003 to September 2005. The cabinet was formed after the coalition of the Liberal Democratic Party and the Komeito was re-elected with a slightly reduced majority at the November 2003 general elections. The LDP lost 10 of its pre-election seats to become a minority in the National Diet, but immediately regained a majority by absorbing its coalition partner, the New Conservative Party. Koizumi had reshuffled the cabinet less than two months before the election, and so made no changes when he was re-elected by the Diet on November 19.

== Political background ==
Koizumi had promised that if re-elected he would send the Self-Defence Forces to Iraq to assist with reconstruction before the end of the year, a pledge which proved unpopular during the election. One month into his second term, the cabinet approved the dispatch, and the SDF joined UN peacekeeping forces in Iraq in 2004, though this action continued to damage Koizumi's standing, with polls showing the public opposed. The Koizumi cabinet's policies of structural economic reforms continued during its second term, some of which proved controversial. In the spring of 2004 the government introduced reforms designed to cut pension costs by reducing state benefits and increasing user costs. This policy was not only unpopular, but cost Koizumi a minister when Chief Cabinet Secretary Yasuo Fukuda resigned after it was revealed he had failed to make his payments.

The political fallout from Iraq and the pension reforms led to poor results for the LDP in the July 2004 upper house elections. While the coalition retained its majority, and the LDP remained the largest party, the opposition DPJ narrowly won the largest number of the contested seats. This was considered a setback, and reflective of the Prime Minister's decline in popularity, but Koizumi refused to resign. Two months after the election, Koizumi conducted the first reshuffle of his second cabinet in an attempt to improve his popularity, he changed several key ministers, but kept his key economic team in place.

The centrepiece of Koizumi's economic programme, which he referred to as the "inner citadel of reform", was his plan to privatize the postal service, then the world's largest bank with 2 trillion dollars' worth of assets. This plan was deeply unpopular with many LDP members, for whom the postal service formed a large part of their base, and it was not until Koizumi's second term that his government was able to finalize the bills and introduced them into the Diet (although the LDP itself did not endorse them). Although the LDP-Komeito coalition enjoyed a lower house majority of nearly 80, when the vote finally occurred a large party rebellion saw the postal bills pass by only 5 votes in July 2005. When the plan was subsequently rejected by the House of Councillors, Koizumi immediately dissolved the Diet and called a snap election for September 2005, refused to endorse the postal rebels, and pledged to resign unless his government was returned with a majority to implement the reform. In the election, the LDP won a landslide victory, and Koizumi was re-elected to form his third cabinet in September 2005.

== Election of the prime minister ==
19 November 2003
House of Representatives Absolute majority (241/480) required
Choice	First Vote
Choice	Votes
Junichiro Koizumi	281 / 480
Naoto Kan	186 / 480
Shii Kazuo	9 / 480
Abstentions (Including blank ballots)	3 / 480
Source Diet Minutes - 158th Session

== Lists of ministers ==
Liberal Democratic
New Komeito
Independent
R = Member of the House of Representatives
C = Member of the House of Councillors

=== Cabinet ===
Second Koizumi Cabinet from November 19, 2003 to September 27, 2004
Portfolio	Minister		Term of office
Prime Minister	Junichiro Koizumi	R	April 26, 2001 - September 26, 2006
Minister for Public Management, Home Affairs, Posts and Telecommunications	Tarō Asō	R	September 22, 2003 - October 31, 2005
Minister of Justice	Daizō Nozawa	C	September 22, 2003 - September 27, 2004
Minister of Foreign Affairs	Yoriko Kawaguchi	-	February 1, 2002 - September 27, 2004
Minister of Finance	Sadakazu Tanigaki	R	September 22, 2003 - September 26, 2006
Minister of Education, Culture, Sports, Science and Technology	Takeo Kawamura	R	September 22, 2003 - September 27, 2004
Minister of Health, Labour, and Welfare	Chikara Sakaguchi	R	January 6, 2001 - September 27, 2004
Minister of Agriculture, Forestry and Fisheries	Yoshiyuki Kamei	R	April 1, 2003 - September 27, 2004
Minister of Economy, Trade and Industry	Shōichi Nakagawa	R	September 22, 2003 - October 31, 2005
Ministry of Land, Infrastructure, Transport and Tourism	Nobuteru Ishihara	R	September 22, 2003 - September 27, 2004
Minister of the Environment	Yuriko Koike	R	September 22, 2003 - September 26, 2006
Chief Cabinet Secretary; Minister for Gender Equality	Yasuo Fukuda	R	October 27, 2000 - May 7, 2004
Chief Cabinet Secretary; Minister for Gender Equality	Hiroyuki Hosoda	R	May 7, 2004 - October 31, 2005
Director of the National Public Safety Commission	Kiyoko Ono	C	September 22, 2003 - September 27, 2004
Director of the Japan Defense Agency	Shigeru Ishiba	R	September 30, 2002 - September 27, 2004
Minister of State for Okinawa and Northern Territories Affairs; Minister of State (Science and Technology Policy); Minister of State for Personal Information Protection	Toshimitsu Motegi	R	September 22, 2003 - September 27, 2004
Minister of State for Economic and Fiscal Policy; Minister of State for Financial Services	Heizō Takenaka	-	April 26, 2001 - October 31, 2005
Minister of State for Regulatory Reform; Minister of State for Industrial Revitalization Corporation of Japan; Minister of State for Administrative Reform; Minister of State for Special Zones for Structural Reform; Minister of State for Regional Revitalization	Kazuyoshi Kaneko	R	September 22, 2003 - September 27, 2004
Minister for Disaster Management; Minister of State for National Emergency Legislation	Kiichi Inoue	R	September 22, 2003 - September 27, 2004
Deputy Secretaries
Deputy Chief Cabinet Secretary (Political Affairs - House of Representatives)	Hiroyuki Hosoda	R	September 22, 2003 - May 7, 2004
Deputy Chief Cabinet Secretary (Political Affairs - House of Representatives)	Seiken Sugiura	R	May 7, 2004 - October 31, 2005
Deputy Chief Cabinet Secretary (Political Affairs - House of Councillors)	Masaaki Yamazaki	C	September 22, 2003 - October 31, 2005
Deputy Chief Cabinet Secretary (Bureaucrat)	Masahiro Futahashi	-	September 22, 2003 - September 26, 2006

==== Changes ====
- November 21 - The New Conservative Party formally dissolved. Its members joined the LDP and remained in government.
- May 7, 2004 - Chief Cabinet Secretary Yasuo Fukuda resigned from the cabinet after a controversy in which it was revealed that he and several other ministers had failed to pay mandatory pension contributions, at a time when the government was attempting to pass contentious pension reforms. Deputy Chief Cabinet Secretary Hiroyuki Hosoda was promoted to replace him, and he in turn was replaced with Seiken Sugiura.
- July 2004 - Economic and Fiscal Policy Minister Heizō Takenaka entered the Diet for the first time when he won a seat in the House of Councillors election.

=== Reshuffled cabinet ===
Second Koizumi Cabinet (Reshuffle)
- 88th Cabinet of Japan

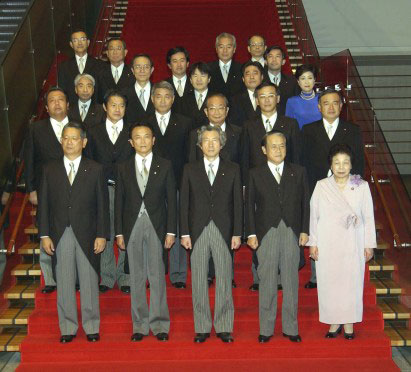
- Prime Minister Junichiro Koizumi (front row, centre) with his reshuffled cabinet inside the Kantei, September 27, 2004
- Date formed: September 27, 2004
- Date dissolved: September 21, 2005

People and organisations
- Head of state: Emperor Akihito
- Head of government: Junichiro Koizumi
- Member party: LDP-NKP Majority coalition
- Status in legislature: Coalition Majority
- Opposition party: Democratic Party of Japan
- Opposition leader: Naoto Kan (until May 18, 2004); Katsuya Okada (from May 18, 2004)

History
- Elections: 2003 general election 2004 councillors election
- Predecessor: Second Koizumi Cabinet
- Successor: Third Koizumi Cabinet

Second Koizumi Cabinet from September 27, 2004 to September 21, 2005
Portfolio	Minister		Term of office
Prime Minister	Junichiro Koizumi	R	April 26, 2001 - September 26, 2006
Minister for Internal Affairs and Communications	Tarō Asō	R	September 22, 2003 - October 31, 2005
Minister of Justice; Minister of State for Youth Affairs and Measures for Declining Birthrate	Chieko Nōno	C	September 27, 2004 - October 31, 2005
Minister of Foreign Affairs	Nobutaka Machimura	R	September 27, 2004 - October 31, 2005
Minister of Finance	Sadakazu Tanigaki	R	September 22, 2003 - September 26, 2006
Minister of Education, Culture, Sports, Science and Technology	Nariaki Nakayama	R	September 27, 2004 - October 31, 2005
Minister of Health, Labour, and Welfare	Hidehisa Otsuji	C	September 27, 2004 - October 31, 2005
Minister of Agriculture, Forestry and Fisheries	Yoshinobu Shimamura	R	September 27, 2004 - August 8, 2005
Minister of Agriculture, Forestry and Fisheries	Junichiro Koizumi	R	August 8, 2005 - August 11, 2005
Minister of Agriculture, Forestry and Fisheries	Mineichi Iwanaga	R	August 11, 2005 - October 31, 2005
Minister of Economy, Trade and Industry	Shōichi Nakagawa	R	September 22, 2003 - October 31, 2005
Ministry of Land, Infrastructure, Transport and Tourism	Kazuo Kitagawa	R	September 27, 2004 - September 26, 2006
Minister of the Environment; Minister of State for Okinawa and Northern Territories Affairs	Yuriko Koike	R	September 22, 2003 - September 26, 2006
Chief Cabinet Secretary; Minister for Gender Equality	Hiroyuki Hosoda	R	May 7, 2004 - October 31, 2005
Director of the National Public Safety Commission; Minister for Disaster Management; Minister of State for National Emergency Legislation	Yoshitaka Murata	R	September 27, 2004 - October 31, 2005
Director of the Japan Defense Agency	Yoshinori Ohno	R	September 27, 2004 - October 31, 2005
Minister of State for Financial Services	Tatsuya Ito	R	September 27, 2004 - October 31, 2005
Minister of State for Economic and Fiscal Policy; Minister of State for Privatization of the Postal Services	Heizō Takenaka	C	April 26, 2001 - October 31, 2005
Minister of State for Regulatory Reform; Minister of State for Industrial Revitalization Corporation of Japan; Minister of State for Administrative Reform; Minister of State for Special Zones for Structural Reform; Minister of State for Regional Revitalization	Seiichiro Murakami	R	September 27, 2004 - October 31, 2005
Minister of State (Science and Technology Policy); Minister of State for Food Protection; Minister of State for Information Technology	Yasufumi Tanahashi	R	September 27, 2004 - October 31, 2005
Deputy Secretaries
Deputy Chief Cabinet Secretary (Political Affairs - House of Representatives)	Seiken Sugiura	R	May 7, 2004 - October 31, 2005
Deputy Chief Cabinet Secretary (Political Affairs - House of Councillors)	Masaaki Yamazaki	C	September 22, 2003 - October 31, 2005
Deputy Chief Cabinet Secretary (Bureaucrat)	Masahiro Futahashi	-	September 22, 2003 - September 26, 2006

==== Changes ====
- August 8, 2005 - Agriculture Minister Yoshinobu Shimamura was dismissed for his opposition to the dissolution of the House of Representatives over the postal privatisation bills. He was replaced with Mineichi Iwanaga.
