= Koizumi Cabinet =

Koizumi Cabinet may refer to:

- First Koizumi Cabinet, the Japanese majority government led by Junichiro Koizumi from 2001 to 2003
- Second Koizumi Cabinet, the Japanese majority government led by Junichiro Koizumi from 2003 to 2005
- Third Koizumi Cabinet, the Japanese majority government led by Junichiro Koizumi from 2005 to 2006
