= Third Koizumi cabinet =

- 89th Cabinet of Japan

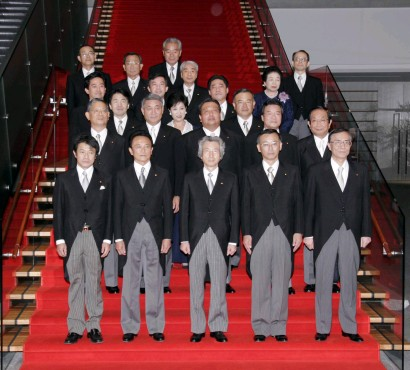
- Prime Minister Junichiro Koizumi (front row, centre) with the re-elected cabinet inside the Kantei, September 21, 2005
- Date formed: September 21, 2005
- Date dissolved: September 26, 2006

People and organisations
- Head of state: Emperor Akihito
- Head of government: Junichiro Koizumi
- Member party: LDP-NKP coalition
- Status in legislature: HoR: LDP-NKP Coalition Supermajority; HoC: LDP-NKP Coalition majority
- Opposition party: Democratic Party of Japan
- Opposition leader: Seiji Maehara (until April 7, 2006); Ichirō Ozawa (from April 7, 2006)

History
- Election: 2005 general election
- Predecessor: Koizumi II
- Successor: Abe I

The Third Koizumi cabinet governed Japan for the final year of Junichiro Koizumi's term as prime minister, from September 2005 to September 2006, following the landslide victory of his coalition in the "postal election" of 2005.

== Background ==
Following his re-election by the National Diet on September 21, Koizumi did not make any ministerial changes when inaugurating his third cabinet, keeping his previous team in place to focus on the re-introduction and passage of the bills to privatize Japan Post, which had formed the basis for his re-election campaign. Once this was accomplished, Koizumi conducted his final cabinet reshuffle on October 31 at the end of the Diet session. This reshuffle promoted several potential successors including Sadakazu Tanigaki, who was reappointed as Finance Minister, Tarō Asō, who was moved to become Foreign Minister, and Shinzō Abe, who was promoted from LDP Secretary General to the post of Chief Cabinet Secretary. Koizumi also promoted Heizō Takenaka his long-serving minister for economic reform, to the position of Minister for Internal Affairs and Communications to oversee the implementation of postal and administrative reform.

Since 1980, the Liberal Democratic Party has limited its leader to two consecutive terms, meaning that Koizumi was bound to stand down as prime minister in September 2006 when his second term expired. This gave him just one year following his re-election to conclude the reforms he had advocated during his terms of office, though he admitted in September 2005 that some would not be achieved in that time, such as constitutional revision to allow the Self-Defence Forces full military status. During the final session of the Diet under Koizumi's premiership, 82 out of 91 government bills were passed, including administrative and healthcare reforms, though education, constitutional and criminal law reforms were not enacted. Despite calls from some members of the LDP and the Komeito to amend party rules and allow him to stay on (amendments which allow the President of LDP have another 3 years term, which later amended by Shinzo Abe in 2015), Koizumi adhered to the term limit and retired in September 26, 2006.

== Election of the prime minister ==
21 September 2005
House of Representatives Absolute majority (241/480) required
| Choice | First Vote |
| Choice | Votes |
|---|---|
| Junichiro Koizumi | 340 / 480 |
| Seiji Maehara | 114 / 480 |
| Others and Abstentions (Including blank ballots) | 26 / 480 |
Source Diet Minutes - 163rd Session

== Lists of ministers ==
Liberal Democratic
New Komeito
Independent
R = Member of the House of Representatives
C = Member of the House of Councillors

=== Cabinet ===
Third Koizumi Cabinet from September 21, 2005 to October 31, 2005
| Portfolio | Minister | | Term of office |
|---|---|---|---|
| Prime Minister | Junichiro Koizumi | R | April 26, 2001 - September 26, 2006 |
| Minister for Internal Affairs and Communications | Tarō Asō | R | September 22, 2003 - October 31, 2005 |
| Minister of Justice; Minister of State for Youth Affairs and Measures for Declining Birthrate | Chieko Nōno | C | September 27, 2004 - October 31, 2005 |
| Minister of Foreign Affairs | Nobutaka Machimura | R | September 27, 2004 - October 31, 2005 |
| Minister of Finance | Sadakazu Tanigaki | R | September 22, 2003 - September 26, 2006 |
| Minister of Education, Culture, Sports, Science and Technology | Nariaki Nakayama | R | September 27, 2004 - October 31, 2005 |
| Minister of Health, Labour, and Welfare | Hidehisa Otsuji | C | September 27, 2004 - October 31, 2005 |
| Minister of Agriculture, Forestry and Fisheries | Mineichi Iwanaga | R | August 11, 2005 - October 31, 2005 |
| Minister of Economy, Trade and Industry | Shōichi Nakagawa | R | September 22, 2003 - October 31, 2005 |
| Ministry of Land, Infrastructure, Transport and Tourism | Kazuo Kitagawa | R | September 27, 2004 - September 26, 2006 |
| Minister of the Environment; Minister of State for Okinawa and Northern Territories Affairs | Yuriko Koike | R | September 22, 2003 - September 26, 2006 |
| Chief Cabinet Secretary; Minister for Gender Equality | Hiroyuki Hosoda | R | May 7, 2004 - October 31, 2005 |
| Director of the National Public Safety Commission; Minister for Disaster Management; Minister of State for National Emergency Legislation | Yoshitaka Murata | R | September 27, 2004 - October 31, 2005 |
| Director of the Japan Defense Agency | Yoshinori Ohno | R | September 27, 2004 - October 31, 2005 |
| Minister of State for Financial Services | Tatsuya Ito | R | September 27, 2004 - October 31, 2005 |
| Minister of State for Economic and Fiscal Policy; Minister of State for Privatization of the Postal Services | Heizō Takenaka | C | April 26, 2001 - October 31, 2005 |
| Minister of State for Regulatory Reform; Minister of State for Industrial Revitalization Corporation of Japan; Minister of State for Administrative Reform; Minister of State for Special Zones for Structural Reform; Minister of State for Regional Revitalization | Seiichiro Murakami | R | September 27, 2004 - October 31, 2005 |
| Minister of State (Science and Technology Policy); Minister of State for Food Protection; Minister of State for Information Technology | Yasufumi Tanahashi | R | September 27, 2004 - October 31, 2005 |
Deputy Secretaries
| Deputy Chief Cabinet Secretary (Political Affairs - House of Representatives) | Seiken Sugiura | R | May 7, 2004 - October 31, 2005 |
| Deputy Chief Cabinet Secretary (Political Affairs - House of Councillors) | Masaaki Yamazaki | C | September 22, 2003 - October 31, 2005 |
| Deputy Chief Cabinet Secretary (Bureaucrat) | Masahiro Futahashi | - | September 22, 2003 - September 26, 2006 |

=== Reshuffled cabinet ===
Third Koizumi Cabinet (Reshuffle Cabinet)
- 89th Cabinet of Japan

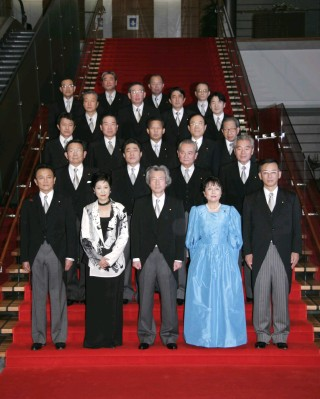
- Prime Minister Junichiro Koizumi (front row, centre) with his reshuffled cabinet inside the Kantei, October 31, 2005
- Date formed: October 31, 2005
- Date dissolved: September 26, 2006

People and organisations
- Head of state: Emperor Akihito
- Head of government: Junichiro Koizumi
- Member party: LDP-NKP coalition
- Status in legislature: HoR: LDP-NKP Coalition Supermajority; HoC: LDP-NKP Coalition majority
- Opposition party: Democratic Party of Japan
- Opposition leader: Seiji Maehara (until April 7, 2006); Ichirō Ozawa (from April 7, 2006)

History
- Election: 2005 general election
- Predecessor: Third Koizumi Cabinet
- Successor: First Abe Cabinet

Third Koizumi Cabinet from October 31, 2005 to September 26, 2006
| Portfolio | Minister | | Term of office |
|---|---|---|---|
| Prime Minister | Junichiro Koizumi | R | April 26, 2001 - September 26, 2006 |
| Minister for Internal Affairs and Communications; Minister of State for Privatization of the Postal Services | Heizō Takenaka | C | October 31, 2005 - September 26, 2006 |
| Minister of Justice | Seiken Sugiura | R | October 31, 2005 - September 26, 2006 |
| Minister of Foreign Affairs | Tarō Asō | R | October 31, 2005 - August 27, 2007 |
| Minister of Finance | Sadakazu Tanigaki | R | September 22, 2003 - September 26, 2006 |
| Minister of Education, Culture, Sports, Science and Technology | Kenji Kosaka | R | October 31, 2005 - September 26, 2006 |
| Minister of Health, Labour, and Welfare | Jirō Kawasaki | R | October 31, 2005 - September 26, 2006 |
| Minister of Agriculture, Forestry and Fisheries | Shōichi Nakagawa | R | October 31, 2005 - September 26, 2006 |
| Minister of Economy, Trade and Industry | Toshihiro Nikai | R | October 31, 2005 - September 26, 2006 |
| Ministry of Land, Infrastructure, Transport and Tourism | Kazuo Kitagawa | R | September 27, 2004 - September 26, 2006 |
| Minister of the Environment; Minister of State for Okinawa and Northern Territories Affairs; Minister in Charge of Global Environmental Problems | Yuriko Koike | R | September 22, 2003 - September 26, 2006 |
| Chief Cabinet Secretary | Shinzō Abe | R | October 31, 2005 - September 26, 2006 |
| Director of the National Public Safety Commission; Minister for Disaster Management; Minister of State for National Emergency Legislation | Tetsuo Kutsukake | C | October 31, 2005 - September 26, 2006 |
| Director of the Japan Defense Agency | Fukushiro Nukaga | R | October 31, 2005 - September 26, 2006 |
| Minister of State for Economic and Fiscal Policy; Minister of State for Financial Services | Kaoru Yosano | R | October 31, 2005 - September 26, 2006 |
| Minister of State for Administrative Reform; Minister of State for Regulatory Reform; Minister of State for Special Zones for Structural Reform; Minister of State for Regional Revitalization | Kouki Chuma | R | October 31, 2005 - September 26, 2006 |
| Minister of State (Science and Technology Policy); Minister of State for Food Protection; Minister of State for Information Technology | Iwao Matsuda | C | October 31, 2005 - September 26, 2006 |
| Minister of State for Gender Equality and Social Affairs | Kuniko Inoguchi | R | October 31, 2005 - September 26, 2006 |
Deputy Secretaries
| Deputy Chief Cabinet Secretary (Political Affairs - House of Representatives) | Jinen Nagase | R | October 31, 2005 - September 26, 2006 |
| Deputy Chief Cabinet Secretary (Political Affairs - House of Councillors) | Seiji Suzuki | C | October 31, 2005 - August 27, 2007 |
| Deputy Chief Cabinet Secretary (Bureaucrat) | Masahiro Futahashi | - | September 22, 2003 - September 26, 2006 |
