= Fourth Abe cabinet =

98th Cabinet of Japan (2017–2020)

- 98th Cabinet of Japan
- 1 November 2017 – 16 September 2020
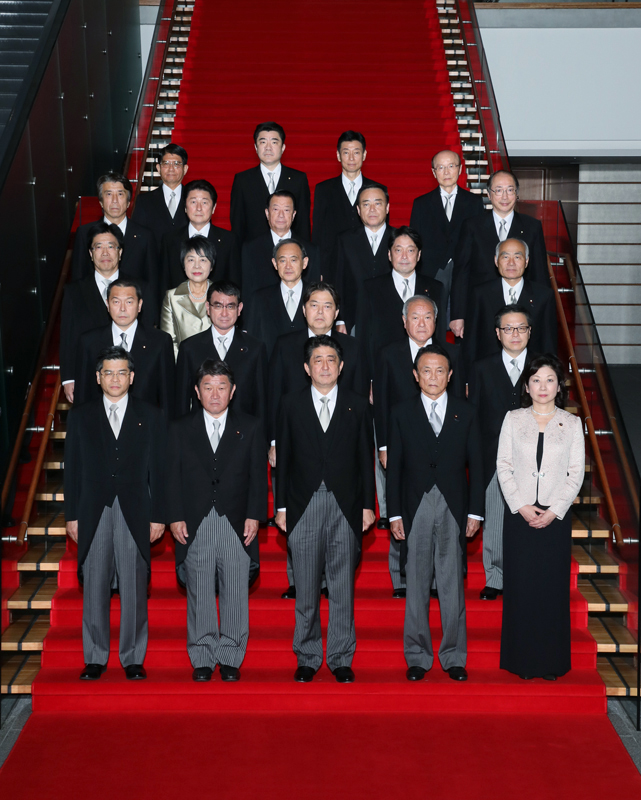
- Prime Minister Shinzō Abe (front row, centre) with the re-elected cabinet inside the Kantei, November 1, 2017
- Date formed: November 1, 2017
- Date dissolved: September 16, 2020

People and organisations
- Head of state: Emperor Akihito (2017–2019); Emperor Naruhito (2019–2020)
- Head of government: Shinzō Abe
- Deputy head of government: Tarō Asō
- Member party: Liberal Democratic–Komeito Coalition
- Status in legislature: Coalition government HoR (Lower): Supermajority; HoC (Upper): Majority
- Opposition party: Constitutional Democratic Party of Japan
- Opposition leader: Yukio Edano

History
- Elections: 2017 general election 2019 councillors election
- Predecessor: Abe III
- Successor: Suga

The Fourth Abe cabinet governed Japan under the leadership of Prime Minister Shinzō Abe from November 2017 to September 2020. The government is a coalition between the Liberal Democratic Party and the Komeito (which had changed its name from "New Komeito" in the 2012–2014 term) and controls both the upper and lower houses of the National Diet.

Following his resignation, the Fourth Abe cabinet was dissolved on September 16, 2020, and replaced with the Suga cabinet.

According to research by Nikkan Gendai, 10 out of 20 members in the Fourth Abe Cabinet had connections to the Unification Church. These connections were largely not reported by Japanese media at the time.

== Election of the prime minister ==
1 November 2017
House of Representatives Absolute majority (233/465) required
Choice	Vote	
Choice	Caucuses	Votes
Shinzō Abe	LDP (282), Independent [Speaker] (1), Komeito (29)	312 / 465
Yukio Edano	CDP (55), Liberal (2), SDP (2), Independent [Vice Speaker] (1)	60 / 465
Shū Watanabe	Kibō (51)	51 / 465
Kōhei Ōtsuka	Independents formerly from DP (16)	16 / 465
Kazuo Shii	JCP (12)	12 / 465
Toranosuke Katayama	Ishin (11)	11 / 465
Seiji Maehara	Independent [Katsuhito Nakajima] (1)	1 / 465
Eiichirō Washio	Independent [Eiichirō Washio] (1)	1 / 465
Invalid ballot	LDP (1)	1 / 465
Source: 195th Diet Session (House of Representatives) (roll call only lists individual votes, not grouped by caucus)

1 November 2017
House of Councillors Absolute majority (122/242) required
Choice	Vote	
Choice	Caucuses	Votes
Shinzō Abe	LDP-Kokoro (124), Komeito (24), Independents Club (2), Independent (1)	151 / 242
Kōhei Ōtsuka	DP (47), Independent [Vice President] (1)	48 / 242
Kazuo Shii	JCP (14)	14 / 242
Toranosuke Katayama	Ishin (11)	11 / 242
Yukio Edano	Hope Coalition (Liberal and SDP) (6), Okinawa Whirlwind (2), Independent-CDP [Tetsuro Fukuyama] (1)	9 / 242
Shū Watanabe	Kibō (3)	3 / 242
Kenzō Fujisue	Kokumin no Koe [People's Voice] (2)	2 / 242
Blank ballot	Independent [Kazuyuki Yamaguchi] (1)	1 / 242
Did not vote	Independent [President] (1), LDP-Kokoro (1), Komeito (1)	3 / 242
Source: 195th Diet Session (House of Councillors) (lists individual votes grouped by caucus)

== Lists of ministers ==
Liberal Democratic
Komeito
R = Member of the House of Representatives
C = Member of the House of Councillors

=== Cabinet ===
Fourth Abe Cabinet from November 1, 2017 to October 2, 2018
Portfolio	Minister		Term
Prime Minister	Shinzō Abe	R	December 26, 2012 – September 16, 2020
Deputy Prime Minister; Minister of Finance; Minister of State for Financial Services; Minister in charge of Overcoming Deflation	Tarō Asō	R	December 26, 2012 – October 4, 2021
Minister of Internal Affairs and Communications; Minister of State for Women's Empowerment; Minister of State for Gender Equality; Minister of State for the Social Security and Tax Number System	Seiko Noda	R	August 3, 2017 – October 2, 2018
Minister of Justice	Yōko Kamikawa	R	August 3, 2017 – October 2, 2018
Minister of Foreign Affairs	Tarō Kōno	R	August 3, 2017 – September 11, 2019
Minister of Education, Culture, Sports, Science and Technology; Minister in charge of Education Rebuilding	Yoshimasa Hayashi	C	August 3, 2017 – October 2, 2018
Minister of Health, Labour and Welfare; Minister for Working-style Reform; Minister in charge of the Abduction Issue; Minister of State for the Abduction Issue	Katsunobu Katō	R	August 3, 2017 – October 2, 2018
Minister of Agriculture, Forestry and Fisheries	Ken Saitō	R	August 3, 2017 – October 2, 2018
Minister of Economy, Trade and Industry; Minister of State for Industrial Competitiveness; Minister for Economic Cooperation with Russia; Minister in charge of the Response to the Economic Impact caused by the Nuclear Accident; Minister of State for the Nuclear Damage Compensation and Decommissioning Facilitation Corporation	Hiroshige Sekō	C	August 3, 2016 – September 11, 2019
Minister of Land, Infrastructure, Transport and Tourism; Minister of State for Water Cycle Policy	Keiichi Ishii	R	October 7, 2015 – September 11, 2019
Minister of the Environment; Minister of State for Nuclear Emergency Preparedness	Masaharu Nakagawa	C	August 3, 2017 – October 2, 2018
Minister of Defense	Itsunori Onodera	R	August 3, 2017 – October 2, 2018
Chief Cabinet Secretary; Minister in charge of Alleviating the Burden of the Bases in Okinawa	Yoshihide Suga	R	December 26, 2012 – September 16, 2020
Minister of State for Reconstruction; Minister in charge of Comprehensive Policy Coordination for Revival from the Nuclear Accident at Fukushima	Masayoshi Yoshino	R	April 26, 2017 – October 2, 2018
Chairperson of the National Public Safety Commission; Minister in charge of Building National Resilience; Minister of State for Disaster Management	Hachiro Okonogi	R	August 3, 2017 – October 2, 2018
Minister of State for Okinawa and Northern Territories Affairs; Minister of State for Consumer Affairs and Food Safety; Minister of State for Ocean Policy; Minister in charge of Territorial Issues	Tetsuma Esaki	R	August 3, 2017 – February 27, 2018
Minister of State for Okinawa and Northern Territories Affairs; Minister of State for Consumer Affairs and Food Safety; Minister of State for Ocean Policy; Minister in charge of Territorial Issues	Teru Fukui	R	February 27, 2018 – October 2, 2018
Minister for Promoting Dynamic Engagement of All Citizens; Minister in charge of Information Technology Policy; Minister of State for Measures for Declining Birthrate; Minister of State for the "Cool Japan" Strategy; Minister of State for the Intellectual Property Strategy; Minister of State for Science and Technology Policy; Minister of State for Space Policy	Masaji Matsuyama	C	August 3, 2017 – October 2, 2018
Minister in charge of Economic Revitalization; Minister for Human Resources Development; Minister in charge of Total Reform of Social Security and Tax; Minister of State for Economic and Fiscal Policy	Toshimitsu Motegi	R	August 3, 2017 – September 11, 2019
Minister of State for Regional Revitalization; Minister of State for Regulatory Reform; Minister in charge of Regional Revitalization; Minister of State for Administrative Reform; Minister of State for Civil Service Reform	Hiroshi Kajiyama	R	August 3, 2017 – October 2, 2018
Minister of State for the Tokyo Olympic and Paralympic Games	Shun'ichi Suzuki	R	August 3, 2017 – October 2, 2018
Deputy Chief Cabinet Secretaries
Deputy Chief Cabinet Secretary (Political Affairs – House of Representatives)	Yasutoshi Nishimura	R	August 3, 2017 – September 11, 2019
Deputy Chief Cabinet Secretary (Political Affairs – House of Councillors)	Kōtarō Nogami	C	August 13, 2016 – September 11, 2019
Deputy Chief Cabinet Secretary (Bureaucrat)	Kazuhiro Sugita	–	December 26, 2012 – October 4, 2021

==== Changes ====
- February 27, 2018 – Okinawa and Northern Territories Minister Tetsuma Esaki resigned and was replaced by Teru Fukui.

=== First reshuffled cabinet ===
Fourth Abe Cabinet (First Reshuffle)
- 98th Cabinet of Japan
- 2018–2019
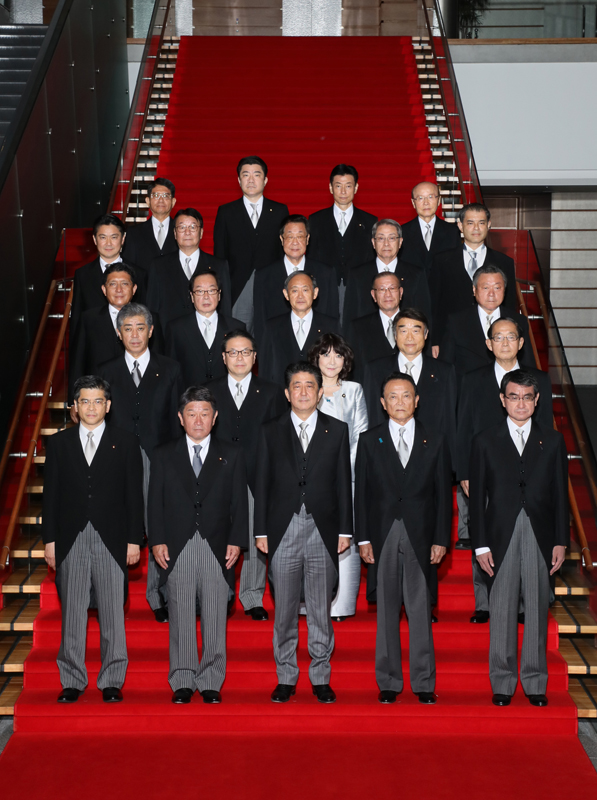
- Prime Minister Shinzō Abe (front row, centre) with his reshuffled cabinet inside the Kantei, October 2, 2018
- Date formed: October 2, 2018
- Date dissolved: September 11, 2019

People and organisations
- Emperor: Akihito (2018–Apr 2019); Naruhito (May–Sep 2019)
- Prime Minister: Shinzo Abe
- Deputy Prime Minister: Tarō Asō
- Member party: Liberal Democratic–Komeito Coalition
- Status in legislature: Coalition government HoR (Lower): Supermajority; HoC (Upper): Majority
- Opposition party: Constitutional Democratic Party of Japan
- Opposition leader: Yukio Edano

History
- Elections: 2017 general election 2019 councillors election
- Predecessor: Fourth Abe Cabinet
- Successor: Fourth Abe Cabinet (Second Reshuffle)

Fourth Abe Cabinet from October 2, 2018 to September 11, 2019
Portfolio	Minister		Term
Prime Minister	Shinzō Abe	R	December 26, 2012 – September 16, 2020
Deputy Prime Minister; Minister of Finance; Minister of State for Financial Services; Minister in charge of Overcoming Deflation	Tarō Asō	R	December 26, 2012 – October 4, 2021
Minister of Internal Affairs and Communications; Minister of State for the Social Security and Tax Number System	Masatoshi Ishida	R	October 2, 2018 – September 11, 2019
Minister of Justice	Takashi Yamashita	R	October 2, 2018 – September 11, 2019
Minister of Foreign Affairs	Tarō Kōno	R	August 3, 2017 – September 11, 2019
Minister of Education, Culture, Sports, Science and Technology; Minister in charge of Education Rebuilding	Masahiko Shibayama	R	October 2, 2018 – September 11, 2019
Minister of Health, Labour and Welfare; Minister for Working-style Reform	Takumi Nemoto	R	October 2, 2018 – September 11, 2019
Minister of Agriculture, Forestry and Fisheries	Takamori Yoshikawa	R	October 2, 2018 – September 11, 2019
Minister of Economy, Trade and Industry; Minister of State for Industrial Competitiveness; Minister for Economic Cooperation with Russia; Minister in charge of the Response to the Economic Impact caused by the Nuclear Accident; Minister of State for the Nuclear Damage Compensation and Decommissioning Facilitation Corporation	Hiroshige Sekō	C	August 3, 2016 – September 11, 2019
Minister of Land, Infrastructure, Transport and Tourism; Minister of State for Water Cycle Policy	Keiichi Ishii	R	October 7, 2015 – September 11, 2019
Minister of the Environment; Minister of State for Nuclear Emergency Preparedness	Yoshiaki Harada	R	October 2, 2018 – September 11, 2019
Minister of Defense	Takeshi Iwaya	R	October 2, 2018 – September 11, 2019
Chief Cabinet Secretary; Minister in charge of Alleviating the Burden of the Bases in Okinawa	Yoshihide Suga	R	December 26, 2012 – September 16, 2020
Minister of State for Reconstruction; Minister in charge of Comprehensive Policy Coordination for Revival from the Nuclear Accident at Fukushima	Hiromichi Watanabe	R	October 2, 2018 – September 11, 2019
Chairperson of the National Public Safety Commission; Minister in charge of Building National Resilience; Minister of State for Disaster Management	Junzo Yamamoto	C	October 2, 2018 – September 11, 2019
Minister in charge of Information Technology Policy; Minister of State for the "Cool Japan" Strategy; Minister of State for the Intellectual Property Strategy; Minister of State for Science and Technology Policy; Minister of State for Space Policy	Takuya Hirai	R	October 2, 2018 – September 11, 2019
Minister for Promoting Dynamic Engagement of All Citizens; Minister of State for Administrative Reform; Minister of State for Civil Service Reform; Minister in charge of Territorial Issues; Minister of State for Okinawa and Northern Territories Affairs; Minister of State for Consumer Affairs and Food Safety; Minister of State for Measures for Declining Birthrate; Minister of State for Ocean Policy	Mitsuhiro Miyakoshi	R	October 2, 2018 – September 11, 2019
Minister of State for Economic and Fiscal Policy; Minister in charge of Social Security Reform; Minister in charge of TPP and Japan-U.S. Trade Negotiations	Toshimitsu Motegi	R	August 3, 2017 – September 11, 2019
Minister of State for Regional Revitalization; Minister of State for Regulatory Reform; Minister of State for Gender Equality; Minister in charge of Women's Empowerment; Minister in charge of Regional Revitalization	Satsuki Katayama	C	October 2, 2018 – September 11, 2019
Minister of State for the Tokyo Olympic and Paralympic Games	Yoshitaka Sakurada	R	October 2, 2018 – April 10, 2019
Minister of State for the Tokyo Olympic and Paralympic Games	Shun'ichi Suzuki	R	April 10, 2019 – September 11, 2019
Deputy Chief Cabinet Secretaries
Deputy Chief Cabinet Secretary (Political Affairs – House of Representatives)	Yasutoshi Nishimura	R	August 3, 2017 – September 11, 2019
Deputy Chief Cabinet Secretary (Political Affairs – House of Councillors)	Kōtarō Nogami	C	August 13, 2016 – September 11, 2019
Deputy Chief Cabinet Secretary (Bureaucrat)	Kazuhiro Sugita	–	December 26, 2012 – October 4, 2021

==== Changes ====
- April 10, 2019 – Tokyo Olympic and Paralympic Games Minister Yoshitaka Sakurada resigned and was replaced by Shun'ichi Suzuki.

=== Second reshuffled cabinet ===
Fourth Abe Cabinet (Second Reshuffle)
- 98th Cabinet of Japan
- 2019–2020
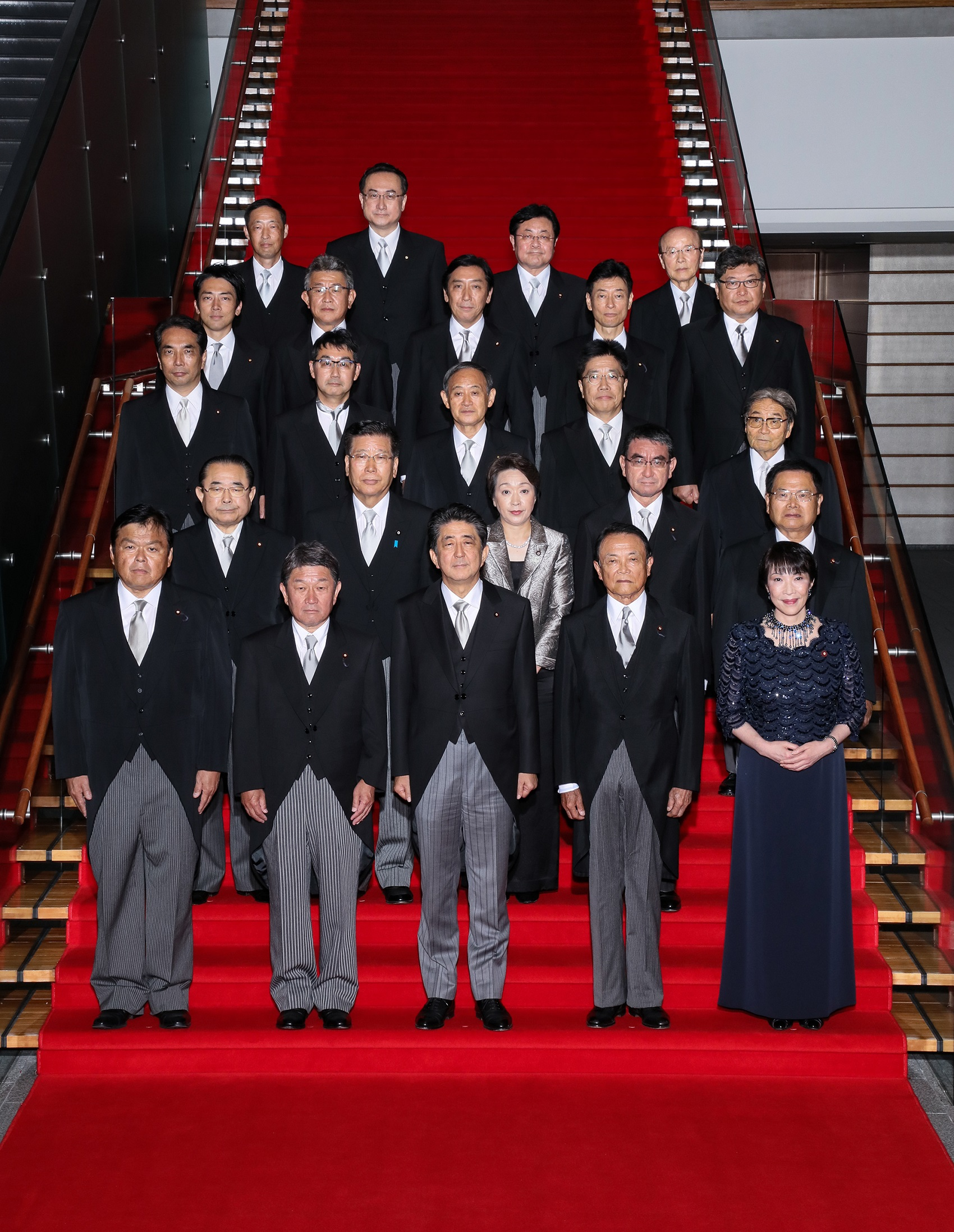
- Prime Minister Shinzō Abe (front row, centre) with his reshuffled cabinet inside the Kantei, September 11, 2019
- Date formed: September 11, 2019
- Date dissolved: September 16, 2020

People and organisations
- Head of state: Emperor Naruhito
- Head of government: Shinzō Abe
- Deputy head of government: Tarō Asō
- Member party: Liberal Democratic–Komeito Coalition
- Status in legislature: HoR: LDP-K Coalition supermajority HoC: LDP-K Coalition majority
- Opposition party: Constitutional Democratic Party of Japan
- Opposition leader: Yukio Edano

History
- Elections: 2017 general election 2019 councillors election
- Predecessor: Fourth Abe Cabinet (First Reshuffle)
- Successor: Suga Cabinet

Fourth Abe Cabinet from September 11, 2019 to September 16, 2020
Portfolio	Minister		Term
Prime Minister	Shinzō Abe	R	December 26, 2012 – September 16, 2020
Deputy Prime Minister; Minister of Finance; Minister of State for Financial Services; Minister in charge of Overcoming Deflation	Tarō Asō	R	December 26, 2012 – October 4, 2021
Minister for Internal Affairs and Communications; Minister of State for the Social Security and Tax Number System	Sanae Takaichi	R	September 11, 2019 – September 16, 2020
Minister of Justice	Katsuyuki Kawai	R	September 11, 2019 – October 31, 2019
Minister of Justice	Masako Mori	R	October 31, 2019 – September 16, 2020
Minister for Foreign Affairs	Toshimitsu Motegi	R	September 11, 2019 – November 4, 2021
Minister of Education, Culture, Sports, Science and Technology; Minister in charge of Education Rebuilding	Kōichi Hagiuda	R	September 11, 2019 – October 4, 2021
Minister of Health, Labour and Welfare; Minister in charge of Working-style Reform	Katsunobu Katō	R	September 11, 2019 – September 16, 2020
Minister of Agriculture, Forestry and Fisheries	Taku Etō	R	September 11, 2019 – September 16, 2020
Minister of Economy, Trade and Industry; Minister in charge of Industrial Competitiveness; Minister in charge of International Exposition; Minister of State for Economic Cooperation with Russia; Minister in charge of the Response to the Economic Impact caused by the Nuclear Accident; Minister of State for the Nuclear Damage Compensation and Decommissioning Facilitation Corporation	Isshu Sugawara	R	September 11, 2019 – October 25, 2019
Minister of Economy, Trade and Industry; Minister in charge of Industrial Competitiveness; Minister in charge of International Exposition; Minister of State for Economic Cooperation with Russia; Minister in charge of the Response to the Economic Impact caused by the Nuclear Accident; Minister of State for the Nuclear Damage Compensation and Decommissioning Facilitation Corporation	Hiroshi Kajiyama	R	October 25, 2019 – October 4, 2021
Minister of Land, Infrastructure, Transport and Tourism; Minister in charge of Water Cycle Policy	Kazuyoshi Akaba	R	September 11, 2019 – October 4, 2021
Minister of the Environment; Minister of State for Nuclear Emergency Preparedness	Shinjirō Koizumi	R	September 11, 2019 – October 4, 2021
Minister of Defense	Tarō Kōno	R	September 11, 2019 – September 16, 2020
Chief Cabinet Secretary; Minister in charge of Mitigating the Impact of U.S. Forces in Okinawa; Minister in charge of the Abductions Issue	Yoshihide Suga	R	December 26, 2012 – September 16, 2020
Minister for Reconstruction; Minister in charge of Comprehensive Policy Coordination for Revival from the Nuclear Accident at Fukushima	Kazunori Tanaka	R	September 11, 2019 – September 16, 2020
Chairperson of the National Public Safety Commission; Minister in charge of Administrative Reform; Minister in charge of Civil Service Reform; Minister in charge of Building National Resilience; Minister of State for Disaster Management	Ryota Takeda	R	September 11, 2019 – September 16, 2020
Minister for Promoting Dynamic Engagement of All Citizens; Minister in charge of Territorial Issues; Minister of State for Okinawa and Northern Territories Affairs; Minister of State for Consumer Affairs and Food Safety; Minister of State for Measures for the Declining Birthrate; Minister of State for Ocean Policy	Seiichi Eto	C	September 11, 2019 – September 16, 2020
Minister in charge of Information Technology Policy; Minister of State for "Cool Japan" Strategy; Minister of State for the Intellectual Property Strategy; Minister of State for Science and Technology Policy; Minister of State for Space Policy	Naokazu Takemoto	R	September 11, 2019 – September 16, 2020
Minister of State for Economic and Fiscal Policy; Minister in charge of Social Security Reform; Minister in charge of TPP and Japan-U.S. Trade Negotiations	Yasutoshi Nishimura	R	September 11, 2019 – September 16, 2020
Minister of State for Regional Revitalization; Minister of State for Regulatory Reform	Seigo Kitamura	R	September 11, 2019 – September 16, 2020
Minister of State for the Tokyo Olympic and Paralympic Games; Minister in charge of Women's Empowerment; Minister of State for Gender Equality	Seiko Hashimoto	C	September 11, 2019 – September 16, 2020
Deputy Chief Cabinet Secretaries
Deputy Chief Cabinet Secretary (Political Affairs – House of Representatives)	Akihiro Nishimura	R	September 11, 2019 – September 16, 2020
Deputy Chief Cabinet Secretary (Political Affairs – House of Councillors)	Naoki Okada	C	September 11, 2019 – October 4, 2021
Deputy Chief Cabinet Secretary (Bureaucrat)	Kazuhiro Sugita	–	December 26, 2012 – October 4, 2021

==== Changes ====
- October 25, 2019 – Economy, Trade and Industry Minister Isshu Sugawara resigned and was replaced by Hiroshi Kajiyama.
- October 31, 2019 – Justice Minister Katsuyuki Kawai resigned and was replaced by Masako Mori.

Preceded by Third Abe cabinet	Cabinet of Japan; 2017–2020	Succeeded by Suga cabinet
