= Hokkaido 11th district =

Single-member constituency of the Japanese House of Representatives

Hokkaidō 11th District
- Parliamentary constituency for the Japanese House of Representatives
- Numbered map of Hokkaidō Prefecture single-member districts
- Prefecture: Hokkaidō
- Proportional District: Hokkaidō
- Electorate: 271,981 (2026)

Current constituency
- Created: 1994
- Seats: One
- Party: Liberal Democratic Party
- Representative: Koichi Nakagawa
- Created from: Hokkaidō's 5th "medium-sized" district
- Municipalities: Obihiro and Tokachi Subprefecture

Hokkaidō 11th district (北海道[第]11区, Hokkaidō-[dai-]jūikku) is a single-member constituency of the House of Representatives, the lower house of the national Diet of Japan. It is located in southeastern Hokkaidō and consists of the city of Obihiro and the surrounding Tokachi Subprefecture. As of 2016, 291,852 eligible voters were registered in the district. The district is the country's second largest in terms of area after the neighbouring 12th district.

The district has been represented by Kaori Ishikawa of the Constitutional Democratic Party since the 2017 general election, when she defeated the incumbent member Yūko Nakagawa from the Liberal Democratic Party. Both are incidentally the spouse of former members of the district. Ishikawa is married to Tomohiro Ishikawa, who was an MP for the district from 2009 until his defeat to Yūko Nakagawa in the 2012 general election. Nakagawa is married to former member and Finance Minister Shōichi Nakagawa.

== Background ==
The 11th district and its predecessor had been long dubbed as the "Nakagawa Kingdom" due to continuous winning streak by politicians from the Nakagawa family in the district. The district (when still part of the medium-sized 5th district) was won seven consecutive times from 1963 by former minister and LDP heavyweight Ichirō Nakagawa. After Nakagawa's suicide in 1983, his son Shōichi won the district in the subsequent by-election. Shōichi continued to hold the district after the 1996 electoral reforms that introduced parallel voting and smaller single-member districts. He won the district for a total of eight consecutive times until the 2009 general election. Nakagawa was defeated by DPJ candidate Tomohiro Ishikawa, ending his family's 46-year dominance in the district. He killed himself in October the same year. His widow, Yūko managed to regain the district in the 2012 election, holding it until her defeat in 2017 to Tomohiro's wife Kaori.

== List of representatives ==
| Representative | Party | Dates | Notes |
|---|---|---|---|
| Shōichi Nakagawa | LDP | 1996 – 2009 | Also lost in the PR block |
| Tomohiro Ishikawa | DPJ | 2009 – 2010 | |
| Tomohiro Ishikawa | Ind | 2010 – 2011 | |
| Tomohiro Ishikawa | NPD | 2011 – 2012 | |
| Yūko Nakagawa | LDP | 2012 – 2017 | Also lost in the PR block |
| Kaori Ishikawa | CDP | 2017 – 2026 | Also lost in the PR block |
| Koichi Nakagawa | LDP | 2026 – | |

== Election results ==
2026
| Party | Candidate | Votes | % | ±% |
|---|---|---|---|---|
| LDP | Koichi Nakagawa (endorsed by Ishin) | 86,019 | 50.1 | ▲8.76 |
| Centrist Reform | Kaori Ishikawa | 72,951 | 42.5 | ▼9.75 |
| Sanseitō | Takashi Uto | 12,613 | 7.4 | |
| Turnout | | 171,583 | 64.07 | ▲4.17 |
| LDP gain from Centrist Reform | | | | |

2024
| Party | Candidate | Votes | % | ±% |
|---|---|---|---|---|
| CDP | Kaori Ishikawa | 84,552 | 52.25 | ▲0.5 |
| LDP | Yūko Nakagawa (endorsed by Kōmeitō and NPD) | 66,877 | 41.34 | ▼6.91 |
| JCP | Kōhei Satō | 10,367 | 6.41 | ▼4.56 |
| Turnout | | | 59.90 | ▼3.61 |
| CDP hold | | | | |

2021
| Party | Candidate | Votes | % | ±% |
|---|---|---|---|---|
| CDP | Kaori Ishikawa | 91,538 | 51.75 | ▼2.72 |
| LDP | Yūko Nakagawa (endorsed by Kōmeitō and NPD) (Elected via PR) | 85,336 | 48.25 | ▲2.72 |
| Majority | | | 3.50 | ▼5.44 |
| Turnout | | | 63.51 | ▼0.28 |
| CDP hold | | Swing | ▼2.72 | |

2017
| Party | Candidate | Votes | % | ±% |
|---|---|---|---|---|
| CDP | Kaori Ishikawa (Note: The CDP is the successor party of the DPJ in this district, therefore the voting figures of the DPJ candidate in the previous election are used as a reference.) | 98,214 | 54.47 | ▲17.66 |
| LDP | Yūko Nakagawa (endorsed by Kōmeitō and NPD) | 82,096 | 45.53 | ▼6.69 |
| Majority | | 16,105 | 8.94 | |
| Turnout | | | 63.79 | ▲4.15 |
| CDP gain from LDP | | Swing | ▲12.18 | |

2014
| Party | Candidate | Votes | % | ±% |
|---|---|---|---|---|
| LDP | Yūko Nakagawa | 87,118 | 52.22 | ▲1.23 |
| Democratic | Takeo Mitsu (Note: The DPJ is the successor party of the NPD in this district, therefore the voting figures of the NPD candidate in the previous election are used as a reference.) | 61,405 | 36.81 | ▼4.42 |
| JCP | Yōsuke Hatanaka | 18,303 | 10.97 | ▲3.19 |
| Majority | | 25,713 | 15.41 | |
| Turnout | | | 59.64 | ▼1.35 |
| LDP hold | | Swing | ▲2.84 | |

2012
| Party | Candidate | Votes | % | ±% |
|---|---|---|---|---|
| LDP | Yūko Nakagawa | 86,719 | 50.99 | ▲10.09 |
| NP-Daichi | Tomohiro Ishikawa (elected by PR) | 70,112 | 41.23 | ▼12.80 |
| JCP | Yukari Watanabe | 13,235 | 7.78 | ▲2.71 |
| Majority | | 16,607 | 9.76 | |
| Turnout | | | 60.99 | |
| LDP gain from NP-Daichi | | Swing | ▲11.45 | |

2009
| Party | Candidate | Votes | % | ±% |
|---|---|---|---|---|
| Democratic | Tomohiro Ishikawa | 118,655 | 54.03 | ▲13.31 |
| LDP | Shōichi Nakagawa | 89,818 | 40.90 | ▼10.61 |
| JCP | Yukari Watanabe | 11,140 | 5.07 | ▼2.70 |
| Majority | | 28,847 | 13.13 | |
| Democratic gain from LDP | | Swing | ▲11.96 | |

2005
| Party | Candidate | Votes | % | ±% |
|---|---|---|---|---|
| LDP | Shōichi Nakagawa | 107,506 | 51.51 | |
| Democratic | Tomohiro Ishikawa | 84,626 | 40.72 | |
| JCP | Akio Hasebe | 16,145 | 7.77 | |

2003
| Party | Candidate | Votes | % | ±% |
|---|---|---|---|---|
| LDP | Shōichi Nakagawa | 112,210 | 62.0 | |
| Social Democratic | Keiko Yamauchi | 52,395 | 29.0 | |
| JCP | Akio Hasebe | 16,235 | 9.0 | |

2000
| Party | Candidate | Votes | % | ±% |
|---|---|---|---|---|
| LDP | Shōichi Nakagawa | 112,297 | 57.7 | |
| Democratic | Motoko Ideta | 57,486 | 29.6 | |
| JCP | Sōji Asanuma | 24,717 | 12.7 | |

1996
| Party | Candidate | Votes | % | ±% |
|---|---|---|---|---|
| LDP | Shōichi Nakagawa | 97,428 | 53.5 | |
| Democratic | Ryūji Ikemoto | 67,250 | 37.0 | |
| JCP | Itoe Satō | 17,319 | 9.5 | |
