= Tomohiro Ishikawa =

Japanese politician (1973–2025)

- 石川知裕

Member of the House of Representatives
- In office 23 September 2007 – 21 May 2013
- Preceded by: Satoshi Arai
- Succeeded by: Takako Suzuki
- Constituency: Hokkaido PR (2007–2009); Hokkaido 11th (2009–2012); Hokkaido PR (2012–2013)

Personal details
- Born: 18 June 1973 Ashoro, Hokkaido, Japan
- Died: 6 September 2025 (aged 52) Chiyoda, Tokyo, Japan
- Party: Democratic (2005–2010; 2015–2016)
- Other political affiliations: Independent (2010–2011; 2013–2015); NPD (2011–2013); DP (2016–2017); CDP (2017–2025)
- Spouse: Kaori Ishikawa (m. 2011)
- Children: 2
- Education: Waseda University; Hosei University
- Website: Official website

Tomohiro Ishikawa (石川 知裕, Ishikawa Tomohiro; 18 June 1973 – 6 September 2025) was a Japanese politician who was member of the House of Representatives elected to the 11th District of Hokkaidō. He was a secretary to former Democratic Party of Japan (DPJ) Secretary-General Ichirō Ozawa. After Satoshi Arai's candidacy to the 2007 Hokkaido gubernatorial election, Ishikawa took up the seat vacated by Arai through the PR list. In the 2009 DPJ landslide, Ishikawa famously unseated then-incumbent Finance Minister Shōichi Nakagawa.

In 2010, Ishikawa was embroiled in a political funding scandal involving Ichirō Ozawa. He allegedly failed to record 400 million yen he and other secretaries borrowed from Ozawa to buy land in Tokyo. After he was indicted in February 2010, he resigned from the DPJ and sat in the House as an independent. Ishikawa retained his seat during the appeal process. He joined New Party Daichi in 2011 and contested the 2012 election under their banner. He was defeated in his seat by Yūko Nakagawa, who is married to Shōichi Nakagawa. However, he returned to the House though the NPD's PR list.

His legal issues led him to resign from his seat in May 2013, when he decided to fully focus on his appeal to the Supreme Court. He was replaced by NPD leader Muneo Suzuki's daughter Takako, who was next in line in the PR list. His appeal was rejected by the Supreme Court in September 2014 and he was sentenced to two years in prison, suspended for three years.

Ishikawa had limited involvement in politics since then. He returned to the DPJ in 2015. He completed a master's course at Hosei University in 2016, majoring in political science. As part of the degree, he conducted a comparative study between the New Labour reforms of British Prime Minister Tony Blair and the DPJ.

In the 2017 election, Ishikawa's wife Kaori was elected to his former 11th district seat, defeating Yūko Nakagawa.

Ishikawa died of colorectal cancer on 6 September 2025, at the age of 52.
