= Muneo Suzuki =

Japanese politician (born 1948)

- 鈴木 宗男
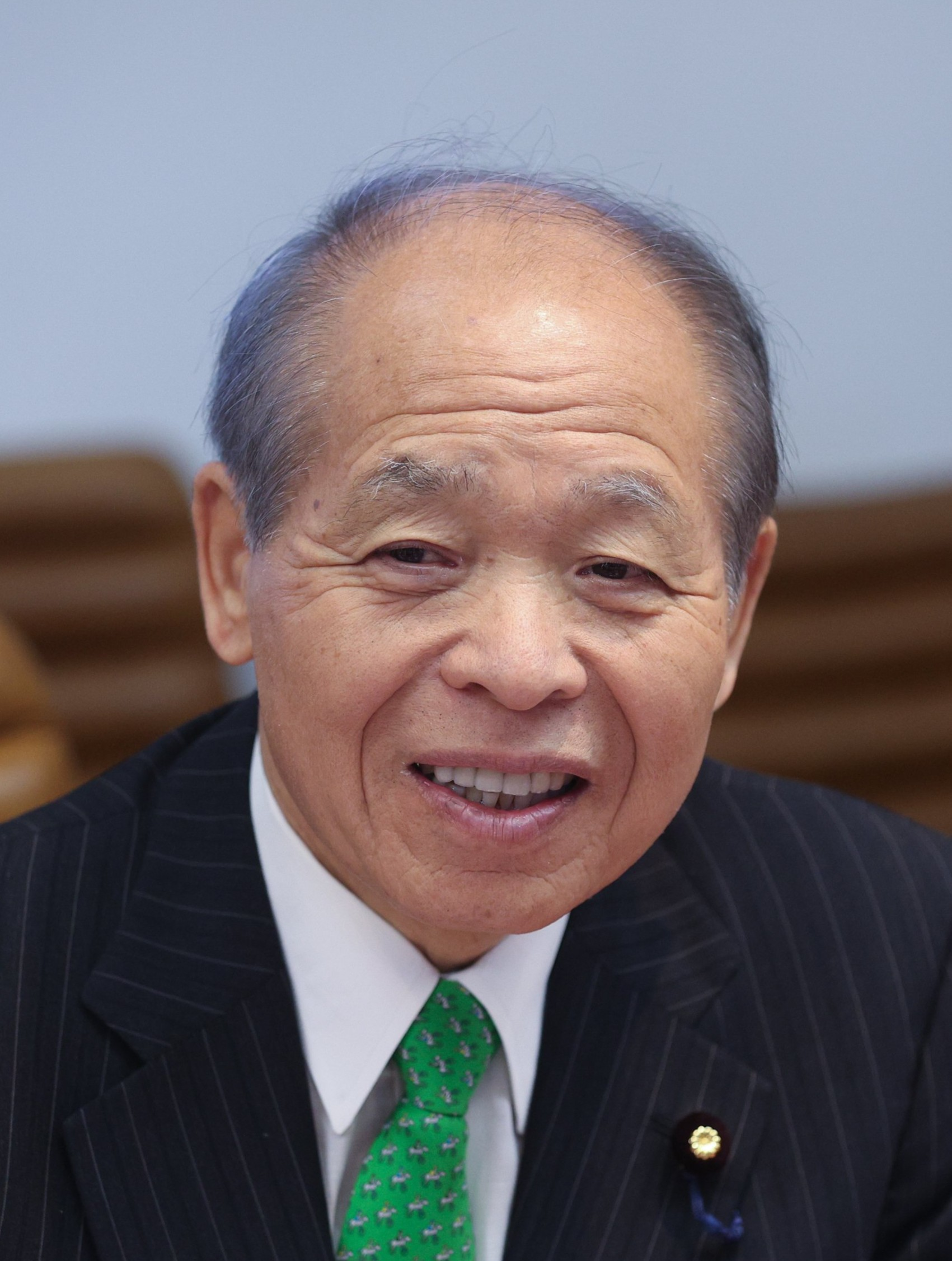
- Suzuki in 2024

Leader of New Party Daichi
- Incumbent
- Assumed office 18 August 2005
- Preceded by: Position established

Deputy Chief Cabinet Secretary (Political affairs, House of Representatives)
- In office 30 July 1998 – 5 October 1999
- Prime Minister: Keizō Obuchi
- Preceded by: Fukushiro Nukaga
- Succeeded by: Fukushiro Nukaga

Minister of State for Okinawa and Northern Territories Affairs
- In office 11 September 1997 – 30 July 1998
- Prime Minister: Ryutaro Hashimoto
- Preceded by: Jitsuo Inagaki
- Succeeded by: Kichio Inoue

Member of the House of Councillors
- Incumbent
- Assumed office 28 July 2025
- Constituency: National PR
- In office 29 July 2019 – 20 June 2025
- Constituency: National PR

Member of the House of Representatives
- In office 12 June 2005 – 15 September 2010
- Preceded by: Takafumi Yamashita
- Succeeded by: Takahiro Asano
- Constituency: Hokkaido PR
- In office 19 December 1983 – 10 October 2003
- Preceded by: Yasuda Kiroku
- Succeeded by: Gaku Ishizaki
- Constituency: Hokkaido 5th (1983–1996); Hokkaido PR (1996–2003)

Personal details
- Born: 31 January 1948 (age 78) Ashoro, Hokkaido, Japan
- Party: LDP (1983–2002; 2025–present); NPD (2005–present)
- Other political affiliations: Ishin (2019–2023)
- Spouse: Noriko Suzuki
- Children: 3, including Takako Suzuki
- Education: Takushoku University
- Website: Official blog

Muneo Suzuki (鈴木 宗男 Suzuki Muneo, born 31 January 1948), commonly known simply as "Muneo" due to his common last name, is a Japanese politician from Ashoro, Hokkaido, currently serving as a member of the House of Councillors since 2019, representing the National PR block.

== Early career ==
He graduated from the Department of Political Science at Takushoku University in 1970, and before he graduated he began working for Ichirō Nakagawa, a Japanese member of the House of Representatives. Nakagawa committed suicide in a hotel in January 1983 for unknown reasons. Suzuki hoped to run for his seat, but Ichirō's son Shōichi Nakagawa, a Tokyo native, moved to Hokkaido to run for his father's seat, and Suzuki successfully ran for a seat in a neighboring district. He was elected in December 1983 as a member of the Liberal Democratic Party (LDP).

He was appointed Head of the Hokkaido Development Agency and the Okinawa Development Agency in 1997 and later as Vice Minister of the Cabinet of Prime Minister Keizō Obuchi.

=== Scandal and criminal convictions ===
In 1999, while Suzuki was the Deputy Chief Cabinet Secretary to the former Prime Minister Obuchi, he pressured the Foreign Ministry to fund the Japanese-Russia Friendship House (nicknamed the "Muneo House" by locals), which became a scandal in 2002 when it was revealed.

He left the LDP in 2002 and was arrested later that year for suspicion of accepting bribes from two Hokkaido companies. He did not run for reelection in the 2003 elections on the stated grounds that he was undergoing surgery to treat stomach cancer. His secretary Akira Miyano was convicted of bribery in 2003, and Muneo was convicted of taking the bribes, failure to declare political donations, and perjury and sentenced to two years in prison and fined ¥11 million in November 2004. He remained free and in office as he appealed the conviction.

Muneo ran for the House of Councillors in 2004. He was defeated, but ran successfully for the House of Representatives of Japan in the 11 September 2005 elections after forming the New Party Daichi. He is the only elected member of the party.

On 7 September 2010, the Supreme Court of Japan unanimously upheld Suzuki's conviction and sentence. In response, Suzuki stated that he would file a complaint against the ruling. As the complaint was rejected, Suzuki was removed from office and the fine and prison sentence took effect. He was also banned from running for public office for five years after completion of the prison sentence. Suzuki was paroled on 6 December 2011 after serving one year in prison in Tochigi Prefecture.

== Later career ==
His ban from public office expired on 30 April 2017, allowing him to run again for election. He ran in the 2017 general election as the head of the NPD list for the Hokkaido PR block but was not elected. He ran again in the 2019 House of Councillors election on the National PR list for the Nippon Ishin no Kai. He won the most votes on the party's list and was thus elected for the first time since being removed from office in 2010.

On 11 October 2023, Suzuki resigned from Nippon Ishin no Kai following calls for his expulsion from the party after he visited Russia during the Russo-Ukrainian war. He stated, "I believe in Russia's victory" and "This war occurred because Zelenskyy did not adhere to the Minsk agreements."

Suzuki resigned from the House of Councillors on 20 June 2025. On the same day, he was reinstated as a member of the Liberal Democratic Party, rejoining after 23 years. Resignation from the Diet is legally required for switching parties if elected in the proportional block. On the following day, he announced his candidacy in the proportional block on the LDP list for the 2025 House of Councillors election. He announced his retirement from politics in the morning of July 21, when he was expected to lose the election. He was elected a few hours later.

== Political positions ==
- As an elected member of the Hokkaido Assembly, he has been advocating for the rights of the Ainu people.
