= Yokomine =

Yokomine is a Japanese surname. Notable people with the surname include:

- Sakura Yokomine (born 1985), Japanese golfer
- Yoshiro Yokomine (born 1960), Japanese politician
