= Uruma (disambiguation) =

Uruma is a city in Okinawa Prefecture, Japan. Uruma may also refer to

- Uruma Delvi, a contemporary Japanese husband and wife singing duo
- Iwao Uruma (杉田 和博, born 1945), Japanese police officer
- Tomeju Uruma (潤間 留十, 1902–1999), Japanese speed skater
- Mordellina uruma, a species of beetle
