= Yūko Nakagawa =

Japanese politician

- 中川 郁子
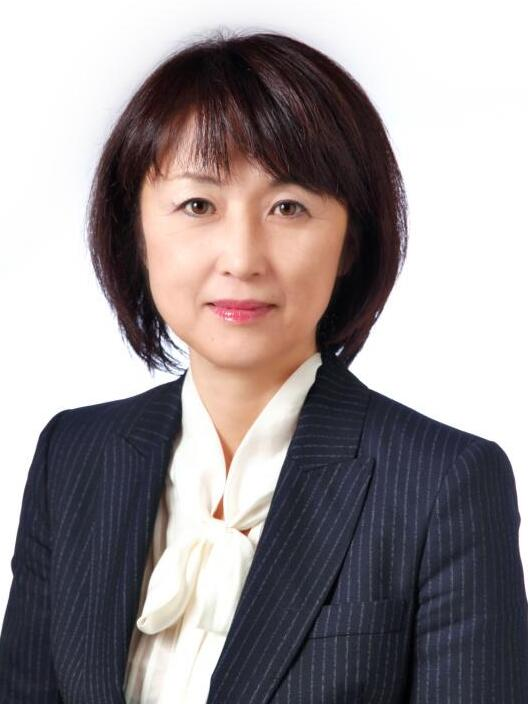
- Official portrait, 2014

Member of the House of Representatives
- In office 5 November 2021 – 9 October 2024
- Constituency: Hokkaido PR
- In office 17 December 2012 – 28 September 2017
- Preceded by: Tomohiro Ishikawa
- Succeeded by: Kaori Ishikawa
- Constituency: Hokkaido 11th

Personal details
- Born: 22 December 1958 (age 67) Niigata Prefecture, Japan
- Party: Liberal Democratic
- Spouse: Shōichi Nakagawa (m. 1982; died 2009)
- Relatives: Ichiro Nakagawa (father-in-law); Koichi Nakagawa (nephew)
- Education: University of the Sacred Heart

Yūko Nakagawa (中川郁子, Nakagawa Yūko; née Iwata, born 22 December 1958) is a Japanese politician in the Liberal Democratic Party (LDP). She represented Hokkaido in the House of Representatives from 2012 to 2017. Her husband, Shōichi Nakagawa, was also a politician, serving as Minister of Finance of Japan in 2008 and 2009. Nakagawa was born in Niigata Prefecture and graduated from University of the Sacred Heart in 1981. She worked at Mitsubishi for a year until her marriage to Shōichi, and moved to Hokkaido shortly afterward.

After Shōichi's death in 2009, Yūko began to get involved in politics. In the 2012 election, she ran in Hokkaido's 11th district against Tomohiro Ishikawa, who had defeated her husband for the position in the last election; she won with 51 percent of the vote. During her time in the House, she served on the Agriculture, Forestry and Fisheries Committee, and was appointed as parliamentary minister of the committee in 2014. In her role as minister, she spoke out in opposition to the Trans-Pacific Partnership.

After being re-elected in the 2014 election, Nakagawa came under controversy in March 2015, when a photograph was released where she was kissing fellow politician Hirofumi Kado; Nakagawa later apologized for the incident, and LDP President Shinzo Abe offered his continued support after the leak. She was challenged by Kaori Ishikawa, Tomohiro's wife, in the 2017 election. She lost, 54.5 to 45.5 percent, and the kiss with Kado was considered by the media to be the primary reason why she was defeated.

Nakagawa narrowly regained a seat in the 2021 election. She was defeated in the 2024 election.
