= Mineichi =

Mineichi (written 峯一) is a masculine Japanese given name. Notable people with the name include:

- Mineichi Koga (古賀 峯一, 1885–1944), Japanese fleet admiral and commander-in-chief of the Imperial Japanese Navy
- Mineichi Iwanaga (岩永 峯一, born 1941), Japanese politician
