= Teijirō Furukawa =

Japanese official

- 古川 貞二郎
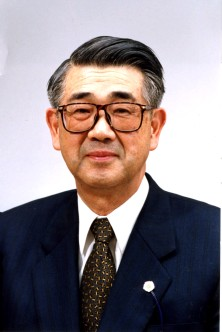
- Official portrait, 2004

Deputy Chief Cabinet Secretary (Administrative affairs)
- In office 24 February 1995 – 22 September 2003
- Prime Minister: Tomiichi Murayama; Ryutaro Hashimoto; Keizo Obuchi; Yoshiro Mori; Junichiro Koizumi
- Preceded by: Nobuo Ishihara
- Succeeded by: Masahiro Futahashi

Personal details
- Born: 11 September 1934 Yamato, Saga, Japan
- Died: 5 September 2022 (aged 87) Tokyo, Japan
- Education: Kyushu University

Teijirō Furukawa (古川 貞二郎, Furukawa Teijirō; 11 September 1934 – 5 September 2022) was a Japanese official who served as Deputy Chief Cabinet Secretary from 1995 to 2003. As such he was the senior bureaucrat under five Prime Ministers. Before that he served as Administrative Vice Minister of Health and Welfare from 1993 to 1994.

== Early life ==
Teijirō Furukawa was born on 11 September 1934, to a family of farmers in Kasuga Village in Saga Prefecture. After attending high school in Saga, Furukawa enrolled in Saga University, but after one year he transferred to Kyushu University, where he studied law. Furukawa failed the national civil service examination while in university.

After graduating in 1958, Furukawa began working for the Nagasaki Prefectural Government. In September the following year he passed the national civil service examination and in January 1960 he joined the Ministry of Health and Welfare.

== Bureaucratic career ==
Furukawa held several position within the ministry before being seconded to the Cabinet Secretariat in June 1986, as Chief Cabinet Counsellor (首席内閣参事官, Shuseki Naikaku Sanjikan). In this position he was involved in preparations for the funeral of Emperor Hirohito (r. 1926–1989) and the changeover to the Heisei era.

Furukawa returned to the Ministry as chief of the Children and Families Bureau in June 1989. In June the following year he was appointed chief secretary of the Minister's Secretariat and in July 1992 he became chief of the Insurance Bureau. In June 1993 Furukawa was appointed Administrative Vice Minister of Health and Welfare. He retired in September 1994.

In February 1995 Furukawa was appointed Deputy Chief Cabinet Secretary for administrative affairs, to succeed Nobuo Ishihara who was retiring to run in the 1995 Tokyo gubernatorial election. Immediately after his appointment Furukawa was in charge of inter-ministerial coordination for recovery after the Great Hanshin earthquake. He oversaw the planning and implementation of the 2001 central government reform and the building of the new Prime Minister's Office from 1999 to 2002.

He retired in September 2003, having served five Prime Ministers: Tomiichi Murayama, Ryutaro Hashimoto, Keizo Obuchi, Yoshiro Mori and Junichiro Koizumi. His tenure of eight years and seven months was the longest in history until Kazuhiro Sugita set a new record in July 2021.

Teijirō Furukawa died of sepsis on 5 September 2022, in a Tokyo hospital at the age of 87.
