= Kaori Ishikawa =

Japanese politician (born 1984)

- 石川かおり
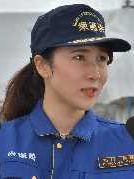
- Ishikawa in 2022

Member of the House of Representatives
- In office 1 November 2017 – 23 January 2026
- Preceded by: Yūko Nakagawa
- Succeeded by: Koichi Nakagawa
- Constituency: Hokkaido 11th

Personal details
- Born: 10 May 1984 (age 42) Yokohama, Kanagawa, Japan
- Party: CRA (since 2026)
- Other political affiliations: CDP (until 2026)
- Spouse: Tomohiro Ishikawa (m. 2011; died 2025)
- Children: 2
- Education: University of the Sacred Heart
- Website: Official website

Kaori Ishikawa (石川かおり, Ishikawa Kaori; born 10 May 1984) is a member of the Constitutional Democratic Party in the House of Representatives, representing Hokkaido's 11th district after being elected for the first time. She was an analyst for Nippon BS Broadcasting before meeting her husband, Tomohiro Ishikawa, with whom she has two children. Ishikawa was born in Yokohama and graduated from the University of the Sacred Heart.
