= Suga cabinet =

99th Cabinet of Japan (2020–2021)

- 99th Cabinet of Japan
- 16 September 2020 – 4 October 2021
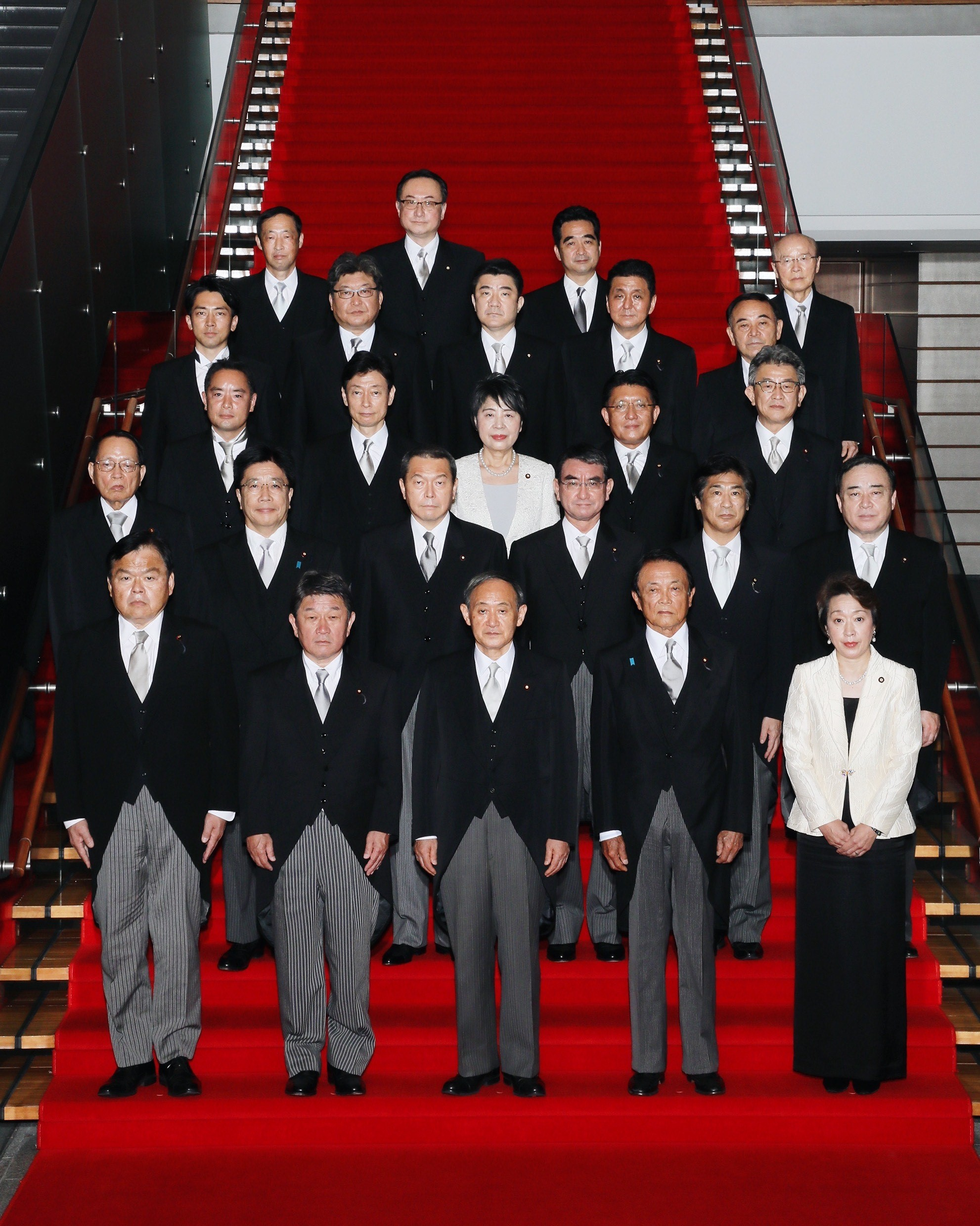
- Prime Minister Yoshihide Suga (front row, centre) with the newly-elected cabinet inside the Kantei, September 16, 2020
- Date formed: September 16, 2020
- Date dissolved: October 4, 2021

People and organisations
- Emperor: Naruhito
- Head of government: Yoshihide Suga
- Head of government's history: Member of the HoR for Kanagawa 2nd district (1996–present); Minister for Internal Affairs and Communications (2006–2007); Chief Cabinet Secretary (2012–2020)
- Deputy head of government: Tarō Asō
- Total no. of members: 27
- Member party: Liberal Democratic Party; Komeito
- Status in legislature: Coalition government HoR (Lower): Supermajority; HoC (Upper): Majority
- Opposition party: Constitutional Democratic Party
- Opposition leader: Yukio Edano

History
- Predecessor: Abe IV
- Successor: Kishida I

The Suga cabinet governed Japan under the leadership of Prime Minister Yoshihide Suga from 16 September 2020 to 4 October 2021. The government was a coalition between the Liberal Democratic Party and the Komeito and controlled both the upper and lower houses of the National Diet.

Following his resignation, the Suga cabinet was dissolved on October 4, 2021, and replaced with the First Kishida cabinet after being in office for 384 days.

== Election of the prime minister ==
16 September 2020 Absolute majority (233/465) required
House of Representatives
Choice	First Vote
Choice	Votes
Yoshihide Suga	314 / 465
Yukio Edano	134 / 465
Toranosuke Katayama	11 / 465
Nariaki Nakayama	2 / 465
Shinjiro Koizumi	1 / 465
Abstentions/vacant	3 / 465

16 September 2020 Absolute majority (123/245) required
House of Councillors
Choice	First Vote
Choice	Votes
Yoshihide Suga	142 / 245
Yukio Edano	78 / 245
Toranosuke Katayama	16 / 245
Takae Itō	1 / 245
Blank	3 / 245
Abstentions/vacant	5 / 245

== Lists of ministers ==
Liberal Democratic
Komeito
R = Member of the House of Representatives
C = Member of the House of Councillors
B = Bureaucrat

=== Cabinet ===
Suga Cabinet
Portfolio	Minister		Term	Note
Prime Minister	Yoshihide Suga	R	September 16, 2020 – October 4, 2021	
Deputy Prime Minister; Minister of Finance; Minister of State for Financial Services; Minister in charge of Overcoming Deflation	Tarō Asō	R	December 26, 2012 – October 4, 2021	
Minister for Internal Affairs and Communications	Ryota Takeda	R	September 16, 2020 – October 4, 2021	
Minister of Justice	Yōko Kamikawa	R	September 16, 2020 – October 4, 2021	
Minister for Foreign Affairs	Toshimitsu Motegi	R	September 11, 2019 – October 4, 2021	
Minister of Defense	Nobuo Kishi	R	September 16, 2020 – October 4, 2021	
Minister of Education, Culture, Sports, Science and Technology; Minister in charge of Education Rebuilding	Koichi Hagiuda	R	September 11, 2019 – October 4, 2021	
Minister of Health, Labour and Welfare; Minister in charge of Working-style Reform	Norihisa Tamura	R	September 16, 2020 – October 4, 2021	
Minister of Agriculture, Forestry and Fisheries	Kōtarō Nogami	C	September 16, 2020 – October 4, 2021	
Minister of Economy, Trade and Industry; Minister in charge of Industrial Competitiveness; Minister for Economic Cooperation with Russia; Minister in charge of the Response to the Economic Impact caused by the Nuclear Accident; Minister of State for the Nuclear Damage Compensation and Decommissioning Facilitation Corporation	Hiroshi Kajiyama	R	October 25, 2019 – October 4, 2021	
Minister of Land, Infrastructure, Transport and Tourism; Minister in charge of Water Cycle Policy	Kazuyoshi Akaba	R	September 11, 2019 – October 4, 2021	
Minister of the Environment; Minister of State for Nuclear Emergency Preparedness; Minister in charge of climate change (since March 9, 2021)	Shinjiro Koizumi	R	September 11, 2019 – October 4, 2021	
Chief Cabinet Secretary; Minister in charge of Mitigating the Impact of U.S. Forces in Okinawa; Minister in charge of the Abductions Issue	Katsunobu Katō	R	September 16, 2020 – October 4, 2021	
Minister of Reconstruction; Minister in charge of Comprehensive Policy Coordination for Revival from the Nuclear Accident at Fukushima	Katsuei Hirasawa	R	September 16, 2020 – October 4, 2021	
Chairperson of the National Public Safety Commission; Minister in charge of Building National Resilience; Minister in charge of Territorial Issues; Minister of State for Disaster Management; Minister of State for Ocean Policy	Hachiro Okonogi	R	September 16, 2020 – June 25, 2021	
Chairperson of the National Public Safety Commission; Minister in charge of Building National Resilience; Minister in charge of Territorial Issues; Minister of State for Disaster Management; Minister of State for Ocean Policy	Yasufumi Tanahashi	R	June 25, 2021 – October 4, 2021	
Minister in charge of Administrative Reform; Minister in charge of Civil Service Reform; Minister of State for Okinawa and Northern Territories Affairs; Minister of State for Regulatory Reform; Minister in charge of COVID-19 Vaccination (since January 18, 2021)	Tarō Kōno	R	September 16, 2020 – October 4, 2021	
Minister for Promoting Dynamic Engagement of All Citizens; Minister in charge of Regional Revitalization; Minister of State for Measures for Declining Birthrate; Minister of State for Regional Revitalization; Minister of Loneliness (since February 12, 2021)	Tetsushi Sakamoto	R	September 16, 2020 – October 4, 2021	
Minister of State for Economic and Fiscal Policy; Minister in charge of Economic Revitalization; Minister in charge of Social Security Reform	Yasutoshi Nishimura	R	September 11, 2019 – October 4, 2021	
Minister for Digital Transformation Minister of State for the Social Security and Tax Number System; Minister in charge of Digital Transformation; Minister in charge of Information Technology Policy	Takuya Hirai	R	September 16, 2020 – October 4, 2021	
Minister of State for the Tokyo Olympic and Paralympic Games; Minister in charge of Women's Empowerment; Minister of State for Gender Equality	Seiko Hashimoto	C	September 11, 2019 – February 18, 2021	
Minister of State for the Tokyo Olympic and Paralympic Games; Minister in charge of Women's Empowerment; Minister of State for Gender Equality	Tamayo Marukawa	C	February 18, 2021 – October 4, 2021	
Minister in charge of the Osaka World Expo; Minister of State for Consumer Affairs and Food Safety; Minister of State for "Cool Japan" Strategy; Minister of State for the Intellectual Strategy; Minister of State for Science and Technology Policy; Minister of State for Space Policy	Shinji Inoue	R	September 16, 2020 – October 4, 2021	

=== Deputy Chief Cabinet Secretary and Director-General of the Cabinet Legislation Bureau ===
Suga Deputy Cabinet
Portfolio	Deputy Minister		Term	Note
Deputy Chief Cabinet Secretary	Manabu Sakai	R	September 16, 2020 – October 4, 2021	
Deputy Chief Cabinet Secretary	Naoki Okada	C	September 11, 2019 – October 4, 2021	
Deputy Chief Cabinet Secretary	Kazuhiro Sugita	B	December 26, 2012 – October 4, 2021	former: National Police Agency
Director-General of the Cabinet Legislation Bureau	Masaharu Kondo	B	September 11, 2019 – October 4, 2021	former: the Ministry of Economy, Trade and Industry

=== Special Adviser to the Prime Minister ===
Office of the Prime Minister
Portfolio	Adviser		Term	Note
Special Adviser to the Prime Minister for National Security	Minoru Kihara	R	September 11, 2019 – October 4, 2021	
Special Adviser to the Prime Minister for Diplomacy and Economic Issues	Masashi Adachi	C	September 16, 2020 – October 4, 2021	
Special Adviser to the Prime Minister for Social Capital Development, Regional Revitalization, National Resilience, Reconstruction, Health and Medical Care, Scientific and Technological Innovation	Hiroto Izumi	B	January 21, 2013 – October 4, 2021	from the Ministry of Land, Infrastructure, Transport and Tourism
Special Adviser to the Prime Minister in charge of Policy Evaluation and Verification	Meiji Kakizaki	B	October 1, 2020 – October 4, 2021	former journalist of Kyodo News

Preceded by Fourth Abe cabinet	Cabinet of Japan; 2020–2021	Succeeded by First Kishida cabinet
