= New Party Daichi =

New Party Daichi 新党大地 Shintō Daichi
- Leader: Muneo Suzuki
- Founder: Muneo Suzuki
- Founded: 18 August 2005; 20 years ago
- Ideology: Localism; Green conservatism
- Colors: Dark Green
- Councillors: 1 / 245
- Representatives: 0 / 465
- Prefectural assembly members: 0 / 2,598
- Municipal assembly members: 9 / 29,425

Website
- www.daichi.gr.jp

The New Party Daichi (新党大地; Shintō Daichi) is a Japanese political party. The party works based on jurisdiction and administrative divisions. The party's leader is Muneo Suzuki, a member of the House of Councillors who formerly caucused with the Nippon Ishin no Kai and was a Representative for the Liberal Democratic Party (LDP).

== History ==
Following his arrest on suspicion of accepting bribes, Suzuki resigned from the LDP in March 2002. Suzuki formed the New Party Daichi on 18 August 2005. Critical of Junichiro Koizumi's policies including privatization of the Japanese postal system, Suzuki, while on bail, announced the formation of The New Party Daichi. The party's earliest member of The National Diet (国会 Kokkai), Japan's bicameral legislature, was Suzuki's daughter, Takako Suzuki, in the House of Representatives (Hokkaidō proportional). In the 2014 election, she ran on the Democratic Party of Japan (DPJ) list; NPD did not compete. She left the DPJ again in 2016.

The New Party Daichi (Shinto Daichi) is categorized as a political organization (Seiji dantai) as it fulfills the Japanese laws regulating party funding and elections necessary to be recognized as a political party (seitō).

In the 2005 and 2009 general elections of the lower house, Muneo Suzuki was elected to a proportional seat in the Hokkaidō bloc. In 2010, when the Supreme Court ultimately confirmed his bribery conviction, Suzuki had to give up his seat to serve his prison term. He was replaced in the House of Representatives by proportional runner-up Takahiro Asano but remained party leader. In the 2007 regular election of the upper house, the party endorsed independent Ainu activist Kaori Tahara in Hokkaido (two-member district) who lost to the two major-party candidates. NPD did not contest the 2010 upper house election. In 2013, it fielded two prefectural (Hokkaido and Osaka) and nine proportional candidates, but failed to win a seat (14.7% of votes/rank 3 for Takahiro Asano in two-member Hokkaido, 1.5%/rank 7 for Mika Yoshiba in four-member Osaka, 1.0%/no seat in the 48-member proportional election).

In late December 2011, the party was joined by five Diet members (see below), and renamed to New Party Daichi—Shinminshu (新党大地・真民主, Shintō Daichi – Shinminshu; "New Party Daichi – True Democrats"). Because the party now had five members in the Diet and was founded before January 1, 2012, it was formally recognized as a political party in the legal sense in 2012. It became eligible to receive public party funding and other benefits such as nominating dual candidates in lower house elections. The party endorsed most district candidates from Ichirō Ozawa's DPJ-breakaway Tomorrow Party of Japan and did not compete in the proportional races. In Hokkaido, Daichi candidates – in turn, endorsed by TPJ – all lost their district races (including two incumbents), but the party won one proportional seat. Tomohiro Ishikawa ranked the highest and took the seat. In 2010, he resigned and was replaced by a proportional list runner-up Takako Suzuki.

Members of New Party Daichi – True Democrats were:

- Takahiro Asano (Rep. – Hokkaidō proportional, formerly New Party Daichi)
- Kenkō Matsuki (Rep. – Hokkaidō 12, formerly DPJ (Ozawa group), expelled from the party after his no-confidence vote against Naoto Kan)
- Tomohiro Ishikawa (Rep. – Hokkaidō 11, formerly DPJ (Ozawa group), had to leave the party as Ozawa's ex-secretary during the investigations against Ozawa)
- Yoshirō Yokomine (Coun. – national proportional, formerly DPJ)
- Makoto Hirayama (Coun. – national proportional, formerly New Party Nippon, then an independent member of the DPJ caucus)

Unlike the Kizuna party, New Party Daichi – True Democrats initially wanted to remain with the coalition majority. For a few weeks, their members remained with the DPJ caucus in the House of Counselors, but formed a separate caucus in February 2012 and eventually sided with the opposition to the DPJ-led coalition later in 2012.

The party reverted to its original name on November 28, 2012.
