= Koichi Nakagawa =

Japanese politician (born 1990)

- 中川 紘一

Member of the House of Representatives
- Incumbent
- Assumed office 9 February 2026
- Preceded by: Kaori Ishikawa
- Constituency: Hokkaido 11th

Personal details
- Born: 20 June 1990 (age 36)
- Party: Liberal Democratic
- Relatives: Ichiro Nakagawa (grandfather); Bunzo Nakagawa (great-grandfather); Shōichi Nakagawa (uncle); Yūko Nakagawa (aunt)
- Education: Waseda University

Koichi Nakagawa (中川紘一, Nakagawa Koichi; born 20 June 1990) is a Japanese politician serving as a member of the House of Representatives since 2026. He is the grandson of Ichiro Nakagawa and the nephew of Shōichi Nakagawa and Yūko Nakagawa.
