= Takako Suzuki =

Japanese politician

- 鈴木 貴子
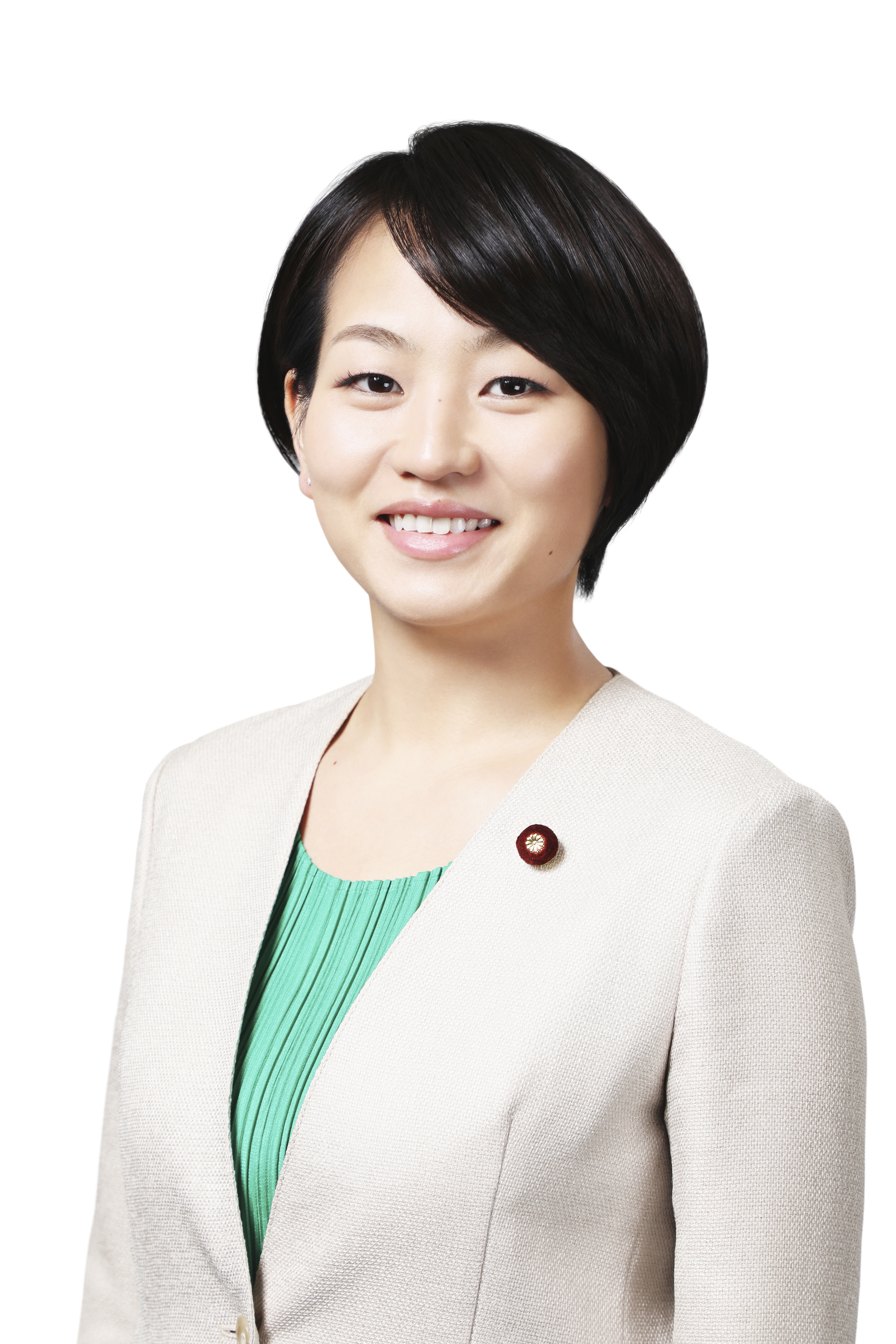
- Official portrait, 2020

Member of the House of Representatives
- Incumbent
- Assumed office 3 June 2013
- Preceded by: Tomohiro Ishikawa
- Constituency: Hokkaido PR (2013–2024); Hokkaido 7th (2024–present)

Personal details
- Born: 5 January 1986 (age 40) Obihiro, Hokkaido, Japan
- Party: LDP (since 2017)
- Other political affiliations: NPD (2012–2014; 2016–2017); DPJ (2014–2016)
- Children: 1
- Parent: Muneo Suzuki (father)
- Education: Trent University (B.A)
- Website: suzukitakako.jp

Takako Suzuki (鈴木 貴子, Suzuki Takako; born 5 January 1986) is a Japanese politician from the Liberal Democratic Party of Japan (LDP) and a member of the House of Representatives in the Diet (national legislature).

== Political career ==
She represented Hokkaido through the proportional representation block from 2013 to 2024, and has been representing Hokkaido 7th district since 2024. She was previously a member of the Democratic Party of Japan and New Party Daichi.

== Personal life ==
Suzuki is the daughter of veteran Hokkaido politician Muneo Suzuki. She graduated with a B.A. in International Politics from Trent University in Canada and worked as a television director at NHK before entering politics.

She is married to a cameraman friend who went to the same elementary school with her. Their first child was born in September 2017.
