= Shun'ichi Kuryu =

Japanese official

- 栗生 俊一
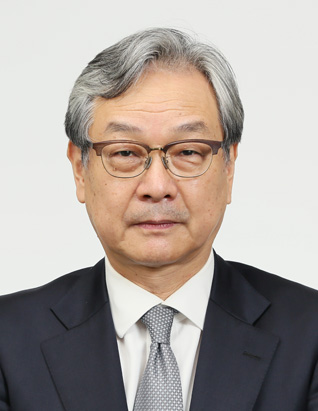
- Official portrait, 2021

Deputy Chief Cabinet Secretary (Administrative affairs)
- In office 4 October 2021 – 1 October 2024
- Prime Minister: Fumio Kishida
- Preceded by: Kazuhiro Sugita
- Succeeded by: Fumitoshi Satō

Personal details
- Born: 6 December 1958 (age 67) Tokyo, Japan
- Education: University of Tokyo

Shun'ichi Kuryu (栗生 俊一, Kuryu Shun'ichi; born 6 December 1958) is a Japanese police officer who served as Deputy Chief Cabinet Secretary from 2021 to 2024. He previously served as Commissioner General of the National Police Agency from 2018 to 2020.

== Career ==
Shun'ichi Kuryu was born in Tokyo on December 6, 1958. He studied law at the University of Tokyo and joined the National Police Agency after graduating in 1981. As a police officer, he worked mainly in the field of criminal investigation and countermeasures against organized crime. Kuryu was also seconded to the Ministry of Foreign Affairs and worked at the Japanese embassies in India and the United States.

Kuryu was chief of the Tokushima Prefectural police from August 2005 to August 2007. He was assigned as administrative secretary to Prime Minister Yasuo Fukuda when he took office in September 2007 until he resigned in September 2008.

Kuryu became chief of the Criminal Affairs Bureau in January 2014, chief secretary of the Commissioner General's Secretariat in January 2015, Deputy Commissioner General in August 2016, and finally Commissioner General of the National Police Agency in January 2018. He served in this position for two years before retiring in January 2020.

In October 2021, Kuryu was appointed Deputy Chief Cabinet Secretary for administrative affair under Prime Minister Fumio Kishida. He was replaced when Shigeru Ishiba succeeded Kishida in October 2024.

Government offices
Preceded by Masayoshi Sakaguchi	Commissioner General of the National Police Agency; 2018–2020	Succeeded by Mitsuhiro Matsumoto
Preceded by Kazuhiro Sugita	Deputy Chief Cabinet Secretary (Administrative affairs); 2021–2024	Succeeded by Fumitoshi Satō
