= Hokkaido 5th district (1947–1993) =

Former Japan House of Representatives constituency

The Old 5th District in Hokkaido, Japan, is a now abolished district lasting from 1947 through 1993. Its population as of 1993 was 822,797. It was the largest constituency up until its abolition, roughly 1.5 times the size of Shikoku Island.

== Notable representatives ==
- Ichiro Nakagawa, Liberal Democratic Party、1963・1967・1969・1972・1976・1979・1980
- Shoichi Nakagawa, Liberal Democratic Party、1983・1986・1990・1993
- Muneo Suzuki, independent then Liberal Democratic Party, 1983・1986・1990・1993

== Election results ==
- 1993 Japanese general election
  - Shoichi Nakagawa, Liberal Democratic Party, 110,832 votes
  - Muneo Suzuki, Liberal Democratic Party, 85,201 votes
  - Japanese Communist Party, 26,136 votes
- 1990 Japanese general election
  - Shoichi Nakagawa, Liberal Democratic Party, 110,781 votes
  - Muneo Suzuki, Liberal Democratic Party, 89,654 votes
  - Japanese Communist Party, 26,335 votes
- 1986 Japanese general election
  - Shoichi Nakagawa, Liberal Democratic Party, 118,149 votes
  - Muneo Suzuki, Liberal Democratic Party, 93,835 votes
  - Japanese Communist Party, 20,914 votes
- 1983 Japanese general election
  - Shoichi Nakagawa, Liberal Democratic Party, 163,755 votes
  - Muneo Suzuki, independent, 67,436 votes
  - Japanese Communist Party, 20,478 votes
- 1980 Japanese general election
  - Ichiro Nakagawa, Liberal Democratic Party
- 1979 Japanese general election
  - Ichiro Nakagawa, Liberal Democratic Party
- 1976 Japanese general election
  - Ichiro Nakagawa, Liberal Democratic Party
- 1972 Japanese general election
  - Ichiro Nakagawa, Liberal Democratic Party
- 1969 Japanese general election
  - Ichiro Nakagawa, Liberal Democratic Party
- 1967 Japanese general election
  - Ichiro Nakagawa, Liberal Democratic Party
- 1963 Japanese general election
  - Ichiro Nakagawa, Liberal Democratic Party
