= Yoshiro Yokomine =

Japanese politician

- 横峯 良郎
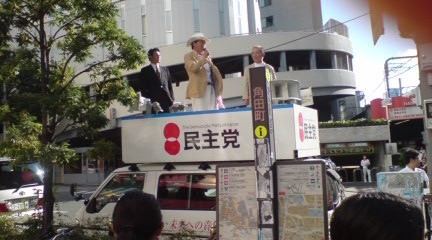

Member of the House of Councillors
- In office 29 July 2007 – 28 July 2013
- Constituency: National PR

Personal details
- Born: 15 March 1960 (age 66) Kanoya, Kagoshima, Japan
- Party: New Party Daichi
- Other political affiliations: DPJ (2007–2012); NHK (2019)
- Children: Sakura Yokomine

Yoshiro Yokomine (横峯 良郎, Yokomine Yoshirō; born March 15, 1960) is a Japanese politician of the Democratic Party of Japan, a member of the House of Councillors in the Diet (national legislature). A native of Kagoshima Prefecture and high school graduate, he was elected for the first time in 2007. He is the father of professional golfer Sakura Yokomine.
