= Deputy Chief Cabinet Secretary =

Role in the Japanese Government

The Deputy Chief Cabinet Secretary (内閣官房副長官, Naikaku-kanbō-fuku-chōkan) is an official in the Japanese government who assists the Chief Cabinet Secretary. Since July 1998 there have always been three Deputy Chief Cabinet Secretaries at any given time.

== Role ==
The Deputy Chief Cabinet Secretaries are customarily divided into two types: those responsible for political affairs (政務担当) and those responsible for administrative affairs (事務担当). Since the Obuchi Cabinet, there have been two Deputy Chief Cabinet Secretaries for political affairs and one for administrative affairs. Prior to that, there were one for each.

The Deputy Chief Cabinet Secretaries for political affairs are members of the National Diet, one from the House of Representatives and one from the House of Councillors. The position is often given to a protégé or close aide to the prime minister. It is considered a gateway to success for mid-career Diet members, as those who serve in it have often been given important cabinet positions afterwards. There are five instances of former Deputy Chief Cabinet Secretaries becoming Prime Minister: Noboru Takeshita, Toshiki Kaifu, Yoshirō Mori, Shinzo Abe and Yukio Hatoyama.

The Deputy Chief Cabinet Secretary for administrative affairs is the senior bureaucrat in the government. The position is typically filled by someone who has previously served as administrative vice-minister or in an equivalent role. The main function of this position is to coordinate the bureaucracy. They preside over the administrative vice-minister's liaison conference, a sub-cabinet meeting of the senior bureaucrats of each ministry.

== List of officeholders ==
=== Since the Obuchi Cabinet ===
Date of appointment	Political affairs (House of Representatives)	Political affairs (House of Councillors)	Administrative affairs	Prime Minister
31 July 1998	Muneo Suzuki	Mitsuhiro Uesugi	Teijirō Furukawa	Obuchi
5 October 1999	Fukushiro Nukaga	Sōichirō Matsutani	Teijirō Furukawa	Obuchi
5 April 2000	Fukushiro Nukaga	Sōichirō Matsutani	Teijirō Furukawa	Mori
4 July 2000	Shinzo Abe	Kōsei Ueno	Teijirō Furukawa	Mori
26 April 2001	Shinzo Abe	Kōsei Ueno	Teijirō Furukawa	Koizumi
22 September 2003	Hiroyuki Hosoda	Masaaki Yamazaki	Masahiro Futahashi	Koizumi
7 May 2004	Seiken Sugiura	Masaaki Yamazaki	Masahiro Futahashi	Koizumi
31 October 2005	Jinen Nagase	Seiji Suzuki	Masahiro Futahashi	Koizumi
26 September 2006	Hakubun Shimomura	Seiji Suzuki	Junzō Matoba	Abe
27 August 2007	Matsushige Ono	Mitsuhide Iwaki	Junzō Matoba	Abe
26 September 2007	Matsushige Ono	Mitsuhide Iwaki	Masahiro Futahashi	Fukuda
1 August 2008	Ryu Shionoya	Mitsuhide Iwaki	Masahiro Futahashi	Fukuda
24 September 2008	Jun Matsumoto	Yoshitada Konoike	Iwao Uruma	Aso
13 May 2009	Jun Matsumoto	Katsuhito Asano	Iwao Uruma	Aso
16 September 2009	Yorihisa Matsuno	Koji Matsui	Kin'ya Takino	Hatoyama
8 June 2010	Motohisa Furukawa	Tetsuro Fukuyama	Kin'ya Takino	Kan
14 January 2011	Hirohisa Fujii	Tetsuro Fukuyama	Kin'ya Takino	Kan
17 March 2011	Yoshito Sengoku	Tetsuro Fukuyama	Kin'ya Takino	Kan
2 September 2011	Tsuyoshi Saitō	Hiroyuki Nagahama	Makoto Taketoshi	Noda
1 October 2012	Tsuyoshi Saitō	Hirokazu Shiba	Makoto Taketoshi	Noda
26 December 2012	Katsunobu Kato	Hiroshige Seko	Kazuhiro Sugita	Abe
7 October 2015	Koichi Hagiuda	Hiroshige Seko	Kazuhiro Sugita	Abe
13 August 2016	Koichi Hagiuda	Kotaro Nogami	Kazuhiro Sugita	Abe
3 August 2017	Yasutoshi Nishimura	Kotaro Nogami	Kazuhiro Sugita	Abe
11 September 2019	Akihiro Nishimura	Naoki Okada	Kazuhiro Sugita	Abe
16 September 2020	Manabu Sakai	Naoki Okada	Kazuhiro Sugita	Suga
4 October 2021	Seiji Kihara	Yoshihiko Isozaki	Shun'ichi Kuryu	Kishida
13 September 2023	Hideki Murai	Hiroshi Moriya	Shun'ichi Kuryu	Kishida
1 October 2024	Keiichiro Tachibana	Kazuhiko Aoki	Fumitoshi Satō	Ishiba
21 October 2025	Masanao Ozaki	Kei Satō	Yasuhiro Tsuyuki	Takaichi
17 September 2026	Masanao Ozaki	Yūsuke Nakanishi	Yasuhiro Tsuyuki	Takaichi
