= Iwao Uruma =

Japanese official

- 漆間 巌
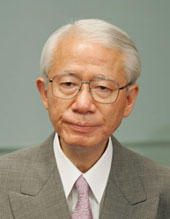
- Uruma in 2008

Deputy Chief Cabinet Secretary (Administrative affairs)
- In office 24 September 2008 – 16 September 2009
- Prime Minister: Tarō Asō
- Preceded by: Masahiro Futahashi
- Succeeded by: Kin'ya Takino

Personal details
- Born: 19 April 1945 (age 81) Tokyo, Japan
- Education: University of Tokyo

Iwao Uruma (漆間 巌, Uruma Iwao; born 19 April 1945) is a Japanese police officer who served as Deputy Chief Cabinet Secretary for Administrative Affairs from 2008 to 2009, under Prime Minister Tarō Asō. He previously served as Commissioner General of the National Police Agency from 2004 to 2007.

== Biography ==
=== Early life and education ===
Iwao Uruma was born in Tokyo on 19 April 1945. His father was a police officer in the Tokyo Metropolitan Police Department and his older brother also became a police officer. After attending Hibiya High School, Uruma studied law at the University of Tokyo. He joined the National Police Agency after graduating in 1969.

=== Police career ===
After working mainly with criminal investigation, Uruma was seconded to the Japanese embassy in Moscow as first secretary from 1980 to 1983. After that he often held posts related to intelligence and security. He was seconded to the Defense Agency as chief of the Annex Research Office in the Second Investigation Bureau of the JGSDF Staff from 1987 to 1989. Uruma served as chief of the Nara Prefectural police from 1989 to 1991, of the Aichi Prefectural police from 1996 to 1999, Deputy Superintendent General of the Tokyo Metropolitan Police Department from 1999 to 2000 and chief of the Osaka Prefectural police from 2000 to 2001.

Uruma was named chief of the Security Bureau of the National Police Agency in May 2001. He was promoted to Deputy Commissioner General in August 2002 and was named Commissioner General in August 2004. He was noted for spearheading investigation into North Korean abductions of Japanese citizens, leading to the identification of previously unknown abductees. Uruma retired from the National Police Agency in August 2007.

=== Cabinet Secretariat and retirement ===
When Tarō Asō became prime minister in September 2008, Uruma was appointed Deputy Chief Cabinet Secretary for administrative affairs. He was the first in that office to come from the police force since Hiromori Kawashima during the Miki Cabinet.

In March 2009, Uruma faced controversy over off-the-record remarks to the press regarding the Nishimatsu scandal, in which Democratic Party leader Ichiro Ozawa was suspected of receiving illegal donations from a construction firm. He was reported to have said the police investigation was unlikely to affect the Liberal Democratic Party, fueling speculation of political bias. Uruma later clarified that he did not intend to suggest any partiality and claimed his comments had been misconstrued.

Uruma left his position at the end of the Aso Cabinet in September 2009.
