= Yoshinobu Shimamura =

Japanese politician

- 島村 宜伸
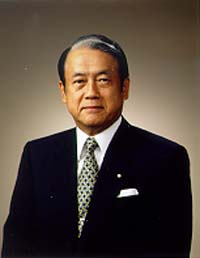
- Official portrait, 1997

Minister of Agriculture, Forestry and Fisheries
- In office 27 September 2004 – 8 August 2005
- Prime Minister: Junichiro Koizumi
- Preceded by: Yoshiyuki Kamei
- Succeeded by: Junichiro Koizumi (acting); Mineichi Iwanaga
- In office 26 September 1997 – 30 July 1998
- Prime Minister: Ryutaro Hashimoto
- Preceded by: Ihei Ochi
- Succeeded by: Shoichi Nakagawa

Minister of Education
- In office 8 August 1995 – 11 January 1996
- Prime Minister: Tomiichi Murayama
- Preceded by: Kaoru Yosano
- Succeeded by: Mikio Okuda

Member of the House of Representatives
- In office 10 November 2003 – 21 July 2009
- Preceded by: Yoshio Udagawa
- Succeeded by: Akihiro Hatsushika
- Constituency: Tokyo 16th
- In office 23 June 1980 – 2 June 2000
- Preceded by: Rikyū Shibusawa
- Succeeded by: Yoshio Udagawa
- Constituency: Tokyo 10th (1980–1996); Tokyo 16th (1996–2000)
- In office 10 December 1976 – 7 September 1979
- Preceded by: Ichirō Shimamura
- Succeeded by: Mamoru Tajima
- Constituency: Tokyo 10th

Personal details
- Born: 27 March 1934 (age 92) Edogawa, Tokyo, Japan
- Party: Liberal Democratic
- Children: 2
- Parent: Ichirō Shimamura (father)
- Education: Gakushuin University

Yoshinobu Shimamura (島村 宜伸, Shimamura Yoshinobu; born 27 March 1934) is a Japanese politician.

== Biography ==
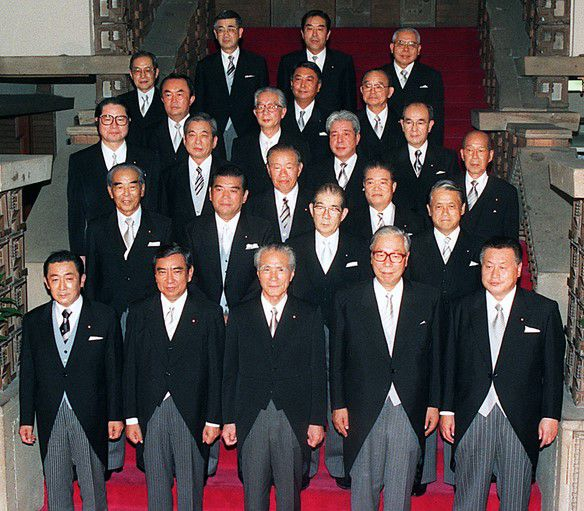
Shimamura with members of the Murayama Reshuffled Cabinet (at the Prime Minister's Official Residence on 8 August 1995)

Born in Edogawa, Tokyo, he graduated from the Faculty of Politics & Economics at Gakushuin University in 1956 and then entered ENEOS, a Japanese oil company. He also worked as an aide to Yasuhiro Nakasone until running successfully for the House of Representatives in 1976 as a member of the Liberal Democratic Party.

He served as the Minister of Education for Prime Minister Tomiichi Murayama in 1995. He was appointed the Minister of Agriculture, Forestry and Fisheries in 1997 and served in that position until 2000 when he was defeated in his reelection campaign. He ran again in 2003 and was elected, and was once again appointed the Minister of Agriculture, Forestry and Fisheries in 2004 by Prime Minister Junichiro Koizumi.

He opposed the Prime Minister's motion to dissolve the House of Representatives following the defeat of the government's postal privatization bill and was forced to resign in August 2005, prior to the 2005 Japanese general election.

Political offices
Preceded by Yoshiyuki Kamei; Ihei Ochi	Minister of Agriculture, Forestry and Fisheries of Japan; 1997–1998; 2004–2005	Succeeded by Junichiro Koizumi; Shōichi Nakagawa
Preceded by Kaoru Yosano	Minister of Education; 1995–1996	Succeeded by Takashi Kosugi
