= Masahiro Futahashi =

Japanese official (1941–2026)

- 二橋 正弘
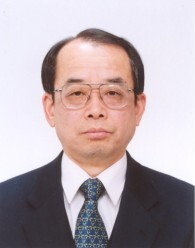
- Official portrait, 2003

Deputy Chief Cabinet Secretary (Administrative affairs)
- In office September 26, 2007 – September 24, 2008
- Prime Minister: Yasuo Fukuda
- Preceded by: Junzō Matoba
- Succeeded by: Iwao Uruma
- In office September 22, 2003 – September 26, 2006
- Prime Minister: Junichiro Koizumi
- Preceded by: Teijirō Furukawa
- Succeeded by: Junzō Matoba

Personal details
- Born: December 27, 1941 Toyama Prefecture, Japan
- Died: June 8, 2026 (aged 84)
- Education: University of Tokyo

Masahiro Futahashi (二橋 正弘, Futahashi Masahiro; December 27, 1941 – June 8, 2026) was a Japanese official who served twice as Deputy Chief Cabinet Secretary from 2003 to 2006 and 2007 to 2008. He served under the cabinets of Junichiro Koizumi and Yasuo Fukuda.

Before that, Futuhashi was a bureaucrat in the Ministry of Home Affairs, serving as administrative vice minister from 1999 to 2001.

== Life and career ==
Masahiro Futahashi was born in Toyama Prefecture on December 27, 1941. He studied law at the University of Tokyo. After graduation, he joined the Ministry of Home Affairs in 1964.

After rising to become a senior official, Futahashi successively served as vice governor of Shizuoka Prefecture, president of the Local Autonomy College, chief secretary of the Minister's Secretariat and chief of the Local Finance Bureau. He became administrative vice minister for Home Affairs in August 1999. He was the last vice minister of the ministry, retiring when it was replaced by the Ministry of Internal Affairs and Communications due to the central government reform in January 2001.

In September 2003, Futahashi was appointed Deputy Chief Cabinet Secretary for administrative affairs under the Koizumi Cabinet. He had a good relationship Chief Cabinet Secretary Yasuo Fukuda, but not with Shinzo Abe, who was appointed Chief Cabinet Secretary in 2005. Futahashi left his position when Koizumi resigned in September 2006.

Futahashi was unusually reappointed when Yasuo Fukuda became prime minister in September 2007, before again retiring due to the end of the Fukuda Cabinet in September 2008.

Futahashi died on June 8, 2026, at the age of 84.
