= Kazuhiro Sugita =

Japanese official (1941–2025)

- 杉田 和博
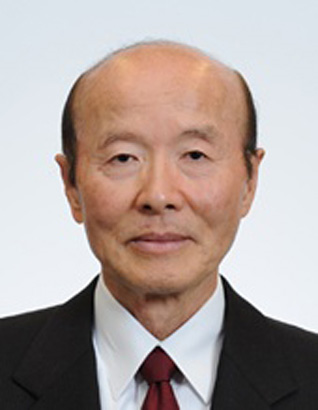
- Official portrait, 2012

Deputy Chief Cabinet Secretary (Administrative affairs)
- In office 26 December 2012 – 4 October 2021
- Prime Minister: Shinzo Abe; Yoshihide Suga
- Preceded by: Makoto Taketoshi
- Succeeded by: Shun'ichi Kuryu

Personal details
- Born: 11 April 1941 Saitama Prefecture, Japan
- Died: 22 December 2025 (aged 84)
- Education: University of Tokyo

Kazuhiro Sugita (杉田 和博, Sugita Kazuhiro; 11 April 1941 – 22 December 2025) was a Japanese government official who served as Deputy Chief Cabinet Secretary from 2012 to 2021. As such, Sugita was the senior bureaucrat in Japan from the inauguration of the Second Abe Cabinet to the end of the Suga Cabinet. He was previously a police officer.

== Life and career ==
Kazuhiro Sugita was born in Saitama Prefecture on 11 April 1941. He attended the University of Tokyo and joined the National Police Agency after graduating in 1966. As a police officer he often held positions in the fields of internal security and intelligence gathering. He also served as secretary to the Chief Cabinet Secretary Masaharu Gotōda and his successor Takao Fujinami from 1982 to 1985, chief of the Tottori Prefectural police from 1986 to 1988, and as a division chief in the Security Bureau of the National Police Agency from 1988 to 1991.

After having served as chief of the Kanagawa Prefectural police since 1993, Sugita was appointed chief of the Security Bureau in October 1994. During his tenure he was involved in the response to the Great Hanshin earthquake, the Tokyo subway sarin attack, the attempted assassination of Commissioner General Takaji Kunimatsu and the Japanese embassy hostage crisis in Peru.

In April 1997 he was appointed Director of the Cabinet Intelligence and Research Office. The office was strengthened along with the administrative reforms of the time. Sugita received the title of Director of Cabinet Intelligence with vice-ministerial rank in 2001. In April of the same year he was moved to become Deputy Chief Cabinet Secretary for Crisis Management. Sugita worked alongside Shinzo Abe who was Deputy Chief Cabinet Secretary for political affairs from 2000 to 2003. Sugita retired in January 2004. After retirement, he became an adviser to the Central Japan Railway Company.

When Shinzo Abe became prime minister for his second time in December 2012, Sugita was appointed to serve as Deputy Chief Cabinet Secretary for administrative affairs, the senior position held by a bureaucrat in the government. This appointment was reportedly on the recommendation of Yoshiyuki Kasai, president of the Central Japan Railway Company, who was a prominent supporter of Abe and a friend of Sugita.

Sugita would serve in his post for almost nine years, longer than any of his predecessors. His immediate superior during the Abe administration was Chief Cabinet Secretary Yoshihide Suga. From August 2017 he concurrently served as Director of the Cabinet Bureau of Personnel Affairs. He remained in office when Yoshihide Suga succeeded Abe. Sugita retired with the end of the Suga cabinet in October 2021.

After that, Sugita returned to being an adviser to the Central Japan Railway Company. He received the Grand Cordon of the Order of the Rising Sun in April 2022.

Sugita died on 22 December 2025 at the age of 84.

== Honours ==
- Japan:Grand Cordon of the Order of the Rising Sun
- Netherlands: Grand Officer of the Order of Orange-Nassau (29 October 2014)
