= Mineichi Iwanaga =

Japanese politician

- 岩永 峯一
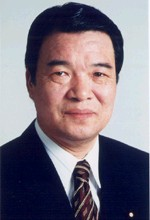
- Official portrait, 2005

Minister of Agriculture, Forestry and Fisheries
- In office 11 August 2005 – 31 October 2005
- Prime Minister: Junichiro Koizumi
- Preceded by: Yoshinobu Shimamura; Junichiro Koizumi (acting)
- Succeeded by: Shōichi Nakagawa

Member of the House of Representatives
- In office 21 October 1996 – 21 July 2009
- Preceded by: Constituency established
- Succeeded by: Tenzo Okumura
- Constituency: Shiga 3rd (1996–2003); Shiga 4th (2003–2009)

Speaker of the Shiga Prefectural Assembly
- In office 1990–1991

Member of the Shiga Prefectural Assembly
- In office 1975–1995

Personal details
- Born: 5 September 1941 (age 84) Kōka, Shiga, Japan
- Party: Liberal Democratic
- Education: Chuo University

Third Realigned Koizumi Cabinet (2005-10-31)
- Secretary: Shinzō Abe
- Internal Affairs: Heizō Takenaka
- Justice: Seiken Sugiura
- Foreign Affairs: Taro Aso
- Finance: Sadakazu Tanigaki
- Education: Kenji Kosaka
- Health: Jirō Kawasaki
- Agriculture: Shoichi Nakagawa
- Economy: Toshihiro Nikai
- Land: Kazuo Kitagawa
- Environment: Yuriko Koike
- Defense: Fukushiro Nukaga
- Ministers of State: Tetsuo Kutsukake; Kaoru Yosano; Koki Chuma; Iwao Matsuda; Kuniko Inoguchi

Mineichi Iwanaga (岩永峯一 Iwanaga Mineichi, born 5 September 1941) is a former Japanese politician.

Born in Koka, Shiga Prefecture, Iwanaga attended Koka Senior High School and graduated from the law faculty of Chuo University.

After serving as a town council member in Shiga, Iwanaga was elected to the House of Representatives in 1996, representing the fourth district of Shiga. He joined the Kato faction of the Liberal Democratic Party, but later switched to the Horiuchi faction. He became Vice Minister of Agriculture under the first Koizumi cabinet.

On August 11, 2005, Iwanaga became Minister of Agriculture following the resignation of Yoshinobu Shimamura.
