= Ichiro Nakagawa =

Japanese politician (1925–1983)

- 中川 一郎
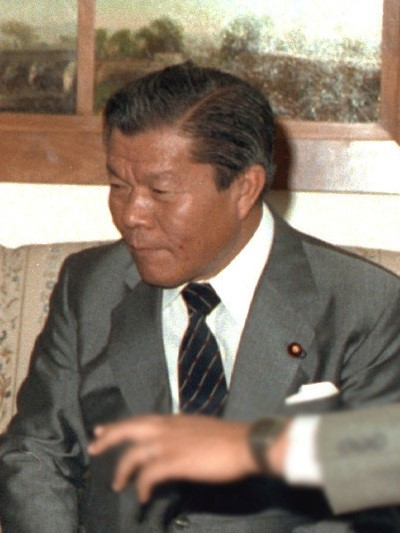
- Nakagawa in 1982

Director-General of the Science and Technology Agency
- In office 7 July 1980 – 27 November 1982
- Prime Minister: Zenkō Suzuki
- Preceded by: Yuji Osada
- Succeeded by: Takaaki Yasuda

Minister of Agriculture, Forestry and Fisheries
- In office 5 July 1978 – 7 December 1978
- Prime Minister: Takeo Fukuda
- Preceded by: Himself (as Minister of Agriculture and Forestry)
- Succeeded by: Michio Watanabe

Minister of Agriculture and Forestry
- In office 28 November 1977 – 5 July 1978
- Prime Minister: Takeo Fukuda
- Preceded by: Zenkō Suzuki
- Succeeded by: Himself (as Minister of Agriculture, Forestry and Fisheries)

Member of the House of Representatives
- In office 22 November 1963 – 9 January 1983
- Preceded by: Gōichi Itō
- Succeeded by: Shōichi Nakagawa
- Constituency: Hokkaido 5th

Personal details
- Born: 9 March 1925 Hiroo, Hokkaido, Japan
- Died: 9 January 1983 (aged 57) Sapporo, Hokkaido, Japan
- Party: Liberal Democratic
- Spouse: Sadako Nakagawa
- Children: Shōichi Nakagawa
- Relatives: Yoshio Nakagawa (brother); Koichi Nakagawa (grandson)
- Education: Kyushu Imperial University

Ichiro Nakagawa (中川 一郎, Nakagawa Ichirō; 9 March 1925 – 9 January 1983) was a Japanese politician from Hokkaidō. He was a significant leader of the right wing of the Liberal Democratic Party.

== Early life and career ==
Ichiro Nakagawa was born on 9 March 1925 in a poor village in Hokkaido, where his family had settled. Nakagawa did well in school and went on to study agriculture at Kyushu University, after which he began working for the Hokkaido Development Agency.

Nakagawa's turn towards politics came due to his encounter with Banboku Ōno, an influential politician who was appointed director general of the Hokkaido Development Agency in 1954. By his own account Nakagawa was called to Ono's office after having slept through his inaugural speech, but Ono was amused rather than annoyed and decided to make Nakagawa his secretary. After Ono left his position, Nakagawa left the agency to become Ono's secretary.

== Diet member ==
With Ono's support, Nakagawa ran as a LDP candidate for Hokkaido 5th district in the 1963 House of Representatives election and was elected. Nakagawa joined the Ono faction, but after Ono died in 1964 the faction split between Ono's lieutenants, Naka Funada and Isamu Murakami, and Nakagawa joined the Funada faction. He also developed a close relationship to Takeo Fukuda, whom he twice served under as parliamentary vice minister when Fukuda was minister of finance.

In 1973, Nakagawa, along with Shintaro Ishihara, Michio Watanabe, Koichi Hamada and others, formed a cross-factional rightist group of junior LDP Diet members, called the Seirankai, or Blue Storm Society. Nakagawa was the leader of the Seirankai, which received notoriety for its members signing a pledge in blood.

After Takeo Fukuda was elected LDP president and prime minister in December 1976 Nakagawa was made chief of the LDP National Movement Headquarters, and when Fukuda reshuffled his cabinet in November 1977 Nakagawa entered as Minister of Agriculture.

Nakagawa served as director general of the Science and Technology Agency under Zenko Suzuki. He ran in the November 1982 LDP presidential election to succeed Suzuki, but lost in fourth place.

In 1982, a magazine released a picture of Nakagawa relieving himself onto a tree in the garden of the Diet building's compound. This incident was widely criticized in the media and the opposition party sent a protest note against this action.

== Death and legacy ==
Nakagawa was found to have committed suicide by hanging at a hotel in Sapporo on 9 January 1983. The cause of death was initially reported as a heart attack and Nakagawa's friend and Diet colleague Masaaki Takagi admitted to having asked the physician to cover up the true cause at the urging of the family. Nakagawa did not leave a suicide note and rumours abounded regarding the motive.

== Personal life ==
Nakagawa's eldest son was Shōichi Nakagawa, a House of Representatives member. Nakagawa's younger brother is Yoshio Nakagawa.

Political offices
Preceded by Zenkō Suzuki	Minister of Agriculture and Forestry; 1977–1978	Succeeded by Himself as Minister of Agriculture, Forestry and Fisheries
Preceded by Himself as Minister of Agriculture and Forestry	Minister of Agriculture, Forestry and Fisheries; 1978	Succeeded by Michio Watanabe
Preceded by Yuji Osada	Director General of the Science and Technology Agency; 1980–1982	Succeeded by Takaaki Yasuda
Preceded by Yuji Osada	Chairman of the Atomic Energy Commission; 1980–1982	Succeeded by Takaaki Yasuda
House of Representatives (Japan)
Preceded by Yoshiaki Kibe	Chairman of the Transportation Committee; 1976	Succeeded by Akira Ono
