= Hiroshima 7th district =

Legislative district of Japan

Hiroshima 7th District (広島県第7区, Hiroshima-ken dai-nana-ku; or simply Hiroshima nana-ku (広島7区)) was a constituency of the House of Representatives in the Diet of Japan (national legislature). It was located in Hiroshima and consisted of the city of Fukuyama. As of 2012, 377,672 eligible voters were registered in the district. The district was eliminated in the 2022 reapportionments and became the Hiroshima 6th district.

Before the electoral reform of 1994, the area had been part of Hiroshima 3rd district where five representatives had been elected by single non-transferable vote.

The first representative for the single-member 7th district was former Prime Minister Kiichi Miyazawa for the Liberal Democratic Party. In 2000, he was followed by Yōichi Miyazawa (LDP), son of former Hiroshima governor Hiroshi Miyazawa, nephew of Kiichi Miyazawa, grandson of Representatives Yutaka Miyazawa and Masaki Kishida and great-grandson of Representative Heikichi Ogawa. In the landslide election of 2009 when the LDP-Kōmeitō coalition lost its majority, Takashi Wada, husband of former Finance minister Tatsuo Murayama's granddaughter, won the district against Miyazawa for the Democratic Party. In the landslide election of 2012 when the DPJ-PNP coalition lost more than two-thirds of its seats, Liberal Democrat Fumiaki Kobayashi won the district.

== List of representatives ==
Party	Representative	Dates	Notes
LDP	Kiichi Miyazawa	1996–2000	
LDP	Yōichi Miyazawa	2000–2009	Failed reelection in the Chūgoku PR block
DPJ	Takashi Wada	2009–2012	Failed reelection in the Chūgoku PR block
LDP	Fumiaki Kobayashi	2012–2024	Constituency abolished

== Election results ==
2021
Party	Candidate	Votes	%	±%
LDP	Fumiaki Kobayashi (endorsed by Komeito)	123,396	66.45	
CDP	Hironori Sato	45,520	24.51	
JCP	Akemi Murai	11,580	6.24	
Independent	Kayo Hashimoto	5207	2.80	

2012
Party	Candidate	Votes	%	±%
LDP	Fumiaki Kobayashi (endorsed by Komeito)	93,491	47.5	
Democratic	Takashi Wada (endorsed by the PNP)	52,543	26.7	
Restoration	Daisuke Sakamoto (won PR seat)(endorsed by Your Party)	38,919	19.8	
JCP	Takushi Kanbara	11,777	6.0	

2009
Party	Candidate	Votes	%	±%
Democratic	Takashi Wada (endorsed by the PNP)	133,871		
LDP	Yōichi Miyazawa (endorsed by Komeito)	111,321		
Happiness Realization	Mitsuo Uematsu	3,879		
Turnout		254,275	67.86	

2005
Party	Candidate	Votes	%	±%
LDP	Yōichi Miyazawa	122,465		
Democratic	Takashi Wada	104,009		
JCP	Mikie Morikawa	14,444		
Turnout		245,522	66.28	

2003
Party	Candidate	Votes	%	±%
LDP	Yōichi Miyazawa	90,487		
Democratic	Takashi Wada (elected by PR)	73,252		
Independent	Toshimasa Yamada	23,185		
JCP	Mikie Morikawa	11,100		
Turnout		203,782	55.46	

2000
Party	Candidate	Votes	%	±%
LDP	Yōichi Miyazawa	112,145		
Democratic	Toshimasa Yamada (elected by PR)	68,500		
JCP	Mikie Morikawa	20,765		

1996
Party	Candidate	Votes	%	±%
LDP	Kiichi Miyazawa	95,045		
Democratic	Minoru Yanagida	69,603		
New Socialist Party (Japan)	Shinsaku Takahashi	21,240		
JCP	Matsutarō Shimizu	14,915		
Turnout		204,490	58.64	
