= Yoichi Miyazawa =

Japanese politician

- 宮沢 洋一
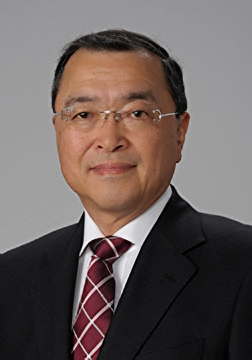
- Official portrait, 2014

Minister of Economy, Trade and Industry
- In office 21 October 2014 – 7 October 2015
- Prime Minister: Shinzo Abe
- Preceded by: Yūko Obuchi
- Succeeded by: Motoo Hayashi

Member of the House of Councillors
- Incumbent
- Assumed office 26 July 2010
- Preceded by: Ikuo Kamei
- Constituency: Hiroshima at-large

Member of the House of Representatives
- In office 26 June 2000 – 21 July 2009
- Preceded by: Kiichi Miyazawa
- Succeeded by: Takashi Wada
- Constituency: Hiroshima 7th

Personal details
- Born: 21 April 1950 (age 76) Tokyo, Japan
- Party: Liberal Democratic
- Parent: Hiroshi Miyazawa (father)
- Relatives: Kiichi Miyazawa (uncle); Fumio Kishida (cousin)
- Education: University of Tokyo; Harvard University

Yoichi Miyazawa (宮沢 洋一, Miyazawa Yōichi; born 21 April 1950) is a Japanese politician who serves as Chairman of the Tax Research Commission in the Liberal Democratic Party since 2021 and from 2015 to 2019. He also served as Minister of Economy, Trade and Industry from 2014 to 2015. He has served as a member of the House of Councillors since 2010 and was previously a House of Representatives from 2000 to 2009.

Miyazawa is a nephew of Kiichi Miyazawa and a cousin of Fumio Kishida. He was an official in the Ministry of Finance before entering politics.

== Early life ==
Yoichi Miyazawa was born on 21 April 1950, in Tokyo, to a prominent family from Hiroshima Prefecture. He was the eldest son of Hiroshi Miyazawa and Reiko Miyazawa (née Kishida). His paternal uncle was Kiichi Miyazawa. Through his mother he's an elder cousin of Fumio Kishida. Hiroshi Miyazawa was then an official in the Local Administration Agency. He would later become Governor of Hiroshima Prefecture, a member of the House of Councillors and Minister of Justice.

Yoichi Miyazawa studied law at the University of Tokyo and joined the Ministry of Finance after graduating in 1974. While in the Ministry he was sent to continue his studies at Harvard University in the United States, receiving a Master of Public Administration degree in 1978. Miyazawa held various posts in the Ministry before being appointed secretary to the Prime Minister, his uncle Kiichi Miyazawa, in July 1992. Kiichi Miyazawa resigned as prime minister in August 1993, and Yoichi Miyazawa retired from the Ministry the following month to continue serving as his uncle's secretary.

== Political career ==
For the 2000 general election, Kiichi Miyazawa was transferring from Hiroshima 7th district to the Chūgoku proportional representation block. Yoichi Miyazawa ran as the LDP candidate to replace his uncle in Hiroshima 7th district and was elected to the House of Representatives. Once elected Miyazawa joined the Kōchikai, the faction formerly led by his uncle.

Miyazawa was appointed senior vice minister for the Cabinet Office under in August 2008 and remained until September 2009, when the LDP lost power after the 2009 general election. Yoichi Miyazawa lost his seat in the same election, but in July of the following year he stood as the LDP candidate for the Hiroshima at-large district in the 2010 House of Councillors election and was elected.

In October 2014 Miyazawa was appointed Minister of Economy, Trade and Industry under Prime Minister Shinzo Abe, after Yuko Obuchi resigned from the position due to a funds scandal. After leaving cabinet in the reshuffle in October the following year he became chairman of the LDP Tax Commission. He was demoted to subcommittee chairman when Akira Amari was appointed chairman in September 2019, but returned as chairman when Amari was appointed Secretary General of the LDP in October 2021.

Miyazawa was also selected as chairman of the party disciplinary committee in November 2024.

In August 2025, Miyazawa was elected chairman of the Committee on Financial Affairs in the House of Councillors.

House of Councillors
Preceded by Minoru Yanagida; Ikuo Kamei	Councillor for Hiroshima (class of 1950/1956/...); 2010–present Served alongside: Minoru Yanagida	Incumbent
Preceded by Shingo Miyake	Chairman of the Committee on Financial Affairs; 2025	Succeeded by Shuji Miyamoto
Preceded by Haruko Arimura	Chairman of the Board of Oversight and Review of Specially Designated Secrets; 2025–present	Incumbent
House of Representatives (Japan)
Preceded by Kiichi Miyazawa	Representative for Hiroshima 7th district 2000–2009	Succeeded by Takashi Wada
Political offices
Preceded by Yūko Obuchi	Minister of Economy, Trade and Industry; 2014–2015	Succeeded by Motoo Hayashi
Party political offices
Preceded by Takeshi Noda	Chairman of the Tax Research Commission, Liberal Democratic Party; 2015–2019	Succeeded by Akira Amari
Preceded by Fukushiro Nukaga	Subcommittee Chairman of the Tax Research Commission, Liberal Democratic Party; 2019–2021	Succeeded by Katsunobu Kato
Preceded by Akira Amari	Chairman of the Tax Research Commission, Liberal Democratic Party; 2021–2025	Succeeded by Itsunori Onodera
