= Hiroyuki Konishi =

Hiroyuki Konishi may refer to:

- Hiroyuki Konishi (politician, born 1936) (小西博行), 20th century Japanese politician
- Hiroyuki Konishi (politician, born 1972), (小西洋之), 21st century Japanese politician
- Hiroyuki Konishi (gymnast) (小西裕之), Japanese gymnast
