= Shinya Izumi =

Japanese politician (born 1937)

- 泉 信也
- Official portrait, 2003

Chairman of the National Public Safety Commission
- In office 27 August 2007 – 2 August 2008
- Prime Minister: Shinzo Abe; Yasuo Fukuda
- Preceded by: Kensei Mizote
- Succeeded by: Motoo Hayashi

Member of the House of Councillors
- In office 27 July 1992 – 25 July 2010
- Constituency: National PR

Personal details
- Born: 1 August 1937 (age 89) Yoshii, Fukuoka, Japan
- Party: Liberal Democratic (1992–1993; 2003–2010)
- Other political affiliations: JRP (1993–1994); NFP (1994–1998); LP (1998–2000); NCP (2000–2003)
- Education: Kyushu University

Shinya Izumi (泉 信也, Izumi Shin'ya; born 1 August 1937) is a retired Japanese politician of the Liberal Democratic Party, who served as the Chairman of the National Public Safety Commission in Shinzo Abe's cabinet from August 2007 to August 2008. He also served as a member of the House of Councillors in the Diet of Japan (parliament).

Born in former town of Yoshii, Fukuoka, he graduated from Kyushu University with a degree in engineering. He was elected for the first time in 1992.

Senate
Preceded by None	Representative by proportional representation 1992 – present	Incumbent
Political offices
Preceded by Kensei Mizote	Minister of State, Chairman of the National Public Safety Commission of Japan; 2007 – present	Incumbent
Preceded by Sanae Takaichi; Food Safety	Minister of State for Disaster Management and Food Safety of Japan; 2007 – present	Incumbent
