= Fumiaki Kobayashi (politician) =

Japanese politician

- 小林 史明
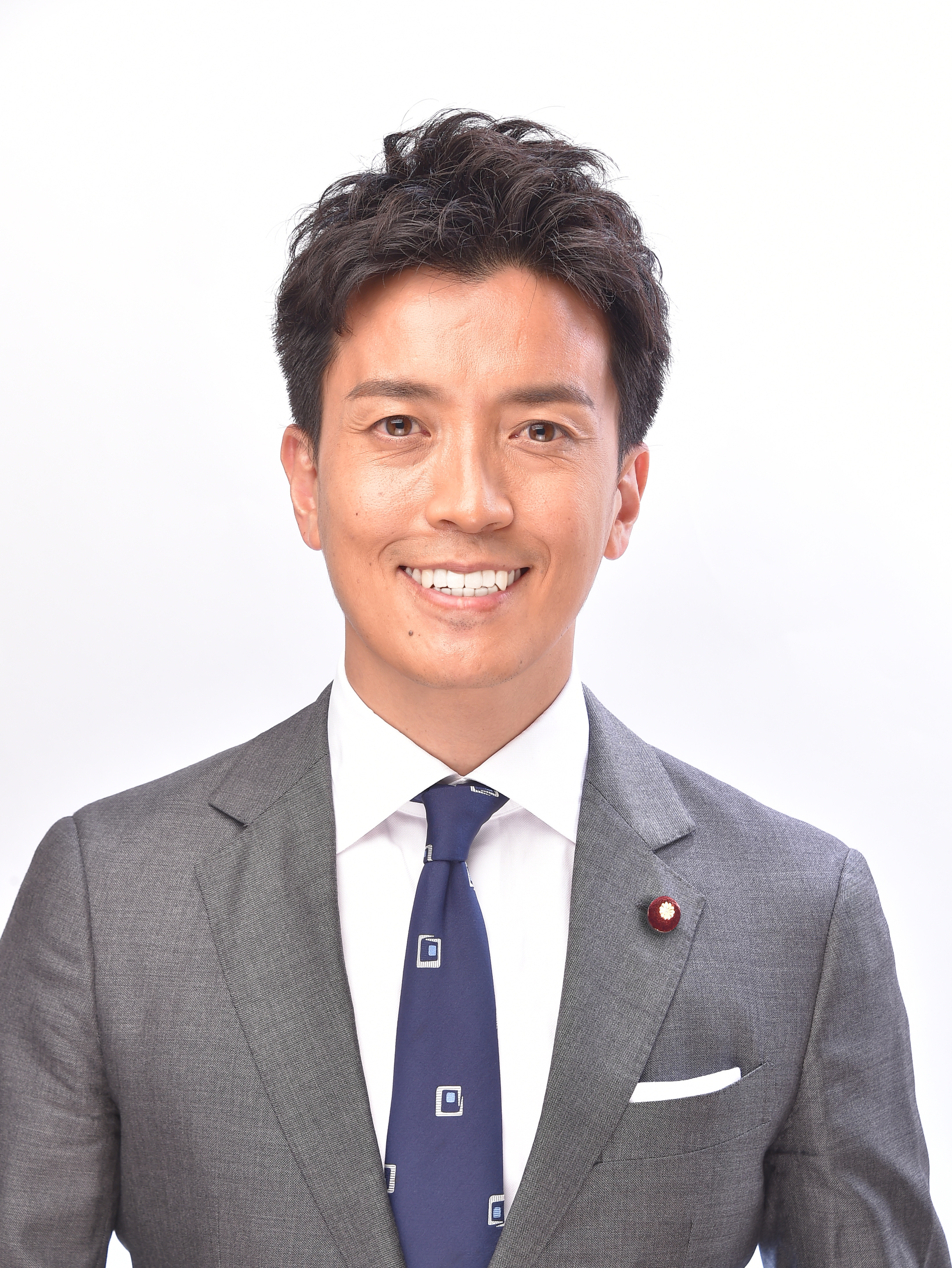
- Official portrait, 2021

Member of the House of Representatives
- Incumbent
- Assumed office 18 December 2012
- Preceded by: Takashi Wada
- Constituency: Hiroshima 7th (2012–2024); Hiroshima 6th (2024–present)

Personal details
- Born: 8 April 1983 (age 43) Takaoka, Toyama, Japan
- Party: Liberal Democratic
- Education: Sophia University

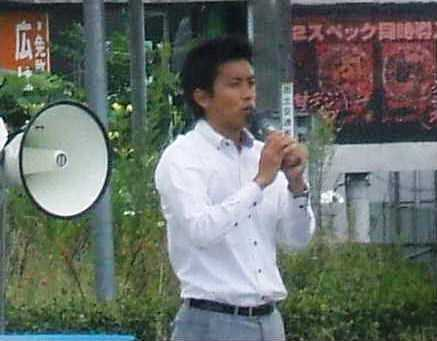
Kobayashi during a soapbox speech in Fukuyama in August 2012

Fumiaki Kobayashi (小林 史明, Kobayashi Fumiaki; born April 8, 1983 in Takaoka, Toyama) is a Japanese politician representing Hiroshima 7th district in the House of Representatives, the lower house of the National Diet, for the Liberal Democratic Party (LDP).

Kobayashi, a graduate of Eisū Gakkan High School in Fukuyama, Hiroshima and Sophia University in Chiyoda, Tokyo, entered into the service of telecommunications company NTT DoCoMo after his graduation in 2007. He worked for the company until 2012 when he entered national politics: He succeeded Yōichi Miyazawa as LDP candidate in Hiroshima 7th district (Fukuyama city) for the 2012 general election of the House of Representatives. Miyazawa, the nephew and successor of former LDP president Kiichi Miyazawa, had lost the district in 2009, but ran successfully for the House of Councillors in 2010. In 2012, Kobayashi defeated Democratic incumbent Takashi Wada by a solid margin and won his first term in the House of Representatives.

He is a descendant of the late Masao Kobayashi who headed the Fukuyama Chamber of Commerce and Industry for more than 20 years and was a one-term member of the House of Councillors for the Ryokufūkai ("early-summer breeze society"), elected in 1950 in the 50-member nationwide district.

House of Representatives (Japan)
Preceded by Takashi Wada	Member of the House of Representatives from Hiroshima 7th district 2012–present	Incumbent
