= Tetsuo Kutsukake =

Japanese politician (1929–2024)

- 沓掛 哲男
- Official portrait, 2006

Chairman of the National Public Safety Commission
- In office 31 October 2005 – 26 September 2006
- Prime Minister: Junichiro Koizumi
- Preceded by: Yoshitaka Murata
- Succeeded by: Kenzei Mizote

Member of the House of Representatives
- In office 30 August 2009 – 16 November 2012
- Constituency: Hokuriku-Shin'etsu PR

Member of the House of Councillors
- In office 25 June 2000 – 28 July 2007
- Preceded by: Hiroshi Hase
- Succeeded by: Yasuo Ichikawa
- Constituency: Ishikawa at-large
- In office 8 July 1986 – 25 July 1998
- Preceded by: Takaaki Yasuda
- Succeeded by: Sōta Iwamoto
- Constituency: Ishikawa at-large

Personal details
- Born: 12 September 1929 Kanazawa, Ishikawa, Japan
- Died: 30 January 2024 (aged 94) Tokyo, Japan
- Party: Democratic (2009–2012)
- Other political affiliations: LDP (1986–2007)
- Education: Tokyo University

Tetsuo Kutsukake (沓掛 哲男, Kutsukake Tetsuo; 12 September 1929 – 30 January 2024) was a Japanese politician. He was named Minister of State, Chairman of the National Public Safety Commission on 31 October 2005. Kutsukake died on 30 January 2024, at the age of 94.

Third Realigned Koizumi Cabinet (2005-10-31)
- Secretary: Shinzō Abe
- Internal Affairs: Heizō Takenaka
- Justice: Seiken Sugiura
- Foreign Affairs: Taro Aso
- Finance: Sadakazu Tanigaki
- Education: Kenji Kosaka
- Health: Jirō Kawasaki
- Agriculture: Shoichi Nakagawa
- Economy: Toshihiro Nikai
- Land: Kazuo Kitagawa
- Environment: Yuriko Koike
- Defense: Fukushiro Nukaga
- Ministers of State: Tetsuo Kutsukake; Kaoru Yosano; Koki Chuma; Iwao Matsuda; Kuniko Inoguchi

== Sources ==
http://www.senkyo.janjan.jp/bin/candidate/profile/profile.php?id=60171

Political offices
New office	Senior Vice-Minister of the Environment; 2001	Succeeded by Hisashi Kazama
Preceded by Yoshitaka Murata	Chairperson of the National Public Safety Commission; 2005–2006	Succeeded by Kensei Mizote
Preceded by Yoshitaka Murata	Minister of State for Disaster Management; 2005–2006	Succeeded by Kensei Mizote
House of Councillors
Preceded by Kimitaka Kuze	Chair, Commerce and Industry Committee of the House of Councillors of Japan; 1995–1996	Succeeded by Kazuhiko Kimiya
Honorary titles
Preceded by Taro Nakayama	Oldest member of the House of Representatives of Japan; 2009–2012	Succeeded by Shintaro Ishihara
