= Izuo Nagano =

Japanese politician

- 永野 嚴雄

Member of the House of Councillors
- In office 7 July 1974 – 8 October 1981
- Preceded by: Makoto Nakatsui
- Succeeded by: Hiroshi Miyazawa
- Constituency: Hiroshima at-large

Governor of Hiroshima Prefecture
- In office 29 May 1962 – 10 October 1973
- Monarch: Hirohito
- Preceded by: Hiroo Ōhara
- Succeeded by: Hiroshi Miyazawa

Personal details
- Born: 20 March 1918 Tokyo, Japan
- Died: 8 October 1981 (aged 63) Nirayama, Shizuoka, Japan
- Party: Liberal Democratic
- Education: Tokyo Imperial University

Izuo Nagano (永野 嚴雄, Nagano Izuo; March 20, 1918 – October 8, 1981) was the Governor of Hiroshima Prefecture from 1962 to 1973. In 1974 was elected as a member of the upper house of the Japanese parliament.

Preceded by Hiroo Ōhara	Governor of Hiroshima Prefecture; 1962-1973	Succeeded by Hiroshi Miyazawa
