= Gen Fukuda =

Japanese politician (born 1981)

- 福田 玄
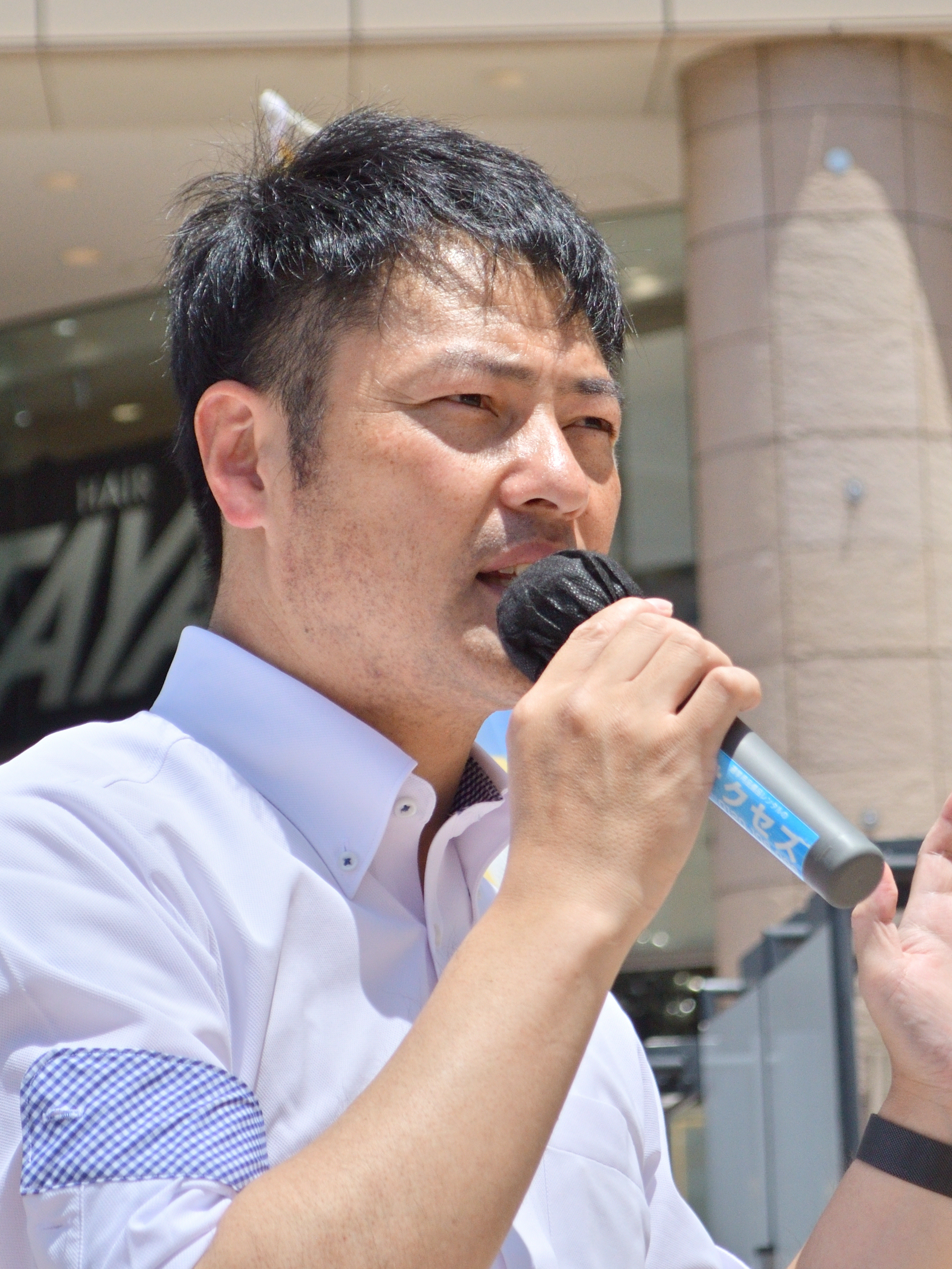
- Fukuda in 2025

Member of the House of Representatives
- In office 1 November 2024 – 23 January 2026
- Preceded by: Multi-member district
- Succeeded by: Seri Nabeshima
- Constituency: Chūgoku PR

Member of the Asakuchi City Council
- In office 2014–2018

Personal details
- Born: 6 December 1981 (age 44) Kamogata, Okayama, Japan
- Party: DPP (since 2024)
- Other political affiliations: DPJ (2014–2016); DP (2016–2018); Independent (2018–2024)
- Spouse: Haruko Miyaguchi
- Education: Takushoku University

Gen Fukuda (福田玄, Fukuda Gen; born 6 December 1981) is a Japanese politician who served as a member of the House of Representatives from 2024 to 2026. From 2014 to 2018, he was a city councillor of Asakuchi. He is married to Haruko Miyaguchi.
