= Ritsuko Nagao =

Japanese politician (1933–2026)

- 長尾 立子

Minister of Justice
- In office 11 January 1996 – 7 November 1996
- Prime Minister: Ryutaro Hashimoto
- Preceded by: Hiroshi Miyazawa
- Succeeded by: Isao Matsuura

Member of the House of Councillors
- In office 19 May 1997 – 25 July 1998
- Preceded by: Hitoshi Shimasaki
- Succeeded by: Multi-member district
- Constituency: National PR

Personal details
- Born: 1 May 1933
- Died: 10 January 2026 (aged 92)
- Party: Liberal Democratic
- Education: University of Tokyo

Ritsuko Nagao (Japanese: 長尾立子, romanized: Nagao Ritsuko; 1 May 1933 – 10 January 2026) was a Japanese politician who was the first woman to serve as the Minister of Justice.

In 1996, Nagao was appointed to the Cabinet of Japan as the Minister of Justice by Ryutaro Hashimoto, where she was the only woman and only appointee who was not a member of Parliament already. Before her appointment as the Minister of Justice, she worked as a bureaucrat in the Health and Welfare Ministry.

Nagao died on 10 January 2026, at the age of 92.
