= Ikuo Kamei =

Japanese politician (1933–2019)

- 亀井 郁夫
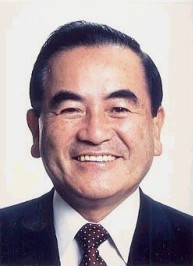
- Official portrait, 2002

Member of the House of Councillors
- In office 26 July 1998 – 25 July 2010
- Preceded by: Hiroshi Miyazawa
- Succeeded by: Yoichi Miyazawa
- Constituency: Hiroshima at-large

Member of the Hiroshima Prefectural Assembly
- In office 1987–1993
- Constituency: Hiba District

Personal details
- Born: 1 November 1933 Hiba, Hiroshima, Japan
- Died: 15 May 2019 (aged 85) Shōbara, Hiroshima, Japan
- Party: PNP (2005–2010)
- Other political affiliations: LDP (1987–2005)
- Relatives: Shizuka Kamei (brother)
- Education: University of Tokyo

Ikuo Kamei (亀井 郁夫, Kamei Ikuo; November 1, 1933 – May 15, 2019) was a Japanese politician of the People's New Party, a member of the House of Councillors in the Diet (national legislature). A native of Shōbara, Hiroshima and graduate of the University of Tokyo, he was elected to the House of Councillors for the first time in 1998 after serving in the assembly of Hiroshima Prefecture. Shizuka Kamei, a member of the House of Representatives, is his brother.
