= Anri Kawai =

Japanese politician

- 河井 案里
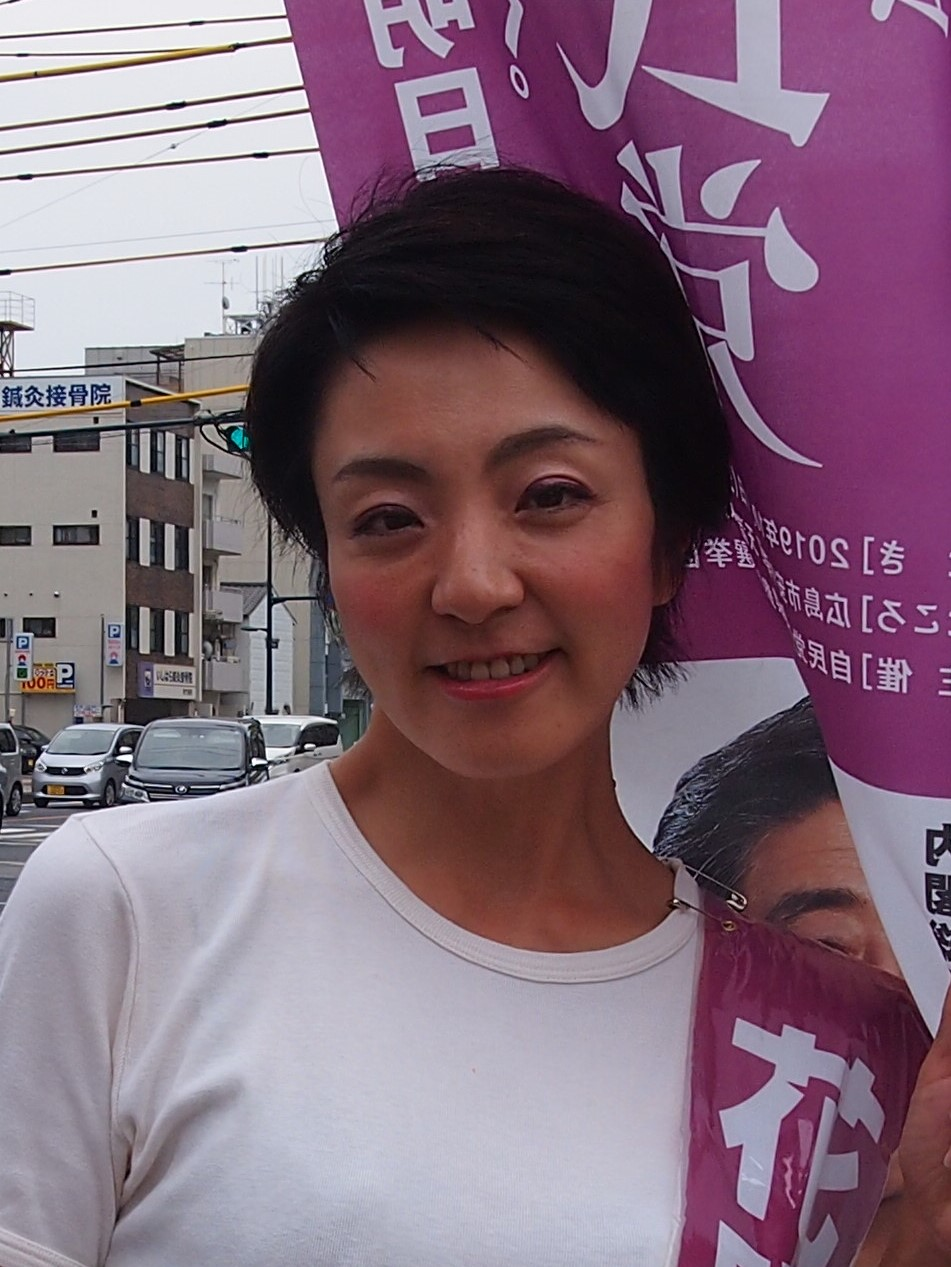
- Kawai in 2019

Member of the House of Councillors
- In office 21 July 2019 – 3 February 2021
- Preceded by: Kensei Mizote
- Succeeded by: Haruko Miyaguchi
- Constituency: Hiroshima at-large

Member of the Hiroshima Prefectural Assembly
- In office 30 April 2011 – 29 April 2019
- Constituency: Asaminami Ward, Hiroshima City
- In office 30 April 2003 – 22 October 2009
- Constituency: Asaminami Ward, Hiroshima City

Personal details
- Born: Anri Maeda (前田案里); 23 September 1973 (age 53) Nobeoka, Miyazaki, Japan
- Party: Independent
- Other political affiliations: LDP (2007–2009; 2019–2020)
- Spouse: Katsuyuki Kawai (m. 2001)
- Education: Keio University
- Website: http://www.anrinet.com/

Anri Kawai (河井 案里, Kawai Anri; born 23 September 1973) is a Japanese politician, formerly of the Liberal Democratic Party, and a former member of the House of Councillors in the Diet. Her husband is member of the House of Representatives and former Minister of Justice Katsuyuki Kawai. Born in Nobeoka, Miyazaki and a graduate of Keio University, she served in the assembly of Hiroshima Prefecture for four terms. On 20 January 2021, at the Tokyo District Court, she was convicted of vote-buying in the 2019 House of Councillors election.

== Election to the House of Councillors ==
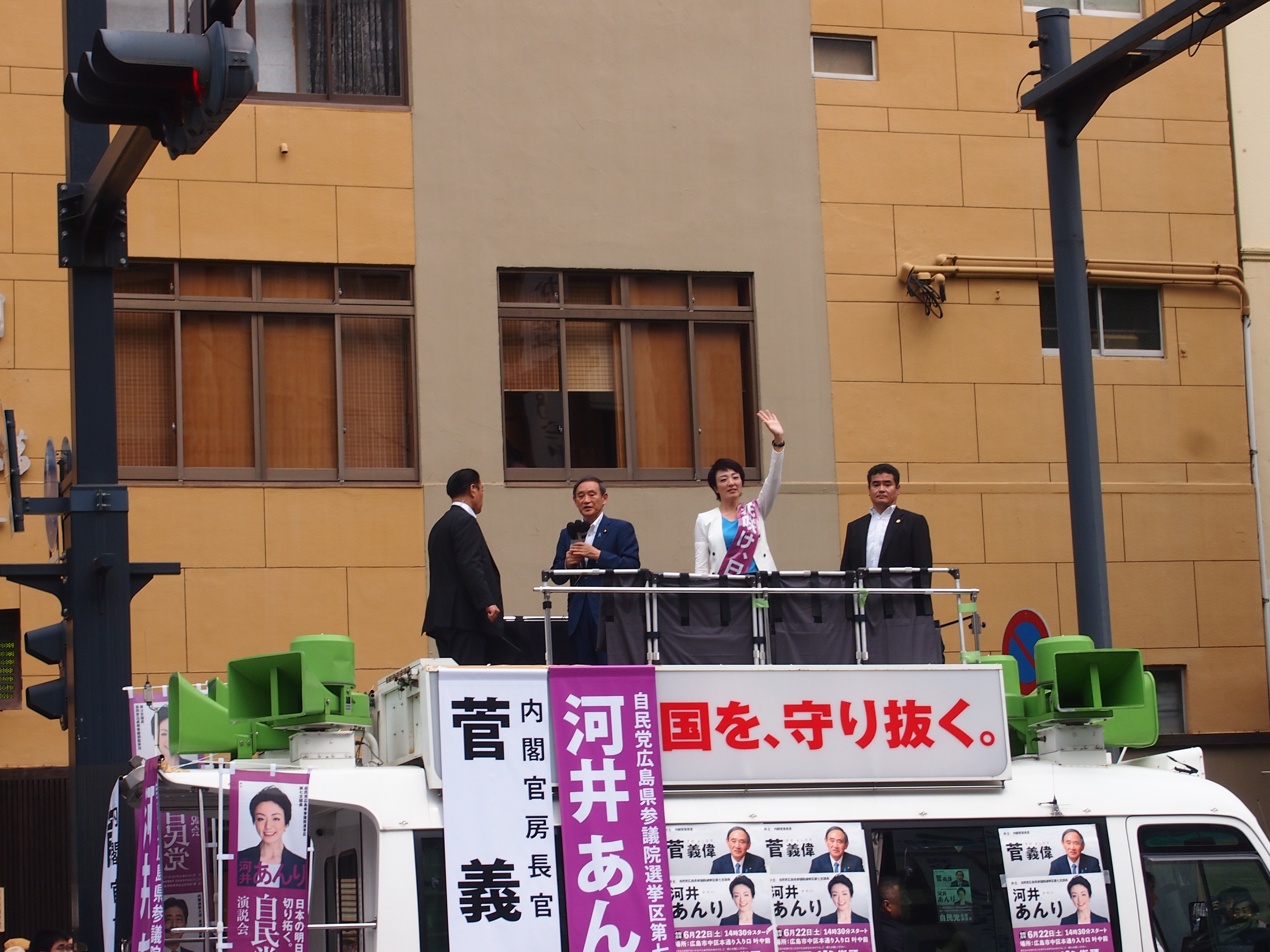
22 June 2019: campaigning with then Secretary-General Suga

In 2019, with the active support of party leaders such as Secretary-General Nikai and then Chief Cabinet Secretary Yoshihide Suga, Kawai campaigned for election to the House of Councillors. On 21 July, with 295,871 (29.0%) votes she was elected for Hiroshima in second place. In August of the same year, she joined the Sunflower Society (向日葵会), a group of 17 non-faction members who support Secretary of State Suga.

== Accusation of violation of public offices election law ==
After a report in the weekly magazine, Shukan Bunshun, that Anri Kawai's election office had allegedly paid campaign announcers a daily amount that exceeded the permitted legal limit, her husband Katsuyuki Kawai announced his resignation as Minister for Justice on 30 October 2019. Further revelations followed that the headquarters of the governing Liberal Democratic Party had transferred an unusually large amount of 150 million yen to the local Hiroshima office, prior to the election.

On 7 April 2020, the Mayor of Akiōta, Hiroshima resigned for having accepted 200,000 yen from Katsuyuki Kawai. Other alleged recipients of the cash gifts included several elected representatives in Akitakata, Hiroshima, amongst them the Mayor, the Speaker of the Municipal Assembly and the vice-Speaker. Hiroshi Kodama, the mayor of Akitakata, received 600,000 yen and appeared at a news conference on 26 June 2020 with a shaved head to express his remorse. A list of at least 100 recipients of money, including prefectural and municipal politicians from the Hiroshima prefecture, as well as members of the couple's campaign groups, was found on a computer belonging to Katsuyuki Kawai after a raid on the couple's house and offices.

On 16 June 2020, she and her husband, Katsuyuki Kawai, left the Liberal Democratic Party amidst the ongoing allegations of buying votes to aid her campaign for the House of Councilors. They were later arrested by public prosecutors on 19 June 2020 on charges of vote-buying and distributing around 25 million yen to politicians and supporters in Hiroshima in violation of the Public Office Elections Law.

Subsequently, in July 2020, the Hiroshima district and high court ruled that a state-paid secretary to Anri Kawai paid 2.04 million yen in total to 14 members of Kawai's campaign staff between 19 and 23 July 2019 during the election to the House of Councillors, an amount which implied payments higher than the legal limit of 15,000 yen per person per day. As a result, the secretary received a punishment of 18 months in prison, suspended for 5 years. In the wake of the conviction, the Hiroshima High Public Prosecutors Office filed a lawsuit to cancel Anri Kawai's 2019 election victory, on the basis of guilt by association as defined under the Japanese Public Offices Election Law.

== Conviction and sentence ==
On 20 January 2021, Anri Kawai was sentenced to a year and four months in prison, suspended for five years, at the Tokyo District Court. The court ruled that her distribution of money to local legislators in Hiroshima was in violation of the Public Offices Election Law. In the indictment, one member of the Etajima Municipal Assembly and four members of the Prefectural Assembly admitted receiving cash payments of ¥1.7 million in total. The local politicians stated that they believed Anri Kawai and her husband passed them the money to secure support for Anri Kawai in the Upper House election of 2019.

== After conviction ==
In January 2022, Kawai was taken to a hospital in Tokyo after overdosing on sleeping pills.
