= Yūzan Fujita =

Japanese politician

- 藤田 雄山

Governor of Hiroshima Prefecture
- In office 29 November 1993 – 28 November 2009
- Monarch: Akihito
- Preceded by: Toranosuke Takeshita
- Succeeded by: Hidehiko Yuzaki

Member of the House of Councillors
- In office 24 July 1989 – 10 November 1993
- Preceded by: Masaaki Fujita
- Succeeded by: Kensei Mizote
- Constituency: Hiroshima at-large

Personal details
- Born: 19 April 1949 Minami-ku, Hiroshima, Japan
- Died: 18 December 2015 (aged 66) Hiroshima, Japan
- Party: Liberal Democratic
- Parent: Masaaki Fujita (father)
- Relatives: Hiroo Ōhara (grandfather)
- Education: Keio University

Yūzan Fujita (藤田 雄山, Fujita Yūzan; April 19, 1949 – December 18, 2015) was a Japanese politician and the governor of Hiroshima Prefecture from 1993 to 2009. A native of Minami-ku, Hiroshima and graduate of Keio University, he had served in the House of Councillors in the Diet of Japan since 1989 for one term before being elected governor.

== Governor of Hiroshima prefecture ==
As governor, he protested the US-Indian agreement on nuclear cooperation of September 2008. In 2006, he opposed, along with other governors in Japan, the US plan to rearrange the deployment of US troops in Japan. On July 16, 2009, he reversed the policy of Hiroshima prefecture regarding compensations to hibakusha living outside Japan as he announced that he would not appeal a July 2008 ruling of the District Court of Hiroshima regarding such compensations to a hibakusha who had emigrated to Brazil.

== Notes ==
Preceded by Toranosuke Takeshita	Governor of Hiroshima Prefecture; 1993–2009	Succeeded by Hidehiko Yuzaki
