= Haruko Miyaguchi =

Japanese politician (born 1976)

- 宮口 治子
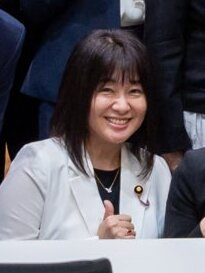

Member of the House of Councillors
- Incumbent
- Assumed office 25 April 2021
- Preceded by: Anri Kawai
- Constituency: Hiroshima at-large

Personal details
- Born: 5 March 1976 (age 50) Fukuyama, Hiroshima, Japan
- Party: Independent (since 2025)
- Other political affiliations: CDP (2021–2025)
- Spouse: Gen Fukuda
- Education: Osaka College of Music
- Website: https://www.miyaguchiharuko.net/

Haruko Miyaguchi (née Fukuda, born 5 March 1976) is a Japanese politician who has served as a member of the House of Councillors (the upper house of the National Diet) since 2021. She represents the Hiroshima at-large district. She was a member of the Constitutional Democratic Party of Japan, before leaving the party in January 2025.

== Career ==
Haruko Miyaguchi was born Haruko Fukuda in Hiroshima Prefecture on March 5, 1976. She attended the Osaka College of Music and graduated from the Department of Vocal Music. In 2000 she began working as a newscaster for Setonaikai Broadcasting Co. She held this post until 2010, when she began working for radio outlet Fukuyama Broadcasting Co., Ltd. In 2011, she became a freelance announcer. In 2014, she began working as the representative for the "Help Mark" initiative, created by the Tokyo Metropolitan Government in 2012 to help disabled people receive special treatment in public facilities. In 2021 she was elected to her present post in the House of Councillors. She currently serves on the Committee for Financial Affairs.
