= Hiroshima at-large district =

Japan House of Councillors constituency

- 広島県選挙区
- Parliamentary constituency for the House of Councillors
- Prefecture: Hiroshima
- Electorate: 2,297,308 (as of September 2022)

Current constituency
- Created: 1947
- Seats: 4
- Councillors: Class of 2019: Haruko Miyaguchi (Note: Anri Kawai, who had been elected in 2019 behind Morimoto, was convicted of vote-buying in 2021. Miyaguchi was elected in the single seat by-election later that year.) (CDP); Shinji Morimoto (CDP); Class of 2022: Yoichi Miyazawa (LDP); Eri Mikami (CDP)

Hiroshima at-large district is a constituency of the House of Councillors in the Diet of Japan (national legislature). It consists of Hiroshima Prefecture and elects four Councillors, two per election. The current Councillors are

- Minoru Yanagida (since 1998). Member of the Democratic party for the People.
- Shinji Morimoto (since 2013). Member of the Constitutional Democratic Party.
- Haruko Miyaguchi (since 2021). Member of the Constitutional Democratic Party.
- Yoichi Miyazawa (since 2010). Member of the Liberal Democratic Party.

== House of Councillors elected members ==
Class of (1947/1953/...)		Election	Class of (1950/1956/...)	
#1 1947: #1, 6 Year Term	#2 1947: #2 6 Year Term	Election	#1 1947: #3, 3 Year Term	#2 1947: #4, 3 Yeart Term
Shikazo Sasaki (Indep.)	Gishin Yamashita (Indep.)	1947	Setsuo Yamada (JSP)	Gesshū Iwamoto (Indep.)
Shikazo Sasaki (Indep.)	Gishin Yamashita (Indep.)	1950	Setsuo Yamada (JSP)	Takeichi Nita (Yoshida LP)
Tsunei Kusunose (Yoshida LP)	Gishin Yamashita (Indep.)	1950 by-el.	Setsuo Yamada (JSP)	Takeichi Nita (Yoshida LP)
Gishin Yamashita (Right JSP)	Kiichi Miyazawa (Yoshida LP)	1953	Setsuo Yamada (JSP)	Takeichi Nita (Yoshida LP)
Gishin Yamashita (Right JSP)	Kiichi Miyazawa (Yoshida LP)	1956	Mamoru Nagano (LDP)	Setsuo Yamada (JSP)
Kiichi Miyazawa (LDP)	Susumu Fujita (JSP)	1959	Mamoru Nagano (LDP)	Setsuo Yamada (JSP)
Kiichi Miyazawa (LDP)	Susumu Fujita (JSP)	1962	Tadayasu Iwasawa † 1966 (LDP)	Kenichi Matsumoto (JSP)
Masāki Fujita (LDP)	Susumu Fujita (JSP)	1965	Tadayasu Iwasawa † 1966 (LDP)	Kenichi Matsumoto (JSP)
Masāki Fujita (LDP)	Susumu Fujita (JSP)	1966 by-el.	Makoto Nakatsui (LDP)	Kenichi Matsumoto (JSP)
Masāki Fujita (LDP)	Susumu Fujita (JSP)	1968	Makoto Nakatsui (LDP)	Kenichi Matsumoto (JSP)
Masāki Fujita (LDP)	Susumu Fujita (JSP)	1971	Makoto Nakatsui (LDP)	Kenichi Matsumoto (JSP)
Masāki Fujita (LDP)	Susumu Fujita (JSP)	1974	Izuo Nagano † 1981 (LDP)	Manso Hamamoto (JSP)
Masāki Fujita (LDP)	Susumu Fujita (JSP)	1977	Izuo Nagano † 1981 (LDP)	Manso Hamamoto (JSP)
Masāki Fujita (LDP)	Susumu Fujita (JSP)	1980	Izuo Nagano † 1981 (LDP)	Hiroyuki KonishI (DSP)
Masāki Fujita (LDP)	Susumu Fujita (JSP)	1981 by-el.	Hiroshi Miyazawa (LDP)	Hiroyuki KonishI (DSP)
Masāki Fujita (LDP)	Manso Hamamoto (JSP)	1983	Hiroshi Miyazawa (LDP)	Hiroyuki KonishI (DSP)
Masāki Fujita (LDP)	Manso Hamamoto (JSP)	1986	Hiroshi Miyazawa (LDP)	Hiroyuki KonishI (DSP)
Manso Hamamoto (JSP)	Yūzan Fujita # 1993 (LDP)	1989	Hiroshi Miyazawa (LDP)	Hiroyuki KonishI (DSP)
Manso Hamamoto (JSP)	Yūzan Fujita # 1993 (LDP)	1992	Hiroshi Miyazawa (LDP)	Kimiko Kurihara (JSP)
Manso Hamamoto (JSP)	Kensei Mizote (LDP)	1993 by-el.	Hiroshi Miyazawa (LDP)	Kimiko Kurihara (JSP)
Kensei Mizote (LDP)	Kenji Sugekawa (NFP)	1995	Hiroshi Miyazawa (LDP)	Kimiko Kurihara (JSP)
Kensei Mizote (LDP)	Kenji Sugekawa (NFP)	1998	Ikuo Kamei (LDP)	Minoru Yanagida (Indep.)
Takeaki Kashimura (Indep.)	Kensei Mizote (LDP)	2001	Ikuo Kamei (LDP)	Minoru Yanagida (Indep.)
Takeaki Kashimura (Indep.)	Kensei Mizote (LDP)	2004	Minoru Yanagida (DPJ)	Ikuo Kamei (LDP)
Koji Sato (DPJ)	Kensei Mizote (LDP)	2007	Minoru Yanagida (DPJ)	Ikuo Kamei (LDP)
Koji Sato (DPJ)	Kensei Mizote (LDP)	2010	Yoichi Miyazawa (LDP)	Minoru Yanagida (DPJ)
Kensei Mizote (LDP)	Shinji Morimoto (DPJ)	2013	Yoichi Miyazawa (LDP)	Minoru Yanagida (DPJ)
Kensei Mizote (LDP)	Shinji Morimoto (DPJ)	2016	Yoichi Miyazawa (LDP)	Minoru Yanagida (DPJ)
Shinji Morimoto (Indep.)	Anri Kawai ‡ 2021 (LDP)	2019	Yoichi Miyazawa (LDP)	Minoru Yanagida (DPJ)
Shinji Morimoto (Indep.)	Haruko Miyaguchi (Concentration Hiroshima)	2021 by-el	Yoichi Miyazawa (LDP)	Minoru Yanagida (DPJ)
Shinji Morimoto (Indep.)	Haruko Miyaguchi (Concentration Hiroshima)	2022	Yoichi Miyazawa (LDP)	Eri Mikami (Indep.)

†: Died in office ‡: Election nullified #: Resigned to run for Governor

== Election results ==
2022
Party	Candidate	Votes	%	±%
LDP	Yoichi Miyazawa (Incumbent) (Endorsed by Komeito)	530,375	50.33%	▲0.57
Independent	Eri Mikami (Endorsed by Rally Hiroshima & RENGO)	259,363	24.61%	New
Ishin	Osamu Morikawa	114,442	10.86%	New
JCP	Takae Nakamura	58,461	5.55%	New
Sanseito	Chiharu Asai	52,969	5.03%	New
Anti-NHK	Toshimitsu Watanabe	11,087	1.05%	New
Independent	Noritoshi Tamada	7,335	0.70%	New
Happiness Realization	Masao Nomura	7,149	0.68%	New
Independent	Toshifumi Ubuhara	6,717	0.64%	New
Anti-NHK	Inokai Noriyuki	5,846	0.55%	New
Turnout		1,053,744	46.79%	▲13.18
