= Masaaki Fujita =

Japanese politician (1922–1996)

- 藤田 正明
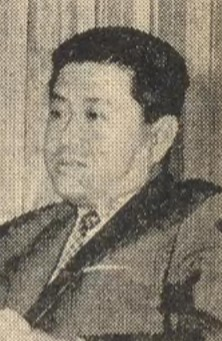
- Fujita in 1965

President of the House of Councillors
- In office 22 July 1986 – 30 September 1988
- Monarch: Hirohito
- Vice President: Hideyuki Seya
- Preceded by: Mutsuo Kimura
- Succeeded by: Yoshihiko Tsuchiya

Director-General of the Okinawa Development Agency
- In office 24 December 1976 – 28 November 1977
- Prime Minister: Takeo Fukuda
- Preceded by: Shōji Nishimura
- Succeeded by: Sakonshirō Inamura

Member of the House of Councillors
- In office 5 July 1965 – 9 July 1989
- Preceded by: Kiichi Miyazawa
- Succeeded by: Yūzan Fujita
- Constituency: Hiroshima at-large

Personal details
- Born: 3 January 1922 (age 104) Hiroshima, Japan
- Died: 27 May 1996 (aged 74)
- Party: Liberal Democratic
- Children: Yūzan Fujita
- Education: Waseda University

Masaaki Fujita (藤田 正明, Fujita Masaaki; January 3, 1922 – May 27, 1996) was a Japanese politician who served as a member of the House of Councillors. Fujita was born and brought up in Hiroshima City and he graduated from Waseda University in 1944. During his 30-year political career, he served in some important posts such as the Director General of Okinawa Development Agency (1976-1977) and the President of the House of Councillors (1986-1988). He received the Grand Cordon of the Order of the Rising Sun in 1992.
