= Ishikawa at-large district =

Japan House of Councillors constituency

- 石川県選挙区
- Parliamentary constituency for the House of Councillors
- Prefecture: Ishikawa
- Electorate: 935,591 (as of September 2022)

Current constituency
- Created: 1947
- Seats: 2
- Councillors: Class of 2019: Shuji Miyamoto (LDP); Class of 2022: Naoki Okada (LDP)

The Ishikawa at-large district (Japanese: 石川県選挙区, Hepburn: Ishikawa-ken senkyoku) is a constituency that represents Ishikawa Prefecture in the House of Councillors in the Diet of Japan. It has two Councillors in the 242-member house.

== Outline ==
The constituency represents the entire population of Ishikawa Prefecture. The district elects two Councillors to six-year terms, one at alternating elections held every three years. The district has 939,531 registered voters as of September 2015. The Councillors currently representing Ishikawa are:

- Naoki Okada (Liberal Democratic Party (LDP), second term; term ends in 2016)
- Syuji Yamada (LDP, first term; term ends in 2019)

== Elected Councillors ==
Class of 1947	election year	Class of 1950 (3-year term in 1947)
Kamejiro Hayashiya (Democratic)	1947	Kohei Nakagawa (Japan Liberal)
Kamejiro Hayashiya (Democratic)	1950	Kohei Nakagawa (Liberal)
Tokuji Imura (Note: Died in office 27 October 1958) (Kaishintō)	1953	Kohei Nakagawa (Liberal)
Tokuji Imura (Kaishintō)	1956	Kamejiro Hayashiya (LDP)
Wakio Shibano (Ind.) (Note: Later joined the LDP.)	1958 by-election (Note: Held 7 December 1958)	Kamejiro Hayashiya (LDP)
Tokujiro Toribatake (Ind.) (Note: Later joined the LDP.)	1959	Kamejiro Hayashiya (LDP)
Tokujiro Toribatake (Ind.)	1962	Kamejiro Hayashiya (LDP)
Shinji Toda (Note: Died in office 16 December 1970) (LDP)	1965	Kamejiro Hayashiya (LDP)
Shinji Toda (LDP)	1968	Takaaki Yasuta (LDP) (Note: Was first elected as an independent in 1968)
Hitoshi Shimasaki (LDP)	1971 by-election (Note: Held 7 February 1971)	Takaaki Yasuta (LDP)
Hitoshi Shimasaki (LDP)	1971	Takaaki Yasuta (LDP)
Hitoshi Shimasaki (LDP)	1974	Takaaki Yasuta (LDP)
Hitoshi Shimasaki (LDP)	1977	Takaaki Yasuta (LDP)
Hitoshi Shimasaki (LDP)	1980	Takaaki Yasuta (LDP)
Hitoshi Shimasaki (LDP)	1983	Takaaki Yasuta (LDP)
Hitoshi Shimasaki (LDP)	1986	Tetsuo Kutsukake (LDP)
Takashi Awamori (Rengō no Kai)	1989	Tetsuo Kutsukake (LDP)
Takashi Awamori (Rengō no Kai)	1992	Tetsuo Kutsukake (LDP)
Hiroshi Hase (Note: Resigned 12 May 2000) (LDP) (Note: Contested the election as an independent candidate endorsed by the LDP. Officially joined the party two months after his election.)	1995	Tetsuo Kutsukake (LDP)
Hiroshi Hase (LDP)	1998	Sota Iwamoto (Ind.)
Tetsuo Kutsukake (LDP)	2000 by-election (Note: Held 25 June 2000)	Sota Iwamoto (Ind.)
Tetsuo Kutsukake (LDP)	2001	Sota Iwamoto (Ind.)
Tetsuo Kutsukake (LDP)	2004	Naoki Okada (LDP)
Yasuo Ichikawa (DPJ)	2007	Naoki Okada (LDP)
Yasuo Ichikawa (DPJ)	2010	Naoki Okada (LDP)
Syuji Yamada (LDP)	2013	Naoki Okada (LDP)

== Election results ==
2022
Party	Candidate	Votes	%	±%
LDP	Naoki Okada (Incumbent)	274,253	64.53	
CDP	Tsuneko Oyamada	83,766	19.71	
JCP	Hiroshi Nishimura	23,119	5.44	
Sanseitō	Hitoshi Sakioki	21,567	5.07	
Anti-NHK	Shinichi Yamada	12,120	2.85	
Ishin Seito Shimpu	Takayuki Harihara	10,188	2.40	
Turnout				

April 2022 by-election
Party	Candidate	Votes	%	±%
LDP	Shuji Miyamoto	189,503	68.41	
CDP	Tsuneko Oyamada	59,906	21.63	
JCP	Hiroshi Nishimura	18,158	6.56	
Anti-NHK	Kenichiro Saito	9,430	3.40	
Turnout				

2019
Party	Candidate	Votes	%	±%
LDP	Shuji Yamada (Incumbent)	288,040	67.25	
DPP	Toru Tanabe	140,279	32.75	
Turnout				

2016
Party	Candidate	Votes	%	±%
LDP	Naoki Okada (Incumbent)	328,013	61.73	
Independent	Miki Shibata	191,371	36.01	
Happiness Realization	Satoshi Miyamoto	11,992	2.26	
Turnout				

2013
Party	Candidate	Votes	%	±%
LDP	Shuji Yamada	321,286	64.85	
Democratic	Yasuo Ichikawa (Incumbent)	113,817	22.97	
JCP	Ryosuke Kameda	40,295	8.13	
Independent	Shigeru Hamasaki	10,114	2.04	
Happiness Realization	Satoshi Miyamoto	9,935	2.01	
Turnout				

2010
Party	Candidate	Votes	%	±%
LDP	Naoki Okada (Incumbent)	304,511	55.50	
Democratic	Akira Nishihara	211,373	38.53	
JCP	Mikiko Chikamatsu	32,780	5.97	
Turnout				

2007
Party	Candidate	Votes	%	±%
Democratic	Yasuo Ichikawa	272,366	46.91	
LDP	Tomiro Yata	268,185	46.19	
JCP	Mikiko Chikamatsu	28,604	4.93	
Independent	Shigeru Hamasaki	11,477	1.98	
Turnout				

2004
Party	Candidate	Votes	%	±%
LDP	Naoki Okada	289,697	56.11	
Democratic	Takashi Kato	188,804	36.57	
JCP	Masayuki Sato	37,800	7.32	
Turnout				

== See also ==
- List of districts of the House of Councillors of Japan
