= Chair of the National Public Safety Commission =

Member of the Cabinet of Japan

- 国家公安委員会委員長
- Emblem of the Government of Japan

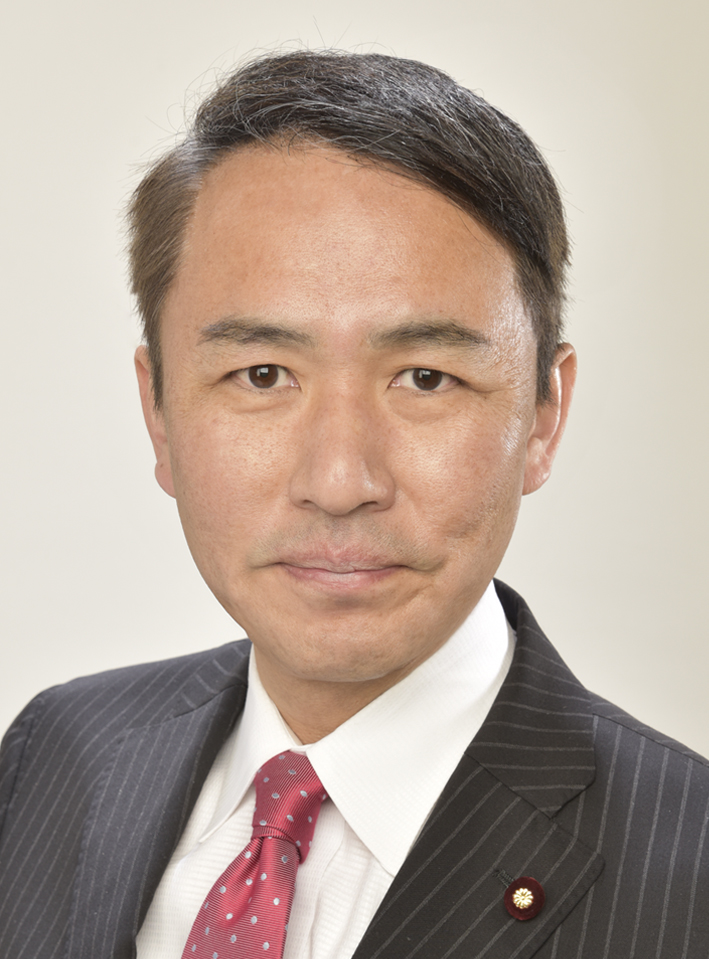
- Incumbent; Yasuhiro Hanashi since 17 September 2026
- National Public Safety Commission
- Member of: Cabinet of Japan; National Security Council; National Intelligence Council
- Reports to: Prime Minister of Japan
- Appointer: Prime Minister of Japan; attested to by the Emperor
- Precursor: Minister of Home Affairs
- Formation: 7 March 1948; 78 years ago
- Salary: ¥20,916,000

The Chair of the National Public Safety Commission (国家公安委員会委員長, Kokka-Kouan iinchou) is a member of the Cabinet of Japan and is the presiding officer of the National Public Safety Commission, which is the parent agency of the National Police Agency. The chairperson holds the rank of minister of state, and is a statutory member of the National Security Council. The chair is nominated by the Prime Minister of Japan and is appointed by the Emperor of Japan. The other five members of the commission must require the consent of both houses in the National Diet in order to serve.

The current Chairman is Yasuhiro Hanashi, who took office on 17 September 2026.

== List of chair of the National Public Safety Commission ==
Liberal (1950-1955)
Independent
Japan Democratic
Liberal Democratic
New Liberal Club
Japan New
Japan Socialist
Japan Renewal
Liberal (1998-2003)
Democratic

Chairperson			Term of office			Prime minister
#	Portrait	Name	Took office	Left office	Days	Prime minister
1		Zentarō Kosaka	1 July 1954	1 October 1954	92	Shigeru Yoshida
2		Naoshi Ohara	1 October 1954	10 December 1954	70	Shigeru Yoshida
3		Tadao Ohasa	10 December 1954	23 December 1956	744	Ichirō Hatoyama
ー		Tanzan Ishibashi (Acting)	23 December 1956	23 December 1956	0	Tanzan Ishibashi
4		Tomejiro Okubo	23 December 1956	10 July 1957	199	Tanzan Ishibashi
4		Tomejiro Okubo	23 December 1956	10 July 1957	199	Nobusuke Kishi
5		Matsutarō Shōriki	10 July 1957	12 June 1958	337	Nobusuke Kishi
6		Masashi Aoki	12 June 1958	18 June 1959	371	Nobusuke Kishi
7		Kanichiro Ishihara	18 June 1959	19 July 1960	397	Nobusuke Kishi
8		Iwao Yamazaki	19 July 1960	13 October 1960	86	Hayato Ikeda
9		Hideo Shuto	13 October 1960	8 December 1960	56	Hayato Ikeda
10		Ken Yasui	8 December 1960	18 July 1962	587	Hayato Ikeda
11		Kosaku Shinoda	18 July 1962	18 July 1963	365	Hayato Ikeda
12		Takashi Hayakawa	18 July 1963	25 March 1964	251	Hayato Ikeda
13		Masamichi Akazawa	25 March 1964	18 July 1964	115	Hayato Ikeda
14		Eichi Yoshitake	18 July 1964	3 June 1965	320	Hayato Ikeda
14		Eichi Yoshitake	18 July 1964	3 June 1965	320	Eisaku Satō
15		Tadanori Nagayama	3 June 1965	1 August 1966	424	Eisaku Satō
16		Shuji Shiomi	1 August 1966	3 December 1966	124	Eisaku Satō
17		Sensuke Fujieda	3 December 1966	25 November 1967	357	Eisaku Satō
18 (13)		Masamichi Akazawa	25 November 1967	30 November 1968	371	Eisaku Satō
19		Masuo Araki	30 November 1968	5 July 1971	947	Eisaku Satō
20		Torata Nakamura	5 July 1971	7 July 1972	368	Eisaku Satō
21		Takeo Kimura	7 July 1972	22 December 1972	168	Kakuei Tanaka
22		Masumi Esaki	22 December 1972	25 November 1973	338	Kakuei Tanaka
23		Kingo Machimura	25 November 1973	11 November 1974	351	Kakuei Tanaka
24		Hajime Fukuda	11 November 1974	15 September 1976	674	Kakuei Tanaka
24		Hajime Fukuda	11 November 1974	15 September 1976	674	Takeo Miki
25		Kimiyoshi Amano	15 September 1976	24 December 1976	100	Takeo Miki
26		Heiji Ogawa	24 December 1976	28 November 1977	339	Takeo Fukuda
27		Takenori Kato	28 November 1977	7 December 1978	374	Takeo Fukuda
28		Naozo Shibuya	7 December 1978	9 November 1979	337	Masayoshi Ōhira
29		Masaharu Gotōda	9 November 1979	17 July 1980	251	Masayoshi Ōhira
30		Jiro Ishiba	17 July 1980	17 December 1980	153	Zenkō Suzuki
31		Tōkichi Abiko	17 December 1980	30 November 1981	348	Zenkō Suzuki
32		Masataka Sekō	30 November 1981	27 November 1982	362	Zenkō Suzuki
33		Sachio Yamamoto	27 November 1982	27 December 1983	395	Yasuhiro Nakasone
34		Seiichi Tagawa	27 December 1983	1 November 1984	340	Yasuhiro Nakasone
35		Tōru Furuya	1 November 1984	28 December 1985	422	Yasuhiro Nakasone
36		Ichirō Ozawa	28 December 1985	22 July 1986	206	Yasuhiro Nakasone
37		Nobuyuki Hanashi	22 July 1986	6 November 1987	472	Yasuhiro Nakasone
38		Seiroku Kajiyama	6 November 1987	27 December 1988	417	Noboru Takeshita
39		Shigenobu Sakano	27 December 1988	10 August 1989	226	Noboru Takeshita
39		Shigenobu Sakano	27 December 1988	10 August 1989	226	Sōsuke Uno
40		Kōzō Watanabe	10 August 1989	28 February 1990	202	Toshiki Kaifu
41		Keiwa Okuda	28 February 1990	29 December 1990	304	Toshiki Kaifu
42		Akira Fukida	29 December 1990	5 November 1991	311	Toshiki Kaifu
43		Masajuro Shiokawa	5 November 1991	12 December 1992	403	Kiichi Miyazawa
44		Keijiro Murata	12 December 1992	9 August 1993	240	Kiichi Miyazawa
45		Kanju Sato	9 August 1993	28 April 1994	262	Morihiro Hosokawa
ー		Tsutomu Hata (Acting)	28 April 1994	28 April 1994	0	Tsutomu Hata
46		Hajime Ishii	28 April 1994	30 June 1994	63	Tsutomu Hata
47		Hiromu Nonaka	30 June 1994	8 August 1995	404	Tomiichi Murayama
48		Takashi Fukaya	8 August 1995	11 January 1996	156	Tomiichi Murayama
49		Hiroyuki Kurata	11 January 1996	7 November 1996	301	Ryutaro Hashimoto
50		Katsuhiko Shirakawa	7 November 1996	11 September 1997	308	Ryutaro Hashimoto
51		Mitsuhiro Uesugi	11 September 1997	30 July 1998	322	Ryutaro Hashimoto
52		Mamoru Nishida	30 July 1998	14 January 1999	168	Keizō Obuchi
53		Takeshi Noda	14 January 1999	5 October 1999	264	Keizō Obuchi
54		Kosuke Hori	5 October 1999	4 July 2000	273	Keizō Obuchi
54		Kosuke Hori	5 October 1999	4 July 2000	273	Yoshiro Mori
55 (52)		Mamoru Nishida	4 July 2000	5 December 2000	154	Yoshiro Mori
56		Bunmei Ibuki	5 December 2000	26 April 2001	142	Yoshiro Mori
57		Jin Murai	26 April 2001	30 September 2002	522	Junichiro Koizumi
58		Sadakazu Tanigaki	30 September 2002	22 September 2003	357	Junichiro Koizumi
59		Kiyoko Ono	22 September 2003	27 September 2004	371	Junichiro Koizumi
60		Yoshitaka Murata	27 September 2004	31 October 2005	399	Junichiro Koizumi
61		Tetsuo Kutsukake	31 October 2005	26 September 2006	330	Junichiro Koizumi
62		Kensei Mizote	26 September 2006	27 August 2007	335	Shinzo Abe
63		Shinya Izumi	27 August 2007	2 August 2008	341	Shinzo Abe
63		Shinya Izumi	27 August 2007	2 August 2008	341	Yasuo Fukuda
64		Motoo Hayashi	2 August 2008	24 September 2008	53	Yasuo Fukuda
65		Tsutomu Sato	24 September 2008	2 July 2009	281	Tarō Asō
66 (64)		Motoo Hayashi	2 July 2009	16 September 2009	76	Tarō Asō
67		Hiroshi Nakai	16 September 2009	17 September 2010	366	Yukio Hatoyama
67		Hiroshi Nakai	16 September 2009	17 September 2010	366	Naoto Kan
68		Tomiko Okazaki	17 September 2010	14 January 2011	119	Naoto Kan
69		Kansei Nakano	14 January 2011	2 September 2011	231	Naoto Kan
70		Kenji Yamaoka	2 September 2011	13 January 2012	133	Yoshihiko Noda
71		Jin Matsubara	13 January 2012	1 October 2012	262	Yoshihiko Noda
72		Tadamasa Kodaira	1 October 2012	26 December 2012	86	Yoshihiko Noda
73		Keiji Furuya	26 December 2012	3 September 2014	616	Shinzo Abe
74		Eriko Yamatani	3 September 2014	7 October 2015	399	Shinzo Abe
75		Taro Kono	7 October 2015	3 August 2016	301	Shinzo Abe
76		Jun Matsumoto	3 August 2016	3 August 2017	365	Shinzo Abe
77		Hachiro Okonogi	3 August 2017	2 October 2018	425	Shinzo Abe
78		Junzo Yamamoto	2 October 2018	11 September 2019	344	Shinzo Abe
79		Ryota Takeda	11 September 2019	16 September 2020	371	Shinzo Abe
80 (77)		Hachiro Okonogi	16 September 2020	25 June 2021	282	Yoshihide Suga
81		Yasufumi Tanahashi	25 June 2021	4 October 2021	101	Yoshihide Suga
82		Satoshi Ninoyu	4 October 2021	10 August 2022	310	Fumio Kishida
83		Koichi Tani	10 August 2022	13 September 2023	399	Fumio Kishida
84		Yoshifumi Matsumura	13 September 2023	1 October 2024	384	Fumio Kishida
85		Manabu Sakai	1 October 2024	21 October 2025	385	Shigeru Ishiba
86		Jiro Akama	21 October 2025	17 September 2026	331	Sanae Takaichi
87		Yasuhiro Hanashi	17 September 2026	Incumbent	6	Sanae Takaichi
