= Naoki Okada =

Japanese politician

- 岡田 直樹
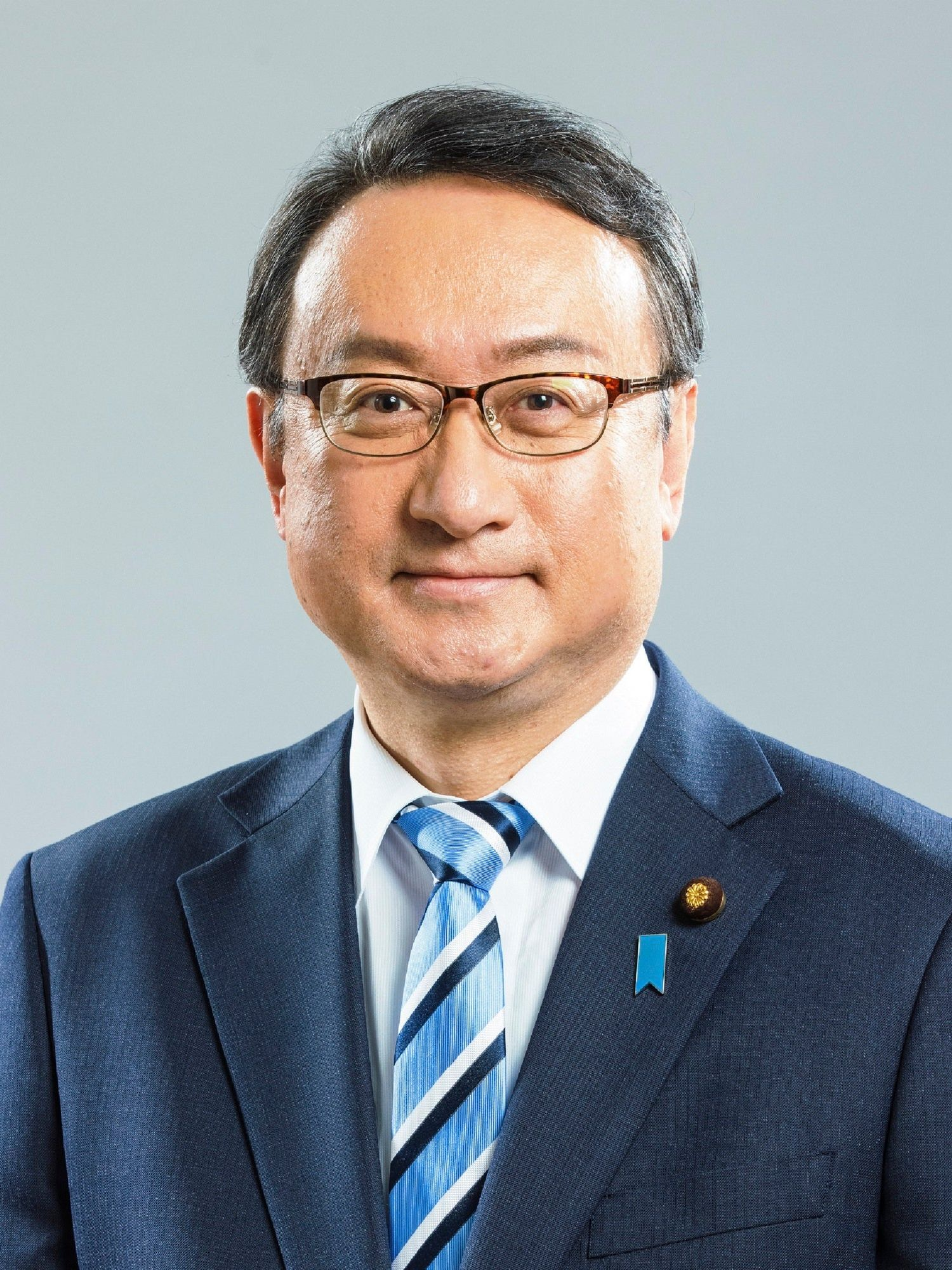
- Official portrait, 2022

Deputy Chief Cabinet Secretary (Political affairs, House of Councillors)
- In office 11 September 2019 – 4 October 2021
- Prime Minister: Shinzo Abe; Yoshihide Suga
- Preceded by: Kōtarō Nogami
- Succeeded by: Yoshihiko Isozaki

Member of the House of Councillors
- Incumbent
- Assumed office 26 July 2004
- Preceded by: Sōta Iwamoto
- Constituency: Ishikawa at-large

Member of the Ishikawa Prefectural Assembly
- In office 19 March 2002 – 29 April 2003
- Constituency: Kanazawa City

Personal details
- Born: 9 June 1962 (age 64) Kanazawa, Ishikawa, Japan
- Party: Liberal Democratic
- Education: University of Tokyo

Naoki Okada (岡田 直樹, Okada Naoki; born June 9, 1962) is a Japanese politician of the Liberal Democratic Party, a member of the House of Councillors in the Diet (national legislature).

== Career ==
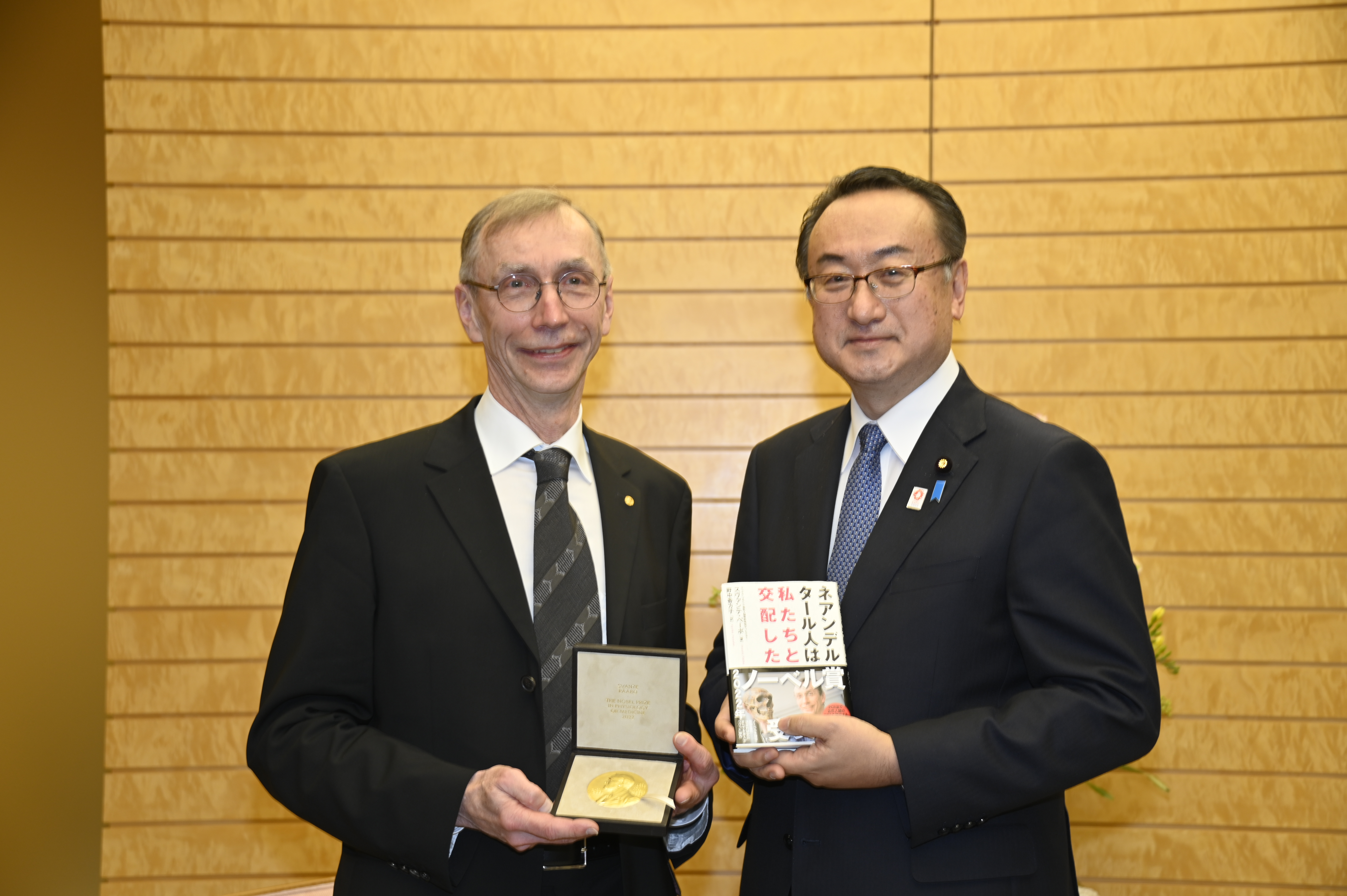
Okada with Svante Pääbo (at the Prime Minister's Official Residence on February 1, 2023)

A native of Kanazawa, Ishikawa and graduate of the University of Tokyo, he had worked at Hokkoku Shimbun, a regional newspaper in Kanazawa since 1989 and had served in the assembly of Ishikawa Prefecture since 2002. He was elected to the House of Councillors for the first time in 2004. He is the Minister in charge for regional revitalization under Prime Minister Fumio Kishida in the reshuffled Second Kishida Cabinet as of 10 August 2022.
