= Okayama 5th district =

Okayama 5th district was a constituency of the House of Representatives in the Diet of Japan (national legislature) from 1996 to 2024. It was located in Okayama Prefecture.

The district was created during the 1994 electoral reforms and it was abolished in 2022, in time for the 2024 Japanese general election.

== List of representatives ==
Representative	Party	Dates
Yoshitaka Murata	LDP	1996 – 2009
Katsunobu Katō	LDP	2009 – 2024
