= Yoshitaka Murata =

Japanese politician (born 1944)

- 村田 吉隆
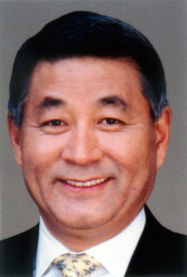
- Official portrait, 2005

Chairman of the National Public Safety Commission
- In office 27 September 2004 – 31 October 2005
- Prime Minister: Junichiro Koizumi
- Preceded by: Kiyoko Ono
- Succeeded by: Tetsuo Kutsukake

Member of the House of Representatives
- In office 18 February 1990 – 16 November 2012
- Preceded by: Yasuo Hayashi
- Succeeded by: Multi-member district
- Constituency: Okayama 2nd (1990–1996); Okayama 5th (1996–2009); Chūgoku PR (2009–2012)

Personal details
- Born: 30 July 1944 (age 82) Shizuoka, Japan
- Party: Liberal Democratic
- Education: Kyoto University

Third Realigned Koizumi Cabinet (2005-10-31)
- Secretary: Shinzō Abe
- Internal Affairs: Heizō Takenaka
- Justice: Seiken Sugiura
- Foreign Affairs: Taro Aso
- Finance: Sadakazu Tanigaki
- Education: Kenji Kosaka
- Health: Jirō Kawasaki
- Agriculture: Shoichi Nakagawa
- Economy: Toshihiro Nikai
- Land: Kazuo Kitagawa
- Environment: Yuriko Koike
- Defense: Fukushiro Nukaga
- Ministers of State: Tetsuo Kutsukake; Kaoru Yosano; Koki Chuma; Iwao Matsuda; Kuniko Inoguchi

Yoshitaka Murata (村田 吉隆, Murata Yoshitaka; born 30 July 1944) is a former Japanese politician who served as the Chairman of the National Public Safety Commission, the Minister of State for Disaster Management and the Minister of State for National Emergency Legislation in Japanese Prime Minister Junichiro Koizumi's Cabinet.

Born in the city of Shizuoka, Murata graduated from Faculty of Law, Kyoto University and joined the Ministry of Finance in 1968. In 1990, he was elected to the House of Representatives for the first time and, since September 2004 he has been on the present posts.
