= Kimiko Kurihara =

Japanese politician (born 1946)

- 栗原 君子

Chairwoman of the New Socialist Party
- In office 29 May 2005 – 24 July 2011
- Preceded by: Tatsukuni Komori
- Succeeded by: Yoshihiro Matsueda

Member of the House of Councillors
- In office 26 July 1992 – 25 July 1998
- Preceded by: Hiroyuki Konishi
- Succeeded by: Minoru Yanagida
- Constituency: Hiroshima at-large

Member of the Kumano Town Council
- In office 1975–1992

Personal details
- Born: 13 January 1946 (age 80) Kumano, Hiroshima, Japan
- Party: New Socialist
- Other political affiliations: Socialist (1975–1996)
- Education: Yasuda Girls Junior & Senior High School

Kimiko Kurihara (栗原 君子; Born January 13, 1946) is a Japanese politician.

== Early life and education ==
Kurihara was born on January 13, 1946, in Kumano, Hiroshima. When she was in her 20s she delivered newspapers and milk while raising three children.

== Political career ==
In 1975 Kurihara was elected to serve in the legislature for Kumano. She was elected to the House of Councillors in 1992, running on a campaign platform opposing the overseas deployment of the Japanese National Self-Defense Forces. She ran as a member of the Japanese Socialist Party. After her term ended she ran for her old seat, but was not reelected.
