= Kensei Mizote =

Japanese politician (1942–2023)

- 溝手 顕正
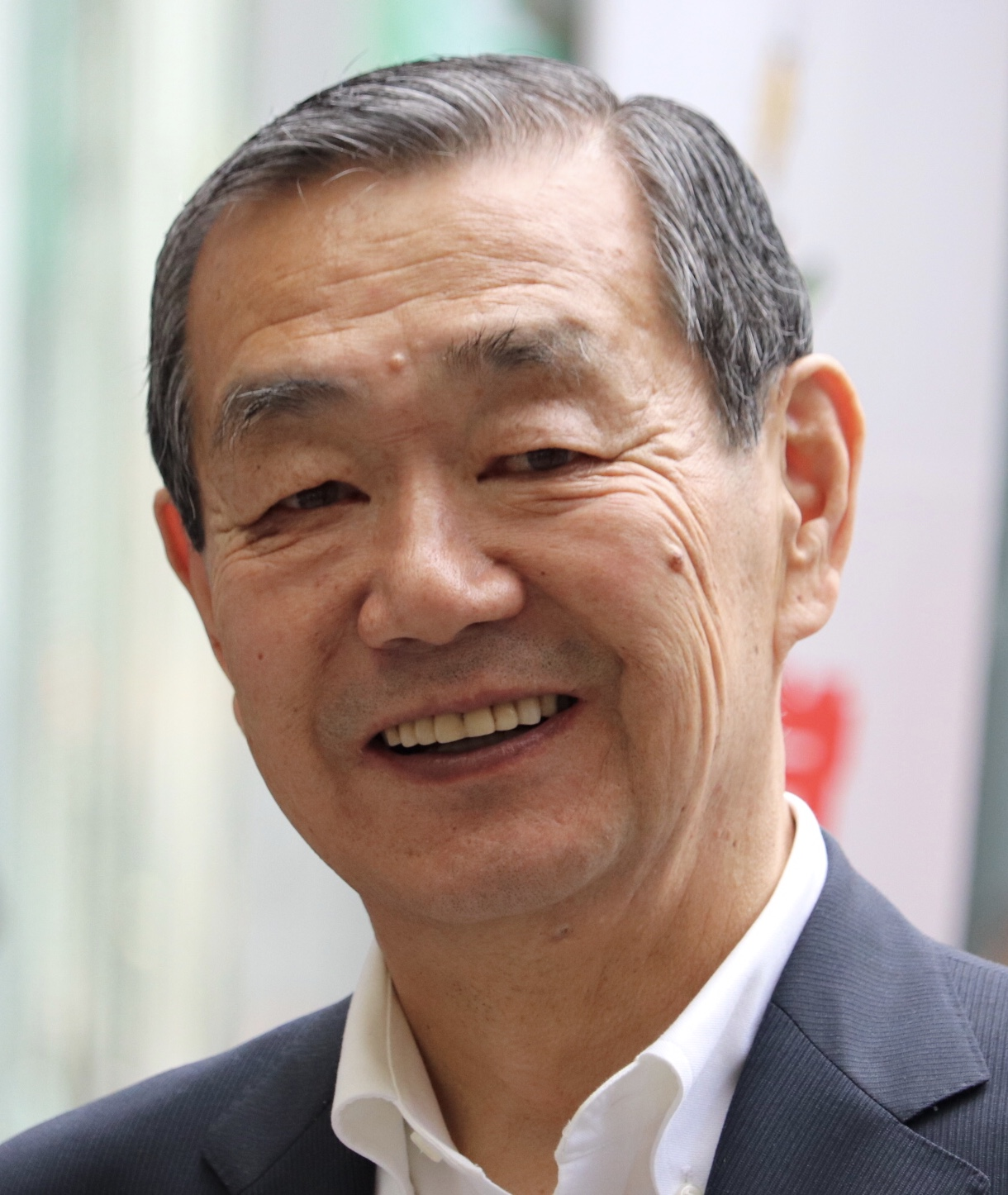
- Mizote in 2019

Chairman of the National Public Safety Commission
- In office 26 September 2006 – 27 August 2007
- Prime Minister: Shinzo Abe
- Preceded by: Tetsuo Kutsukake
- Succeeded by: Shinya Izumi

Member of the House of Councillors
- In office 5 December 1993 – 28 July 2019
- Preceded by: Yūzan Fujita
- Succeeded by: Anri Kawai
- Constituency: Hiroshima at-large

Mayor of Mihara
- In office 1987–1993
- Preceded by: Yoshi Doiyama
- Succeeded by: Seiji Yamamoto

Personal details
- Born: 13 September 1942 Minami, Hiroshima, Japan
- Died: 14 April 2023 (aged 80) Hiroshima, Japan
- Party: Liberal Democratic
- Education: University of Tokyo

Kensei Mizote (溝手 顕正, Mizote Kensei; 13 September 1942 – 14 April 2023) was a Japanese politician of the Liberal Democratic Party, a member of the House of Councillors in the Diet (national legislature).

== Career ==
A native of Hiroshima, Hiroshima and graduate of the University of Tokyo, he became mayor of Mihara, Hiroshima in 1987 and was elected to the House of Councillors for the first time in 1993. He died from complications of a stroke on April 14, 2023, at the age of 80.
