= Yasuo Ichikawa =

Japanese politician (born 1942)

- 一川 保夫
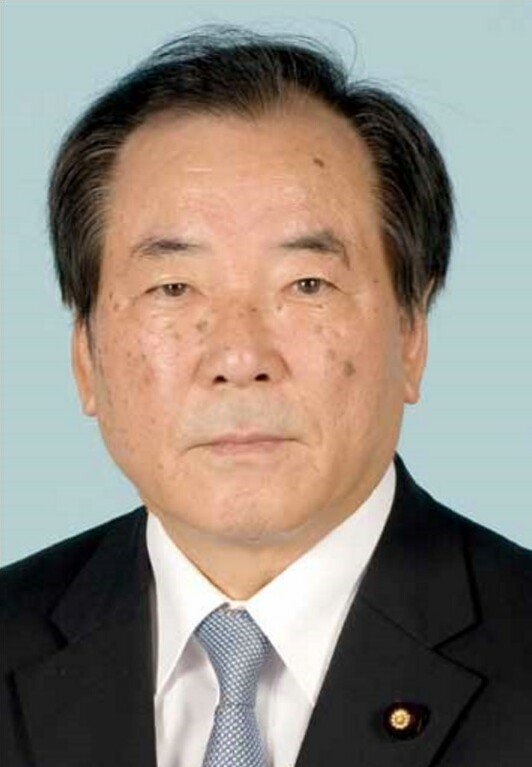
- Official portrait, 2011

Minister of Defence
- In office 2 September 2011 – 13 January 2012
- Prime Minister: Yoshihiko Noda
- Preceded by: Toshimi Kitazawa
- Succeeded by: Naoki Tanaka

Member of the House of Councillors
- In office 29 July 2007 – 28 July 2013
- Preceded by: Tetsuo Kutsukake
- Succeeded by: Syuji Yamada
- Constituency: Ishikawa at-large

Member of the House of Representatives
- In office 25 October 1996 – 8 August 2005
- Preceded by: Constituency established
- Succeeded by: Multi-member district
- Constituency: Hokuriku-Shin'etsu PR

Member of the Ishikawa Prefectural Assembly
- In office 30 April 1991 – 1 October 1996
- Constituency: Komatsu City

Personal details
- Born: 6 February 1942 (age 84) Komatsu, Japan
- Party: CDP (2022–present)
- Other political affiliations: LDP (1976–1993); JRP (1993–1994); NFP (1994–1998); LP (1998–2003); DPJ (2003–2017)
- Education: Mie University

Yasuo Ichikawa (一川 保夫, Ichikawa Yasuo; born 6 February 1942) is a former Japanese politician of the Democratic Party of Japan who served as the Minister of Defence from 2011 to 2012.

== Career ==
A native of Komatsu, Ishikawa and graduate of Mie University, he worked at the Ministry of Agriculture, Forestry and Fisheries from 1965 to 1990, and had served in the assembly of Ishikawa Prefecture for two terms since 1991. He was elected to the House of Representatives for the first time in 1996 as a member of the New Frontier Party by proportional representation – he failed to win the Ishikawa 2nd district from Liberal Democrat Yoshirō Mori four times in a row. After losing also his proportional seat in 2005, he was elected to the House of Councillors for the first time in 2007. In 2011, under Prime Minister Yoshihiko Noda's cabinet, he was selected as Minister of Defense.

In December 2011 he was the subject of a censure motion from the opposition LDP for failing to know the details of the 1995 rape where three US servicemen kidnapped and sexually assaulted a 12-year-old girl. This followed his subordinate Satoshi Tanaka speaking with reporters in a bar and using euphemisms for sexual assault to discuss moving the US Futenma airbase. Tanaka was sacked as director of the Okinawa Defense Bureau, and in the cabinet reshuffle of January 13, 2012 Ichikawa was replaced by Naoki Tanaka.

Political offices
| Preceded by Toshimi Kitazawa | Minister of Defence; 2011–2012 | Succeeded by Naoki Tanaka |
House of Councillors
| Preceded by Tetsuo Kutsukake | Councillor from Ishikawa; 2007–2013 | Succeeded by Shūji Yamada |
House of Representatives (Japan)
| New creation | Representative by proportional representation for Hokuriku-Shin'etsu; 1996–2005 | Succeeded by N/A |
