= Toshimi Kitazawa =

Japanese politician (born 1938)

- 北澤 俊美
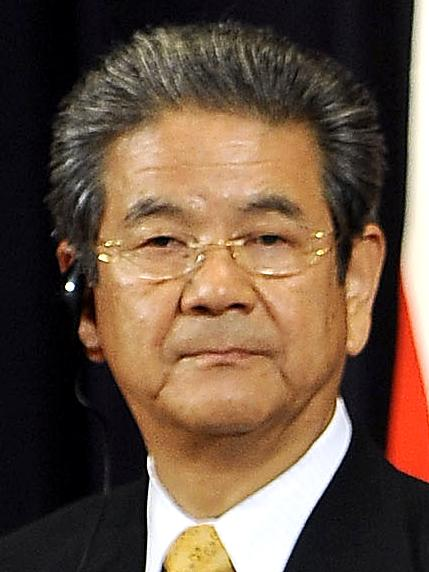
- Kitazawa in 2009

Minister of Defense
- In office 16 September 2009 – 2 September 2011
- Prime Minister: Yukio Hatoyama; Naoto Kan
- Preceded by: Yasukazu Hamada
- Succeeded by: Yasuo Ichikawa

Member of the House of Councillors
- In office 26 July 1992 – 25 July 2016
- Preceded by: Ippei Koyama
- Succeeded by: Hideya Sugio
- Constituency: Nagano at-large

Member of the Nagano Prefectural Assembly
- In office 1975–1992
- Constituency: Nagano City

Personal details
- Born: 6 March 1938 (age 88) Nagano City, Nagano, Japan
- Party: CDP (since 2020)
- Other political affiliations: LDP (1975–1993); JRP (1993–1994); NFP (1994–1996); SP (1996–1998); GGP (1998); DPJ (1998–2016); DP (2016–2018); Independent (2018–2020)
- Education: Waseda University

Toshimi Kitazawa (北澤 俊美, Kitazawa Toshimi; born March 6, 1938) is a previous Japanese defence minister. He is a politician of the Democratic Party of Japan, a member of the House of Councillors in the Diet (national legislature). A native of Nagano City and graduate of Waseda University, he was elected to the House of Councillors for the first time in 1992 after serving in the assembly of Nagano Prefecture for five terms. He had joined the Democratic Party of Japan in 1998. On 16 September 2009; Kitazawa was appointed the Minister of Defence by Prime Minister Yukio Hatoyama. He was re-appointed by Prime Minister Naoto Kan in the cabinet shift, and was the Minister of Defence until 2 September 2011.

He retired in 2016, and was succeeded by Hideya Sugio.

House of Councillors
| Preceded by Ippei Koyama; Kazuto Mukaiyama | Councillor for Nagano; 1992–present Served alongside: Kiyoshi Imai, Masatoshi Wakabayashi, Kenta Wakabayashi | Incumbent |
Political offices
| Preceded by Yasukazu Hamada | Minister of Defence; 2009–2011 | Succeeded by Yasuo Ichikawa |
