= Hiroshima 6th district =

Japan House of Representatives constituency

- Parliamentary constituency for the Japanese House of Representatives
- Numbered map of the Hiroshima Prefecture single seats
- Prefecture: Hiroshima
- Proportional District: Chūgoku
- Electorate: 376,408

Current constituency
- Created: 1994
- Seats: One
- Party: LDP
- Representative: Fumiaki Kobayashi
- Municipalities: Fukuyama.

Hiroshima 6th district (広島県第6区, Hiroshima-ken dai-rokku or simply 広島6区, Hiroshima-rokku) is a single-member constituency of the House of Representatives in the national Diet of Japan located in Hiroshima Prefecture.

== Areas covered ==
=== Since 2022 ===
- Fukuyama

=== 2013 - 2022 ===
- Fuchū
- Part of Mihara
- Miyoshi
- Part of Onomichi
- Shōbara
- Jinseki District
- Sera District

=== 1994 - 2013 ===
- Fuchū
- Innoshima
- Mihara
- Miyoshi
- Onomichi
- Shōbara
- Futami District
- Hiba District
- Jinseki District
- Kōnu District
- Mitsugi District
- Sera District

== List of representatives ==
Election	Representative	Party	Notes
1996	Shizuka Kamei	LDP	
2000	Shizuka Kamei	LDP	
2003	Shizuka Kamei	LDP	
2005	Shizuka Kamei	PNP	
2009	Shizuka Kamei	PNP	
2009	Shizuka Kamei	Independent	
2009	Shizuka Kamei	TCJ	
2012	Shizuka Kamei	Tomorrow	
2012	Shizuka Kamei	Green Wind	
2014	Shizuka Kamei	Independent	
2017	Koji Sato	Kibō	
2017	Koji Sato	Independent	
2021	Koji Sato	CDP	
2024	Fumiaki Kobayashi	LDP	
2026	Fumiaki Kobayashi	LDP	

== Election results ==
=== 2026 ===
2026
Party	Candidate	Votes	%	±%
LDP	Fumiaki Kobayashi	119,827	67.02	
Centrist Reform	Tomoko Hata	49,469	27.67	
JCP	Koji Shigemura	9,505	5.32	
Majority		70,358	39.35	
Registered electors		372,139		
Turnout			49.34	▲4.54
LDP hold				

=== 2024 ===
2024
Party	Candidate	Votes	%	±%
LDP	Fumiaki Kobayashi	97,991	60.12	
CDP	Shinya Inoue	52,852	32.43	
JCP	Koji Shigemura	12,154	7.46	N/A
Majority		45,139	27.69	
Registered electors		375,403		
Turnout			44.80	▼11.55
LDP gain from CDP				

=== 2021 ===
2021
Party	Candidate	Votes	%	±%
CDP	Koji Sato	83,796	51.42	
LDP	Toshifumi Kojima (Won PR seat)	79,158	48.58	
Majority		4,638	2.84	
Registered electors		294,154		
Turnout			56.35	▲0.69
CDP hold				

=== 2017 ===
2017
Party	Candidate	Votes	%	±%
Kibō no Tō	Koji Sato	85,616	50.54	
LDP	Toshifumi Kojima (Won PR seat)	69,209	40.85	
JCP	Akimitsu Terada	14,585	8.61	
Majority		16,407	9.69	
Registered electors		310,908		
Turnout			55.66	▼0.41
Kibō no Tō gain from Independent				

=== 2014 ===
2014
Party	Candidate	Votes	%	±%
Independent	Shizuka Kamei	89,756	52.16	
LDP	Toshifumi Kojima (Won PR seat)	65,494	38.06	
JCP	Akimitsu Terada	16,839	9.79	
Majority		24,262	14.10	
Registered electors		314,804		
Turnout			56.07	▼4.47
Independent hold				

=== 2012 ===
2012
Party	Candidate	Votes	%	±%
Tomorrow	Shizuka Kamei	91,078	49.00	New
LDP	Toshifumi Kojima (Won PR seat)	78,747	42.37	
JCP	Tamiyo Hanaoka	16,046	8.63	
Majority		12,331	6.63	
Registered electors		321,391		
Turnout			60.54	▼10.78
Tomorrow hold				

=== 2009 ===
2009
Party	Candidate	Votes	%	±%
People's New	Shizuka Kamei	137,287	60.17	
LDP	Toshifumi Kojima	69,808	30.60	N/A
JCP	Tamiyo Hanaoka	17,383	7.62	N/A
Happiness Realization	Kyoko Ebisumoto	3,689	1.62	New
Majority		67,479	29.57	
Registered electors		331,003		
Turnout			71.32	
People's New hold				

=== 2005 ===
2005
Party	Candidate	Votes	%	±%
People's New	Shizuka Kamei	110,979	41.53	New
Independent	Takafumi Horie	84,433	31.60	New
Democratic	Koji Sato	68,365	25.58	
Independent	Yoji Ito	3,433	1.28	New
Majority		26,546	9.93	
Registered electors				
Turnout				
People's New hold				

=== 2003 ===
2003
Party	Candidate	Votes	%	±%
LDP	Shizuka Kamei	117,659	51.34	
Democratic	Koji Sato (Won PR seat)	100,677	43.93	
JCP	Akimitsu Terada	10,846	4.73	
Majority		16,982	7.41	
Registered electors				
Turnout				
LDP hold				

=== 2000 ===
2000
Party	Candidate	Votes	%	±%
LDP	Shizuka Kamei	138,790	57.92	
Liberal	Koji Sato (Won PR seat)	81,181	33.88	New
JCP	Yoshihiko Murakami	19,640	8.20	
Majority		57,609	24.04	
Registered electors				
Turnout				
LDP hold				

=== 1996 ===
1996
Party	Candidate	Votes	%	±%
LDP	Shizuka Kamei	122,071	48.84	New
New Frontier	Koji Sato	88,391	35.37	New
New Socialist	Tatsukuni Komori	29,092	11.64	New
JCP	Tomoyuki Hashimoto	10,373	4.15	New
Majority		33,680	13.47	
Registered electors				
Turnout				
LDP win (new seat)				
