= Hiroyuki Konishi (politician, born 1936) =

Japanese politician (1936–2022)

- 小西 博行

Member of the House of Councillors
- In office 8 July 1980 – 25 July 1992
- Preceded by: Mansō Hamamoto
- Succeeded by: Kimiko Kurihara
- Constituency: Hiroshima at-large

Personal details
- Born: 19 October 1936 Zentsūji, Kagawa, Japan
- Died: 23 January 2022 (aged 85) Kure, Hiroshima, Japan
- Party: Democratic Socialist
- Other political affiliations: Democratic Reform
- Education: Kōchi University

Hiroyuki Konishi (Japanese: 小西博行 Konishi Hiroyuki; 19 October 1936 – 23 January 2022) was a Japanese politician.

A member of the Democratic Socialist Party, he served in the House of Councillors from 1980 to 1992. He died in Kure on 23 January 2022, at the age of 85.
