= Hiroshi Miyazawa =

Japanese politician (1921–2012)

- 宮澤 弘

Minister of Justice
- In office 9 October 1995 – 11 January 1996
- Prime Minister: Tomiichi Murayama
- Preceded by: Tomoharu Tazawa
- Succeeded by: Ritsuko Nagao

Member of the House of Councillors
- In office 30 November 1981 – 25 July 1998
- Preceded by: Izuo Nagano
- Succeeded by: Ikuo Kamei
- Constituency: Hiroshima at-large

Governor of Hiroshima
- In office 16 December 1973 – 29 October 1981
- Monarch: Hirohito
- Preceded by: Izuo Nagano
- Succeeded by: Toranosuke Takeshita

Personal details
- Born: 22 September 1921 Fukuyama, Hiroshima, Japan
- Died: 26 May 2012 (aged 90) Shibuya, Tokyo, Japan
- Party: Liberal Democratic
- Children: Yoichi Miyazawa
- Relatives: Kiichi Miyazawa (brother)
- Education: Tokyo Imperial University

Hiroshi Miyazawa (宮澤 弘, Miyazawa Hiroshi; 22 September 1921 – 26 May 2012) was a Japanese politician who served as the Governor of Hiroshima Prefecture from 1973 to 1981 and the Minister of Justice from 1995 to 1996.

== Biography ==
Miyazawa was born in 1921. He was the younger brother of Kiichi Miyazawa.

He was elected as governor of Hiroshima in December 1973 for the Liberal Democratic Party, and defeated the Japanese Communist Party candidate Noriaki Yamada. As governor he advocated greater autonomy for local governors.

On 9 October 1996, he was appointed Minister of Justice and replaced Tomoharu Tazawa in the post. During his tenure Miyazawa tried to use the anti-subversion law against the Aum Shinrikyo sect.

In September 2000, as a private citizen, Miyazawa penned an article in Asahi Shimbun, in which he criticized local authorities in Japan for refusing to enroll children of Aum Shinrikyo members in schools.

Political offices
Preceded by Izuo Nagano	Governor of Hiroshima Prefecture; 1973–1981	Succeeded by Toranosuke Takeshita
Preceded by Tomoharu Tazawa	Minister of Justice; 1995–1996	Succeeded by Ritsuko Nagao
House of Councillors
Preceded by Susumu Mogami	Chair, Foreign Affairs Committee of the House of Councillors of Japan; 1986–1987	Succeeded by Mayumi Moriyama
Preceded by Hiroshi Ōki	Chair, Commerce and Industry Committee of the House of Councillors of Japan; 1988–1989	Succeeded by Hiroyuki Kurata
