= Shuji Miyamoto =

Japanese politician (born 1972)

- 宮本 周司
- Official portrait, 2024

Member of the House of Councillors
- Incumbent
- Assumed office 26 April 2022
- Preceded by: Shūji Yamada
- Constituency: Ishikawa at-large
- In office 29 July 2013 – 7 April 2022
- Preceded by: Multi-member district
- Succeeded by: Hiroshi Nakada
- Constituency: National PR

Personal details
- Born: 27 March 1971 (age 55) Tatsunokuchi, Ishikawa, Japan
- Party: Liberal Democratic
- Education: Tokyo Keizai University

Shuji Miyamoto (宮本周司, Miyamoto Shuji; born 27 March 1971) is a Japanese politician serving as a member of the House of Councillors since 2013. He has served as chairman of the Liberal Democratic Party in Ishikawa Prefecture since 2022.
