= Yasuhiro Hanashi =

Japanese politician

- 葉梨 康弘
- Official portrait, 2026

Chairman of the National Public Safety Commission
- Incumbent
- Assumed office 17 September 2026
- Prime Minister: Sanae Takaichi
- Preceded by: Jiro Akama

Minister of Justice
- In office 10 August 2022 – 11 November 2022
- Prime Minister: Fumio Kishida
- Preceded by: Yoshihisa Furukawa
- Succeeded by: Ken Saitō

Member of the House of Representatives for Ibaraki 3rd district
- Incumbent
- Assumed office 16 November 2012
- Preceded by: Toshiaki Koizumi
- In office 10 October 2003 – 18 August 2009
- Preceded by: Nobuyuki Hanashi
- Succeeded by: Toshiaki Koizumi

Personal details
- Born: 12 October 1959 (age 67) Mitaka, Tokyo, Japan
- Party: Liberal Democratic
- Education: University of Tokyo

Yasuhiro Hanashi (葉梨 康弘, Hanashi Yasuhiro, born 1959) is a Japanese politician who served as the Minister of Justice from August to November 2022. He is a member of the Liberal Democratic Party and has served in the House of Representatives from 2003 to 2009 and again since 2012.

A native of Ibaraki Prefecture and graduate of the University of Tokyo he joined the National Police Agency in 1982 becoming the director in the Juvenile Community Safety division. After leaving the agency in 1999, he was elected to public office for the first time in 2003 representing Ibaraki 3rd district, which includes the cities of Ryugasaki and Ushiku, among others. He also served as Vice Minister of Justice in 2017, and Vice Minister of Agriculture, Forestry, and Fisheries in 2020.

Hanashi resigned as Justice Minister on 11 November 2022 following comments he made to a political gathering earlier in the week suggesting that the Justice Minister was a “unspectacular position” that became "a top story in daytime news programs only when stamping a seal on documents of execution." and “Serving as justice minister won't help raise much money or secure many votes”. Opposition leaders like Akira Koike of the Japanese Communist Party said that Hanashi was disrespecting the post and its responsibilities, as well as making light of the death penalty. Hasashi’ comments follow a string of highly publicized LDP scandals like the Unification Church Scandal, that deeply harmed the party’s reputation, and led Prime Minister Kishida to take a firm stance against scandal in the Party. He dismissed 4 ministers in a cabinet reshuffle to solidify this stance.

Political offices
Preceded by Yoshihisa Furukawa	Minister of Justice; 2022	Succeeded by Ken Saitō
