= National Public Safety Commission (Japan) =

Japanese government commission

- 国家公安委員会; Kokka Kōan Iinkai

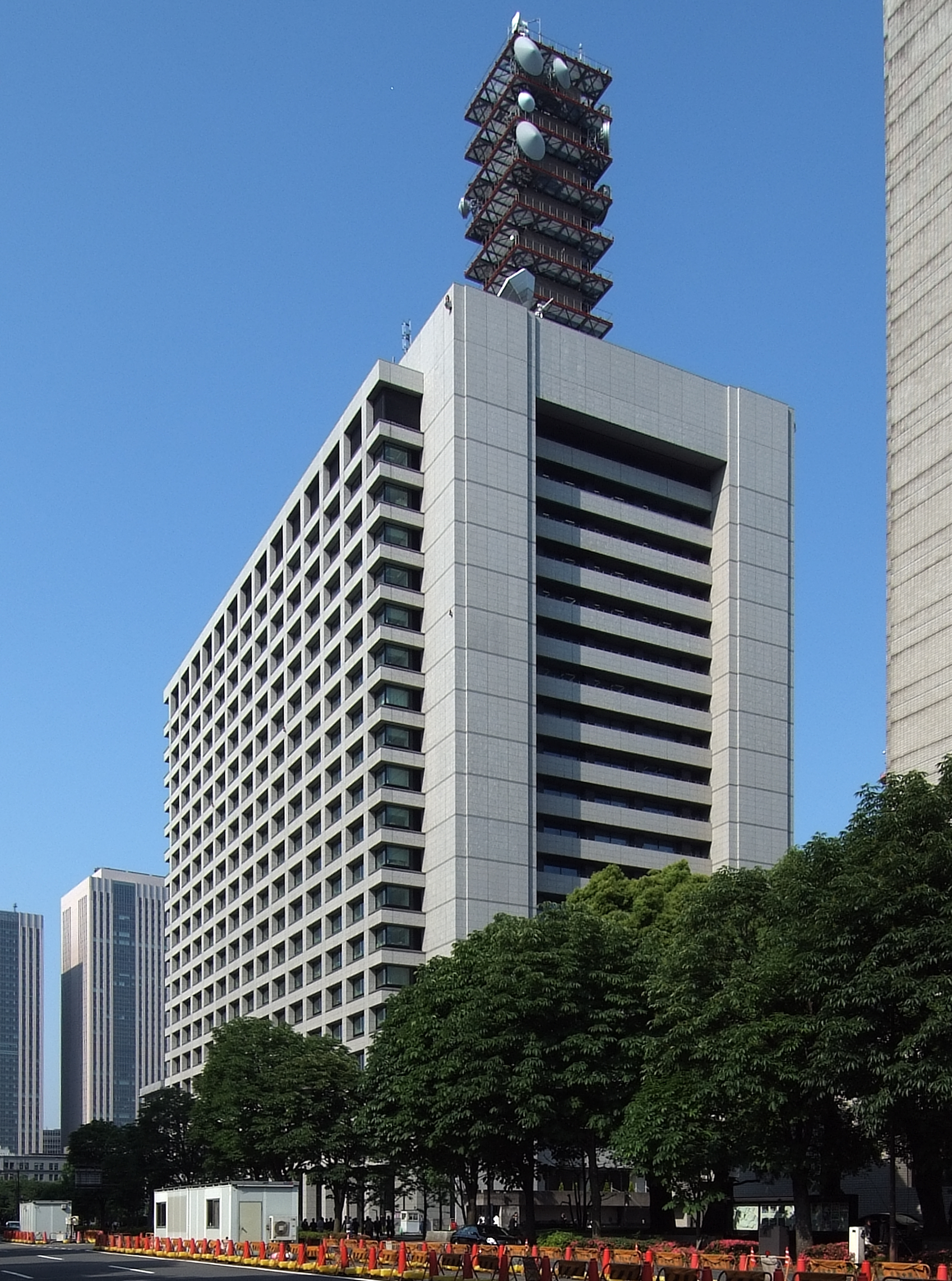
- 2nd Building of the Central Common Government Office

Agency overview
- Formed: 1947
- Jurisdiction: Government of Japan
- Headquarters: 2-1-2 Kasumigaseki, Chiyoda-ku, Tokyo, Japan
- Agency executive: Yasuhiro Hanashi, Chairman
- Website: www.npsc.go.jp (in Japanese)

The National Public Safety Commission (国家公安委員会, Kokka Kōan Iinkai) is a Japanese Cabinet Office commission. It is headquartered in the 2nd Building of the Central Common Government Office at 2-1-2 Kasumigaseki in Kasumigaseki, Chiyoda, Tokyo.

The commission consists of a chairperson who holds the rank of Minister of State and five other members appointed by the prime minister, with consent of both houses of the Diet. The commission operates independently of the cabinet, but coordinates with it through the Minister of State.

The commission's function is to guarantee the neutrality of the police system by insulating the force from political pressure and ensuring the maintenance of democratic methods in police administration. It administers the National Police Agency, and has the authority to appoint or dismiss senior police officers.

== List of current members ==
- Yasuhiro Hanashi (Chairman; from Liberal Democratic Party)
- Yukio Takebe (Businessman, Adviser to Mitsui & Co.)
- Hirotomo Nomura (Newsman, former chairman of Nikkei Business Publications)
- Hitomi Akiyoshi (Jurist, former president of the Takamatsu High Court)
- Kōichi Aiboshi (Former Ambassador to South Korea)
- Kazue Sako (Engineer, professor at Waseda University)

== List of former chairperson ==
- Kenji Yamaoka
- Sadakazu Tanigaki
- Hiroshi Nakai
- Kansei Nakano
- Junzo Yamamoto
- Hachiro Okonogi
- Yasufumi Tanahashi
- Satoshi Ninoyu
- Koichi Tani
- Yoshifumi Matsumura
- Manabu Sakai

== History ==
The Japanese government established a European-style civil police system in 1874, under the centralized control of the Police Bureau within the Home Ministry, to put down internal disturbances and maintain order during the Meiji Restoration. By the 1880s, the police had developed into a nationwide instrument of government control, providing support for local leaders and enforcing public morality. They acted as general civil administrators, implementing official policies and thereby facilitating unification and modernization. In rural areas especially, the police had great authority and were accorded the same mixture of fear and respect as the village head. Their increasing involvement in political affairs was one of the foundations of the authoritarian state in Japan in the first half of the twentieth century.

The centralized police system steadily acquired responsibilities, until it controlled almost all aspects of daily life, including fire prevention and mediation of labor disputes. The system regulated public health, business, factories, and construction, and it issued permits and licenses. The Peace Preservation Law of 1925 gave police the authority to arrest people for "wrong thoughts". Special Higher Police were created to regulate the content of motion pictures, political meetings, and election campaigns. Military police operating under the army and navy and the justice and home ministries aided the civilian police in limiting proscribed political activity. After the Manchurian Incident of 1931, military police assumed greater authority, leading to friction with their civilian counterparts. After 1937 police directed business activities for the war effort, mobilized labor, and controlled transportation.

After Japan's surrender in 1945, occupation authorities retained the prewar police structure until a new system was implemented and the Diet passed the 1947 Police Law. Contrary to Japanese proposals for a strong, centralized force to deal with postwar unrest—but in line with the thinking of American police reformers on the same subject—the police system was decentralized. About 1,600 independent municipal forces were established in cities, towns, and villages with 5,000 inhabitants or more, and a National Rural Police was organized by prefecture. Civilian control was to be ensured by placing the police under the jurisdiction of public safety commissions controlled by the National Public Safety Commission in the Office of the Prime Minister. The Home Ministry was abolished and replaced by the less powerful Ministry of Home Affairs, and the police were stripped of their responsibility for fire protection, public health, and other administrative duties.

When most of the occupation forces were transferred to Korea in 1950–51, the 75,000 strong National Police Reserve was formed to back up the ordinary police during civil disturbances, and pressure mounted for a centralized system more compatible with Japanese political preferences. The 1947 Police Law was amended in 1951 to allow the municipal police of smaller communities to merge with the National Rural Police. Most chose this arrangement, and by 1954 only about 400 cities, towns, and villages still had their own police forces. Under the 1954 amended Police Law, a final restructuring created an even more centralized system in which local forces were organized by prefectures under a National Police Agency.

The revised Police Law of 1954, still in effect in the 1990s, preserves some strong points of the postwar system, particularly measures ensuring civilian control and political neutrality, while allowing for increased centralization. The National Public Safety Commission system has been retained. State responsibility for maintaining public order has been clarified to include coordination of national and local efforts; centralization of police information, communications, and record keeping facilities; and national standards for training, uniforms, pay, rank, and promotion. Rural and municipal forces were abolished and integrated into prefectural forces, which handled basic police matters. Officials and inspectors in various ministries and agencies continue to exercise special police functions assigned to them in the 1947 Police Law.

== See also ==
- Public safety
