= Minoru Yanagida =

Japanese politician

- 柳田 稔
- Official portrait, 2010

Minister of Justice
- In office 17 September 2010 – 22 November 2010
- Prime Minister: Naoto Kan
- Preceded by: Keiko Chiba
- Succeeded by: Yoshito Sengoku

Member of the House of Councillors
- In office 26 July 1998 – 25 July 2022
- Preceded by: Kimiko Kurihara
- Succeeded by: Eri Mikami
- Constituency: Hiroshima at-large

Member of the House of Representatives
- In office 19 February 1990 – 27 September 1996
- Preceded by: Masakatsu Okada
- Succeeded by: Constituency abolished
- Constituency: Hiroshima 3rd

Personal details
- Born: 6 November 1954 (age 71) Kagoshima City, Kagoshima, Japan
- Party: Independent (1998–2004; 2020–present)
- Other political affiliations: DSP (1990–1994); NFP (1994–1998); DPJ (2004–2016); DP (2016–2018); DPP (2018–2020)
- Education: University of Tokyo

Minoru Yanagida (柳田 稔, Yanagida Minoru; born 6 November 1954) is a former Japanese politician of the Democratic Party For the People who served as member of the House of Councillors in the Diet (national legislature). A native of Kagoshima, Kagoshima and graduate of the University of Tokyo, he was elected to the House of Councillors for the first time in 1998 after serving in the House of Representatives for two terms since 1990.

Political offices
Preceded by Keiko Chiba	Minister of Justice; 17 September – 22 November 2010	Succeeded by Yoshito Sengoku
