= Kuniaki =

- Gender: Male

Origin
- Origin: Japanese
- Meaning: Different meanings depending on the kanji used

Kuniaki (written: 邦明, 邦昭, 国明 or 國昭) is a masculine Japanese given name. Notable people with the name include:

- Kuniaki Asomura (阿曽村 邦昭), Japanese diplomat
- Kuniaki Haishima (蓜島 邦明), Japanese musician and composer
- Kuniaki Kobayashi (小林 邦昭; born 1956), Japanese professional wrestler
- Kuniaki Koiso (小磯 國昭; 1880–1950), Japanese general and Prime Minister of Japan
- Kuniaki Shibata (柴田 国明; born 1947), Japanese boxer
- Kuniaki Takahashi (高橋 邦明; born 1972), Japanese drifting driver
