= Katsunosuke =

- Gender: Male

Origin
- Origin: Japanese
- Meaning: Different meanings depending on the kanji used

Katsunosuke (written: 勝之祐 or 勝之助) is a masculine Japanese given name. Notable people with the name include:

- Katsunosuke Hori (堀 勝之祐; born 1941), Japanese voice actor and actor
- Katsunosuke Inoue (井上 勝之助; 1861–1929), Japanese diplomat
