= Chikahito Harada =

Japanese diplomat

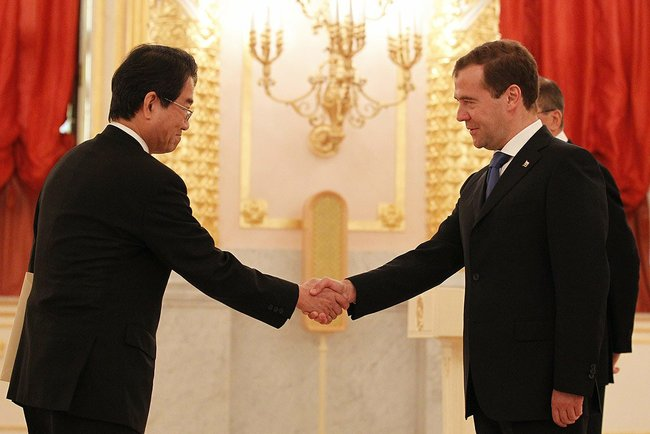
Ambassador of Japan Tikahito Harada presents his letter of credence.

Chikahito Harada (原田 親仁, Harada Chikahito, born April 21, 1951) is a Japanese diplomat and former Ambassador to the Russian Federation.

In 1999-2001 served as Press Secretary in the Japanese Ministry of Foreign Affairs. In 2001-2002 served as representative of Japan to the North Pacific Anadromous Fish Commission. Served also as Charge d'Affaire at the Japanese Embassy in China and director of the Russia Division at the Japanese Ministry of Foreign Affairs.

Harada was the ambassador to the Czech Republic from 2008 to 2010. From 2010 to 2015, he served as the ambassador to the Russian Federation.

== Works ==
- Russia and North-East Asia, Adelphy Papers no. 310, 1997

== See also ==
- List of ambassadors of Japan to Czechoslovakia and the Czech Republic
