= Keinosuke =

- Gender: Male

Origin
- Origin: Japanese
- Meaning: Different meanings depending on the kanji used

Keinosuke (written: 慶之輔 or 啓之助) is a masculine Japanese given name. Notable people with the name include:

- Keinosuke Enoeda (榎枝 慶之輔; 1935–2003), Japanese karateka
- Keinosuke Fujii (藤井 啓之助), Japanese diplomat
