= List of Japanese ministers, envoys and ambassadors to Germany =

The List of Japanese ministers, envoys and ambassadors to Germany started when Sameshima Naonobu presented his credentials to the German government in 1870.

== List ==
This is a chronological list of Japanese diplomats.

Inaugural date	Official position (Japanese)	Official position	Name (Japanese)	Name
October 3, 1870	少弁務使	Chargé d'affaires	鮫島 尚信	Sameshima Naonobu
May 3, 1872	中弁務使	Minister resident	鮫島 尚信	Sameshima Naonobu
October 14, 1872	弁理公使	Minister resident	鮫島 尚信	Sameshima Naonobu
November 22, 1873	特命全権公使	Minister Plenipotentiary	鮫島 尚信	Sameshima Naonobu
August 17, 1874	代理公使	Chargé d'affaires	青木 周蔵	Aoki Shūzō
September 3, 1874	特命全権公使	Minister Plenipotentiary	青木 周蔵	Aoki Shūzō
August 24, 1879	臨時代理公使	Chargé d'affaires ad interim	三宮 義胤	Sannomiya Yoshitane
May 22, 1880	特命全権公使	Minister Plenipotentiary	青木 周蔵	Aoki Shūzō
December 9, 1885	臨時代理公使	Chargé d'affaires ad interim	小松原 英太郎	Komatsubara Eitarō
March 13, 1886	特命全権公使	Minister Plenipotentiary	品川 弥二郎	Shinagawa Yajirō
December 27, 1886	臨時代理公使	Chargé d'affaires ad interim	井上 勝之助	Inoue Katsunosuke
June 4, 1887	特命全権公使	Minister Plenipotentiary	西園寺 公望	Saionji Kinmochi
July 5, 1891	臨時代理公使	Chargé d'affaires ad interim	井上 勝之助	Inoue Katsunosuke
January 27, 1892	特命全権公使	Minister Plenipotentiary	青木 周蔵	Aoki Shūzō
July 23, 1897	臨時代理公使	Chargé d'affaires ad interim	宮岡 恒次郎	Miyaoka Kōjirō
May 19, 1898	特命全権公使	Minister Plenipotentiary	井上 勝之助	Inoue Katsunosuke
January 7, 1906	特命全権大使	Ambassador	井上 勝之助	Inoue Katsunosuke
September 16, 1907	臨時代理大使	Chargé d'affaires ad interim	日置 益	Hioki Eki
August 1, 1908	臨時代理大使	Chargé d'affaires ad interim	船越 光之丞	Funakoshi Mitsunojō
October 5, 1908	特命全権大使	Ambassador	珍田 捨巳	Chinda Sutemi
November 22, 1911	臨時代理大使	Chargé d'affaires ad interim	畑 良太郎	Hata Ryōtarō
December 18, 1911	特命全権大使	Ambassador	杉村 虎一	Sugimura Kōichi
August 22, 1914	臨時代理大使	Chargé d'affaires ad interim	船越 光之丞	Funakoshi Mitsunojō
August 24, 1914	First World War			
March 21, 1920	臨時代理大使	Chargé d'affaires ad interim	出淵 勝次	Debuchi Katsuji
January 7, 1921	特命全権大使	Ambassador	日置 益	Hioki Eki
August 20, 1923	臨時代理大使	Chargé d'affaires ad interim	大野 守衛	Ōno Morie
February 6, 1924	特命全権大使	Ambassador	本多 熊太郎	Honda Kumatarō
September 21, 1925	臨時代理大使	Chargé d'affaires ad interim	伊藤 述史	Itō Nobufumi
August 25, 1926	特命全権大使	Ambassador	長岡 春一	Nagaoka Harukazu
May 6, 1930	臨時代理大使	Chargé d'affaires ad interim	東郷 茂徳	Tōgō Shigenori
April 6, 1931	特命全権大使	Ambassador	小幡 酉吉	Obata Yūkichi
January 16, 1932	臨時代理大使	Chargé d'affaires ad interim	七田 基玄	Shichida Motoharu
November 19, 1932	臨時代理大使	Chargé d'affaires ad interim	東郷 茂徳	Tōgō Shigenori
November 22, 1932	臨時代理大使	Chargé d'affaires ad interim	藤井 啓之助	Fujii Keinosuke
April 3, 1933	特命全権大使	Ambassador	永井 松三	Nagai Matsuzō
October 15, 1934	臨時代理大使	Chargé d'affaires ad interim	杉下 裕次郎	Sugishita Yūjirō
December 28, 1934	特命全権大使	Ambassador	武者小路 公共	Mushakōji Kintomo
July 3, 1935	臨時代理大使	Chargé d'affaires ad interim	井上 庚二郎	Inoue Kōjirō
April 3, 1936	特命全権大使	Ambassador	武者小路 公共	Mushakōji Kintomo
December 12, 1937	臨時代理大使	Chargé d'affaires ad interim	柳井 恒夫	Yanai Hisao
December 24, 1937	特命全権大使	Ambassador	東郷 茂徳	Tōgō Shigenori
October 29, 1938	特命全権大使	Ambassador	大島 浩	Ōshima Hiroshi
October 29, 1939	臨時代理大使	Chargé d'affaires ad interim	宇佐美 珍彦	Usami Uzuhiko
December 4, 1939	特命全権大使	Ambassador	来栖 三郎	Kurusu Saburō
February 17, 1941	特命全権大使	Ambassador	大島 浩	Ōshima Hiroshi
May 8, 1945	Surrender and end of the Third Reich. 1945-1952 no diplomatic relations			
March 15, 1952	在ボン在外事務所長	Direktor des Auslandsbüros in Bonn	寺岡 洪平	Teraoka Kōhei
December 6, 1953	臨時代理大使	Chargé d'affaires ad interim	曾野 明	Sono Akira
January 8, 1954	特命全権大使	Ambassador	加瀬 俊一	Kase Shunichi
June 6, 1956	臨時代理大使	Chargé d'affaires ad interim	曾野 明	Sono Akira
November 27, 1956	特命全権大使	Ambassador	大野 勝巳	Ōno Katsumi
January 9, 1957	臨時代理大使	Chargé d'affaires ad interim	曾野 明	Sono Akira
April 8, 1957	特命全権大使	Ambassador	武内 龍次	Takeuchi Ryūji
December 19, 1960	臨時代理大使	Chargé d'affaires ad interim	竹内 春海	Takeuchi Harumi
April 13, 1961	特命全権大使	Ambassador	成田 勝四郎	Narita Katsushirō
April 11, 1965	臨時代理大使	Chargé d'affaires ad interim	兼松 武	Kanematsu Takeshi
May 20, 1965	特命全権大使	Ambassador	内田 藤雄	Uchida Fujio
January 10, 1970	臨時代理大使	Chargé d'affaires ad interim	吉岡 一郎	Yoshioka Ichirō
March 11, 1970	特命全権大使	Ambassador	甲斐 文比古	Kai Fumihiko
October 10, 1972	臨時代理大使	Chargé d'affaires ad interim	加藤 千幸	Katō Chisachi
October 27, 1972	特命全権大使	Ambassador	曾野 明	Sono Akira
September 5, 1975	臨時代理大使	Chargé d'affaires ad interim	宮沢 泰	Miyazawa Yasushi
October 21, 1975	特命全権大使	Ambassador	上田 常光	Ueda Tsuneaki
December 4, 1977	臨時代理大使	Chargé d'affaires ad interim	茂木 良三	Moteki Ryōzō
February 1, 1978	特命全権大使	Ambassador	吉野 文六	Yoshino Bunroku
March 28, 1982	臨時代理大使	Chargé d'affaires ad interim	山下 新太郎	Yamashita Shintarō
March 30, 1982	特命全権大使	Ambassador	宮崎 弘道	Miyazaki Hiromichi
January 8, 1986	臨時代理大使	Chargé d'affaires ad interim	中村 昭一	Nakamura Shōichi
January 15, 1986	特命全権大使	Ambassador	宮沢 泰	Miyazawa Yasushi
March 31, 1989	臨時代理大使	Chargé d'affaires ad interim	高島 有終	Takashima Yūshū
April 8, 1989	特命全権大使	Ambassador	木村 敬三	Kimura Keizō

In 2013, the head of the Japanese embassy in Berlin is Nakane Takeshi.

In 2024 the head of the Japanese Embassy in Berlin (Japan’s Ambassador to Germany) is Shino Mitsuko (志野 光子) and is the first woman to hold this post for Japan in Germany and the EU.

== See also ==
- List of German ministers, envoys and ambassadors to Japan
- Japanese people in Germany
- Germany–Japan relations
- Diplomatic rank
