= Matsuzo Nagai =

Japanese politician

- 永井 松三
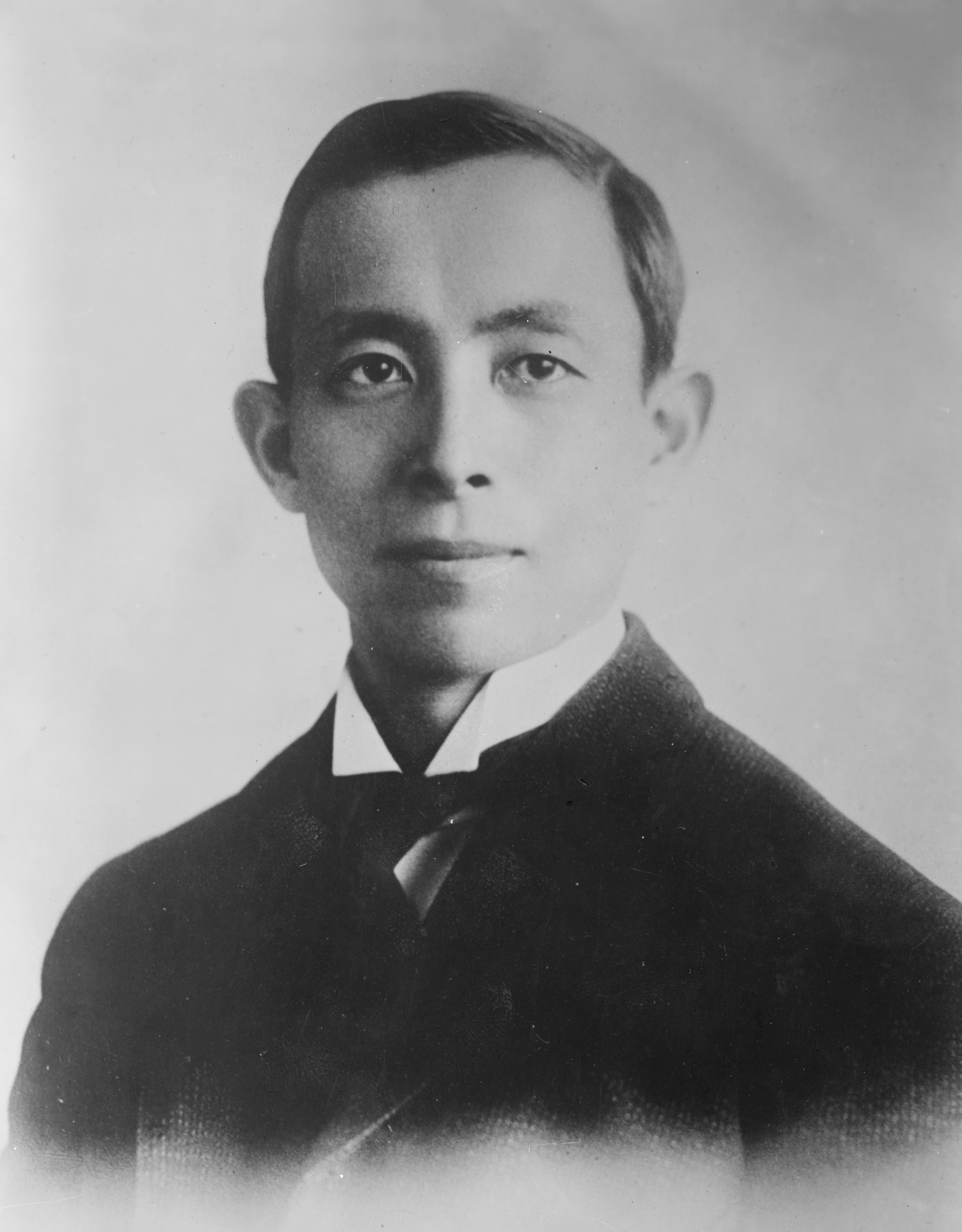
- Nagai in 1917

Member of the House of Peers
- In office 5 February 1946 – 2 May 1947 Nominated by the Emperor

Personal details
- Born: 5 March 1877 Nagoya, Aichi, Japan
- Died: 19 April 1957 (aged 80)

Matsuzo Nagai (永井 松三, Nagai Matsuzō; 5 March 1877 – 19 April 1957) was a Japanese diplomat and Olympic Games activist.

== Biography ==
He was born on 5 March 1877 in Aichi Prefecture.

He served in the Japanese delegation to the League of Nations in 1920, and served as Japanese Ambassador to Sweden and Finland in 1925–1930. In 1930, he formed part of the Japanese delegation to the London Naval Conference. He served as Ambassador to Germany from April 1933 to October 1934. After this, since at least mid-1935, he was the Japanese Ambassador to Latvia.

In 1936, he served as Minister of Transportation, and was an active supporter of naval expansion plans. In 1937, he was active in the Japanese governmental committee which was charged with preparing the Olympic games scheduled to take place in Tokyo in 1940, which was eventually cancelled. He also served as a member of the International Olympic Committee in 1939–1950.

He received the Grand Cross of the Royal Swedish Order of the Polar Star in 1928 and the Latvian Order of the Three Stars 1st Class on 5 July 1935. He died on 19 April 1957.

== See also ==
- List of Ambassadors of Japan to Finland
- List of Japanese ministers, envoys and ambassadors to Germany

Diplomatic posts
Preceded by Chōzō Koike	Japanese Consul-General at San Francisco; 1912–1913	Succeeded by Masanao Hanihara
Preceded by Ryōtarō Hata	Japanese Ambassador to Denmark; 1924–1928	Succeeded by Kintomo Mushanokōji
Preceded by Ryōtarō Hata	Japanese Ambassador to Norway; 1924–1928	Succeeded by Kintomo Mushanokōji
Preceded by Ryōtarō Hata	Japanese Ambassador to Sweden; 1924–1928	Succeeded by Kintomo Mushanokōji
Preceded by Mineichirō Adachi	Japanese Ambassador to Belgium; 1928–1930	Succeeded by Naotake Satō
Preceded by Yūkichi Obata	Japanese Ambassador to Germany; 1933–1935	Succeeded by Kintomo Mushanokōji
Preceded by unknown	Japanese Ambassador to Latvia; 1935–1936	Succeeded by unknown
