= Masanao Hanihara =

Japanese diplomat

- 埴原 正直
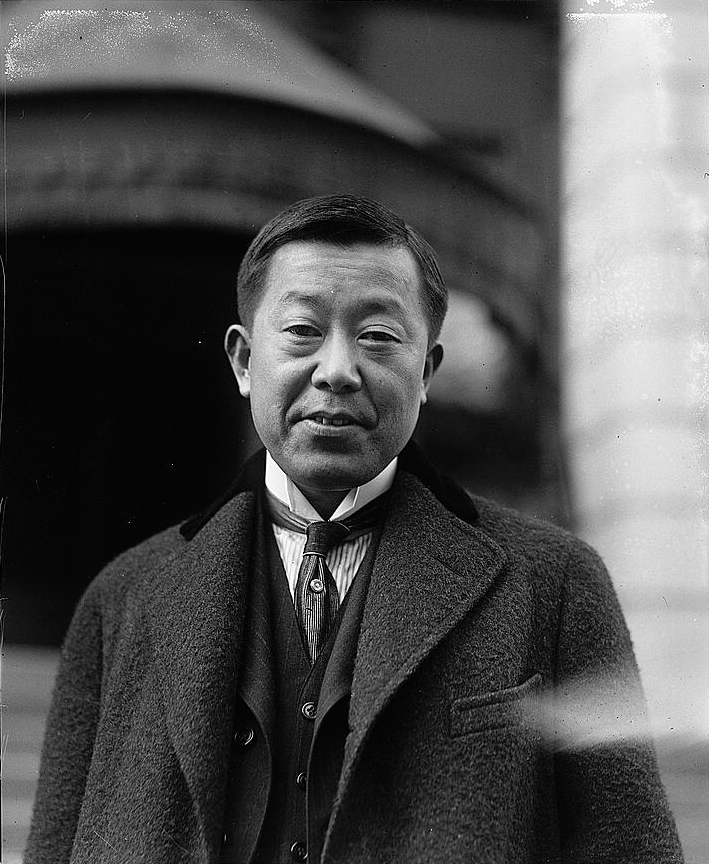
- Masanao Hanihara in 1921

Personal details
- Born: August 25, 1876 Minamoto-mura, Yamanashi Prefecture
- Died: December 20, 1934 (aged 58)
- Education: Tokyo Professional School

Masanao Hanihara (埴原 正直, Hanihara Masanao; August 25, 1876 – December 20, 1934) was a Japanese diplomat.

== Biography ==
He was born on August 25, 1876 in Minamoto-mura, Yamanashi Prefecture (modern-day Minami-Alps). He attended the Tokyo Professional School (now Waseda University).

He came to the United States in 1902 as a member of the Japanese Embassy at Washington, D.C., was consul general at San Francisco in 1916–18, then returned to Japan as director of the Bureau of Commerce of the Japanese Foreign Office. He was a member of the Ishii Mission from which came the Lansing–Ishii Agreement. He was also an influential member of the Washington Disarmament Conference. In December 1922, he was appointed ambassador to the United States, and arrived in Washington in February 1923.

In April 1924, Hanihara protested the proposed Immigration Act of 1924 by the United States government because it would bar the admission of Japanese to the country. To express the Japanese government's opposition, he wrote a note to U.S. Secretary of State Charles Evans Hughes containing the phrase "grave consequences" which was interpreted as "a veiled threat" implying war by the Senate, and had quite an opposite effect from that intended. He attempted to explain in a second note that his use of that phrase was not intended as a threat, but it did not sway attitudes and the bill was passed without amendments.

The relevant sections of the note was as follows:

the manifest object of the [section barring Japanese immigrants] is to single out Japanese as a nation, stigmatizing them as unworthy and undesirable in the eyes of the American people. And yet the actual result of that particular provision, if the proposed bill becomes law as intended, would be only to exclude 146 Japanese per year.... I realize, as I believe you do, the grave consequences which the enactment of the measure retaining that particular provision would inevitably bring upon the otherwise happy and mutually advantageous relations between our two countries.

It is uncertain who specifically was responsible for the strong wording that the Senate found so disagreeable, with some claiming John V. A MacMurray wrote the note for Hanihara to submit despite Hanihara believing it was too strong. Others, including MacMurray himself, claim they had nothing to do with the writing of the note and that it was entirely Hanihara's doing. Yet another, Eugene Dooman, claims to have found a draft written by Hanihara which had been edited by MacMurray and Hughes.

After the passage of the bill, It was rumored that Hanihara was to be recalled by the Japanese government. Although this was denied, it was soon announced that he would visit Tokyo on leave of absence. Hanihara returned to Japan in 1924 and resigned his Government post in 1927. He died at the age of 58 in 1934 in Tokyo after a series of apoplectic strokes.

Diplomatic posts
Preceded by Matsuzo Nagai	Japanese Consul-General at San Francisco; 1916–1918	Succeeded by Tamekichi Ōta
Preceded by Kijūrō Shidehara	Japanese Ambassador to the United States; 1922–1924	Succeeded by Tsuneo Matsudaira
