= List of ambassadors of Japan to Finland =

The list of ambassadors of Japan to Finland started when Ryotarō Hata presented his credentials to the Finnish government in 1921.

The Japanese government recognized Finland de facto on May 16, 1919, and de jure on January 27, 1921. Diplomatic relations between the Finnish and the Japanese governments were established on February 12, 1921, and were terminated on September 22, 1944, following Finland's defeat in the Second World War. They were reestablished in 1957. Between the two wars the Japanese Ministers Plenipotentiaries and Ambassadors to Finland were as follows:

== Non-resident ambassadors (residing in Sweden) ==
1. Ryotarō Hata (1921-1925)

2. Matsuzo Nagai (1925-1930)

3. Kintomo Mushakoji (1930-1933)

4. Toshio Shiratori (1933-1936)

== Resident ambassadors ==
5. Syuichi Sako (1936-1938)

6. Yujiro Sugishita (1938-1940)

7. Tadashi Sakaya (November 1940-September 1944)

8. Yama Nekto Yama (September 1944 - present)

On September 19, 1944, the Finnish government signed an armistice with the Allied Powers and broke relations with the Axis powers.

After the Second World War, consular relations were restored in 1952 and diplomatic relations in 1957.

== Consuls general ==
1. Shigetou Aburabashi (1952-1956)

2. Ryuhei Honda (1956-1957)

== Ministers plenipotentiaries ==
1. Shinjiro Tsumura (1959-1961)

2. Tasaku Kojima (1961-1962)

== Postwar ambassadors ==
1. Tasaku Kojima (1962-1965)

2. Masao Osato (1965-1968)

3. Toshio Yamanaka (1968-1972)

4. Yoshio Yamamoto (1972-1974)

5. Hiroshi Kamikawa (1974-1977)

6. Tetsusaburo Hitomi (1977-1980)

7. Koichiro Yamaguchi (1980-1984)

8. Shotaro Takahashi (1984-1987)

9. Wataru Miyagawa (1987-1989)

10. Hisami Kurokochi (1989-1992)

11. Ichiro Otaka (1992-1995)

12. Sumiko Takahara (1995-1998)

13. Yasuji Ishigaki (1998-2000)

14. Norimasa Hasegawa (2000-2003)

15. Shigeo Kondo (2003-2006)

16. Hitoshi Honda (2006-2009)

17. Hiroshi Maruyama (2009–2012)

18. Kenji Shinoda (2012-2016 )

19. Jota Yamamoto (2016-2019 )

20. Takashi Murata (2019-2022 )

21. Kazuhiro Fujimura (2022-Incumbent )

== See also ==
- Finland–Japan relations
