= List of ambassadors of Japan to Czechoslovakia and the Czech Republic =

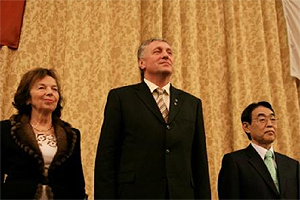
Hideaki Kumazawa, Ambassador of Japan to the Czech Republic, with Livia Klausová, First Lady of the Czech Republic, and Mirek Topolánek, Prime Minister of the Czech Republic (at the Reception to Celebrate the Emperor's Birthday on December 4, 2007)

The list of ambassadors of Japan to Czechoslovakia and the Czech Republic started when Harukazu Nagaoka presented his credentials to the Czechoslovak government in 1921.

Diplomatic relations between the Czechoslovak and the Japanese governments were established in 1920 and again in 1957. Between the two wars the Japanese Ministers Plenipotentiaries and Ambassadors to Czechoslovakia were as follows:

== Ministers plenipotentiaries ==
1. Harukazu Nagaoka, from November 29, 1921

2. Giro Kikuchi, from January 28, 1925. Signed a treaty of commerce between the Czechoslovak and Japanese governments on October 30, 1925.

== Ambassadors ==
1. Eiichi Kimura, from May 30, 1928

2. Masaaki Hotta, from June 18, 1931

3. Keinosuke Fujii, from March 23, 1937

On March 16, 1939, upon the German occupation of Czechoslovakia, the Japanese government withdrew recognition of the Czechoslovak government. On December 9, 1941, the Czechoslovak government in exile declared war on the Japanese Empire.

After the Second World War, diplomatic relations were reestablished on February 13, 1957.

4. Shiroshichi Kimura, from October 30, 1957

5. Kijiro Miyake, from October 19, 1961

6. Taro Tokunaga, from September 23, 1965

7. Takeo Ozawa, from May 14, 1968

8. Takeshi Kanematsu, from April 5, 1971

9. Saburo Kimoto, from November 21, 1972

10. Humihiko Suzuki, from March 20, 1976

11. Ichiro Yoshioka, from April 9, 1980

12. Tadashi Otaka, from March 14, 1983

13. Haruyuki Mabuchi, from March 7, 1987

14. Chisachi Kato, from April 17, 1989 (on April 1, 1991, Embassy title changed from "Embassy of Japan in Czechoslovakia" to "Embassy of Japan in the Czech and Slovak Republics"

15. Kuniaki Asomura, from October 10, 1991 (last Japanese Ambassador to Czachoslovakia. Following the dissolution of Czechoslovakia into the Czech Republic and Slovakia, Embassy was designated from April 1, 1993, as "Embassy of Japan in the Czech Republic")

== Japanese ambassadors to the Czech Republic since 1993 ==
1. Kuniaki Asomura, from April 1, 1993

2. Nobuo Miyamoto, from October 4, 1994

3. Shunji Maruyama, from April 2, 1997

4. Hiroto Ishida, from December 27, 1999

5. Koichi Takahashi, from February 3, 2003

6. Hideaki Kumazawa, from April 21, 2005

7. Chikahito Harada, from October 10, 2008

8. Toshio Kunikata, from March 2011

9. Tetsuo Yamakawa, from 2013

== Sources ==
- Web-page of the Japanese Embassy in Czech Republic (in Czech)
