= Hiroshi Maruyama =

Japanese diplomat

- 丸山 博

Personal details
- Born: 1949 (age 76–77)
- Education: University of Tokyo
- Occupation: Diplomat

Hiroshi Maruyama (丸山 博, Maruyama Hiroshi; born 1949) is a Japanese diplomat who served as Japanese Ambassador to Estonia and Finland from 2009 to 2012.

He studied economics at the University of Tokyo.

He entered the Japanese Ministry of Transport in 1972, and served as director of the Public Relations Office, the Aviation Industries Division and the Road Transport Bureau. From 2005 to 2009 he served as Vice-Minister of Land, Infrastructure and Transport.

== See also ==
- List of Ambassadors of Japan to Finland
