= Toshio Shiratori =

Japanese politician, war criminal 1887-1949

- 白鳥 敏夫
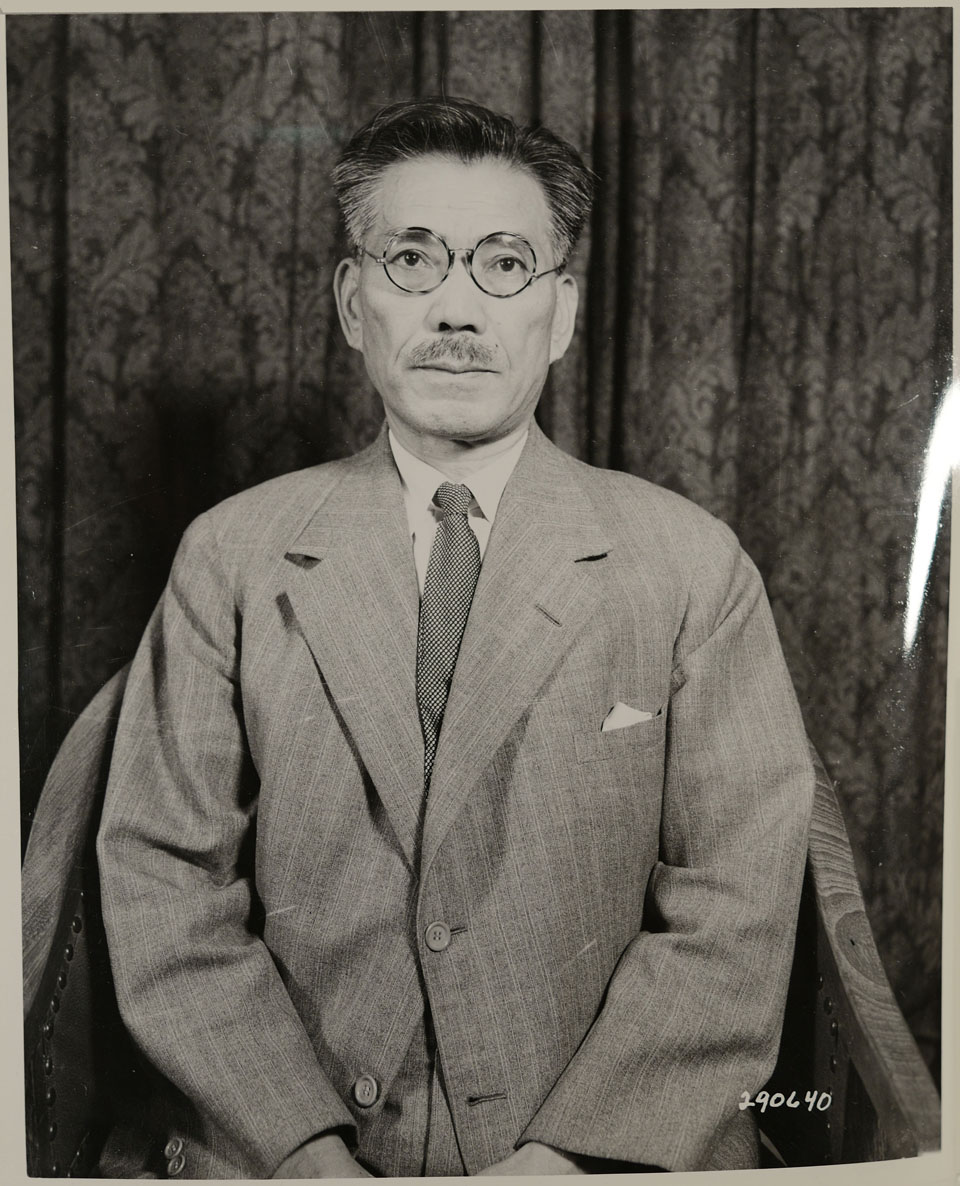
- Shiratori in 1947

Member of the House of Representatives
- In office 30 April 1942 – 5 December 1945
- Preceded by: Ikeda Seishū
- Succeeded by: Constituency abolished
- Constituency: Chiba 3rd

Personal details
- Born: 8 June 1887 Chōsei, Chiba, Japan
- Died: 3 June 1949 (aged 61) Sugamo Prison, Tokyo, Japan
- Party: Imperial Rule Assistance Association
- Education: First Higher School
- Alma mater: Tokyo Imperial University
- Occupation: Ambassador, Adviser to foreign minister
- Criminal information
- Criminal information
- Status: Deceased
- Conviction: Crimes against peace
- Trial: International Military Tribunal for the Far East
- Penalty: Life imprisonment

Toshio Shiratori (白鳥 敏夫, Shiratori Toshio; 8 June 1887 – 3 June 1949) was a Japanese politician who served as the ambassador to Italy (then under Fascist rule) from 1938 to 1940, adviser to the Japanese foreign minister in 1940, and one of the 14 Class-A war criminals enshrined at Yasukuni Shrine.

Shiratori served as Director of Information Bureau under the Foreign Ministry from 1929 to 1933. He served as Ambassador to Sweden and non-resident Ambassador to Finland from 1933 to 1936, the Grand Cross of the Royal Swedish Order of the Polar Star granted to him in 1939. He was appointed ambassador to Italy, serving from 1938 to 1940, and became adviser to foreign minister Yōsuke Matsuoka in 1940. He was an advocate of military expansionism, counseling an alliance between Germany, Italy, and Japan to facilitate world domination. On 23 May 1942, the Italian Foreign Minister Count Galeazzo Ciano wrote in his diary that Shiratori had said that the 'dominion of the world belongs to Japan, the Mikado is the only god on earth, and that both Hitler and Mussolini must become resigned to this reality.'

Shiratori was found guilty of conspiring to wage aggressive war by the International Military Tribunal for the Far East in November 1948 and sentenced to life imprisonment. He died in prison of laryngeal cancer in 1949.

On 7 October 1978, Shiratori was one of fourteen Class-A war criminals controversially enshrined at Yasukuni Shrine. A memo from Emperor Shōwa, disclosed in 2006, revealed that he stopped visiting Yasukuni Shrine from 1978 until his death in 1989, because "they even enshrined Matsuoka and Shiratori."

== See also ==
- List of Ambassadors of Japan to Finland
