= Shun'ichi Kase =

Japanese diplomat (1897–1956)

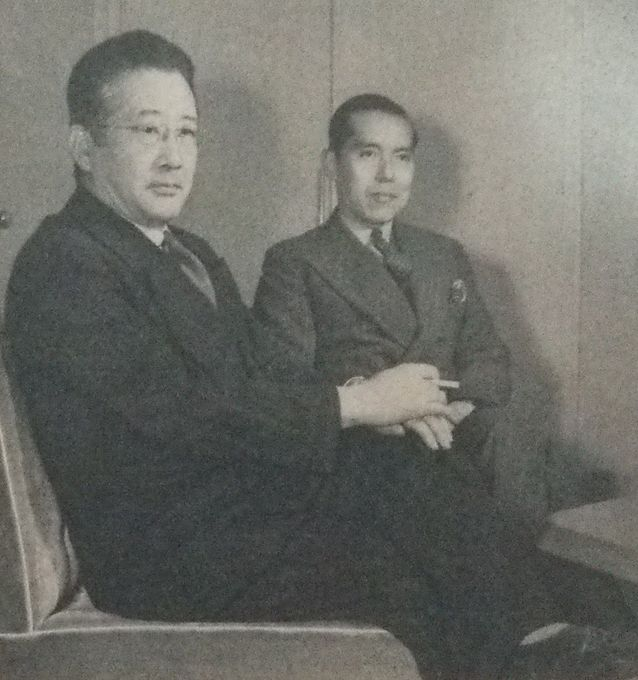
Kase Shun'ichi and Toshikazu

Shun'ichi Kase (加瀬 俊一, Kase Shun'ichi, October 23, 1897– September 9, 1956) was a Japanese diplomat both during and after World War II.

Shun'ichi Kase was a secretary to Japanese Foreign Minister Yōsuke Matsuoka in 1941. Then he was chargé d’affaires in Italy, as of 1943. Subsequently, he served as Japanese Ambassador to Switzerland (in 1945), Japanese Ambassador to Mexico (in 1952), and Japanese Ambassador to West Germany (1953-1956).

The names Shun'ichi Kase and Toshikazu Kase are spelled in Japanese using the same characters, but are two different people. Toshikazu was a bureau chief in the foreign office in Tokyo who also served as secretary to several foreign ministers.

== Role in final days of World War II ==
While serving as Japan's ambassador to Switzerland, Kase advised his government about the Potsdam Declaration which demanded the surrender of Japan. On July 27, 1945, he observed that unconditional surrender applied only to the military and not to the government or the people, and he pleaded that it should be understood that the careful language of Potsdam appeared "to have occasioned a great deal of thought" on the part of the signatory governments—"they seem to have taken pains to save face for us on various points." Nevertheless, Japan rejected the Potsdam Declaration, and soon thereafter atomic bombs fell on Hiroshima and Nagasaki, while the Soviet Union joined the war against Japan. On August 10, 1945, at the behest of Emperor Hirohito, the Japanese government announced its acceptance of the Potsdam terms, provided that the Emperor would remain in place. The announcement of the decision was dispatched to the United States and China through Kase. Great Britain and the Soviet Union were notified through Japan's ambassador to Sweden.

That position still fell short of the U.S. "unconditional surrender" demand, retaining the sticking point that had held up the war's conclusion for months. Strong voices within the administration, including Secretary of State James Byrnes, counseled fighting on. At that point, "[Secretary of the Navy James] Forrestal came up with a shrewd and simple solution: Accept the offer and declare that it accomplishes what the Potsdam Declaration demanded. Say that the Emperor and the Japanese government will rule subject to the orders of the Supreme Commander for the Allied Powers. This would imply recognition of the Emperor while tending to neutralize American public passions against the Emperor. Truman liked this. It would be close enough to 'unconditional.'"

== See also ==
- List of Japanese ministers, envoys and ambassadors to Germany
