= Harukazu Nagaoka =

Japanese diplomat and jurist

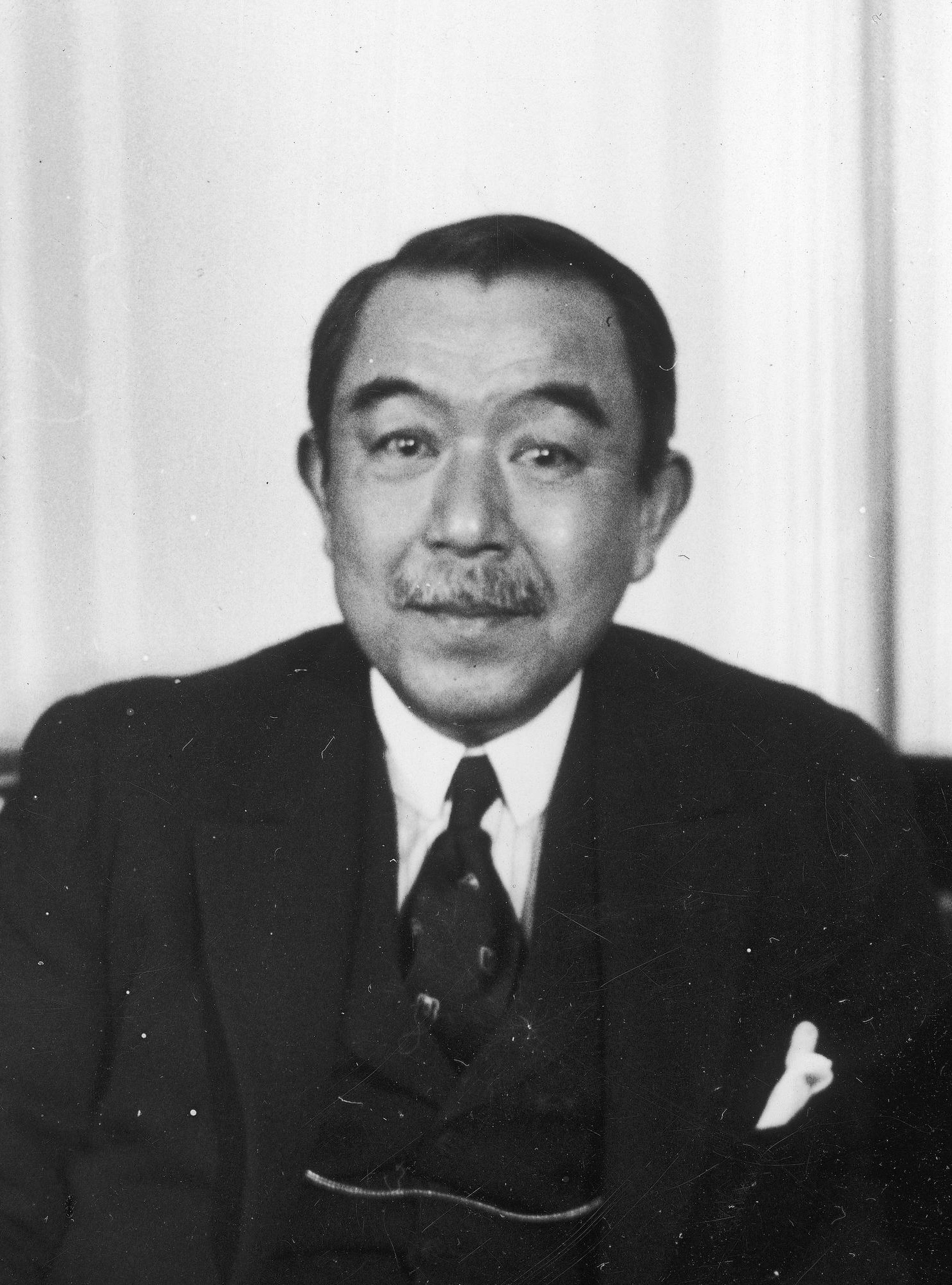
Harukazu Nagaoka

Harukazu Nagaoka (長岡 春一, Nagaoka Harukazu; January 16, 1877 in Kobe, Japan – June 30, 1949) was a Japanese diplomat and jurist who served as member of the Japanese delegation to the Commission of Responsibilities at the Paris Peace Conference and represented Japan to the League of Nations. He also sat on a number of national and international judicial and arbitral positions, including as a judge on the Permanent Court of International Justice.

== Early life and education ==
Nagaoka was born in Kobe, and studied law at the Tokyo Imperial University and the Ecole Sciences Politiques in Paris.

== Legal and diplomatic career ==
Between 1900 and 1902 served as legal counselor for the Japanese Ministry of Foreign Affairs. In 1904-1905 served as secretary of the judge Ichiro Motono in the case of the Japanese tax houses decided at the International Court of Arbitration. In 1907 served as member of the secretariat of the Second Hague Peace Conference. In 1912 served as member of the Japanese delegation at the International Conference for the Unification of the Law Concerning Bills of Exchange. In 1914 served as member of the Japanese Prize Court. In 1917-1921 served as counselor of the Japanese Embassy in Paris. During the Paris Peace Conference in 1919, served as member of the Japanese delegation, as well as member of the Commission of Responsibilities.

On October 17, 1921, the first Japanese Legation was opened in Prague, and Nagaoka became the first envoy. In 1921-1923 served as Japanese Minister Plenipotentiary in Prague, and while in that capacity represented his country at the Lausanne Peace Conference in 1923, which drafted the peace treaty with Turkey. In 1923-1925 served as Minister Plenipotentiary at the Hague. In 1925-1926 served as Director of Treaties and Conventions Division at the Japanese Ministry of Foreign Affairs. In 1926-1930 served as ambassador in Berlin. In 1930 represented his country at the Hague Conference for the Codification of International Law. Served as ambassador in Paris in 1932-1933.

Following the death of Permanent Court of International Justice judge Mineichirō Adachi, he was viewed as best to replace him, and on September 14, 1935, was elected judge at the Permanent Court of International Justice at the Hague. Following the German occupation of the Netherlands in May 1940, the Court ceased to function effectively, and on July 16, its members moved to Bern, Switzerland, where the court officially maintained its headquarters. On February 15, 1942, Nagaoka resigned his position as judge.

== Works ==
- Histoire des relations du Japon avec l'Europe aux XVIe et XVIIe siècles (1905)
- diplomatic memoirs covering the period 1930-1935 (published posthumously)

== See also ==
- List of ambassadors of Japan to Czechoslovakia and the Czech Republic
- List of Japanese ministers, envoys and ambassadors to Germany
