= Finland–Japan relations =

Diplomatic relations between the Republic of Finland and Japan

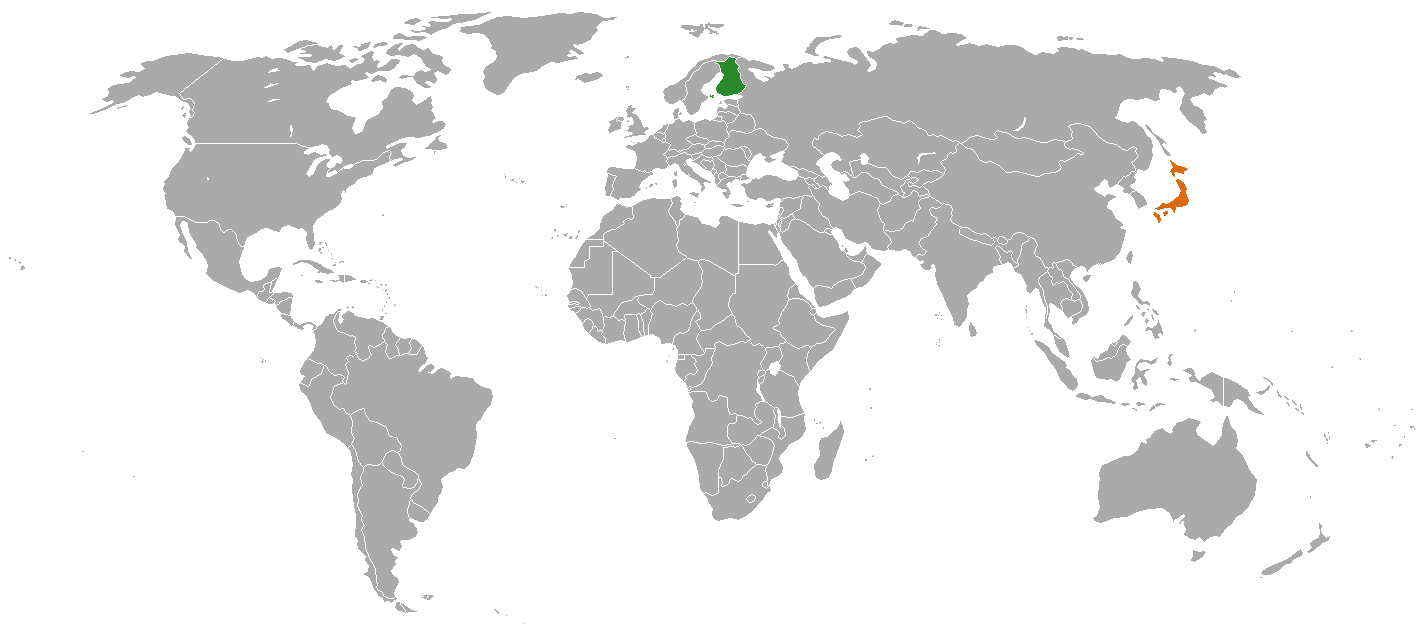
- Finland: Japan

Finland–Japan relations are the bilateral relations between Finland and Japan. Japan first recognized Finland and established diplomatic relations in 1919. Diplomatic relations were temporarily broken in 1944 but were re-established again in 1957. Since then, Finland and Japan have maintained good-natured relations, and have cooperated in places such as science and technology and trade. Both nations share an embassy in the other's capital.

== History ==
While Japan recognised Finland in 1919, relations with Finland date back to 1905, when Japanese intelligence agent Akashi Motojiro attempted to smuggle arms to Finnish nationalists on the SS John Grafton.

After the Finns signed peace with the Soviet Union in 1944, diplomatic relations were severed, because of British pressure. Diplomatic ties were restored in 1957, and with the Japanese embassy opening in 1962.

The first visit of a Finnish state representative to Japan occurred when Foreign Minister Keijo Korhonen visited as an official representative in February 1977. The paved the way for continued relations between the two, with Finnish Prime Minister Kalevi Sorsa visiting in December of the same year.

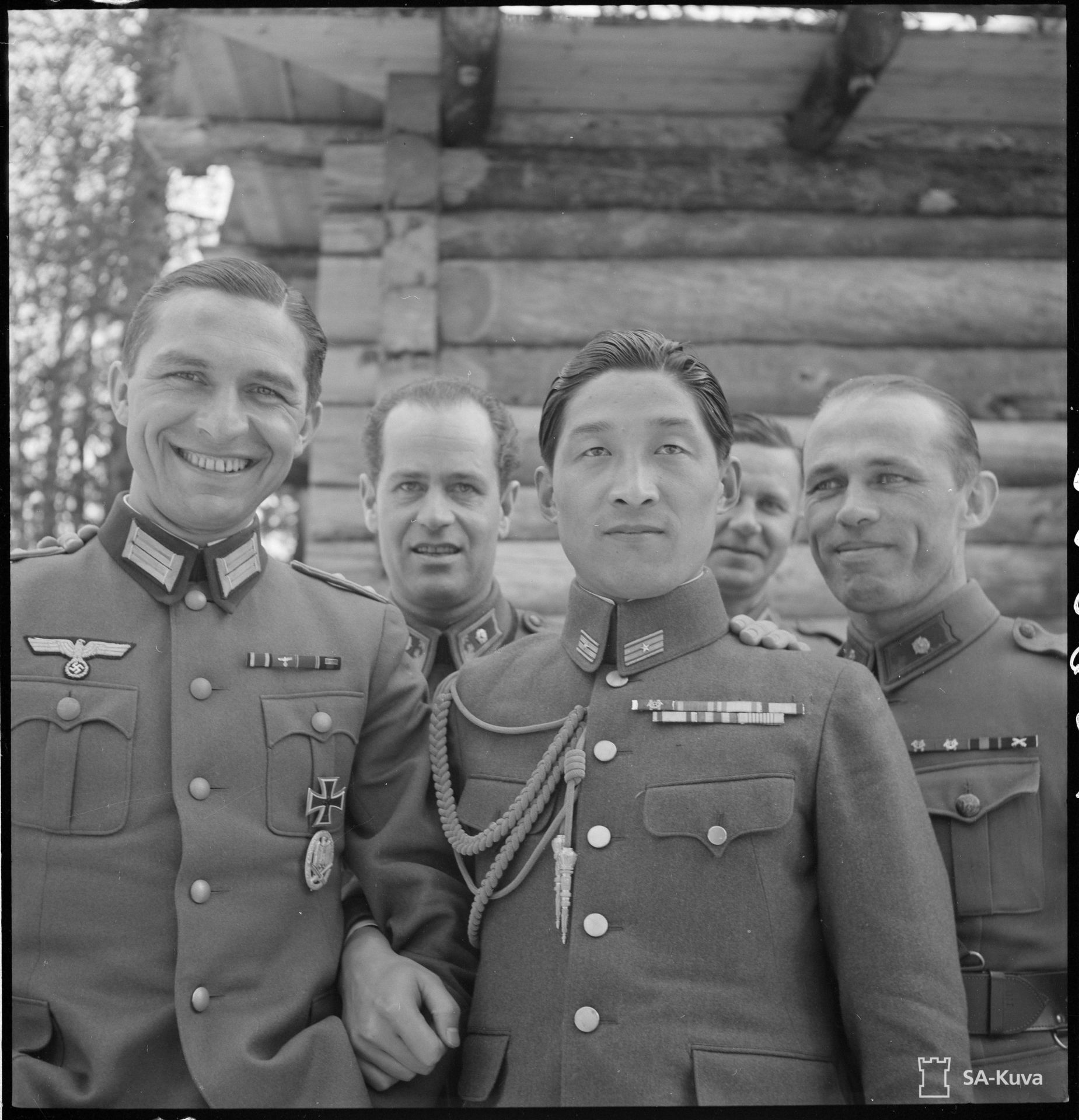
Japanese military visit in 1943

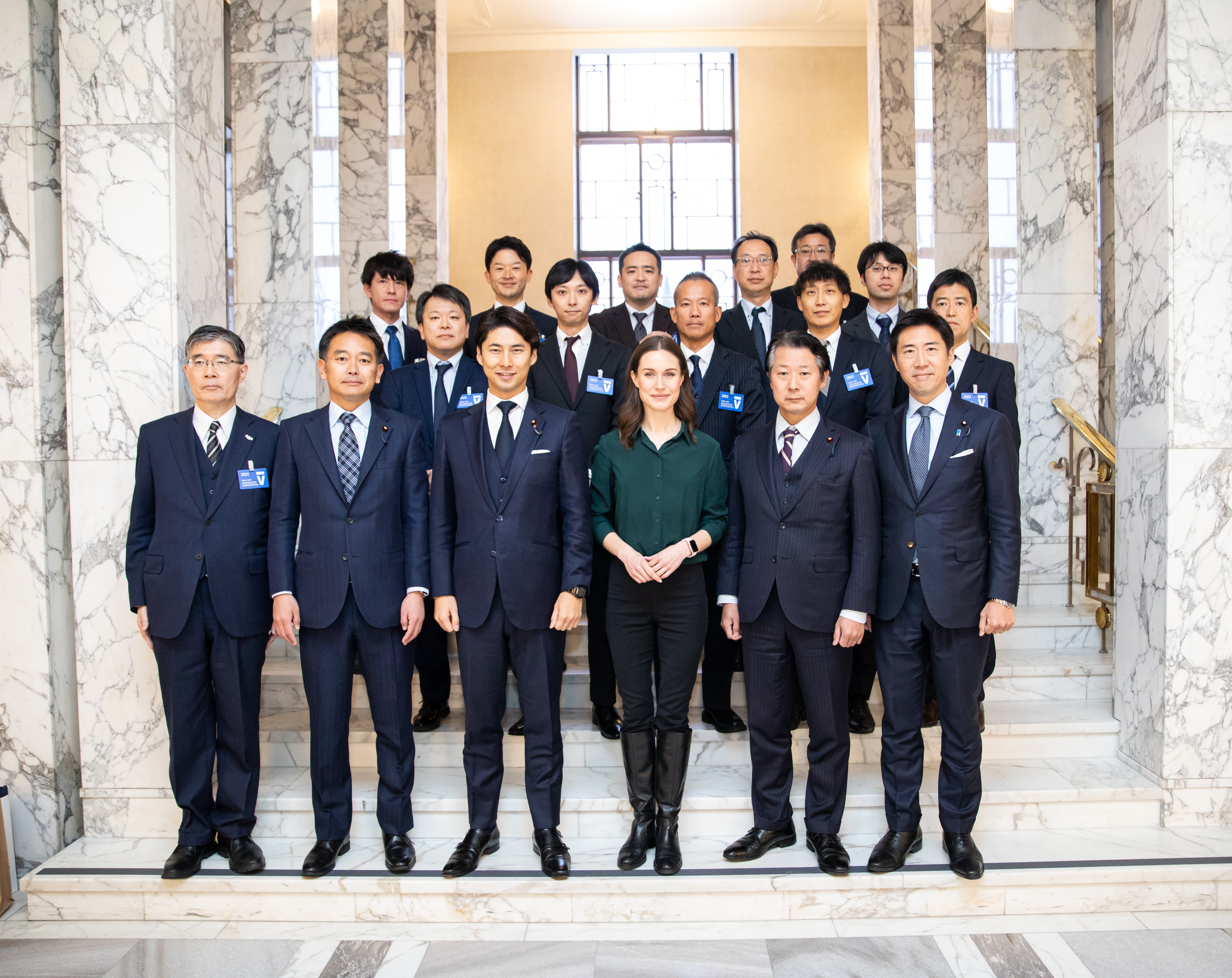
Prime Minister Sanna Marin met with Japanese parliamentarians

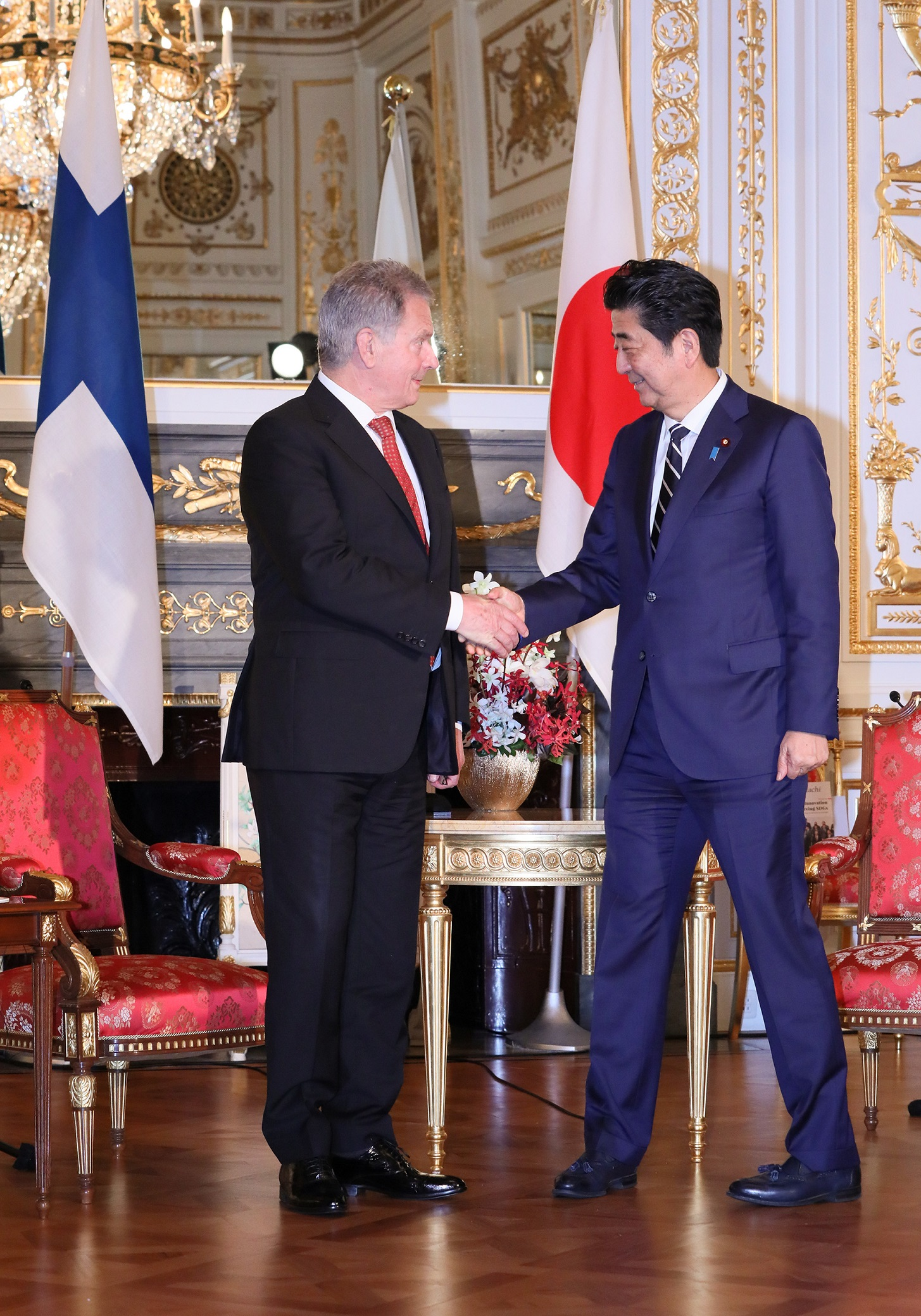
President Sauli Niinistö and prime minister Shinzo Abe

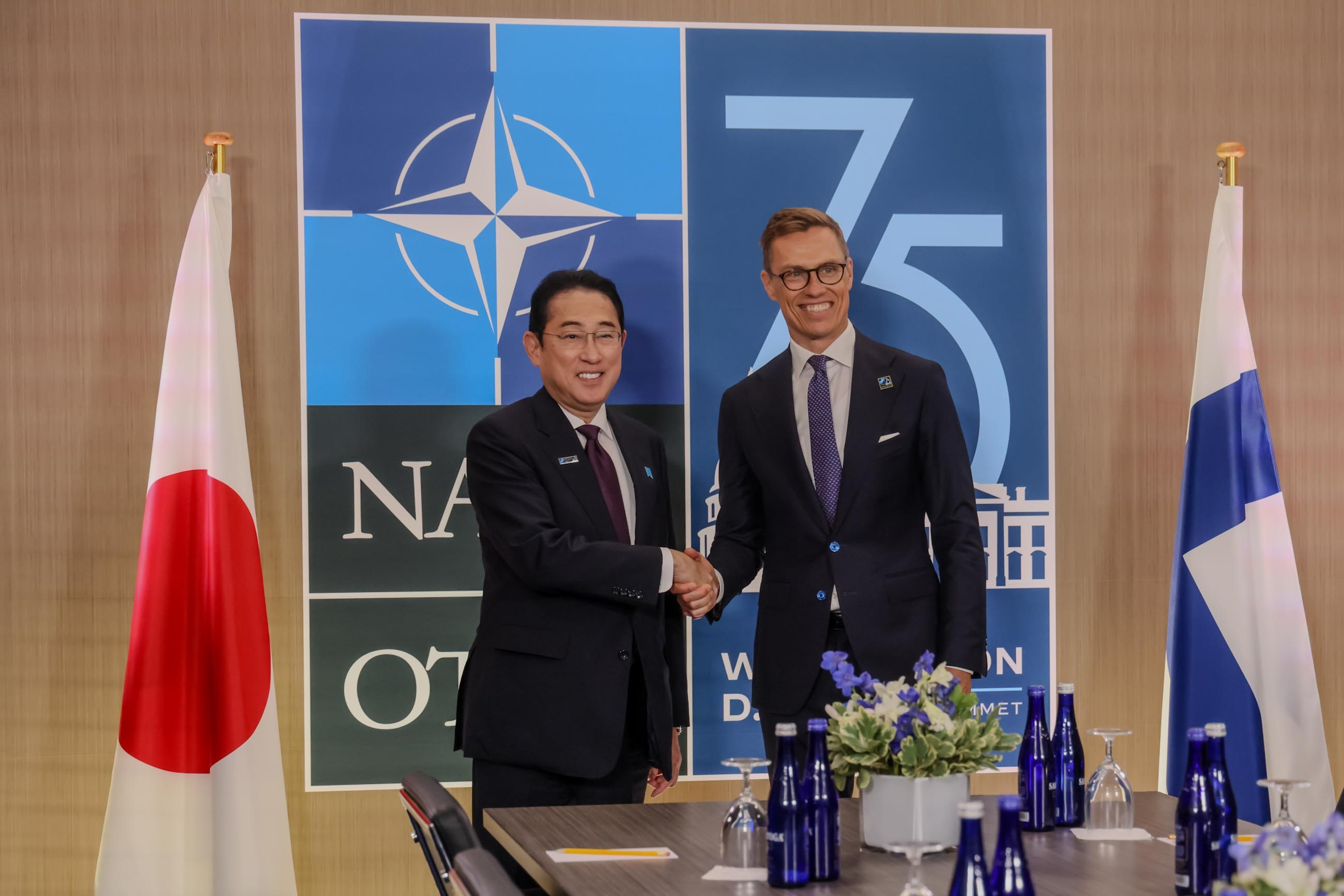
President Alexander Stubb and prime minister Fumio Kishida

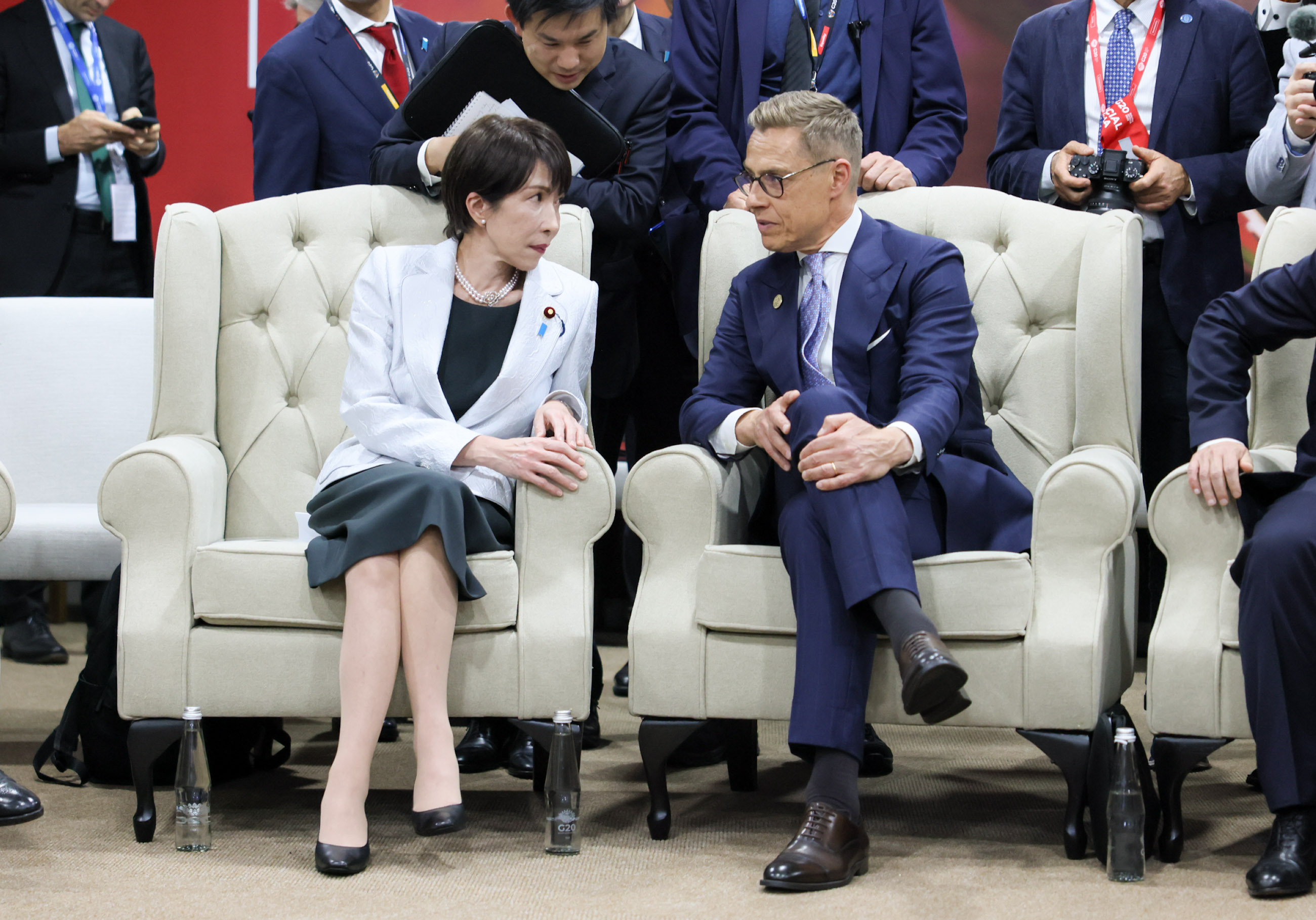
Sanae Takaichi with Alexander Stubb

== State visits ==
In May 2000, Emperor Akihito visited Finland.

President of the Republic of Finland, Sauli Niinistö, visited Japan in 2019 to attend the coronation of His Majesty the Emperor of Japan. Their Imperial Highnesses Crown Prince and Crown Princess Akishino visited Finland in 2019 to celebrate the centenary of the establishment of diplomatic relations between Finland and Japan. President of the Republic of Finland, Alexander Stubb, paid a visit to Japan on 8–12 June 2025.

== Transport ==
In 2013, Japan Airlines started operating direct flights between Tokyo and Helsinki. Finnair operates flights from Helsinki to Tokyo, Osaka and Nagoya.

== Trade ==
Historically, Japan has exported more to Finland than they had imported, however more recently, Finland has begun to export more to Japan than they imported. Notable exports of Finland include timber, cobalt, other crude materials, and manufactured goods, and for Japan, cars and machinery.

== Sport relations ==
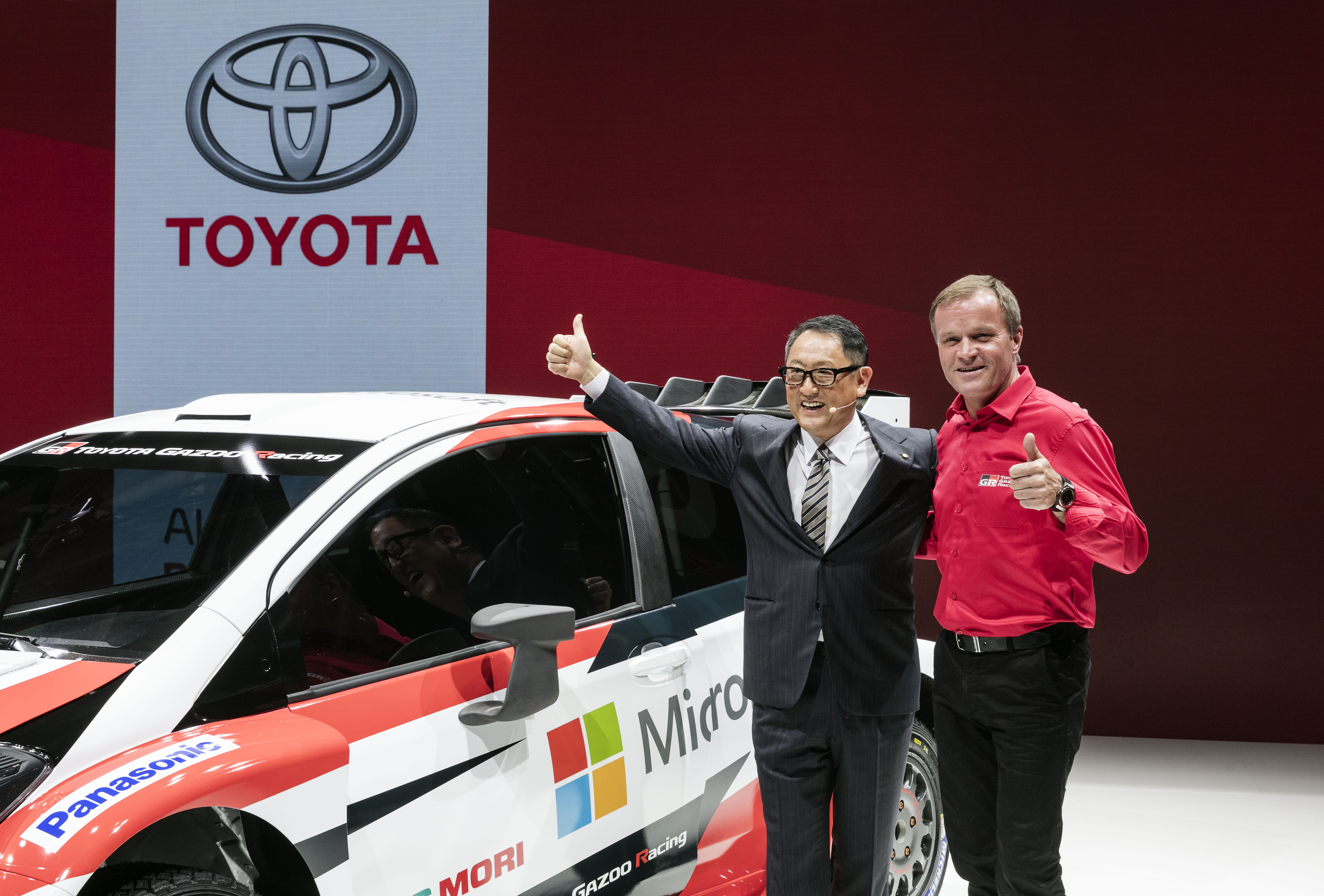
The brand new Toyota Yaris World Rally Car, set to compete in the 2017 WRC season, at the 2016 Paris Motor Show. On the left is Akio Toyoda, CEO of Toyota Motor Corporation, next to four time World Rally Drivers' Champion Tommi Mäkinen

Toyota Gazoo Racing WRT is a Japanese World Rally Championship factory which based in Finland, it serving as the entry for the car manufacturer Toyota.

== Cultural relations ==
The Finnish Moomin series has also been highly popular in Japan, particularly the 1990 TV adaptation. Moomin (1969 TV series) and New Moomin have only been released in Japan.

== Diplomatic missions ==
The Embassy of Japan is located in Helsinki. The Embassy of Finland is located in Tokyo.

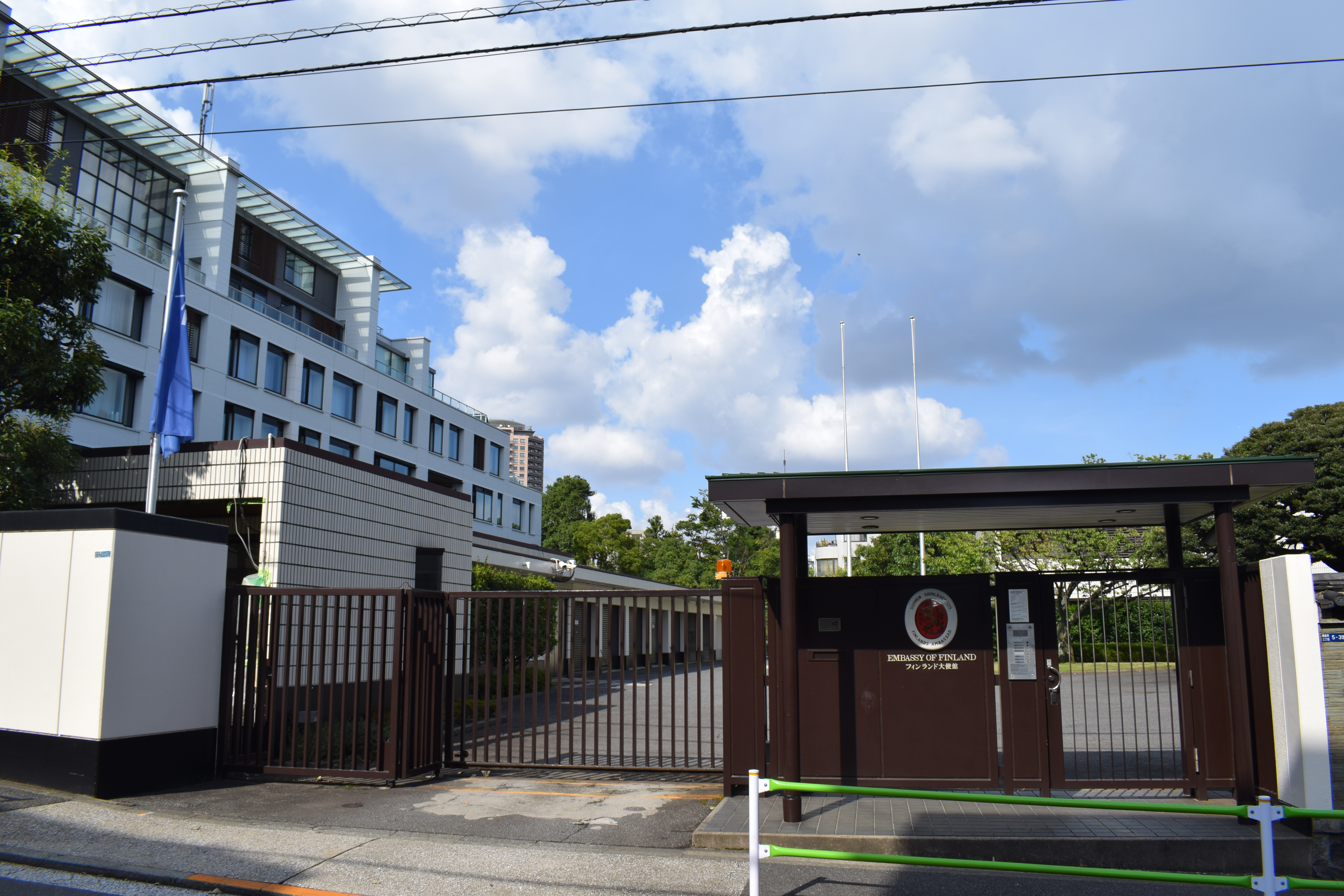
Embassy of Finland in Tokyo

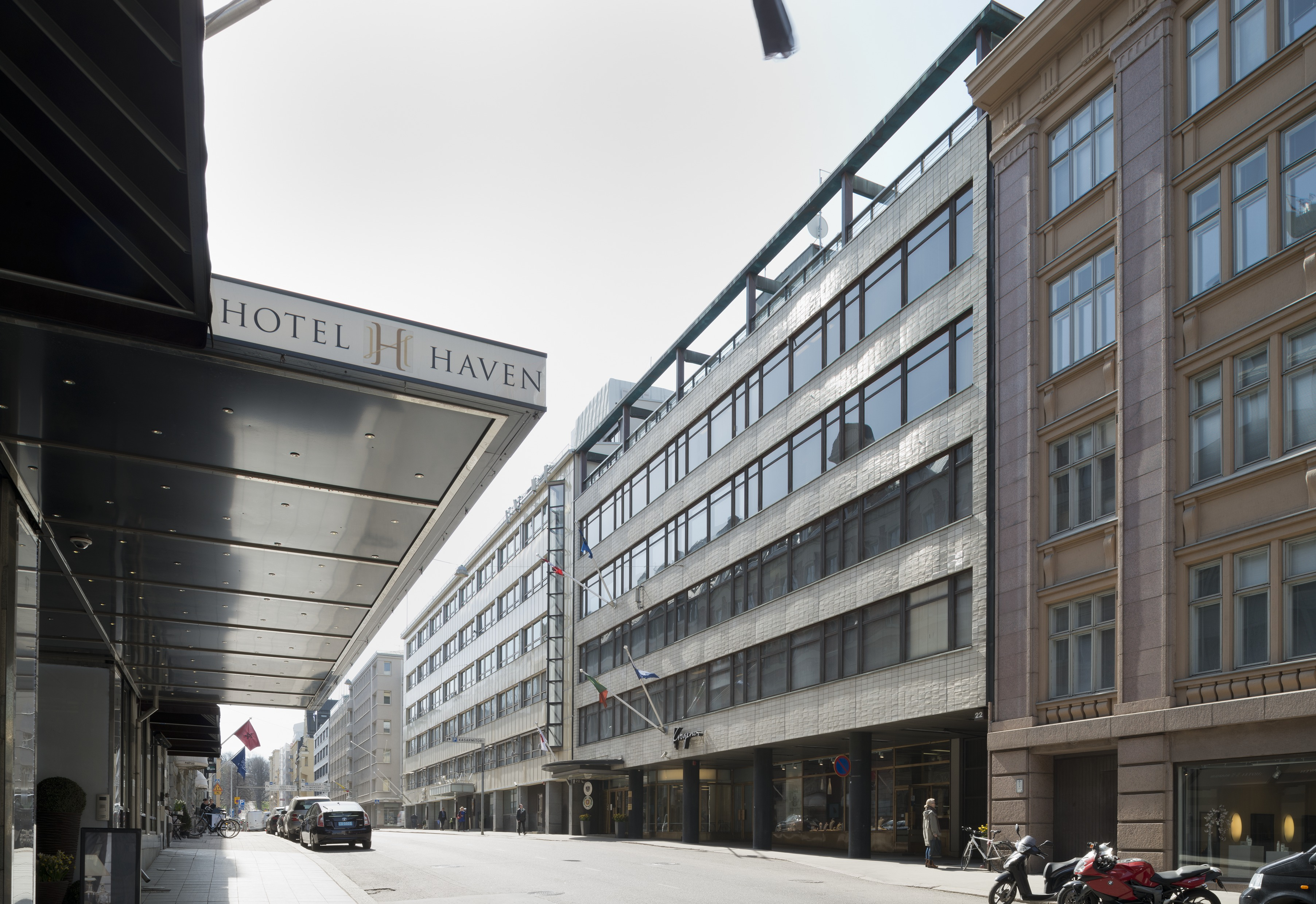
Embassy of Japan in Helsinki

== See also ==
- Foreign relations of Finland
- Foreign relations of Japan
- List of ambassadors of Japan to Finland
