= Shiroshichi Kimura =

Japanese diplomat

Shiroshichi Kimura (木村 四郎七, Kimura Shiroshichi) (b. Oct. 24, 1902 - d. Aug. 28, 1996) was a Japanese diplomat.

Served as Japanese Consul in Hong Kong in May–June 1941. In November 1951, arrived at Taiwan as Chief of the Japanese Government Overseas Office, as diplomatic relations were not established yet. In 1952, took part in peace negotiations with the government of China on Taiwan. Upon the reestablishment of Japanese Embassy in Taipei, he served as Counselor of the embassy from 1952 to 1953. In 1957, upon the reestablishment of diplomatic relations between the governments of Japan and Czechoslovakia, was appointed Japanese Ambassador to that country, and served in that position until 1961. In 1961 represented Japan at the World Meteorological Organization. In 1963, he became the new Japanese ambassador to China before moving to South Korea in 1966, and served in that position until 1968.

== See also ==
- List of ambassadors of Japan to Czechoslovakia and the Czech Republic
