= Keinosuke Fujii =

Keinosuke Fujii (藤井 啓之助, Fujii Keinosuke) (1888–March 15, 1959) was a Japanese diplomat. He served as Chargé d'affaires ad interim at the Japanese Embassy in Germany in 1932–1933, and later also in London. Also served as Japanese Ambassador to Czechoslovakia in 1937–1939.

His grandfather was Hirobumi Ito, the first prime minister of Japan. Ichiro Fujisaki, Japanese Ambassador to the United States from 2008, is grandson of Fujii.

== See also ==
- List of ambassadors of Japan to Czechoslovakia and the Czech Republic
- List of Japanese ministers, envoys and ambassadors to Germany
