= North Pacific Anadromous Fish Commission =

- Abbreviation: NPAFC
- Predecessor: International North Pacific Fisheries Commission
- Formation: February 11, 1992; 33 years ago
- Headquarters: Vancouver, BC, Canada
- President: (United States) Jamal Moss
- Vice-President: (Russia) Vladimir Belyaev
- Executive Director: (Japan) Yoshikiyo Kondo
- Deputy Director: -
- Website: Official Website
- Members: Canada, Japan, Republic of Korea, Russian Federation, USA

The North Pacific Anadromous Fish Commission (NPAFC) is an international, inter-governmental organization dedicated to the conservation of anadromous fish stocks in international waters of the North Pacific Ocean and its adjacent seas. It was established on 11 February 1992 by the Convention for the Conservation of Anadromous Stocks in the North Pacific Ocean and originally consisted of four member nations: Canada, Japan, Russian Federation, and United States of America. On 27 May 2003, the Republic of Korea acceded to the Convention bringing the current number of Commission members to five. The primary objective of the Commission is to provide a mechanism for international cooperation promoting the conservation of anadromous stocks in the NPAFC Convention Area of the North Pacific Ocean.

== The Convention ==
The North Pacific Anadromous Fish Commission (NPAFC) was established by the Convention for the Conservation of Anadromous Stocks in the North Pacific Ocean. On 11 February 1992, the Convention was signed by Canada, Japan, the Russian Federation, and the United States of America, and took effect on 16 February 1993. The Republic of Korea later acceded to the Convention on 27 May 2003. As indicated in the Convention, the main objective of the NPAFC is to promote the conservation of anadromous stocks in the North Pacific Ocean. The NPAFC provides a framework for international cooperation on the scientific research of anadromous species and enforcement of fisheries regulations in the Convention Area. The Convention prohibits directed catch of anadromous fish in the Convention Area, but allows for some fishing of these species for scientific purposes under national and joint research programs with prior approval of the NPAFC. The Convention also includes measures to reduce incidental catch of anadromous fish in other high seas fisheries and prohibits the retention of these species on board fishing vessels in the Convention Area.

=== Convention Area ===
The NPAFC Convention area includes the waters of the North Pacific Ocean and adjacent seas (Bering Sea, Sea of Okhotsk), north of 33°N Latitude in international waters beyond the 200-mile zones of coastal states. Although not part of the Convention area, member nations may conduct scientific activities south of 33°N Latitude beyond the 200-mile zone.

=== Species ===
Anadromous fish covered under the Convention include Pacific salmon and steelhead trout:

- Chum salmon (Oncorhynchus keta)
- Coho salmon (Oncorhynchus kisutch)
- Pink salmon (Oncorhynchus gorbuscha)
- Sockeye salmon (Oncorhynchus nerka)
- Chinook salmon (Oncorhynchus tshawytscha)
- Cherry salmon (Oncorhynchus masou)
- Steelhead trout (Oncorhynchus mykiss)

== History ==
INPFC
NPAFC
│
1952
│
1957
│
1962
│
1967
│
1972
│
1977
│
1982
│
1987
│
1992
│
1997
│
2002
│
2007
│
2012
│
2017
│
2022
From INPFC to NPAFC: A History of the Commission

=== International North Pacific Fisheries Commission (INPFC) ===
Following the conclusion of WWII and the signing of the San Francisco Peace Treaty in 1952, Canada, Japan, and the United States of America entered into a trilateral fisheries convention known as the International Convention for the High Seas Fisheries of the North Pacific Ocean. The Convention was signed by all three parties in Tokyo on 9 May 1952 and entered into force on 12 June 1953, thereby creating the International North Pacific Fisheries Commission (INPFC). INPFC nations worked to ensure the maximum sustained productivity of fishery resources in the North Pacific Ocean while encouraging conservation and contributed to the understanding of anadromous fish species, groundfishes, crabs, and marine mammals in the North Pacific Ocean and Bering Sea by publishing scientific bulletins, annual fisheries statistics, and annual reports.

The International Convention for the High Seas Fisheries of the North Pacific Ocean was especially important to Japan, as it helped re-establish the Japanese fishing fleet grounded by the Allied Occupation and provided access to fishing grounds northeast of Hokkaido in the North Pacific. In addition to re-mobilizing the Japanese fishing fleet, however, the Convention established a western abstention line—the westernmost limit the Japanese fleet could fish in the North Pacific Ocean.

The INPFC treaty worked in concert with multiple bi-lateral treaties between Canada, Japan, the USSR, and the US to create a tapestry of policies that formed a North Pacific fisheries management regime. The first significant change to the INPFC treaty came in 1978 after a year of negotiations between members about access to salmon outside of a country's potential Exclusive Economic Zone (EEZ)—a concept developed at the third United Nations Convention on the Law of the Sea (UNCLOS III) in 1973. Most provisions of the original treaty remained in place and a new abstention line at 175° east longitude was developed for Japanese salmon fisherman. The conclusion of UNCLOS III in 1982 and ongoing discussions of a moratorium on pelagic salmon fishing in the North Pacific prompted calls for a re-negotiation of an international salmon treaty by Canada, the US, and the USSR. Japan at first objected to these calls, believing the INPFC framework currently in place to be sufficient, but agreed to re-negotiate a treaty in fear of being excluded from international salmon talks.

=== Establishment of the NPAFC ===
On 11 February 1992, Canada, Japan, Russian Federation, and United States of America signed the Convention for the Conservation of Anadromous Stocks in the North Pacific Ocean. The INPFC dissolved on 16 February 1993 in favor of the North Pacific Anadromous Fish Commission.

The inaugural meeting of the NPAFC was held at the Ottawa Conference Centre in Ottawa, Canada on 24 February 1993, and delegates from Canada, Japan, Russian Federation, and United States of America participated. In accordance with the Convention, the NPAFC adopted rules of procedure, financial rules, and established an organizational structure for the Commission. The Canadian delegation offered to house the Secretariat at the University of British Columbia free of cost, which the Commission accepted. To aid in the transition from INPFC to NPAFC, the Commission decided INPFC funds be used to complete any outstanding INPFC projects and help fund initial operating costs of the NPAFC. The inaugural meeting also decided on the first provisional budget and selected an interim President & Vice-President on ex officio basis until the First Annual Meeting in November, 1993. Finally, a logo committee was created to design the first NPAFC logo which was selected at the First Annual Meeting in Vancouver, Canada. The First President and Vice-President took office 1 November 1993.

On 27 May 2003, the Republic of Korea acceded to the convention in accordance with Article XVIII of the Convention and became the fifth member of the NPAFC.

== Organizational structure ==
The Commission structure was established by the Convention and consists of five parties (member nations). Each party has one vote in the Commission and may appoint up to three representatives. A President and Vice-President are chosen in accordance with Section VIII, Article 11 of the Convention and are considered officers of the Commission.

In accordance with the Convention, the Commission elects a President and Vice-President who serve two-year terms with the condition that both positions are not held by representatives of the same party. Suam Kim (Republic of Korea) currently holds the office of President and James Balsiger (USA) holds the office of Vice-President.

The Commission comprises three committees: the Committee on Scientific Research and Statistics (CSRS), the Committee on Enforcement (ENFO), and the Committee on Finance & Administration (F&A). The current Chairpersons of the three NPAFC Committees are: Masa-aki Fukuwaka (CSRS), Mike Carlson (ENFO), and Vladimir Belyaev (F&A).

The Secretariat is led by an Executive Director and a Deputy Director. The Secretariat is responsible for logistics planning, publishing, and coordinating the flow of information between parties. The Secretariat has five full-time staff members and runs a 6-month internship program which provides young professionals with experience in the operations of an intergovernmental fisheries organization.

Past Officers
Term	President	Vice-President
1993–1995	(Russia) Vyacheslav Zilanov	(Japan) Koji Imamura
1995–1997	(Japan) Koji Imamura	(Canada) David Bevan
1997–1999	(Canada) David Bevan	(United States) Fran Ulmer
1999–2001	(United States) Fran Ulmer	(Russia) Anatoly Makoedov
2001–2003	(Russia) Anatoly Makoedov	(Japan) Koji Imamura
2003–2005	(Japan) Koji Imamura	(Canada) Guy Beaupré
2005–2007	(Canada) Guy Beaupré	(South Korea) Jae Hak Son
2007–2008	(South Korea) Dohyung Koo	(United States) James Balsiger
2008–2009	(South Korea) Suam Kim	(United States) James Balsiger
2009–2011	(United States) James Balsiger	(Russia) Vladimir Belyaev
2011–2014	(Russia) Vladimir Belyaev	(Japan) Junichiro Okamoto
2014–2016	(Japan) Junichiro Okamoto	(Canada) Robin Brown, Carmel Lowe
2016–2018	(Canada) Carmel Lowe	(South Korea) Jeongseok Park, Suam Kim
2018–2021	(South Korea) Suam Kim	(United States) James Balsiger, Doug Mecum

Past NPAFC Chairpersons
Term	CSRS	ENFO	F&A
1993–1996	(Canada) Leo Margolis	(United States) Rick Lauber, (Russia) Vladimir Izmailov	(United States) Rick Lauber
1996–1997	(United States) Loh-Lee Low	(Japan) Satoshi Watanabe, Shuji Ishida	(Russia) Vladimir Izmailov
1997–1999	(Russia) Oleg Gritsenko	(Canada) Dennis Brock	(Japan) Shuji Ishida, Ryozo Kaminokado
1991–2001	(Japan) Yukimasa Ishida	(United States) Vincent O'Shea	(Canada) Aaron Sarna, Gerry Kristianson
2001–2003	(Canada) Richard Beamish	(Russia) Igor Rypalov	(United States) James Balsiger
2003–2005	(United States) Loh-Lee Low	(Japan) Takashi Kato, Akihiro Kizukawa, Koji Miyaura	(Russia) Vladimir Shevlyakov
2005–2007	(Russia) Vladimir Karpenko	(United States) Michael Cerne	(Japan) Koji Miyaura, Kazuaki Tanaka, Hiromi Isa
2007–2009	(Japan) Yukimasa Ishida	(Canada) Robert Martinolich	(Russia) Sergey Maksimov
2009–2011	(South Korea) Jin Yeong Kim	(Japan) Jun Imamura	(Canada) Gerry Kristianson
2011–2014	(Canada) Mark Saunders	(South Korea) Jeongseok Park	(United States) Gary Smith
2014–2016	(United States) Loh-Lee Low	(Russia) Alexey Monakhov, Oleg Volkov	(South Korea) Jeongseok Park
2016–2018	(Russia) Igor Melnikov	(United States) Phillip Thorne, Steven White	(Japan) Junichiro Okamoto
2018–2021	(South Korea) Masa-aki Fukuwaka	(Canada) Mike Carlson, Brad Wattie	(Russia) Vladimir Belyaev

== Science ==
=== Catch and Hatchery Statistics ===
Directed fishing for anadromous stocks in the Convention Area is prohibited, unless for scientific purposes with prior approval from the NPAFC. Directed fisheries and stock assessment activities are conducted by each member nation within their territorial waters. Catch and Hatchery statistics from these activities are reported to NPAFC. Recently, the Commission has created electronic data files that combine catch and hatchery statistics with time-series data and these data files are available to the public.

=== Pacific Salmon and Steelhead High-Seas Tag Recovery Program ===
Tagging of salmon and steelhead with disk tags on high seas research cruises has been conducted since the 1950s in the North Pacific Ocean, Gulf of Alaska, and the Bering Sea. Tag recoveries are used to investigate ocean distribution, migration, and growth of salmon at sea. Some fish may also carry an electronic tag which provides information on the behavior of individual fish, including swimming depth, and additional information on the salmon's habitat.

=== Committee on Scientific Research and Statistics (CSRS) ===
The purpose of the Committee on Scientific Research and Statistics (CSRS) is to provide scientific information to the NPAFC on the state of anadromous stocks and any ecologically related species within the Convention Area, promote the collection, analysis, and exchange of scientific data and specimens, coordinate international efforts to conserve anadromous stocks, review scientific research programs in the Convention Area and adjacent waters, and make recommendations to the NPAFC. The meetings of the CSRS are held during the annual meetings of the NPAFC.

The CSRS has the following sub-committees and working groups:

- Science Sub-Committee
- Working Group on Stock Assessment
- Working Group on Salmon Marking
- Working Group on Stock Identification
- International Year of the Salmon Working Group (discontinued 2023)
- BASIS Working Group (discontinued 2015)
- Working Group on Salmon Tagging (discontinued 2016)

=== NPAFC Science Plan ===
The NPAFC Science Plan is a long-term plan for collaborative scientific research that is drafted by the Science Sub-Committee and reviewed and recommended to the Commission by the CSRS. The overall goal of the current NPAFC Science Plan (NPAFC Science Plan 2023–2027) is to understand changes in Pacific salmon productivity in a changing climate. Under this overall goal, there are five research themes:

1. Status of Pacific Salmon and Steelhead Trout
2. Pacific Salmon and Steelhead Trout in a Changing North Pacific Ocean
3. New Technologies
4. Management Systems
5. Integrated Information Systems

== Enforcement ==
The Committee on Enforcement (ENFO) was established by the Commission under Articles III, IV, V, VI and IX of the Convention and is responsible for the coordination and exchange of enforcement information to ensure compliance with Conservation Measures in the Convention Area. ENFO exchanges information among members on enforcement and inspection of suspected IUU (illegal, unreported, unregulated) fishing in the Convention Area and attempts by fishing vessels of members and non-member countries to avoid compliance with the Convention. Using frequent periodic communications among the fisheries enforcement agencies of its members, ENFO coordinates information on patrol schedules and joint ship patrols, personnel exchanges, flag State enforcement and port State inspection actions, and on unauthorized fishing activities conducted by vessels without nationality operating in the Convention Area.

Enforcement planning meetings are conducted under the auspices of ENFO and are held to plan and coordinate NPAFC-related enforcement activities for the coming months. Participation is restricted to delegations from NPAFC member nations and access to information presented at the meeting is restricted to member participants only.

=== Enforcement Activities ===
NPAFC members identify IUU fishing vessels by utilizing satellite reconnaissance and performing aerial and cutter patrols. The Department of Fisheries and Oceans Canada assists US Coast Guard Cutters and USCG C130's by performing reconnaissance in CP-140 Aurora fix-winged aircraft over the east and central North Pacific. The Japanese Coast Guard deploys Citation V aircraft and CG cutters to intercept IUU vessels, while Russia deploys Kamov KA-27 helicopters and patrol vessels. All vessels and aircraft are assisted by RADARSAT-2 Earth Observation satellites.

From 1993–2015, the cooperative enforcement efforts of the NPAFC Parties resulted in the detection of 47 vessels conducting directed driftnet fishing operations for salmon in the Convention Area. Of those vessels, 20 were apprehended. The largest apprehension of salmon occurred in 1997 during a joint Japanese-American enforcement operation where one hundred and twenty tons of salmon were confiscated from the vessel Nanao 55008.

A complete list of vessel apprehensions may be found here.

Enforcement Vehicles

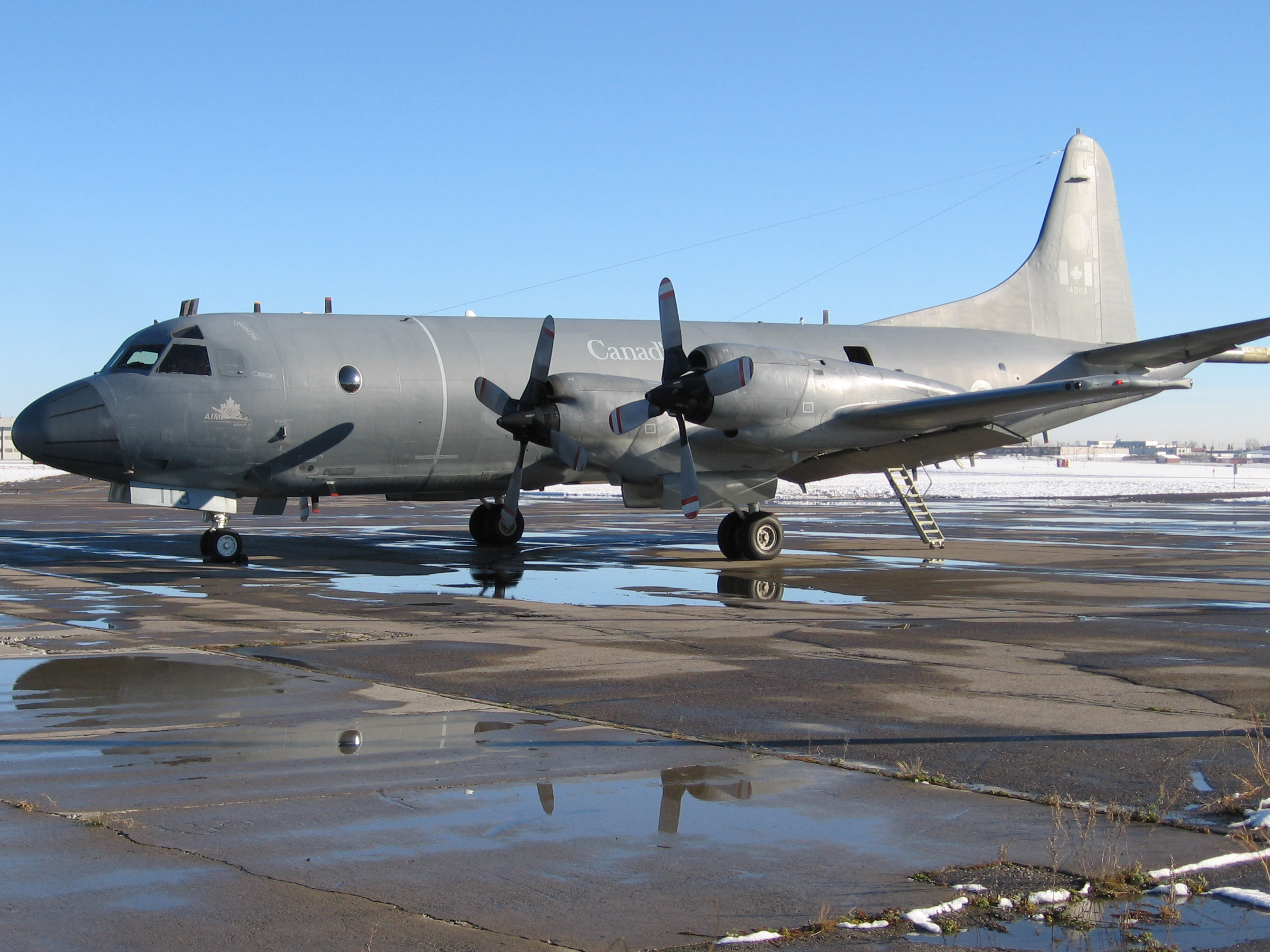
CP-140 Aurora

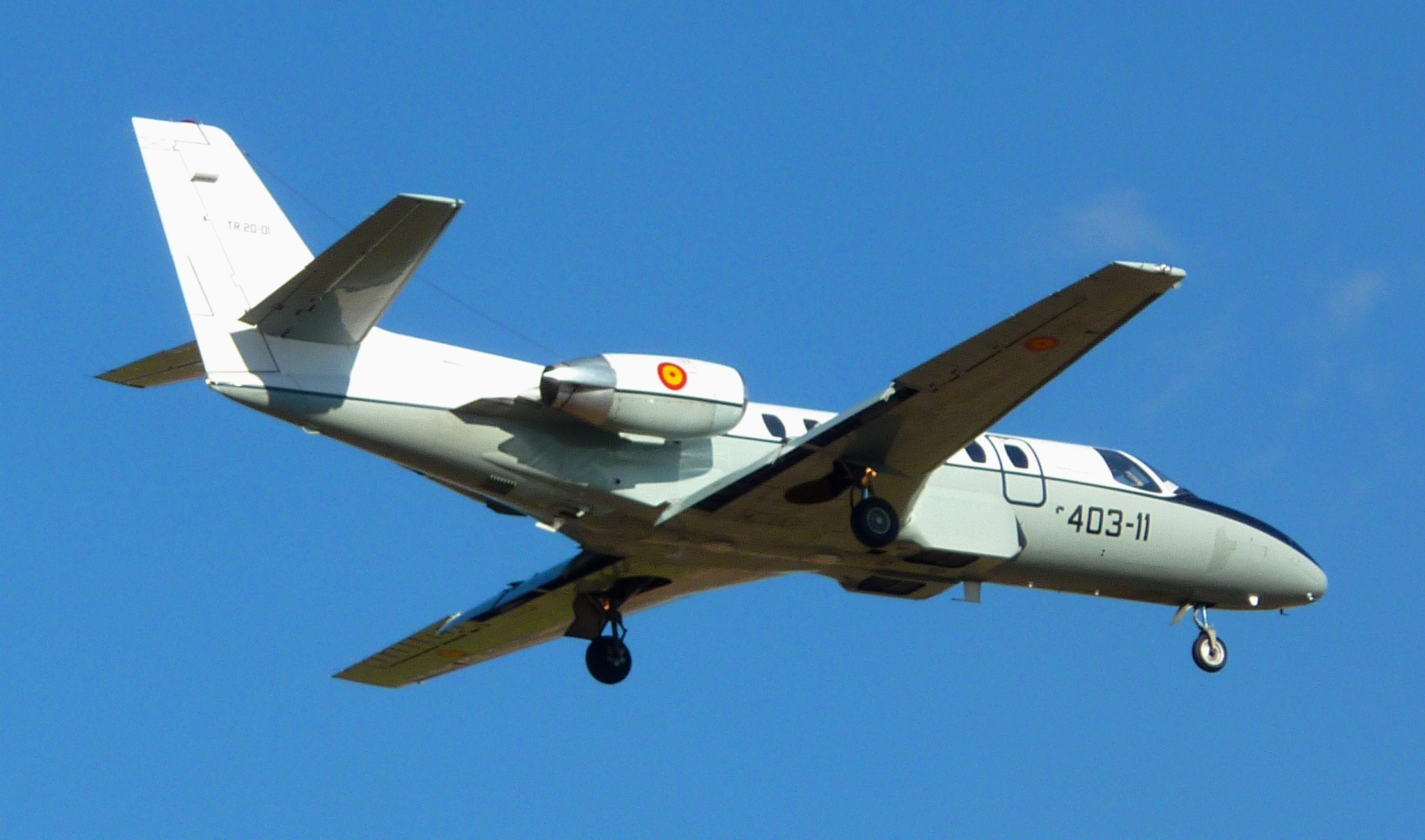
Citation V

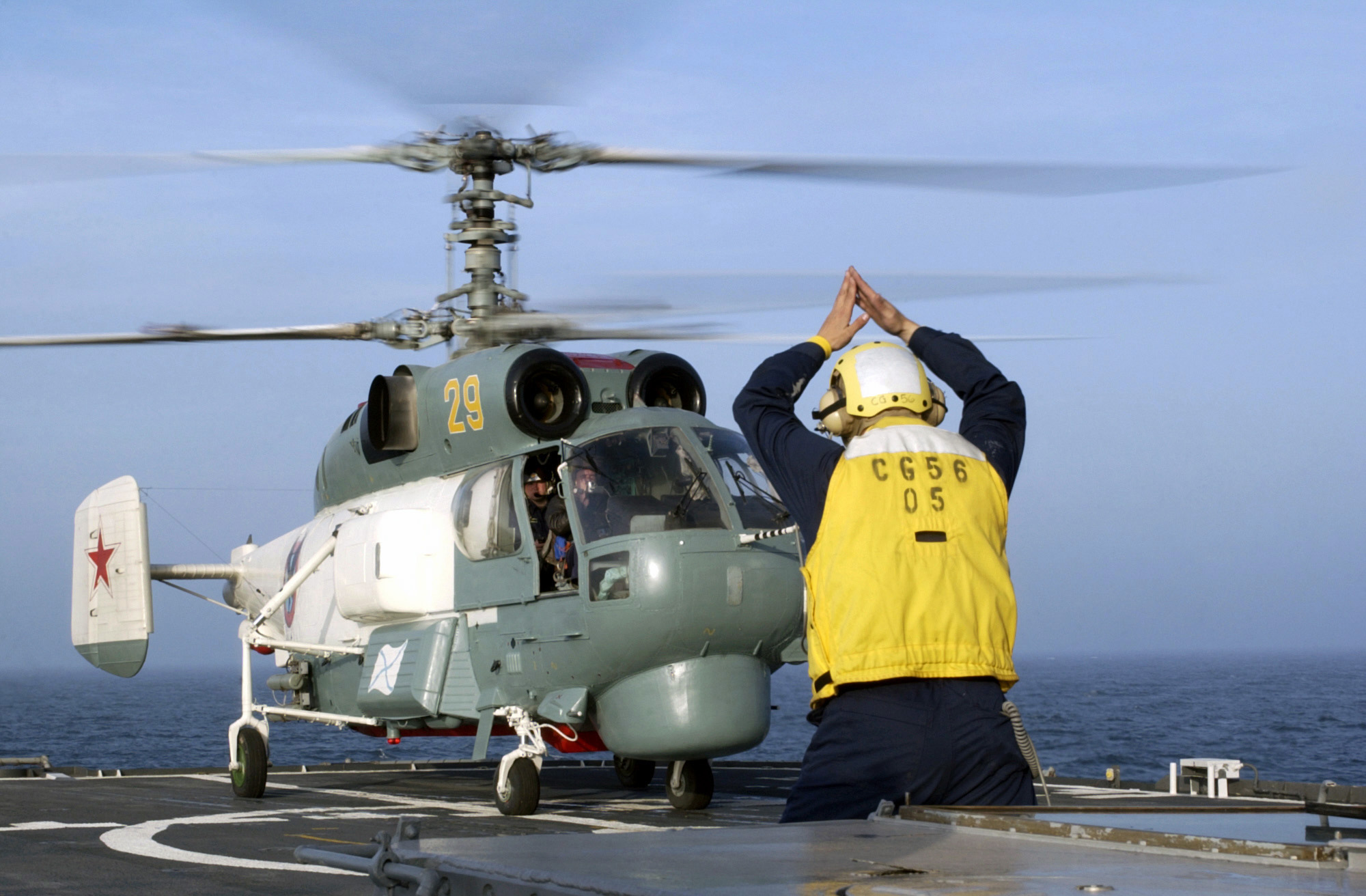
Kamov KA-27 Helix

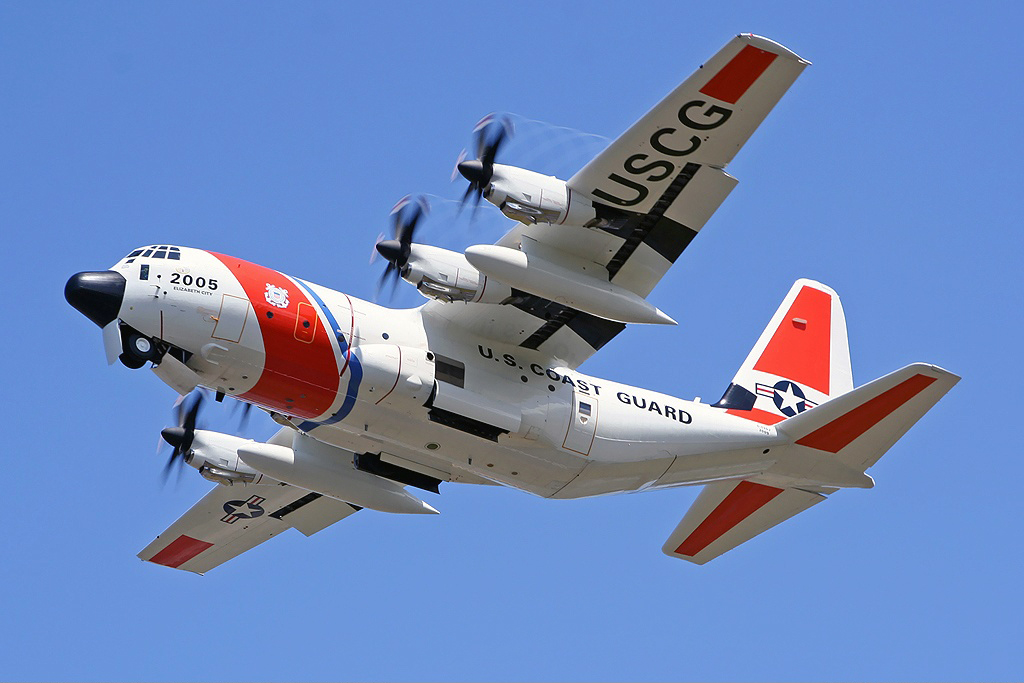
USCG C130

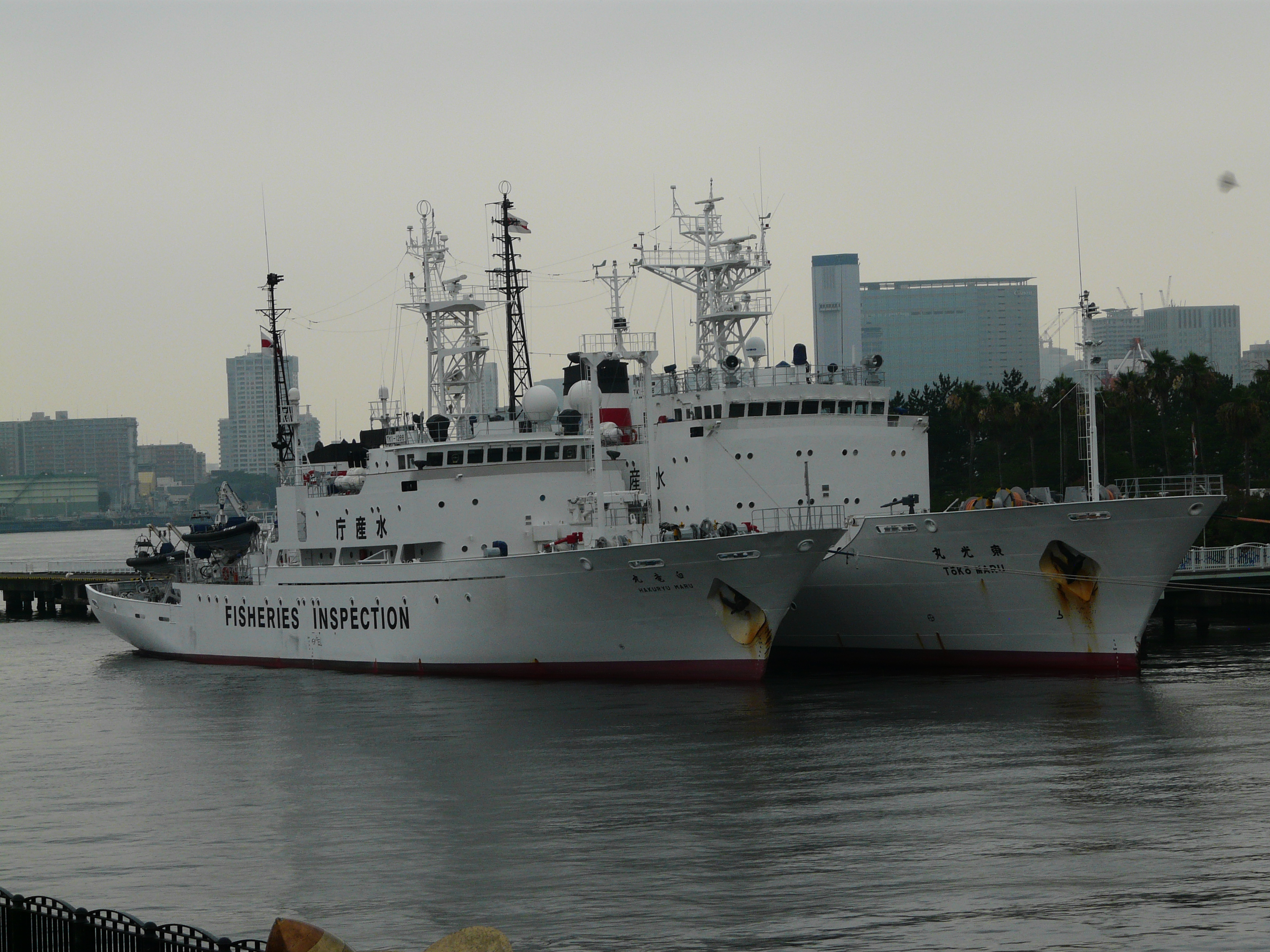
Japanese Vessel

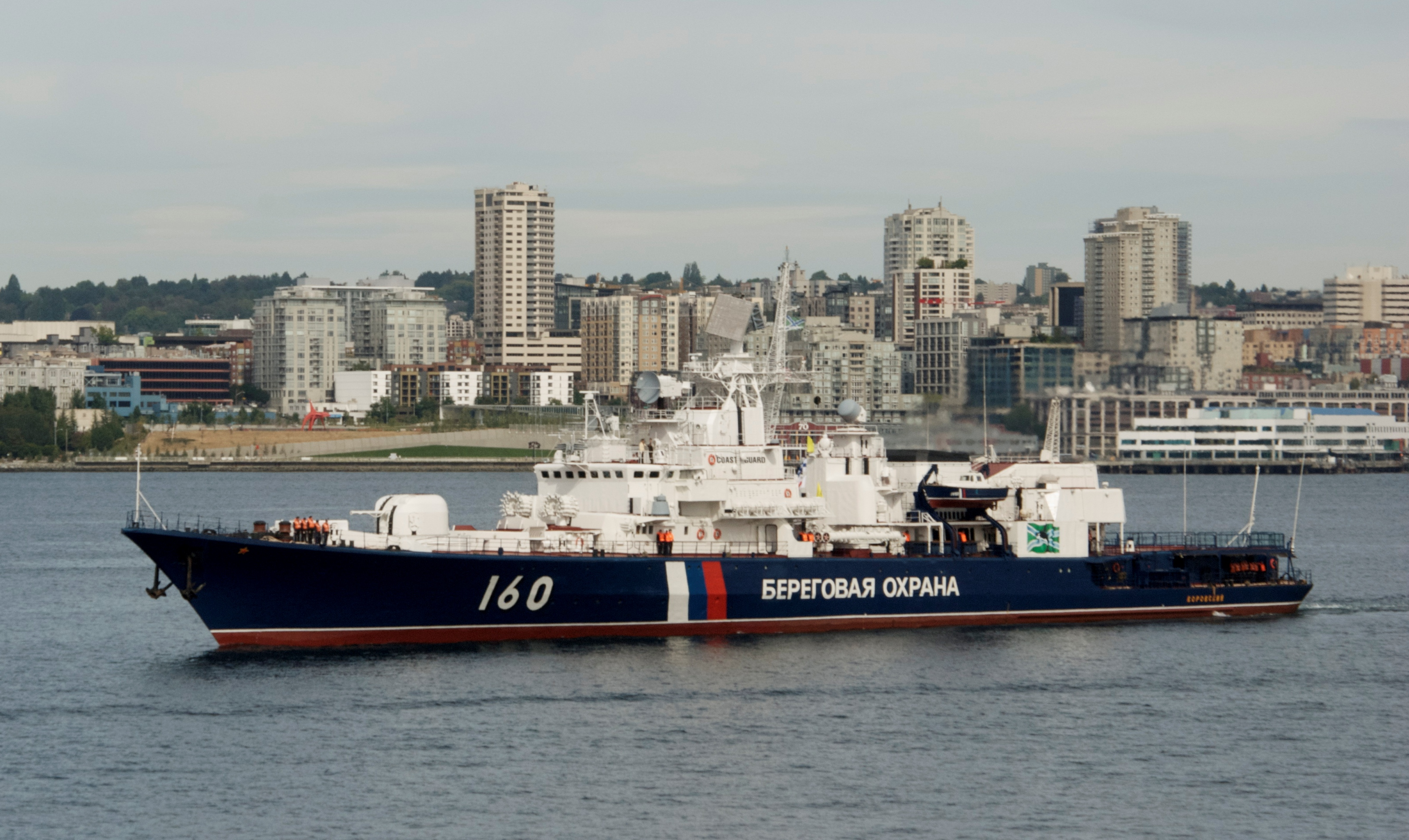
Russian Patrol Vessel

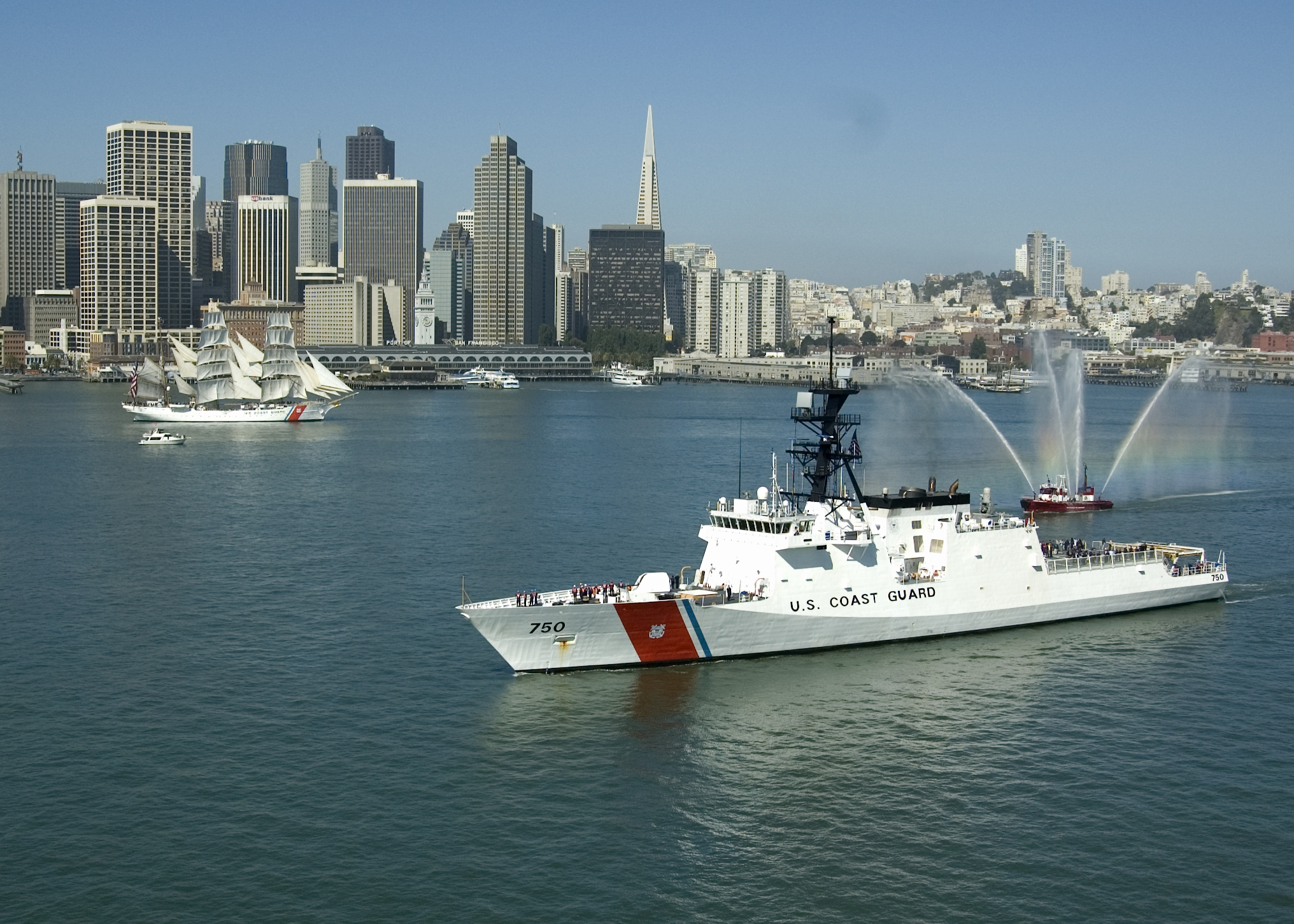
CG Cutters

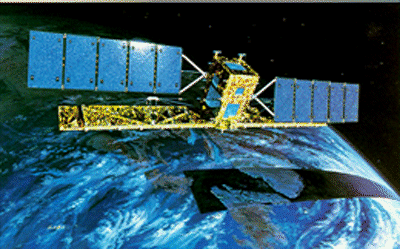
RADARSAT

== International Year of the Salmon ==
The International Year of the Salmon (IYS) is an international initiative to raise the capacity of collaborative outreach and research to meet the issues facing wild salmon, and the communities that benefit them, under the backdrop of increasing environmental variability. The IYS is a joint venture launched by the NPAFC, the North Atlantic Salmon Conservation Organization (NASCO), and other partners. The overall theme of the initiative is 'Salmon and People in a Changing World'. This five year initiative (2018-2022) aims to establish a northern hemispheric-scale partnership of government, Indigenous Peoples, academia, NGOs and industry to effectively address the scientific and social challenges facing salmon and people in an increasingly uncertain environment.

=== Outreach, Engagement, and Education ===
Through outreach, engagement, and education efforts, the IYS will create awareness and advance understanding of challenges facing salmon populations and the communities that are associated with them. These key components include improving public and political awareness of:

- Salmon's cultural, social, and economic importance
- The challenges salmon face from major environmental changes and human impacts

==== "Likely Suspects" Framework ====
In 2017, IYS, led by NPAFC in the Pacific and NASCO in the Atlantic, joined The Atlantic Salmon Trust in developing a framework for conceptualizing survival issues impacting Atlantic salmon during the freshwater migration phase and subsequent marine phases. The approach would take known historical data on salmon abundance and survival and construct a broad-scale model to quantify and partition the losses of salmon in freshwater and at sea. The goal of this will be to identify where and how mortality factors have changed between earlier periods of higher marine survival and the more recent/current low survival phase. It aims to provide coherent guidance on how future research on survival can be identified and prioritized:

- The concept positions candidate mortality factors (Likely Suspects) within an overall spatio-temporal framework (the Likely Suspects Framework) covering the freshwater migration and marine phases of the life cycle. Key geographical areas and periods where mortality factors are known or thought to operate are characterized as ecosystem “domains”.
- Domains can be identified at various locations, ranging from freshwater to overwintering feeding areas, and will be associated with different mortality factors.

This approach will be of interest to managers and policymakers at various levels, since mortality is a cumulative process, with salmon from each stock experiencing mortality at a series of ecosystem domains on the journey before returning to spawn. Management on the local and regional level can be adapted to reflect the known likely suspects, whether that includes habitat restoration, harvest restrictions, or enhancement opportunities.

The Likely Suspects Framework was developed as a Signature Project of the IYS initiative and was the first collaboration between Atlantic and Pacific researchers as part of the IYS.

==== Research ====
An investment in research will also be stimulated by the initiative, which will and leave behind a legacy of knowledge, data/information systems, tools, and a new generation of scientists better equipped to provide timely advice to inform rational management of salmon and build resilience.

The research themes of the IYS have been identified as follows:

- Status of Salmon: to understand the present status of salmon and their environment
- Salmon in a changing salmosphere: to understand and quantify the effects of natural environmental variability and anthropogenic factors affecting salmon distribution and abundance and to make projections of their future changes
- New Frontiers: to develop new technologies and analytical methods to advance salmon science and to explore the uncharted regions of the salmosphere
- Human Dimension: to investigate the cultural, social, and economic elements that depend upon sustainable salmon populations
- Information Systems: to develop an integrated archive of accessible electronic data collected during the IYS and tools to support future research

==== International High Seas Expeditions ====
In February 2019, an International Gulf of Alaska Expedition was completed with 21 scientific personnel from five Pacific Rim countries, Canada, Japan, Korea, Russia and the United States, aboard the chartered 62 m Russian R/V Professor Kaganovskiy. The expedition was organized by Dr. Richard J. Beamish, the Pacific Salmon Foundation and NPAFC with funding from private individuals, government agencies and NGOs. It was the first in decades to study salmon in the winter high seas and set a precedent for addressing gaps in our knowledge through survey work of salmon, plankton and physical conditions in the central Gulf of Alaska.

Building on the single vessel expedition conducted from February-March 2019 in the Gulf of Alaska, a 2021 International Pan-Pacific Expedition has been proposed. If implemented, it will employ up to five research vessels operating simultaneously to survey the full breadth of the North Pacific Ocean in winter 2021. Similar to the 2019 voyage, these vessels would carry leading scientists from Canada, Japan, Korea, Russia and the United States, all committed to answering questions about the mechanisms affecting the productivity and distribution of salmon. Aside from increasing the area surveyed, the 2021 Expedition would diversify data collection. Three to four vessels would cover a pan-Pacific grid while another would conduct fine scale research to provide greater detail for our understanding of how salmon interact with the high seas environment. In conjunction with the tentative 2021 winter surveys, NPAFC member countries would conduct coastal and high seas salmon surveys during the spring, summer and fall of 2020-2021. The 2021 Expedition has the potential to provide a platform for international collaborative ecosystem research to monitor the distribution, abundance and productivity of salmon to directly inform fisheries management and enforcement decisions to be made in an increasingly uncertain future.

Both the completed 2019 and proposed 2021 Expeditions are Signature Projects of the IYS.

=== Timeline ===
The focal year of the IYS was 2019, with the opening symposium occurring in late 2018, and activities lasting until 2022.

2016–2017	Planning, coordinating, enlisting partners, contributors
2018	Opening event, outreach
2018–2019	Field seasons, new data collection, outreach
2020–2022	Final analysis, wrap-up, publication, archiving

== Publications ==
The NPAFC produces a number of publications for members and the public including: scientific bulletins, technical reports, special publications, annual reports, and newsletters. Annual reports are published annually, while newsletters are published bi-annually. Bulletins, technical reports, special reports, and other reports are published irregularly.

Publication	Cover Page	Title	Date
Bulletin No. 1		Assessment and Status of Pacific Rim Salmonid Stocks	1998
Bulletin No. 2		Recent Changes in Ocean Production of Pacific Salmon	2000
Bulletin No. 3		A Review of the Research on the Early Marine Period of Pacific Salmon by Canada, Japan, Russia, and the United States	2003
Bulletin No. 4		Status of Pacific Salmon and Their Role in North Pacific Marine Ecosystems	2007
Bulletin No. 5		Climate Change, Production Trends, and Carrying Capacity of Pacific Salmon in the Bering Sea and Adjacent Waters	2009
Bulletin No. 6		Pacific Salmon and Steelhead Production in a Changing Climate: Past, Present, and Future	2016
Bulletin No. 7		Salmon in a Rapidly Changing World: Synthesis of the International Year of the Salmon and a Roadmap to 2030	2025
Technical Report No 1.		Climate Change and Salmon Production	1998
Technical Report No 2.		Comparative Studies on Juvenile Salmon Ecology between the East and West North Pacific Ocean	2001
Technical Report No 3.		Salmonid Otolith Marking	2001
Technical Report No 4.		Causes of Marine Mortality of Salmon in the North Pacific and North Atlantic Oceans and in the Baltic Sea	2002
Technical Report No 5.		Application of Stock Identification in Defining Marine Distribution and Migration of Salmon	2004
Technical Report No 6.		BASIS 2004: Salmon and Marine Ecosystems in the Bering Sea and Adjacent Waters	2005
Technical Report No 7.		BASIS 2004: Second International Workshop on Factors Affecting Production of Juvenile Salmon: Survival Strategy of Asian and North American Juvenile Salmon in the Ocean	2007
Technical Report No 8.		International Workshop on Explanations for the High Abundance of Pink and Chum Salmon and Future Trends	2012
Technical Report No 9.		3rd International Workshop on Migration and Survival Mechanisms of Juvenile Salmon and Steelhead in Ocean Ecosystems	2013
Technical Report No 10.		Story of the International Year of the Salmon: Concept to Launch	2017
Technical Report No 11.		First NPAFC-IYS Workshop on Pacific Salmon Production in a Changing Climate	2018
Technical Report No 12.		Report of the Proceedings for the IYS Workshop—Toward Effective Coupling of the Science of a Changing Climate with Salmon and People	2019
Technical Report No 13.		Report of the Proceedings for the IYS Workshop—International Year of the Salmon Workshop on Salmon Status and Trends	2019
Technical Report No 14.		Report of the Proceedings for the IYS Workshop—First International Year of the Salmon Data Laboratory (ISDL) Workshop	2019
Technical Report No 15.		Second NPAFC-IYS Workshop on Salmon Ocean Ecology in a Changing Climate	2019
Technical Report No 16.		Roadmap to Develop the Likely Suspects Framework: Salmonscape Workshop Series	2021
Technical Report No 17.		Third NPAFC-IYS Virtual Workshop on Linkages between Pacific Salmon Production and Environmental Changes	2021
Technical Report No 18.		Virtual Conference on Winter Ecology of Pacific Salmon and Results from the Two Gulf of Alaska Expeditions	2022
Technical Report No 19.		The Status and Trends of Pacific Salmon and Steelhead Trout Stocks with Linkages to their Ecosystem	2023
Technical Report No 20.		International Year of the Salmon 2022 Pan-Pacific Winter High Seas Expedition Hybrid Preliminary Results Meeting Summary	2023
Technical Report No 21.		A Review of Pink Salmon in the Pacific, Arctic, and Atlantic Oceans	2023
Technical Report No 22.		Report of the Final Workshop (November 1–2, 2023) Describing Observations Made during Winter Surveys of the International Year of the Salmon Expeditions to the Gulf of Alaska	2023
Technical Report No 23.		First Workshop on Developing a Mechanistic Understanding of the Impact of a Changing Climate on Salmon Abundance and Distribution Trends	2025
Special Publication 1.		A Long-term Research and Monitoring Plan (LRMP) for Pacific Salmon in the North Pacific Ocean	2009
Special Publication 2.		Climate Impacts on Pacific Salmon: Bibliography	2010

=== Other publications ===
- Science Plan 1995–96
- Science Plan 1997–98
- Science Plan 2001–2005
- NPAFC "Activities and Science Plan 2006-2010" Brochure
- Science Plan 2006–2010
- Science Plan 2011–2015
- Science Plan 2016–2022

== Internship Program ==
The NPAFC Secretariat hosts citizens from member nations for the internship program which runs for approximately 6-months. Generally the Commission accepts one intern per year, although two interns were chosen in the years 2016–2018. The objective of the NPAFC internship is to help early-career professionals gain experience and knowledge in operations of the Commission and provide an opportunity to test their interest in international governmental organizations, management, fisheries, biology, ecology, and fisheries enforcement.

== NPAFC Award ==
The NPAFC Award was established in 2011 to recognize an individual for significant and sustained contributions in the areas of scientific research, enforcement, international cooperation, or management for the conservation of any anadromous salmon and/or steelhead stock during the marine life history phase in the North Pacific Ocean.

The award is presented by the NPAFC President at the Second Plenary Session of the Annual Meeting and consists of a plaque engraved with the recipient's name. A large plaque is maintained at the NPAFC Secretariat with the names of all the award winners, which grows as the names accumulate over time. The recipient will receive financial support, if necessary, to attend the First Plenary and receive the award.

Award winners

- Richard Beamish (2012)
- Vyacheslav Shuntov (2012)
- Katherine Myers (2014)
- Koji Imamura (2015)
- Wakako Morris (2016)
- Loh-Lee Low (2017)
- John V. O'Shea (2019)
- James Irvine (2021)
- Shigehiko Urawa (2021)
