= Kuniaki Asomura =

Japanese diplomat

Kuniaki Asomura (阿曽村 邦昭, Asomura Kuniaki) was a Japanese diplomat.

== Biography ==
Asomura served during the 1960s as 2nd Secretary of the Japanese Embassy in the Netherlands. He served as the last Japanese Ambassador to Czechoslovakia prior to its breakup in 1993 and the first Ambassador to the Czech Republic. Also served as Japanese Ambassador to Guyana, and in that capacity concluded on November 24, 1995 an agreement between the two countries providing for Japanese assistance in the improvement of electric infrastructures in Guyana.

== Retirement ==
Following his retirement from the Japanese Ministry of Foreign Affairs, joined the board of directors of the international humanitarian organization Japan Platform. Also joined The Japan Center for Preventive Diplomacy.

Now, he is a professor of North Asia University in Akita.

== See also ==
- List of ambassadors of Japan to Czechoslovakia and the Czech Republic
