= Katsunosuke Inoue =

Japanese diplomat and businessman (1861–1929)

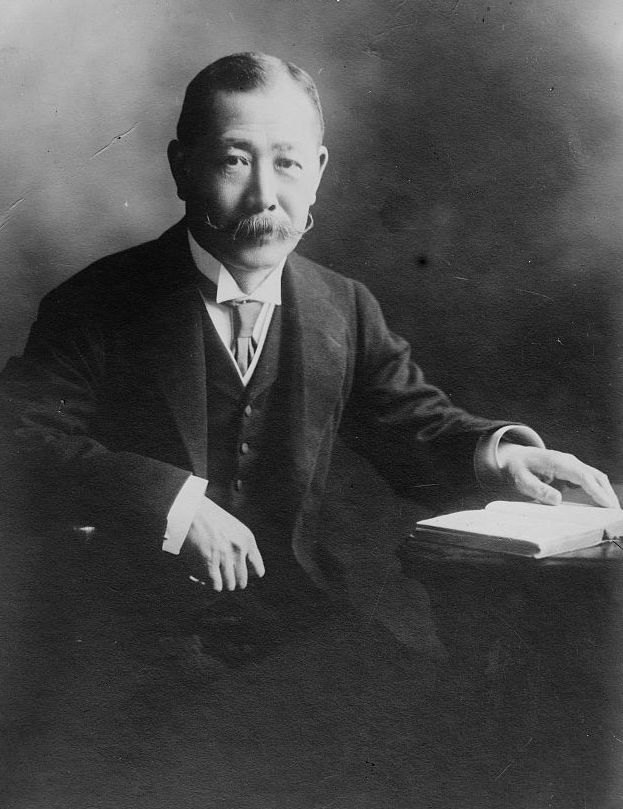
Katsunosuke Inoue in London

Marquess Katsunosuke Inoue (井上 勝之助, Inoue Katsunosuke; August 16, 1861 - November 3, 1929) was a Japanese diplomat and businessman.

== Diplomatic career ==
He was born in Suō Province, a son of Mitsuto Inoue. Katsunosuke was adopted by his uncle, Kaoru Inoue, after his father died in 1869.

Inoue served as Minister Plenipotentiary to Belgium in 1898. In 1898-1906, he served as Minister Plenipotentiary in Berlin.

He was Japan's ambassador in Germany (1906-1908), in Chile (1910–1913) and in the United Kingdom in 1913-1916.

Inoue was a director of the Manchurian Railway.

== See also ==
- List of Japanese ministers, envoys and ambassadors to Germany
