= Eki Hioki =

Japanese diplomat

- 日置益
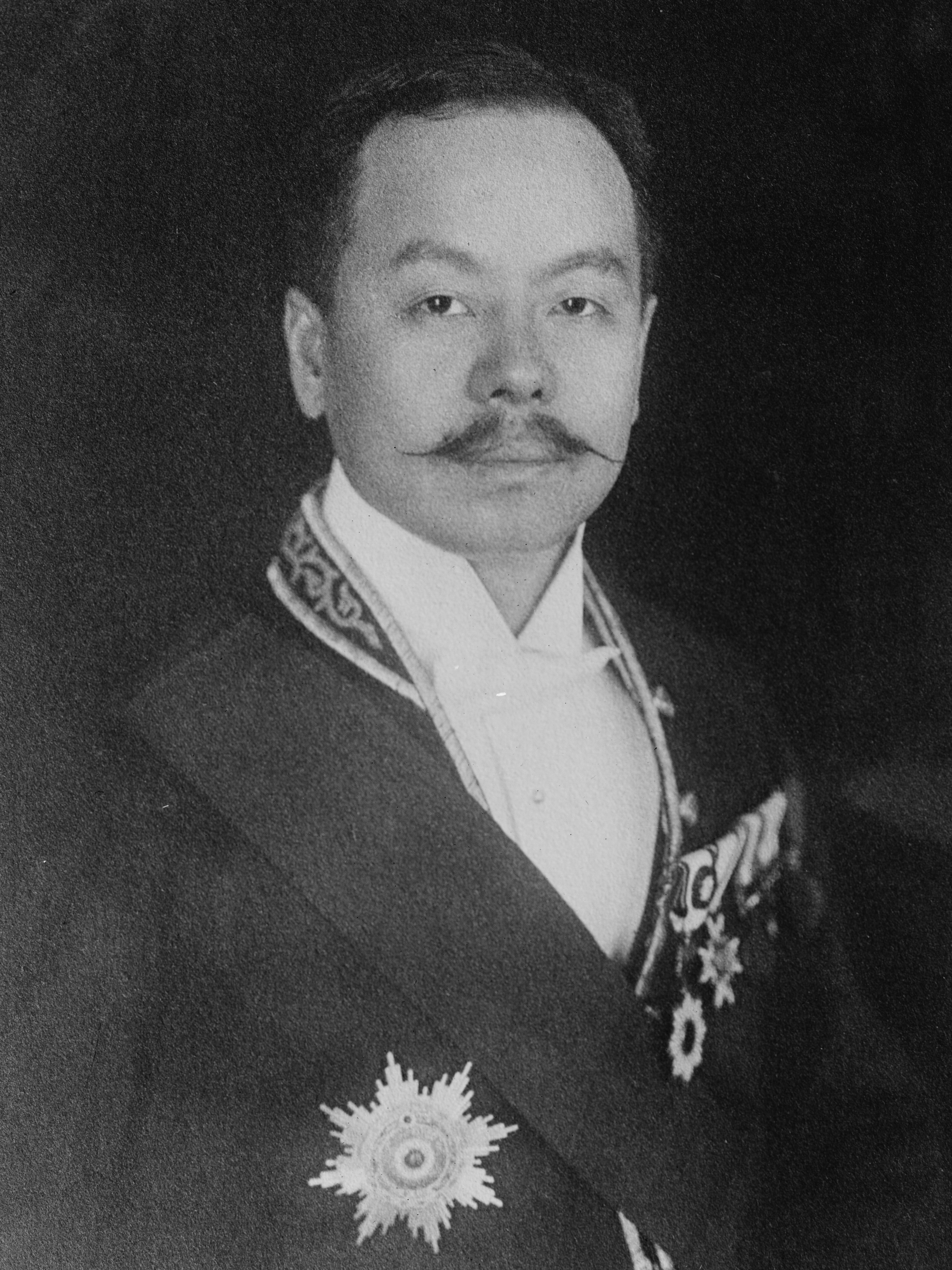
- Born: December 21, 1861; Mie Prefecture, Japan
- Died: October 22, 1926 (aged 64)
- Occupations: Diplomat, ambassador

Eki Hioki (日置益) (December 21, 1861 – October 22, 1926) was a Japanese diplomat. Between 1907 and 1924, Hioki served as Japan's ambassador to Chile and Peru, China, Denmark and Sweden, and Germany; he was also prominent in Washington, D.C., as chargé d'affaires of the Japanese legation there in 1905 and 1906.

== Early life and education ==
Hioki was born in Mie Prefecture, the son of a samurai, Inemon Hioki. His father-in-law, Heizaburō Hoshino, was also a samurai. He studied law at Tokyo Imperial University, graduating in 1887.

== Career ==
Hioki entered the Japanese foreign service in 1888. He was an attache at the Japanese consulate in New York City in 1889. In 1905 and 1906 he was the chief secretary of the Japanese legation in Washington, D.C. While in the United States, he toured several cities and an Ohio cornfield, and was described in the American press as intelligent, inquisitive, and fluent in English.

Hioki served as ambassador to Germany from September 1907 to August 1908. From 1908 to 1914 he served as ambassador to Chile and Peru. From 1914 to 1916 he was ambassador to China. In that position, he presented the Chinese government with the 21 demands regarding Japanese interests in China in 1915. He was vice-president of the America-Japan Society, organized in 1917.

From 1918 to 1920 he served as ambassador to Denmark and Sweden and from 1921 to 1924 he was again ambassador in Germany. He was rumored to be returning to a diplomatic post in Washington, D.C. in 1924.

Hioki died from a stomach ulcer and kidney disease in 1926, at the age of 64.
