= Kintomo Mushanokōji =

Japanese diplomat and viscount

Viscount Kintomo Mushanokōji
- 武者小路 公共
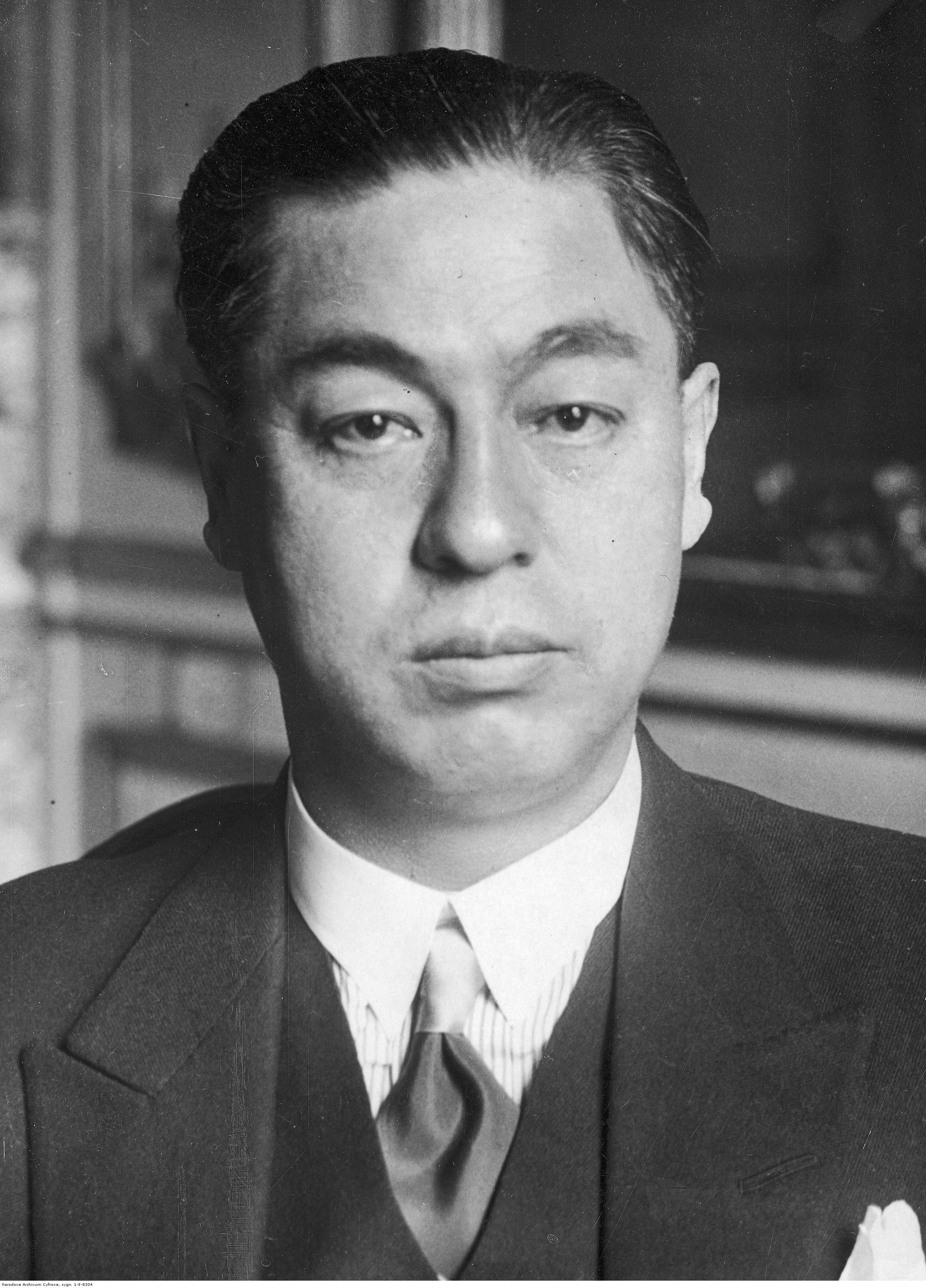
- Mushanokōji on 28 November 1934
- Born: August 29, 1882; Kōjimachi, Tokyo, Japan
- Died: April 21, 1962 (aged 79); Japan
- Occupations: Diplomat, ambassador
- Children: Kinhide Mushakoji

Viscount Kintomo Mushanokōji (武者小路 公共, Mushanokōji Kintomo; August 29, 1882 – April 21, 1962) (also spelled Mushakoji) was a Japanese diplomat before and during World War II.

== Biography ==
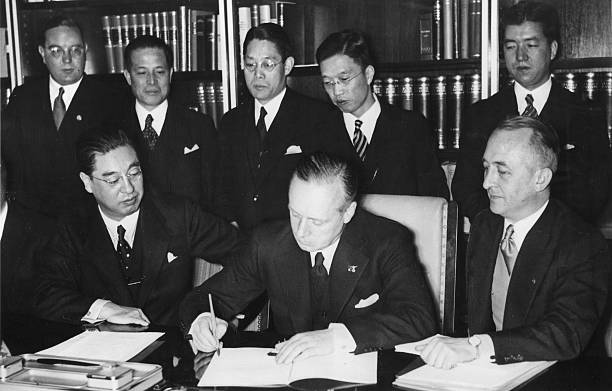
Ambassador Mushanokōji signing Anti-Comintern Pact with Joachim von Ribbentrop

Mushanokōji was the third son of Viscount Saneyo Mushanokōji (1852–1887) in the 10th generation of the aristocratic Mushanokōji family and born in Kōjimachi, Chiyoda, Japan. He graduated from the Law School of Tokyo Imperial University. His younger brother was part of the delegation to the Eleventh Ordinary Session of the Assembly of the League of Nations and the delegation to the Special Session of the Assembly Convened in Virtue of Article 15 of the Covenant at the Request of the Republic of China Government.

From 1929 to 1933, he served as Japanese Ambassador to Sweden and non-resident Ambassador to Finland and in that capacity signed on behalf of the Japanese government the Convention on Certain Questions Relating to the Conflict of Nationality Laws (April 12, 1930). He served as Japanese Ambassador to Germany from 1934 to 1937 and in that capacity signed the Anti-Comintern Pact as the representative of Japan. A viscount, he received the Grand Cross of the Royal Order of the Polar Star (Sweden) in 1933.

After World War II, he was purged from public office by the occupation authorities. From 1952 to 1955, he served as chairman of the Japanese-German Society.

== Personal life ==
Kintomo Mushanokōji was the brother of the writer and poet Saneatsu Mushanokōji. His son was political scientist Kinhide Mushakoji (1929–2022).

== See also ==
- List of Ambassadors of Japan to Finland
- List of Japanese ministers, envoys and ambassadors to Germany
