= List of ambassadors of Japan to the United Kingdom =

The List of Japanese ministers, envoys and ambassadors to the United Kingdom started when Sameshima Naonobu presented his credentials to the British government in 1870.

== List ==
This is a chronological list of Japanese diplomats.

Inaugural date	Official position (Japanese)	Official position	Name (Japanese)	Name
October 3, 1870	少弁務使	Chargé d'affaires	鮫島 尚信	Sameshima Naonobu
May 17, 1872	大弁務使	Minister resident	寺島 宗則	Terashima Munenori
February 20, 1873	特命全権公使	Minister Plenipotentiary	寺島 宗則	Terashima Munenori
April 14, 1873	臨時代理公使	Chargé d'affaires ad interim	本野 盛亨	Motono Morimichi
October 13, 1874	特命全権公使	Minister Plenipotentiary	上野 景範	Ueno Kagenori
May 9, 1879	臨時代理公使	Chargé d'affaires ad interim	富田 鉄之助	Tomita Tetsunosuke
November 19, 1879	特命全権公使	Minister Plenipotentiary	森 有礼	Mori Arinori
February 26, 1884	臨時代理公使	Chargé d'affaires ad interim	大山 綱介	Oyama Tsunasuke
November 10, 1884	特命全権公使	Minister Plenipotentiary	河瀬 真孝	Kawase Masataka
September 29, 1888	臨時代理公使	Chargé d'affaires ad interim	岡部 長職	Okabe Nagamoto
November 20, 1889	特命全権公使	Minister Plenipotentiary	河瀬 真孝	Kawase Masataka
December 20, 1893	臨時代理公使	Chargé d'affaires ad interim	内田 康哉	Uchida Kōsai
February 22, 1894	特命全権公使	Minister Plenipotentiary	青木 周蔵	Aoki Shūzō
March 23, 1895	特命全権公使	Minister Plenipotentiary	加藤 高明	Katō Takaaki
April 17, 1899	臨時代理公使	Chargé d'affaires ad interim	松井 慶四郎	Matsui Keishirō
July 6, 1900	特命全権公使	Minister Plenipotentiary	林 董	Hayashi Tadasu
December 2, 1905	特命全権大使	Ambassador	林 董	Hayashi Tadasu
March 20, 1906	臨時代理大使	Chargé d'affaires ad interim	陸奥 広吉	Mutsu Hirokichi
August 16, 1906	特命全権大使	Ambassador	小村 壽太郞	Komura Jutarō
July 27, 1908	臨時代理大使	Chargé d'affaires ad interim	陸奥 広吉	Mutsu Hirokichi
September 21, 1908	臨時代理大使	Chargé d'affaires ad interim	山座 円次郎	Yamaza Enjirō
February 11, 1909	特命全権大使	Ambassador	加藤 高明	Katō Takaaki
January 12, 1913	臨時代理大使	Chargé d'affaires ad interim	小池 張造	Koike Chōzō
June 18, 1913	特命全権大使	Ambassador	井上 勝之助	Inoue Katsunosuke
July 20, 1916	特命全権大使	Ambassador	珍田 捨巳	Chinda Sutemi
August 21, 1920	臨時代理大使	Chargé d'affaires ad interim	永井 松三	Nagai Matsuzō
September 4, 1920	特命全権大使	Ambassador	林 権助	Hayashi Gonsuke
August 1, 1925	臨時代理大使	Chargé d'affaires ad interim	吉田 伊三郎	Yoshida Isaburō
August 18, 1925	特命全権大使	Ambassador	松井 慶四郎	Matsui Keishirō
April 10, 1928	臨時代理大使	Chargé d'affaires ad interim	佐分利 貞男	Saburi Sadao
January 13, 1929	特命全権大使	Ambassador	松平 恆雄	Matsudaira Tsuneo
July 6, 1935	臨時代理大使	Chargé d'affaires ad interim	藤井 啓之助	Fujii Keinosuke
June 24, 1936	特命全権大使	Ambassador	吉田 茂	Yoshida Shigeru
October 19, 1938	臨時代理大使	Chargé d'affaires ad interim	岡本 季正	Okamoto Suemasa
October 25, 1938	特命全権大使	Ambassador	重光 葵	Shigemitsu Mamoru
June 29, 1941	臨時代理大使	Chargé d'affaires ad interim	上村 伸一	Kamimura Shinichi
July 18, 1942	Second World War			
August 29, 1951	在ロンドン在外事務所長	Chief of Overseas Agency in London	朝海 浩一郎	Asakai Kōichirō
April 28, 1952	臨時代理大使	Chargé d'affaires ad interim	朝海 浩一郎	Asakai Kōichirō
May 3, 1952	特命全権大使	Ambassador	朝海 浩一郎	Asakai Kōichirō
June 8, 1952	特命全権大使	Ambassador	松本 俊一	Matsumoto Shunichi
January 12, 1955	臨時代理大使	Chargé d'affaires ad interim	黄田 多喜夫	Ouda Takio
June 12, 1955	特命全権大使	Ambassador	西 春彦	Nishi Haruhiko
December 18, 1957	臨時代理大使	Chargé d'affaires ad interim	中川 融	Nakagawa Tōru
May 5, 1958	特命全権大使	Ambassador	大野 勝巳	Ōno Katsumi
April 2, 1964	臨時代理大使	Chargé d'affaires ad interim	宇山 厚	Uyama Atsushi
June 22, 1964	特命全権大使	Ambassador	島 重信	Shima Shigenobu
May 22, 1968	臨時代理大使	Chargé d'affaires ad interim	木本 三郎	Kimoto Saburō
June 22, 1968	特命全権大使	Ambassador	湯川 盛夫	Yukawa Morio
October 7, 1972	臨時代理大使	Chargé d'affaires ad interim	高橋 正太郎	Takahashi Shōtarō
October 11, 1972	特命全権大使	Ambassador	森 治樹	Mori Haruki
July 5, 1975	臨時代理大使	Chargé d'affaires ad interim	中島 敏太郎	Nakajima Toshijirō
July 20, 1975	特命全権大使	Ambassador	加藤 匡夫	Katō Tadao
February 10, 1979	臨時代理大使	Chargé d'affaires ad interim	小村 康一	Komura Kouichi
March 29, 1979	特命全権大使	Ambassador	藤山 楢一	Fujiyama Naraichi
January 15, 1982	臨時代理大使	Chargé d'affaires ad interim	堤 功一	Tsutsumi Kōichi
February 13, 1982	特命全権大使	Ambassador	平原 毅	Hirahara Tsuyoshi
January 22, 1985	臨時代理大使	Chargé d'affaires ad interim	関 栄次	Seki Eiji
January 26, 1985	特命全権大使	Ambassador	山崎 敏夫	Yamasaki Toshio
March 12, 1988	臨時代理大使	Chargé d'affaires ad interim	瀨崎 克已	Sezaki Katsumi
March 15, 1988	特命全権大使	Ambassador	千葉 一夫	Chiba Kazuo
January 4, 1991	臨時代理大使	Chargé d'affaires ad interim	竹內 行夫	Takeuchi Yukio
January 20, 1991	特命全権大使	Ambassador	北村 汎	Kitamura Hiroshi
1994	特命全権大使	Ambassador	藤井 宏昭	Fujii Hiroaki
1997	特命全権大使	Ambassador	林 貞行	Hayashi Sadayuki
2001	特命全権大使	Ambassador	折田 正樹	Orita Masaki
2004	特命全権大使	Ambassador	野上 義二	Nogami Yoshiji
2008	特命全権大使	Ambassador	海老原 紳	Ebihara Shin
2011	特命全権大使	Ambassador	林 景一	Hayashi Keiichi
2016	特命全権大使	Ambassador	鶴岡 公二	Tsuruoka Koji
2019	特命全権大使	Ambassador	長嶺 安政	Nagamine Yasumasa
2020	特命全権大使	Ambassador	林 肇	Hayashi Hajime
2024	特命全権大使	Ambassador	鈴木 浩	Suzuki Hiroshi

== See also ==
- List of ambassadors of the United Kingdom to Japan
- Japanese people in the United Kingdom
- Japan–United Kingdom relations
- Diplomatic rank
