= Takeo Akiba =

Japanese diplomat (born 1958)

- 秋葉 剛男
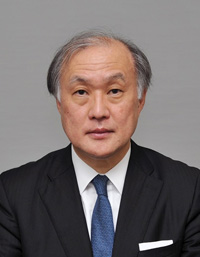
- Official portrait, 2021

National Security Advisor to the Cabinet
- In office 7 July 2021 – 20 January 2025
- Prime Minister: Yoshihide Suga; Fumio Kishida; Shigeru Ishiba
- Preceded by: Shigeru Kitamura
- Succeeded by: Masataka Okano

Personal details
- Born: 19 December 1958 (age 67) Kawasaki, Kanagawa, Japan
- Education: University of Tokyo

Takeo Akiba (秋葉 剛男, Akiba Takeo, born 19 December 1958) is a Japanese diplomat who served as National Security Advisor to the Cabinet from 2021 to 2025. He had a long career as a diplomat in the Ministry of Foreign Affairs, serving as administrative vice minister from 2018 to 2021.

== Biography ==
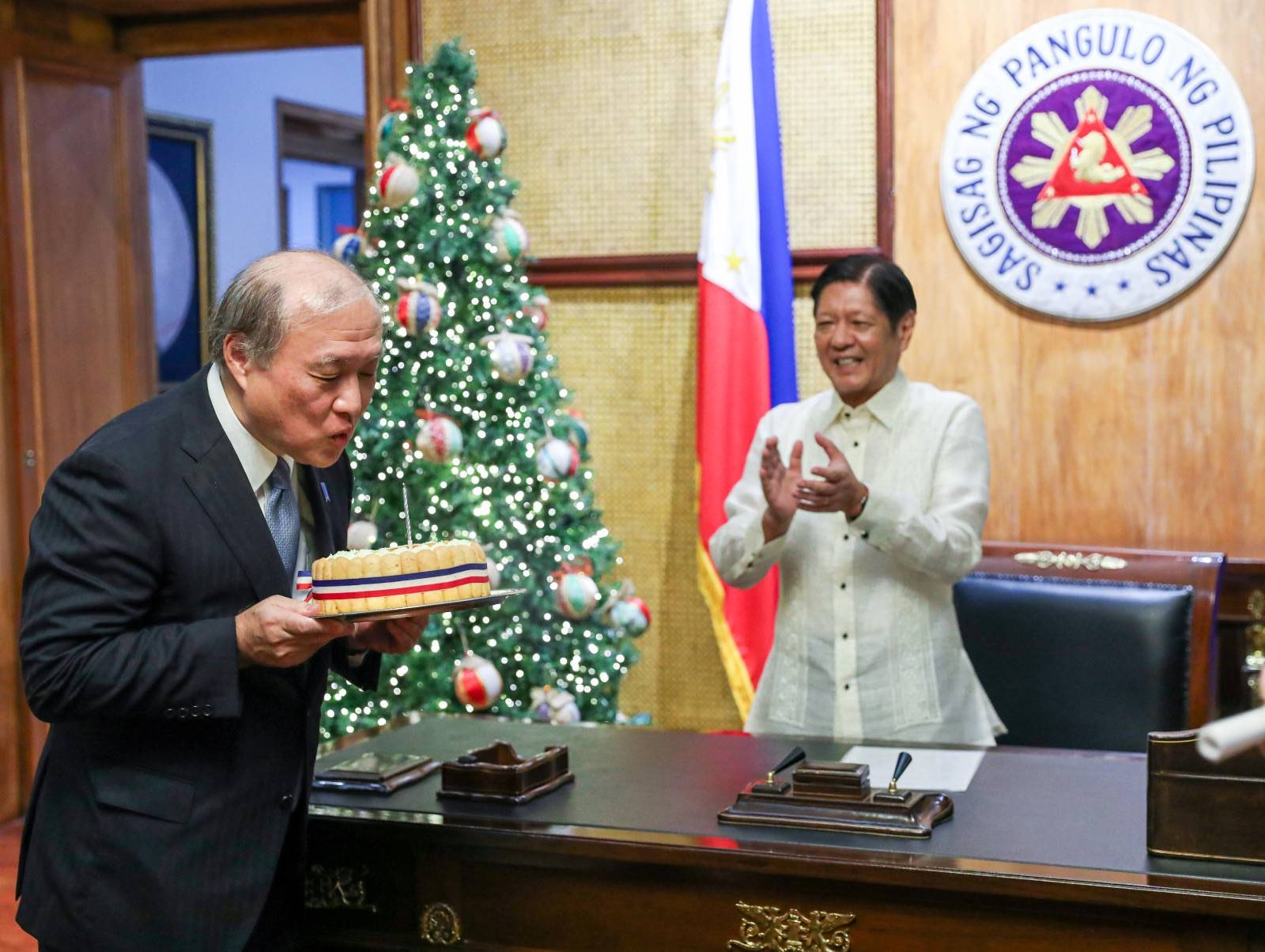
Akiba celebrates his 66th birthday with Philippine President Bongbong Marcos in Manila on 19 December 2024

Takeo Akiba was born on 19 December 1958, in Kawasaki, Kanagawa Prefecture, but he grew up in Yokohama. Through junior and senior high school, Akiba attended Eiko Gakuen, where he was part of the soccer team. He later studied law at the University of Tokyo and joined the Ministry of Foreign Affairs after graduating in 1982.

Akiba was sent to receive English language training at the Fletcher School at Tufts University in the United States. As a diplomat Akiba held foreign postings in the embassy to the United States besides internal service as the Ministry mainly with the Treaty Bureau and the Minister's Secretariat. His appointment as chief of the China division in the Asian and Oceanian Affairs Bureau in 2007 was seen as snub to the "China School" of the ministry. Akiba was considered to represent a hard line towards China. He later served as political minister at the embassy to the United States and as senior counsellor in the Minister's Secretariat.

Akiba was appointed chief of the International Legal Affairs Bureau in July 2014, and chief of the Foreign Policy Bureau in October of the following year. He was promoted to deputy foreign minister for political affairs (外務審議官, Gaimu Shingikan) in June 2016. In January 2018, he was made administrative vice minister for foreign affairs. Akiba was deeply trusted by Prime Minister Shinzo Abe and Chief Cabinet Secretary Yoshihide Suga, and played a central role in formulating and promoting the concept of the Free and Open Indo-Pacific.

Akiba retired from the ministry in June 2021, but on the following month he was appointed national security advisor to the Cabinet and secretary general of the National Security Secretariat by Yoshihide Suga, who had succeeded Abe as prime minister. Akiba remained when Fumio Kishida succeeded Suga.

Akiba was replaced in January 2025, but remains a special advisor to the Cabinet.

Government offices
Preceded by Shinsuke Sugiyama	Administrative Vice Minister for Foreign Affairs; 2018–2021	Succeeded by Takeo Mori
Preceded by Shigeru Kitamura	National Security Advisor to the Cabinet; 2021–2025	Succeeded by Masataka Okano
