= National Intelligence Council (Japan) =

Japanese government intelligence coordination body

- 国家情報会議; Kokka Jōhō Kaigi

Agency overview
- Formed: July 31, 2026
- Preceding agency: Cabinet Intelligence Council
- Agency executive: Prime Minister Sanae Takaichi, Chairman
- Parent agency: Cabinet of Japan

The National Intelligence Council (Japanese: 国家情報会議, Hepburn: Kokka Jōhō Kaigi) (NIC) is the principal forum used by the prime minister and Cabinet of Japan to coordinate and deliberate on intelligence policies for Japan. It governs the National Intelligence Bureau. The NIC's establishment has raised concerns of potential privacy violations and accusations of reviving militarism from various lawyers' associations.

== History ==
In October 2025, the Liberal Democratic Party and the Japan Innovation Party established a coalition agreement, with one of the clauses stating that the parties would introduce legislation to replace the Cabinet Intelligence Council with the NIC during the National Diet session of 2026. On 9 December 2025, considerations were raised to create a new ministerial post for intelligence-related matters. During that time, it was also announced that the Cabinet Intelligence Committee will be revamped into the NIC.

On 13 March 2026, the National Intelligence Council Establishment Act was filed in the House of Representatives. On 23 April 2026, the House of Representatives passed the National Intelligence Council Establishment Act. Komeito posted an article on its website, which raised concern on how much information the NIC will allow to be collected for intelligence purposes. The Constitutional Democratic Party of Japan submitted an amendment on May 26, 2026 to consider having a third-party organization to audit the NIC after the bill was passed for privacy violations, but it was rejected. At the same day, Hideya Sugio of the Constitutional Democratic Party of Japan asked about the separation of the NIC and the Japanese National Security Council and overlapping ministers in both councils. Prime Minister Takaichi explained during a House of Councillors Cabinet Committee meeting that the NIC would promote objective analysis and evaluate intelligence when she answered questions raised by Sugio regarding its role.

On 27 May 2026, the House of Councillors passed the law; the Liberal Democratic Party. the Japan Innovation Party, the Democratic Party for the People, Komeito, Sanseitō, the Conservative Party of Japan, and Team Mirai supported the bill, while the Constitutional Democratic Party of Japan, the Japanese Communist Party, Reiwa Shinsengumi, and the Social Democratic Party voted against it. During the prime minister's press conference, she stated that the act to establish the NIC does not violate any privacy nor increase the risk of such activities taking place. The press conference also indicated that Japanese intelligence capabilities are being strengthened to deal with events "in an increasingly complex and severe international environment."

On 28 May 2026, the Chinese Ministry of Foreign Affairs spokeswoman Mao Ning stated to reporters in a press conference that Japan should learn from history in response to the bill being passed. Ning stated that such intelligence agencies paved the way for militarism.

On 13 June 2026, Shigeru Kitamura participated in a talk on information cooperation between Japan and South Korea in relation to threats from North Korea, organized by the Korean National Intelligence Society. Kitamura stated that the NIC and the NIB should not be seen as a sign of militarism and while it is important to learn from the past, it is also important to deal with crises with regards to North Korea's ballistic and nuclear missiles programs.

The council held its first meeting on 31 July 2026. Chief Cabinet Secretary Minoru Kihara stated that the NIC would mark the first step in intelligence reforms.

In response to the NIC being established, Japan Federation of Bar Association (JFBA) Chairman Junichi Matsuda issued a letter published online. He raised concerns and said that while intelligence capabilities should be maintained, he criticized privacy violations committed by the Japanese intelligence community, and called for third-party organizations to be involved in audits to ensure that the NIC does not commit human rights violations.

On August 5, 2026, the Hiroshima Bar Association released an online letter by Masato Furukawa. He called on the government to repeal the National Intelligence Council Establishment Act due to concerns of privacy violations, a lack of mechanisms to judge the activities of the NIC and the NIB, the presence of other laws instead of a proposed anti-espionage law such as the National Public Service Act and the Unfair Competition Prevention Act and potentially leading Japan to a conflict where it has no interest in.

== Organization ==
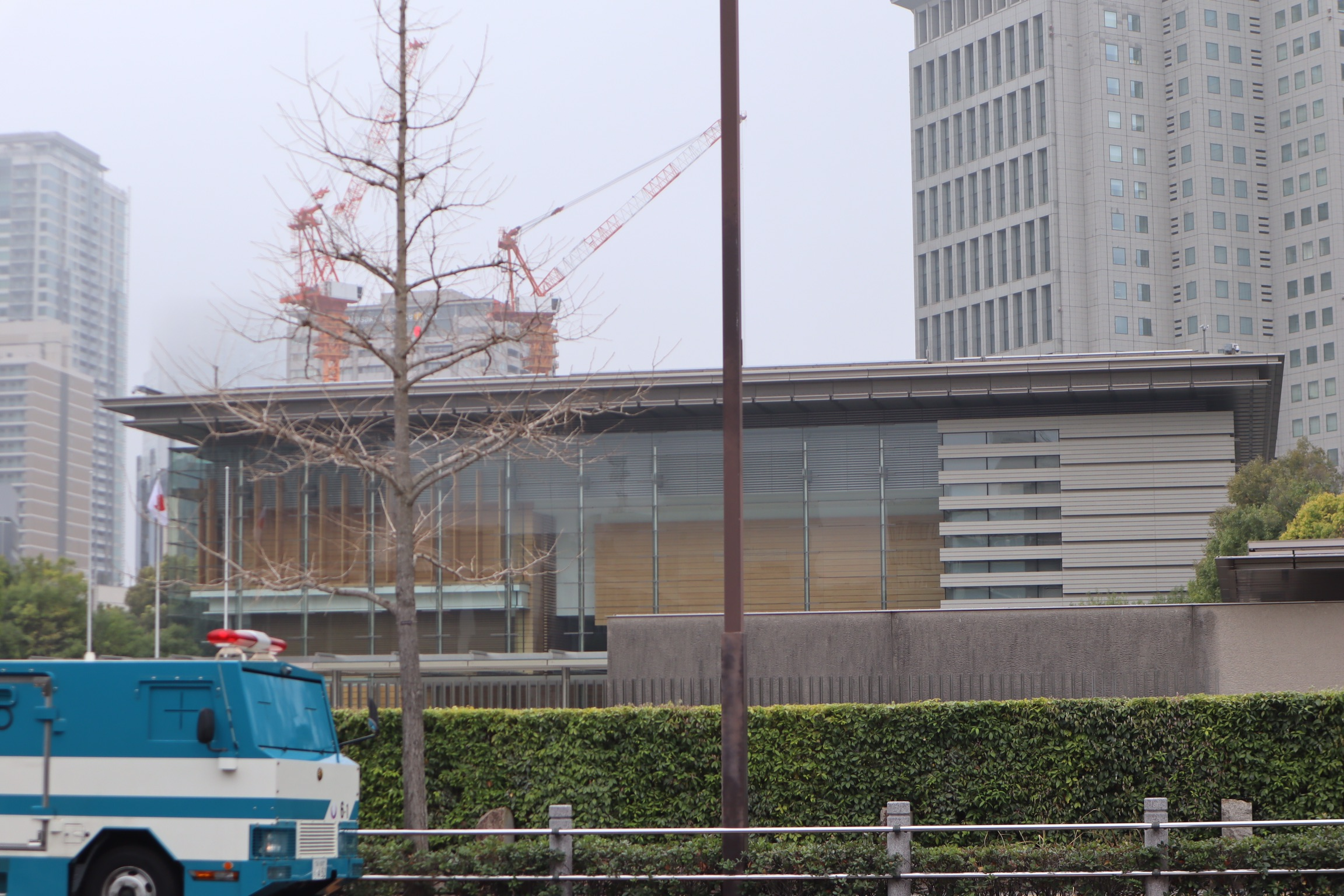
The NIC is located in the Prime Minister's residence.

The NIC is headed by the prime minister of Japan. The following ministers are also included in the NIC with the prime minister:

- Chief Cabinet Secretary
- Minister of State for Financial Services
- Chair of the National Public Safety Commission
- Minister of Justice
- Minister of Defense
- Minister for Foreign Affairs
- Minister of Finance
- Minister of Economy, Trade and Industry
- Minister of Land, Infrastructure, Transport and Tourism

The NIC is seated in the Japanese Cabinet Secretariat.

According to Goto Yuichi of the Centrist Reform Alliance, the membership of the NIC and NSC are similar. The issue raised concerns for overlapping between policymaking and curating intelligence, which can lead to intelligence being shaped to preferred conclusions instead of being used to confront the issue of the day. Professor Takatoshi Oyama mentioned the issue played out before when CIRO used a public opinion survey they made in 1991 for having JMSDF minesweepers sent to the Persian Gulf with the question being framed under "international contribution" to the public, which persuaded the then Prime Minister Toshiki Kaifu to agree to the deployment.

== Functions ==
The council governs the National Intelligence Bureau. The NIC is expected to meet once every six months.

According to analysis from the International Institute for Strategic Studies by Robert Ward and Laurence Stobart, the NIC would be an equal rank in terms of function to the Japanese National Security Council. They also mention that the NIC has "the ability to decide intelligence issues and strategy for the first time in the post-war period." The structure would also the NIB to address intelligence requirements from the NIC. They mention that the NIB may not be able to address the problem of a "lack of horizontal information flow between intelligence-gathering agencies of the same rank". Sanshiro Hosaka, a research fellow at the International Centre for Defence and Security, stated that the NIB and the NIC would improve Japan's intelligence abilities by "strengthening coordination, reducing interagency barriers and ensuring that intelligence products better meet policymakers’ requirements".

Yoshiki Kobayashi stated that the NIC's daily functions would be the equivalent of the National Intelligence Priorities Framework.
