= National Intelligence Bureau (Japan) =

Intelligence agency of Japan

- 国家情報局; Kokka Jōhō-kyoku
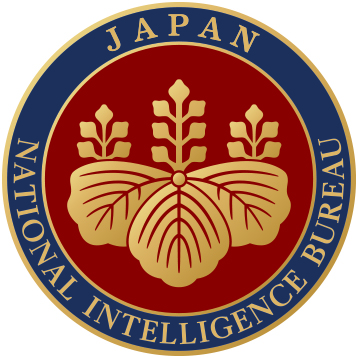

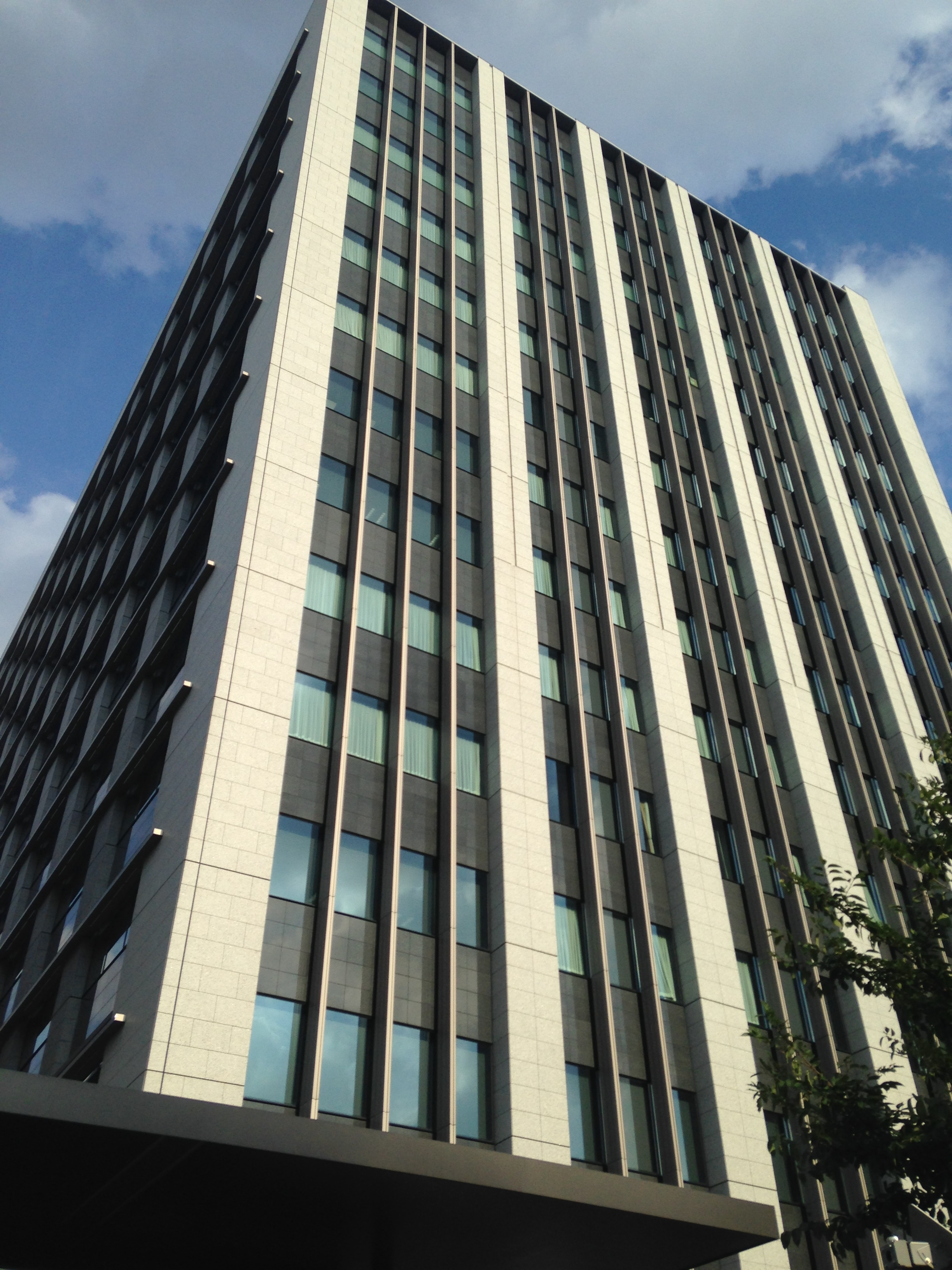
- Central Government Building No. 8, where the National Intelligence Bureau is located

Agency overview
- Formed: 31 July 2026
- Preceding agency: Cabinet Intelligence and Research Office
- Jurisdiction: Government of Japan
- Headquarters: Tokyo, Japan
- Employees: 730
- Agency executives: Kazuya Hara, Director-General; Hiroyuki Matsuo, Deputy Director
- Parent agency: National Intelligence Council
- Website: www.cas.go.jp/jp/gaiyou/jimu/nic_nib.html

The National Intelligence Bureau (Japanese: 国家情報局, Hepburn: Kokka Jōhō-kyoku; abbr. NIB), with some translations in English as the National Intelligence Agency, is an intelligence agency of the government of Japan. The bureau is governed by the National Intelligence Council, headed by the prime minister. It was established on 31 July 2026, following the passage of the National Intelligence Council Establishment Act in the Diet. The NIB replaces the Cabinet Intelligence and Research Office as the primary intelligence agency, integrating its personnel.

== History ==
In October 2025, the Liberal Democratic Party and the Japan Innovation Party established a coalition agreement, with one of the clauses stating that the parties would introduce legislation to upgrade CIRO into a National Intelligence Bureau during the National Diet session of 2026. On 9 December 2025, considerations were raised to create a new ministerial post for intelligence-related matters. During that time, it was also announced that the Cabinet Intelligence Committee will be revamped into the NIC.

On 12 February 2026, Chief Cabinet Secretary Minoru Kihara stated that a National Intelligence Strategy will be drafted with plans to establish the NIB being drawn up. Takayuki Kobayashi, who chairs the ruling Liberal Democratic Party's Headquarters for Intelligence Strategy and the Policy Research Council, stated that strengthening Japanese intelligence capabilities and establishing a system enabling independent strategic decision-making is urgent after his meeting with the prime minister in March 2026. The draft stated that the agency should be headed by a parliamentary vice minister.

On 13 March 2026, the National Intelligence Council Establishment Act was filed in the House of Representatives. On 23 April 2026, the House of Representatives passed the bill. On 12 May 2026, the House of Councillors deliberated on the bill with Chief Cabinet Secretary Minoru Kihara explaining the bill's purpose to lawmakers. On May 26 2026, the prime minister stated discussions will be conducted on measures that would be taken to ensure the NIB does not conduct activities that violate privacy laws or political neutrality.

On 27 May 2026, the House of Councillors passed the law; the Liberal Democratic Party. the Japan Innovation Party, the Democratic Party for the People, Komeito, Sanseitō, the Conservative Party of Japan and Team Mirai supported the bill, while the Constitutional Democratic Party of Japan, the Japanese Communist Party, Reiwa Shinsengumi and the Social Democratic Party voted against it. Lawmakers in the Diet raised the issue of having the NIB led by someone who is appointed from another ministry or agency. This issue was also raised by researcher Mikio Haruna, who remarked that having the National Police Agency (NPA) in charge of the NIB instead of having an analytical body in charge would undermine the bureau's mandate.

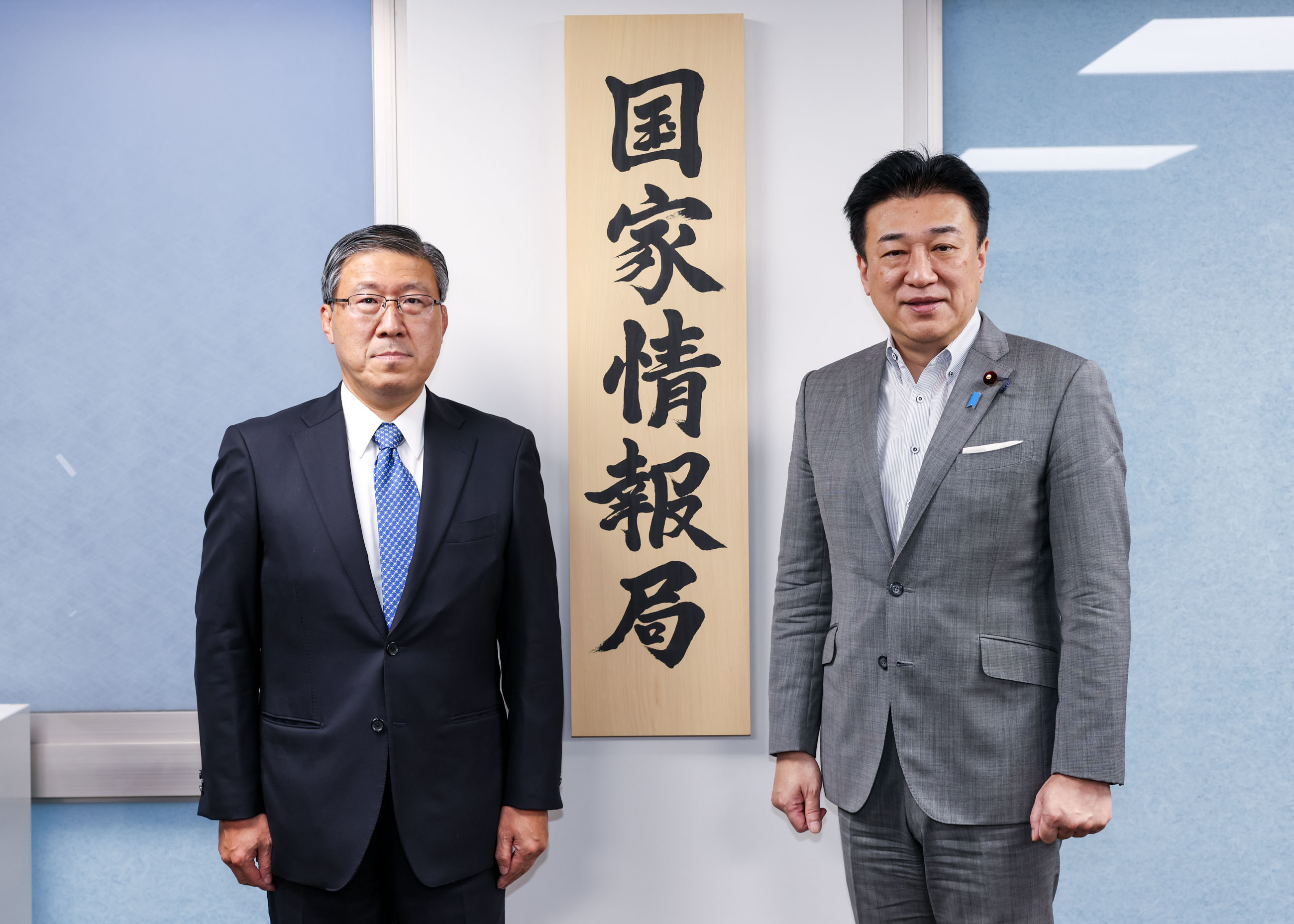
NIB Director Kazuya Hara (left) and Chief Cabinet Secretary Minoru Kihara (right) with the unveiled NIB sign on July 31, 2026.

On 24 July 2026, Kazuya Hara was appointed to serve as the first director-general of the NIB, who was the last director of CIRO. The NIB was officially established on 31 July 2026. On the same day, Hiroyuki Matsuo was appointed to be the NIB's Deputy Director, who previously served as the deputy head of mission at the Japanese Embassy in South Korea.

It was reported, after the establishment of the NIB, that a separate foreign intelligence agency will be created by fiscal year 2027. This would be done in conjunction with creating an anti-espionage law.

After the NIB was established, Tetsufumi Hirai of the Japan Lawyers Association for Freedom stated that citizen's freedoms will be severely restricted and Japan will be forced to enter a conflict. Mizuho Fukushima, an opposition lawmaker from the SDP mentioned that not having an intelligence agency like the NIB was a choice made for "Japan’s commitment to being a peaceful nation that renounces war, and the result of lessons learned from its own history". Fukushima mnetioned that the NIB would lead Japan to be a surveillance state.

On 13 July 2026, a report from a Jiji opinion poll taken after the legislation passed found 19 percent of respondents opposed it. Around 40 percent indifferent and the remainder was supportive of the law. This indicates a generation shift on how Japanese approached national security matters.

On 1 August 2026, an expert panel is planned to be created by September 2026 to deliberate on formulating the National Intelligence Strategy.

=== Reactions ===
While the US has not said anything about the NIB's establishment, China has been critical on it. Xinhua News Agency stated on June 5, 2026, stated that creating the NIB "revives the logic of pre-war militarist surveillance, aiming to manipulate domestic public opinion and support expanded military adventurism abroad". CGTN has stated that the decision to establish the body on July 31 evoked memories of Imperial Japan's notorious bacterial warfare facility Unit 731.

According to Professor Ken Kotani of the College of Risk Management at Nihon University, the establishment of the NIB was welcomed by Japan's allies. The Japan Times criticized the government for ignoring fears of government overreach and not addressing historical associations with the prewar Special Higher Police.

== Functions ==
The NIB succeeds CIRO as the primary intelligence agency in the Japanese intelligence community. Unlike the NIB, the CIRO had limited intelligence powers and legal authority to make other agencies cooperate by providing timely intelligence; CIRO also ran into difficulties to recruit and retain personnel. CIRO's analytical capacity has not been changed to keep up with the times. The CIRO, alongside the Public Security Intelligence Agency, the Defense Intelligence Headquarters, the Intelligence and Analysis Service and the National Police Agency Security Bureau, are the primary agencies that comprise the Japanese intelligence community. The community was known to have bureuacratic silos, leading to communication issues with each other. This has led to a fragmented intelligence system. The system meant that cooperation with the various agencies was seen as the only way to gain consensus. CIRO has been deemed a supplementary agency in the community instead of being a leading agency. Haruna also stated that CIRO's meetings with the other intelligence agency representatives through forums such as the Joint Intelligence Committee and the Cabinet Intelligence Council were inadequate.

According to an anonymous source in CIRO, there was an urgent need to consolidate intelligence in the Cabinet Secretariat in order to produce more comprehensive intelligence analysis for officials. The source also mentioned that the NIB would "be on par with the NSC and be able to request intelligence from ministries and agencies across the intelligence community from a higher level in the administrative hierarchy".

Prime Minister Sanae Takaichi's cabinet approved the establishment of the bureau because of the Chinese and Russian threat; the new agency was described as "a pillar of Prime Minister Sanae Takaichi’s efforts to shed restrictions on defense and security imposed on Japan after the war". Bloomberg News cited cybersecurity threats against Japan as another reason why it is being established.

The agency will not operate like the Central Intelligence Agency (CIA) and similar external intelligence agencies. Instead, the NIB will act in roles similarly conducted by the Director of National Intelligence (DNI). The New York Times reported that Tokyo sought advice from the US, Australia and Germany while the NIB was being established. Tokyo refused to make contents on the assistance being sought out to foreign partners. The NIB's Director-General will have a rank equal to a parliamentary vice minister.

It marks the consolidation of the management of information provided by various intelligence agencies linked to the National Police Agency and government ministries under a single government body. Its scope includes counterterrorism, national emergency response, and countermeasures against foreign intelligence such as espionage activity or covert influence operations in Japan. The NIB also marks part of Takaichi's willingness to depend less on the US on security matters.

Richard Samuels of MIT mentioned the concern raised by opposition lawmakers for building safeguards so that the NIB can conduct intelligence gathering without violating privacy rights, political neutrality and have mechanisms that are going to be used to review intelligence activities after they occur. The concerns were due to fear that the NIB can have unchecked powers similar to Tokko in running intelligence operations. Other lawmakers have stated that the NIB is countering the country's pacifist ideals established after World War II. Chief Cabinet Secretary Kihara responded to the concerns by stating that monitoring public protests are not in NIB's mandate and they will not be investigated.

Sanshiro Hosaka, a research fellow at the International Centre for Defence and Security, stated that the NIB and the NIC would improve Japan's intelligence abilities by "strengthening coordination, reducing interagency barriers and ensuring that intelligence products better meet policymakers’ requirements".

== Organization ==
The NIB is governed by the National Intelligence Council, which is headed by the prime minister of Japan and includes other ministerial officials from the cabinet. At its foundation, it was comprised around 730 staff. Previously, it was reported that 700 persons would be on NIB's staff.

The bureau is reported to have an operational budget of $407 million, which is expected to run at full strength by December 2026. For recruitment, various Japanese media outlets reported that the bureau will also hold exams to screen prospective recruits from 2027. Personnel exchanges with the private sector will also be conducted. Specialists, including those trained on artificial intelligence and software engineers, will be recruited to the NIB. According to the Japan Times, an unnamed organization will be used to train prospective recruits to the NIB. Professor Kotani said the necessity to recruit those who are not "in favor of any specific ministry or agency."

According to analysis from the International Institute for Strategic Studies by Robert Ward and Laurence Stobart, the NIB would rank equally with the Japanese National Security Council's National Security Secretariat (NSS). They mention that the NIB may not be able to address the problem of a "lack of horizontal information flow between intelligence-gathering agencies of the same rank". Samuels also stated that this problem is not unique to Japan as the global intelligence community also have encounters with siloing.
