= Masataka Okano =

Japanese diplomat (born 1964)

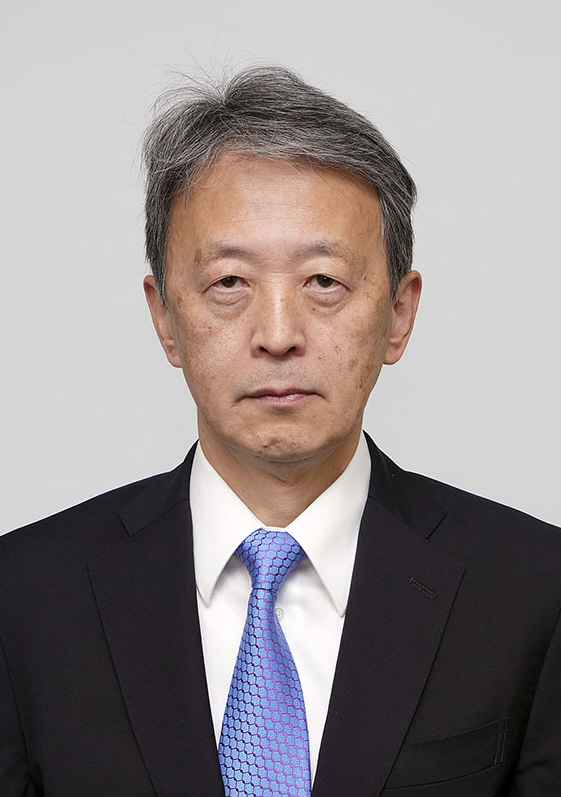
Official portrait, 2025

Masataka Okano (岡野 正敬, Okano Masataka, born 15 June 1964) is a Japanese diplomat who served as National Security Advisor to the Cabinet in 2025. He previously served as administrative vice minister for foreign affairs from 2023 to 2025.

== Biography ==
Masataka Okano was born in Kyoto Prefecture on 15 June 1964. He studied law at the University of Tokyo, graduated in 1987 and joined the Ministry of Foreign Affairs. After joining, he was sent to France for language training and studied at the École nationale d'administration.

During his diplomatic career, Okano has been posted to France, China and the United States, and has served as chief of the Russia division and the legal affairs divion in the Ministry. Okano was appointed chief of the International Legal Affairs Bureau in July 2019, and chief of the Foreign Policy Bureau in June 2021. In September 2022, he was appointed Assistant Chief Cabinet Secretary for foreign affairs at the Cabinet Secretariat, concurrently serving as deputy secretary general of the National Security Secretariat under Takeo Akiba.

Okano was appointed administrative vice minister for foreign affairs in August 2023, the senior position for a bureaucrat at the ministry. In January 2025, Okano succeeded Akiba as National Security Advisor to the Cabinet and Secretary General of the National Security Secretariat.

Okano was replaced when Prime Minister Sanae Takaichi took office in October 2025.

Government offices
Preceded by Shigeki Takizaki	Assistant Chief Cabinet Secretary (Foreign Affairs); 2022–2023	Succeeded by Keiichi Ichikawa
Preceded by Takeo Mori	Administrative Vice Minister for Foreign Affairs; 2023–2025	Succeeded by Takehiro Funakoshi
Preceded by Takeo Akiba	National Security Advisor to the Cabinet; 2025	Succeeded by Keiichi Ichikawa
