= Tsuruoka (name) =

Tsuruoka is a surname. Notable people with the name include:

- Masami Tsuruoka
- Koji Tsuruoka
- Kazuto Tsuruoka
- Kentaro Tsuruoka
