= Government of Japan Standard Terms of Use =

- Author: Cabinet Secretariat
- Latest version: 2.0
- Published: December 24, 2015; 10 years ago
- Copyleft: No

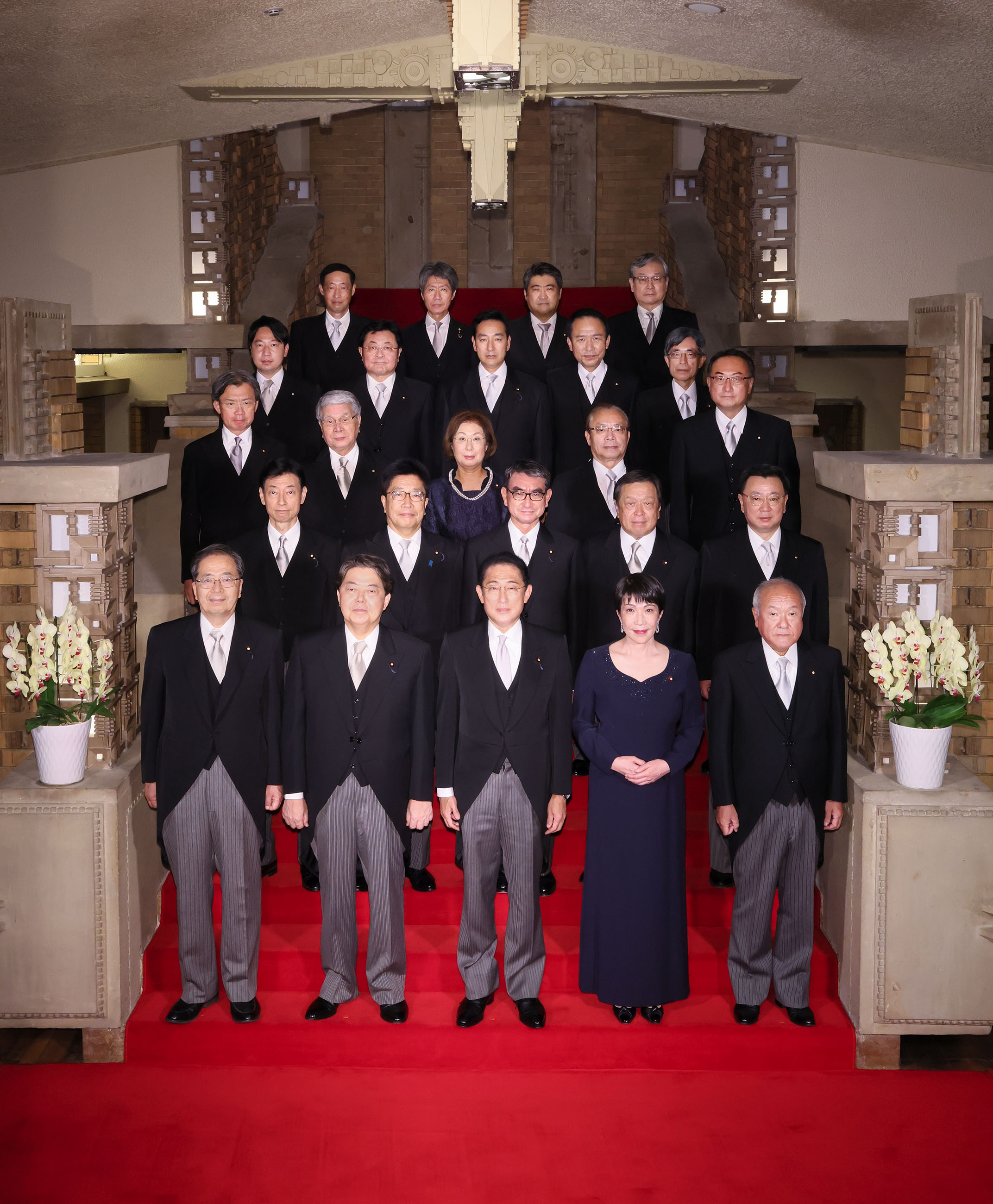
An example of an image that is licensed under the Standard Terms of Use.

The Government of Japan Standard Terms of Use (Japanese: 政府標準利用規約, Hepburn: Seifu Hyōjun Riyō Kiyaku) is a terms of use agreement for the content published online by Japanese government cabinet ministry websites. It was created in 2014. It allows the contents of cabinet ministry websites to be freely used, copied, publicly transmitted or otherwise modified, except when restricted by laws and ordinances. Version 1.0 of the terms of use agreement was created by the National Strategy office of Information and Communication Technology, Cabinet Secretariat (Japanese: 内閣官房情報通信技術総合戦略室, Hepburn: Naikaku-kanbō Jōhō Tsūshin Gijutsu Sōgō Senryaku-shitsu) in 2014 to promote the reuse of government website content.

Version 2.0 of the agreement was created in December 2015 and went into use starting in January 2016. Version 2.0 and later versions are compatible with the Creative Commons Attribution 4.0 International license (CC BY 4.0).

== History ==
- June 19, 2014 - Version 1.0 of the license was created.
- December 24, 2015 - Version 2.0 of the license was created.
- January 2016 - Version 2.0 of the license went into effect.

== Version history ==
=== Version 1.0 ===
When using content that is licensed under version 1.0, the user must comply with the following provisions:

- Provide references to the original work (attribution).
- When using third party content (content not produced by the Government), it is the responsibility of the user to obtain consent to use the content.
- Usage that violates Japanese laws and ordinances is prohibited.
- Usage that represent threats to the safety of the Nation and/or the citizens is prohibited.

=== Version 1.1 ===
This version was created to apply to content produced by local governments. The only difference between the local government version and the National government version is that the expression "national government" (Japanese: 国, Hepburn: Kuni) is changed to "publisher" (Japanese: 公表者, Hepburn: Kōhyō-sha). The terms of use were not changed from version 1.0.

=== Version 2.0 ===
In this version, the provisions in the terms of use that prohibited use in violation of laws and ordinances or the public order were deleted. This was done to ensure compatibility with the CC BY 4.0 license.

== Evaluation ==
The Japanese Open Knowledge Foundation said upon the release of version 1.0: "Making the content published by the websites of ministries freely available is a big step, but there are still concerns about the provisions that reference 'the public order', and international consistency". Kenji Hiramoto, an aide to the Japanese Government Chief Information Officer remarked that he is aware of this issue, but said "The important thing is to begin working on the government's open data".
