= Shotaro Yachi =

Japanese diplomat and scholar

- 谷内 正太郎
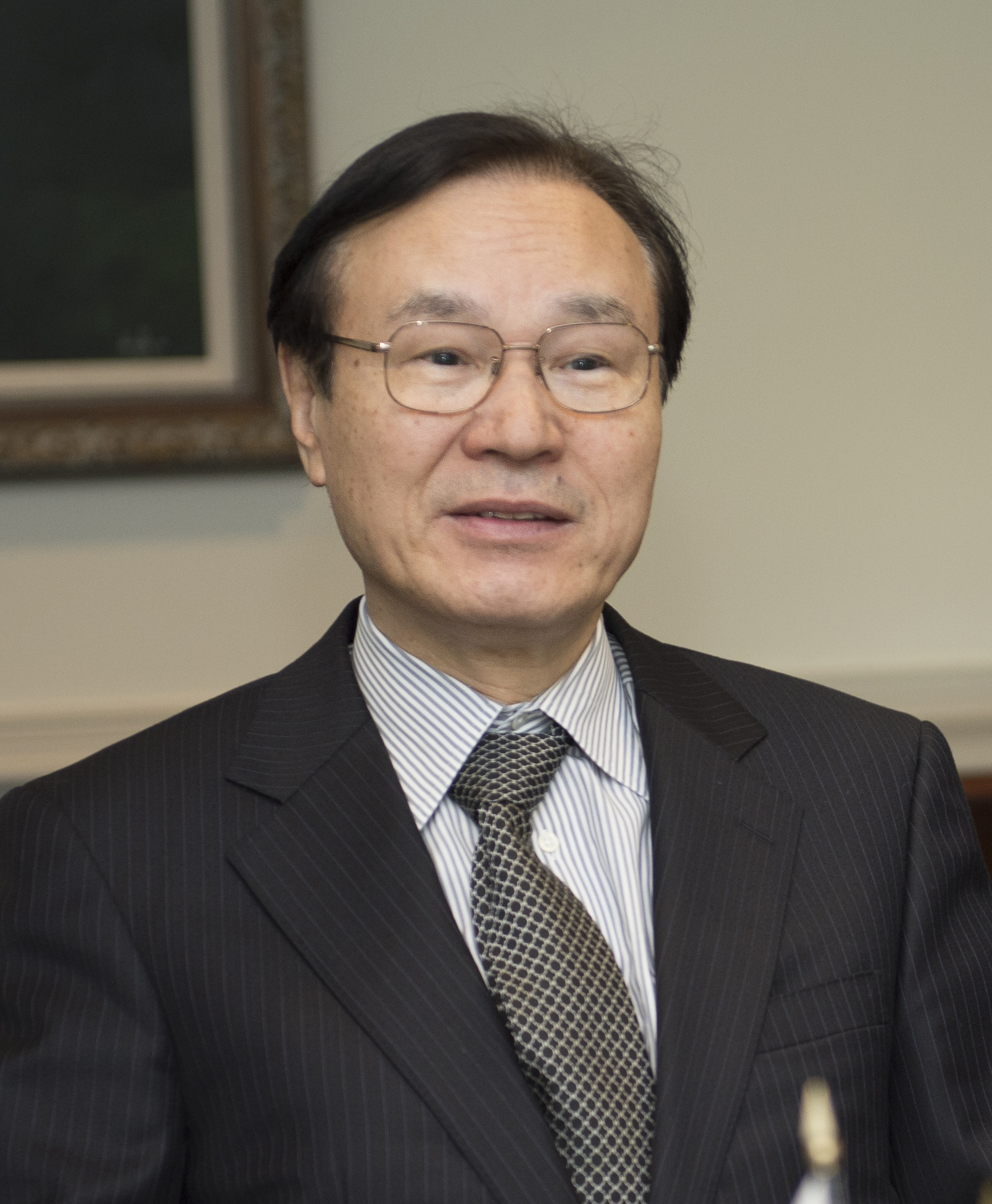
- Shotaro Yachi in 2014

Secretary General of the National Security Secretariat
- In office 2013 – 13 September 2019
- Prime Minister: Shinzo Abe
- Preceded by: Office established
- Succeeded by: Shigeru Kitamura

Personal details
- Born: 6 January 1944 (age 82) Kanazawa, Japan
- Education: University of Tokyo

Shotaro Yachi (谷内 正太郎, Yachi Shōtarō; born 6 January 1944) is a Japanese diplomat and scholar who served as the National Security Advisor from 2013 to 2019. He became the first national security advisor when the National Security Council was founded in December 2013. He previously served as administrative vice minister for foreign affairs from 2005 to 2008.

== Early life and education ==
Shotaro Yachi was born on 6 January 1944 in Kanazawa and was raised in Toyama.

Yachi received his master's degree at the University of Tokyo Graduate School for Law and Politics in 1969.

== Career ==
Yachi was a self-described outlier in the risk-averse Ministry of Foreign Affairs. He was influenced by Wakaizumi Kei, an international politics thinker who acted as Prime Minister Eisaku Sato's emissary for the negotiation of secret protocols allowing the US to introduce or station nuclear weapons in Japanese territory. According to an author, Yachi has engaged extensively in secret diplomacy under Abe.

Yachi entered the Ministry of Foreign Affairs at that time, retiring in 2008. His service in the Foreign Ministry included work in the Asian Affairs Bureau, the Treaties Bureau, the North American Affairs Bureau, and the Japanese delegations to the Philippines, the European Community, and the United States. He served as Vice-Minister for Foreign Affairs from 2005 to 2008.

Yachi was a foreign policy advisor to Shinzo Abe in Abe's 2006–2007 stint as Prime Minister. When Abe became Prime Minister again in late 2012, he selected Yachi to be a special advisor to his cabinet. He was appointed the first head of the NSC upon its creation in December 2013.

One of Yachi's first tasks as National Security Advisor was to strengthen the new NSC's relations with the American government. He met with his American counterpart, Susan Rice, as well as cabinet secretaries Chuck Hagel and John Kerry. On 28 April 2015, he was among the guests invited to the state dinner hosted by U.S. President Barack Obama in Abe’s honor at the White House.

Yachi has taught at Waseda University, Sophia University, Seinan Gakuin University, Keio University, and Chuo University. From June 2012 to December 2013, he was a director for the Fujitsu corporation.

Government offices
Preceded by Kazuyoshi Urabe	Assistant Chief Cabinet Secretary (Foreign Affairs); 2002–2005	Succeeded by Shin Ebihara
Preceded by Yukio Takeuchi	Administrative Vice Minister for Foreign Affairs; 2005–2008	Succeeded by Mitoji Yabunaka
New title Office established	National Security Advisor to the Cabinet; 2013–2019	Succeeded by Shigeru Kitamura
