= Koji Tsuruoka =

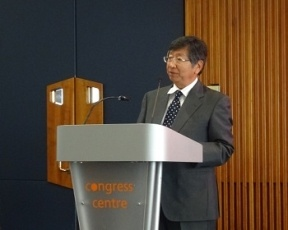

Ambassador of Japan to the United Kingdom
- In office 7 April 2016 – 15 October 2019
- Prime Minister: Shinzo Abe
- Preceded by: Keiichi Hayashi
- Succeeded by: Yasumasa Nagamine

Personal details
- Born: 10 August 1952 (age 73)

Koji Tsuruoka (鶴岡 公二, Tsuruoka Koji; born 10 August 1952) is a Japanese diplomat. He served as the Japanese ambassador to the United Kingdom from 2016 to 2019.

== Biography ==
Tsuruoka was born 10 August 1952. His father was a Japanese diplomat who served as Ambassador to the United Nations. He received a BA in Law from the University of Tokyo and an LLM from Harvard Law School. He joined the Japanese Ministry of Foreign Affairs in 1976.

He served as the first Director-General for Global Issues from 2006 to 2008. He then worked in the International Legal Affairs Bureau until 2010. He was Deputy Vice Minister for Foreign Policy from 2010 to 2012 and then Deputy Minister for Foreign Affairs from 2012 to 2013. In 2013, he was appointed chief negotiator to represent Japan in the Trans-Pacific Partnership negotiations.

Diplomatic posts
| Preceded by Keiichi Hayashi | Ambassador of Japan to the United Kingdom; 2016–2019 | Succeeded by Yasumasa Nagamine |
