= National security advisor =

A national security advisor serves as the chief advisor to a national government on matters of security. The advisor is not usually a member of the government's cabinet but is usually a member of various military or security councils.

== National security advisors by country ==
- National Security Advisor (Canada)
- National Security Advisor (India)
- National Security Advisor (Israel)
- National Security Advisor (Nigeria)
- National Security Advisor (Pakistan)
- National Security Adviser (United Kingdom)
- National Security Advisor (United States)
- National Security Advisor (Japan)
