= Keiichi Hayashi =

Japanese diplomat (born 1951)

Ambassador of Japan to the United Kingdom
- In office January 11, 2011 – June 6, 2016
- Monarch: Akihito
- Prime Minister: Naoto Kan; Yoshihiko Noda; Shinzō Abe
- Preceded by: Shin Ebihara
- Succeeded by: Koji Tsuruoka

Ambassador of Japan to Ireland
- In office 2005–2008
- Monarch: Akihito
- Prime Minister: Junichiro Koizumi; Shinzō Abe; Yasuo Fukuda; Tarō Asō
- Preceded by: Takeshi Kagami
- Succeeded by: Toshinao Urabe

Personal details
- Born: 8 February 1951 (age 75) Yamaguchi Prefecture, Japan
- Profession: Diplomat

Keiichi Hayashi (林 景一, Hayashi Keiichi; born 8 February 1951) is a Japanese diplomat. From 2011 to 2016, he served as the Japanese ambassador to the United Kingdom.

== Biography ==
Keiichi Hayashi was born on 8 February 1951 in Yamaguchi Prefecture.

In 1973, Hayashi stayed in Folkestone, in the UK, for three months to attend an English language school. One of his English teachers was the wife of a retired diplomat, and this encouraged him to pursue a career as a diplomat.

== Career ==
In 1974, Hayashi joined the Ministry of Foreign Affairs.

From 1996, Hayashi spent three years at the Embassy in London, first as a political counsellor, and then as a political minister.

He served as Japanese Ambassador to Ireland from 2005 to 2008.

He returned to the UK in 2010 as Minister Plenipotentiary to the UK.

On 11 January 2011, he was appointed Japanese ambassador to the United Kingdom.

Hayashi attended the wedding of Prince William and Catherine Middleton at Westminster Abbey in London on 29 April 2011, officially representing Japan in place of the Emperor and Empress of Japan, who had to decline following the Great East Japan earthquake of 11 March 2011.

Diplomatic posts
Preceded by Shin Ebihara	Ambassador of Japan to the United Kingdom; 2011-2016	Succeeded by Koji Tsuruoka
Preceded by Takeshi Kagami	Ambassador of Japan to Ireland; 2005-2008	Succeeded by Toshinao Urabe
