= Yukio Takeuchi =

Japanese judge (born 1943)

Yukio Takeuchi (竹内 行夫, Takeuchi Yukio; born 20 July 1943) is a Japanese diplomat and jurist who served as a justice of the Supreme Court of Japan from 2008 to 2013. Before his appointment to the court, he served as vice minister for foreign affairs from 2002 to 2005 and ambassador to Indonesia from 2001 to 2002.

Preceded by Yoshiji Nogami	Administrative Vice Minister for Foreign Affairs; 2002–2005	Succeeded by Shotaro Yachi
Preceded by Takao Kawakami	Japanese Ambassador to the Indonesia; 2001-2002	Succeeded by Yutaka Iimura
