= Cabinet Intelligence and Research Office =

Japanese intelligence agency under the Cabinet Secretariat

Cabinet Intelligence and Research Office (CIRO)
- 内閣情報調査室; Naikaku Jōhō Chōsashitsu (Naichō)
- Seal of the Cabinet Intelligence and Research Office

Agency overview
- Formed: 1986 (CIRO establishment)
- Preceding agencies: Research Office (1952); Cabinet Research Chamber/Cabinet Research Office (1957)
- Dissolved: 2026
- Superseding agency: National Intelligence Bureau
- Jurisdiction: Government of Japan
- Headquarters: Nagatacho, Tokyo, Japan
- Employees: 190
- Agency executive: Kazuya Hara, Director of Cabinet Intelligence
- Parent agency: Cabinet Secretariat
- Website: www.cas.go.jp/jp/gaiyou/jimu/jyouhoutyousa.html (in Japanese)

The Cabinet Intelligence and Research Office (内閣情報調査室, Naikaku Jōhō Chōsashitsu), also known as Naichō (内調), was the national civilian intelligence agency under the Japanese Cabinet Secretariat tasked with collecting and analyzing intelligence from around the world.

As a principal member of the Japanese intelligence community, the CIRO reported directly to the prime minister of Japan. Its operations are mandated through the Cabinet Law. The agency was said to be equivalent to the American Central Intelligence Agency (CIA). The CIRO frequently worked with the National Security Council (NSC) as a communication channel to the prime minister. On 31 July 2026. it was succeeded by the National Intelligence Bureau.

The CIRO was headquartered in Chiyoda, Tokyo, in a building called "H20".

== History ==
The CIRO was created through the formation of the Prime Ministers's Research Office (内閣総理大臣官房調査室, Naikakusōri Daijin Kanbō Chōsa-Shitsu) in April 1952 with Jun Murai as the first director in an attempt to replicate its structure after the CIA. But due to widespread opposition and the factionalism in the bureaucracy, this plan was discarded. The RO was placed under jurisdiction of the Prime Minister's office in 1957 and was known as the Cabinet Research Office (内閣調査室, Naikaku Chōsa-Shitsu). The CRO was later renamed as the CIRO in 1986.

The Cabinet Intensive Information Center was established on April 11, 1996 to ensure that the CIRO can inform the Prime Minister in case of severe emergencies. It is located in the Prime Minister's residence.

In August 2007, discussions of intelligence reforms through the paper Improvement of Counter-Intelligence Functions resulted in the establishment of the Counterintelligence Center. It has been suggested that the CIC can be used as the basis for the creation of an actual external intelligence agency similar to the CIA.

In 2013, CIRO satellite imagery analysis was used to assist NGOs in Tacloban for reconstruction work in the wake of Typhoon Haiyan.

Since 2015, CIRO agents are usually recruited to be sent to the International Counter-Terrorism Intelligence Collection Unit.

In 2016, the business magazine Facta reported that the government of Shinzo Abe had directed the CIRO to spy on a Japanese lawyer connected to David Kaye, who as U.N. special rapporteur on freedom of expression stated "deep and genuine concern" on declining media independence in Japan.

On January 12, 2024, Mitsubishi Heavy Industries and the Cabinet Satellite Intelligence Center announced that the launch of the Optical-8 satellite was a success, which separated from the missile and has entered orbit.

On October 24, 2025, it was reported that CIRO would be potentially restructured. This would call for upgrading the CIRO and the Director of Cabinet Intelligence (DCI) to the "National Intelligence Agency" and "Secretary General of the National Intelligence Agency". On May 12, 2026, CIRO director Kazuya Hara went to Washington, D.C. to meet with the FBI in collaborating to reform the agency. On May 27, 2026, legislation for reorganizing CIRO to the NIA was passed in the Diet. On 31 July 2026, the CIRO was succeeded by the National Intelligence Bureau.

=== Spy scandal ===
On January 17, 2008, an official of Naichō was charged for spying for Russians, passing them classified information. The Russians denied the claim.

== Organization ==
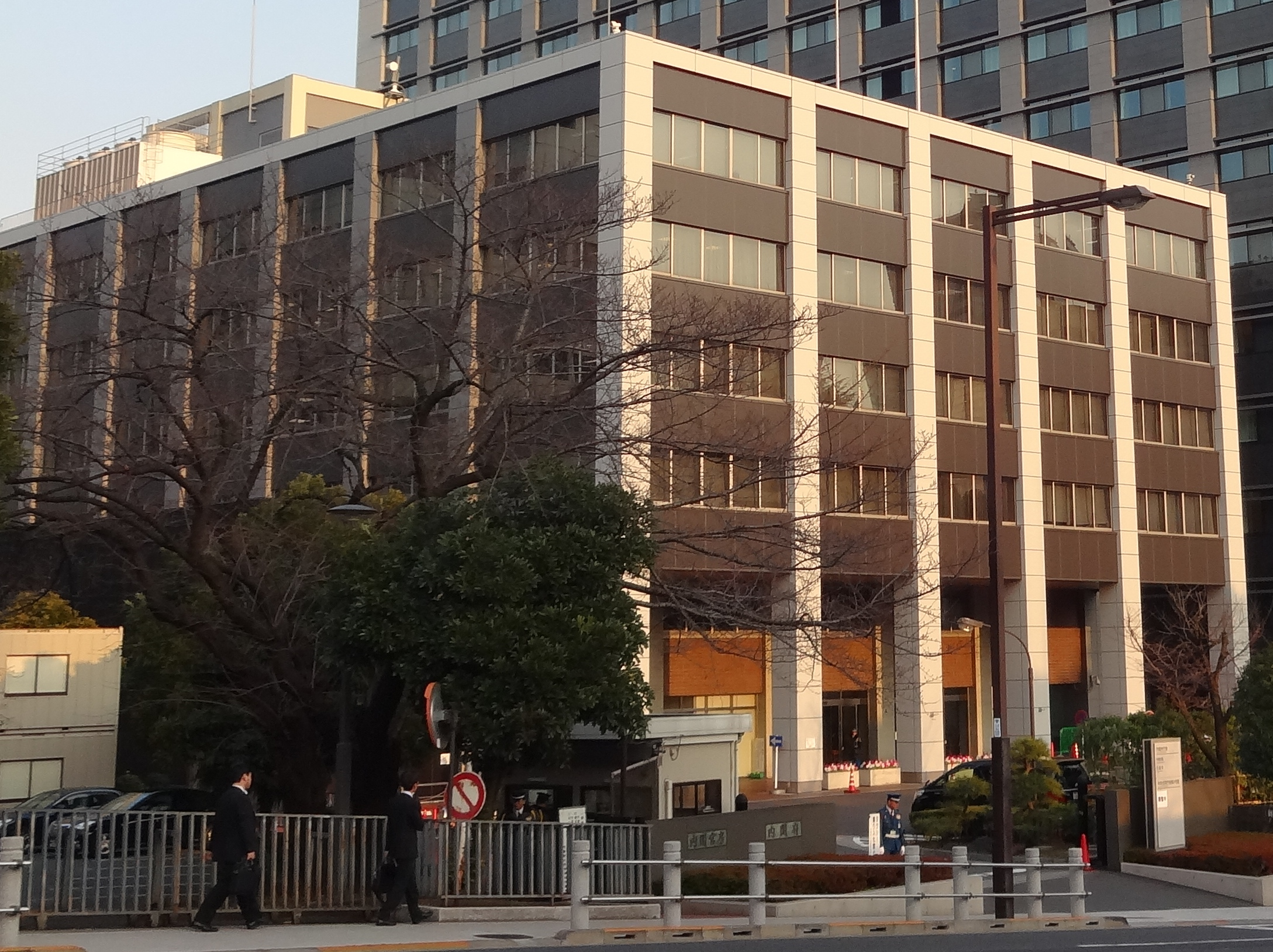
Naichō's headquarters are located on the 6th floor of the Cabinet Office Building

According to its official web site, the organization of Naichō was as follows:

- Director of Cabinet Intelligence (内閣情報官)
- Deputy Director of Cabinet Intelligence (次長)
- Cabinet Intelligence Officer
- Divisions:
  - Administration (総務部門): Had Human Resources, Budget and academic experts.
  - Home Affairs Division (国内部門): Collected information based on domestic media, including newspapers, magazines and from news broadcasts.
  - International Affairs Division (国際部門): Collected information based on foreign media and broadcasts from another country, including CIRO agents based overseas.
  - Economic Affairs Division (経済部門): Studied domestic/international economic information.
- Cabinet Intensive Information Center (内閣情報集約センター): Secured information and documents related to disasters and other emergencies. Staffed by twenty agents from the Ministry of Defense, National Police Agency, Fire Disaster and Management Agency and the Japan Coast Guard.
- Cabinet Intelligence Analysts (内閣情報分析官)
- Cabinet Satellite Intelligence Center (内閣衛星情報センター): Operated a network of surveillance satellites, such as the Information Gathering Satellite (IGS)-Optical and IGS-Radar series. As of June 2018, Japan has six functioning observation satellites in orbit. It was established in 2001 and has 320 personnel employed with at least 100 of them being imagery intelligence analysts. Tasked with obtaining and analyzing satellite imagery data. The Deputy Director position was filled by a senior officer from the NPA.
- Situation Center of Cabinet
- National Counterintelligence Center (カウンターインテリジェンスセンター): Coordinated government action based on the "Improvement of Counter-Intelligence Functions" policy.
- Cabinet Counter Terrorism Intelligence Coordination Center

=== Directors of Naichō ===
- Yoshio Omori (March 1993 - April 1997)
- Kazuhiro Sugita (January 2001 – April 2001)
- Toshinori Kanemoto (April 2001 – April 2006)
- Hideshi Mitani (April 2006 – April 2010)
- Shinichi Uematsu (April 2010 – December 2011)
- Shigeru Kitamura (December 2011 – September 2019)
- Hiroaki Takizawa (September 2019 – June 2023)
- Kazuya Hara (June 2023 – July 2026)

=== Manpower ===
Like most intelligence agencies in Japan, its personnel were usually recruited from other agencies. The top positions in CIRO occupied by career police officers.

The National Police Agency (NPA) sends around 180 personnel, followed by the Ministry of Defense (MOD) with 100 personnel, the Ministry of Foreign Affairs (MOFA) with 50 personnel, and the Public Security Intelligence Agency (PSIA) with 40 personnel.

== Bibliography ==
- Davies, Philip H.J.; Gustafson, Kristian, eds. (2013). Intelligence Elsewhere: Spies and Espionage Outside the Anglosphere. Georgetown University Press. ISBN 978-1589019560. OCLC 796354922.
- Dover, Robert; Goodman, Michael S.; Hillebrand, Claudia, eds. (2014). Routledge Companion to Intelligence Studies. New York: Routledge. ISBN 978-1589019560. OCLC 796354922.
- Samuels, Richard J. (2019). Special Duty: A History of the Japanese Intelligence Community. Ithaca, NY, and London: Cornell University Press. ISBN 978-1501741586. OCLC 1089840059.
