= Yoshiji Nogami =

Japanese diplomat (born 1942)

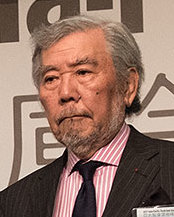
- Born: 19 June 1942 (age 83); Tokyo, Japan
- Education: University of Tokyo
- Occupation: Diplomat

Yoshiji Nogami (野上 義二, Nogami Yoshiji; born 19 June 1942) is a Japanese diplomat.

He joined the Japanese ministry of Foreign Affairs during the late 1960s. On January 30, 2002 he was dismissed from his position as Vice-Minister of Foreign Affairs following disagreement with Foreign Minister Makiko Tanaka over the participation of two NGOs in the conference regarding the reconstruction of Afghanistan, then held in Tokyo.

From 2002 to 2004, he served as Minister at the Japanese Embassy in the United Kingdom, and from 2004 to 2008 as Japanese Ambassador to the United Kingdom. In March 2019, Nogami spoke at the Tokyo forum on the question of whether Japan is sufficiently invested in South-east Asia. He said Japan's foreign direct investment in the region is already overtaking what it spends in China.

== See also ==
- 26th G8 summit: served as a sherpa (emissary).
- Chatham House

Diplomatic posts
Preceded by Masaki Orita	Ambassador to the United Kingdom; 2004-2008	Succeeded by Shin Ebihara
Preceded by Yutaka Kawashima	Administrative Vice Minister for Foreign Affairs; 2001-2002	Succeeded by Yukio Takeuchi
Preceded by Koichi Haraguchi	Deputy Foreign Minister for Economic Affairs; 1999-2001	Succeeded by Shōtarō Ōshima
