= Shigeru Kitamura =

Japanese official

- 北村滋
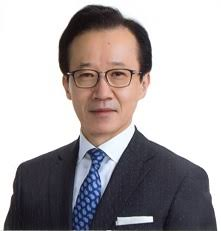
- Official portrait, 2019

Secretary General of the National Security Secretariat
- In office 13 September 2019 – 7 July 2021
- Prime Minister: Shinzo Abe; Yoshihide Suga
- Preceded by: Shotaro Yachi
- Succeeded by: Takeo Akiba

Director of Cabinet Intelligence
- In office 27 December 2011 – 11 September 2019
- Prime Minister: Yoshihiko Noda; Shinzo Abe
- Preceded by: Shin'ichi Uemastu
- Succeeded by: Hiroaki Takizawa

Personal details
- Born: 27 December 1956 (age 69) Tokyo, Japan
- Education: Kaisei Academy
- Alma mater: University of Tokyo

Shigeru Kitamura (北村 滋, Kitamura Shigeru; born 27 December 1956) is a Japanese police officer who served as Secretary General of the National Security Secretariat from 2019 to 2021 and Director of Cabinet Intelligence from 2011 to 2019.

Kitamura was a trusted advisor to Prime Minister Shinzo Abe on matters of national security.

== Biography ==
Shigeru Kitamura was born on 27 December 1956 in Tokyo. After attending Kaisei Academy, Kitamura studied law at the University of Tokyo. He joined the National Police Agency after graduating in 1980. While in the agency he was sent for further training at the École nationale d'administration in France.

Kitamura's early career included time as a local police chief, as first secretary to the Embassy of Japan in France, and as division chief in the Security Bureau and the Traffic Bureau. In August 2002 he became chief of the Tokushima Prefectural police. In April 2004 he was appointed chief of the Security Division in the Security Bureau, and in August of the same year he was transferred to chief of the Foreign Affairs Division. In this position he was in charge of the police response to cases of North Korean abductions of Japanese citizens and worked closely with then Deputy Chief Cabinet Secretary Shinzo Abe.

During Abe's first term as prime minister from September 2006 to September 2007, Kitamura served as one of his secretaries. Afterwards Kitamura became chief of the Criminal Affairs Planning Division of the Criminal Affairs Bureau, before being appointed chief of the Hyogo Prefectural police in April 2009. The following year he became chief of the Foreign Affairs and Intelligence Department of the Security Bureau.

=== Cabinet Secretariat ===
Kitamura was appointed Director of Cabinet Intelligence under Prime Minister Yoshihiko Noda in December 2011. He remained in office when Shinzo Abe returned as prime minister in December 2012. Kitamura became one of the officials with whom Abe met most frequently, reflecting Abe's desire to take charge of foreign and security policy. Kitamura championed the strengthening of the intelligence capabilities of the Cabinet Secretariat. He was involved in the adoption of the State Secrecy Law and the foundation of the National Security Council in 2013. In October 2018, he met with his North Korean counterparts from the United Front Department of the Workers' Party of Korea in Mongolia to discuss the abduction issue.

Along with a cabinet reshuffle in September 2019, Kitamura was appointed Secretary General of the National Security Secretariat. He participated in several top level meetings, including with US President Donald Trump and Russian President Vladimir Putin. Kitamura emphasised the importance of economic security and established an Economic Section in the National Security Secretariat in April 2020. Kitamura remained in office when Shinzo Abe was replaced by Yoshihide Suga, but he retired in July 2021 due to health issues.

=== Retirement ===
In September 2021 he established an economic security consulting firm, where he's since served as representative director. The firm partnered with American Global Strategies, the consulting firm of Robert C. O'Brien, Kitamura's American counterpart as National Security Advisor from 2019 to 2021. Kitamura also became senior advisor at American Global Strategies.

In November of the same year he was appointed to an expert council to advise the cabinet on economic security legislation. The Economic Security Act was adopted in May 2022. Kitamura became an auditor of the Nippon Television Network Corporation and Nippon Television Holdings the following month. He became president of the Yomiuri International Economic Society in July of the same year. In June 2025, he became chairman of the Yomiuri Research Institute.

== Awards and honors ==
=== Foreign honours ===
- France:
  - Officer of the Ordre national du Mérite – May 1995
  - Officer of the Legion of Honour – June 2022
- United States: Department of Defense Medal for Distinguished Public Service – January 2020
- Australia: Australian Intelligence Medal – January 2022
- Taiwan: Order of Brilliant Star with Grand Cordon – December 2023

Government offices
Preceded by Shin'ichi Uemastu	Director of Cabinet Intelligence; 2011–2019	Succeeded by Hiroaki Takizawa
Preceded by Shotaro Yachi	National Security Advisor to the Cabinet; 2019–2021	Succeeded by Takeo Akiba
