= Shin Ebihara =

Japanese diplomat

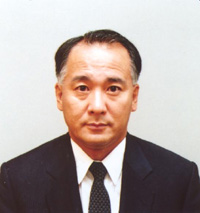

Shin Ebihara (海老原 紳, Ebihara Shin; born February 16, 1948) is a Japanese diplomat.

Ebihara started his diplomatic career in 1971, as quit the University of Tokyo and entered the Ministry of Foreign Affairs, and served as Deputy Director General of the Bureau of Middle Eastern and African Affairs, Director General of the Bureau of North American Affairs, and Executive Secretary to the Prime Minister. In 2006-2008 served as Ambassador to Indonesia. In 2008-2011 served as Japanese Ambassador to the United Kingdom.

Diplomatic posts
Preceded by Yoshiji Nogami	Japanese Ambassador to the United Kingdom; 2008-2011	Succeeded by Keiichi Hayashi
Preceded by Yutaka Iimura	Japanese Ambassador to Indonesia; 2006-2008	Succeeded by Kōjirō Shiojiri
Government offices
Preceded by Shotaro Yachi	Assistant Chief Cabinet Secretary (Foreign Affairs); 2005–2006	Succeeded by Hiroyasu Andō
