= National Security Advisor (Japan) =

Secretary-General of the National Security Secretariat
- 国家安全保障局長
- Emblem of the Government of Japan

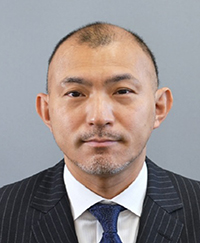
- Incumbent; Keiichi Ichikawa since 21 October 2025
- Cabinet Secretariat
- Reports to: Prime Minister of Japan
- Appointer: Prime Minister of Japan
- Formation: December 4, 2013; 12 years ago
- Deputy: Deputy Secretary-General of the National Security Secretariat

The Secretary-General of the National Security Secretariat (国家安全保障局長, Kokka-Anzen-Hoshō-Kyoku-Chō), commonly referred to as the National Security Advisor, is the head of the National Security Secretariat, a department within the Cabinet Secretariat in charge of the National Security Council. As the principal advisor to the Prime Minister on matters regarding national security, the Secretary-General is one of the most senior officials in the Prime Minister’s Office. The Secretary-General is appointed and serves at the pleasure of the Prime Minister.

The current Secretary-General is Keiichi Ichikawa, who took office on 21 October 2025.

== List of Secretaries-General ==
No.	Name	Tenure start	Tenure end	Tenure length	Ref
1	Shotaro Yachi	4 December 2013	12 September 2019	5 years and 283 days	
2	Shigeru Kitamura	13 September 2019	6 July 2021	1 year and 297 days	
3	Takeo Akiba	7 July 2021	20 January 2025	3 years and 198 days	
4	Masataka Okano	20 January 2025	21 October 2025	1 year and 231 days	
5	Keiichi Ichikawa	21 October 2025	Incumbent	322 days	
