= Chief Cabinet Secretary =

Head of the Cabinet Secretariat of Japan

Chief Cabinet Secretary of Japan 内閣官房長官 Naikaku-kanbō-chōkan
- Emblem of the Government of Japan

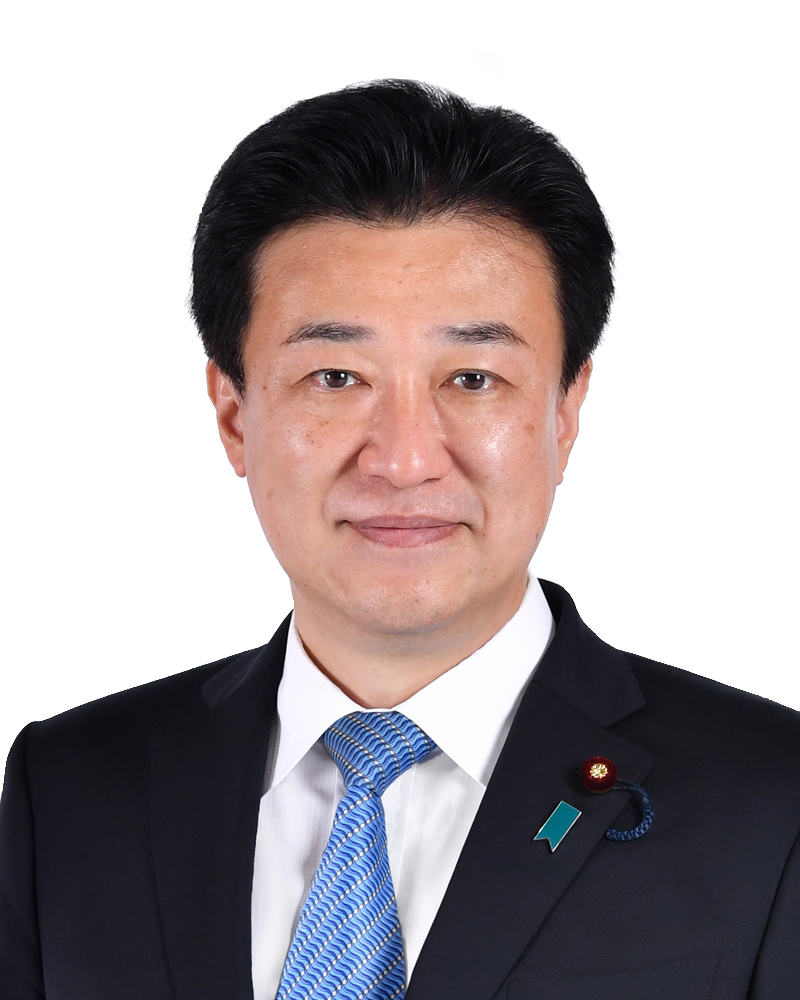
- Incumbent; Minoru Kihara since 21 October 2025
- Cabinet Secretariat
- Style: Mr. Secretary
- Member of: Cabinet; National Security Council; National Intelligence Council
- Reports to: The prime minister
- Appointer: The prime minister; attested to by the emperor
- Term length: No fixed term
- Precursor: Secretary-General of the Cabinet
- Inaugural holder: Jōji Hayashi
- Formation: 3 May 1947; 79 years ago
- Succession: Second
- Deputy: Deputy Chief Cabinet Secretary
- Salary: ¥20,916,000
- Website: http://www.cas.go.jp/

The chief cabinet secretary of Japan (内閣官房長官, Naikaku-kanbō-chōkan) is a member of the cabinet and is the leader and chief executive of the Cabinet Secretariat of Japan. The chief cabinet secretary coordinates the policies of ministries and agencies in the executive branch, and also serves as the government's press secretary. The secretary is a statutory member of the National Security Council, and is appointed by the emperor upon the nomination by the prime minister. The chief cabinet secretary is the second in line of succession to the prime minister, and first if the office of the deputy prime minister is unoccupied.

== History ==
In March 1879, the precursor of the position, the secretary-general of the Cabinet, was created. From 1885, it was included as part of the cabinet system, and the position was known in Japanese as 内閣書記官長 (naikaku-shokikan-chō). The modern position was created on May 3, 1947, shortly after the passage of the Constitution of Japan, and elevated to ministerial status in 1966.

Since 1947, the office of chief cabinet secretary has been regarded as a stepping stone to the post of prime minister. The first chief cabinet secretary to become prime minister was Ichirō Hatoyama, who served in the position under Tanaka Giichi. Since then, eight other former chief cabinet secretaries have become prime ministers, most recently Shinzō Abe, Yasuo Fukuda, and Yoshihide Suga.

Yoshihide Suga, who later became Prime Minister of Japan, served as chief cabinet secretary under Shinzo Abe for nearly eight years, making him the longest-serving chief cabinet secretary in history, having overtaken the previous record of 1,289 days in office set by Fukuda on July 7, 2016.

The current chief cabinet secretary is Minoru Kihara, who took office on October 21, 2025.

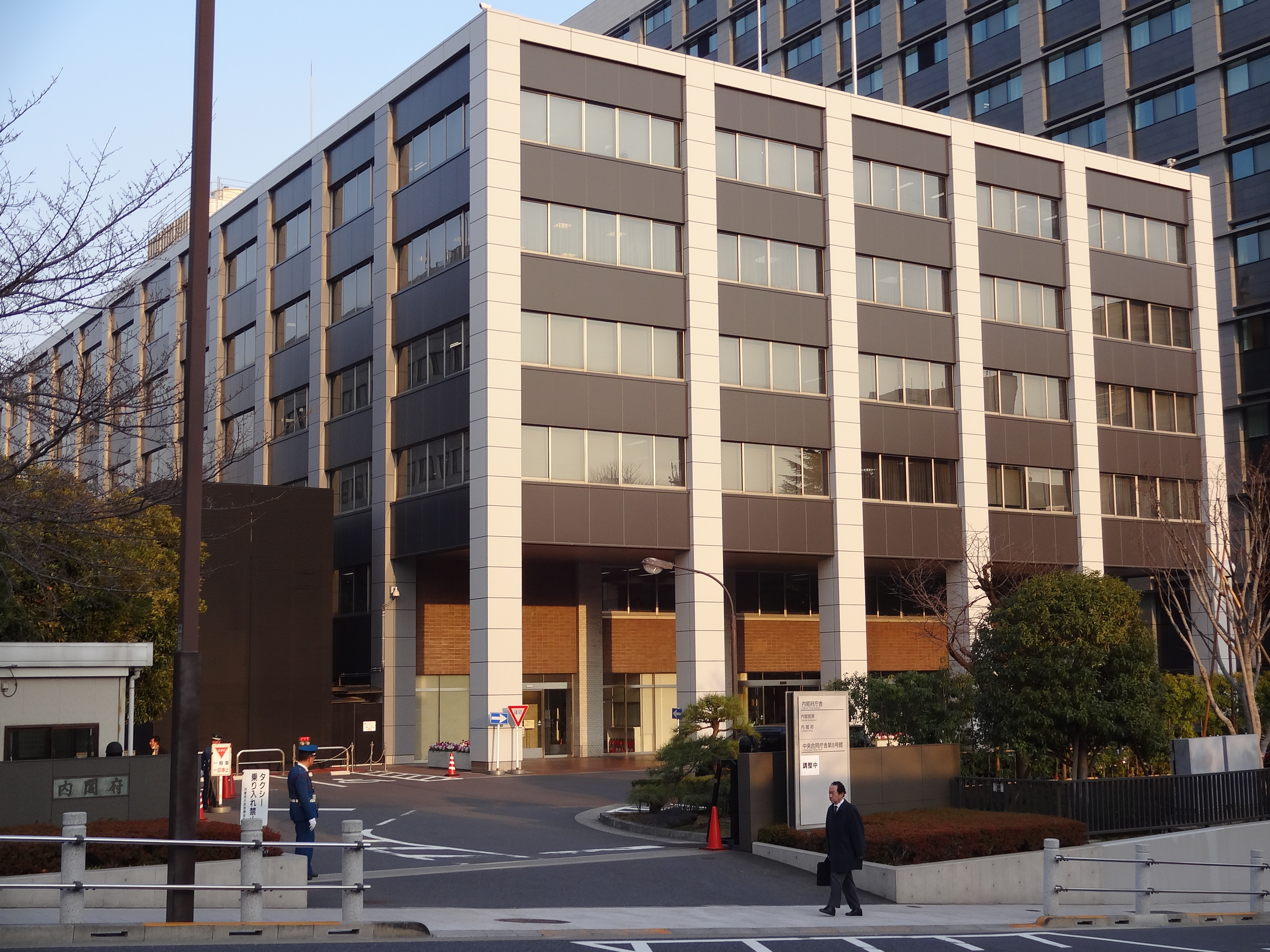
The Cabinet Office Building is where the Cabinet Secretariat resides.

== List of secretaries-general of the cabinet ==
=== Shōwa era ===
- Seiji Tsukamoto (December 25, 1926 – April 20, 1927)
- Ichirō Hatoyama (April 20, 1927 – July 2, 1929) - later became prime minister in the mid-1950s.
- Fujiya Suzuki (July 2, 1929 – April 14, 1931)
- Takukichi Kawasaki (April 14, 1931 – December 13, 1931)
- 4 other holders (December 13, 1931 – October 19, 1934)
- Shigeru Yoshida (October 20, 1934 – May 11, 1935) - not to be confused with PM Shigeru Yoshida.
- Takekai Shirane (May 12, 1935 – March 9, 1936)
- 2 other holders (March 9, 1936 – June 4, 1937)
- Akira Kazami (June 4, 1937 – January 4, 1939)
- Harumichi Tanabe (January 4, 1939 – April 7, 1939)
- 3 other holders (April 7, 1939 – July 22, 1940)
- Kenji Tomita (July 22, 1940 – October 18, 1941)
- Naoki Hoshino (October 18, 1941 – July 22, 1944)
- 4 other holders (July 22, 1944 – 7 April 1945)
- Hisatsune Sakomizu (April 7, 1945 – August 15, 1945)
- Taketora Ogata (August, 15 1945 – October 5, 1945)
- Daizaburō Tsugita (October 9, 1945 – January 13, 1946)
- Wataru Narahashi (January 13, 1946 – May 22, 1946)
- Jōji Hayashi (May 22, 1946 – May 2, 1947)

== List of chief cabinet secretaries ==
=== Shōwa era ===
Liberal (1945)
Socialist
Democratic (1947)
Democratic Liberal
Liberal (1950)
Democratic (1954)
Liberal Democratic

Chief Cabinet Secretary		Term of office			Prime Minister
Portrait	Name	Took office	Left office	Days	Prime Minister
	Jōji Hayashi	May 3, 1947	May 24, 1947	21	Shigeru Yoshida
	Suehiro Nishio	June 1, 1947	March 10, 1948	283	Tetsu Katayama
	Gizō Tomabechi	March 10, 1948	October 15, 1948	219	Hitoshi Ashida
	Eisaku Satō (Note: Later served as Prime Minister 1964-72)	October 17, 1948	February 16, 1949	122	Shigeru Yoshida
	Kaneshichi Masuda	February 16, 1949	May 6, 1950	444	Shigeru Yoshida
	Katsuo Okazaki	May 6, 1950	December 26, 1951	599	Shigeru Yoshida
	Shigeru Hori	December 26, 1951	October 30, 1952	309	Shigeru Yoshida
	Taketora Ogata	October 30, 1952	May 21, 1953	203	Shigeru Yoshida
	Kenji Fukunaga	May 21, 1953	December 10, 1954	568	Shigeru Yoshida
	Ryutarō Nemoto	December 10, 1954	November 22, 1955	744	Ichirō Hatoyama
	Ryutarō Nemoto	November 22, 1955	December 23, 1956	744	Ichirō Hatoyama
	Hirohide Ishida	December 12, 1956	July 10, 1957	210	Tanzan Ishibashi
	Hirohide Ishida	December 12, 1956	July 10, 1957	210	Nobusuke Kishi
	Kiichi Aichi	July 10, 1957	June 12, 1958	337	Nobusuke Kishi
	Munenori Akagi	June 12, 1958	June 18, 1959	371	Nobusuke Kishi
	Etsusaburō Shiina	June 18, 1959	July 19, 1960	397	Nobusuke Kishi
	Masayoshi Ōhira (Note: Later served as Prime Minister 1978-80)	July 19, 1960	July 18, 1962	729	Hayato Ikeda
	Yasumi Kurogane	July 18, 1962	July 18, 1964	731	Hayato Ikeda
	Zenkō Suzuki (Note: Later served as Prime Minister 1980-82)	July 18, 1964	November 9, 1964	114	Hayato Ikeda
	Tomisaburō Hashimoto	November 9, 1964	August 1, 1966	630	Eisaku Satō
	Kiichi Aichi	August 1, 1966	December 3, 1966	124	Eisaku Satō
	Kenji Fukunaga	December 3, 1966	June 22, 1967	201	Eisaku Satō
	Toshio Kimura	June 22, 1967	November 30, 1968	527	Eisaku Satō
	Shigeru Hori	November 30, 1968	July 5, 1971	947	Eisaku Satō
	Noboru Takeshita (Note: Later served as Prime Minister 1987-89)	July 5, 1971	July 7, 1972	368	Eisaku Satō
	Susumu Nikaidō	July 7, 1972	November 11, 1974	857	Kakuei Tanaka
	Noboru Takeshita	November 11, 1974	December 9, 1974	28	Kakuei Tanaka
	Ichitarō Ide	December 9, 1974	December 24, 1976	746	Takeo Miki
	Sunao Sonoda	December 24, 1976	November 28, 1977	339	Takeo Fukuda
	Shintaro Abe	November 28, 1977	December 7, 1978	374	Takeo Fukuda
	Rokusuke Tanaka	December 7, 1978	November 9, 1979	337	Masayoshi Ōhira
	Masayoshi Ito (Note: Served as Acting Prime Minister on the death of Ōhira, 12 June - 17 July 1980)	November 9, 1979	July 17, 1980	251	Masayoshi Ōhira
	Masayoshi Ito	November 9, 1979	July 17, 1980	251	Himself (Acting)
	Kiichi Miyazawa (Note: Later served as Prime Minister 1991-93)	July 17, 1980	November 27, 1982	863	Zenkō Suzuki
	Masaharu Gotōda	November 27, 1982	December 27, 1983	395	Yasuhiro Nakasone
	Takao Fujinami	December 27, 1983	December 28, 1985	732	Yasuhiro Nakasone
	Masaharu Gotōda	December 28, 1985	November 6, 1987	678	Yasuhiro Nakasone
	Keizō Obuchi (Note: Later served as Prime Minister 1998-2000)	November 6, 1987	January 7, 1989	428	Noboru Takeshita

=== Heisei era ===
Liberal Democratic
Japan New Party
New Party Sakigake
Japan Renewal Party
Socialist
Democratic

Chief Cabinet Secretary		Term of office			Prime Minister
Portrait	Name	Took office	Left office	Days	Prime Minister
	Keizō Obuchi	January 8, 1989	June 3, 1989	147	Noboru Takeshita
	Masajuro Shiokawa	June 3, 1989	August 10, 1989	68	Sōsuke Uno
	Tokuo Yamashita	August 10, 1989	August 26, 1989	16	Toshiki Kaifu
	Mayumi Moriyama	August 26, 1989	February 28, 1990	186	Toshiki Kaifu
	Misoji Sakamoto	February 28, 1990	November 5, 1991	615	Toshiki Kaifu
	Koichi Kato	November 5, 1991	December 12, 1992	403	Kiichi Miyazawa
	Yōhei Kōno	December 12, 1992	August 9, 1993	240	Kiichi Miyazawa
	Masayoshi Takemura	August 9, 1993	April 28, 1994	262	Morihiro Hosokawa
	Hiroshi Kumagai	April 28, 1994	June 30, 1994	63	Tsutomu Hata
	Kozo Igarashi	June 30, 1994	August 8, 1995	404	Tomiichi Murayama
	Koken Nosaka	August 8, 1995	January 11, 1996	156	Tomiichi Murayama
	Seiroku Kajiyama	January 11, 1996	September 11, 1997	609	Ryutaro Hashimoto
	Kanezo Muraoka	September 11, 1997	July 30, 1998	322	Ryutaro Hashimoto
	Hiromu Nonaka	July 30, 1998	October 10, 1999	432	Keizo Obuchi
	Mikio Aoki	October 10, 1999	July 4, 2000	273	Keizo Obuchi
	Mikio Aoki	October 10, 1999	July 4, 2000	273	Yoshiro Mori
	Hidenao Nakagawa	July 4, 2000	October 27, 2000	115	Yoshiro Mori
	Yasuo Fukuda (Note: Later served as Prime Minister 2007-08.)	October 27, 2000	May 7, 2004	1380	Yoshiro Mori
	Yasuo Fukuda	October 27, 2000	May 7, 2004	1380	Junichiro Koizumi
	Hiroyuki Hosoda	May 7, 2004	October 31, 2005	450	Junichiro Koizumi
	Shinzo Abe (Note: Later served as Prime Minister 2006-07, 2012-20)	October 31, 2005	September 26, 2006	330	Junichiro Koizumi
	Yasuhisa Shiozaki	September 26, 2006	August 27, 2007	335	Shinzo Abe
	Kaoru Yosano	August 27, 2007	September 26, 2007	30	Shinzo Abe
	Nobutaka Machimura	September 26, 2007	September 24, 2008	364	Yasuo Fukuda
	Takeo Kawamura	September 24, 2008	September 16, 2009	357	Taro Aso
	Hirofumi Hirano	September 16, 2009	June 8, 2010	265	Yukio Hatoyama
	Yoshito Sengoku	June 8, 2010	January 4, 2011	210	Naoto Kan
	Yukio Edano	January 4, 2011	September 2, 2011	241	Naoto Kan
	Osamu Fujimura	September 2, 2011	December 26, 2012	481	Yoshihiko Noda
	Yoshihide Suga (Note: Later served as Prime Minister 2020-21)	December 26, 2012	April 30, 2019	2316	Shinzo Abe

=== Reiwa era ===
Liberal Democratic

Chief Cabinet Secretary		Term of office			Prime Minister
Portrait	Name	Took office	Left office	Days	Prime Minister
	Yoshihide Suga	May 1, 2019	September 16, 2020	504	Shinzo Abe
	Katsunobu Katō	September 16, 2020	October 4, 2021	383	Yoshihide Suga
	Hirokazu Matsuno	October 4, 2021	December 14, 2023	801	Fumio Kishida
	Yoshimasa Hayashi	December 14, 2023	October 1, 2024	292	Fumio Kishida
	Yoshimasa Hayashi	October 1, 2024	October 21, 2025	385	Shigeru Ishiba
	Minoru Kihara	October 21, 2025	Incumbent	337	Sanae Takaichi

== See also ==
- White House Chief of Staff
- Chief Presidential Secretary
