= Masaki Orita =

Japanese diplomat

Masaki Orita (折田 正樹, Orita Masaki; born 1942 in Tokyo) is a Japanese lawyer specializing in international law. He is on the board of directors of the NGO Japan Center for Conflict Prevention.

During the 1990s he served as Director-General of the North American Affairs Bureau of the Japanese Ministry of Foreign Affairs, and as Japanese Ambassador to Denmark and Lithuania. From 2001 to 2004, he was the Japanese Ambassador to the United Kingdom. In 2005, served as Special Envoy for UN Reform on behalf of the Japanese Ministry of Foreign Affairs. He is a member of the Japanese chapter of the International Law Association.

== Works (partial list) ==
- "Practices in Japan Concerning the Conclusion of Treaties", Japanese Annual of International Law, vol. 27 (1984)

Diplomatic posts
Preceded by Sadayuki Hayashi	Ambassador of Japan to United Kingdom; 2001-2004	Succeeded by Yoshiji Nogami
