= Yasumasa Nagamine =

Japanese jurist (born 1954)

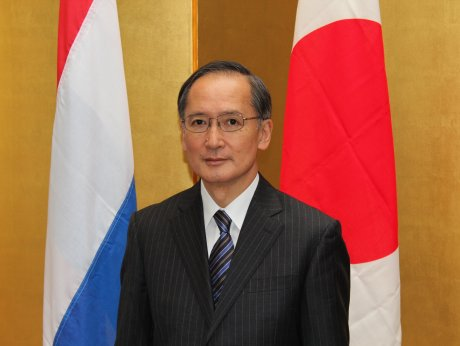
Yasumasa Nagamine

Yasumasa Nagamine (Nagamine Yasumasa; born April 16, 1954) is a Japanese diplomat and judge served as an associate justice of the Supreme Court of Japan from 2021 to 2024. Before his appointment to the court, he served as ambassador to the United Kingdom from 2019 to 2021, to South Korea from 2016 to 2019 and to the Netherlands from 2012 to 2013.

== Education and career ==
Nagamine was born on April 16, 1954, in Japan. He attended the University of Tokyo and graduated from the College of Arts and Sciences in 1977. He served as a career officer in the Japanese Ministry of Foreign Affairs and ambassador for over 40 years before his appointment to the Supreme Court. Specifically, he served in the following roles:

- 1977-1992: officer in Foreign Affairs Ministry
- 1992-1995: Counsellor (adviser) in the Cabinet Legislation Bureau of the Prime Minister's Office
- 1995-1996: Director of the Western Europe Division of the European Affairs Bureau, in the Ministry of Foreign Affairs
- 1996-1998: Director of the Legal Affairs Division, Treaties Bureau (Ministry of Foreign Affairs)
- 1998-2001: Officer in the Embassy of Japan in India
- 2001: Ambassador to India
- 2002-2004: Deputy Director-General of the North American Affairs Bureau, Ministry of Foreign Affairs
- 2004–2006, 2010-2012: Deputy Director-General of the International Legal Affairs Bureau, Ministry of Foreign Affairs
- 2006-2007: Deputy Director-General of the Foreign Policy Bureau, Ministry of Foreign Affairs
- 2007-2010: Consul-General to the United States (San Francisco)
- 2012-2013: Ambassador to the Netherlands
- 2013-2016: Senior Deputy Minister for Foreign Affairs, Ministry of Foreign Affairs
- 2016-2019: Ambassador to the Republic of Korea (South Korea) (On the website of the Supreme Court, it is listed as Ambassador to Korea. However, Japan only recognizes South Korea and has no diplomatic relations with North Korea.)
- 2019-2021: Ambassador to the United Kingdom.

== Supreme Court ==
On February 8, 2021, Nagamine was appointed to the Supreme Court of Japan. In Japan, justices are formally nominated by the Emperor (at that time, Naruhito) but in reality the Cabinet chooses the nominees and the Emperor's role is a formality.

Nagamine's term ended on 15 April 2024, one day before he turned 70, the mandatory retirement age for judges.
