= Minoru Kihara =

Japanese politician (born 1969)

- 木原 稔
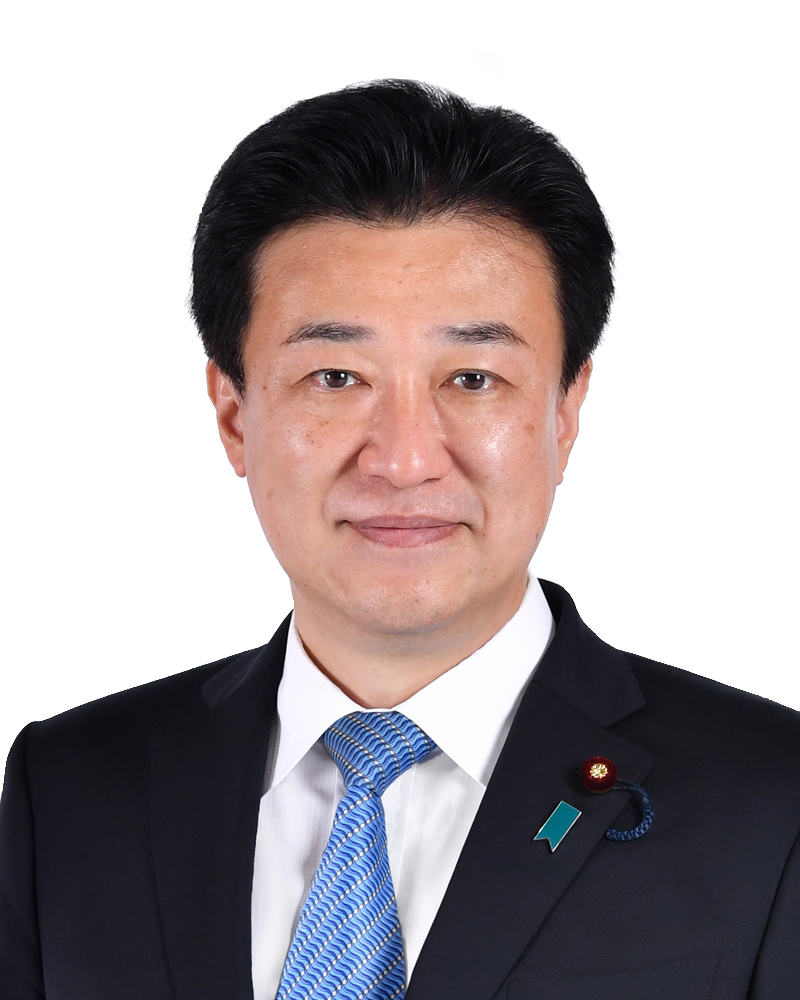
- Official portrait, 2023

Chief Cabinet Secretary
- Incumbent
- Assumed office 21 October 2025
- Prime Minister: Sanae Takaichi
- Preceded by: Yoshimasa Hayashi

Minister of Defense
- In office 13 September 2023 – 1 October 2024
- Prime Minister: Fumio Kishida
- Preceded by: Yasukazu Hamada
- Succeeded by: Gen Nakatani

Member of the House of Representatives
- Incumbent
- Assumed office 18 December 2012
- Preceded by: Yorihisa Matsuno
- Constituency: Kumamoto 1st
- In office 11 September 2005 – 21 July 2009
- Constituency: Kyushu PR

Personal details
- Born: 12 August 1969 (age 57) Kumamoto, Japan
- Party: Liberal Democratic
- Education: Waseda University

Minoru Kihara (木原 稔, Kihara Minoru; born 12 August 1969) is a Japanese politician who has been the Chief Cabinet Secretary since 2025. He previously served as Minister of Defense from 2023 to 2024. A member of the Liberal Democratic Party, he also serves in the House of Representatives, and was previously Parliamentary Vice-Minister of Defense.

== Political career ==
=== House of Representatives ===
A native of Kumamoto and graduate of Waseda University, he was elected for the first time in 2005 after working at Japan Airlines until 2004. Kihara served as the Special Advisor to the Prime Minister for National Security Affairs from 2019 to 2021, for Prime Minister Shinzo Abe and Yoshihide Suga.

Kihara is considered a pro-Taiwan MP. In August 2022, Kihara was part of an unofficial Japanese delegation to Taiwan which met with Taiwanese officials, Premier Su Tseng-chang, and Foreign Minister Joseph Wu. An agreement was reached between the delegation and the Taiwanese government, to hold talks over evacuation plans for the 20,000 Japanese citizens living in Taiwan, in the event of a Chinese invasion.

In July 2023, Kihara participated in a war game conducted by the think tank, Japan Forum for Strategic Studies, the war game simulated a Chinese attack on Taiwan. In the war game, Kihara played the role of Japan's defense minister and proposed using "counterattack capabilities" against China to resist the invasion.

=== Minister of Defense ===
Following a cabinet reshuffle on 13 September 2023, he was appointed minister of defense. Kihara announced on 15 September 2023 that he resigned as secretary general of cross-party group dedicated to enhancing Japan–Taiwan relations, in order to devote himself to his new duties.

On 3 October 2023 Kihara visited the United States, where he met with U.S. officials to reaffirm commitment to the U.S.-Japan alliance and advance new areas of cooperation. To help meet recruitment goals for Japan's core cyber defense forces, Kihara proposed loosening fitness requirements and offering higher salaries for new recruits.

Kihara received criticism for his remarks in October 2023 at a political rally to support the LDP in a by-election, where he stated that "Supporting the LDP candidate will repay the efforts of the Self-Defense Forces and their families.” Critics claimed that Kihara had used the SDF for political purposes, and had violated its political neutrality. Kihara later retracted his remarks for causing a "misunderstanding".

On 2 May 2024 Kihara met with defense chief counterparts from the United States, Philippines, and Australia in Hawaii. In a series of bilateral, trilateral, and quadrilateral talks Kihara alongside his counterparts reaffirmed commitments to maintaining a Free and Open Indo-Pacific.

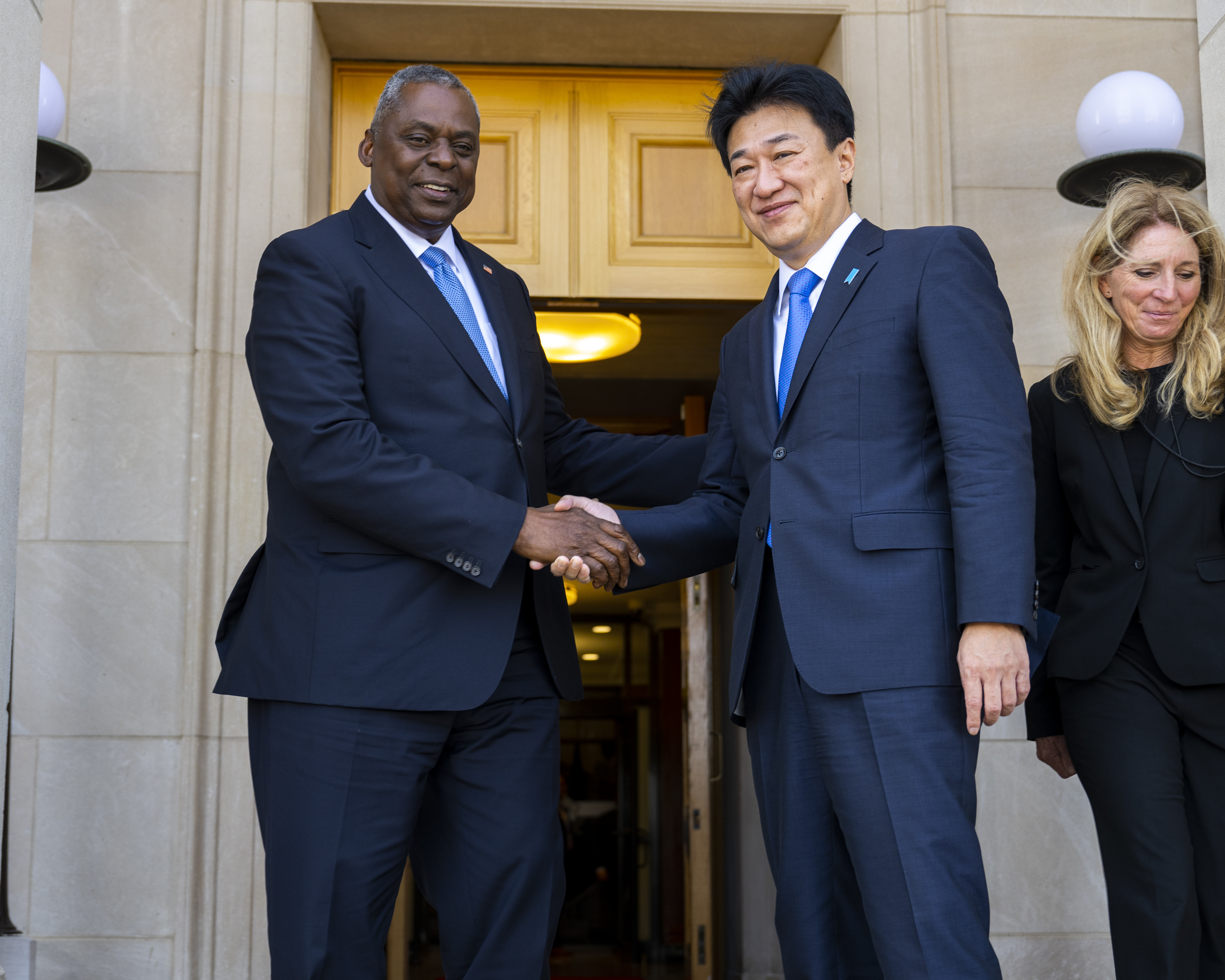
Kihara with U.S. Secretary of Defense Lloyd Austin in Pentagon, Washington, D.C., 4 October 2023

=== Chief Cabinet Secretary ===
On 21 October 2025, Kihara was appointed Chief Cabinet Secretary by Prime Minister Sanae Takaichi, replacing Yoshimasa Hayashi.

On 18 December 2025, Kihara expressed concern regarding images of a Finnish beauty pageant winner and several lawmakers making gestures considered racially offensive to Asians. During a press conference, he stated that Japan expected the Finnish government to "appropriately respond" to the incident.

== Election history ==
Election	Age	District	Political party	Number of votes	election results
2005 Japanese general election	36	Kumamoto 1st district	LDP	110,072	elected by PR
2009 Japanese general election	40	Kumamoto 1st district	LDP	97,585	lost
2012 Japanese general election	43	Kumamoto 1st district	LDP	94,368	Won
2014 Japanese general election	45	Kumamoto 1st district	LDP	87,111	Won
2017 Japanese general election	48	Kumamoto 1st district	LDP	123,431	Won
2021 Japanese general election	52	Kumamoto 1st district	LDP	131,371	Won
2024 Japanese general election	55	Kumamoto 1st district	LDP	110,068	Won
2026 Japanese general election	56	Kumamoto 1st district	LDP	144,036	Won

Political offices
Preceded by Yasukazu Hamada	Minister of Defense; 2023–2024	Succeeded by Gen Nakatani
Preceded by Yoshimasa Hayashi	Chief Cabinet Secretary; 2025–present	Succeeded by Incumbent
