= National Security Council (Japan) =

Japanese national security and intelligence forum

- 国家安全保障会議; Kokka-anzen-hoshō-kaigi

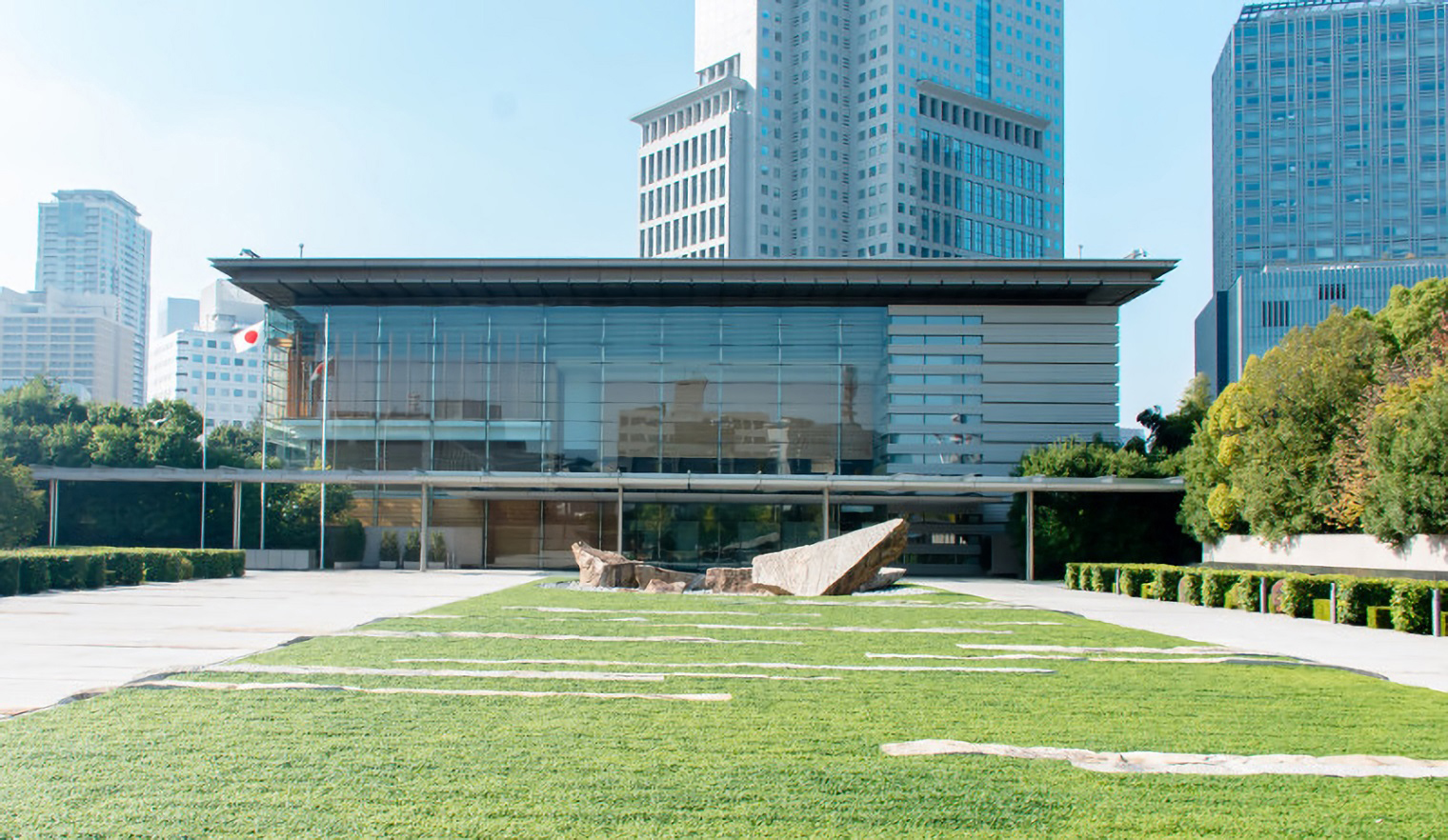
- The Prime Minister's official residence where the National Security Council is established

Agency overview
- Formed: December 4, 2013
- Preceding agency: Security Council
- Headquarters: 2-3-1 Nagata-chō, Chiyoda-ku, Tokyo, Japan
- Agency executives: Prime Minister Sanae Takaichi, Chairman; Keiichi Ichikawa, Secretary-General of the National Security Secretariat
- Parent agency: Cabinet of Japan
- Child agency: National Security Secretariat
- Website: kantei.go.jp

The National Security Council (NSCJ, Japanese: 国家安全保障会議; Hepburn: Kokka anzen hoshō kaigi) is the principal forum used by the prime minister and Cabinet of Japan to coordinate and deliberate on security and defense policies for Japan.

It was formed in 2013 on the initiative of Prime Minister Shinzo Abe to replace the ineffective Security Council and to centralize information management. The NSCJ was officially established on 4 December 2013, following the passing of the law establishing the National Security Council on 27 November 2013.

The council is supported by the National Security Secretariat, a department within the Cabinet Secretariat. The National Security Advisor serves as the Secretary-General of the Secretariat.

== History ==
The immediate predecessor to the National Security Council was the Security Council, which itself had superseded the Defense Council in 1986. The old Security Council had been beset by bureaucratic inefficiencies and lack of coordination. During the Koizumi cabinet there were several calls for the creation of a "Japan-style National Security Council" similar to the United States National Security Council.

After Shinzo Abe was appointed prime minister for the first time in 2006 he initiated preparations for a new National Security Council, but the effort stalled after he stepped down from office in January 2007.

The effort was renewed after Abe was reappointed as prime minister in December 2012. Key features of the proposed new National Security Council was the four-minister meeting which would allow for more flexible and regular deliberation and the creation of a robust staff, the National Security Secretariat.

The House of Representatives passed a bill to establish the council on 7 November 2013 and the House of Councillors followed suit on 27 November.

The Council met for the first time on 4 December 2013 to discuss the adoption of the National Security Strategy and China's Air Defense Identification Zone.

Together with the publication of Japan's first National Security Strategy in December 2013, the NSC represents a centralization of Japanese security policy under the Prime Minister. The National Security Strategy advocates for the creation of an NSC because "the security environment surrounding Japan is further increasing in severity. ... [I]t is necessary for the entire Cabinet to work on the strengthening of foreign affairs and the security system of Japan."

Experts have described the creation of the National Security Council as "the most ambitious reorganization of Japan’s foreign and security policy apparatus since the end of World War II."

== Structure and composition ==
The National Security Council may convene in three different types of ministerial meetings depending on the issues at hand: the four-minister meeting, the nine-minister meeting and the emergency ministerial meeting. All ministerial meetings are chaired by the Prime Minister.

The four-minister meeting consists of the Prime Minister, Minister for Foreign Affairs, Minister of Defense and the Chief Cabinet Secretary. It makes up the core of the council and meets on a biweekly basis to deliberate on matters concerning national security.

The nine-minister meeting, besides the participants of the four-minister meeting, additionally includes the Minister of Finance, Minister for Internal Affairs and Communications, Minister of Economy, Trade and Industry, Minister of Land, Infrastructure, Transport and Tourism and the Chairman of the National Public Safety Commission. This meeting is mainly convened to consider defense planning and budgetary issues.

The emergency ministerial meeting is held in response to emergencies and includes the Prime Minister, the Chief Cabinet Secretary and ministers designated by the Prime Minister depending on the emergency at hand.

Besides ministers, the Deputy Chief Cabinet Secretaries and the Prime Minister's Special Advisor on national security attend meetings and give opinions with the permission of the Prime Minister. Additionally, the Chief of Staff, Joint Staff and other relevant senior officials may be called to attend and give advice by the Prime Minister.

The council has hotlines to its American and British counterparts.

== National Security Secretariat ==
The National Security Secretariat was created in January 2014 as a department of the Cabinet Secretariat to support the National Security Council. It assists the council in both administrative matters, policy planning and information management. The secretariat works closely with the Cabinet Intelligence and Research Office and also receives reports directly from various agencies and bureaux.

It is headed by a Secretary General who doubles as National Security Advisor to the Cabinet. The first Secretary General was Shotaro Yachi, former administrative vice minister of foreign affairs. The Secretary General is supported by two Deputy Secretaries General, positions held concurrently by the Assistant Chief Cabinet Secretaries for foreign affairs and for contingency response. They are followed by three senior counsellors: one high-ranking military officer from the JSDF and one civilian official each from the Foreign and Defense ministries.

The secretariat is primarily staffed by officials seconded from the Foreign and Defense ministries, including military officers, but also officials from the National Police Agency and other relevant institutions. Approximately 90 people work at the secretariat. The secretariat was originally divided into six teams handling various issues: Coordination, Intelligence, Strategic Planning and three regional policy teams. In 2020, an economic team devoted to economic security was formed on the initiative of Secretary General Shigeru Kitamura. Each team headed by an official with the rank equivalent to a ministerial division chief.
