= Cabinet Secretariat (Japan) =

Agency of Japanese government

Coordinates: 35.672997°N 139.745267°E

- 内閣官房; Naikaku-kanbō

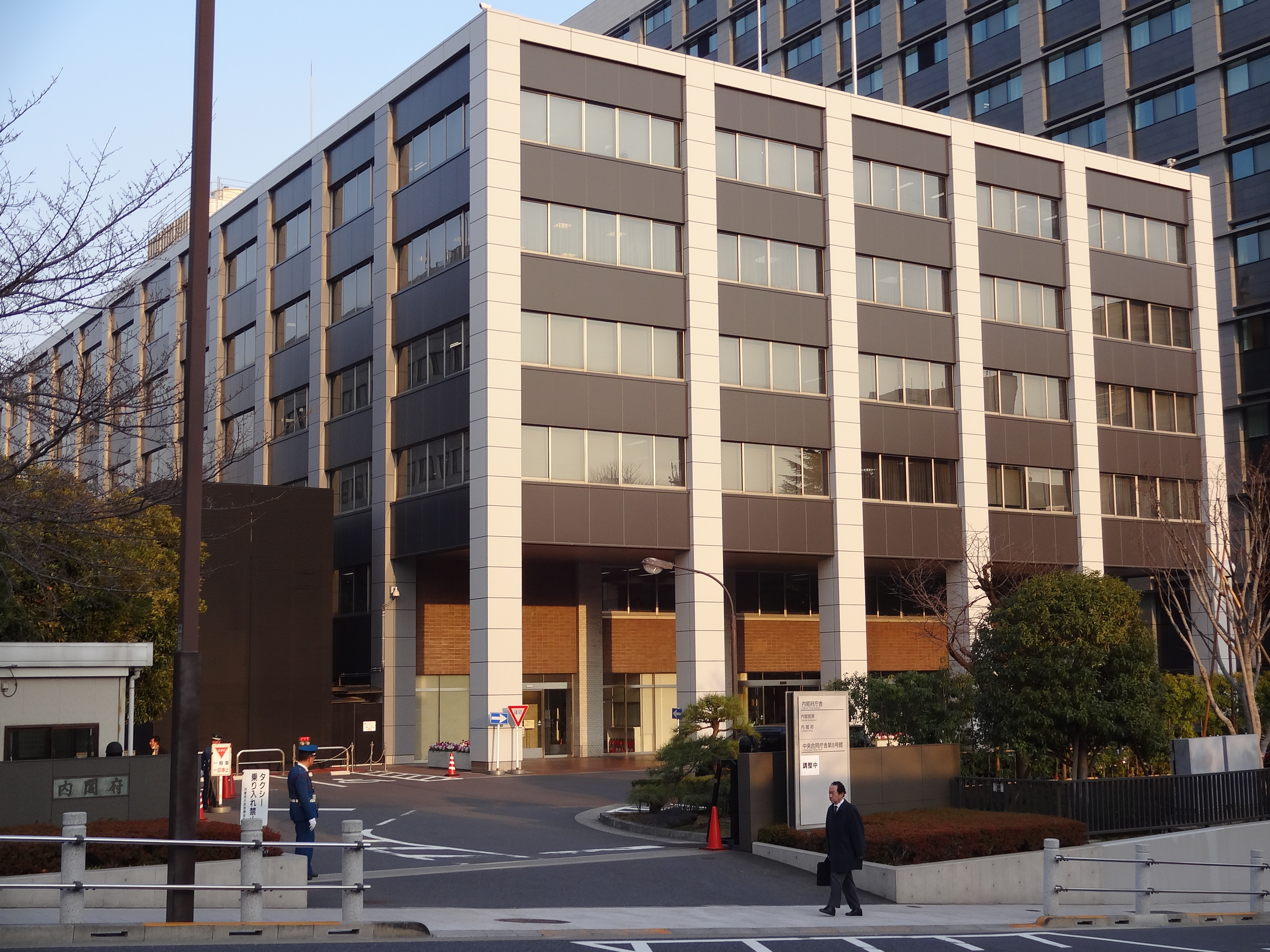
- The Cabinet Office Building

Agency overview
- Formed: December 20, 1924
- Jurisdiction: Japan
- Headquarters: Nagatachō 1-6-1, Chiyoda, Tokyo, Japan
- Employees: 1,303
- Annual budget: ¥97,632,972,000 (2023)
- Secretary responsible: Minoru Kihara, Chief Cabinet Secretary
- Deputy Secretary responsible: Masanao Ozaki, Kei Satō and Yasuhiro Tsuyuki, Deputy Chief Cabinet Secretary
- Website: www.cas.go.jp (in Japanese)

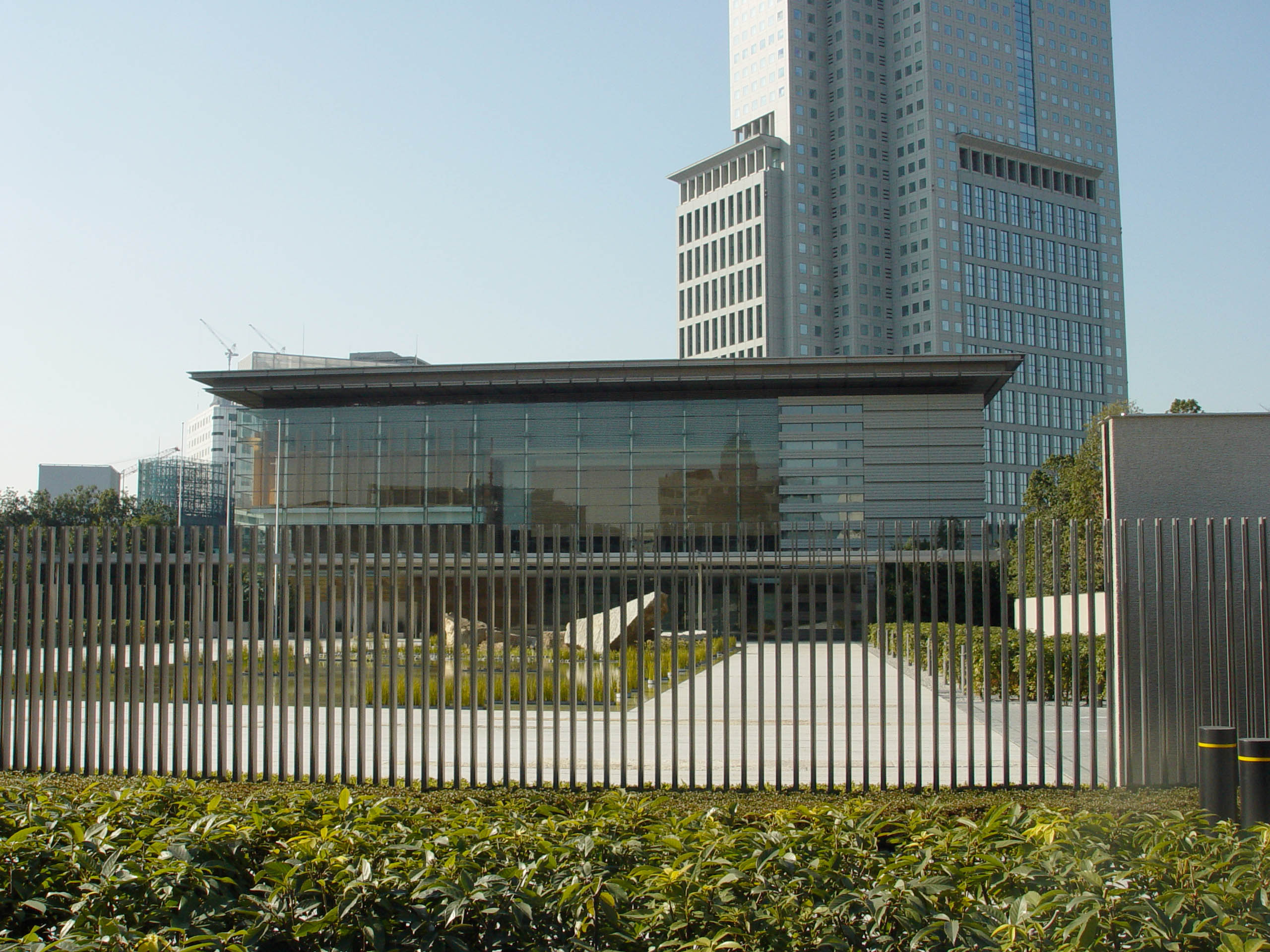
The Cabinet Secretariat is in charge of the Prime Minister's Official Residence (Kantei)

The Cabinet Secretariat (内閣官房, Naikaku-kanbō) is an agency in the Japanese government, headed by the Chief Cabinet Secretary. It organizes the Cabinet's public relations, coordinates ministries and agencies, collects intelligence, and organizes miscellaneous other tasks for the Cabinet, including the Prime Minister's office (Kantei) and residence (Kōtei).

== Organization ==
The Cabinet Secretariat consists of the Cabinet Counsellors' [sic] Office, the Cabinet Councillors' Office on Internal Affairs, the Cabinet Councillors' Office on External Affairs, the Cabinet Office for National Security Affairs and Crisis Management, the Cabinet Public Relations Office and the Cabinet Information Research Office.

- Chief Cabinet Secretary
  - 3 Deputy Chief Cabinet Secretaries
    - 3 Assistant Chief Cabinet Secretaries
    - 4 separate department heads in: the Cabinet Public Relations Office, the Cabinet Intelligence and Research Office, the National Security Secretariat and the Cabinet Affairs Office
- Information Technology Policy Office
- Headquarters for the Promotion of Administrative reform
- Cabinet Agency for Infectious Disease Crisis Management (内閣感染症危機管理統括庁)
- Comprehensive Ainu Policy Office
- Cabinet Public Relations Office
- National Center of Incident Readiness and Strategy for Cybersecurity
- Cybersecurity Strategic Headquarters
