= Ministry of Foreign Affairs (Japan) =

Government ministry of Japan

- 外務省; Gaimu-shō
- Seal of the Ministry of Foreign Affairs

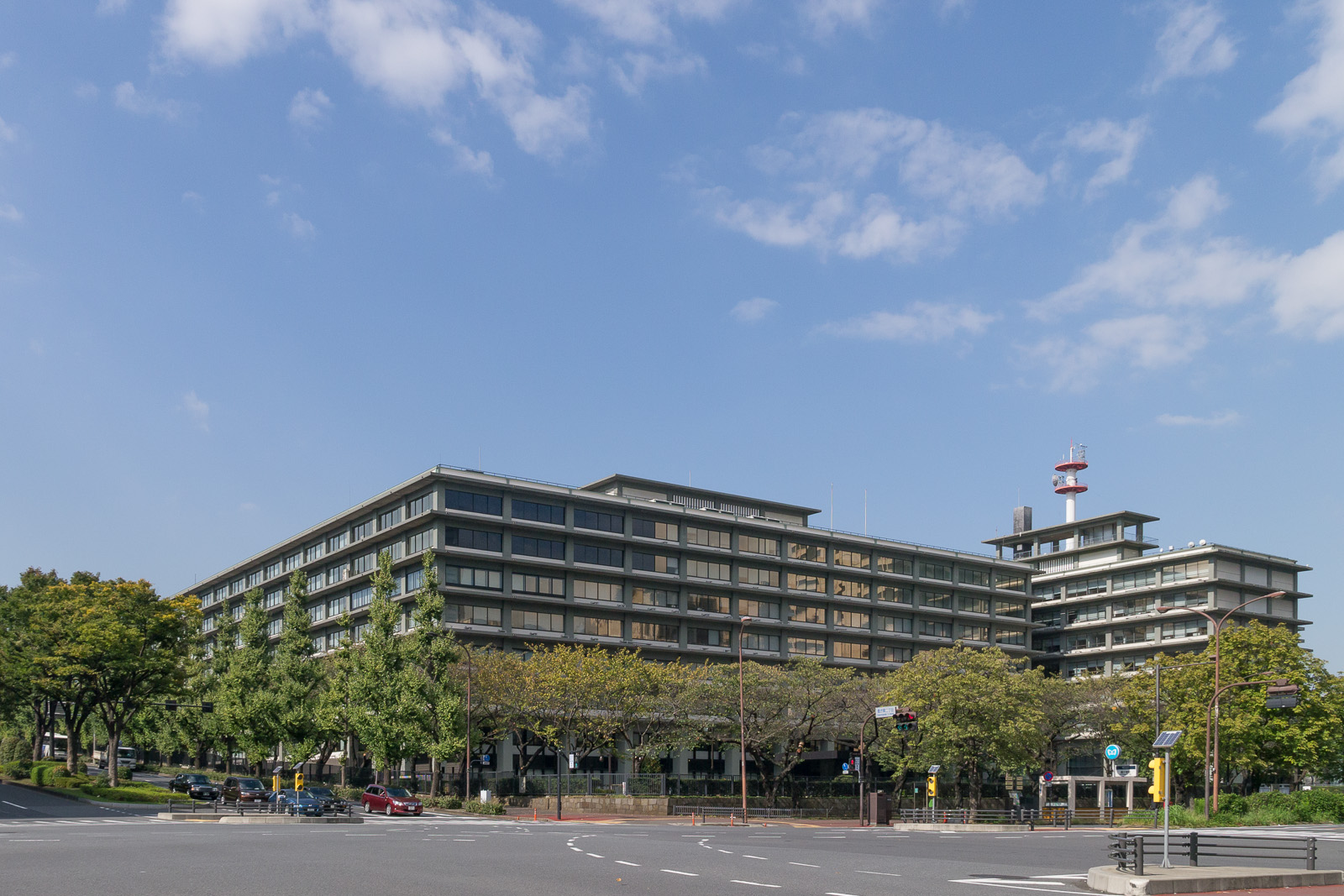
- Ministry of Foreign Affairs Building

Agency overview
- Formed: August 15, 1869; 157 years ago
- Jurisdiction: Japan and its diplomatic missions
- Headquarters: 2-2-1 Kasumigaseki, Chiyoda-ku, Tokyo 100-8919, Japan; 35°40′26.4″N 139°44′56.4″E
- Employees: 6281
- Minister responsible: Toshimitsu Motegi, Minister for Foreign Affairs
- Deputy Ministers responsible: Iwao Horii; Ayano Kunimitsu
- Agency executives: Masataka Okano, Undersecretary; Masahiro Takamura, State Minister; Yoichi Takamura, State Minister; Yasushi Hosaka, State Minister
- Parent agency: Executive department of the Government of Japan
- Website: www.mofa.go.jp

The Ministry of Foreign Affairs (Japanese: 外務省, Hepburn: Gaimu-shō) is an executive department of the Government of Japan, and is responsible for the country's foreign policy and international relations.

The ministry was established by the second term of the third article of the National Government Organization Act, and the Ministry of Foreign Affairs Establishment Act. According to the law, the mission of the ministry is "to aim at improvement of the profits of Japan and Japanese nationals, while contributing to maintenance of peaceful and safe international society, and, through an active and eager measure, both to implement good international environment and to keep and develop harmonic foreign relationships".

== Policy formulation ==
Under the 1947 constitution, the cabinet exercises primary responsibility for the conduct of foreign affairs, subject to the overall supervision of the National Diet. The prime minister is required to make periodic reports on foreign relations to the Diet, whose upper and lower houses each have a foreign affairs committee. Each committee reports on its deliberations to plenary sessions of the chamber to which it belongs. Ad hoc committees are formed occasionally to consider special questions. Diet members have the right to raise pertinent policy questions—officially termed interpellations—to the minister for foreign affairs and the prime minister. Treaties with foreign countries require ratification by the Diet. As head of state, the emperor performs the ceremonial function of receiving foreign envoys and attesting to foreign treaties ratified by the Diet.

As the chief executive and constitutionally the dominant figure in the political system, the prime minister has the final word in major foreign policy decisions. The Minister for Foreign Affairs, a member of the cabinet, acts as the prime minister's chief adviser in matters of planning and implementation. The minister is assisted by two vice ministers: one in charge of administration, who was at the apex of the Ministry of Foreign Affairs structure as its senior career official, and the other in charge of political liaison with the Diet. Other key positions in the ministry include members of the ministry's Secretariat, which has divisions handling consular, emigration, communications, and cultural exchange functions, and the directors of the various regional and functional bureaus in the ministry.

The ministry's staff includes an elite career foreign service corps, recruited on the basis of a competitive examination and thereafter trained by the ministry's Foreign Service Training Institute. The handling of specific foreign policy issues is usually divided between the geographic and functional bureaus to minimize overlap and competition. In general, bilateral issues are assigned to the geographic bureaus, and multilateral problems to the functional bureaus. The Treaties Bureau, with its wide-ranging responsibilities, tend to get involved in the whole spectrum of issues. The Information Analysis, Research, and Planning Bureau engages in comprehensive and coordinated policy investigation and planning.

Long a profession of high social prestige, diplomatic service from the Meiji period through World War II was a preserve of the upper social strata. In addition to formal qualifications, important prewar requirements for admission were proper social origin, family connections, and graduation from Tokyo Imperial University (the present-day University of Tokyo). After World War II, these requirements were changed as part of democratic reform measures but foreign service continued to be a highly regarded career. Most career foreign service officers had passed the postwar Higher Foreign Service Examination before entry into the service. Many of these successful examinees were graduates of the prestigious Law Faculty of the University of Tokyo. Almost all ambassadorial appointments since the 1950s have been made from among veteran diplomats.

Diplomacy in postwar Japan was not a monopoly of the Ministry of Foreign Affairs. Given the overriding importance of economic factors in foreign relations, the ministry worked closely with the Ministry of Finance on matters of customs, tariffs, international finance, and foreign aid; with the Ministry of International Trade and Industry (MITI) on exports and imports; and with the Ministry of Agriculture, Forestry, and Fisheries on questions of foreign agricultural imports and fishing rights. The Ministry of Foreign Affairs also consulted other agencies, such as the Defense Agency, the Fair Trade Commission, the Japan Export-Import Bank (JEXIM), the Japan External Trade Organization (JETRO), the Overseas Economic Cooperation Fund, and the Overseas Technical Cooperation Agency. On many issues affecting the country's foreign economic activities—and thus its diplomatic relations as well—the Ministry of Foreign Affairs and sometimes MITI and the Ministry of Finance were known to favor liberalizing import restrictions. The Ministry of Agriculture, Forestry, and Fisheries and other domestic ministries, however, took a more protectionist stand, evidently because of pressures from special interest groups.

The vital importance of foreign affairs expanded to affect virtually every aspect of national life in postwar Japan, and the multiplicity of agencies involved in external affairs continued to be a source of confusion and inefficiency in the formulation of foreign policy. Yet as the postwar generation of leaders and policymakers began to assume a greater role in government decision making and as public attitudes on foreign policy issues matured, there were indications that foreign affairs were being conducted on the basis of a more stable consensus.

The current Minister for Foreign Affairs is Toshimitsu Motegi.

== Diplomatic Bluebook ==
The Diplomatic Bluebook (外交青書, Gaikō Seisho) is an annual report produced by the Ministry outlining the government's foreign policy and assessment of international political trends. The Bluebook was first issued in 1957. The report can trigger reactions from other countries upset with relevant Japanese policy. For instance, the omission of the phrase "South Korea is our most important neighbor" and the addition of "South Korea's occupation of [the Liancourt Rocks] is illegal" in the 2018 Bluebook caused significant controversy with the South Korean government.

== Main branches (modern) ==
- Minister's Secretariat
- Chief of Protocol
- Press Secretary / Director-General for Press and Public Relations
- Public Diplomacy Department
- Foreign Policy Bureau
- Disarmament, Non-Proliferation and Science Department
- Asian and Oceanian Affairs Bureau
- Southeast and Southwest Asian Affairs Department
- North American Affairs Bureau
- Latin American and Caribbean Affairs Bureau
- European Affairs Bureau
- Middle Eastern and African Affairs Bureau
- Director-General for Sub-Saharan African Affairs
- Economic Affairs Bureau
- International Cooperation Bureau
- Director-General for Global Issues
- International Legal Affairs Bureau
- Consular Affairs Bureau
- Intelligence and Analysis Service
- Foreign Service Training Institute

== See also ==
- List of ministers for foreign affairs of Japan
- List of diplomatic missions of Japan
- Foreign policy of Japan
- Foreign relations of Japan
- Gaikoku bugyō
- Thomas Baty, former legal advisor to the ministry
- Katsuhiko Oku
