= Mitoji Yabunaka =

Japanese Vice-Minister for Foreign Affairs

- 薮中三十二
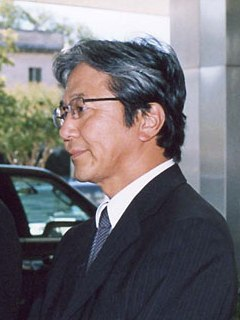
- Mitoji Yabunaka in 2005

Vice Minister for Foreign Affairs
- In office 17 January 2008 – 20 August 2010
- Preceded by: Shotaro Yachi
- Succeeded by: Kenichirō Sasae

Personal details
- Born: 23 January 1948 (age 78) Osaka Prefecture, Japan
- Education: University of Osaka

Mitoji Yabunaka (薮中 三十二, Yabunaka Mitoji; born 23 January 1948) is a Japanese former diplomat who served as Vice Minister for Foreign Affairs from 2008 to 2010. Prior to that position, Yabunaka served as Ministry of Foreign Affair's Asian and Oceanian Affairs Bureau Director-General. He has been a diplomat for nearly forty years.

Yabunaka has represented Japan on a number of occasions and has negotiated trade deals with the United States, Australia and Indonesia. He has had contact with a number of United States diplomats, including hosting current United States Ambassador to Japan John Roos shortly following Roos' appointment. During the first, second and third rounds of the Six-party talks, Yabunaka represented Japan as chief delegate. The Japanese government also sent Yabanuka as a delegate to China to discuss issues of natural gas reserves under the East China Sea.

He handled Myanmar relations during the Kenji Nagai shooting incident, demanding an investigation and challenging governmental claims. Yabunaka replaced Toshiyuki Takano as Director General of Asian and Oceanian Affairs Bureau in 2002. In 2008 Yabunaka held talks with South Korean Ambassador Kwon Chul Hyun over disputed islets in the Sea of Japan.

== Early life and career ==
Yabunaka was born in January 23, 1945 and grew up in Osaka Prefecture, In his youth he played as a pitcher in amateur baseball, and was a Hanshin Tigers fan.

After graduating from Osaka Prefectural Sumiyoshi High School, he entered the Faculty of Law at the University of Osaka. While at university, Yabunaka served as president of the English Speaking Society (ESS). In 1968 during his third year, he passed the specialized and rigorous recruitment examination for the Ministry of Foreign Affairs. To which he dropped out of University and joined the Ministry in April, the following year. At the recommendation of his superior, Yoichi Yamaguchi, he took the higher-level Foreign Ministry career examination, which he passed, and was destined to go on the track, of a career bureaucrat the following year. His contemporaries on the same track included Mitsuaki Kojima, Masaki Kunieda, Masaaki Ono, and Yoshihiro Nishida (later Director-General of the Latin America and Caribbean Affairs Bureau), who were all successful in their diplomat careers.

In 1971, Yabunaka studied English at Southern Illinois University and Cornell University. He graduated from the latter in 1973, where he later described his two years at Cornell as the period in which he studied the hardest in his life, gaining the ability to read English at roughly the same speed as Japanese.

In June 1973, he took his first diplomatic mission as the Second Secretary (assistant to the diplomat) at the Embassy of Japan, Seoul in the Republic of Korea. During a demonstration in which protesters stormed the embassy, Yabunaka took on the role as a bodyguard for the Japanese Ambassador, shielding him from possible violence. After returning to the Ministry, he served as First Secretary at the Japanese embassy in Indonesia from August 1981 and at the Embassy of Japan, Washington D.C. in the United States from June 1983. In August 1986, he returned to Tokyo as Director of the Second International Organizations Division in the Economic Affairs Bureau (OECD desk). From January 1987 for approximately three years, he served as Director of the Second Division, in the North American Affairs Bureau, handling Japan–U.S. economic relations and engaging in working-level negotiations ranging from Japan–U.S. trade friction to the Japan–U.S. Structural Impediments Initiative.

In September 1990, after nearly seven years of Japan–U.S. economic negotiations, Yabunaka left the frontline spending about one year as a Senior Research Fellow at the International Institute for Strategic Studies (IISS) in London. From 1991, he served for three years as a (Minister-Counselor) at the Permanent Mission of Japan to the International Organizations in Geneva. In 1995, he was a visiting professor at University of Osaka. In July 1996, he was promoted from Director of the General Affairs Division in the Minister’s Secretariat to Director-General-level Consolidated Senior Policy Coordinator in the Minister’s Secretariat. He also lectured at Waseda University. In August 1997, he concurrently served as Senior Policy Coordinator in the Asian Affairs Bureau. From October 1998, Yabunaka was Consul at the Consulate-General of Japan in Chicago. In April–May of the following year, he supported Prime Minister Keizō Obuchi’s visit to Chicago during his U.S. trip, arranging a ceremonial first pitch at a baseball game (Obuchi as pitcher and Sammy Sosa as catcher). He also served as principal for a day at LARA Academy, a public elementary school in Chicago. In 2001, he received a pay cut as disciplinary punishment in connection with the Ministry of Foreign Affairs confidential funds misuse scandal.

In April 2002, he left his post as Consul-General in Chicago and returned to Japan. In December of that year, he was appointed Director-General of the Asian and Oceanian Affairs Bureau. Yabunaka served as Japan’s chief negotiator on North Korea and China issues, particularly regarding the return of abductees of Japanese citizens and the North Korean nuclear weapons issue (representing Japan at the first, second, and third rounds of the Six-party talks). In January 2005, he became Vice-Minister for Foreign Affairs (Economic Affairs). In January 2007, he became Senior Vice-Minister for Foreign Affairs (Political Affairs). On January 17, 2008, he was appointed Vice-Minister for Foreign Affairs, succeeding Shōtarō Taniuchi, being chosen over the frontrunner Shin Ebihara. In September 2009, following the change of government from the Liberal Democratic Party-Komeito coalition to the Democratic Party of Japan led administration, he commented that he felt some emotion regarding the cancellation of the Vice-Ministers’ regular meetings. It was later revealed through WikiLeaks documents released in September 2011 that in August 2009, ahead of President Barack Obama’s planned first visit to Japan in November, he had told Ambassador John Roos that expectations for the “world without nuclear weapons” mentioned in Obama’s speech should be tempered, and that a visit to Hiroshima would be insensitive and should be avoided.

Yabunaka retired in 2010. He subsequently became an advisor to the Ministry of Foreign Affairs. In October 2010, he was appointed Special Visiting Professor at Ritsumeikan University’s College of International Relations and advisor to Nomura Research Institute. In 2011, he joined Kawasaki Kisen Kaisha, Ltd. as a director and served on the Advisory Committee of Mitsui Fudosan, Ltd. In 2012, he became a director of Mitsubishi Electric (serving on the Nomination and Compensation Committees) and, from April 2012 to 2014, a director of Komatsu Ltd. From April 2014, he participated as staff in the endowed course at Osaka University’s Graduate School of International Public Policy established by the Inamori Foundation.

In 2022, he was awarded the Grand Cordon of the Order of the Sacred Treasure.
