= History of the Imperial Japanese Navy (1882–1893) =

The History of the Imperial Japanese Navy (IJN) begins when it was first formed in 1868. The new military subsequently underwent changes as the new Meiji government became more organized, while adapting national policy with available resources. During the 1870s, failed in engage in significant expansion. This was due in part to the domestic turmoil such as peasant and samurai uprisings faced by the nascent Meiji government and financial difficulties, as acquiring a large navy was an expensive proposition. Consequently, the IJN concentrated on developing its officer corps and the training of its personnel. However, in the early 1880s, in the aftermath of the Imo Incident in 1882 and with internal threats to its security eliminated, the Meiji government undertook the first significant naval expansion in Japan's history. The IJN developed plans for the expansion of the fleet to forty-two vessels, thirty-two of which would have to be newly constructed. Between 1882 and 1884, twelve new vessels were purchased or put under construction. Spurred on by anxieties over China, Japanese military expenditures grew steadily in the 1880s. In 1880 the share of military spending had amounted to 19 percent of total government expenditures, in 1886 it had risen to 25 percent and by 1890 it stood at 31 percent.

== Japanese military buildup ==
=== Imo Incident ===
During 1882, the Imo incident occurred in the Korean capital of Seoul. The initial mutiny was triggered by corrupt officials embezzling rice from soldiers pay, it later manifested itself to attacks on Japanese including the death of Horimoto Reizo who had been in the country to train Korean soldiers. The Japanese legation was burned and the minister to Korea, Hanabusa Yoshitada, and twenty seven members of his staff were forced to flee to Japan. There was significant indignation in Japan at the treatment of its nationals. Hanabusa was ordered back to Seoul by the Japanese foreign office to negotiate a settlement with the Koreans, including the punishment of the rioters and compensation for Japanese victims. On August 10, a squadron of eight warships under the command of Admiral Nire Kagenori, was assembled in Shimonoseki to escort Minister Hanabusa back to Korea. The squadron included the Amagi, with a young Lieutenant Tōgō Heihachirō as executive officer. This squadron was later assigned to patrols off the Korean coast as a show of force. The Chinese, however, were able to dispatch a much larger force and quickly gain control of the capital and reasserted Korea's dependency on China.

The Imo crisis had persuaded top civilian leaders in Japan that it was undesirable to postpone expenditure on a larger military. During the 1870s, the Japanese government was faced with internal peasant uprisings and samurai rebellions, which had led to rampant inflation and financial difficulties. Consequently, the government had decided in late 1880 to stabilize the currency by increased taxation and financial retrenchment. However, the Imo mutiny had underscored the urgency of military expansion, as Japan's limited military and naval power was made apparent. In contrast to the Chinese who had quickly dispatched an expeditionary force to Seoul, where they quickly established order and controlled the situation with their military superiority over the rioters, the Japanese had been forced to pursue a reactive or passive policy. To many in the country, including Yamagata Aritomo, the lesson was clear — that a conscript army of forty thousand men was no longer adequate to Japan's needs and neither was a navy lacking transport ships to dispatch troops abroad: were hostilities to break out with Korea or China, the country would be in a serious predicament. If Japan went to war, it would not have enough vessels to protect the home islands and if it used its fleet to protect the home islands it would not be able to mount an attack overseas. As the Chinese were building up their naval forces, and Japan would be unable to defend itself against China in a possible future conflict. Iwakura argued that it was of the utmost urgency to spend more on the navy even if this meant raising taxes. Even Finance Minister Matsukata Masayoshi, who had implemented the fiscal retrenchment policy, agreed that financial resources had to be found for a military and naval buildup if the international situation required.

=== Naval expansion bill of 1882 ===
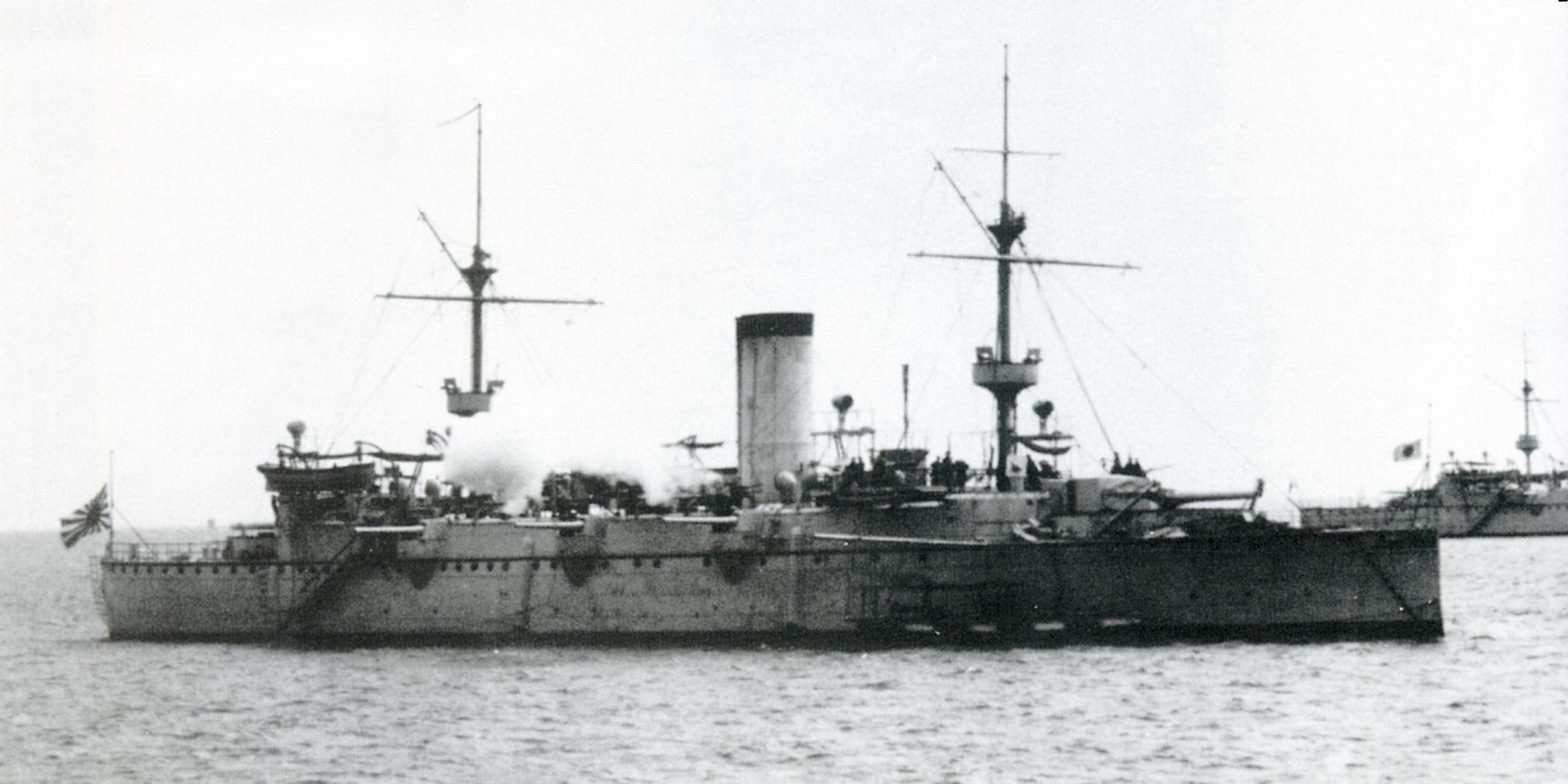
The British-built Naniwa in 1887, was one of the ships ordered as part of the 1882 expansion bill.

After the Imo Incident in July 1882, Iwakura Tomomi submitted a document to the Daijō-kan titled "Opinions Regarding Naval Expansion" asserting that a strong navy was essential to maintaining Japanese security. In furthering his argument, Iwakura suggested that domestic rebellions were no longer Japan's primary military concern and that naval affairs should take precedence over army concerns; a strong navy was more important than a sizable army to preserve the Japanese state. Furthermore, he justified that a large, modern navy, would have the added potential benefit of instilling Japan with greater international prestige and recognition, as navies were internationally recognized hallmarks of power and status. Iwakura also suggested that the Meiji government could support naval growth by increasing taxes on tobacco, sake, and soy.

After lengthy discussions, Iwakura eventually convinced the ruling coalition to support Japan's first multi-year naval expansion plan in history. In May 1883, the government approved a plan that, when completed, would add 32 warships over eight years at a cost of just over ¥26 million. This development was very significant for the navy, as the amount allocated virtually equaled the navy's entire budget between 1873 and 1882. The 1882 naval expansion plan succeeded in a large part because of Satsuma power, influence, and patronage. Between 19 August and 23 November 1882, Satsuma forces with Iwakura's leadership, worked tirelessly to secure support for the Navy's expansion plan. After uniting the other Satsuma members of the Dajokan, Iwakura approached the emperor the Meiji emperor arguing persuasively just as he did with the Dajōkan, that naval expansion was critical to Japan's security and that the standing army of forty thousand men was more than sufficient for domestic purposes. While the government should direct the larger share of future military appropriations toward the navy, a powerful navy would legitimize an increase in tax revenue. On November 24, the emperor assembled select ministers of the daijō-kan together with military officers, and announced the need for increased tax revenues to provide adequate funding for military expansion, this was followed by an imperial re-script. The following month, in December, an annual ¥7.5-million tax increase on sake, soy, and tobacco was fully approved, in the hopes that it would provide ¥3.5 million annually for warship construction and ¥2.5 million for warship maintenance. In February 1883, the government directed further revenues from other ministries to support an increase in the navy's warship construction and purchasing budget. By March 1883, the navy secured the ¥6.5 million required annually to support an eight-year expansion plan, this was the largest that the Imperial Japanese Navy had secured in its young existence.

However, naval expansion remained a highly contentious issue for both the government and the navy throughout much of the 1880s. Overseas advances in naval technology increased the costs of purchasing large components of a modern fleet, so that by 1885 cost overruns had jeopardized the entire 1883 plan. Furthermore, increased costs coupled with decreased domestic tax revenues, heightened concern and political tension in Japan regarding funding naval expansion.

=== Public support ===
The planned tax-increase of 1882 failed to deliver the estimated revenue for expansion. Consequently, the government sought an alternative means by which to support naval expansion. In 1886, after prolonged discussions, the government proposed the issuance of public bonds to provide the navy with the necessary funds. With support from the emperor, the government provided a loan to the navy underwritten by public bonds, this was the first bond campaign of the Meiji state that specifically earmarked funds exclusively for military expansion. The total monetary amount of bonds to be issued was ¥16.7 million, to be divided over three years, with the assumption that roughly ¥5 million or so would be purchased each year. However, when the first-term bonds were issued, Japanese citizens purchased three times the estimated amount. In 1886 alone, the government secured ¥16,642,300 from the public. The bonds proved so popular that the emperor asked prime minister Ito Hirobumi to establish a fund to which other citizens could donate money for naval expansion. Serving as an example, on 14 March 1887, the emperor informed the government that the Imperial family would make an initial donation of ¥300,000 to help assist naval port development and warship purchases. Commencing on 23 March 1887, the naval collection campaign raised more than ¥2 million by that September.

Rich industrialists and aristocrats also provided large contributions: Prince Shimazu and Prince Mori, the former daimyōs of Satsuma and Chōshu, respectively, each donated ¥100,000; Iwasaki Yataro of Mitsubishi shipbuilding and his eldest son, Hisaya, each provided ¥50,000; Kawasaki Hachiroemon of Kawasaki banking and shipbuilding provided ¥50,000; and Hara Rokurō, president of the Yokohama Specie Bank, donated ¥50,000. These donations provided funds to cover purchases as well as the cost overruns associated with the construction of Kure and Sasebo naval stations.
