= Shunji Yanai =

Japanese diplomat (born 1937)

- 柳井 俊二
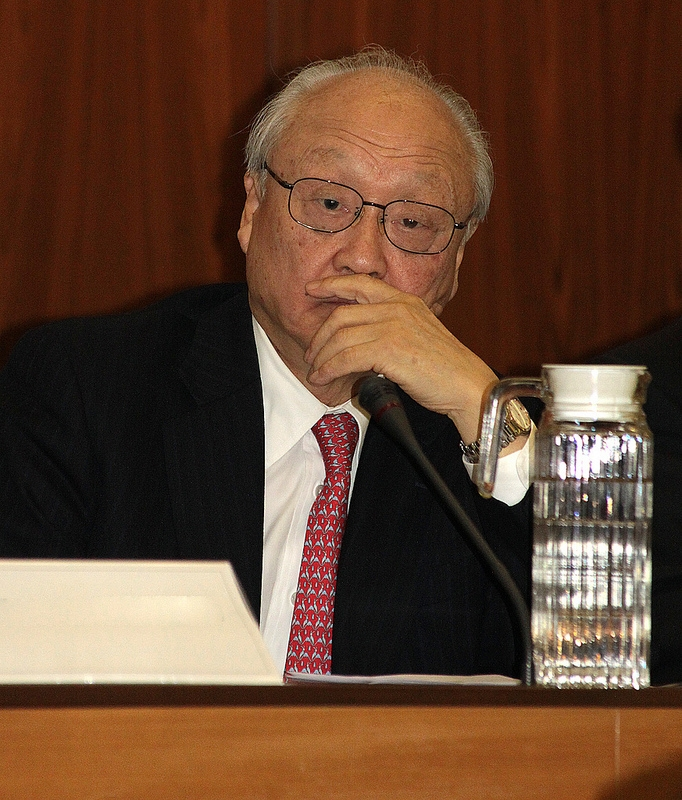

Japanese Ambassador to the United States
- In office 1999–2001
- Preceded by: Kunihiko Saitō
- Succeeded by: Ryōzō Katō

Personal details
- Born: 15 January 1937 (age 89) Tokyo, Japan
- Education: University of Tokyo

Shunji Yanai (柳井 俊二, Yanai Shunji, born 15 January 1937) is a Japanese diplomat who served as ambassador to the United States from 1999 until 2001 and Vice Minister of Foreign Affairs from 1997 to 1999.

After his diplomatic career, he served as a judge at the International Tribunal for the Law of the Sea from 2005 to 2023 and was its president from 2011 to 2014.

== Biography ==
Yanai was born on 15 January 1937 in Tokyo. His father was Hisao Yanai, a diplomat who served as envoy to Colombia and chief of the Treaty Bureau in the Ministry of Foreign Affairs. Yanai was educated at Gakushūin went on to study law at the University of Tokyo. He graduated in 1961 and entered the Ministry of Foreign Affairs. After joining the ministry, he studied at the University of Strasbourg in France.

He was director of the Treaties Bureau during 1991. He served as Vice Minister of Foreign Affairs from 1997 until 1999. He then became ambassador to the United States, and served in the position until 2001. He was removed from his post due to a scandal involving bureaucrats in the Foreign Ministry.

In 2005, he became a judge in the International Tribunal for the Law of the Sea (ITLOS). On 1 October 2011, he was elected to succeed José Luís Jesus as President of the ITLOS for a three-year term.

As part of its strategy of not recognizing the Philippines v. China case, China accused him of manipulating the tribunal's composition.

He headed an advisory panel on Japanese self-defence during both of Shinzō Abe's terms as prime minister. The panel consisted of thirteen security experts, and was concerned with amendments to Article 9 of the Japanese Constitution.

He retired from ITLOS after serving two nine-year terms in September 2023.

Diplomatic posts
| Preceded by Sadayuki Hayashi | Vice Minister for Foreign Affairs; 1997–1999 | Succeeded by Yutaka Kawashima |
| Preceded by Kunihiko Saitō | Japanese Ambassador to the United States; 1999–2001 | Succeeded by Ryōzō Katō |
Legal offices
| Preceded by José Luís Jesus | President of the International Tribunal for the Law of the Sea; 2011–2014 | Succeeded by Vladimir Golitsyn |
