= List of ambassadors of Japan to South Korea =

Japanese Ambassador to the South Korea
- 주한 일본 대사
- Emblem of Japan

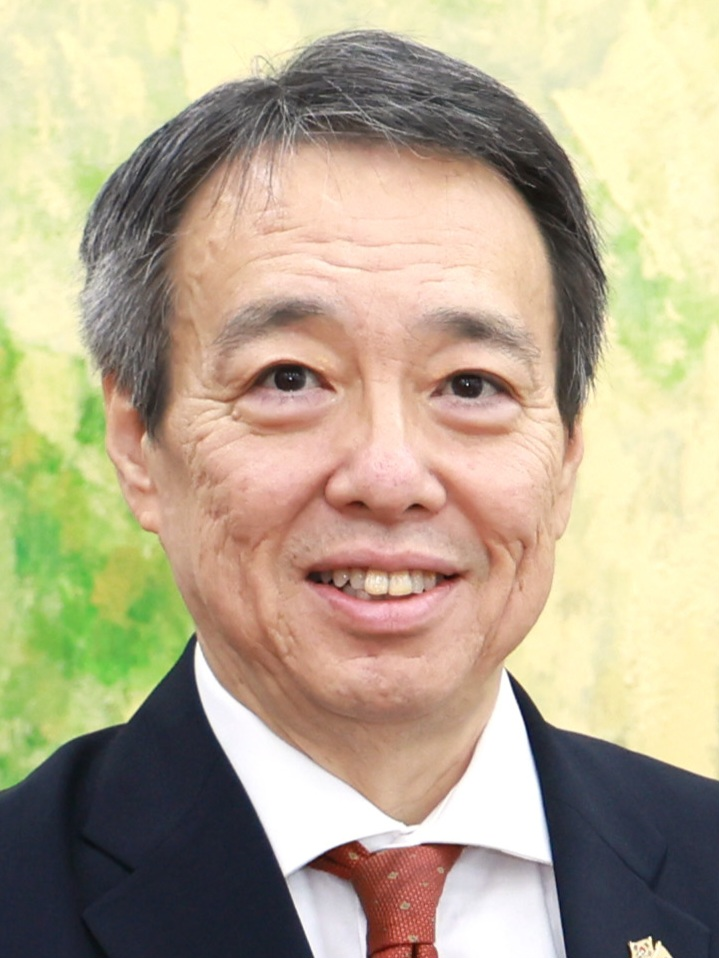
- Incumbent; Koichi Mizushima
- Ministry of Foreign Affairs of Japan
- Term length: Tentative
- First holder: Kuroda Kiyotaka
- Website: http://www.kr.emb-japan.go.jp/

Ambassadors from Japan to South Korea started when Toshikazu Maeda presented his credentials to the Korean government in 1965.

== Title ==
Diplomatic relations were established by the Treaty on Basic Relations between Japan and the Republic of Korea in 1965. The current official title of this diplomat is "Ambassador of Japan to the Republic of Korea."

== History ==
Japanese-Korean diplomatic relations were initially established during the Joseon period of Korean history. When the Japan-Korea Treaty of 1876 was negotiated, diplomatic relations were established on a basis of equality, i.e., "Chosen (Korea) being an independent State enjoys the same sovereign rights as does Japan." Ministers from Japan were appointed in accordance with this treaty. Diplomatic relations between the two neighboring nations were interrupted in 1905, when Empire of Japan made Joseon a protectorate. After Japan was defeated in World War II, Korea was liberated from Japan and gained its independence cited by the 1943 Cairo Declaration. When the first republic of Korea was born, Japan did not acknowledge diplomatic recognition on South Korea. In 1965, diplomatic relations were re-established, as Park Chung Hee and Hayato Ikeda held a summit together.

== List of heads of mission ==
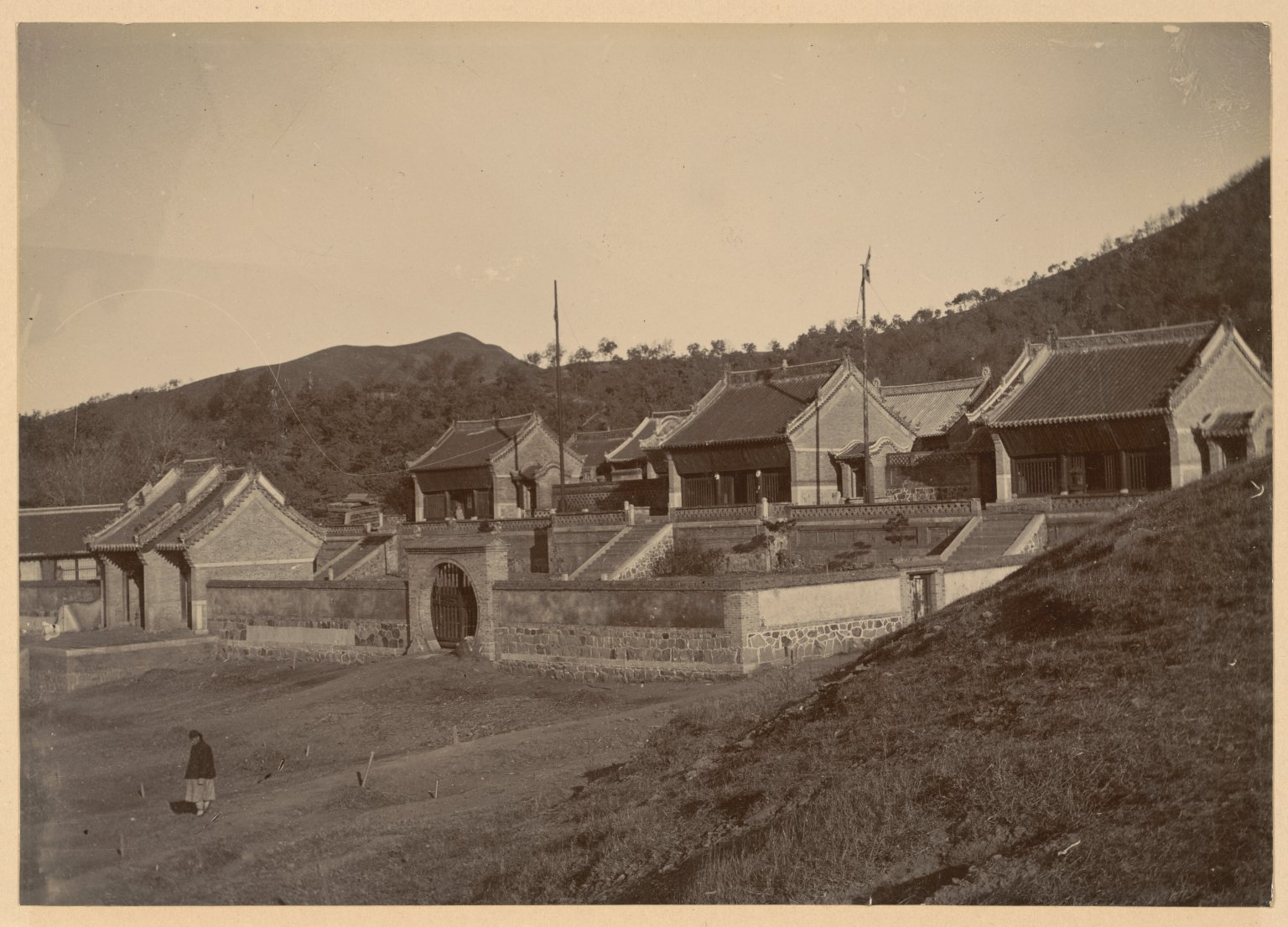
Japanese Consulate in Seoul (1904)

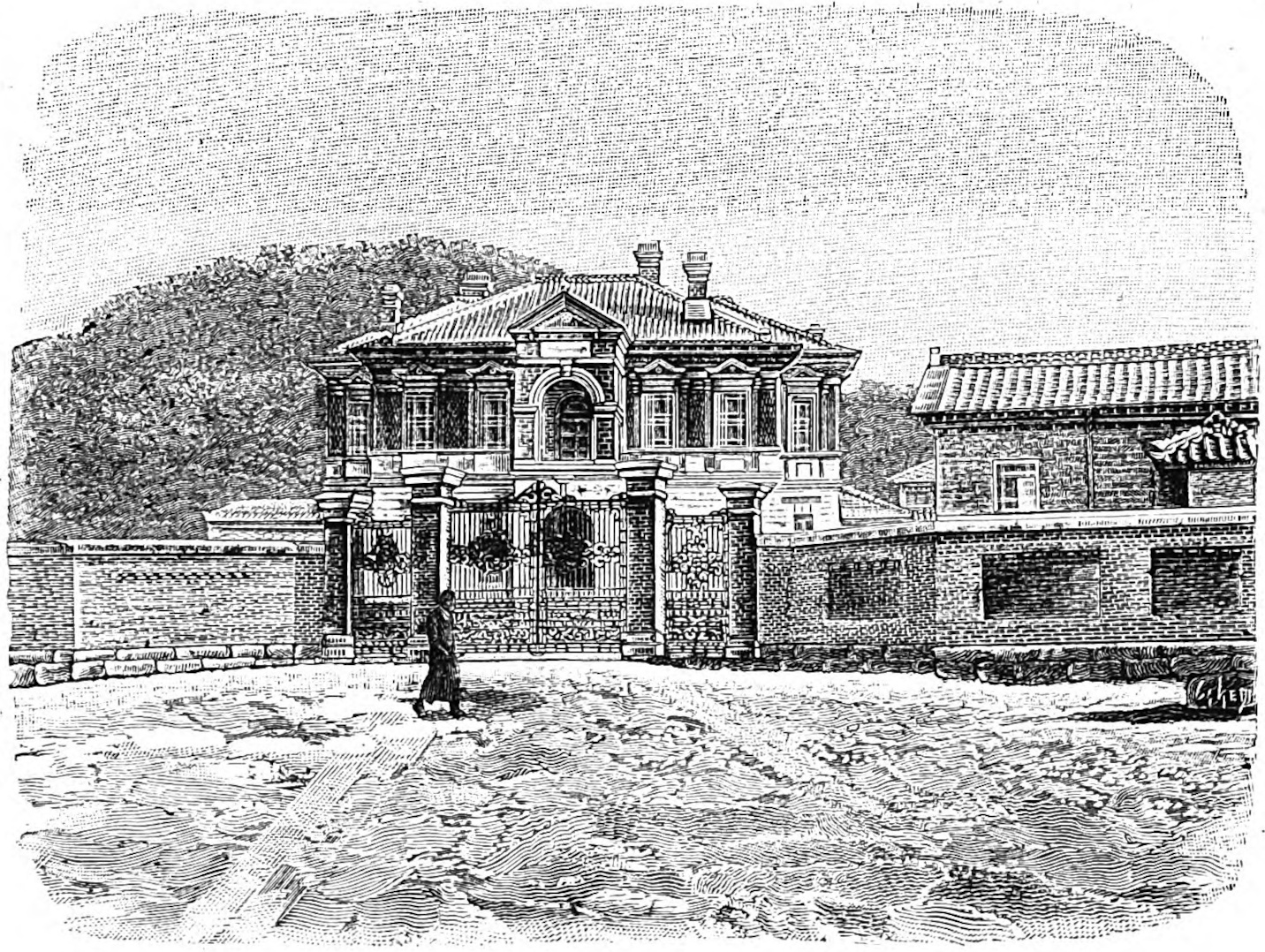
Japanese Legation picture(1901)

=== Chargé d'affairs and Ministers ===
- Kuroda Kiyotaka, Special envoy, 1876-1877
- Hanabusa Yoshitada, appointed chargé d'affairs, November 25, 1877
- S. Takesoye, appointed minister, January 7, 1883
- K. Takahira, appointed chargé d'affairs, June 23, 1885
- T. Kajiyama, appointed minister, April 17, 1891
- M. Oishi, appointed minister, January 25, 1883
- Ōtori Keisuke, appointed minister, September 28, 1893
- Inoue Kaoru, appointed minister, October 26, 1894
- Miura Goro, appointed minister, September 1, 1895
- Komura Jutarō, appointed minister, October 19, 1895
- Hara Takashi, appointed minister, July 7, 1896
- M. Kato, appointed minister, February 24, 1897
- Hayashi Gonsuke, appointed minister, June 25, 1899
- Enjiro Yamaza, appointed chargé d'affairs, February 6, 1901
- Hayashi Gonsuke, appointed chargé d'affairs, February 13, 1903

=== Ambassadors ===
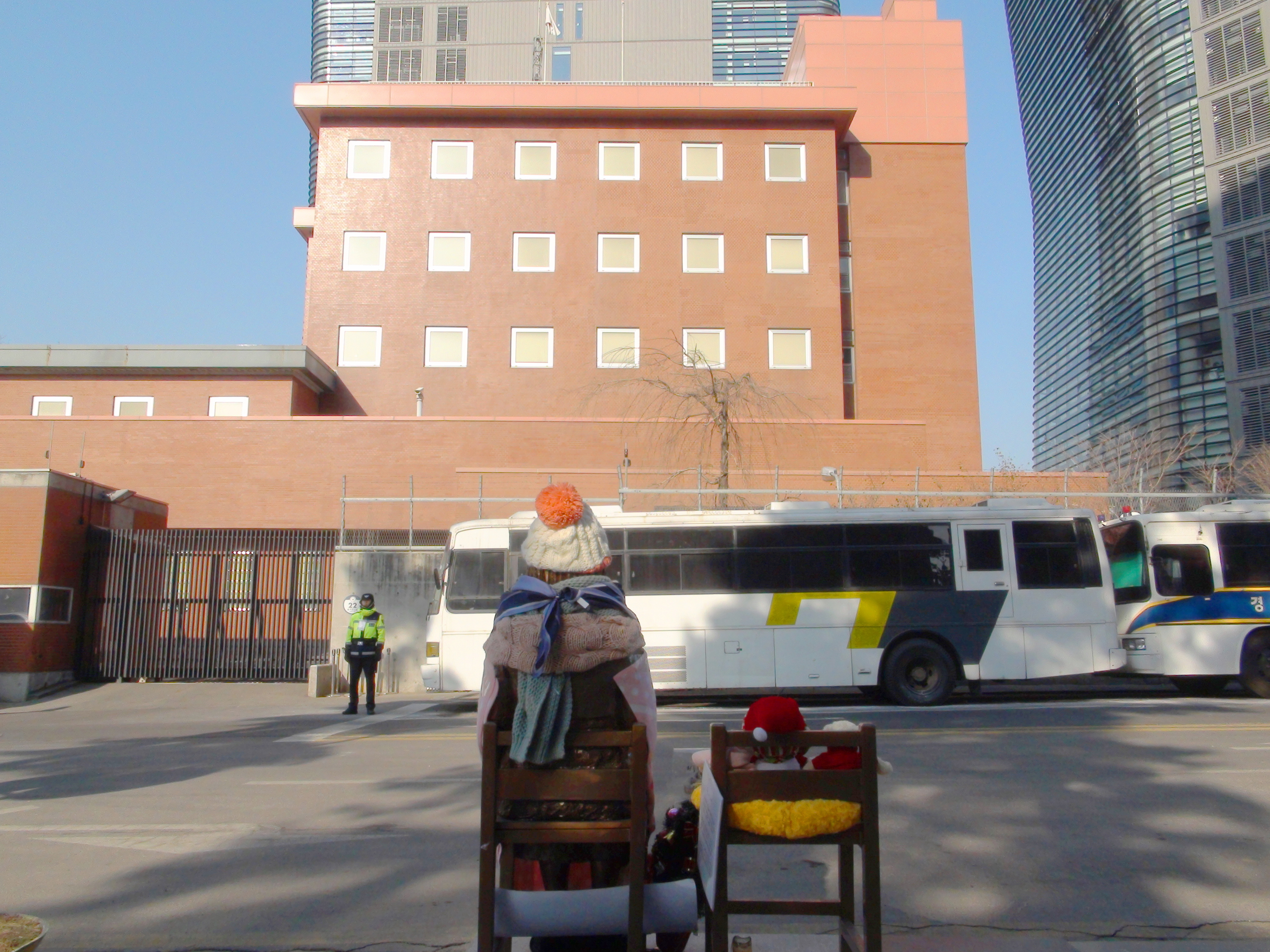
Japanese Embassy in Seoul

- Toshikazu Maeda, 1965-1966
- Shiroshichi Kimura, 1966-1968
- Masahide Kanayama, 1968-1972
- Torao Ushiroku, 1972-1975
- Akira Nishiyama, 1975-1977
- Sunobe Ryoji, 1977-1981
- Toshikazu Maeda, 1981-1984
- Kiyohisa Mikanagi, 1984-1987
- Shinichi Yanai, 1987-1990
- Kenichi Yanagi, 1990-1992
- Toshio Goto, 1992-1994
- Shintaro Yamashita, 1994-1997
- Kazuo Ogoura, 1997-1999
- Terusuke Terada, 2000-2003
- Toshiyuki Takano, 2003-2005.
- Shotaro Oshima, 2005-2007.
- Toshinori Shigeie, 2007-2010
- Masatoshi Muto, 2010-2012
- Koro Bessho, 2012-2016
- Yasumasa Nagamine, 2016-2019
- Koji Tomita, 2019-2021
- Koichi Aiboshi, 2021–2024
- Koichi Mizushima 2024-present

== See also ==
- Japanese embassy in Seoul
- Japan-Korea Treaty of 1876
- List of diplomatic missions in South Korea
