= Takeshi Yasukawa =

Japanese diplomat

Japanese Ambassador to the United States
- In office 1973–1976
- Preceded by: Nobuhiko Ushiba
- Succeeded by: Fumihiko Togo

Personal details
- Died: Tokyo, Japan
- Education: Tokyo Imperial University
- Profession: Diplomat

Takeshi Yasukawa (安川 壮, Yasukawa Takeshi; 1914–2000) was a Japanese career diplomat. He entered the Foreign Ministry in 1939. In 1952 he was appointed Consul General of Japan in Vancouver, British Columbia, and re-opened the consulate after the interruption of World War II. In 1965 he became director general of the North American affairs bureau of the Japanese foreign ministry. After serving as Ambassador to the Philippines, and deputy foreign minister, he became Ambassador to the United States in 1973 in which position he served until 1976. From 1978 to 1980 he served as Japan's trade negotiator under Prime Minister Masayoshi Ohira.

Born February 16, 1914, in Tokyo, he died June 17, 2000, in Tokyo of liver cancer at the age of 86.

He was the father of career United Nations staff member Yoriko Yasukawa.
