= Japan Institute of International Affairs =

Japanese-based think tank

The Japan Institute of International Affairs (abbreviated as JIIA, Japanese: 日本国際問題研究所 nihon kokusai mondai kenkyūjo) is a foreign policy and security think-tank in Japan. It was established in December 1959. It was modelled on the Royal Institute of International Affairs (Chatham House) and other institutions. Japan's Prime Minister Shigeru Yoshida was the first chair of JIIA. Its current chairman is Kenichiro Sasae, the former head of Japan’s Ministry of Foreign Affairs and Ambassador to the United States of America.

According to both Foreign Affairs magazine and the Think Tanks & Civil Societies Program at the Lauder Institute of the University of Pennsylvania, JIIA is Japan's top think tank, and ranked number 1 in the ranking of Top Think Tanks in Asia: China, India, Japan, and the Republic of Korea.

JIIA is a private, nonpartisan policy think tank that examines Japan's foreign policies and makes proposals to the Japanese government. It has published over a hundred books. It also publishes Kokusai Mondai, a monthly Japanese language magazine on foreign affairs. It used to be affiliated with the Ministry of Foreign Affairs.

JIIA organizes forums, symposiums and international conferences where Japanese and international experts discuss and debate Japan's foreign policy and world affairs.

JIIA also conducts research projects on foreign policy issues related to the Asia Pacific region, Northeast Asia, Americas, Europe, Russia and CIS, Middle East and Africa, Security and Globalization.
