= Sadayuki Sakakibara =

Japanese businessman

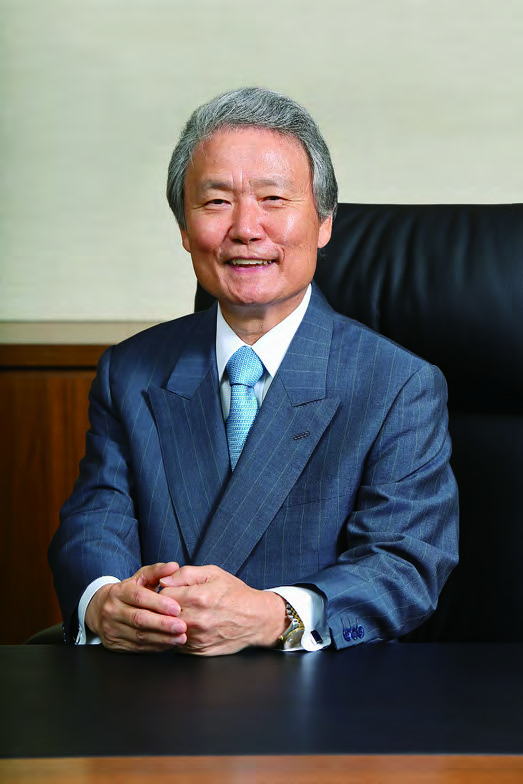

Sadayuki Sakakibara (榊原定征, Sakakibara Sadayuki; born 22 March 1943) is a Japanese businessman who served as chairman of Toray Industries from 2010 to 2015 and chairman of the Japan Business Federation from 2014 to 2018. He is currently Commissioner of Nippon Professional Baseball and chairman of the Kansai Electric Power Company.

== Biography ==
Sakakibara was born on 22 March 1943 in Yokosuka, Kanagawa Prefecture. His father was a submarine captain in the Imperial Japanese Navy and was killed in action the following year. The family then moved to his father's hometown on the Chita Peninsula in Aichi Prefecture, where Sakakibara grew up.

Sakakibara studied applied chemistry at Nagoya University and received a master's degree in 1967. He joined Toray Industries the same year. After distinguishing himself as a technician, he moved to the Corporate Planning Department and rose through the ranks. He became president of Toray Industries in 2002. He stepped down as president and became chairman of the board in 2010, serving in that position until 2015.

In 2014, he was elected chairman of the Japan Business Federation. There had been difficulty choosing a chairman after the first choice, Hitachi chairman Takashi Kawamura, declined. Sakakibara accepted after being persuaded by Shoichiro Toyoda, a fellow Nagoya University alumni. He stepped down in 2018.

Sakakibara was elected chairman of the Kansai Electric Power Company in June 2020. This was intended to improve governance of the company after a bribery scandal. He was also elected Commissioner of Nippon Professional Baseball in December 2022.

Sakakibara was appointed chairman of an expert panel, established in the Ministry of Defense in February 2024, to discuss ways to drastically strengthen Japan’s defense capabilities. The panel submitted its report to Defense Minister Gen Nakatani in September 2025, recommending accelerating defense buildup plans, strengthening the defense industry and expanding equipment exports to friendly nations.
