= Shigeo Yamada =

Japanese diplomat (born 1964)

- 山田 重夫
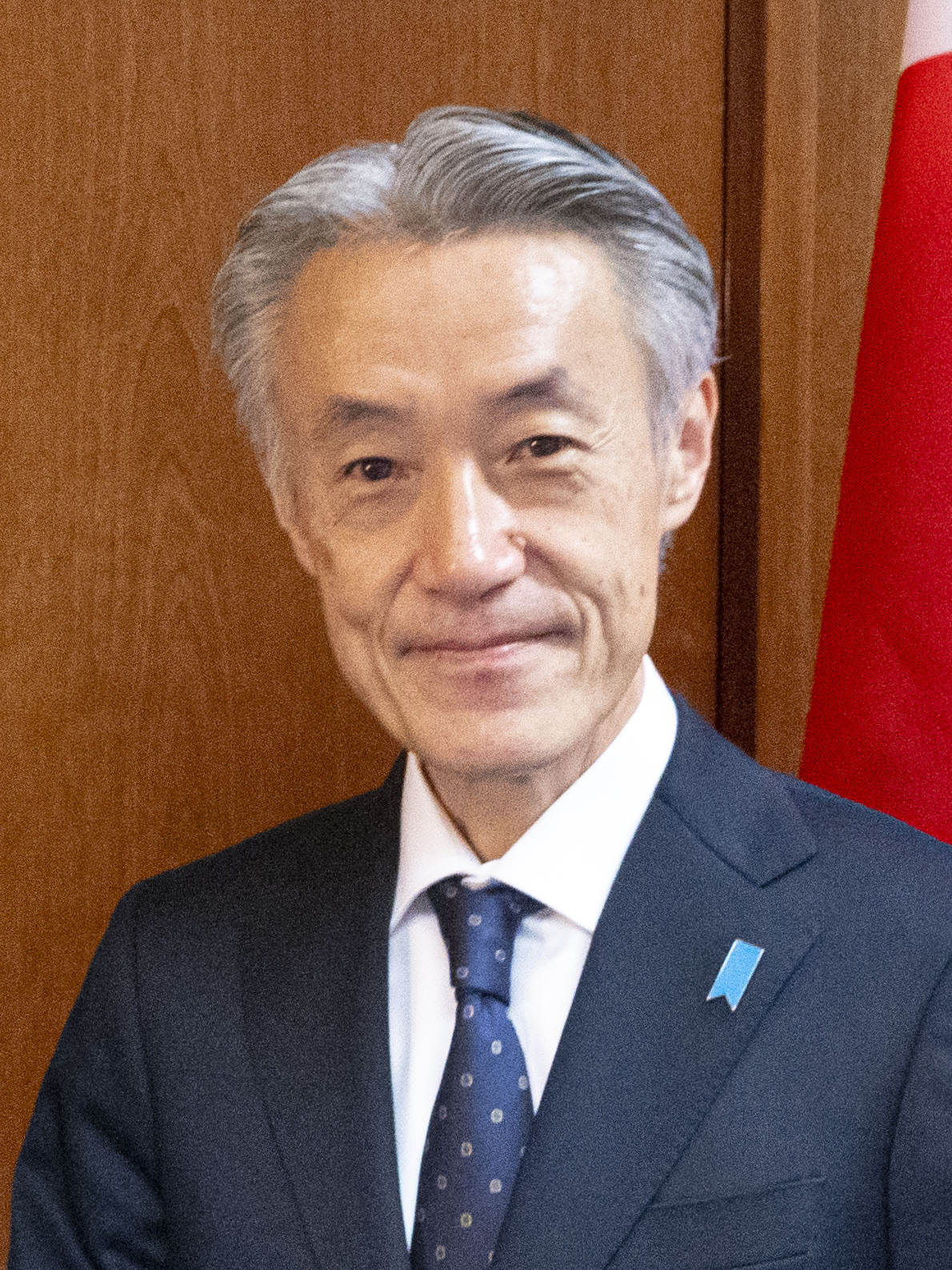
- Yamada in 2023

Japanese Ambassador to the United States
- Incumbent
- Assumed office October 24, 2023
- Prime Minister: Fumio Kishida; Shigeru Ishiba; Sanae Takaichi
- Preceded by: Koji Tomita

Personal details
- Born: July 17, 1964 (age 62) Tokyo, Japan
- Education: Keio University (BA); Carleton College (BA)

Shigeo Yamada (山田 重夫, Yamada Shigeo; born July 17, 1964) is a Japanese diplomat. He has served as Japanese Ambassador to the United States since 2023.

== Early life and education ==
Yamada was born in Tokyo on July 17, 1964. While studying law at Keio University, he passed the foreign service exam and joined the Ministry of Foreign Affairs in 1986. He graduated from Keio University in 1987 with B.A. in Law. In 1987, he was sent to further his education at Carleton College, where he graduated in 1989.

== Career ==
Yamada's earlier diplomatic career included postings in Washington D.C., London and Beijing. From 2012 to 2015 he served as minister for political affairs at the Embassy of Japan in Washington D.C.. After returning to Japan he served as Deputy Director-General for North American Affairs Bureau. In 2016, he was seconded to the National Security Secretariat under Prime Minister Abe, where he was the main point of contact with President Trump's National Security Council. In 2019, he was appointed Deputy Minister for Foreign Affairs for Foreign Policy. He was a confidant of Toshimitsu Motegi who was Foreign Minister from 2019 to 2021.

In 2021 Yamada was appointed Senior Deputy Minister for Foreign Affairs. He played an instrumental role in making Prime Minister Fumio Kishida's surprise visit to Ukraine in March 2023 possible. He was also Political Director during Japan’s presidency of G7 in charge of preparations on strategic and diplomatic agenda for G7 Nagano-Karuizawa Foreign Ministers’ Meeting as well as G7 Hiroshima Summit.

After being appointed to be Japanese Ambassador to the United States in October 2023, he took the position in December 2023. He was reportedly instructed to make connections with the campaign of former President Donald Trump in anticipation for his possible victory in the 2024 United States presidential election.

On 10 April 2024, Yamada was among the guests invited to the state dinner hosted by U.S. President Joe Biden in honor of Prime Minister Fumio Kishida at the White House.

Diplomatic posts
Preceded by Koji Tomita	Japanese Ambassador to the United States; 2023–present	Incumbent
