= Takakazu Kuriyama =

Japanese ambassador (1931-2015)

Takakazu Kuriyama (Japanese: 栗山尚一; died 1 April 2015) was a Japanese diplomat who served as ambassador to Malaysia and the United States.

== Early life and education ==
Kuriyama was born in Tokyo. His father, Kuriyama Shigeru, was a diplomat and judge in the Supreme Court of Japan.

He attended the University of Tokyo.

== Diplomatic career ==
Kuriyama joined the Ministry of Foreign Affairs in 1954. He was involved in the negotiations that led to the 1971 Okinawa Reversion Agreement, which returned the Okinawa Prefecture to Japan from the United States. The next year, he helped draft a statement on normalising diplomacy with China.

He held the position of Director General of the North American Affairs Bureau. He served as ambassador to Malaysia from 1985 to 1987. He was appointed Vice Minister in May 1989. In 1992, he became ambassador to the United States. He left the position in 1995.

== Personal life ==
His wife, Masako, was the daughter of a Japanese Supreme Court judge.

He died on 1 April 2015 in a Tokyo hospital, after suffering from pneumonia.

Diplomatic posts
Preceded by Ryōhei Murata	Japanese Ambassador to the United States; 1992 – 1995	Succeeded by Kunihiko Saitō
Preceded by Ryōhei Murata	Vice Minister for Foreign Affairs; 1989 – 1991	Succeeded by Hisashi Owada
Preceded by Akitane Kiuchi	Japanese Ambassador to Malaysia; 1985 – 1987	Succeeded by Tatsu Nakahira
