= Commissioner of Baseball (NPB) =

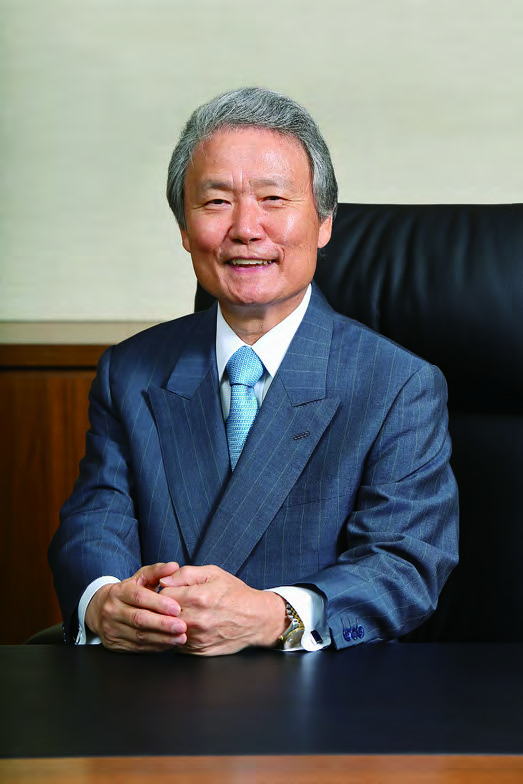
- Incumbent; Sadayuki Sakakibara since December 5, 2022
- Inaugural holder: Morita Fukui
- Formation: 1951

The Commissioner of Baseball is the highest office in Japan's Nippon Professional Baseball (NPB). NPB's current commissioner is Sadayuki Sakakibara.

== History ==
Matsutarō Shōriki, media mogul and owner of the Yomiuri Giants, was instrumental in the formation of NPB in 1949–1950, and acted unofficially as the league's first commissioner in 1950.

Ichiro Yoshikuni has been the longest-serving commissioner, in office from 1989–1998.

In September 2013, three-term Commissioner Ryozo Kato was forced to resign when it was revealed that the baseballs used during the 2013 Nippon Professional Baseball season were "juiced" in secret, though Kato claimed to not know about the change. The livelier ball resulted in a marked increase in home runs league-wide, including Tokyo Yakult Swallows outfielder Wladimir Balentien breaking the cherished NPB single-season home run record of 55, previously held by professional baseball's all-time home run leader Sadaharu Oh.

== Commissioners ==
1. Morita Fukui (1951–1954)
2. Nobori Inon (1956–1962)
3. Yushi Uchimura (1962–1965)
4. Toshiyoshi Miyazawa (1965–1971)
5. Nobumoto Ohama (1971–1976)
6. Toshi Kaneko (1976–1979)
7. Takeso Shimoda (1979–1985)
8. Juhei Takeuchi (1985–1988)
9. Ichiro Yoshikuni (1989–1998)
10. Hiromori Kawashima (1998–2004)
11. Yasuchika Negoro (2004–2007)
12. Ryozo Kato (2008–2014)
13. Katsuhiko Kumazaki (2014–2017)
14. Atsushi Saito (2017–2022)
15. Sadayuki Sakakibara (2023–present)
