= Nobuhiko Ushiba =

Japanese diplomat (1909–1984)

Japanese Ambassador to the United States
- In office 1970–1973
- Preceded by: Takeso Shimoda
- Succeeded by: Takeshi Yasukawa

Japanese Ambassador to Canada
- In office 1961–1964

Personal details
- Born: 16 November 1909 Kobe, Japan
- Died: 31 December 1984 (aged 75) Tokyo, Japan
- Spouse: Fujiko Kobayashi Ushiba
- Children: One son, three daughters
- Education: Tokyo Imperial University
- Profession: Diplomat

Nobuhiko Ushiba (牛場 信彦, Ushiba Nobuhiko; 16 November 1909 – 31 December 1984) was a Japanese diplomat who served as Ambassador to Canada from 1961 to 1964, Ambassador to the United States from 1970 to 1973, and as Minister of State for External Economic Affairs from 1977 to 1979. The last was a position in the Cabinet of Japan created specially for him.

== Life and career ==
=== Early life and WWII career ===
Nobuhiko Ushiba was born 16 November 1909 in the city of Kobe in Japan. His grandfather was an executive with the San'yō Railway (which had its headquarters in Kobe). His father was a silk merchant whose business failed under pressure from low-cost imports. His second cousin was Haru Matsukata, who later married the United States Ambassador to Japan Edwin O. Reischauer (1961 to 1966). Nobuhiko was the third son in the family, and his older brother, Tomohiko Ushiba, later was private secretary to Prince Fumimaro Konoe. He did not attend school until his parents moved to Tokyo soon after the Taishō period began in July 1912. He graduated from two of the city's most prestigious public schools, the First Middle School and the First High School (now the Tokyo University of Agriculture First High School). Due to Japan's growing ties with the German Empire and his father's experience in international trade, he became somewhat fluent in the German language in high school.

Ushiba then entered the Tokyo Imperial University, where he graduated in 1932 with a degree in law. He was a championship rower, and just missed qualifying for the 1932 Summer Olympics. Ushiba did not aspire to a career in the foreign service, but with a worldwide depression depressing job prospects, his fluency in German, and his family's experience in international trade, he entered the diplomatic corps after graduation. (Had he qualified for the Olympics, he would have been unable to sit for his foreign service qualifying exam.)

He received an appointment as first secretary at the Japanese Embassy in Berlin, and served there until the end of World War II (with a brief stint in the Japanese embassy in London just prior to the outbreak of the war). He was very close to General Hiroshi Ōshima, Japan's ambassador to Nazi Germany. By at least 1939, he was helping to run a "bureaucratic intelligence service" which spied on Nazi Germany for the Japanese government. He made at least one trip back to Japan during the height of the war. He flew from Berlin to Turkey (then a neutral nation), then pass over the Caucasus, the Caspian Sea, and Siberia before reaching Japan. In early 1944, he tried to persuade Prince Naruhiko Higashikuni, an Imperial Japanese Army general and commander of the General Defense Command, that Japan was losing World War II and should negotiate with the United States.

=== Early post-war career ===
Ushiba's foreign service career faltered badly in the post-war period due to his close association with General Ōshima and his service in Germany. Although he was never formally purged from the service, he quit. He served as Ōshima's defense counsel during the Tokyo War Crimes Trials, and then went into private business. He and some friends attempted to import Malaysian iron ore, but their business quickly failed. He was rehabilitated and brought back into the foreign service by Shigeru Yoshida, Prime Minister of Japan, who knew him when Yoshida was Japan's ambassador to the United Kingdom just before the war.

Ushiba's post-war career was heavily involved in economics. Upon his return to government service, he was appointed to Japan's Foreign Exchange Control Board in 1949, where as chief of the secretariat he supervised the investment of foreign funds in industries that were essential to Japan's economic recovery. He was appointed Director-General of the International Trade Bureau in Japan's Ministry of International Trade and Industry in 1951. He was appointed a counsellor in the Ministry of Foreign Affairs in 1954, and later that year served as a delegate to the Japan-Sweden trade talks.

Ushiba's overseas service began in 1955, when he was appointed deputy minister in Japan's embassy in Rangoon, Burma. In January 1957, he left Burma and was appointed Consul-General at the Japanese Consulate General in New York City. That same year, he was elevated from counsellor to Chief of the Economic Division at the Ministry of Foreign Affairs, a position which he held until 23 June 1964, when he was promoted to Deputy Vice Minister for Foreign Affairs. He held that position until 14 April 1967.

Ushiba was appointed Ambassador to Canada in 1961, serving until 1964. He left that position to lead the Japanese delegation to the Kennedy Round of the General Agreement on Tariffs and Trade, which lasted from 1964 to 1967. When the Kennedy Round ended, Ushiba returned to Tokyo and was promoted to Vice-Minister for Foreign Affairs in April 1967, the highest position possible for a career official.

=== U.S. ambassadorship and later career ===
Ushiba was appointed Ambassador to the United States on 10 July 1970, and presented his credentials on 21 September.

Ushiba's term as ambassador was tumultuous. He himself believed that the fundamental relationship between Japan and the United States was changing. Although the relationship remained exceptionally strong, in the past Japan had asked the United States to do things for it. Now, Ushiba felt, Japan was in a position to do much more economically for developing nations in Southeast Asia, and was being asked to do favors for the United States economically (such as permit more imports and lower trade barriers). Ushiba also had to handle the fallout from several major American foreign policy decisions. As The Washington Post put it: Ushiba's ambassadorship "is remembered as a tumultuous time in the two countries' relations, due to the two 'Nixon shocks' — detente with China and the devaluation of the dollar." A treaty ending the American military occupation of Okinawa was signed by him in June 1971. But despite an agreement to permit additional U.S.-made textiles to be sold in Japan (signed in January 1972) as well as a general Japanese willingness to lower trade barriers and assist American companies in gaining market share, the Nixon administration imposed stringent new restrictions on imports despite Ushiba's pleas.

Ushiba retired from the foreign service in 1973 and returned to Japan. He served as an advisor to the Foreign Ministry, and became more active in politics. In November 1977, Prime Minister Takeo Fukuda appointed him Minister of State for External Economic Affairs, a cabinet post that was created specially for him. Within two months, he negotiated and signed a major agreement easing trade tensions between the U.S. and Japan which was widely hailed. In 1978 and 1979, he led the Japanese delegation to the Tokyo Round of GATT talks.

Ushiba resigned as minister on 31 July 1979. The Japanese government immediately appointed him chair of the Japan-U.S. Economic Relations Group, a commission set up by the governments of Japan and the United States to study trade issues affecting the two nations. The commission changed its name to the Japan-U.S. Advisory Commission in 1983.

=== Personal life and death ===
Nobuhiko Ushiba was a tall man of rugged build, and an avid sportsman. He married Fujiko Kobayashi, and the couple had four children (a son and three daughters).

Ushiba died of an unspecified liver problem at a Tokyo hospital on 31 December 1984. His wife and four children survived him. The same day he died, the Government of Japan conferred the Order of the Paulownia Flowers, the highest regularly conferred honor in the Japanese honors system.

== In popular culture ==
Jirō Shirasu (白洲次郎, Shirasu Jirō) is a 2009 made-for-television motion picture about Jirō Shirasu, a government official who famously demanded respect from General Douglas MacArthur in a Christmas 1945 meeting. The role of Nobuhiko Ushiba was played by actor Kanji Ishimaru.

On 13 October 1986, the Ushiba Memorial Foundation was established to provide research and new thinking on issues of global trade. It is headquartered in the former Moral Re-Armament headquarters in the Nishi-Azabu District in Tokyo.

== Bibliography ==
- The Asia Who's Who. Hong Kong: Pan-Asia Newspaper Alliance. 1958.
- Barnhart, Michael A. (2007). "A Secondary Affair: United States Economic Foreign Policy and Japan, 1945–1968". In Caprio, Mark E.; Sugita, Yoneyuki (eds.). Democracy in Occupied Japan: The U.S. Occupation and Japanese Politics and Society. New York: Routledge. ISBN 9781134118625.
- Davis, Glenn; Roberts, John G. (2012). An Occupation Without Troops: America's Japan Lobby and Its Puppets Inside Japan's Government. New York: Tuttle Publishing. ISBN 9781462903702.
- Gatz, Karen L.; Keefer, Edward C. (2006). Foreign Relations of the United States, 1964-1968. Volume XXIX, Part 2, Japan. Washington, D.C.: U.S. Department of State. ISBN 0160725097.
- Hoyt, Edwin Palmer (2001). Warlord: Tojo Against the World. New York: Cooper Square Press. ISBN 0812840178.
- London, Nancy (1991). Japanese Corporate Philanthropy. New York: Oxford University Press. ISBN 0195064240.
- Mathias, Regine (1990). Deutschland-Japan in der Zwischenkriegszeit. Bonn, Germany: Bouvier. ISBN 3416022076.
- Nish, Ian Hill (2007). Japanese Envoys in Britain, 1862-1964: A Century of Diplomatic Exchange. Folkestone, UK: Global Oriental. ISBN 9781905246328.
- Rix, Alan (1989). Ushiba Nobuhiko: A Japanese "Economic Diplomat". Pacific Economic Papers, no. 170. Canberra, Australia: Research School of Pacific Studies, Australian National University. ISBN 9780864130778.
- Shillony, Ben-Ami (1981). Politics and Culture in Wartime Japan. Oxford, UK: Clarendon. ISBN 0198215738.
- Welfield, John (2012). An Empire in Eclipse: Japan in the Postwar American Alliance System. London: Bloomsbury Academic. ISBN 978-0485113341.
- Yokoi, Noriko (2004). Japan's Postwar Economic Recovery and Anglo-Japanese Relations, 1948-1962. New York: Routledge. ISBN 9781134432431.

Diplomatic posts
Preceded by Takeso Shimoda	Japanese Ambassador to the United States; 1970 - 1973	Succeeded by Takeshi Yasukawa
