= Kunihiko Saitō =

Japanese politician (1935–2022)

Kunihiko Saitō (Japanese: 斎藤 邦彦; 2 February 1935 – 4 July 2022) was a Japanese politician who served as ambassador to the United States.

He was ambassador to the United States from 1995 until 1999. He served as head of the Japan International Cooperation Agency until August 2001, when he was succeeded by Takao Kawakami. He was removed from his position due to a scandal involving ministry bureaucrats, alongside Vice Minister Yutaka Kawashima, Ambassador Shunji Yanai, and Ambassador Sadayuki Hayashi.

Diplomatic posts
Preceded by Takakazu Kuriyama	Japanese Ambassador to the United States; 1995–1999	Succeeded by Shunji Yanai
