= Ryōzō Katō =

Japanese lawyer and diplomat

- 加藤 良三
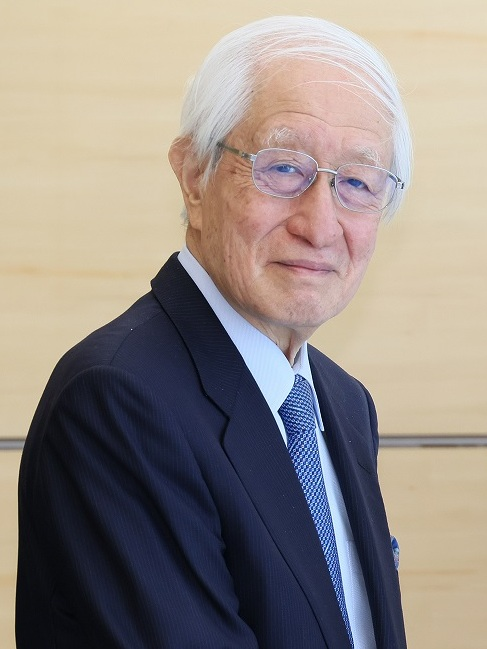

Japanese Ambassador to the United States
- In office 2001–2008
- Preceded by: Shunji Yanai
- Succeeded by: Ichirō Fujisaki

Commissioner of Japanese Baseball
- In office 18 June 2008 – 25 June 2013
- Preceded by: Yasuchika Negoro
- Succeeded by: Katsuhiko Kumazaki

Personal details
- Born: September 13, 1941 (age 84) Yurihonjō, Japan
- Profession: Diplomat

Ryozo Kato (加藤 良三, Katō Ryōzō; born September 13, 1941) is a Japanese lawyer and diplomat who served as the Japanese Ambassador to the United States from 2001 to 2008, and as the Commissioner of Nippon Professional Baseball from 2008 to 2013.

== Career ==
Kato graduated from the Faculty of Law of the University of Tokyo and Yale Law School. He worked in the Ministry of Foreign Affairs and served his country in Australia, Egypt, and the United States, in addition to multiple global assignments within the Ministry in Tokyo.

Kato served in the United States as the Third Secretary in the Embassy (1967–1969), Minister in the Embassy (1987–1990), and Consul-General in San Francisco (1992–1994). He returned to Japan to serve as the Director-General of the Asian Affairs Bureau (1995–1997) and the Deputy-General of the Foreign Policy Bureau (1997–1999). After serving as the Deputy Minister for Foreign Affairs (1999–2001), he was appointed the Ambassador of Japan to the United States of America from 2001 to 2008. He has been recognized and respected on both sides of the Pacific for his outstanding understanding of the issues and his clarity in direction to resolve them. In 2007, Kato warned in the letter that Japanese-American relations could suffer serious, long-term harm if the House of Representatives passed Resolution 121.

Kato became the Commissioner of Nippon Professional Baseball in Tokyo in 2008. He resigned in 2013 after it was found that the baseballs used during the 2013 Nippon Professional Baseball season were "juiced" in secret, though Kato claimed to not know about the change.

== See also ==
- Tsuneo Watanabe
- Yomiuri Shimbun

Diplomatic posts
Preceded by Shunji Yanai	Japanese Ambassador to the United States; 2001–2008	Succeeded by Ichirō Fujisaki
Sporting positions
Preceded by Yasuchika Negoro	Commissioner of Baseball (NPB); 2008–2013	Succeeded by Katsuhiko Kumazaki
