= Ichiro Yoshikuni =

Japanese baseball executive

Ichiro Yoshikuni (特別 吉國 一郎 September 2, 1916 – September 2, 2011) was a Japanese baseball executive. He served as the Commissioner of Baseball in Nippon Professional Baseball from 1989 to 1998. The longest-serving NPB commissioner, he is a member of the Japanese Baseball Hall of Fame.

== Life ==
He was born in Yokohama City. He joined the Ministry of Commerce and Industry in 1940, having gone there from previously being in Faculty of Law at the University of Tokyo. He worked in legal affair agencies before becoming director of the Cabinet Legislation Bureau in 1972. He later became president of the Regional Promotion and Development Corporation until 1984. In 1989, he was appointed as the ninth commissioner of NPB, which he served from 1989 to 1998. He was noted in trying to bridge the gap between the amateur ranks and NPB, which led to the launch of the All Japan Baseball Conference, a joint pro-am association. He also made steps to try and reform the free agent system and draft orders. He was quoted in 1991 as stating, "We don’t think of the relationship between owners and players as a labor issue. It’s more like the relationship between a parent and child.” The first player to seek arbitration occurred during his tenure with Hiromitsu Ochiai in 1991, where he (alongside the heads of the Pacific and Central League) ruled in favor of the team. His nine-year tenure was the longest for a commissioner.

He died at his home in Shibuya-ku, Tokyo on September 2, 2011, from pneumonia at the age of 95.

Sporting positions
Preceded by Juhei Takeuchi	Commissioner of Baseball (NPB); 1989-1998	Succeeded by Hiromori Kawashima
