= Takeso Shimoda =

Japanese diplomat

- 下田 武三

Japanese Ambassador to the United States
- In office 28 June 1967 – September 1970
- Preceded by: Ryūji Takeuchi
- Succeeded by: Nobuhiko Ushiba

Personal details
- Born: April 3, 1907 Tokyo, Japan
- Died: January 22, 1995 (aged 87) Tokyo, Japan

Takeso Shimoda (下田 武三, Shimoda Takezō; 3 April 1907 – 22 January 1995) was a Japanese diplomat who served as ambassador to the United States and a justice in the Supreme Court of Japan.

== Career ==
Shimoda served as vice foreign minister (a bureaucratic appointment) within the Japanese Foreign Ministry.

He was involved in the revision of the 1951 Security Treaty Between the United States and Japan.

Shimoda served as ambassador to the United States from 28 June 1967 until September 1970. He was a signatory of the Treaty on the Non-Proliferation of Nuclear Weapons on 3 February 1970.

From 12 January 1971 until 2 April 1977, he served as a justice in the Supreme Court of Japan.

== Baseball career ==
He was commissioner of Nippon Professional Baseball from March 1979 until 1985. His predecessor, Toshi Kaneko, resigned after a trade scandal.

== Personal life ==
Shimoda had a wife, Mitsue, a son, and two daughters.

Shimoda died from heart failure on 22 January 1995 in Tokyo.

Diplomatic posts
| Preceded by Ryūji Takeuchi | Japanese Ambassador to the United States; 28 June 1967– September 1970 | Succeeded by Nobuhiko Ushiba |
Sporting positions
| Preceded by Toshi Kaneko | Commissioner of Baseball (NPB); 1979–1985 | Succeeded by Juhei Takeuchi |
