= Morita Fukui =

Japanese baseball commissioner (1885–1965)

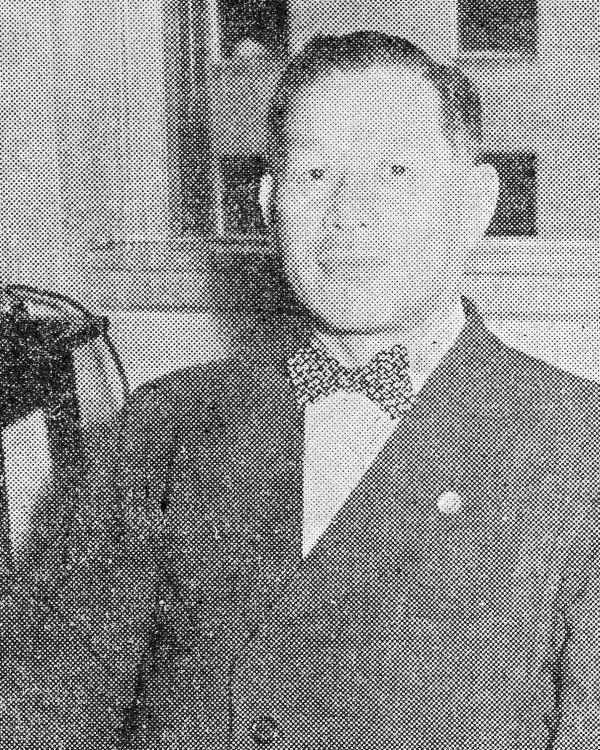
Image of Fukui Morita

Morita Fukui (July 14, 1885 – December 27, 1965) was the first Commissioner of Baseball in Japan. (Matsutarō Shōriki, media mogul and owner of the Yomiuri Giants, was instrumental in the formation of Nippon Professional Baseball in 1949–1950, and acted unofficially as the league's first commissioner in 1950.) A lawyer, prosecutor, politician, Fukui was sworn in as Commissioner in 1951.

Sporting positions
Preceded by N.A.	Commissioner of Baseball (NPB); 1951-1954	Succeeded by Nobori Inon
