= Kenichirō Sasae =

Japanese diplomat (born 1951)

Ken'ichirō Sasae
- 佐々江 賢一郎
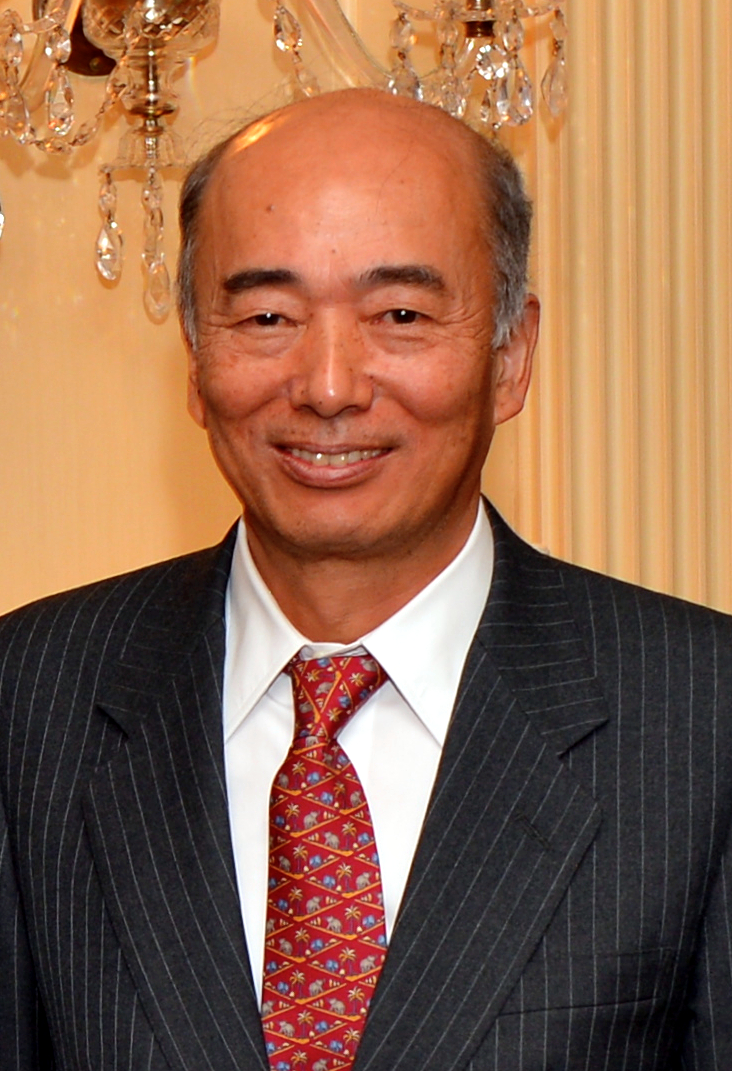

Japanese Ambassador to the United States
- In office September 2012 – March 2018
- Preceded by: Ichirō Fujisaki
- Succeeded by: Shinsuke J. Sugiyama

Personal details
- Born: September 25, 1951 (age 75) Kurashiki, Okayama, Japan
- Education: University of Tokyo (B.L. in 1974)

Kenichiro Sasae (佐々江 賢一郎, Sasae Ken'ichirō) is a retired Japanese diplomat who served as Vice Minister for Foreign Affairs from 2010 to 2012 and Japan's ambassador to the United States from 2012 to 2018. He is currently President of the Japan Institute of International Affairs.

== Career ==
Kenichiro Sasae was born on 25 September 1951 in Kurashiki, Okayama Prefecture. In his youth he was an avid reader of the works of Ryotaro Shiba and aspired to become a novelist himself, but he abandoned this idea as a student. Sasae studied law at the University of Tokyo and joined the Ministry of Foreign Affairs in April 1974 after graduating.

After joining the Ministry he was sent to the United States to further his education at Swarthmore College. His early career included a posting at the embassy to the United States and various internal positions in ministry. He became a counsellor at the embassy to the United Kingdom in 1993, and served concurrently as a research associate at the International Institute for Strategic Studies in London. The following year he was assigned as counsellor to the permanent mission in Geneva while also serving as special adviser to Sadako Ogata, the United Nations High Commissioner for Refugees.

He later served in a number of key diplomatic positions dealing with Japan's foreign policy toward Asia, including as Director of the Northeast Asia Division and Director-General of the Asian and Oceania Affairs Bureau. He was representative of Japan during the six-party talks to find a peaceful resolution to the security concerns as a result of the North Korean nuclear weapons program. Sasae was appointed Administrative Vice Minister for Foreign Affairs in August 2010. That month he voiced regret over anti-Japanese protests in China in relation to the Senkaku Islands dispute.

Sasae was appointed Ambassador to the United States in September 2012.

After retiring from public service in 2018, Sasae was elected president of the Japan Institute of International Affairs. In late 2022, he chaired a government advisory panel to consider the strengthening of defense capabilities. Sasae delivered the report to Prime Minister Fumio Kishida in November 2022, recommending an increase in defense spending and the development of counterstrike capabilities.

Diplomatic posts
Preceded by Mitoji Yabunaka	Deputy Foreign Minister for Political Affairs; 2008-2010	Succeeded by Koro Bessho
Preceded by Mitoji Yabunaka	Administrative Vice Minister for Foreign Affairs; 2010-2012	Succeeded by Chikao Kawai
Preceded by Ichirō Fujisaki	Japanese Ambassador to the United States; 2012-2018	Succeeded by Shinsuke Sugiyama
Non-profit organization positions
Preceded by Yoshiji Nogami	President of the Japan Institute of International Affairs; 2018-present	Incumbent
