= Shinsuke J. Sugiyama =

Japanese diplomat (born 1953)

His Excellency Shinsuke J. Sugiyama
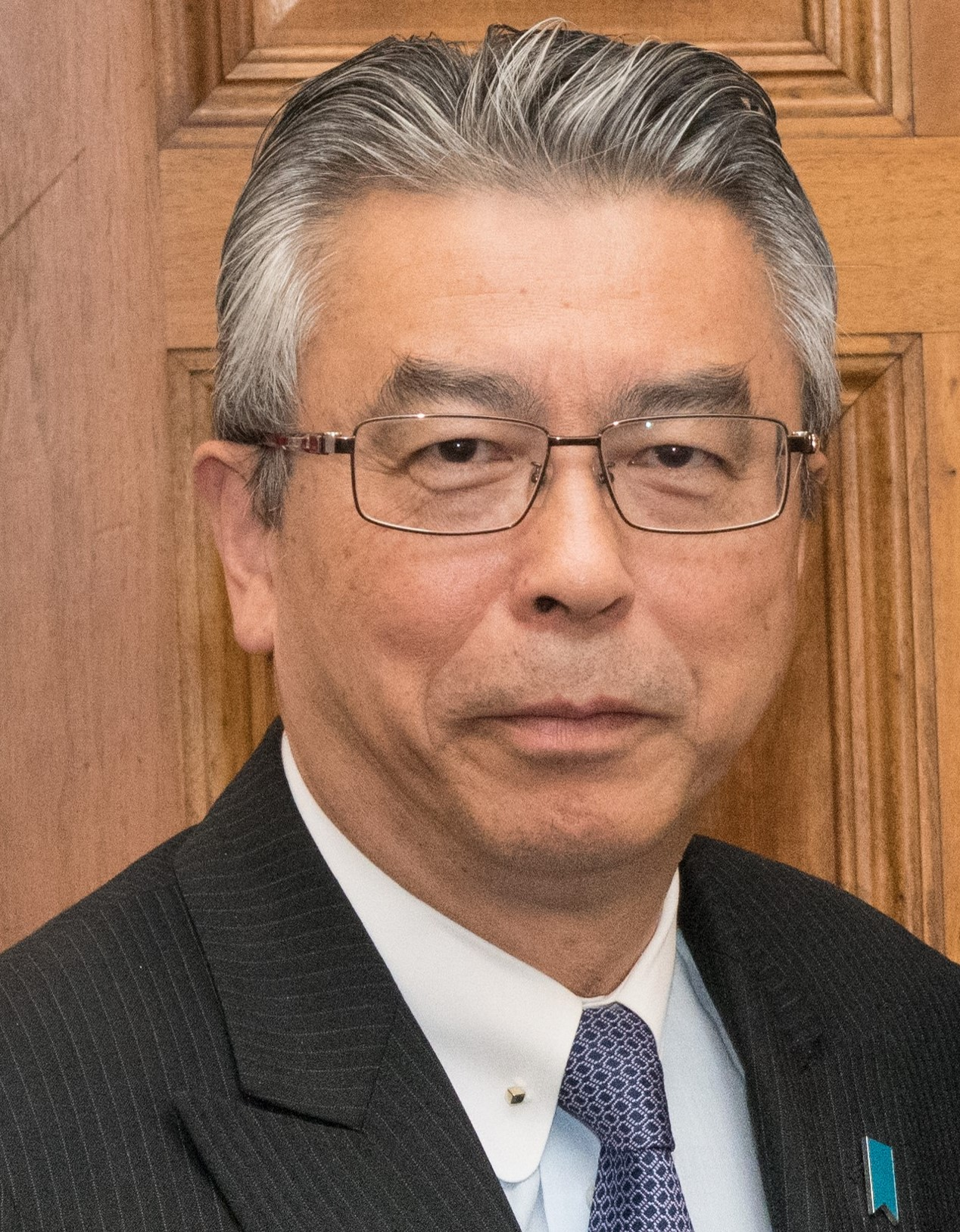

Japanese Ambassador to the United States
- In office March 28, 2018 – December 25, 2020
- Prime Minister: Shinzo Abe; Yoshihide Suga
- Preceded by: Kenichirō Sasae
- Succeeded by: Koji Tomita

Personal details
- Born: May 14, 1953 (age 73) Aichi Prefecture, Japan
- Spouse: Yoko Elizabeth Sugiyama (d. 2020)
- Children: 2

Shinsuke J. Sugiyama (杉山 晋輔, Sugiyama Shinsuke) is a Japanese diplomat who formerly served as Japanese ambassador to the United States. He was previously administrative vice minister for foreign affairs.

== Career ==
Sugiyama passed the official exam for foreign affairs in October 1976, enrolling in law school at Waseda University in March of the following year, but dropping out the next month to join the Ministry of Foreign Affairs. In 1978, he traveled to the United Kingdom to study English for two years at Oxford University.

His career as a diplomat has included a previous tour in Washington as well postings in Nigeria, Egypt and South Korea, along with a prior assignment to Washington from 1989 to 1992, when he was first secretary in the economics section of the Japanese embassy.

In 2016, Sugiyama stated to a U.N. panel that the Japanese government had found no documents confirming that comfort women had been forcibly recruited by the military or government. He claimed belief in forcible recruitment was based on false accounts of the writer Seiji Yoshida.

In late 2017, he was selected to become ambassador to the United States. He pledged to work with American officials to resolve issues with North Korea, including the nation's nuclear arsenal and abductions of Japanese citizens. He presented his credentials to President Donald Trump on March 28, 2018. As ambassador, he helped negotiate an agricultural trade pact with American officials.

== Personal life ==
Sugiyama was married for nearly 40 years to Yoko Elizabeth Sugiyama, who died in 2020 of apparent heart failure at their Tokyo home while recovering from a stomach ulcer. She was 66.

Their daughter, Reina, is a fashion designer in New York. Their son, Shunsuke, lives in Japan with his wife and four children.

Sugiyama is Anglican.

Government offices
Preceded by Akitaka Saiki	Administrative Vice Minister for Foreign Affairs; 2016–2018	Succeeded by Takeo Akiba
Diplomatic posts
Preceded by Kenichirō Sasae	Japanese Ambassador to the United States; 2018-2021	Succeeded by Koji Tomita
