= Embassy of Japan, Washington, D.C. =

Embassy of Japan
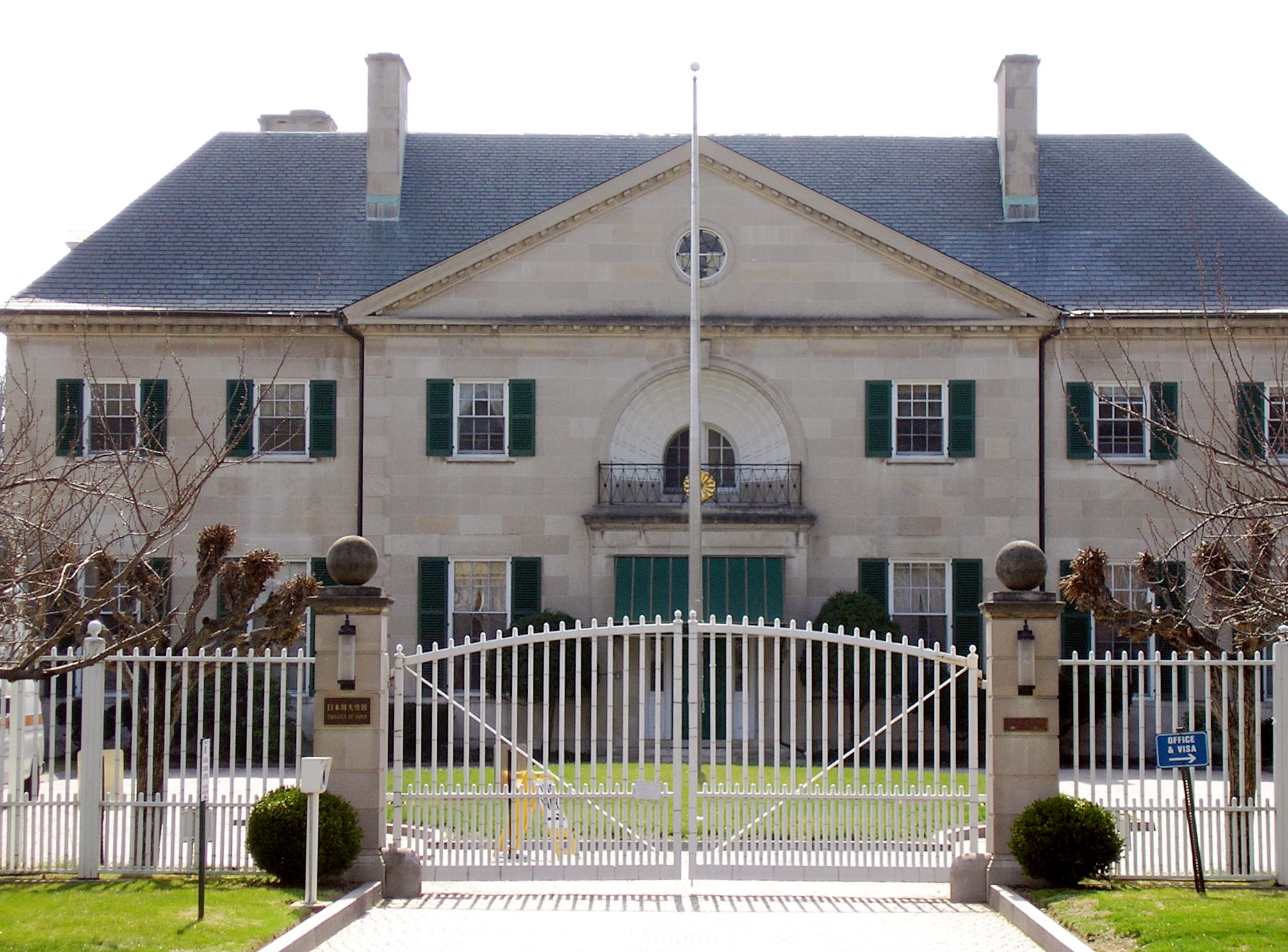
- Embassy of Japan in 2007
- Location: Washington, D.C.
- Address: 2520 Massachusetts Avenue NW
- Coordinates: 38°54′56″N 77°3′22″W
- Ambassador: Shigeo Yamada
- Website: www.us.emb-japan.go.jp

- Japanese Embassy
- U.S. National Register of Historic Places
- Built: 1931
- Architect: Delano & Aldrich
- NRHP reference No.: 73002092
- Designated: February 20, 1973

The Embassy of Japan in Washington, D.C. (在アメリカ合衆国日本国大使館, Zai Amerika Gasshūkoku Nihonkoku Taishikan; lit. 'Embassy of Japan in the United States of America') is the diplomatic mission of Japan to the United States. It is located at 2520 Massachusetts Avenue NW, Washington, D.C., in the Embassy Row neighborhood. In addition to serving as Japan's diplomatic mission in the United States, the embassy provides Japanese consular services to residents of the District of Columbia, Virginia, and Maryland.

== Ambassador ==
The incumbent Ambassador of Japan to the United States is Shigeo Yamada.

Past Ambassadors include Kenichirō Sasae, who presented his credentials in November 2012, and Ichirō Fujisaki, who served as ambassador from 2008 to October 2012.

The ambassador lives at 4000 Nebraska Avenue NW. The home, which sits on eight acres in the American University Park neighborhood of northwest Washington, D.C., was designed by Japanese architect Isoya Yoshida and completed in 1977 at a cost of $12 million ($50.85 million in 2022).

== About the building ==
The embassy was designed by the U.S. firm of Delano & Aldrich (one of whose principals was William Adams Delano, a distant relative of President Franklin D. Roosevelt). Emperor Hirohito allegedly approved the design personally. The United States Commission of Fine Arts approved the design of the building on September 16, 1930. Erected in 1931, the building is in the Georgian Revival architectural style, with subtle elements of Japanese architecture.

As originally designed, the embassy consisted of the ambassador's residence, two chancery buildings with strong Japanese architectural influence, a tea house, and tennis, gym, and other recreational facilities. The embassy features a cobblestone courtyard and driveway in front of the building. The original embassy building is now known as the Old Ambassador's Residence, and is located at 2516 Massachusetts Avenue NW. The original embassy and the two chancery buildings are two-and-a-half stories in height, with two underground levels. The total building height is about 31 feet (9.4 m). The chancery buildings, which front onto Massachusetts Avenue NW, are about 98 feet (30 m) wide. The grounds were landscaped to complement Rock Creek Park, which abuts the rear of the embassy grounds. As of 1971, the Japanese Embassy was one of the few remaining formal estates in the city. The total cost of construction was $500,000.

Following the attack on Pearl Harbor in December 1941, the embassy was seized by the United States government and re-purposed to house the Far Eastern Commission. The embassy was returned to Japanese control in April 1952.

In 1959, then-Ambassador Koichiro Asagai and Tatsunosuke Takasaki, a member of the House of Representatives of the National Diet, proposed creating a replica of the rock garden at Ryōan-ji at the Japanese embassy. Constructed to commemorate the 100th anniversary of the first Japanese embassy to the United States, the scaled-down garden was finished in 1960. A small teahouse named Ippakutei (the "Teahouse of 100 Years"), built in the style found at the Katsura Imperial Villa, is in back of the rock garden.

The Japanese Embassy was added to the National Register of Historic Places on February 20, 1973.

=== Chancery ===
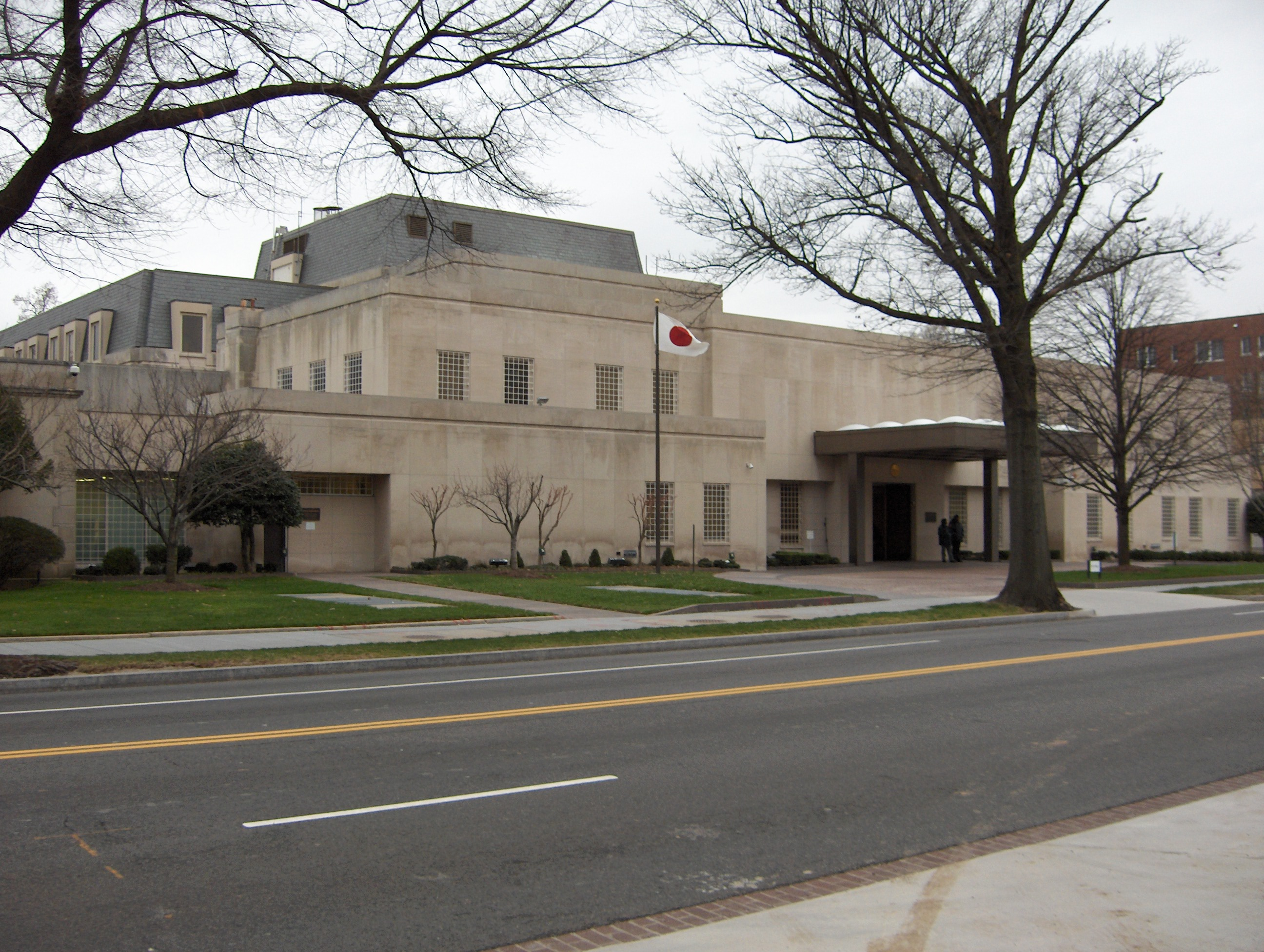
The 1986 chancery building.

A stark, Modernist chancery building (the offices of an embassy) was completed in 1986. The chancery was built after Congress passed the Foreign Missions Act in 1982, which made it easier for embassies in the District of Columbia to expand their chanceries. Oddly, the new law significantly delayed construction of the chancery. The federal government lagged in promulgating regulations for the approval of chanceries, which meant that the chancery had to be approved by the District of Columbia Zoning Commission instead. But by the time the matter arose before the Zoning Commission in February 1983, the city was already in a multi-year process to revise its zoning regulations. The delay imperiled the funding provided by the Japanese government for the new building. Under intense pressure from the United States Department of State as well as the Japanese and Saudi Arabian governments (both of which wanted to build new chanceries immediately), the city enacted emergency zoning regulations on April 12, 1983. Construction of the chancery was approved on June 10. It was designed by architect Robert B. Anderson of the Benham Group. The local Advisory Neighborhood Commission and the Sheridan-Kalorama Neighborhood Council applauded the design for "retaining the historical aspects" of the embassy compound. The project consolidated chancery offices from two rented buildings elsewhere in the District into a single structure on the embassy grounds.

The chancery has 250 underground parking spaces, and a tunnel from Waterside Drive lead to the underground parking garage (providing a more secure entry for important diplomats or visitors).

== Events ==
President Jimmy Carter visited the embassy on June 16, 1980, and on March 17, 2011, President Barack Obama visited the embassy to express condolences over the 2011 Tōhoku earthquake and tsunami. President Joe Biden visited the embassy in July 2022, after the Assassination of the former Prime Minister of Japan, Shinzo Abe to pay respect and tribute.

== Programs ==
The Washington Japanese Language School (ワシントン日本語学校 Washington Nihongo Gakkō), a supplementary school for Japanese children subsidized by the Japanese government, was first established in 1958, with classes held in the basement. As of 2022, the school offices are in Maryland and classes are held at Stone Ridge School of the Sacred Heart in Bethesda, Maryland.

== See also ==
- Japanese Embassy to the United States (1860)
- Japan–United States relations
- Embassy of the United States, Tokyo
- U.S.-Japan Council

== Bibliography ==
- Federal Writers' Project. Washington City and Capital. Washington, D.C.: Government Printing Office, 1937.
- Field, Cynthia R.; Gournay, Isabelle; and Somma, Thomas P. Paris on the Potomac: The French Influence on the Architecture and Art of Washington, D.C. Athens, Ga.: United States Capitol Historical Society, 2007.
- Salmi, Noelle. Frommer's San Francisco Day by Day. Hoboken, N.J.: John Wiley & Sons, 2008.
- Yamada, Shoji. Shots in the Dark: Japan, Zen, and the West. Chicago: University of Chicago Press, 2009.
- Washington, D.C. Greenville, SC: Michelin Travel Publications, 2001.
