= List of ambassadors of Japan to Malaysia =

The ambassador of Japan to Malaysia is the head of the Japanese diplomatic mission in Malaysia. The Japanese embassy is based in Kuala Lumpur, the Malaysian capital. The position has the rank of Ambassador extraordinary and plenipotentiary.

== List of ambassadors ==
- Takakazu Kuriyama, mid-1980s
- Masahiko Horie, 2007 – 2011
- Makio Miyagawa, 2014 – October 2019
- Oka Hiroshi, November 2019 – December 2021
- Takahashi Katsuhiko, December 2021 – October 2024
- Noriyuki Shikata, November 2024-present

== See also ==
- Japan–Malaysia relations
- List of ambassadors of Malaysia to Japan
