= Yamaza Enjirō =

Japanese diplomat

Yamaza Enjirō 山座円次郎
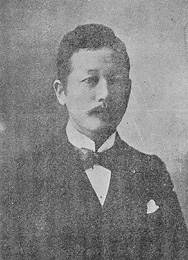
- Portrait of Yamaza Enjirō
- Born: December 2, 1866; Fukuoka, Japan
- Died: May 28, 1914 (aged 47); Beijing, China
- Occupation: diplomat

Yamaza Enjirō (山座円次郎) (December 2, 1866 – May 28, 1914) was a Japanese diplomat in Meiji period Japan.

== Early life ==
Yamaza was born in Fukuoka, as the son of a samurai of the lowest rank (ashigaru), affiliated with the Fukuoka Domain.

In 1892, he attended the Law College of the Tokyo Imperial University, where his follow classmates included Natsume Sōseki, Masaoka Shiki, Akiyama Saneyuki and Minakata Kumagusu.

== Career ==
Yamaza's work in Japan's Foreign Ministry led to appointments as part of the resident staff in at the Japanese consulates in Pusan and Incheon in Korea. Following an appointment to the Japanese embassy in London, he was appointed chargé d'affairs in Seoul in February 1901.

Back in Tokyo, Yamaza was promoted as the Director of the Political Affairs Bureau within the Foreign Ministry in 1901. Working with Foreign Minister Komura Jutarō, Enjiro was involved in forging the Anglo-Japanese Alliance. He was also involved in negotiations with the Empire of Russia and diplomacy preceding the Russo-Japanese War. Some scholarly researchers credit Yamaza with drafting the text of the Japanese Declaration of War.

Yamaza was part of the Japanese delegation which negotiated the Treaty of Portsmouth. In this context, some Korean scholars assert that Yamaza played a notable role in calling for incorporation of Liancourt Rocks within Japanese territorial claims.

In 1908, Yamaza was councillor of the Japanese embassy in Great Britain, with responsibility for planning of Japan's participation in the London Naval Conference (1908–1909) and the Japan–British Exhibition in 1910.

In 1913, Yamaza was appointed Japan's minister to China, which was then in the midst of the Xinhai Revolution. Yamaza was a supporter of Sun Yat-sen, which earned him the enmity of the powerful Yuan Shikai. Yamaza died of unknown causes in Beijing in 1914. His grave is at the Aoyama Cemetery in Tokyo.

== See also ==
- List of Ambassadors from Japan to South Korea
