= Hiromori Kawashima =

Japanese police officer and executive

- 川島 廣守

Deputy Chief Cabinet Secretary (Administrative affairs)
- In office 25 November 1973 – 25 May 1976
- Prime Minister: Kakuei Tanaka; Takeo Miki
- Preceded by: Masaharu Gotōda
- Succeeded by: Yoshimasa Umemoto

Personal details
- Born: 27 February 1922 Aizuwakamatsu, Fukushima, Japan
- Died: 9 December 2012 (aged 90) Tokyo, Japan
- Education: Chuo University

Hiromori Kawashima (27 February 1922 – 9 December 2012) was a Japanese police officer and executive who served as the Commissioner of Baseball in Nippon Professional Baseball from 1998 to 2004. He is a member of the Japanese Baseball Hall of Fame.

Kawashima was an alumnus of Chuo University. He was a senior police officer after the war and served as chief of the Security Bureau of the National Police Agency from 1968 to 1970, director of the Cabinet Research Office in 1971 and Deputy Chief Cabinet Secretary from 1973 to 1976.

In 1979 Kawashima was president of the Japan Railway Construction Public Corporation (JRCC). He was one of six JRCC executives forced to step down in September 1979 when it was revealed that the corporation had used money intended for overtime and other expenses for personal vacations.

In December 1998 Kawashima and Major League Baseball commissioner Bud Selig and signed the revised United States – Japanese Player Contract Agreement, which initiated the "posting system." It required MLB teams to place "bids" for NPB players, which became the basis of transfer fees that are paid as compensation to NPB teams whose star players sign with MLB.

Kawashima died on 9 December 2012, at the age of 90.

Government offices
Preceded by Hideo Otsu	Director of the Cabinet Research Office; 1971	Succeeded by Tomohiko Tomita; Fujio Hara (acting)
Preceded by Masaharu Gotōda	Deputy Chief Cabinet Secretary (for administrative affairs); 1973–1976	Succeeded by Yoshimasa Umemoto
Sporting positions
Preceded by Ryūji Suzuki	President of the Central League; 1984-1998	Succeeded by Sumiko Takahara
Preceded by Ichiro Yoshikuni	Commissioner of Baseball (NPB); 1998-2004	Succeeded by Yasuchika Negoro
