= Uchimura Yushi =

Japanese psychiatrist (1897–1980)

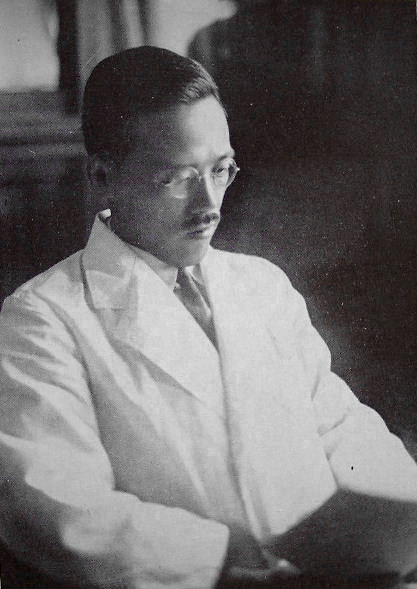
- Uchimura in 1934
- Born: November 12, 1897; Tokyo, Japan
- Died: September 17, 1980 (aged 82)

Member of the Japanese

Baseball Hall of Fame
- Induction: 1983

Uchimura Yushi (12 November 1897 – 17 September 1980) was a Japanese medical scientist and psychiatrist. He specialised in clinical psychiatry and neuropathology. He is viewed as "one of the founders of Japanese psychiatry".

== Early life and family ==
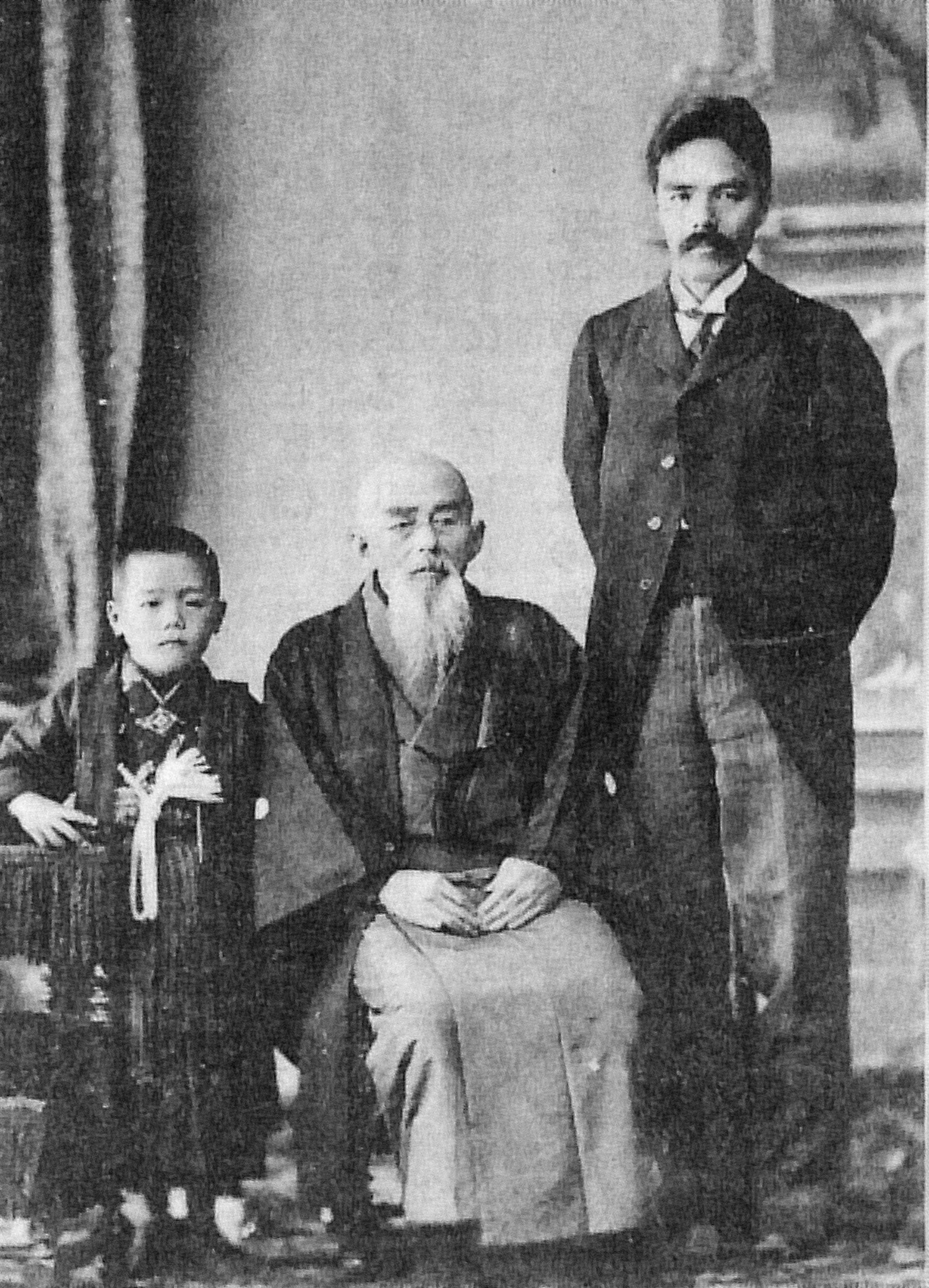
Yushi at age 7, with his father Kanzo and grandfather Yoshiyuki, 1905

He was born in Tokyo Prefecture to Uchimura Kanzo, a Christian theologian, and Uchimura Shizuko, Uchimura's fourth wife.

He was the grandson of samurai and Confucian scholar Uchimura Yoshiyuki.

== Education and career ==
Uchimura attended Tokyo Imperial University from 1918 to 1923, studying medicine and playing for the university's baseball team. After graduating Uchimura studied psychiatry in Germany, followed by research at the Kaiser Wilhelm Institute from 1925 to 1927 under Walther Spielmeyer. His research focused on Ammon's horn sclerosis, and led to an important paper published in 1928 authored by Uchimura detailing the vasculature of the hippocampus.

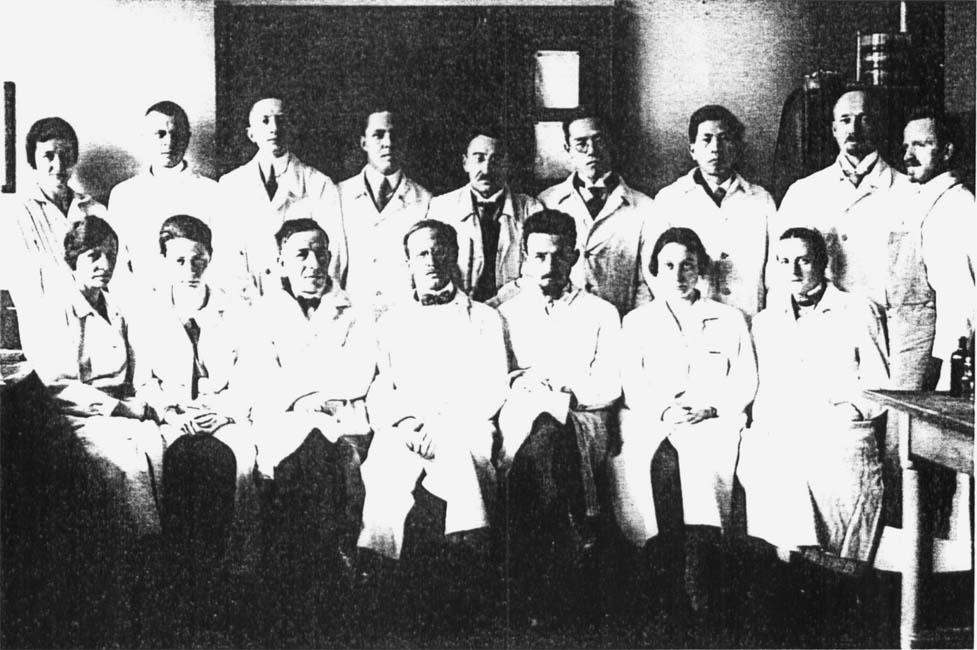
Walther Spielmeyer and his team in 1927, with Uchimura Yushi sixth from the left

In 1928, he became a professor at Hokkaido Imperial University and established the Department of Psychiatry and Neurology. Inspired by the racial hygiene policies of Germany, Uchimura conducted field research among the indigenous Ainu people of Hokkaido, providing the basis for Japan's eugenics laws. After the atomic bombings of Hiroshima and Nagasaki, Uchimura was one of the psychiatrists leading work into how radiation exposure affected the neuropathology of the brain.

He was a founder of the journal Psychiatry and Clinical Neurosciences in 1933, and acted as one of its chief editors.

In 1936, he became a professor in the faculty of medicine at the University of Tokyo, serving as dean of the faculty and the graduate school of medicine from 1953 to 1957. After retiring he held the position of professor emeritus and was elected as a member of the Japan Academy in 1965.

== Baseball ==
In May 1962, Uchimura became the third commissioner of Nippon Professional Baseball. Uchimura was inducted into the Japanese Baseball Hall of Fame in 1983.
