= List of ambassadors of Japan to the United States =

The ambassador of Japan to the United States has existed since 1860, interrupted by disagreements and wars during World War II.

Shigeo Yamada is the current Japanese ambassador to the United States, having been appointed on October 24, 2023.

== Special Charge d'Affaires ==
- Arinori Mori, 1870–1872
- Saburō Takagi, 1872–1873
- Jirō Yano, 1873–1874

== Envoy Extraordinary and Minister Plenipotentiary ==
- Kiyonari Yoshida, 1874–1882
- Munenori Terashima, 1882–1884
- Ryūichi Kuki, 1884–1888
- Viscount Munemitsu Mutsu, 1888–1890
- Gōzō Tateno, 1891–1894
- Shin'ichirō Kurino, 1894–1896
- Tōru Hoshi, 1896–1898
- Jutarō Komura, 1898–1900
- Baron Kogorō Takahira, 1900–1906 (1st time)

== Ambassador ==
- Viscount Shūzō Aoki, 1906–1908
- Baron Kogorō Takahira, 1908–1909 (2nd time)
- Viscount Kōsai Uchida, 1909–1911
- Viscount Sutemi Chinda, 1912–1916
- Aimaro Satō, 1916–1918
- Viscount Kikujirō Ishii, 1918–1919
- Baron Kijūrō Shidehara, 1919–1922
- Masanao Hanihara, 1922–1924
- Tsuneo Matsudaira, 1924–1928
- Katsuji Debuchi, 1928–1934
- Hiroshi Saitō, 1934–1939
- Kensuke Horinouchi, 1939–1940
- Kichisaburō Nomura, 1940–1941 (Ambassador during the attack on Pearl Harbor)
- Saburō Kurusu, 1941 (Special envoy to negotiate peace with U.S. officials)
- No representation during Allied occupation of Japan (1945–1952)
- Eikichi Araki, 1952–1953
- Sadao Iguchi, 1954–1956
- Masayuki Tani, 1956–1957
- Kōichirō Asakai, 1957–1963
- Ryūji Takeuchi, 1963–1967
- Takeso Shimoda, 1967–1970
- Nobuhiko Ushiba, 1970–1973
- Takeshi Yasukawa, 1973–1975
- Fumihiko Tōgō, 1975–1980
- Yoshio Ōkawara, 1980–1985
- Nobuo Matsunaga, 1985–1989
- Ryōhei Murata, 1989–1992
- Takakazu Kuriyama, 1992–1995
- Kunihiko Saitō, 1995–1999
- Shunji Yanai, 1999–2001
- Ryōzō Katō, 2001–2008
- Ichirō Fujisaki, 2008–2012
- Ken'ichirō Sasae, 2012–2018
- Shinsuke J. Sugiyama, 2018–2021
- Koji Tomita, 2021–2023
- Shigeo Yamada, 2023–present

== See also ==
- Japanese Embassy to the United States (up until 1860)
- Embassy of Japan in Washington, D.C.
- United States Ambassador to Japan
- Japan–United States relations
  - Convention of Kanagawa
  - Treaty of Amity and Commerce (United States–Japan)
  - Security Treaty Between the United States and Japan
  - Treaty of San Francisco
  - Treaty of Mutual Cooperation and Security between the United States and Japan
  - United States Forces Japan
  - U.S.–Japan Status of Forces Agreement
- Foreign relations of Japan
- Foreign relations of the United States
- Ambassadors of the United States
- Embassy of the United States in Tokyo
- Saburo Kido
