= Toshiyuki Takano =

Japanese diplomat

Toshiyuki Takano (高野 紀元, Takano Toshiyuki; born in 1944) is a Japanese Ambassador to Germany, previously to South Korea (2002–2005) and Singapore (2001). In February 2005 he sparked a controversy in South Korea when he stated that the Liancourt Rocks in the Sea of Japan, currently under South Korean administration, "historically and legally" belong to Japan.

== See also ==
- List of Ambassadors from Japan to South Korea
