= Hanabusa Yoshitada =

Japanese diplomat

Senior Second Rank Viscount Hanabusa Yoshitada
- 花房 義質
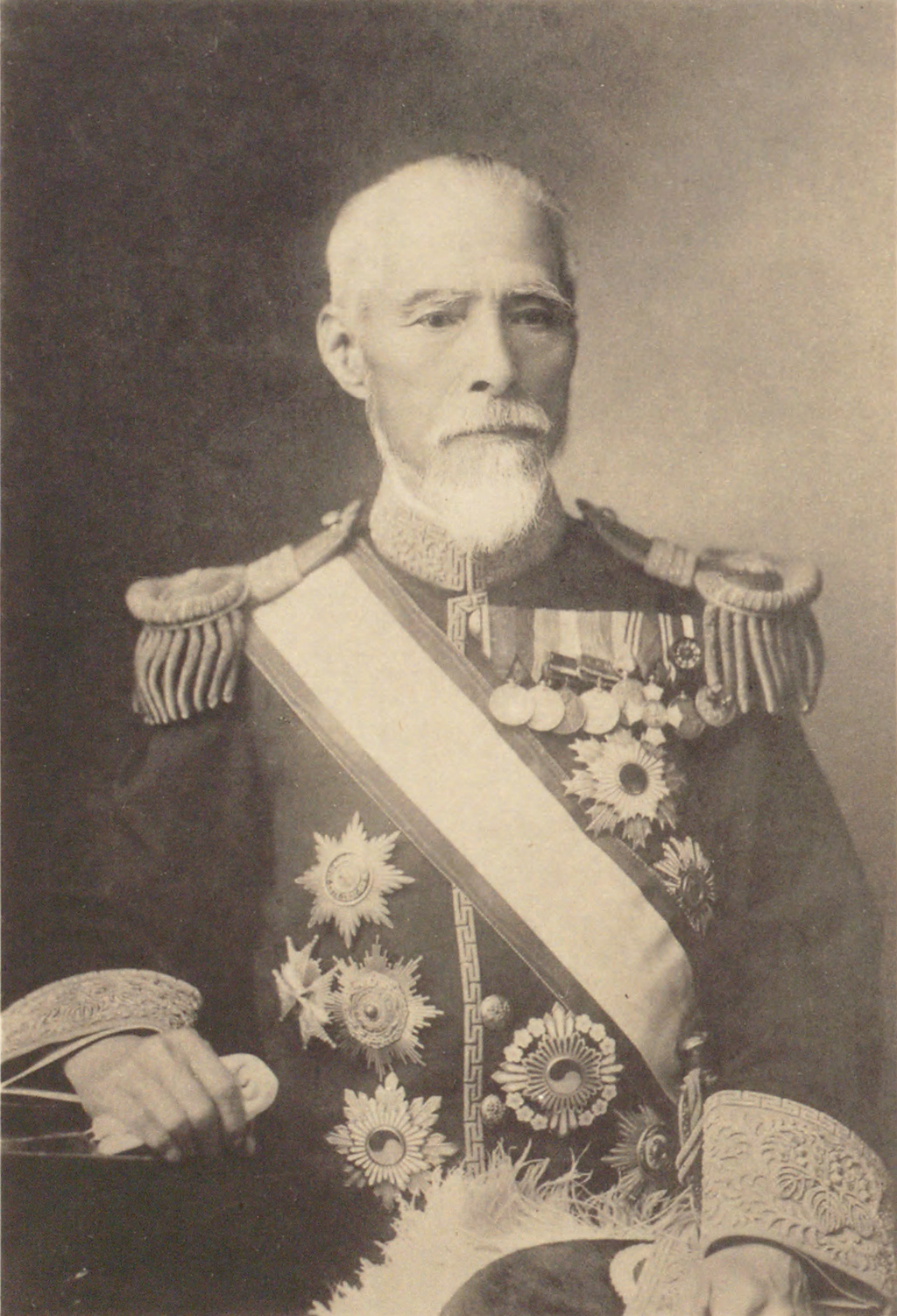
- Born: February 10, 1842; Okayama, Japan
- Died: July 9, 1917 (aged 75); Tokyo, Japan
- Other names: Hanabusa Yoshimoto
- Occupation: Diplomat

Viscount Hanabusa Yoshitada (花房 義質; February 10, 1842 – July 9, 1917), also known as Hanabusa Yoshimoto, was a Japanese politician, diplomat and peer.

== Biography ==
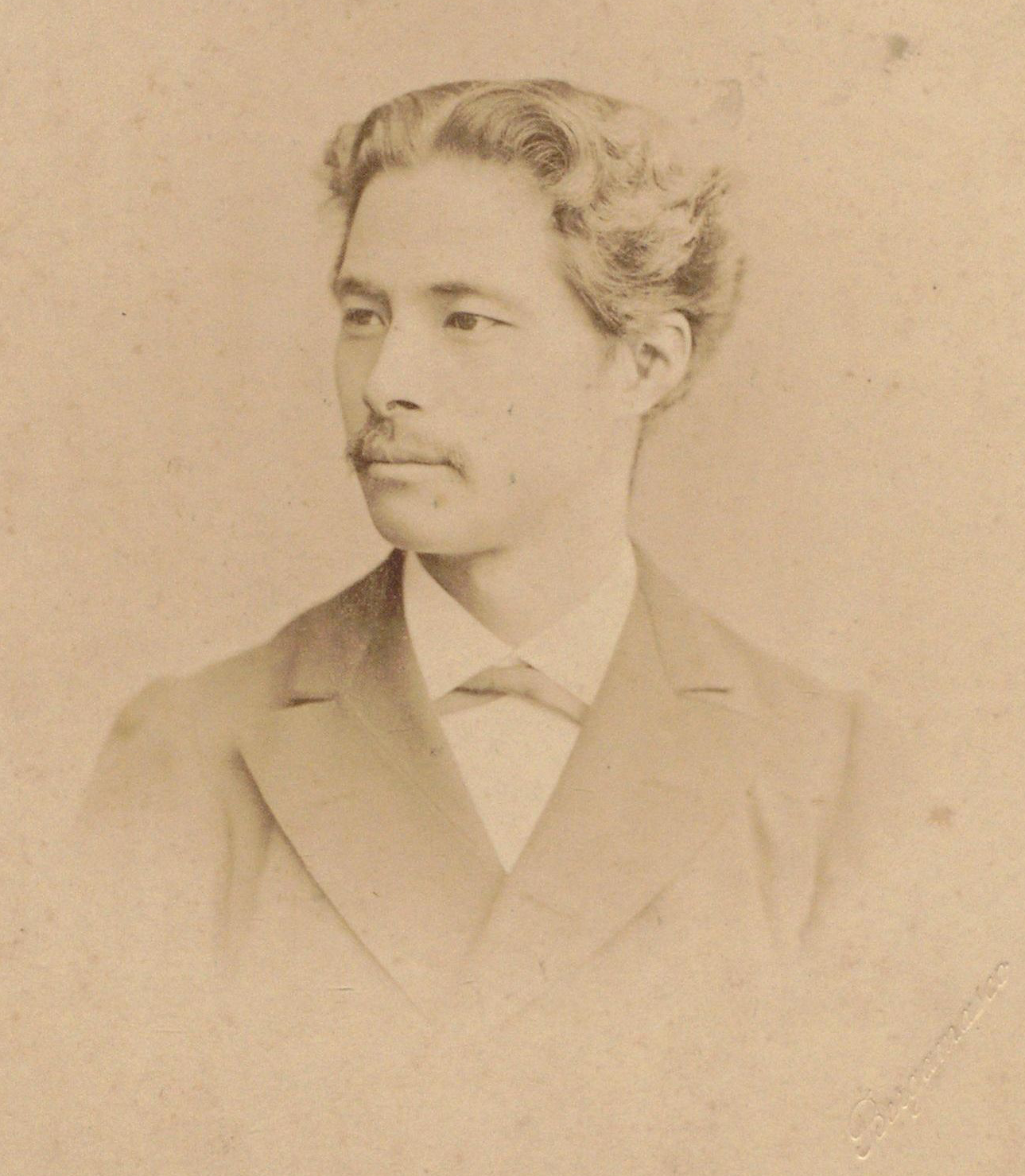
Hanabusa Yoshitada as a young man.

Hanabusa was the eldest son of Hanabusa Tanren, a samurai retainer of Okayama Domain and the first mayor of the city of Okayama, Japan. He studied rangaku under the famed Ogata Kōan, and immediately after the Meiji Restoration in 1867 was sent to Europe and North America as a student. On his return in 1870, he was accepted into the Foreign Ministry. The same year, he was sent to Beijing as part of the Japanese delegation negotiating the opening of diplomatic relations between the Empire of Japan and Qing dynasty Empire of China.

In 1872, he served as secretary to Soejima Taneomi during the negotiations involving the Maria Luz Incident. Soon afterwards, he was dispatched to Saint Petersburg to assist Enomoto Takeaki in negotiating the Treaty of Saint Petersburg (1875), which formalized the border between Japan and the Empire of Russia.

In 1877, Hanabusa was sent to Busan to oversee the opening of that port as per the terms of the Japan–Korea Treaty of 1876 signed the previous year with Joseon dynasty Korea. In 1879, Hanabusa was the first Japanese diplomat to take up residence and to establish a permanent legation in Seoul.

Hanabusa was subsequently known for his involvement in the "Imo incident," which was a military revolt of some units of the Korean military in Seoul on July 23, 1882. While the exact causes and details of the incident remain a topic of controversy, violence did erupt, and Hanabusa and his aides were forced to flee the legation, and were rescued by a British ship, the Flying Fish then in port at Chemulpo.

The Japanese government immediately sent Hanabusa back to Seoul, with his security ensured by four warships, three cargo ships and a battalion of armed soldiers. Hanabusa was the chief Japanese negotiator for the Treaty of Chemulpo, which permitted the permanent garrison of Japanese troops in Seoul.

In November 1882, Hanabusa was transferred from Korea to St. Petersburg as Japanese ambassador to Russia.

In July 1887, Hanabusa returned to Tokyo, where he was made a councilor to the Imperial Household Ministry. In June 1896, he was accorded the title of baron (danshaku) under the kazoku peerage system. In September 1907, his rank was elevated to Viscount (shishaku).

In December 1911, Hanabusa was made a privy councillor. In December 1912, he became Chairman of the Japanese Red Cross.

Viscount Hanabusa died on July 9, 1917.

== Honors ==
- 1896, Baron.
- 1907, Viscount.

== See also ==
- List of Ambassadors from Japan to South Korea
