= Ichirō Fujisaki =

Japanese diplomat

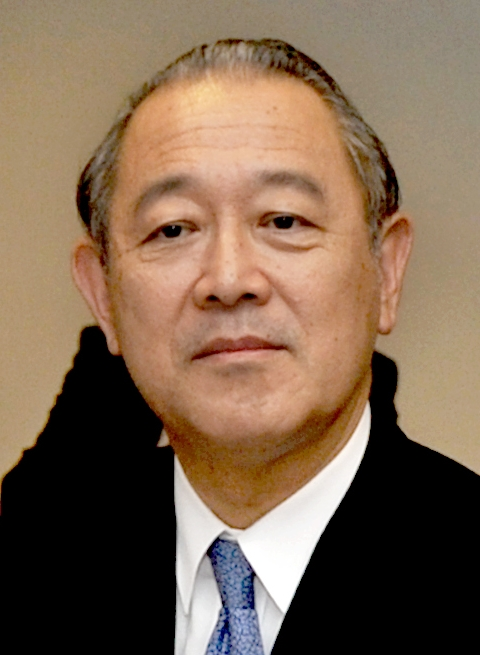

Japanese Ambassador to the United States
- In office 2008–2012
- Preceded by: Ryozo Kato
- Succeeded by: Kenichiro Sasae

Personal details
- Born: July 10, 1947 (age 78) Kagoshima Prefecture, Japan
- Spouse: Yoriko
- Children: Two
- Profession: Diplomat

Ichiro Fujisaki (藤崎 一郎, Fujisaki Ichirō; born July 10, 1947) is a Japanese diplomat who was the Japanese Ambassador to the United States from 2008 to 2012. He was previously the Japanese Ambassador to the United Nations and to the World Trade Organization.

== Biography ==
Fujisaki was born in Kagoshima Prefecture. He attended junior high school in Seattle, Washington as an exchange student in the 1960s. He graduated from Keio Jr. High and Keio High School. He received a degree in economics from Keio University. He then attended Stanford University Graduate School, department of political science.

Fujisaki entered the Japanese Ministry of Foreign Affairs in 1969. Over the course of his diplomatic career, Fujisaki served as director-general of the North American Affairs Bureau in the Ministry of Foreign Affairs and as Deputy Minister for Foreign Affairs and overseas in Jakarta, London, and Paris. In his capacity as Deputy Foreign Minister, he served as personal representative of Japanese Prime Minister Junichiro Koizumi to the G8 summit from 2002 to 2005.

He is now a guest professor at Keio University.

== Ancestry ==
Ancestors of Ichirō Fujisaki

2. Masato Fujisaki
1. Ichirō Fujisaki
6. Keinosuke Fujii
3. Fusako Fujii
14. Nishi Genshirō
7. Seiko Nishi
30. Itō Hirobumi
15. Asako Itō

== Notes ==
Diplomatic posts
Preceded by Ryozo Kato	Japanese Ambassador to the United States; 2008–2012	Succeeded by Kenichiro Sasae
Non-profit organization positions
Preceded by Yoshio Okawara	President of the America–Japan Society; 2013–present	Incumbent
Preceded by Ken Sato	President of the Nakasone Peace Institute; 2018–2023	Succeeded by Hirofumi Nakasone
