= Katsuhiko Kumazaki =

Japanese baseball commissioner (1942–2022)

Katsuhiko Kumazaki (熊﨑 勝彦, Kumazaki Katsuhiko, January 24, 1942 – May 13, 2022) was the commissioner for the Nippon Professional Baseball league. He served as the Commissioner of Baseball (NPB) between 2014 and 2017. He handed out punishments for many reasons, including gambling. He was key in the return of baseball to the 2020 Olympics.
