= Koji Tomita =

Japanese diplomat (born 1957)

His Excellency Koji Tomita
- 冨田 浩司
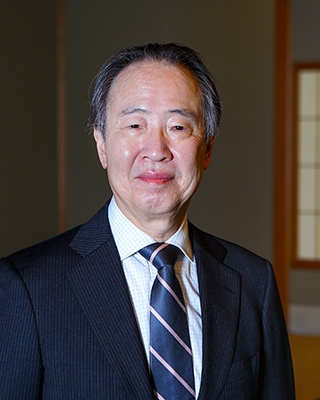

Japanese Ambassador to the United States
- In office December 25, 2020 – October 24, 2023
- Prime Minister: Yoshihide Suga; Fumio Kishida
- Preceded by: Shinsuke Sugiyama
- Succeeded by: Shigeo Yamada

Personal details
- Born: November 8, 1957 (age 68) Fukuoka, Japan

Koji Tomita (冨田 浩司, Tomita Kōji; born 8 November 1957) is a Japanese diplomat who served as Japanese ambassador to the United States from 2020 to 2023. He previously served as ambassador to South Korea and Israel.

== Career ==
Koji Tomita was born on 8 November 1957, in Fukuoka, but grew up in Hyogo prefecture. He studied law at University of Tokyo and also studied as an exchange student for a year at Davidson College in the United States. Tomita joined the Ministry of Foreign Affairs after graduating in 1981. After joining the Ministry he was sent to Oxford University for two years to receive training in the English language and international politics.

Tomita's diplomatic career includes postings at the OECD Delegation in Paris and at the Japanese embassies in South Korea and the United Kingdom. In June 2012 he became minister and deputy chief of mission at the Embassy of Japan to the United States. After returning to Japan in June 2013 he was chief of the North American Bureau in the Ministry. In November 2015 he was appointed Ambassador to Israel and served until June 2018, after which he acted as Japan's sherpa for the 2018 G20 summit. In October the following year he was appointed Ambassador to South Korea.

Tomita was appointed Ambassador to the United States in December 2020. In an interview, he stated his familiarity with Obama-era officials led to his appointment as ambassador after the election of Joe Biden.

Tomita was replaced as ambassador in October 2023 and retired from public service. He was employed as adviser to the Mori Hamada & Matsumoto law firm in May 2024.

== Personal life ==
His wife, Noriko, is the daughter of the author Yukio Mishima. They have a son and two daughters.

Tomita has published two books in Japanese on British prime ministers Winston Churchill and Margaret Thatcher, the latter of which received the Shichihei Yamamoto Award in 2019.

Diplomatic posts
Preceded by Shinsuke Sugiyama	Japanese Ambassador to the United States; 2020–2023	Succeeded by Shigeo Yamada
Preceded by Yasumasa Nagamine	Japanese Ambassador to South Korea; 2019–2020	Succeeded by Kōichi Aiboshi
Preceded by Shigeo Matsutomi	Japanese Ambassador to Israel; 2015–2018	Succeeded by Kōichi Aiboshi
