= Lists of ambassadors of Japan =

Lists of ambassadors of Japan may refer to:

- List of ambassadors of Japan to Algeria
- List of ambassadors of Japan to Angola
- List of ambassadors of Japan to Argentina
- List of ambassadors of Japan to Australia
- List of ambassadors of Japan to Belgium
- List of ambassadors of Japan to Brazil
- List of ambassadors of Japan to Chile
- List of ambassadors of Japan to China
- List of ambassadors of Japan to Cuba
- List of ambassadors of Japan to Czechoslovakia and the Czech Republic
- List of ambassadors of Japan to Finland
- List of ambassadors of Japan to France
- List of Japanese ministers, envoys and ambassadors to Germany
- List of ambassadors of Japan to Greece
- List of ambassadors of Japan to the Holy See
- List of ambassadors of Japan to Italy
- List of ambassadors of Japan to Lithuania
- List of ambassadors of Japan to Malaysia
- List of ambassadors of Japan to Mexico
- List of ambassadors of Japan to Panama
- List of ambassadors of Japan to Peru
- List of ambassadors of Japan to the Philippines
- List of ambassadors of Japan to Poland
- List of ambassadors of Japan to Portugal
- List of ambassadors of Japan to South Korea
- List of ambassadors of Japan to Spain
- List of ambassadors of Japan to Thailand
- List of ambassadors of Japan to the United States
