= List of ambassadors of Japan to Chile =

Ambassador of Japan to Chile
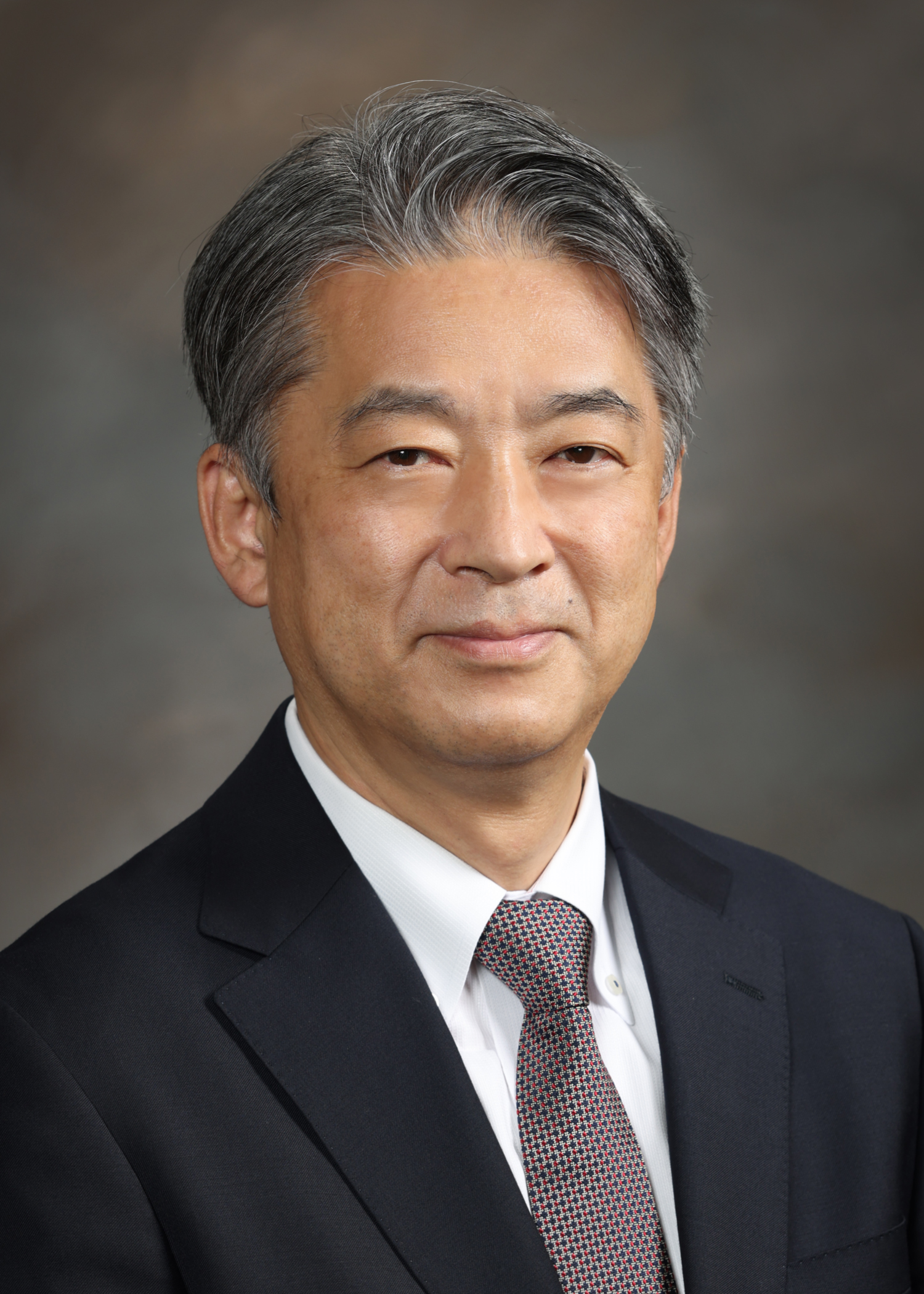
- Incumbent; Kenko Sone 曽根健孝 since December 30, 2025
- Appointer: Emperor Naruhito
- Inaugural holder: Hioki Eki (日置 益)
- Website: Embassy of Japan in Chile

The Ambassador of Japan to Chile is an officer of the Japanese Ministry of Foreign Affairs and the head of the Embassy of Japan to Chile.

The first Japanese ambassador was Hioki Eki, who presented his credentials to Chilean president Pedro Montt in 1909. Carlos Morla Vicuña was his counterpart as the first Chilean ambassador sent to Tokyo.

Japan and Chile's diplomatic relationship goes back to 1897 when Hoshi Tōru, a foreign minister to the United States, and Domingo Gana for Chile, negotiated the Treaty of Amity, Commerce and Navigation between the two countries in Washington D.C. It would be Chile's first treaty with an Asian country. The treaty would be ratified in Japan under the Saionji Kinmochi administration with Hioki dispatched under Foreign Minister Komura Jutarō. The two countries continue to maintain important academic and economic relations between the two countries today.

The Japanese Ministry of Foreign Affairs maintains its chancery (jp) in the Santiago commune of Providencia, and a residence in Vitacura.

== List of representatives ==
See also: List of Chilean ambassadors to Japan on the Spanish language wiki at (Embajadores de Chile en Japón) or the Japanese language wiki at (日本とチリの関係)

This is a chronological list of Japanese diplomats.

No.	Name	Portrait	Rank	Accredited	Emperor	President	Notes
1	Hioki Eki (日置 益)		Minister Plenipotentiary (特命全権公使)	July 1, 1909	Meiji	Pedro Montt	
2	Fujii Minoru (藤井 實)		Resident minister (外交官補)	October 4, 1911	Meiji	Ramón Barros Luco	
*	Hioki Eki (日置 益)		Minister Plenipotentiary (特命全権公使)	October 13, 1912	Taishō	Ramón Barros Luco	
3	Kondō Sunaokichi (近藤 愿吉)		Resident minister (外交官補)	June 11, 1914	Taishō	Ramón Barros Luco	
*	Iijima Kametarō (飯島 亀太郎)		Chargé d'affaires ad interim (臨時代理大使)	August 14, 1914	Taishō	Ramón Barros Luco	
4	Tatsuke Shichita (田付 七太)		Minister Plenipotentiary (特命全権公使)	February 2, 1918	Taishō	Juan Luis Sanfuentes	
*	Amari Zoji (甘利 造次)		Chargé d'affaires ad interim (臨時代理大使)	December 25, 1920	Taishō	Arturo Alessandri	
*	Kurusu Saburō (来栖三郎)		Chargé d'affaires ad interim (臨時代理大使)	March 2, 1923	Taishō	Arturo Alessandri	
5	Sakenobe Nobumichi (鮭延 信道)		Minister Plenipotentiary (特命全権公使)	October 2, 1924	Taishō	Luis Altamirano	
*	Kitazawa Taizō (北沢 泰三)		Chargé d'affaires ad interim (臨時代理大使)	September 11, 1927	Hirohito	Carlos Ibáñez del Campo	
6	Mori Yasusaburō (森 安三郎)		Minister Plenipotentiary (特命全権公使)	May 31, 1930	Hirohito	Carlos Ibáñez del Campo	
*	Tamagi Katsujirō (玉木 勝次郎)		Chargé d'affaires ad interim (臨時代理大使)	May 10, 1933	Hirohito	Arturo Alessandri	
7	Yano Makoto (外交 官)		Minister Plenipotentiary (特命全権公使)	February 16, 1934	Hirohito	Arturo Alessandri	
*	Hayao Suetaka (早尾 季鷹)		Chargé d'affaires ad interim (臨時代理大使)	April 21, 1936	Hirohito	Arturo Alessandri	
8	Miyake Tetsuichirō (三宅 哲一郎)		Minister Plenipotentiary (特命全権公使)	July 25, 1936	Hirohito	Arturo Alessandri	
9	Shiozaki Kanzō (塩崎 観三)		Minister Plenipotentiary (特命全権公使)	January 4, 1940	Hirohito	Pedro Aguirre Cerda	
*	Kawasaki Eiji (川崎 栄治)		Chargé d'affaires ad interim (臨時代理大使)	September 20, 1940	Hirohito	Pedro Aguirre Cerda	
10	Yamagata Kiyoshi (山形 清)		Minister Plenipotentiary (特命全権公使)	October 22, 1941	Hirohito	Juan Antonio Ríos	
*	Diplomatic relations suspended on 16 September, 1943, due to World War 2						
11	Narita Katsushirō (成田 勝四郎)		Minister Plenipotentiary (特命全権公使)	January 3, 1953	Hirohito	Carlos Ibáñez del Campo	
*	Satō Ryōzu (佐藤 量寿)		Chargé d'affaires ad interim (臨時代理大使)	December 11, 1956	Hirohito	Carlos Ibáñez del Campo	
12	Yaguchi Rokurō (矢口 麓蔵)		Minister Plenipotentiary (特命全権公使)	March 6, 1957	Hirohito	Carlos Ibáñez del Campo	
*	Yaguchi Rokurō (矢口 麓蔵)		Ambassador (特命全権公使)	May 15, 1957	Hirohito	Carlos Ibáñez del Campo	
*	Andō Ryuichi (安藤 龍一)		Chargé d'affaires ad interim (臨時代理大使)	November 1, 1960	Hirohito	Jorge Alessandri	
13	Tanaka Mitsuo (田中 三男)		Ambassador (特命全権公使)	March 10, 1961	Hirohito	Jorge Alessandri	
*	Iwama Tatsuo (岩間 龍夫)		Chargé d'affaires ad interim (臨時代理大使)	October 7, 1963	Hirohito	Jorge Alessandri	
14	Kanayama Masahide (金山 英勢)		Ambassador (特命全権公使)	December 3, 1963	Hirohito	Jorge Alessandri	
*	Itō Masao (伊藤 政雄)		Chargé d'affaires ad interim (臨時代理大使)	February 5, 1967	Hirohito	Eduardo Frei Montalva	
15	Takahashi Satoru (高橋 覚)		Ambassador (特命全権公使)	May 2, 1967	Hirohito	Eduardo Frei Montalva	
*	Itō Masao (伊藤 政雄)		Chargé d'affaires ad interim (臨時代理大使)	July 31, 1969	Hirohito	Eduardo Frei Montalva	
16	Satō Sakito (佐藤 崎人)		Ambassador (特命全権公使)	August 4, 1969	Hirohito	Eduardo Frei Montalva	
*	Inayoshi Hidezō (稲吉 日出蔵)		Chargé d'affaires ad interim (臨時代理大使)	August 8, 1972	Hirohito	Salvador Allende	
17	Endō Matao (遠藤 又男)		Ambassador (特命全権公使)	September 25, 1972	Hirohito	Salvador Allende	
*	Akimoto Kenjirō (秋本 健志郎)		Chargé d'affaires ad interim (臨時代理大使)	July 29, 1975	Hirohito	Augusto Pinochet	
18	Yamashita Shigeaki (山下 重明)		Ambassador (特命全権公使)	February 1, 1976	Hirohito	Augusto Pinochet	
*	Inayoshi Hidezō (稲吉 日出蔵)		Chargé d'affaires ad interim (臨時代理大使)	October 3, 1979	Hirohito	Augusto Pinochet	
20	Akatani Genichi (赤谷 源一)		Ambassador (特命全権公使)	November 19, 1979	Hirohito	Augusto Pinochet	
*	Rokuzo Yukio (六条 幸雄)		Chargé d'affaires ad interim (臨時代理大使)	November 19, 1983	Hirohito	Augusto Pinochet	
21	Komura Kouichi (小村 康一)		Ambassador (特命全権公使)	December 1, 1983	Hirohito	Augusto Pinochet	
*	Hanawa Tetsuo (塙 哲夫)		Chargé d'affaires ad interim (臨時代理大使)	April 6, 1986	Hirohito	Augusto Pinochet	
22	Nomiyama Shuichi (野見山 修一)		Ambassador (特命全権公使)	August 1, 1986	Hirohito	Augusto Pinochet	
*	Kubo Hiromitsu (久保 光弘)		Chargé d'affaires ad interim (臨時代理大使)	November 9, 1989	Hirohito	Augusto Pinochet	
23	Shikama Rikio (色摩 力夫)		Ambassador (特命全権公使)	December 19, 1989~1992	Akihito	Augusto Pinochet	
24~25	no citations currently found - please add if available						
~26	Narita Yubun (成田右文)		Ambassador (特命全権公使)	~1999	Akihito	Eduardo Frei Ruiz-Tagle	
~27	Ogawa Hajime (小川元)		Ambassador (特命全権公使)	2002	Akihito	Ricardo Lagos	
~28	Hayashi Wataru (林渉)		Ambassador (特命全権公使)	August 2007	Akihito	Michelle Bachelet	
~29	Murakami Hidenori (村上秀徳)		Ambassador (特命全権公使)	September 1, 2011	Akihito	Sebastián Piñera	
~30	Nikai Naoto (二階 尚人)		Ambassador (特命全権公使)	August 5, 2014	Akihito	Michelle Bachelet	
~31	Hiraishi Yoshinobu (平石 好伸)		Ambassador (特命全権公使)	April 2017	Akihito	Michelle Bachelet	
~32	Shibuya Kazuhisa (渋谷 和久)		Ambassador (特命全権公使)	September 8, 2020	Naruhito	Sebastián Piñera	
~33	Ito Kyoko (伊藤 恭子)		Ambassador (特命全権公使)	December 28, 2023	Naruhito	Gabriel Boric	
~34	Sone Kenko (曽根 健孝)		Ambassador (特命全権公使)	December 30, 2025	Naruhito	Gabriel Boric	

== See also ==
- Chile–Japan relations
- Japanese Chileans
