= Greece–Japan relations =

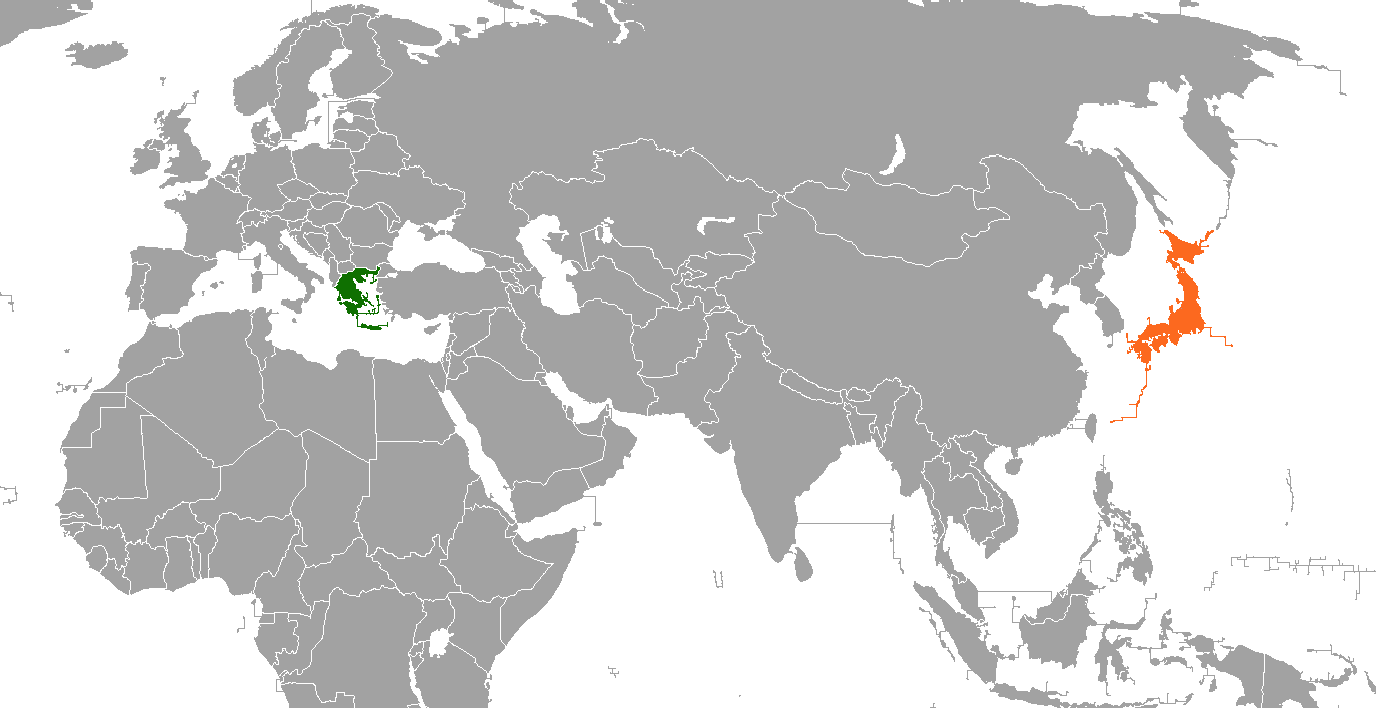
- Greece: Japan

Greece–Japan relations (Japanese: ギリシャと日本関係, romanized: Girisha to Nihon kankei), are foreign relations between Greece and Japan. Greece has an embassy in Tokyo, while Japan has an embassy in Athens.

== Diplomatic relations ==
Greece and Japan established diplomatic relations in 1899, as both countries concluded a Treaty of Friendship, Commerce and Navigation. There has been a Greek Embassy in Tokyo since 1960, and a Japanese Embassy in Athens since the same year, when it was decided to upgrade the Japanese Consulate which had opened in 1922 and reopened in 1956. The consulate closed during World War II (1939–45), when Greece joined the Allies, while Japan the Axis respectively.

Since then the two countries have cooperated closely .

== Treaty framework ==
Relations between the two countries were established with the signing of the Agreement on friendship, trade and navigation. The following bilateral agreements have also been concluded:

1956: Agreement on abolition of visas for non-diplomatic passports.

1973: Aviation Agreement.

1981: Education agreement.

2002: Action plan for the promotion of Greek-Japanese relations.

== Political relations ==
As far as political cooperation goes, the two countries are working closely together to upgrade their bilateral relations as well as in their response to international crises and in dealing with current issues of international interest. They also cooperate closely and provide reciprocal support in matters of direct national interest, and mutually support each other's candidacies for positions in international organizations. In 1919, Greece supported Japanese racial equality proposal against Great Powers.

In the elections for seats on the UN Security Council, the two countries supported each other's candidacy for positions as non-permanent members of the Council (2005–2006), while during their term on the Council their cooperation in international affairs has become even closer.

The political relations between Greece and Japan are reflected in frequent high-level visits, mainly ministerial visits in the framework of international conferences. In terms of bilateral visits, the then Prime Minister of Greece, Konstantinos Simitis, visited Japan between 3–5 March 2002, accompanied by a delegation of businessmen and journalists, while the Speaker of the Greek Parliament, Mrs. Anna Psarouda-Benaki, visited Tokyo from 29 May to 3 June 2005.

In 1-3.05.03, the Japanese Prime Minister, Junichiro Koizumi, visited Greece for the EU-Japan summit during the Greek Presidency of the EU. On that occasion he held a bilateral meeting with the then Greek Prime Minister Konstantinos Simitis. The Greek Prime Minister Karamanlis paid a working visit to Japan (10-13.11.2005).

The President of the Japanese Parliament, Yōhei Kōno, visited Greece in 9–10 January 2005.

== Economic and trading relations ==
Although there is a substantial volume of trade between the two countries, the balance is disproportionately in Japan's favour, at a ratio of about 1:10. This is because most Japanese exports to Greece are hi-tech and industrial products, while Greek exports are agricultural produce, marble, etc. However, recent years have seen a steady increase in Greek exports, which is indicative of the potential and marked competitiveness of Greek businesses on the Japanese market.

One area in which Greece is particularly dynamic is shipping, with a steadily rising volume of orders and ships being constructed in Japanese yards. It is estimated that these orders are worth 2 billion dollars each year.

Greece is one of the countries where Japanese investment remains low, but Japanese companies have expressed keen interest in cooperation with Greek businesses in the investment sector, while annual exchange visits of business delegations from each side are doing much to promote trade and investment through better understanding of the specific features of the two markets. Within this context Greece had its own pavilion at the 2005 international trade fair in Aichi, Japan.

The number of tourists visiting Greece from Japan has been rising steadily in recent years. About 80,000 Japanese tourists visit the country each year. Even larger numbers are expected in the future, following the huge publicity which Greece enjoyed during the Olympic Year 2004.

In 2000, the Greek-Japanese Chamber of Commerce was established as a non-profit organization, as the successful progress of the Association of Hellenic Japanese Business Co-operation. The Greek-Japanese Chamber is aiming towards promoting mutual economic, commercial and business relations between Greece and Japan.

== Cultural relations ==
The Irish-Greek Lafcadio Hearn became a significant figure in Japanese literature.

In 1999 celebratory cultural events were organized on both sides to mark the centenary of the establishment of diplomatic relations between Greece and Japan.

Over recent years, there has been rise in cultural exchange. Within the context of the Cultural Months envisaged in the Greece-Japan Action Plan in the run-up to the 2004 Olympics, numerous cultural events were organized in both countries, all highly successful, well-attended and extensively covered by the media. To mention a few examples:

=== In Japan ===
- Performances in Japan of the ancient Greek tragedy Antigone, by the National Theatre (2003);
- An archaeological exhibition on the subject of Alexander the Great: Cultural Contacts between East and West (2003);
- Performances of traditional Greek dances from all over Greece by a 30-member troupe from the Likiou ton Ellinidon (2004).

=== In Greece ===
- Performances of the ancient tragedy Oedipus Rex, by Y. Ninagawa, Herod Atticus Theatre (2004);
- Noh Theatre performance: Sanbasou – Dai-Hannya (noh) – The Sutra of Great Wisdom, directed by Rokuro Gensho Umewaka, Herod Atticus Theatre (2010);
- Noh theatre performance: "Nekyia", a story from Book 11 of Homer’s The Odyssey, directed by Michael Marmarinos and Rokuro Gensho Umewaka, Ancient Theatre of Epidaurus (2015), supported by Arts Council Tokyo (Tokyo Metropolitan Foundation for History and Culture);
- Greek-oriented cultural agencies: There are a number of Greek oriented cultural organizations in Japan, set up at the initiative of Japanese academics in the field of Greek studies, in order to promote Greek culture, history and the learning of the Greek language. Some of the most important of these are The Classical Society of Japan, The Aegean Society of Japan, and The Japan Greece Society.

The year 2009 marked the 110th anniversary of friendship between the countries. From March to the end of the year, both countries scheduled extensive cultural exhibits celebrating the occasion.

Modern Japanese cultural exports to Greece including anime, video games, food and music have had an impact on modern Greek society.

== Tokei Maru ==
In 1922, during the Burning of Smyrna the Japanese freighter Tokei Maru saved many Greek refugees who were trying to escape from the Turks. When the Turkish soldiers surrounded the ship and threaten to sink it, the Japanese captain responded: "If you dare to even touch a hair of any of the refugees, I shall regard it as an affront to the Japanese flag and a threat to the Japanese government."

== Greek community in Japan ==
Lafcadio Hearn was a Greek-Irish-Japanese writer, translator, and teacher who introduced the culture and literature of Japan to the West.

There is a Greek community of roughly 300 people living in Japan. The majority of them are employed by multinational companies, although some are businesspeople who have settled there on a permanent basis.

== Resident diplomatic missions ==
- Greece has an embassy in Tokyo.
- Japan has an embassy in Athens.

== See also ==
- Foreign relations of Greece
- Foreign relations of Japan
- Japan–EU relations
- List of ambassadors of Japan to Greece
