= Mineichirō Adachi =

Japanese legal expert (1869–1934)

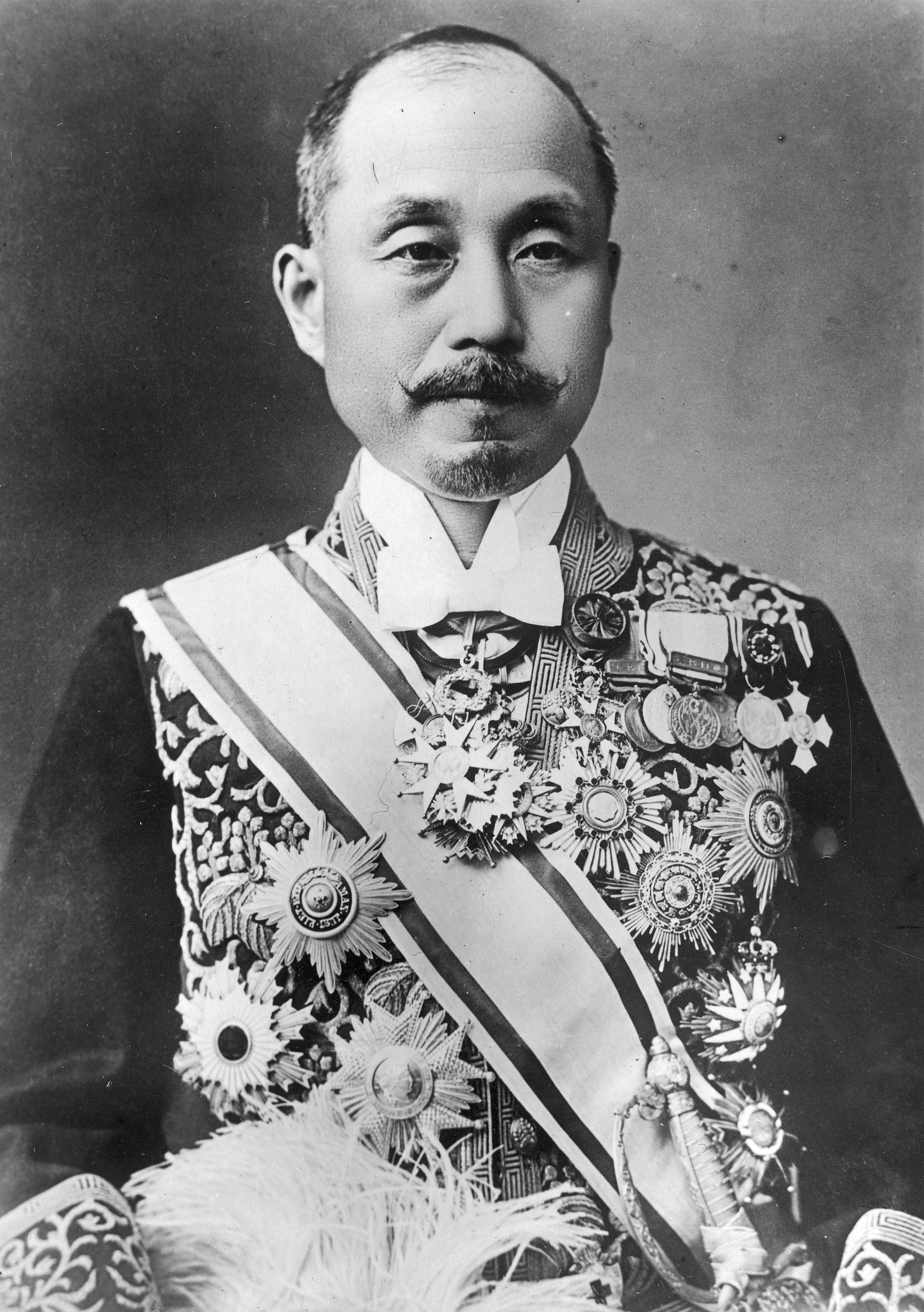
Adachi c. 1931–1934

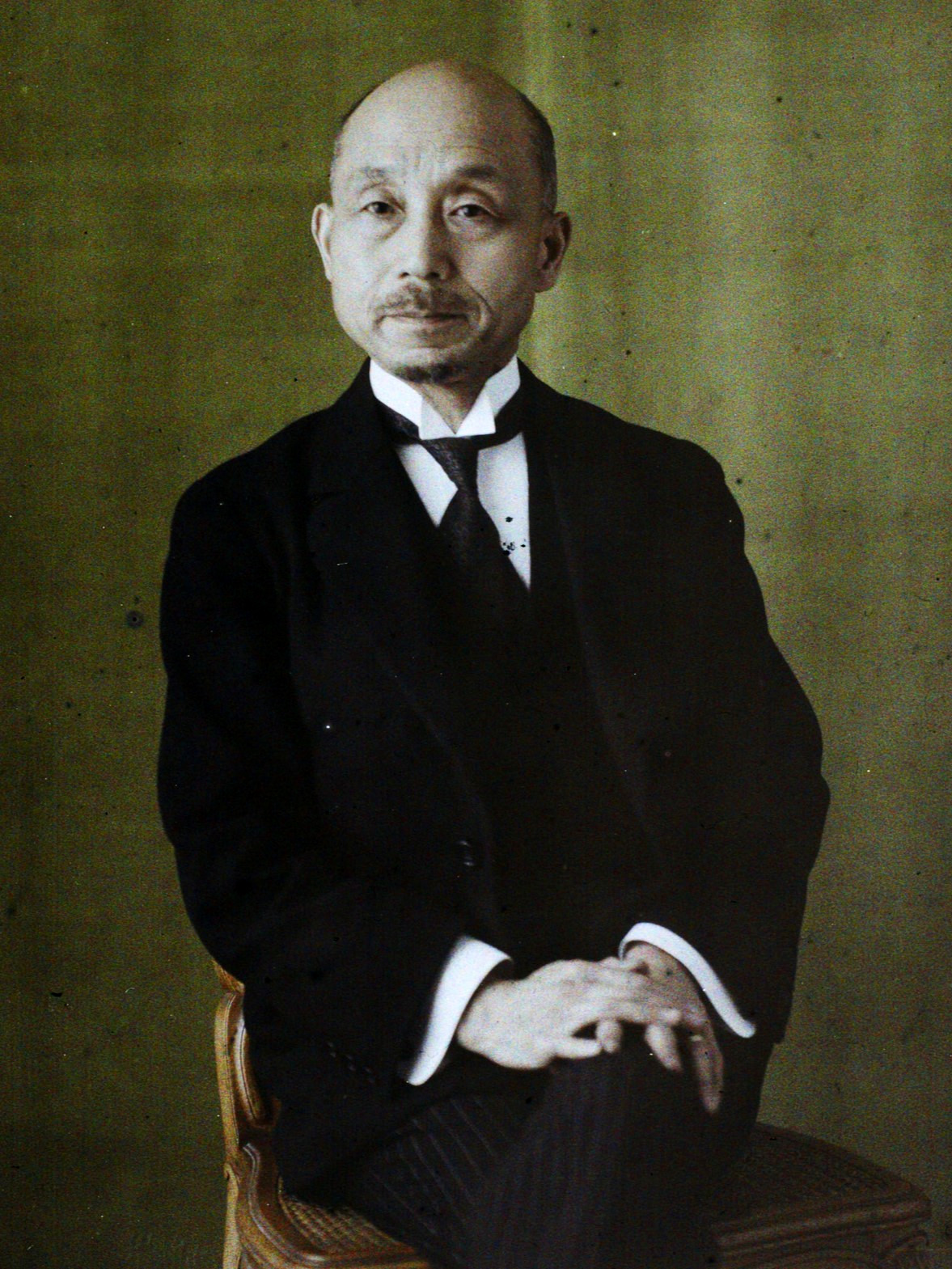
Autochrome portrait by Georges Chevalier, 1929

Mineichirō Adachi (安達 峰一郎, Adachi Mineichirō; July 29, 1869 – December 28, 1934) was a Japanese legal expert and President of the Permanent Court of International Justice at the Hague from 1931 until 1934.

== Early life ==
Adachi was born in what is now the town of Yamanobe, Yamagata, Japan. In 1892, he graduated from the law school of Tokyo University, and began his legal and diplomatic career.

== Legal and diplomatic work ==
In 1892–1893, he lectured on law at Tokyo University. In 1893, he was appointed Chargé d'affaires of the Japanese Legation in Rome, and served in that position until 1896. From 1899 to 1902, he served as Chargé d'affaires of the Japanese Legation in Paris. In 1903–1904, he served as Counsellor to the Japanese Ministry of Foreign Affairs and also taught international law and diplomatic history at Tokyo University. In 1904–1905, he sat as judge at the Sasebo and Yokosuka Prize Courts.

In 1905, he was a member of the Japanese delegation that negotiated in Portsmouth the peace treaty ending the Russo-Japanese War. In 1907–1910, he served again as Chargé d'affaires at the Japanese Legation in Paris, and in 1912–1915 served as Japanese Minister Plenipotentiary to Mexico. In 1915–1916, he took part in a Japanese Red Cross mission in Russia, then suffering from ravages of the First World War. In 1917, he was appointed Minister Plenipotentiary to Belgium, and in that capacity participated in the Japanese delegation to the Paris Peace Conference in 1919. During that conference, he also served as member of the Commission of Responsibilities, which recommended prosecuting German leaders accused of war crimes. From 1920 to 1927, he served as Ambassador to Belgium, and in 1927–1930 he was Ambassador to France.

On September 25, 1930, he was elected to serve as judge at the Permanent Court of International Justice. On January 16, 1931, he was elected President of the same court, a position he held until January 1, 1934, shortly prior to his death. He was elected a Foreign Honorary Member of the American Academy of Arts and Sciences in 1932. He died Amsterdam, Netherlands, on December 28, 1934.

During his tenure as President of the court, most of Adachi's rulings were in line with the majority opinions of the court, except for his ruling in September 1931 regarding the proposed Customs Union between Germany and Austria. As the majority opinion viewed that step as contravening the obligations of the German and Austrian governments not to compromise their own independence, Adachi claimed in his separate opinion that:

"Restrictions on its liberty of action which a State may agree to do not affect its independence, provided that the State does not thereby deprive itself of its organic powers".

His argument was that the proposed economic union did not compromise Austria's independence, just as membership in the League of Nations did not constitute a violation of that independence despite the practical restrictions it imposed on each one of its member states.

Funeral of Adachi Mineichirō on January 3, 1935, in The Hague. The news film shows the funeral procession, which starts at the Peace Palace and ends at the Cemetery at Kerkhoflaan (street name in The Hague)

== Works (partial list) ==
- Le Japon et les Traités Internationaux (1927)
