= List of ambassadors of Japan to the Holy See =

The List of Japanese ambassadors to the Holy See started when Harada Ken presented his credentials to Pius XII in 1942.

== List ==
This is a chronological list of Japanese diplomats.

Inaugural date	Official position (Japanese)	Official position	Name (Japanese)	Name
April 25, 1942	特命全権公使	Minister Plenipotentiary	原田 健	Harada Ken
January 27, 1946	Closed following the Japanese surrender of World War II			
April 28, 1952	臨時代理公使	Chargé d'affaires ad interim	金山 政英	Kanayama Masahide
July 2, 1952	臨時代理公使	Chargé d'affaires ad interim	吉浦 盛純	Yoshiura Morizumi
January 26, 1953	特命全権公使	Minister Plenipotentiary	井上 孝治郎	Inoue Kōjirō
October 30, 1955	臨時代理公使	Chargé d'affaires ad interim	芳賀 四郎	Haga Shirō
February 23, 1956	特命全権公使	Minister Plenipotentiary	鶴岡 千仭	Tsuruoka Senjin
April 4, 1958	特命全権大使	Ambassador	鶴岡 千仭	Tsuruoka Senjin
May 25, 1959	臨時代理大使	Chargé d'affaires ad interim	広瀬 達夫	Hirose Tatsuo
November 1, 1959	特命全権大使	Ambassador	吉岡 範武	Yoshioka Noritake
April 17, 1962	臨時代理大使	Chargé d'affaires ad interim	吉浦 盛純	Yoshiura Morizumi
May 8, 1962	特命全権大使	Ambassador	別府 節弥	Beppu Setsuya
January 7, 1965	臨時代理大使	Chargé d'affaires ad interim	吉川 紀彦	Yoshikawa Norihiko
January 26, 1965	特命全権大使	Ambassador	小川 清四郎	Ogawa Seishirō
November 16, 1967	臨時代理大使	Chargé d'affaires ad interim	西田 信夫	Nishida Nobuo
January 18, 1968	特命全権大使	Ambassador	田村 幸久	Tamura Yukihisa
February 10, 1970	臨時代理大使	Chargé d'affaires ad interim	田辺 健	Tanabe Ken
February 14, 1970	特命全権大使	Ambassador	服部 比左治	Hattori Hisaji
August 20, 1972	臨時代理大使	Chargé d'affaires ad interim	田辺 健	Tanabe Ken
September 25, 1972	特命全権大使	Ambassador	吉岡 俊夫	Yoshioka Toshio
November 26, 1974	臨時代理大使	Chargé d'affaires ad interim	石川 行男	Ishikawa Yukio
January 13, 1975	特命全権大使	Ambassador	猪名川 治郎	Inagawa Jirō
August 19, 1976	臨時代理大使	Chargé d'affaires ad interim	石川 行男	Ishikawa Yukio
September 15, 1976	特命全権大使	Ambassador	菅沼 潔	Suganuma Kiyoshi
August 7, 1980	臨時代理大使	Chargé d'affaires ad interim	山田 亮	Yamada Ryō
November 17, 1980	特命全権大使	Ambassador	太田 正己	Ōta Masami
February 26, 1983	臨時代理大使	Chargé d'affaires ad interim	楠田 正義	Kusuda Masayoshi
March 12, 1983	特命全権大使	Ambassador	中村 輝彦	Nakamura Teruhiko
September 16, 1985	臨時代理大使	Chargé d'affaires ad interim	林 要一	Hayashi Yōichi
September 26, 1985	特命全権大使	Ambassador	内田 園生	Uchida Sonoo
February 25, 1988	臨時代理大使	Chargé d'affaires ad interim	大島 愛高	Ōshima Aitaka
April 24, 1988	特命全権大使	Ambassador	小杉 照夫	Kosugi Teruo
July 21, 1990	臨時代理大使	Chargé d'affaires ad interim	大島 愛高	Ōshima Aitaka
July 26, 1990	特命全権大使	Ambassador	谷田 正躬	Tanida Masami

== See also ==
- Holy See–Japan relations
- Apostolic Nunciature to Japan
- Diplomatic rank
