= List of ambassadors of Japan to Poland =

The List of Japanese ministers, envoys and ambassadors to Poland started when Kawakami Toshitsune presented his credentials to the Polish government in 1921.

== List ==
This is a chronological list of Japanese diplomats.

Inaugural date	Official position (Japanese)	Official position	Name (Japanese)	Name
May 6, 1921	特命全権公使	Minister Plenipotentiary	川上 俊彦	Kawakami Toshitsune
January 15, 1923	臨時代理公使	Chargé d'affaires ad interim	井田 守三	Ida Morizo
October 29, 1923	特命全権公使	Minister Plenipotentiary	佐藤 尚武	Satō Naotake
March 1, 1925	臨時代理公使	Chargé d'affaires ad interim	松宮 順	Matsumiya Hajime
March 29, 1925	臨時代理公使	Chargé d'affaires ad interim	黒沢 二郎	Kurosawa Jirō
July 29, 1926	特命全権公使	Minister Plenipotentiary	佐藤 尚武	Satō Naotake
January 12, 1927	事務取扱	Office Administration	井上 豪	Inoue Tsuyoshi
February 6, 1927	臨時代理公使	Chargé d'affaires ad interim	二瓶 兵二	Nihei Heiji
October 8, 1927	臨時代理公使	Chargé d'affaires ad interim	千葉 蓁一	Chiba Shinichi
January 30, 1928	特命全権公使	Minister Plenipotentiary	松島 肇	Matsushima Hajime
January 6, 1930	臨時代理公使	Chargé d'affaires ad interim	渡辺 理恵	Watanabe Rie
June 25, 1931	特命全権公使	Minister Plenipotentiary	河合 博之	Kawai Hiroyuki
August 12, 1933	臨時代理公使	Chargé d'affaires ad interim	木下 武雄	Kinoshita Takeo
August 25, 1933	臨時代理公使	Chargé d'affaires ad interim	平田 稔	Hirata Minoru
December 9, 1933	臨時代理公使	Chargé d'affaires ad interim	嘉納 久一	Kano Hisakazu
December 22, 1933	特命全権公使	Minister Plenipotentiary	伊藤 述史	Itō Nobufumi
July 21, 1937	臨時代理公使	Chargé d'affaires ad interim	木村 惇	Kimura Atsushi
October 1, 1937	臨時代理大使	Chargé d'affaires ad interim	木村 惇	Kimura Atsushi
October 11, 1937	特命全権大使	Ambassador	酒匂 秀一	Sakō Shūichi
September, 1939	Closed following the World War II			
December 15, 1957	臨時代理大使	Chargé d'affaires ad interim	道正 久	Dosio Hisashi
December 31, 1957	特命全権大使	Ambassador	太田 三郎	Ōta Saburō
March 29, 1961	臨時代理大使	Chargé d'affaires ad interim	岡田 晃	Okada Akira
June 7, 1961	特命全権大使	Ambassador	河崎 一郎	Kawasaki Ichirō
January 27, 1967	臨時代理大使	Chargé d'affaires ad interim	末岡 日出徳	Sueoka Hidenori
May 11, 1967	特命全権大使	Ambassador	金山 政英	Kanayama Masahide
June 11, 1968	臨時代理大使	Chargé d'affaires ad interim	木村 敬三	Kimura Keizō
June 20, 1968	特命全権大使	Ambassador	中村 茂	Nakamura Shigeru
November 17, 1970	臨時代理大使	Chargé d'affaires ad interim	広岡 欣之助	Hirooka Kinnosuke
February 8, 1971	特命全権大使	Ambassador	力石 健次郎	Chikaraishi Kenjirō
August 29, 1972	臨時代理大使	Chargé d'affaires ad interim	山野 勝由	Yamano Katsuyoshi
November 16, 1972	特命全権大使	Ambassador	根本 驥	Nemoto Ki
March 7, 1975	臨時代理大使	Chargé d'affaires ad interim	小高 文直	Odaka Fuminao
March 28, 1975	特命全権大使	Ambassador	高杉 幹二	Takasugi Kanji
October 11, 1977	臨時代理大使	Chargé d'affaires ad interim	小崎 昌業	Ozaki Masanari
February 7, 1978	特命全権大使	Ambassador	堀新 助	Hori Shinsuke
October 4, 1980	臨時代理大使	Chargé d'affaires ad interim	飯田 稔	Iida Minoru
November 29, 1980	特命全権大使	Ambassador	原 冨士男	Hara Fujio
January 20, 1983	臨時代理大使	Chargé d'affaires ad interim	渡辺 俊夫	Watanabe Toshio
January 26, 1983	特命全権大使	Ambassador	松原 進	Matsubara Susumu
June 23, 1987	臨時代理大使	Chargé d'affaires ad interim	三橋 秀方	Mitsuhashi Hidekata
July 27, 1987	特命全権大使	Ambassador	秋保 光孝	Akiho Mitsutaka
March 1, 1990	臨時代理大使	Chargé d'affaires ad interim	宮本 信生	Miyamoto Nobuo
April 1, 1990	特命全権大使	Ambassador	山下 新太郎	Yamashita Shintarō

== See also ==
- Japan-Poland relations
- Diplomatic rank
