= List of ambassadors of Japan to Portugal =

The List of Japanese ambassadors to Portugal started when Kasama Akio presented his credentials to the Portuguese government in 1932.

Japan and Portugal established diplomatic relations in 1860, but Japanese ministers to France and Spain concurrently served as minister to Portugal. The Japanese legation was opened in Lisbon in 1932.

== List ==
This is a chronological list of Japanese diplomats.

Inaugural date	Official position (Japanese)	Official position	Name (Japanese)	Name
October 31, 1932	臨時代理公使	Chargé d'affaires ad interim	隈部 種樹	Kumabe Taneki
December 4, 1932	特命全権公使	Minister Plenipotentiary	笠間 杲雄	Kasama Akio
August 29, 1934	臨時代理公使	Chargé d'affaires ad interim	隈部 種樹	Kumabe Taneki
September 21, 1936	臨時代理公使	Chargé d'affaires ad interim	大森 元一郎	Omori Genichirō
May 13, 1938	臨時代理公使	Chargé d'affaires ad interim	柳沢 健	Yanazawa Ken
September 24, 1939	特命全権公使	Minister Plenipotentiary	米沢 菊二	Yonezawa Kikuji
March 26, 1941	特命全権公使	Minister Plenipotentiary	千葉 蓁一	Chiba Shinichi
October 21, 1942	特命全権公使	Minister Plenipotentiary	森島 守人	Morishima Morito
January 19, 1946	Closed following the Japanese surrender of World War II			
March 15, 1954	臨時代理公使	Chargé d'affaires ad interim	高橋 明	Takahashi Akira
March 15, 1955	特命全権公使	Minister Plenipotentiary	神田 襄太郎	Kanda Jōtarō
June 25, 1957	臨時代理公使	Chargé d'affaires ad interim	岩瀬 幸	Iwase Kō
January 6, 1958	特命全権公使	Minister Plenipotentiary	磯野 勇三	Isono Yuzo
April 7, 1959	特命全権大使	Ambassador	磯野 勇三	Isono Yuzo
August 9, 1961	臨時代理大使	Chargé d'affaires ad interim	加藤 惣助	Katō Sōsuke
October 27, 1961	特命全権大使	Ambassador	吉田 賢吉	Yoshida Kenkichi
December 8, 1965	臨時代理大使	Chargé d'affaires ad interim	伊藤 卓也	Itō Takuya
January 17, 1966	特命全権大使	Ambassador	勝野 康助	Katsuno Yasusuke
January 20, 1968	臨時代理大使	Chargé d'affaires ad interim	伊藤 卓也	Itō Takuya
February 20, 1968	特命全権大使	Ambassador	服部 五郎	Hattori Gorō
June 19, 1971	臨時代理大使	Chargé d'affaires ad interim	上野 毅夫	Ueno Takeo
September 6, 1971	特命全権大使	Ambassador	和田 周作	Wada Shusaku
December 24, 1974	臨時代理大使	Chargé d'affaires ad interim	安部 正康	Abe Masayasu
February 27, 1975	特命全権大使	Ambassador	大口 信夫	Oguchi Nobuo
May 18, 1977	臨時代理大使	Chargé d'affaires ad interim	安部 正康	Abe Masayasu
May 24, 1977	特命全権大使	Ambassador	谷 盛規	Tani Moriki
January 2, 1981	臨時代理大使	Chargé d'affaires ad interim	縫村 義則	Nuimura Yoshinori
January 30, 1981	特命全権大使	Ambassador	田村 豊	Tamura Yutaka
June 27, 1983	臨時代理大使	Chargé d'affaires ad interim	須山 章	Suyama Akira
July 2, 1983	特命全権大使	Ambassador	岡田 富美也	Okada Fumiya
October 27, 1987	臨時代理大使	Chargé d'affaires ad interim	戸田 勝規	Toda Katsunori
November 30, 1987	特命全権大使	Ambassador	村上 和夫	Murakami Kazuo
December 5, 1990	臨時代理大使	Chargé d'affaires ad interim	清水 訓夫	Shimizu Kunio
January 8, 1991	特命全権大使	Ambassador	平岡 千之	Hiraoka Chiyuki

== See also ==
- Japan–Portugal relations
- Diplomatic rank
