= List of ambassadors of Japan to Algeria =

Japanese Ambassador to Algeria
- Emblem of Japan
- Incumbent; Tsukasa Kawada
- Website: http://www.dz.emb-japan.go.jp/

The list of ambassadors from Japan to Algeria started when the first diplomat presented his credentials to the Algerian government in 1964.

Diplomatic relations were established in 1962. The embassy in Algiers opened in 1964.

== List ==
- Tsukasa Kawada
