= Japanese Chileans =

Japonés Chileno 日系チリ人

Total population
- 3,800

Regions with significant populations
- Arica, Iquique, Antofagasta, La Serena, Valparaíso, Viña del Mar, Santiago, Talagante

Languages
- Spanish, Japanese

Religion
- Roman Catholicism, Buddhism, Shinto

Related ethnic groups
- Japanese diaspora, Japanese Americans, Japanese Canadians, Japanese Mexicans, Japanese Peruvians

Japanese Chileans (Spanish: Japonés Chileno or Nipo-chileno; Japanese: 日系チリ人, Nikkei Chiri-jin) are Chileans with ethnic origin from Japan. The first Japanese in Chile were 126 immigrants hired to work in the mining industry in 1903. As of 2010, Japan's Ministry of Foreign Affairs estimated there to be a total of roughly 2,600 Japanese people living in Chile. Among them were 1,108 temporary residents, 504 permanent residents and approximately a thousand born locally.

== History ==
The number of Japanese settlers in Chile never exceeded 900 between 1910 and 1940. Among those who entered the nation, there was a wide diversity of occupations ranging from professionals and businessmen to laborers re-migrating from neighboring countries, especially Peru which has the second largest Japanese population in Latin America and the sixth largest in world. They mostly settled in the nitrate-rich north and to the southern regions of Valparaíso and Santiago. They found employment in a variety of jobs as salaried workers and in small business interests, especially as barbers. The early Nikkei community was largely male. The majority of Issei men married Chilean women. Their children, the Nisei, were raised with the belief of "If they are going to live in Chile, let them be Chilean".

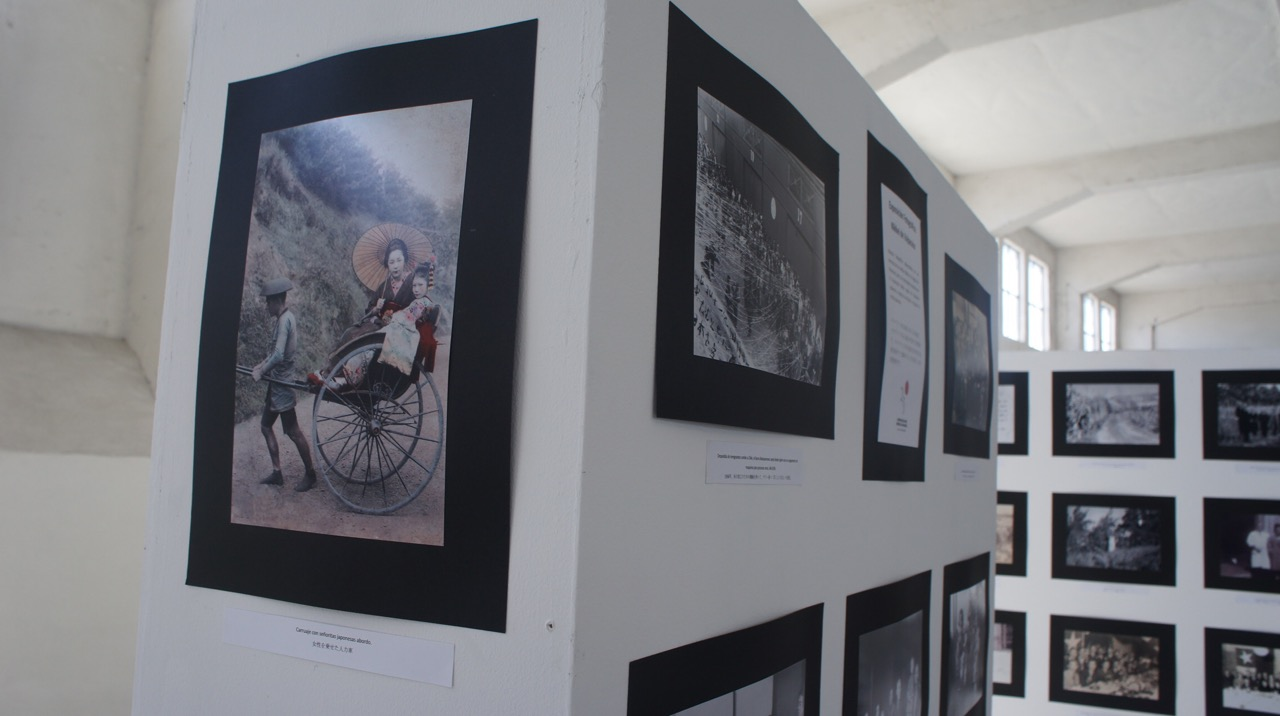
Photo Exposition of the Japanese Immigration to Chile by the Corporación Nikkei Región de Valparaíso

However, World War II incited anti-Japanese sentiments and interrupted the Nikkei’s process of integration into Chilean society. Starting in early 1943, several dozen Japanese Chileans were forced to move from strategically sensitive areas (such as copper mines) to the interior of the country. Meanwhile, the Japanese community became more united, offering mutual support in the face of wartime oppositions. These ties would later be formalized after the war with the organization of the Japanese Beneficence Society (Sociedad Japonesa de Beneficencia).

By the 1990s, Chilean Nikkei enjoyed middle-class status, a high educational level, and employment in white-collar jobs. Contrary to trends in other Latin American countries with a Nikkei population, less than 5% of the ethnic Japanese population has gone to Japan to work as dekasegis. The small size of the Japanese community, its lack of unity, and the increase of mixed marriages call into question the future of the Chilean Nikkei. There are an estimated 3,800 Japanese and people of Japanese descent in Chile.

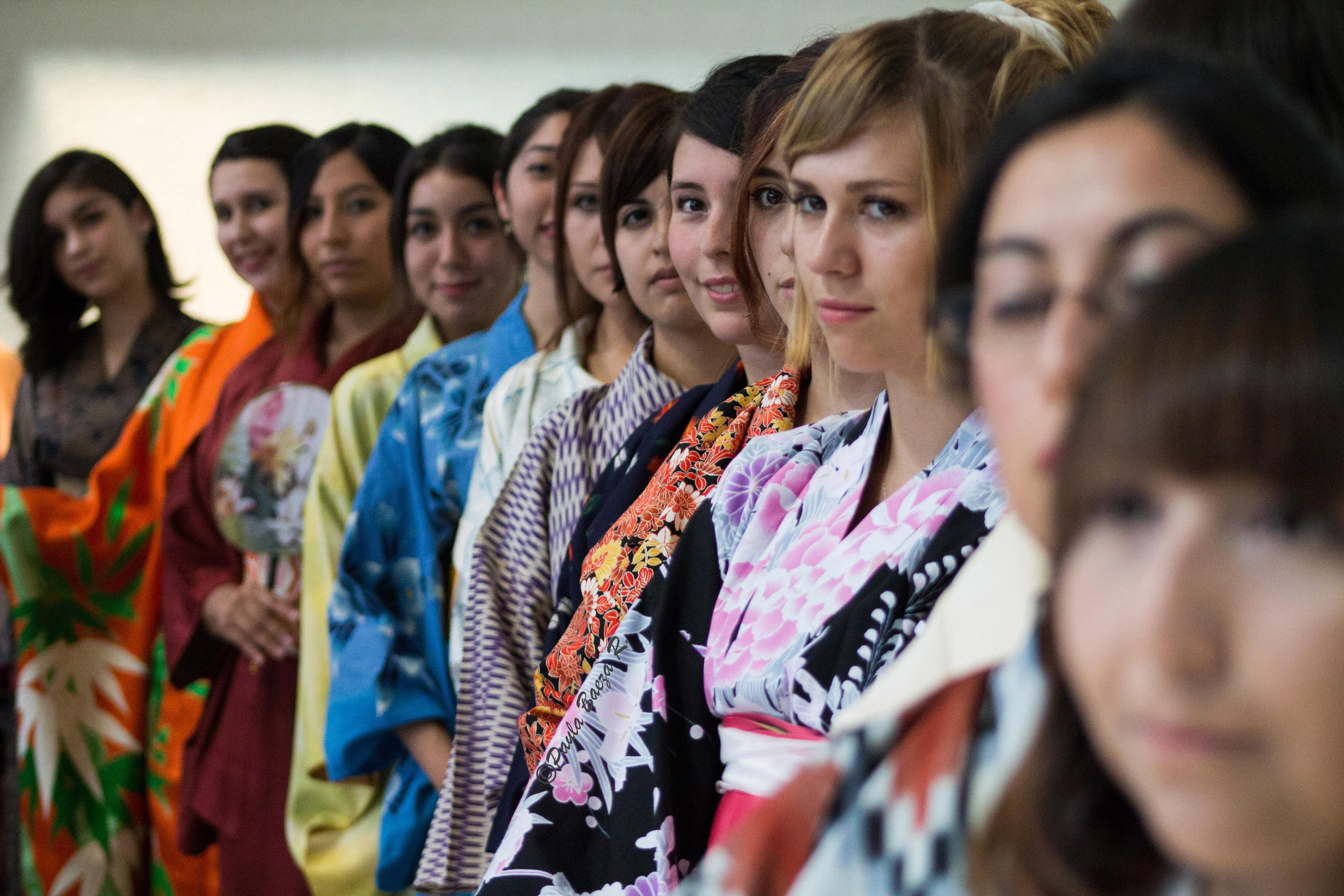
Kimono Fashion Show by the Corporación Nikkei Región de Valparaíso

Today, the new generations are maintaining some of their traditions, such as the Japanese language and cultural events such as Hanami, and the Valparaíso Japan Festival through organizations such as the Valparaíso Región Nikkei Corporation (Corporación Nikkei Región de Valparaíso).

== Religion ==
The majority of Japanese Chileans are Roman Catholic Christians, while the rest are Buddhists and Shintoists.

== Notable people ==
- Carlos Ominami, senator
- Nozomi Kimura, professional footballer

== See also ==
- Chile–Japan relations
- Japanese diaspora
- Immigration to Chile
