= List of ambassadors of Japan to Greece =

The List of Japanese ambassadors to Greece started when Okuyama Seiji presented his credentials to the Greek government in 1924.

== List ==
This is a chronological list of Japanese diplomats.

Inaugural date	Official position (Japanese)	Official position	Name (Japanese)	Name
October 31, 1922	臨時代理公使	Chargé d'affaires ad interim	諸井 六郎	Moroi Rokurō
February 2, 1924	臨時代理公使	Chargé d'affaires ad interim	見田 寛	Mita Kakehi
February 26, 1924	臨時代理公使	Chargé d'affaires ad interim	奥山 清治	Okuyama Seiji
May 20, 1924	特命全権公使	Minister Plenipotentiary	奥山 清治	Okuyama Seiji
May 26, 1926	外交官補	a probationary diplomat	浅田 俊介	Asada Shunsuke
June 12, 1926	臨時代理公使	Chargé d'affaires ad interim	来栖 三郎	Kurusu Saburō
February 14, 1927	特命全権公使	Minister Plenipotentiary	川島 信太郎	Kawashima Shintarō
December 7, 1928	臨時代理公使	Chargé d'affaires ad interim	宮腰 千葉太	Miyakoshi Chibata
January 4, 1930	特命全権公使	Minister Plenipotentiary	川島 信太郎	Kawashima Shintarō
September 28, 1932	臨時代理公使	Chargé d'affaires ad interim	嘉納 久一	Kano Hisakazu
November 20, 1933	臨時代理公使	Chargé d'affaires ad interim	三枝 茂智	Saegusa Shigetomo
September 21, 1935	臨時代理公使	Chargé d'affaires ad interim	黒沢 二郎	Kurosawa Jirō
August 12, 1936	臨時代理公使	Chargé d'affaires ad interim	渡辺 信雄	Watanabe Nobuo
June 30, 1937	Closed			
April 1, 1956	臨時代理大使	Chargé d'affaires ad interim	藤 健一	Fuji Kenichi
January 28, 1959	臨時代理大使	Chargé d'affaires ad interim	下田 吉人	Shimoda Yoshito
May 11, 1960	特命全権大使	Ambassador	黒田 音四郎	Kuroda Otoshirō
February 22, 1963	臨時代理大使	Chargé d'affaires ad interim	橋田 親太郎	Hashida Chikatarō
March 5, 1963	特命全権大使	Ambassador	土屋 隼	Tsuchiya Jun
February 28, 1965	臨時代理大使	Chargé d'affaires ad interim	橋田 親太郎	Hashida Chikatarō
March 13, 1965	臨時代理大使	Chargé d'affaires ad interim	沢木 正男	Sawaki Masao
July 28, 1965	特命全権大使	Ambassador	大隈 渉	Ōkuma Wataru
November 1, 1967	臨時代理大使	Chargé d'affaires ad interim	原田 親満	Harada Chikamitsu
November 26, 1967	特命全権大使	Ambassador	高木 広一	Takagi Hiroichi
November 23, 1969	臨時代理大使	Chargé d'affaires ad interim	原田 親満	Harada Chikamitsu
December 6, 1969	特命全権大使	Ambassador	高橋 明	Takahashi Akira
April 14, 1972	臨時代理大使	Chargé d'affaires ad interim	菊池 万清	Kikuchi Kuzukiyo
May 30, 1972	特命全権大使	Ambassador	安藤 龍一	Andō Ryūichi
May 16, 1974	臨時代理大使	Chargé d'affaires ad interim	大田 泰彦	Ōta Yasuhiko
July 12, 1974	特命全権大使	Ambassador	神原 富比古	Kanbara Tomihiko
May 15, 1976	臨時代理大使	Chargé d'affaires ad interim	最賀 四郎	Saiga Shirō
July 21, 1976	特命全権大使	Ambassador	徳久 茂	Tokuhisa Shigeru
March 13, 1979	臨時代理大使	Chargé d'affaires ad interim	鈴木 敦也	Suzuki Atsuya
June 12, 1979	特命全権大使	Ambassador	長谷川 孝昭	Hasegawa Takaaki
December 1, 1981	臨時代理大使	Chargé d'affaires ad interim	茨木 正雄	Ibaraki Masao
December 22, 1981	特命全権大使	Ambassador	吉田 長雄	Yoshida Nagao
November 27, 1984	臨時代理大使	Chargé d'affaires ad interim	角田 勝彦	Tsunoda Katsuhiko
March 13, 1985	特命全権大使	Ambassador	田中 常雄	Tanaka Tsuneo
January 26, 1988	臨時代理大使	Chargé d'affaires ad interim	富川 明憲	Mikawa Arinori
March 1, 1988	特命全権大使	Ambassador	金子 一夫	Kaneko Kazuo
August 7, 1990	臨時代理大使	Chargé d'affaires ad interim	三橋 秀方	Mitsuhashi Hidekata
September 4, 1990	特命全権大使	Ambassador	薮 忠綱	Yabu Tadatsuna

== See also ==
- Greece–Japan relations
- Diplomatic rank
