= List of ambassadors of Japan to Cuba =

The List of Japanese ambassadors to Cuba started when Kanda Jōtarō presented his credentials to the Cuban government in 1957.

Japan and Cuba established diplomatic relations in 1930, but it was not until 1953 that a Japanese legation was opened in Havana.

== List ==
This is a chronological list of Japanese diplomats.

Inaugural date	Official position (Japanese)	Official position	Name (Japanese)	Name
25 November 1953	臨時代理公使	Chargé d'affaires ad interim	井沢 実	Izawa Minoru
27 March 1956	臨時代理公使	Chargé d'affaires ad interim	福島 茂吉	Fukushima Shigeyoshi
10 July 1957	特命全権大使	Ambassador	神田 襄太郎	Kanda Jōtarō
3 January 1960	臨時代理大使	Chargé d'affaires ad interim	片岡 孝三郎	Kataoka Kōzaburō
26 March 1961	特命全権大使	Ambassador	都村 新次郎	Tsumura Shinjirō
28 September 1962	臨時代理大使	Chargé d'affaires ad interim	片岡 孝三郎	Kataoka Kōzaburō
26 October 1962	特命全権大使	Ambassador	矢口 麓蔵	Yaguchi Rokurō
2 April 1966	臨時代理大使	Chargé d'affaires ad interim	兼田 晴重	Kaneda Harushige
9 January 1967	特命全権大使	Ambassador	佐藤 崎人	Satō Sakito
28 July 1969	臨時代理大使	Chargé d'affaires ad interim	伊藤 武好	Itō Takeyoshi
4 August 1969	特命全権大使	Ambassador	近藤 四郎	Kondō Shirō
7 August 1972	臨時代理大使	Chargé d'affaires ad interim	堅山 道助	Tateyama Michisuke
20 October 1972	特命全権大使	Ambassador	片岡 秋	Kataoka Osamu
21 February 1975	臨時代理大使	Chargé d'affaires ad interim	堅山 道助	Tateyama Michisuke
1 April 1975	特命全権大使	Ambassador	奈良 賀男	Nara Yoshio
16 May 1977	臨時代理大使	Chargé d'affaires ad interim	長田 光雄	Nagada Mitsuo
13 July 1977	特命全権大使	Ambassador	穂崎 巧	Hozaki Takumi
12 February 1981	臨時代理大使	Chargé d'affaires ad interim	平松 弘行	Hiramatsu Hiroyuki
27 February 1981	特命全権大使	Ambassador	塚本 政雄	Tsukamoto Masao
24 October 1983	臨時代理大使	Chargé d'affaires ad interim	久保 光弘	Kubo Mitsuhiro
28 December 1983	特命全権大使	Ambassador	馬淵 晴之	Mabuchi Haruyuki
14 January 1987	臨時代理大使	Chargé d'affaires ad interim	鈴木 邦治	Suzuki Kuniji
11 March 1987	特命全権大使	Ambassador	井出 亮	Ide Ryō

== See also ==
- Cuba–Japan relations
- Diplomatic rank
