= List of ambassadors of Japan to Angola =

Japanese Ambassador to Angola
- Emblem of Japan
- Incumbent; Ryōzō Myōi
- Website: http://www.angola.emb-japan.go.jp/index_j.htm

The list of ambassadors from Japan to Angola started when the first Japanese diplomat presented his credentials to the Angolan government in 1976.

Diplomatic relations were established in 1976.

== List ==
- Tsunneshige Liyam
- Susumu Shibata
- Kazuhiko Koshikawa
- Ryōzō Myōi
