= List of ambassadors of Japan to Lithuania =

Japanese Ambassador to Lithuania
- Emblem of Japan
- Incumbent; Kazuko Shiraishi
- Website: http://www.lt.emb-japan.go.jp/

The list of ambassadors of Japan to Lithuania started when Miyoko Akashi presented her credentials to the Lithuanian government in 2008.

Diplomatic relations were reestablished in 1991 (first time relations where established in 1922). The embassy in Vilnius opened in 1997

== List ==
- Miyoko Akashi
- Kazuko Shiraishi

== See also ==
- Chiune Sugihara
