= List of ambassadors of Japan to Spain =

The List of Japanese ambassadors to Spain started when Akabane Shirō presented his credentials to the Spanish government in 1901.

== List ==
This is a chronological list of Japanese diplomats.

Inaugural date	Official position (Japanese)	Official position	Name (Japanese)	Name
January 8, 1901	特命全権公使	Minister Plenipotentiary	赤羽 四郎	Akabane Shirō
February 7, 1907	特命全権公使	Minister Plenipotentiary	稲垣 満次郎	Inagaki Manjirō
November 25, 1908	臨時代理公使	Chargé d'affaires ad interim	丸尾 直利	Maruo Naokazu
April 28, 1910	特命全権公使	Minister Plenipotentiary	荒川 巳次	Arakawa Minoji
September 8, 1913	臨時代理公使	Chargé d'affaires ad interim	堀口 九萬一	Horiguchi Kumaichi
August 7, 1917	特命全権公使	Minister Plenipotentiary	坂田 重次郎	Sakada Shyūjirō
November 26, 1919	臨時代理公使	Chargé d'affaires ad interim	三浦 荒次郎	Miura Arajirō
April 27, 1921	特命全権公使	Minister Plenipotentiary	広沢 金次郎	Hirosawa Kinjirō
November 9, 1924	臨時代理公使	Chargé d'affaires ad interim	甘利 造次	Amari Zoji
February 4, 1926	特命全権公使	Minister Plenipotentiary	太田 為吉	Ōta Tamekichi
April 4, 1929	臨時代理公使	Chargé d'affaires ad interim	荒井 金太	Arai Kinta
May 12, 1930	特命全権公使	Minister Plenipotentiary	太田 為吉	Ōta Tamekichi
April 21, 1932	臨時代理公使	Chargé d'affaires ad interim	越田 佐一郎	Koshida Saichirō
November 3, 1932	特命全権公使	Minister Plenipotentiary	青木 新	Aoki Arata
January 11, 1936	臨時代理公使	Chargé d'affaires ad interim	高岡 禎一郎	Takaoka Teiichirō
May 24, 1936	特命全権公使	Minister Plenipotentiary	矢野 真	Yano Makoto
December 18, 1937	臨時代理公使	Chargé d'affaires ad interim	高田 実	Takada Minoru
December 29, 1937	臨時代理公使	Chargé d'affaires ad interim	高岡 禎一郎	Takaoka Teiichirō
November 8, 1938	特命全権公使	Minister Plenipotentiary	矢野 真	Yano Makoto
May 27, 1940	特命全権公使	Minister Plenipotentiary	横山 正幸	Yokoyama Masayuki
September 21, 1940	臨時代理公使	Chargé d'affaires ad interim	高田 実	Takada Minoru
October 13, 1940	臨時代理公使	Chargé d'affaires ad interim	藤井 慶三	Fujii Keizo
January 30, 1941	特命全権公使	Minister Plenipotentiary	須磨 弥吉郎	Suma Yakichirō
January 21, 1946	Closed following the Japanese surrender of World War II			
December 24, 1951	在マドリード在外事務所長	Chief of the Japanese Government's Overseas Agency in Madrid	矢口 麓蔵	Yaguchi Rokurō
November 22, 1952	特命全権大使	Ambassador	渋沢 信一	Shibusawa Shinichi
February 16, 1956	臨時代理大使	Chargé d'affaires ad interim	服部 五郎	Hattori Gorō
March 11, 1956	特命全権大使	Ambassador	与謝野 秀	Yosano Shigeru
July 3, 1961	臨時代理大使	Chargé d'affaires ad interim	白幡 友敬	Shirahata Tomoyoshi
May 2, 1959	特命全権大使	Ambassador	鈴木 九萬	Suzuki Tadakatsu
May 26, 1961	臨時代理大使	Chargé d'affaires ad interim	近藤 四郎	Kondō Shirō
September 19, 1961	特命全権大使	Ambassador	島津 久大	Shimazu Hisanaga
January 19, 1963	臨時代理大使	Chargé d'affaires ad interim	近藤 四郎	Kondō Shirō
October 23, 1963	特命全権大使	Ambassador	関 守三郎	Seki Morisaburō
March 27, 1967	臨時代理大使	Chargé d'affaires ad interim	川並 将慶	Kawanami Masayoshi
May 15, 1967	特命全権大使	Ambassador	高野 藤吉	Takano Tokichi
July 14, 1969	臨時代理大使	Chargé d'affaires ad interim	津田 天瑞	Tsuda Takayoshi
September 18, 1969	特命全権大使	Ambassador	高橋 覚	Takahashi Satoru
February 7, 1973	臨時代理大使	Chargé d'affaires ad interim	枝村 純郎	Edamura Sumio
March 8, 1973	特命全権大使	Ambassador	佐藤 正二	Satō Shōji
August 12, 1975	臨時代理大使	Chargé d'affaires ad interim	山下 和夫	Yamashita Kazuo
January 19, 1976	特命全権大使	Ambassador	加川 隆明	Kagawa Takaaki
July 17, 1978	臨時代理大使	Chargé d'affaires ad interim	遠藤 実	Endō Minoru
July 21, 1978	特命全権大使	Ambassador	横田 弘	Yokoda Hiroshi
July 16, 1981	臨時代理大使	Chargé d'affaires ad interim	中曽根 悟郎	Nakasone Gorō
September 19, 1981	特命全権大使	Ambassador	林屋 永吉	Hayashiya Eikichi
September 25, 1984	臨時代理大使	Chargé d'affaires ad interim	浦辺 彬	Urabe Akira
October 2, 1984	特命全権大使	Ambassador	枝村 純郎	Edamura Sumio
September 13, 1987	臨時代理大使	Chargé d'affaires ad interim	浦辺 彬	Urabe Akira
December 1, 1987	特命全権大使	Ambassador	石井 亨	Ishii Toru

== See also ==
- Japanese people in Spain
- Japan–Spain relations
- Diplomatic rank
