= Chile–Japan relations =

- Chile: Japan

Chile–Japan relations are the bilateral relations between the Republic of Chile and Japan. Both nations are members of the Asia-Pacific Economic Cooperation, Comprehensive and Progressive Agreement for Trans-Pacific Partnership, Forum of East Asia–Latin America Cooperation the Organisation for Economic Co-operation and Development and the United Nations.

== History ==
=== Early relations ===
Early knowledge of Chile and Japan would have been through Spanish merchants who traded via the Manila Galleon from Acapulco, Mexico and Manila, Philippines as well as through Spanish missionaries. In Manila, the Spanish traded with Japanese merchants and brought their products to Spanish America (as Chile at the time was part of the Spanish Empire. In 1818, Chile declared its independence from Spain. In 1860, a Japanese ship arrived to the Chilean port of Valparaíso. In October 1868, Japan entered the Meiji period and began fostering diplomatic relations with several nations, after decades of isolation. In 1890, Chile opened a consulate in the Japanese port-city of Yokohama.

In 1894, Chile sold Japan a naval ship called Esmeralda III. Japan re-batized the ship as the Izumi. On 25 September 1897, Chile and Japan officially established diplomatic relations with the signing of the Treaty of Friendship, Commerce and Navigation. That same year, Chile opened a diplomatic legation in Tokyo and two years later, the first Chilean ambassador arrived to Japan and presented his credentials to the Meiji Emperor. In 1909, Japan opened a diplomatic legation in Santiago.

=== World War II and Post-War relations ===
On 20 January 1943, Chile severed diplomatic relations with the Axis powers during World War II, and it began imprisoning Japanese nationals that same year. Like most Latin-American nations, Chile did not physically participate in the war. Diplomatic relations between Chile and Japan were re-established on 7 October 1952.

In 1959, Nobusuke Kishi became the first Japanese Prime Minister to visit Chile. After the restoration of democracy in Chile, Patricio Aylwin became the first Chilean President to visit Japan in 1992. Since the initial visits, there have been numerous high-level visits between both nations. Chile and Japan are both initial signatories of the Trans-Pacific Partnership, an agreement that they worked closely with ten other Pacific Rim nations. Since the United States withdrew from the agreement in January 2017, Chile and Japan have worked with the remaining nine countries and signed the Comprehensive and Progressive Agreement for Trans-Pacific Partnership in March 2018 in Santiago.

On 25 September 2017, both nations celebrated 120 years of diplomatic relations. To initiate the celebrations, Japanese Prince Akishino paid a 10-day visit to Chile.

== High-level visits ==
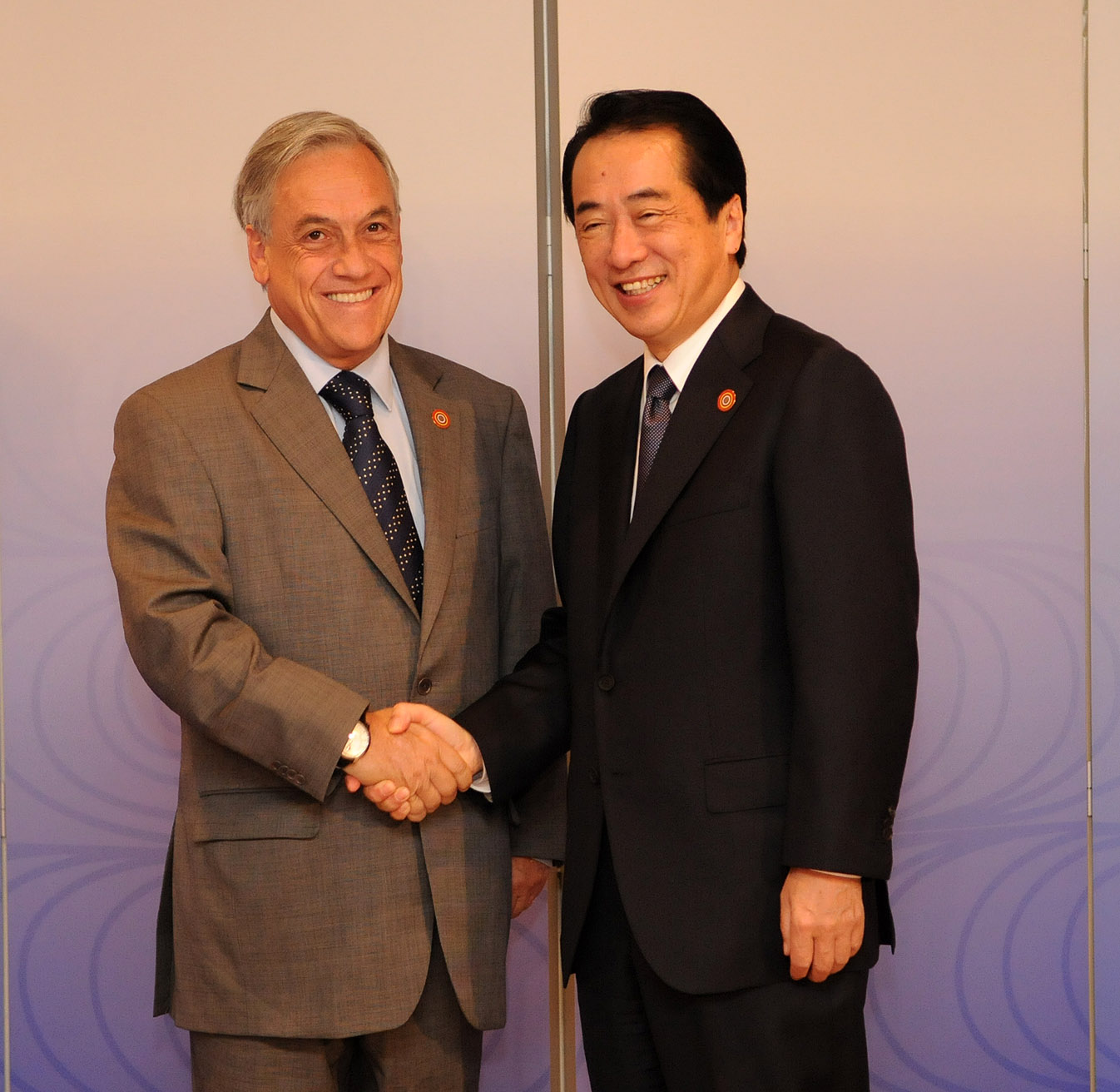
Chilean President Sebastián Piñera meeting with Japanese Prime Minister Naoto Kan in Tokyo, 2010.

High-level visits from Chile to Japan

- President Patricio Aylwin (1992)
- President Eduardo Frei Ruiz-Tagle (1994, 1995 & 1997)
- President Ricardo Lagos (2003)
- President Michelle Bachelet (2007 & 2018)
- President Sebastián Piñera (2010 & 2012)
- President José Antonio Kast (2026)

High-level visits from Japan to Chile

- Prime Minister Nobusuke Kishi (1959)
- Prince Hitachi (1993 & 1997)
- Prime Minister Ryutaro Hashimoto (1996)
- Prime Minister Junichiro Koizumi (2004)
- Prime Minister Shinzō Abe (2014)
- Prince Akishino (2017)

== Bilateral relations ==
Both nations have signed several bilateral agreements such as a Treaty of Friendship, Commerce and Navigation (1897); Treaty of Peace (1951); Agreement on Technical Cooperation (1978); Agreement to establish the Japan International Cooperation Agency in Chile (1988); Agreement to establish a Japanese volunteer program to ensure technical cooperation between both nations (1996); Agreement on the Assessment of Carbon Fixing in Chilean Forest Ecosystems (2005) and an Agreement on the Avoidance of Double Taxation and Tax Evasion (2016).

== Trade ==
In 2006, Chile and Japan signed a free trade agreement which entered into force in November 2007. In 2017, trade between Chile and Japan totaled US$8.3 billion (911 billion Yen). Chilean exports to Japan include copper, fish (salmon and trout), woodchips, lithium and molybdenum; while Japanese exports to Chile include automobiles, auto parts, tires, construction and mining equipment. Japanese direct investment in 2016 to Chile totaled US$237 million. Japanese corporations are large and recurrent investors in the Chilean copper mining industry, beginning with Mitsubishi Corporation's investment in Minera Escondida in 1985. Mitsubishi Corporation has also invested in Chile's largest iron mining company Compañía Minera del Pacífico, owning 25% of it since 2010. In the 1970s and 1980s Japanese engineers from Kobe Steel were crucial for the installment of Planta de Pellets which processes iron ore at the port of Huasco.

Several well known multinational Japanese companies such as Honda, Sony, Toshiba, Nissan, Komatsu and Toyota (among others) operate in Chile.

Japanese cultural and media exports to Chile include anime, J-pop, video games, language education, and food, which have had a significant impact on many young Chileans.

== Resident diplomatic missions ==
- Chile has an embassy (ja) in Tokyo.
- Japan has an embassy (ja) in Santiago.
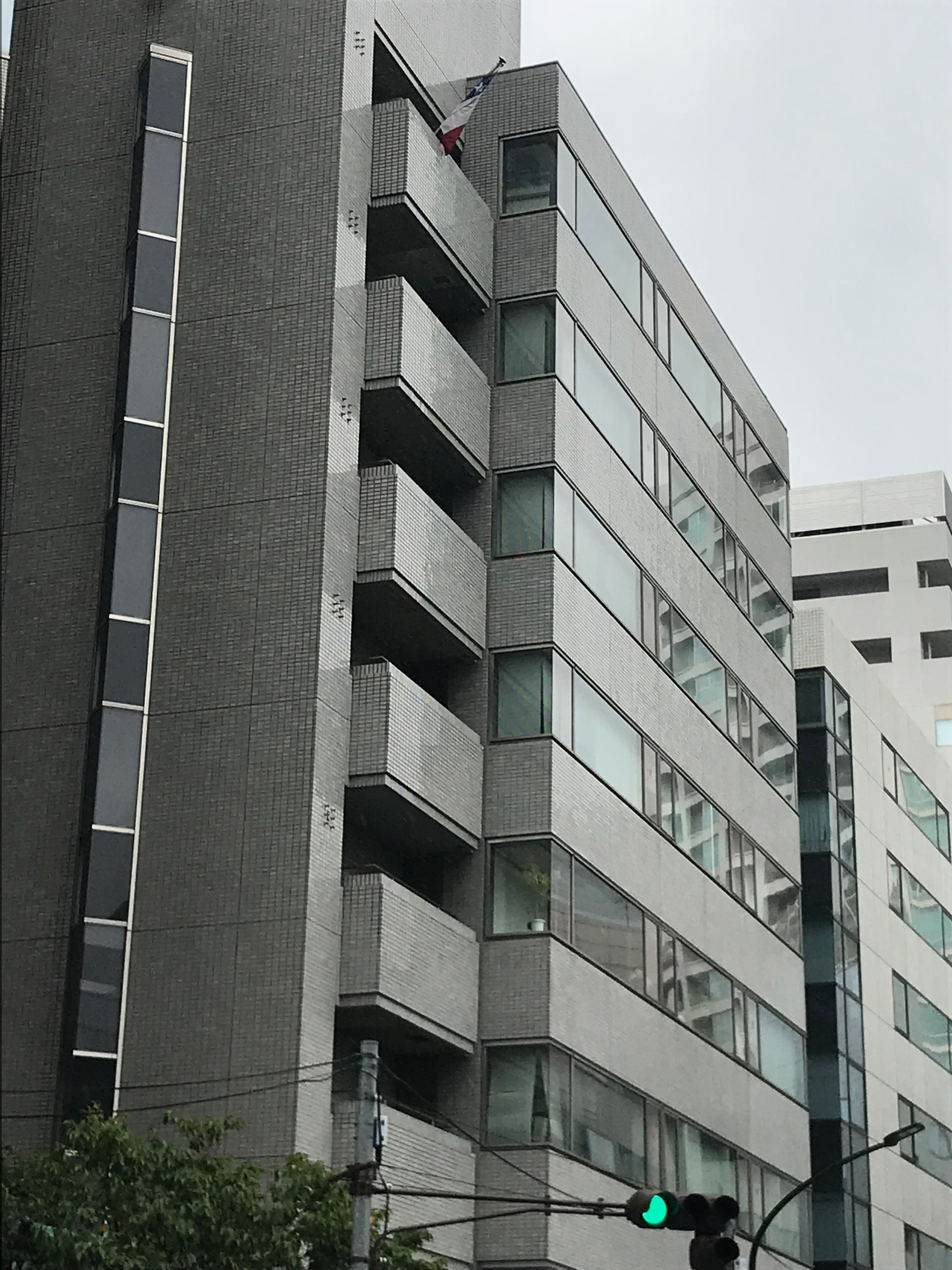
Embassy of Chile in Tokyo

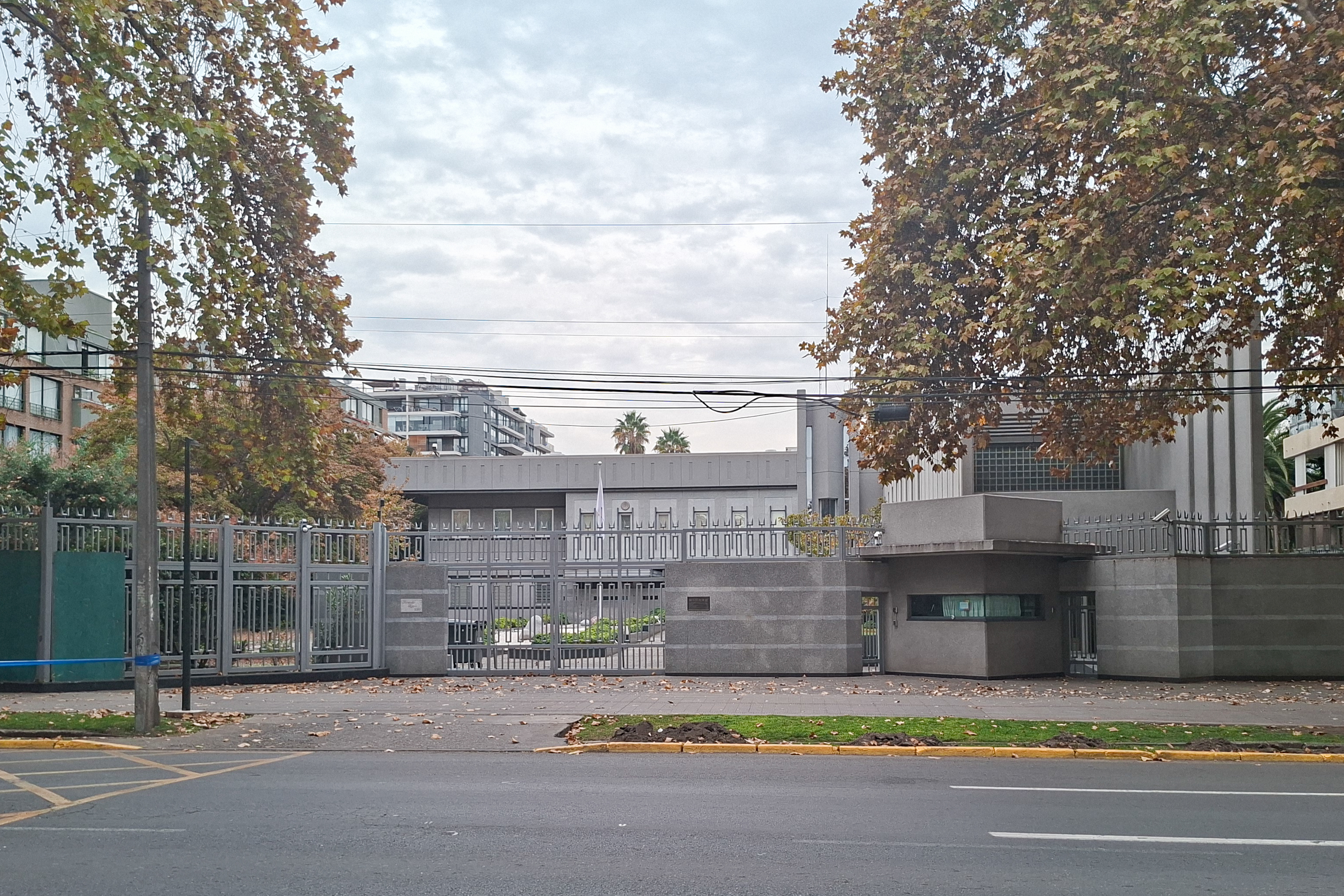
Embassy of Japan in Santiago

== See also ==
- Japanese Chileans
