= List of ambassadors of Japan to Belgium =

The List of Japanese ambassadors to Belgium started when Motono Ichirō presented his credentials to the Belgian government in 1898.

== List ==
This is a chronological list of Japanese diplomats.

Inaugural date	Official position (Japanese)	Official position	Name (Japanese)	Name
December 5, 1898	特命全権公使	Minister Plenipotentiary	本野 一郎	Motono Ichirō
October 5, 1901	臨時代理公使	Chargé d'affaires ad interim	松方 正作	Matsukata Shosaku
July 4, 1902	特命全権公使	Minister Plenipotentiary	加藤 恒忠	Katō Tsunetada
October 27, 1906	臨時代理公使	Chargé d'affaires ad interim	大鳥 富士太郎	Ōtori Fujitarō
June 14, 1907	特命全権公使	Minister Plenipotentiary	秋月 左都夫	Akizuki Satsuo
September 5, 1909	臨時代理公使	Chargé d'affaires ad interim	松田 道一	Matsuda Michikazu
April 1, 1910	特命全権公使	Minister Plenipotentiary	鍋島 桂次郎	Nabeshima Keijirō
December 21, 1913	臨時代理公使	Chargé d'affaires ad interim	諸井 六郎	Moroi Rokurō
April 27, 1914	臨時代理公使	Chargé d'affaires ad interim	山中 千之	Yamanaka Chiyuki
October 24, 1917	特命全権公使	Minister Plenipotentiary	安達 峰一郎	Adachi Mineichirō
May 31, 1921	特命全権大使	Ambassador	安達 峰一郎	Adachi Mineichirō
February 13, 1928	臨時代理大使	Chargé d'affaires ad interim	栗原 正	Kurihara Tadashi
August 23, 1928	特命全権大使	Ambassador	永井 松三	Nagai Matsuzo
November 17, 1930	臨時代理大使	Chargé d'affaires ad interim	芦田 均	Ashida Hitoshi
March 16, 1931	特命全権大使	Ambassador	佐藤 尚武	Satō Naotake
December 20, 1933	臨時代理大使	Chargé d'affaires ad interim	大鷹 正次郎	Ōtaka Shōjirō
February 19, 1934	特命全権大使	Ambassador	有田 八郎	Arita Hachirō
December 4, 1935	臨時代理大使	Chargé d'affaires ad interim	大森 元一郎	Omori Genichirō
June 24, 1936	特命全権大使	Ambassador	来栖 三郎	Kurusu Saburō
December 2, 1939	臨時代理大使	Chargé d'affaires ad interim	小林 亀久雄	Kobayashi Kikuo
December 9, 1939	特命全権大使	Ambassador	栗山 茂	Kuriyama Shigeru
May 3, 1940	臨時代理大使	Chargé d'affaires ad interim	小林 亀久雄	Kobayashi Kikuo
June 22, 1943	Second World War			
February 22, 1951	在ブリュッセル在外事務所長	Chief of the Japanese Government's Overseas Agency in Brussels	与謝野 秀	Yosano Shigeru
April 28, 1952	臨時代理大使	Chargé d'affaires ad interim	与謝野 秀	Yosano Shigeru
August 25, 1952	特命全権大使	Ambassador	荒川 昌二	Arakawa Shōji
February 14, 1955	臨時代理大使	Chargé d'affaires ad interim	山津 善衛	Yamatsu Yoshie
April 8, 1955	特命全権大使	Ambassador	武内 龍次	Takeuchi Ryūji
April 8, 1957	臨時代理大使	Chargé d'affaires ad interim	矢野 泰男	Yano Yasuo
July 24, 1957	特命全権大使	Ambassador	倭島 英二	Wajima Eiji
December 8, 1960	臨時代理大使	Chargé d'affaires ad interim	中山 賀博	Nakayama Yoshirō
January 16, 1961	特命全権大使	Ambassador	下田 武三	Shimoda Takeso
November 29, 1963	臨時代理大使	Chargé d'affaires ad interim	井川 克一	Ikawa Katsuichi
December 10, 1963	特命全権大使	Ambassador	湯川 盛夫	Yukawa Morio
May 5, 1968	臨時代理大使	Chargé d'affaires ad interim	平原 毅	Hirahara Tsuyoshi
November 6, 1968	特命全権大使	Ambassador	小田部 謙一	Otabe Kenichi
January 27, 1971	臨時代理大使	Chargé d'affaires ad interim	安田 謙治	Yasuda Kenji
February 23, 1971	特命全権大使	Ambassador	安倍 勲	Abe Isao
February 6, 1976	臨時代理大使	Chargé d'affaires ad interim	大鷹 弘	Ōtaka Hiroshi
March 12, 1976	特命全権大使	Ambassador	西堀 正弘	Nishibori Masahiro
January 12, 1979	臨時代理大使	Chargé d'affaires ad interim	西崎 信郎	Nishizaki Nobuo
March 25, 1979	特命全権大使	Ambassador	徳久 茂	Tokuhisa Shigeru
May 19, 1983	臨時代理大使	Chargé d'affaires ad interim	平林 博	Hirabayashi Hiroshi
June 3, 1983	特命全権大使	Ambassador	山本 鎮彦	Yamamoto Shizuhiko
March 15, 1987	臨時代理大使	Chargé d'affaires ad interim	河村 武和	Kawamura Takekazu
March 26, 1987	特命全権大使	Ambassador	加藤 吉彌	Katō Yoshiya
February 17, 1990	臨時代理大使	Chargé d'affaires ad interim	大久保 基	Ōkubo Motoi
March 1, 1990	特命全権大使	Ambassador	矢田部 厚彦	Yatabe Atsuhiko

== See also ==
- Belgium–Japan relations
- Diplomatic rank
