= List of ambassadors of Japan to Panama =

The List of Japanese ambassadors to Panama started when Koshida Saichirō presented his credentials to the Panamanian government in 1938.

== List ==
This is a chronological list of Japanese diplomats.

Inaugural date	Official position (Japanese)	Official position	Name (Japanese)	Name
June 1, 1938	特命全権公使	Minister Plenipotentiary	越田 佐一郎	Koshida Saichirō
July 12, 1939	臨時代理公使	Chargé d'affaires ad interim	大谷 弥七	Ōtani Yashichi
October 14, 1939	特命全権公使	Minister Plenipotentiary	水沢 孝策	Mizuzawa Kōsaku
September 19, 1940	臨時代理公使	Chargé d'affaires ad interim	長嶺 直哉	Nagamine Naoya
March 20, 1941	臨時代理公使	Chargé d'affaires ad interim	井沢 実	Izawa Minoru
August 15, 1941	特命全権公使	Minister Plenipotentiary	秋山 理敏	Akiyama Masatoshi
January 12, 1942	Second World War			
February 8, 1958	特命全権公使	Minister Plenipotentiary	二宮 謙	Ninomiya Ken
June 16, 1960	臨時代理公使	Chargé d'affaires ad interim	吉崎 芳太郎	Yoshizaki Yoshitarō
September 21, 1960	特命全権公使	Minister Plenipotentiary	三宅 喜二郎	Miyake Kijirō
October 14, 1961	臨時代理公使	Chargé d'affaires ad interim	石田 久恒	Ishida Hisatsune
December 3, 1961	特命全権公使	Minister Plenipotentiary	丸山 佶	Maruyama Tadashi
October 1, 1962	特命全権大使	Ambassador	丸山 佶	Maruyama Tadashi
October 17, 1963	臨時代理大使	Chargé d'affaires ad interim	石田 久恒	Ishida Hisatsune
April 3, 1964	特命全権大使	Ambassador	田中 弘人	Tanaka Hiroto
October 21, 1966	臨時代理大使	Chargé d'affaires ad interim	鮫島 勝彦	Sameshima Katsuhiko
January 10, 1967	特命全権大使	Ambassador	高橋 明	Takahashi Akira
December 2, 1969	臨時代理大使	Chargé d'affaires ad interim	鮫島 勝彦	Sameshima Katsuhiko
December 7, 1969	特命全権大使	Ambassador	今井 実	Imai Minoru
November 7, 1972	臨時代理大使	Chargé d'affaires ad interim	鮫島 勝彦	Sameshima Katsuhiko
August 2, 1973	特命全権大使	Ambassador	片上 一郎	Katakami Ichirō
May 18, 1976	臨時代理大使	Chargé d'affaires ad interim	加藤 静也	Katō Shizuya
August 25, 1976	特命全権大使	Ambassador	山口 広次	Yamaguchi Hiroji
April 14, 1979	臨時代理大使	Chargé d'affaires ad interim	須山 章	Suyama Akira
November 25, 1979	特命全権大使	Ambassador	石井 亨	Ishii Tōru
March 4, 1982	臨時代理大使	Chargé d'affaires ad interim	柴田 進	Shibata Susumu
March 31, 1982	特命全権大使	Ambassador	茂木 良三	Mogi Ryōzō
August 1, 1986	臨時代理大使	Chargé d'affaires ad interim	佐藤 秀雄	Satō Hideo
October 2, 1986	特命全権大使	Ambassador	沢井 昭之	Sawai Akiyuki
March 2, 1989	臨時代理大使	Chargé d'affaires ad interim	木本 博之	Kimoto Hiroyuki
April 14, 1989	特命全権大使	Ambassador	加藤 淳平	Katō Junpei

== See also ==
- Diplomatic rank
