= List of ambassadors of Japan to Mexico =

The List of Japanese ambassadors to Mexico started when Murota Yoshifumi presented his credentials to the Mexican government in 1897.

== List ==
This is a chronological list of Japanese diplomats.

Inaugural date	Official position (Japanese)	Official position	Name (Japanese)	Name
March 31, 1897	弁理公使	Minister resident	室田 義文	Murota Yoshifumi
May 12, 1900	臨時代理公使	Chargé d'affaires ad interim	亀山 松次郎	Kameyama Matsujirō
December 5, 1900	弁理公使	Minister resident	佐藤 愛麿	Satō Aimaro
June 20, 1902	臨時代理公使	Chargé d'affaires ad interim	信夫 淳平	Shinobu Junpei
June 10, 1903	弁理公使	Minister resident	杉村 虎一	Sugimura Kōichi
October 8, 1903	特命全権公使	Minister Plenipotentiary	杉村 虎一	Sugimura Kōichi
June 22, 1906	臨時代理公使	Chargé d'affaires ad interim	矢田 長之助	Yada Chōnosuke
November 13, 1906	特命全権公使	Minister Plenipotentiary	荒川 巳次	Arakawa Minoji
October 12, 1907	臨時代理公使	Chargé d'affaires ad interim	矢田 長之助	Yada Chōnosuke
December 10, 1907	臨時代理公使	Chargé d'affaires ad interim	吉田 美利	Yoshida Yoshitoshi
October 5, 1909	臨時代理公使	Chargé d'affaires ad interim	堀口 九萬一	Horiguchi Kumaichi
March 23, 1913	臨時代理公使	Chargé d'affaires ad interim	田辺 熊三郎	Tanabe Kumasaburō
July 21, 1913	特命全権公使	Minister Plenipotentiary	安達 峰一郎	Adachi Mineichirō
August 30, 1915	臨時代理公使	Chargé d'affaires ad interim	岩崎 三雄	Iwasaki Misao
April 12, 1916	臨時代理公使	Chargé d'affaires ad interim	太田 為吉	Ōta Tamekichi
December 31, 1917	特命全権公使	Minister Plenipotentiary	大鳥 富士太郎	Ōtori Fujitarō
July 8, 1919	臨時代理公使	Chargé d'affaires ad interim	伊藤 敬一	Itō Keiichi
November 6, 1922	特命全権公使	Minister Plenipotentiary	古谷 重綱	Furuya Shigetsuna
January 30, 1926	臨時代理公使	Chargé d'affaires ad interim	越田 佐一郎	Koshida Saichirō
January 7, 1927	特命全権公使	Minister Plenipotentiary	青木 新	Aoki Arata
September 11, 1930	臨時代理公使	Chargé d'affaires ad interim	柳沢 健	Yanazawa Ken
September 19, 1931	特命全権公使	Minister Plenipotentiary	堀義 貴	Hori Yoshimatsu
April 20, 1936	臨時代理大使	Chargé d'affaires ad interim	井沢 実	Izawa Minoru
February 4, 1937	特命全権公使	Minister Plenipotentiary	越田 佐一郎	Koshida Saichirō
October 14, 1940	臨時代理公使	Chargé d'affaires ad interim	佐藤 舜	Satō Shun
November 14, 1940	特命全権公使	Minister Plenipotentiary	三浦 義秋	Miura Yoshiaki
March 13, 1942	Second World War			
April 28, 1952	臨時代理大使	Chargé d'affaires ad interim	千葉 皓	Chiba Kō
November 18, 1952	特命全権大使	Ambassador	加瀬 俊一	Kase Shunichi
December 14, 1953	臨時代理大使	Chargé d'affaires ad interim	千葉 皓	Chiba Kō
January 13, 1954	特命全権大使	Ambassador	久保田 貫一郎	Kubota Kanichirō
November 16, 1957	臨時代理大使	Chargé d'affaires ad interim	光藤 俊雄	Mitsudo Toshio
January 29, 1958	特命全権大使	Ambassador	千葉 皓	Chiba Kō
August 27, 1960	臨時代理大使	Chargé d'affaires ad interim	山中 俊夫	Yamanaka Toshio
September 1, 1960	特命全権大使	Ambassador	林 馨	Hayashi Kaoru
August 27, 1965	臨時代理大使	Chargé d'affaires ad interim	中根 正己	Nakane Masami
September 29, 1965	特命全権大使	Ambassador	石黒 四郎	Ishiguro Shirō
July 25, 1968	臨時代理大使	Chargé d'affaires ad interim	大口 信夫	Ōguchi Nobuo
August 29, 1968	特命全権大使	Ambassador	関 守三郎	Seki Morisaburō
June 25, 1970	臨時代理大使	Chargé d'affaires ad interim	林 祐一	Hayashi Yuichi
October 21, 1970	特命全権大使	Ambassador	加藤 匡夫	Katō Tadao
May 15, 1974	臨時代理大使	Chargé d'affaires ad interim	林屋 永吉	Hayashiya Eikichi
July 16, 1974	特命全権大使	Ambassador	鈴木 孝	Suzuki Takashi
February 21, 1976	臨時代理大使	Chargé d'affaires ad interim	石川 賢治	Ishikawa Kenji
April 16, 1976	特命全権大使	Ambassador	和田 力	Wada Tsutomu
February 18, 1978	臨時代理大使	Chargé d'affaires ad interim	大島 弘輔	Ōshima Hirosuke
May 8, 1978	特命全権大使	Ambassador	松永 信雄	Matsunaga Nobuo
December 19, 1981	臨時代理大使	Chargé d'affaires ad interim	中曽根 悟郎	Nakasone Gorō
December 28, 1981	特命全権大使	Ambassador	菊地 清明	Kikuchi Kiyoaki
November 8, 1984	臨時代理大使	Chargé d'affaires ad interim	杉山 洋二	Sugiyama Yōji
December 19, 1984	特命全権大使	Ambassador	内藤 武	Naito Takeshi
January 7, 1988	臨時代理大使	Chargé d'affaires ad interim	甲斐 紀武	Kai Noritake
January 27, 1988	特命全権大使	Ambassador	今井 隆吉	Imai Ryukichi
September 25, 1990	臨時代理大使	Chargé d'affaires ad interim	浅見 眞	Asami Makoto
November 15, 1990	特命全権大使	Ambassador	田中 常雄	Tanaka Tsuneo

== See also ==
- Japan–Mexico relations
- Diplomatic rank
