= Masahide Kanayama =

Japanese diplomat

Augustine Masahide Kanayama (金山 政英, Kanayama Masahide; 1909 – November 1997) was a Japanese diplomat.

== Diplomatic career ==
Kanayama worked under Ambassador Ken Harada at the Vatican in 1942-1945. In his position at the Vatican, he tried to obtain an early Japanese surrender in World War II in the spring of 1945 (which would have avoided the atomic bombings of Hiroshima and Nagasaki) by requesting Papal mediation between the US and Japanese governments.

After World War II, he succeeded Harada as Minister Chargé d'Affairs at the Vatican, remaining there until 1952. His next overseas post was as counsellor at the Embassy in the Philippines. This was followed by three years as Consul-General in Hawaii from 1954 to 1957. Afterwards, he was appointed for four years as director general of the European Oceanic Bureau at the Foreign Office. From 1961 to 1963, he was Consul General in New York, where he was also President of the Society of Foreign Consules in 1962 and 1963. In the years from 1963 to 1972, he was successively Japanese Ambassador to Chile, Poland and South Korea. He retired in 1972, but remained active in several international research and cultural organizations.

Nine months after his death in 1997, he was buried in a Catholic cemetery near Seoul.
