= Second Ikeda cabinet =

Cabinet of Japan (1960–1963)

Second Ikeda Cabinet
- 59th Cabinet of Japan

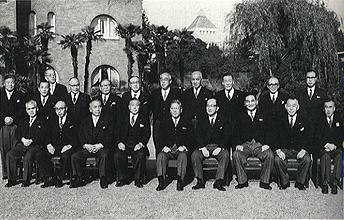
- Initial composition
- Date formed: December 8, 1960
- Date dissolved: December 9, 1963

People and organisations
- Emperor: Shōwa
- Prime Minister: Hayato Ikeda
- Member party: Liberal Democratic Party
- Status in legislature: House of Representatives: Majority; House of Councillors: Majority
- Opposition parties: Japan Socialist Party; Democratic Socialist Party; Japanese Communist Party; Dōshikai; Kōmeitō

History
- Elections: 1960 general election 1962 councillors election
- Legislature term: 37th-45th National Diet
- Predecessor: First Ikeda Cabinet
- Successor: Third Ikeda Cabinet

The Second Ikeda Cabinet was the 59th Cabinet of Japan. It was headed by Hayato Ikeda from December 8, 1960, to December 9, 1963.

== Cabinet ==
Portfolio	Name	Political party	Term start	Term end
Prime Minister	Hayato Ikeda	Liberal Democratic	December 8, 1960	December 9, 1963
Minister of Justice	Koshiro Ueki	Liberal Democratic	December 8, 1960	July 18, 1962
Minister for Foreign Affairs	Zentarō Kosaka	Liberal Democratic	December 8, 1960	July 18, 1962
Minister of Finance	Mikio Mizuta	Liberal Democratic	December 8, 1960	July 18, 1962
Minister of Education	Masuo Araki	Liberal Democratic	December 8, 1960	July 18, 1963
Minister of Health	Yoshimi Furui	Liberal Democratic	December 8, 1960	July 18, 1961
Minister of Agriculture, Forestry and Fisheries	Hideo Sutō	Liberal Democratic	December 8, 1960	July 18, 1961
Minister of International Trade and Industry	Etsusaburo Shiina	Liberal Democratic	December 8, 1960	July 18, 1961
Minister of Transport	Budayu Kogure	Liberal Democratic	December 8, 1960	July 18, 1961
Minister of Posts	Yoshiteru Kogane	Liberal Democratic	December 8, 1960	July 18, 1961
Minister of Labor	Hirohide Ishida	Liberal Democratic	December 8, 1960	July 18, 1961
Minister of Construction Chair of the National Capital Region Development Commission	Umekichi Nakamura	Liberal Democratic	December 8, 1960	July 18, 1962
Minister of Home Affairs Chair of the National Public Safety Commission	Ken Yasui	Liberal Democratic	December 8, 1960	July 18, 1962
Director of the Administrative Management Agency Director of the Hokkaido Regional Development Agency	Ozawa Saeki	Liberal Democratic	December 8, 1960	July 18, 1961
Director of the Defense Agency	Naomi Nishimura	Liberal Democratic	December 8, 1960	July 18, 1961
Director of the Economic Planning Agency	Hisatsune Sakomizu	Liberal Democratic	December 8, 1960	July 18, 1961
Director of the Science and Technology Agency	Masanosuke Ikeda	Liberal Democratic	December 8, 1960	July 18, 1961
Chief Cabinet Secretary	Masayoshi Ōhira	Liberal Democratic	December 8, 1960	July 18, 1962
Director-General of the Prime Minister's Office	Sensuke Fujieda	Liberal Democratic	December 8, 1960	July 18, 1961
Director-General of the Cabinet Legislation Bureau	Shūzō Hayashi	Independent	December 8, 1960	December 9, 1963
Deputy Chief Cabinet Secretary (Political Affairs)	Takehisa Yasuoka	Liberal Democratic	December 8, 1960	July 25, 1961
Deputy Chief Cabinet Secretary (General Affairs)	Kiichi Hosoya	Independent	December 8, 1960	December 9, 1963
Deputy Director-General of the Prime Minister's Office	Asao Satō	Independent	December 8, 1960	May 7, 1962

== First cabinet reshuffle ==
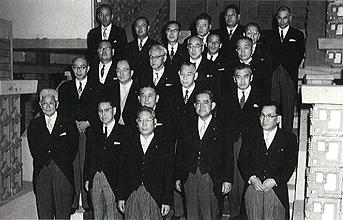
First cabinet reshuffle

The first cabinet reshuffle took place on July 18, 1961.

Portfolio	Name	Political party	Term start	Term end
Prime Minister	Hayato Ikeda	Liberal Democratic	December 8, 1960	December 9, 1963
Minister of Justice	Koshiro Ueki	Liberal Democratic	December 8, 1960	July 18, 1962
Minister for Foreign Affairs	Zentarō Kosaka	Liberal Democratic	December 8, 1960	July 18, 1962
Minister of Finance	Mikio Mizuta	Liberal Democratic	December 8, 1960	July 18, 1962
Minister of Education	Masuo Araki	Liberal Democratic	December 8, 1960	July 18, 1963
Minister of Health	Hirokichi Nadao	Liberal Democratic	July 18, 1961	July 18, 1962
Minister of Agriculture, Forestry and Fisheries	Ichirō Kōno	Liberal Democratic	July 18, 1961	July 18, 1962
Minister of International Trade and Industry	Eisaku Satō	Liberal Democratic	July 18, 1961	July 18, 1962
Minister of Transport	Noboru Saitō	Liberal Democratic	July 18, 1961	July 18, 1962
Minister of Posts	Hisatsune Sakomizu	Liberal Democratic	July 18, 1961	July 18, 1962
Minister of Labor	Kenji Fukunaga	Liberal Democratic	July 18, 1961	July 18, 1962
Minister of Construction Chair of the National Capital Region Development Commission	Umekichi Nakamura	Liberal Democratic	December 8, 1960	July 18, 1962
Minister of Home Affairs Chair of the National Public Safety Commission	Ken Yasui	Liberal Democratic	December 8, 1960	July 18, 1962
Director of the Administrative Management Agency Director of the Hokkaido Regional Development Agency	Shōjirō Kawashima	Liberal Democratic	July 18, 1961	July 18, 1963
Director of the Defense Agency	Sensuke Fujieda	Liberal Democratic	July 18, 1961	July 18, 1962
Director of the Economic Planning Agency	Aiichirō Fujiyama	Liberal Democratic	July 18, 1961	July 5, 1962
Director of the Economic Planning Agency	Hayato Ikeda (acting)	Liberal Democratic	July 6, 1962	July 18, 1962
Director of the Science and Technology Agency	Takeo Miki	Liberal Democratic	July 18, 1961	July 18, 1962
Chief Cabinet Secretary	Masayoshi Ōhira	Liberal Democratic	December 8, 1960	July 18, 1962
Director-General of the Prime Minister's Office	Hisao Kodaira	Liberal Democratic	July 18, 1961	July 18, 1962
Director-General of the Cabinet Legislation Bureau	Shūzō Hayashi	Independent	December 8, 1960	December 9, 1963
Deputy Chief Cabinet Secretary (Political Affairs)	Yasushi Hattori	Liberal Democratic	July 25, 1961	July 27, 1962
Deputy Chief Cabinet Secretary (General Affairs)	Kiichi Hosoya	Independent	December 8, 1960	December 9, 1963
Deputy Director-General of the Prime Minister's Office	Asao Satō	Independent	December 8, 1960	May 7, 1962
Deputy Director-General of the Prime Minister's Office	Tōru Furuya	Liberal Democratic	May 7, 1962	December 9, 1963

== Second cabinet reshuffle ==
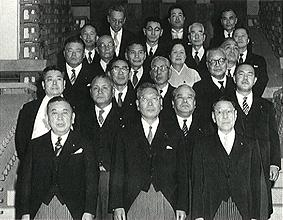
Second cabinet reshuffle

The second cabinet reshuffle took place on July 18, 1962.

Portfolio	Name	Political party	Term start	Term end
Prime Minister	Hayato Ikeda	Liberal Democratic	December 8, 1960	December 9, 1963
Minister of Justice	Kunio Nakagaki	Liberal Democratic	July 18, 1962	July 18, 1963
Minister for Foreign Affairs	Masayoshi Ōhira	Liberal Democratic	July 18, 1962	December 9, 1963
Minister of Finance	Kakuei Tanaka	Liberal Democratic	July 18, 1962	December 9, 1963
Minister of Education	Masuo Araki	Liberal Democratic	December 8, 1960	July 18, 1963
Minister of Health	Eiichi Nishimura	Liberal Democratic	July 18, 1962	July 18, 1963
Minister of Agriculture, Forestry and Fisheries	Seishi Shigemasa	Liberal Democratic	July 18, 1962	July 18, 1963
Minister of International Trade and Industry	Hajime Fukuda	Liberal Democratic	July 18, 1962	December 9, 1963
Minister of Transport	Kentarō Ayabe	Liberal Democratic	July 18, 1962	December 9, 1963
Minister of Posts	Sakae Teshima	Liberal Democratic	July 18, 1962	January 8, 1963
Minister of Posts	Kyutarō Ozawa	Liberal Democratic	January 8, 1963	July 18, 1963
Minister of Labor	Takeo Ōhashi	Liberal Democratic	July 18, 1962	December 9, 1963
Minister of Construction	Ichirō Kōno	Liberal Democratic	July 18, 1962	December 9, 1963
Chair of the National Capital Region Development Commission	Shōjirō Kawashima	Liberal Democratic	July 18, 1962	November 2, 1962
Chair of the National Capital Region Development Commission	Ichirō Kōno	Liberal Democratic	November 2, 1962	December 9, 1963
Director of the Kinki Regional Development Agency	Ichirō Kōno	Liberal Democratic	July 10, 1963	December 9, 1963
Minister of Home Affairs Chair of the National Public Safety Commission	Kōsaku Shinoda	Liberal Democratic	July 18, 1962	July 18, 1963
Director of the Administrative Management Agency Director of the Hokkaido Regional Development Agency	Shōjirō Kawashima	Liberal Democratic	July 18, 1961	July 18, 1963
Director of the Defense Agency	Kenjirō Shiga	Liberal Democratic	July 18, 1962	July 18, 1963
Director of the Economic Planning Agency	Kiichi Miyazawa	Liberal Democratic	July 18, 1962	December 9, 1963
Director of the Science and Technology Agency	Tsuruyo Kondo	Liberal Democratic	July 18, 1962	July 18, 1963
Chief Cabinet Secretary	Yasumi Kurogane	Liberal Democratic	July 18, 1962	December 9, 1963
Director-General of the Prime Minister's Office	Jitsuzō Tokuyasu	Liberal Democratic	July 18, 1962	July 18, 1963
Director-General of the Cabinet Legislation Bureau	Shūzō Hayashi	Independent	December 8, 1960	December 9, 1963
Deputy Chief Cabinet Secretary (Political Affairs)	Sadayoshi Hatta	Liberal Democratic	July 27, 1962	July 18, 1963
Deputy Chief Cabinet Secretary (General Affairs)	Kiichi Hosoya	Independent	December 8, 1960	December 9, 1963
Deputy Director-General of the Prime Minister's Office	Tōru Furuya	Liberal Democratic	May 7, 1962	December 9, 1963

== Third cabinet reshuffle ==
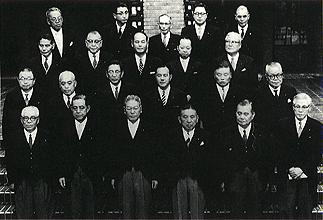
Third cabinet reshuffle

The third cabinet reshuffle took place on July 18, 1963.

Portfolio	Name	Political party	Term start	Term end
Prime Minister	Hayato Ikeda	Liberal Democratic	December 8, 1960	December 9, 1963
Minister of Justice	Okinori Kaya	Liberal Democratic	July 18, 1963	December 9, 1963
Minister for Foreign Affairs	Masayoshi Ōhira	Liberal Democratic	July 18, 1962	December 9, 1963
Minister of Finance	Kakuei Tanaka	Liberal Democratic	July 18, 1962	December 9, 1963
Minister of Education	Hirokichi Nadao	Liberal Democratic	July 18, 1963	December 9, 1963
Minister of Health	Takeji Kobayashi	Liberal Democratic	July 18, 1963	December 9, 1963
Minister of Agriculture, Forestry and Fisheries	Munenori Akagi	Liberal Democratic	July 18, 1963	December 9, 1963
Minister of International Trade and Industry	Hajime Fukuda	Liberal Democratic	July 18, 1962	December 9, 1963
Minister of Transport	Kentarō Ayabe	Liberal Democratic	July 18, 1962	December 9, 1963
Minister of Posts	Shinzō Koike	Liberal Democratic	July 18, 1963	December 9, 1963
Minister of Labor	Takeo Ōhashi	Liberal Democratic	July 18, 1962	December 9, 1963
Minister of Construction	Ichirō Kōno	Liberal Democratic	July 18, 1962	December 9, 1963
Chair of the National Capital Region Development Commission	Ichirō Kōno	Liberal Democratic	November 2, 1962	December 9, 1963
Director of the Kinki Regional Development Agency	Ichirō Kōno	Liberal Democratic	July 10, 1963	December 9, 1963
Minister of Home Affairs Chair of the National Public Safety Commission	Takashi Hayakawa	Liberal Democratic	July 18, 1963	December 9, 1963
Director of the Administrative Management Agency	Shinjirō Yamamura	Liberal Democratic	July 18, 1963	December 9, 1963
Director of the Hokkaido Regional Development Agency Director of the Science and Technology Agency	Eisaku Satō	Liberal Democratic	July 18, 1963	December 9, 1963
Director of the Defense Agency	Tokuyasu Fukuda	Liberal Democratic	July 18, 1963	December 9, 1963
Director of the Economic Planning Agency	Kiichi Miyazawa	Liberal Democratic	July 18, 1962	December 9, 1963
Chief Cabinet Secretary	Yasumi Kurogane	Liberal Democratic	July 18, 1962	December 9, 1963
Director-General of the Prime Minister's Office	Takeo Noda	Liberal Democratic	July 18, 1963	December 9, 1963
Director-General of the Cabinet Legislation Bureau	Shūzō Hayashi	Independent	December 8, 1960	December 9, 1963
Deputy Chief Cabinet Secretary (Political Affairs)	Ichirōbei Kusano	Liberal Democratic	July 30, 1963	December 9, 1963
Deputy Chief Cabinet Secretary (General Affairs)	Kiichi Hosoya	Independent	December 8, 1960	December 9, 1963
Deputy Director-General of the Prime Minister's Office	Tōru Furuya	Liberal Democratic	May 7, 1962	December 9, 1963
