= Ikeda Cabinet =

Ikeda Cabinet may refer to:

- First Ikeda Cabinet, the Japanese majority government led by Hayato Ikeda in 1960
- Second Ikeda Cabinet, the Japanese majority government led by Hayato Ikeda from 1960 to 1963
- Third Ikeda Cabinet, the Japanese majority government led by Hayato Ikeda from 1963 to 1964
