= First Ikeda cabinet =

Cabinet of Japan (July - December 1960)

First Ikeda Cabinet
- 58th Cabinet of Japan

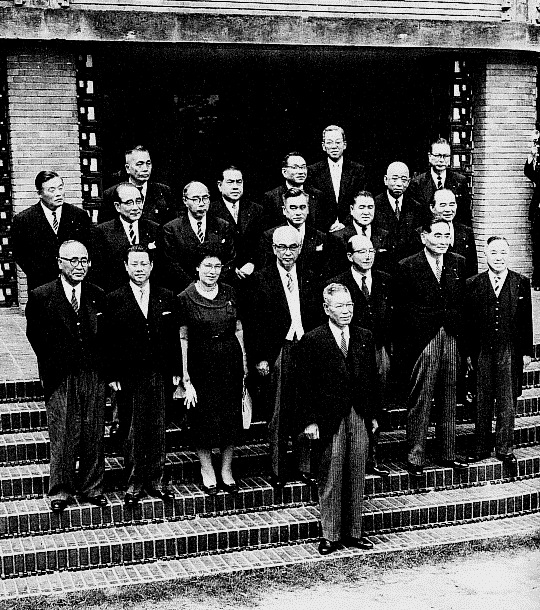
- Date formed: July 19, 1960
- Date dissolved: December 8, 1960

People and organisations
- Emperor: Shōwa
- Prime Minister: Hayato Ikeda
- Member party: Liberal Democratic Party
- Status in legislature: House of Representatives: Majority; House of Councillors: Majority
- Opposition parties: Japan Socialist Party; Japanese Communist Party; Ryokufūkai

History
- Legislature term: 35th-37th National Diet
- Predecessor: Second Kishi Cabinet
- Successor: Second Ikeda Cabinet

The First Ikeda Cabinet is the 58th Cabinet of Japan headed by Hayato Ikeda from July 19 to December 8, 1960.

== Cabinet ==
Portfolio	Name	Political party	Term start	Term end
Prime Minister	Hayato Ikeda	Liberal Democratic	July 19, 1960	December 8, 1960
Minister of Justice	Tetsuzo Kojima	Liberal Democratic	July 19, 1960	December 8, 1960
Minister for Foreign Affairs	Zentarō Kosaka	Liberal Democratic	July 19, 1960	December 8, 1960
Minister of Finance	Mikio Mizuta	Liberal Democratic	July 19, 1960	December 8, 1960
Minister of Education Director of the Science and Technology Agency	Masuo Araki	Liberal Democratic	July 19, 1960	December 8, 1960
Minister of Health	Masa Nakayama	Liberal Democratic	July 19, 1960	December 8, 1960
Minister of Agriculture, Forestry and Fisheries	Tokuo Nanjō	Liberal Democratic	July 19, 1960	December 8, 1960
Minister of International Trade and Industry	Mitsujirō Ishii	Liberal Democratic	July 19, 1960	December 8, 1960
Minister of Transport	Yoshio Minami	Liberal Democratic	July 19, 1960	December 8, 1960
Minister of Posts	Zenkō Suzuki	Liberal Democratic	July 19, 1960	December 8, 1960
Minister of Labor	Hirohide Ishida	Liberal Democratic	July 19, 1960	December 8, 1960
Minister of Construction; Chairman of the National Capital Development Commission	Tomisaburō Hashimoto	Liberal Democratic	July 19, 1960	December 8, 1960
Minister of Home Affairs; Chairman of the National Public Safety Commission	Iwao Yamazaki	Liberal Democratic	July 19, 1960	October 13, 1960
Minister of Home Affairs; Chairman of the National Public Safety Commission	Hideo Sutō	Liberal Democratic	October 13, 1960	December 8, 1960
Director of the Administrative Management Agency	Shintarō Takahashi	Liberal Democratic	July 19, 1960	December 8, 1960
Director of the Hokkaido Regional Development Agency	Jingorō Nishikawa	Liberal Democratic	July 19, 1960	December 8, 1960
Director of the Defense Agency	Masumi Esaki	Liberal Democratic	July 19, 1960	December 8, 1960
Director of the Economic Planning Agency	Hisatsune Sakomizu	Liberal Democratic	July 19, 1960	December 8, 1960
Chief Cabinet Secretary	Masayoshi Ōhira	Liberal Democratic	July 19, 1960	December 8, 1960
Director-General of the Prime Minister's Office	Sensuke Fujieda	Liberal Democratic	July 19, 1960	December 8, 1960
Director-General of the Cabinet Legislation Bureau	Shūzō Hayashi	Independent	July 19, 1960	December 8, 1960
Deputy Chief Cabinet Secretary (Political Affairs)	Morio Sasaki	Liberal Democratic	July 22, 1960	December 8, 1960
Deputy Chief Cabinet Secretary (General Affairs)	Heiji Ogawa	Liberal Democratic	July 22, 1960	December 8, 1960
Deputy Director-General of the Prime Minister's Office	Asao Satō	Independent	July 19, 1960	December 8, 1960
