= Shigesaburō Maeo =

Japanese politician (1905-1981)

- 前尾 繁三郎
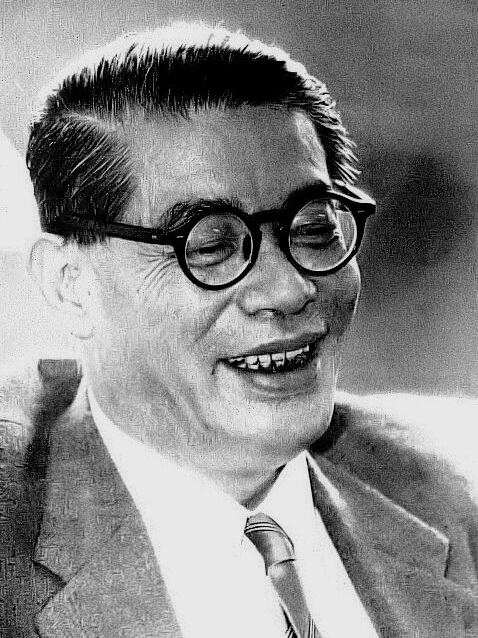
- Maeo in 1961

Speaker of the House of Representatives
- In office 29 May 1973 – 9 December 1976
- Monarch: Hirohito
- Deputy: Daisuke Akita
- Preceded by: Umekichi Nakamura
- Succeeded by: Shigeru Hori
Ministerial offices
Minister of Justice
In office 5 July 1971 – 7 July 1972
Prime Minister	Eisaku Satō
Preceded by	Koshiro Ueki
Succeeded by	Yūichi Kōri
Director-General of the Hokkaido Development Agency
In office 1 August 1966 – 3 December 1966
Prime Minister	Eisaku Satō
Preceded by	Fukuda Tokuyasu
Succeeded by	Susumu Nikaidō
Minister of International Trade and Industry
In office 10 July 1957 – 12 June 1958
Prime Minister	Nobusuke Kishi
Preceded by	Mikio Mizuta
Succeeded by	Tatsunosuke Takasaki
Party political offices
Secretary-General of the Liberal Democratic Party
In office July 1961 – July 1964
President	Hayato Ikeda
Vice President	Banboku Ōno
Preceded by	Shūji Masutani
Succeeded by	Takeo Miki

Member of the House of Representatives
- In office 22 June 1980 – 23 July 1981
- Preceded by: Yoshiharu Yamada
- Succeeded by: Hiromu Nonaka
- Constituency: Kyoto 2nd
- In office 24 January 1949 – 7 September 1979
- Preceded by: Okumura Takezō
- Succeeded by: Yoshiharu Yamada
- Constituency: Kyoto 2nd

Personal details
- Born: 10 December 1905 Miyazu, Kyoto, Japan
- Died: 23 July 1981 (aged 75) Kyoto, Japan
- Party: Liberal Democratic
- Other political affiliations: DLP (1948–1950); LP (1950–1955)
- Education: Tokyo Imperial University

Shigesuburō Maeo (前尾 繁三郎, Maeo Shigesaburō; 10 December 1905 – 23 July 1981) was a Japanese bureaucrat and politician who served as Secretary-General of the Liberal Democratic Party from 1961 to 1964, and was the 58th Speaker of the House of Representatives in the National Diet from 1973 to 1976.

In addition, Maeo was a member of prime minister Hayato Ikeda's "brain trust" in 1960 that helped formulate the Income Doubling Plan. After Ikeda died in 1965, Maeo served as the second head of the Kōchikai political faction within the Liberal Democratic Party, a post he held until 1971.

== Early life and education ==
Shigesaburō Maeo was born into poverty in the seaside town of Miyazu in Kyoto Prefecture in 1905. His father ran a pottery business, and his mother had no formal education. An avid reader, Maeo did well in school. Maeo's family could not afford to send him to middle school, but luckily a local doctor stepped in and paid his tuition. In his final year of middle school, Maeo passed the extremely difficult examination to enter the First High School in Tokyo. First High School was the most prestigious high school in Japan, and gaining entry virtually guaranteed acceptance to Tokyo Imperial University. After graduating from Tokyo Imperial University in 1929, Maeo entered the Ministry of Finance, where he became close friends with fellow bureaucrat Hayato Ikeda.

== Political career ==
In 1949, Maeo was inspired by his friend Ikeda's example, running for and winning a seat in the lower house of the National Diet to represent Kyoto's 2nd district. Maeo first entered the Diet as a member of Shigeru Yoshida's Democratic Liberal Party, which later merged to become part of the Liberal Democratic Party (LDP).

A member of Ikeda's "brain trust" (burēn), Maeo was a founding member of Ikeda's Kōchikai faction in 1957. When Ikeda was brought into the cabinet of prime minister Nobusuke Kishi as Minister of Finance, Maeo was brought on as well, becoming Minister of International Trade and Industry.

Towards the end of the Kishi Cabinet, Maeo played a key role in designing Ikeda's "Income Doubling Plan" as chairman of the LDP's Economic Policy Research Committee. The plan, which promised to double Japan's GDP within 10 years' time, became the flagship policy when Ikeda succeeded Kishi in July 1960. Under Ikeda, Maeo was first made chief of the party treasury bureau. He was promoted to Secretary General of the LDP in July 1961 held the position for three years, working hard to support Ikeda's policies in general and the Income Doubling Plan in particular.

When Ikeda died of cancer on 13 August 1965, Maeo stepped in to become the second head of the Kōchikai faction. However, Maeo was not as adept at accumulating political donations as Ikeda had been, and lacked Ikeda's interpersonal skills. As Eisaku Satō won four consecutive terms as prime minister, younger members of the faction became increasingly dissatisfied with Maeo's leadership and finally voted him out in favor of the slightly younger Masayoshi Ōhira

Shortly after being ousted as Kōchikai faction head, Maeo was appointed Minister of Justice by Satō. He then served a stint as the 58th Speaker of the House of Representatives under the administrations of Kakuei Tanaka and Takeo Miki from 1973 to 1976.

In 1979, Maeo lost reelection to his seat in the Diet to a Japan Socialist Party candidate by a mere 174 votes, but regained his seat in the 1980 election. He died of a heart attack in 1981, at the age of 75.

== Legacy ==
Unlike most LDP politicians, Maeo was at heart more of an intellectual than a political power broker. He amassed a personal library of 39,000 volumes and his stated hobby was the study of etymology. He was an extremely taciturn man, such that his colleagues nicknamed him the "Bull in the Darkness" (暗闇の牛, kurayami no ushi) because they had a hard time figuring out what he was thinking. But they later found out that he always listened carefully to what other people said and then took decisive action.

Maeo preferred to work on policy behind the scenes rather than engage in public campaigning and politicking. He displayed no avarice for positions of power, repeatedly turning down cabinet posts he was owed due to his seniority to allow younger men to advance their careers. He also acquired a reputation for unselfishness and impartiality in resolving thorny political problems in a way that was fair to all. Maeo's sense of fair play, lack of personal ambition, and disinterestedness in sharp-elbowed political infighting made him a poor factional leader, leading to his ouster as Kōchikai faction head, but earned him the respect and admiration of both friends and enemies alike. In the 1970s, Maeo became known as one of the "Three Wise Men" (三賢人, san kenjin) of the LDP, alongside Etsusaburo Shiina and Hirokichi Nadao, who exercised a strong influence over LDP politics from behind the scenes.
