= Koshiro Ueki =

Japanese politician (1900–1980)

- 植木 庚子郎
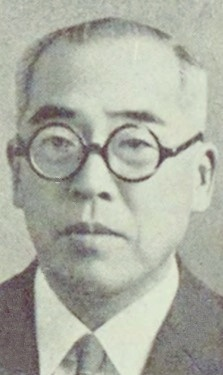
- Ueki in 1954

Minister of Finance
- In office 7 July 1972 – 22 December 1972
- Prime Minister: Kakuei Tanaka
- Preceded by: Mikio Mizuta
- Succeeded by: Kiichi Aichi

Minister of Justice
- In office 17 February 1971 – 5 July 1971
- Prime Minister: Eisaku Satō
- Preceded by: Daisuke Akita
- Succeeded by: Shigesaburo Maeo
- In office 8 December 1960 – 18 July 1962
- Prime Minister: Hayato Ikeda
- Preceded by: Tetsuzo Kojima
- Succeeded by: Kunio Nakagaki

Member of the House of Representatives
- In office 1 October 1952 – 9 December 1976
- Preceded by: Shigeshi Tobishima
- Succeeded by: Wataru Hiraizumi
- Constituency: Fukui at-large

Personal details
- Born: 28 January 1900 Nyū, Fukui, Japan
- Died: 11 March 1980 (aged 80)
- Party: Liberal Democratic
- Other political affiliations: Liberal (1950–1955)
- Education: Tokyo Imperial University

Koshiro Ueki (植木 庚子郎, Ueki Kōshirō; 28 January 1900 – 11 March 1980) was a Japanese politician. He served as justice minister for two terms and as finance minister.

== Early life and education ==
Ueki was born in 1900. He received a law degree from Tokyo Imperial University in 1925.

== Career ==
Following graduation Ueki began his career at the Ministry of Finance. During World War II he was the head of budget bureau. In 1945, he became the head of monopoly bureau at the ministry.

He was elected to the House of Representatives in 1952. He was a member of the Liberal Democratic Party. At the end of the 1950s he was among the Japanese house members union to promote Japan - China trade. He served as justice minister for two terms. He was first appointed to the post on 8 December 1960, replacing Tetsuzo Kojima. Ueki's term ended on 18 Jul 1962 and was replaced by Kunio Nakagaki as justice minister.

Ueki was appointed president of Sagami Women's University in 1968. He again served as justice minister for a brief period between February and July 1971. On 7 July 1972 he was appointed minister of finance to the cabinet led by Prime Minister Kakuei Tanaka, replacing Mikio Mizuta in the post. At age 72 Ueki was the oldest member of the Tanaka cabinet. His term ended on 22 December 1972 when Kiichi Aichi was appointed to the post.

House of Representatives (Japan)
Preceded by Takashi Hayakawa	Chair, Finance Committee of the House of Representatives of Japan; 1959–1960	Succeeded by Katsuichi Yamamoto
Preceded by Hajime Fukuda	Chair, Budget Committee of the House of Representatives of Japan; 1967–1968	Succeeded by Ichitaro Ide
Political offices
Preceded by Tetsuzo Kojima	Minister of Justice; 1960–1962	Succeeded by Kunio Nakagaki
Preceded by Daisuke Akita	Minister of Justice; 1971	Succeeded by Shigesaburo Maeo
Preceded by Mikio Mizuta	Minister of Finance; 1972	Succeeded by Kiichi Aichi
