= Tetsuzo Kojima =

Japanese jurist and politician (1909–1988)

- 小島 徹三
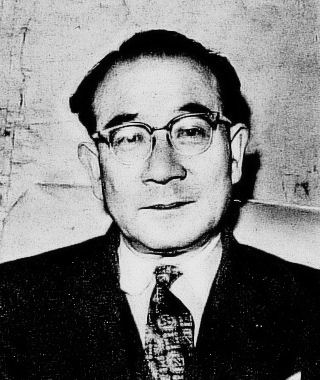
- Kojima in 1960

Minister of Justice
- In office 19 July 1960 – 8 December 1960
- Prime Minister: Hayato Ikeda
- Preceded by: Hiroya Ino
- Succeeded by: Koshiro Ueki

Member of the House of Representatives
- In office 29 December 1969 – 15 November 1976
- Preceded by: Sadamori Iga
- Succeeded by: Sadamori Iga
- Constituency: Hyōgo 5th
- In office 1 October 1952 – 27 December 1967
- Preceded by: Saitō Takao
- Succeeded by: Sadamori Iga
- Constituency: Hyōgo 5th
- In office 22 May 1946 – 23 December 1948
- Preceded by: Constituency established
- Succeeded by: Kiichi Arita
- Constituency: Hyōgo 2nd (1946–1947); Hyōgo 5th (1947–1949)

Personal details
- Born: 29 September 1909 Yabu, Hyōgo, Japan
- Died: 10 January 1988 (aged 78)
- Party: Liberal Democratic
- Other political affiliations: LP (1945–1948); DP (1948–1950); Independent (1950–1952); Kaishintō (1952–1954); JDP (1954–1955)
- Education: Tokyo Imperial University

Tetsuzo Kojima (29 September 1909 – 10 January 1988) was a Japanese jurist who served as the minister of justice briefly between July and December 1960.

== Biography ==
He was born on 29 September 1909 in Hyōgo Prefecture. He was a graduate of Tokyo Imperial University where he received a bachelor's degree in law. He was a member of the Liberal Democratic Party and served in the executive committee of the party heading its judicial affairs committee. He was appointed minister of justice on 19 July 1960 to the cabinet led by Prime Minister Hayato Ikeda, and served in the post until 8 December 1960.
