= Masatsune Ogura =

Japanese businessman and politician (1875–1961)

- 小倉 正恒
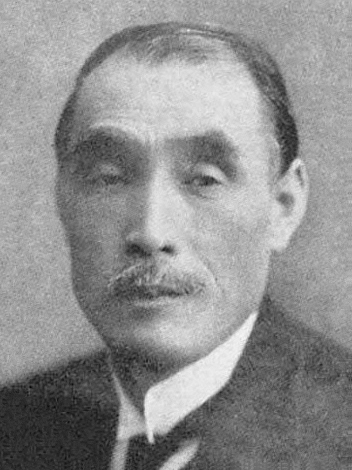
- Ogura in 1940

Minister of Finance
- In office 18 July 1941 – 18 October 1941
- Prime Minister: Fumimaro Konoe
- Preceded by: Isao Kawada
- Succeeded by: Okinori Kaya

Member of the House of Peers
- In office 5 December 1933 – 20 March 1946 Nominated by the Emperor

Personal details
- Born: 22 March 1875 Kanazawa, Ishikawa, Japan
- Died: 20 November 1961 (aged 86)
- Resting place: Aoyama Cemetery
- Party: Independent
- Education: Tokyo Imperial University

Masatsune Ogura (小倉 正恆, Ogura Masatsune; 22 March 1875 – 20 November 1961) was a Japanese businessman and politician who served as minister of finance in 1941. From 1930 to 1941, he was director general of Sumitomo.

== Business career ==
Ogura was born on 22 March 1875 in Kanazawa, Ishikawa Prefecture. His father was a judge. The Ogura family served as retainers for the Nishio clan of the Kanazawa Domain. Ogura was taught Chinese classics by his grandfather as a child, and he retained a lifelong love for Chinese literature. His favourite was the Shiji of Sima Qian.

Ogura attended Fourth Higher School in Kanazawa and Tokyo Imperial University. Upon graduation, he joined the Home Ministry in July 1897, but was dissatisfied with his work. At the invitation of his former superior Masaya Suzuki, he left to join Sumitomo in May 1899. He became general manager of the General Head Office in 1913 and director in 1918. During this time he was responsible for the development of the Konomai Gold Mine, the biggest gold mine in East Asia at the time.

In August 1930, Ogura became the director general of Sumitomo. Ogura streamlined management and reorganised subsidiaries. In 1937, he turned Sumitomo into a joint-stock company.

== Public service ==
While still at Sumitomo, Ogura had been appointed to the House of Peers in December 1933. In April 1941 he was appointed minister of state in the Konoe cabinet and left Sumitomo. When the cabinet reorganised in July, Ogura became minister of finance. Ogura was a proponent of the Greater East Asia Co-Prosperity Sphere and spoke against the initiation of a war against western powers. American scholar Charles Nelson Spinks reported at the time that the cabinet was effectively led by a triumvirate consisting of Konoe, Kiichirō Hiranuma and Ogura.

In October 1941, the Tōjō Cabinet replaced the Konoe cabinet. Tojo requested Ogura to remain but Ogura declined, saying “I joined the cabinet because of Prime Minister Konoe’s earnest request. I have no reason or intention to remain in office.”

During the Pacific War, Ogura served as president the Wartime Finance Bank. He resigned in March 1944 to serve as supreme economic advisor to the Reorganized National Government of the Republic of China.

Ogura was mentioned in the Tokyo Trials, but found not guilty of any war crimes. In his later years, he was involved in cultural exchange between Japan and China. He died on 29 November 1961, at the age of 87. His grave is in Aoyama Cemetery in Tokyo.
