= Minister of Justice (Japan) =

Japanese cabinet role

- 法務大臣
- Emblem of the Government of Japan

- Incumbent; Takashi Yamashita since 17 September 2026
- Ministry of Justice
- Style: His Excellency
- Member of: Cabinet of Japan; National Intelligence Council
- Reports to: Prime Minister of Japan
- Appointer: Prime Minister of Japan; attested to by the Emperor
- Formation: August 1, 1952; 74 years ago
- Deputy: State Minister of Justice
- Salary: ¥20,916,000

The Minister of Justice (法務大臣, Hōmu Daijin) is a member of the Cabinet of Japan and is the leader and chief executive of the Ministry of Justice. The minister is nominated by the Prime Minister of Japan and is appointed by the Emperor of Japan.

The current minister is Takashi Yamashita, who took office on 17 September 2026.

== Organization and authority ==
On 1 August 1952, the Attorney General's Office became the Ministry of Justice, headed by a Minister of Justice rather than an attorney general.

By law, the Minister of Justice is authorized to order executions of any inmate on death row at anytime, making the position highly influential. The Minister is also authorized to deport or grant any foreigner residential or permanent visas.

== List of ministers of justice ==
Independent Liberal Democratic Japan Renewal Democratic Socialist Democratic

Justice minister			Term of office			Prime minister
#	Portrait	Name	Took office	Left office	Days	Prime minister
1		Tokutaro Kimura	August 1, 1952	October 30, 1952	90	Shigeru Yoshida
2		Takeru Inukai	October 30, 1952	April 22, 1954	539	Shigeru Yoshida
3		Ryogo Kato	April 22, 1954	June 19, 1954	58	Shigeru Yoshida
4		Naoshi Ohara	June 19, 1954	December 10, 1954	174	Shigeru Yoshida
5		Shiro Hamamura	December 10, 1954	November 22, 1955	347	Ichirō Hatoyama
6		Ryozo Makino	November 22, 1955	December 23, 1956	397	Ichirō Hatoyama
7		Umekichi Nakamura	December 23, 1956	July 10, 1957	199	Tanzan Ishibashi
7		Umekichi Nakamura	December 23, 1956	July 10, 1957	199	Nobusuke Kishi
8		Toshiki Karasa	July 10, 1957	June 12, 1958	337	Nobusuke Kishi
9		Kiichi Aichi	June 12, 1958	June 18, 1959	371	Nobusuke Kishi
10		Hiroya Ino	June 18, 1959	July 19, 1960	397	Nobusuke Kishi
11		Tetsuzo Kojima	July 19, 1960	December 8, 1960	142	Hayato Ikeda
12		Koshiro Ueki	December 8, 1960	July 18, 1962	587	Hayato Ikeda
13		Kunio Nakagaki	July 18, 1962	July 18, 1963	365	Hayato Ikeda
14		Okinori Kaya	July 18, 1963	July 18, 1964	366	Hayato Ikeda
15		Hitoshi Takahashi	July 18, 1964	June 3, 1965	320	Hayato Ikeda
15		Hitoshi Takahashi	July 18, 1964	June 3, 1965	320	Eisaku Satō
16		Mitsujirō Ishii	June 3, 1965	December 3, 1966	548	Eisaku Satō
17		Isaji Tanaka	December 3, 1966	November 25, 1967	357	Eisaku Satō
18		Bunzo Akama	November 25, 1967	November 30, 1968	371	Eisaku Satō
19		Kichinosuke Saigo	November 30, 1968	January 14, 1970	410	Eisaku Satō
20		Takeji Kobayashi	January 14, 1970	February 9, 1971	391	Eisaku Satō
21		Daisuke Akita	February 9, 1971	February 17, 1971	8	Eisaku Satō
22 (12)		Koshiro Ueki	February 17, 1971	July 5, 1971	138	Eisaku Satō
23		Shigesaburō Maeo	July 5, 1971	July 7, 1972	368	Eisaku Satō
24		Yūichi Kōri	July 7, 1972	December 22, 1972	168	Kakuei Tanaka
25		Isaji Tanaka	December 22, 1972	November 25, 1973	338	Kakuei Tanaka
26		Umekichi Nakamura	November 25, 1973	November 11, 1974	351	Kakuei Tanaka
27		Seigo Hamano	November 11, 1974	December 9, 1974	28	Kakuei Tanaka
28		Osamu Inaba	December 9, 1974	December 24, 1976	746	Takeo Miki
29		Hajime Fukuda	December 24, 1976	October 5, 1977	285	Takeo Fukuda
30		Mitsuo Setayama	October 5, 1977	December 7, 1978	428	Takeo Fukuda
31		Yoshimi Furui	December 7, 1978	November 9, 1979	337	Masayoshi Ōhira
32		Tadao Kuraishi	November 9, 1979	July 17, 1980	251	Masayoshi Ōhira
33		Seisuke Okuno	July 17, 1980	November 30, 1980	502	Zenkō Suzuki
34		Michita Sakata	November 30, 1980	November 27, 1982	727	Zenkō Suzuki
35		Hatano Akira	November 27, 1982	December 27, 1983	395	Yasuhiro Nakasone
36		Eisaku Sumi	December 27, 1983	November 1, 1984	310	Yasuhiro Nakasone
37		Hitoshi Shimazaki	November 1, 1984	December 28, 1985	422	Yasuhiro Nakasone
38		Seigo Suzuki	December 28, 1985	July 22, 1986	206	Yasuhiro Nakasone
39		Kaname Endo	July 22, 1986	November 6, 1987	472	Yasuhiro Nakasone
40		Yukio Hasegawa	November 6, 1987	December 27, 1988	416	Noboru Takeshita
41		Takashi Hasegawa	December 27, 1998	December 30, 1998	3	Noboru Takeshita
42		Masami Takatsuji	December 30, 1998	June 3 1989	185	Noboru Takeshita
43		Kazuo Tanikawa	June 3 1989	August 10, 1989	38	Sōsuke Uno
44		Masao Goto	August 10, 1989	February 28, 1990	202	Toshiki Kaifu
45		Shin Hasegawa	February 28, 1990	September 13, 1990	197	Toshiki Kaifu
46		Seiroku Kajiyama	September 13, 1990	December 29, 1990	107	Toshiki Kaifu
47		Megumi Sato	December 29, 1990	November 5, 1991	676	Toshiki Kaifu
48		Takashi Tawara	November 5, 1991	December 12, 1992	403	Kiichi Miyazawa
49		Masaharu Gotōda	December 12, 1992	August 9, 1993	240	Kiichi Miyazawa
50		Akira Mikazuki	August 9, 1993	April 28, 1994	262	Morihiro Hosokawa
51		Shigeto Nagano	April 28, 1994	May 8, 1994	10	Tsutomu Hata
52		Hiroshi Nakai	May 8, 1994	June 30, 1994	53	Tsutomu Hata
53		Isao Maeda	June 30, 1994	August 8, 1995	404	Tomiichi Murayama
54		Tomoharu Tazawa	August 8, 1995	October 8, 1995	61	Tomiichi Murayama
55		Hiroshi Miyazawa	October 8, 1995	January 11, 1996	95	Tomiichi Murayama
56		Ritsuko Nagao	January 11, 1996	November 7, 1996	301	Ryutaro Hashimoto
57		Isao Matsuura	November 7, 1996	September 11, 1997	308	Ryutaro Hashimoto
58		Kokichi Shimoinaba	September 11, 1997	July 30, 1998	322	Ryutaro Hashimoto
59		Shozaburo Nakamura	July 30, 1998	March 8, 1999	221	Keizō Obuchi
60		Takao Jinnouchi	March 8, 1999	October 5, 1999	211	Keizō Obuchi
61		Hideo Usui	October 5, 1999	July 4, 2000	273	Keizō Obuchi
61		Hideo Usui	October 5, 1999	July 4, 2000	273	Yoshirō Mori
62		Okiharu Yasuoka	July 4, 2000	December 5, 2000	154	Yoshirō Mori
63		Masahiko Kōmura	December 5, 2000	April 26, 2001	142	Yoshirō Mori
64		Mayumi Moriyama	April 26, 2001	September 22, 2003	879	Junichiro Koizumi
65		Daizō Nozawa	September 22, 2003	September 27, 2004	371	Junichiro Koizumi
66		Chieko Nōno	September 27, 2004	October 31, 2005	399	Junichiro Koizumi
67		Seiken Sugiura	October 31, 2005	September 26, 2006	330	Junichiro Koizumi
68		Jinen Nagase	September 26, 2006	August 27, 2007	335	Shinzo Abe
69		Kunio Hatoyama	August 27, 2007	August 2, 2008	341	Shinzo Abe
69		Kunio Hatoyama	August 27, 2007	August 2, 2008	341	Yasuo Fukuda
70		Okiharu Yasuoka	August 2, 2008	September 24, 2008	53	Yasuo Fukuda
71		Eisuke Mori	September 24, 2008	September 16, 2009	357	Taro Aso
72		Keiko Chiba	September 16, 2009	September 7, 2010	356	Yukio Hatoyama
72		Keiko Chiba	September 16, 2009	September 7, 2010	356	Naoto Kan
73		Minoru Yanagida	September 7, 2010	November 22, 2010	76	Naoto Kan
74		Yoshito Sengoku	November 22, 2010	January 14, 2011	53	Naoto Kan
75		Satsuki Eda	January 14, 2011	September 2, 2011	231	Naoto Kan
76		Hideo Hiraoka	September 2, 2011	January 13, 2012	133	Yoshihiko Noda
77		Toshio Ogawa	January 13, 2012	June 4, 2012	143	Yoshihiko Noda
78		Makoto Taki	June 4, 2012	October 1, 2012	119	Yoshihiko Noda
79		Keishu Tanaka	October 1, 2012	October 23, 2012	22	Yoshihiko Noda
80 (78)		Makoto Taki	October 23, 2012	December 26, 2012	64	Yoshihiko Noda
81		Sadakazu Tanigaki	December 26, 2012	September 3, 2014	616	Shinzo Abe
82		Midori Matsushima	September 3, 2014	October 20, 2014	47	Shinzo Abe
83		Yōko Kamikawa	October 20, 2014	October 7, 2015	352	Shinzo Abe
84		Mitsuhide Iwaki	October 7, 2015	August 3, 2016	301	Shinzo Abe
85		Katsutoshi Kaneda	August 3, 2016	August 3, 2017	365	Shinzo Abe
86 (83)		Yōko Kamikawa	August 3, 2017	October 2, 2018	425	Shinzo Abe
87		Takashi Yamashita	October 2, 2018	September 11, 2019	344	Shinzo Abe
88		Katsuyuki Kawai	September 11, 2019	October 31, 2019	50	Shinzo Abe
89		Masako Mori	October 31, 2019	September 16, 2020	321	Shinzo Abe
90 (83)		Yōko Kamikawa	September 16, 2020	October 4, 2021	383	Yoshihide Suga
91		Yoshihisa Furukawa	October 4, 2021	10 August 2022	310	Fumio Kishida
92		Yasuhiro Hanashi	10 August 2022	11 November 2022	93	Fumio Kishida
93		Ken Saitō	November 11, 2022	September 13, 2023	306	Fumio Kishida
94		Ryuji Koizumi	September 13, 2023	October 1, 2024	384	Fumio Kishida
95		Hideki Makihara	October 1, 2024	November 11, 2024	41	Shigeru Ishiba
96		Keisuke Suzuki	November 11, 2024	October 21, 2025	344	Shigeru Ishiba
97		Hiroshi Hiraguchi	October 21, 2025	September 17, 2026	331	Sanae Takaichi
98 (87)		Takashi Yamashita	September 17, 2026	Incumbent	16	Sanae Takaichi
