= Kiyo Takeda =

Japanese politician (1896–1954)

- 武田 キヨ

Member of the House of Representatives; from Hiroshima
- In office 10 April 1946 – 23 December 1948
- Preceded by: Constituency established
- Succeeded by: Hayato Ikeda
- Constituency: At-large district (1946–1947); 2nd district (1947–1948)

Personal details
- Born: 21 September 1896 Zeze, Shiga, Japan
- Died: 14 March 1954 (aged 57)
- Party: Democratic
- Other political affiliations: Liberal (1945–1948)
- Education: Tokyo Women's Higher Normal School

Kiyo Takeda (Japanese: 武田キヨ; 21 September 1896 – 14 March 1954) was a Japanese educator and politician. She was one of the first group of women elected to the House of Representatives in 1946.

== Biography ==
Takeda was born in Zeze (now part of Ōtsu) in 1896. The family later moved to Yamaguchi Prefecture when her father was transferred there for work. She attended Yamaguchi Girls' School and graduated from Tokyo Women's Higher Normal School in 1919. She subsequently worked as a teacher at Kure Girl's High School and Kure Port Junior High School, and served as headmistress of several schools including Tokyo Yakumo Girls' School.

After World War II, Takeda joined the Liberal Party. She was a candidate for the party in Hiroshima in the 1946 general elections (the first in which women could vote), and was elected to the House of Representatives. She was re-elected in the 1947 elections, shortly after which she joined the Democratic Party. She lost her seat in the 1949 elections and died of a cerebral haemorrhage in 1954.
