= Kōzō Watanabe (Liberal Democratic Party politician) =

Japanese politician

- 渡辺 紘三

Member of the House of Representatives
- In office 10 December 1972 – 24 January 1990
- Preceded by: Hajime Watanabe
- Succeeded by: Uichirō Iwamura
- Constituency: Niigata 2nd

Personal details
- Born: 28 January 1942 Kitakanbara, Niigata, Japan
- Died: 16 September 2007 (aged 65) Shinjuku, Tokyo, Japan
- Political party: Liberal Democratic
- Parent: Yoshio Watanabe (father)
- Relatives: Hajime Watanabe

Kōzō Watanabe (渡辺 紘三, Watanabe Kōzō; 28 January 1942 – 16 September 2007) was a Japanese politician of the Liberal Democratic Party who served in the House of Representatives from 1972 to 1990. He was best known as an influential supporter of Kakuei Tanaka's faction, though had to retire early from politics in 1990 due to diabetes.

He is to be distinguished from the homonymous Kōzō Watanabe (Democratic Party politician) (different given name characters 渡部恒三) who was nicknamed "Kennedy" in the diet, while Kozo Watanabe (born 1942) was known as the spokesman of the Etsuzankai (ja:越山会) associated with Kakuei Tanaka.

He was elected in Niigata Prefecture's 2nd Electoral District in 1972 and served in vice-minister posts at the Ministry of Posts and Telecommunications (Japan) and the Ministry of Construction (Japan).
