= Okinori Kaya =

Japanese politician, war criminal 1889-1977

- 賀屋 興宣
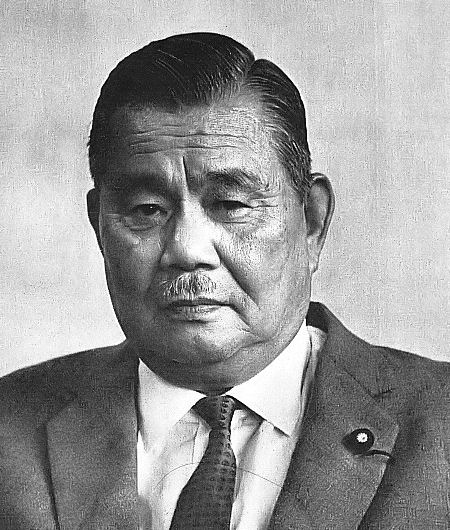
- Kaya in 1962

Minister of Justice
- In office 18 July 1963 – 18 July 1964
- Prime Minister: Hayato Ikeda
- Preceded by: Kunio Nakagaki
- Succeeded by: Hitoshi Takahashi

Minister of Finance
- In office 18 October 1941 – 19 February 1944
- Prime Minister: Hideki Tojo
- Preceded by: Masatsune Ogura
- Succeeded by: Sotaro Ishiwata
- In office 4 June 1937 – 26 May 1938
- Prime Minister: Fumimaro Konoe
- Preceded by: Toyotarō Yūki
- Succeeded by: Shigeaki Ikeda

Member of the House of Representatives
- In office 23 May 1958 – 13 November 1972
- Preceded by: Hirokawa Kozen
- Succeeded by: Michio Ochi
- Constituency: Tokyo 3rd

Member of the House of Peers
- In office 9 December 1938 – 3 December 1945 Nominated by the Emperor

Personal details
- Born: 30 January 1889 Hiroshima, Japan
- Died: 9 May 1977 (aged 88) Tokyo, Japan
- Party: Liberal Democratic
- Education: Tokyo Imperial University

Okinori Kaya (賀屋 興宣, Kaya Okinori; 30 January 1889 – 9 May 1977) was a Japanese bureaucrat and politician who served as Minister of Finance from 1937 to 1938 and 1941 to 1944, and as Minister of Justice from 1963 to 1964.

Born in Hiroshima, Kaya graduated from Tokyo Imperial University and joined the Ministry of Finance. After a successful career he became Minister of Finance in the first cabinet of Fumimaro Konoe and again in the wartime cabinet of Hideki Tojo. After the Japanese surrender he was sentenced to life in prison by the International Military Tribunal for the Far East. Paroled in 1955, Kaya was rehabilitated and served in the House of Representatives for the Liberal Democratic Party, and as Minister of Justice under Hayato Ikeda.

== Early life ==
Okinori Fujii was born on 30 January 1889, in Hiroshima, as the son of a scholar. At the age of four, he was adopted by his mother's family to carry on the lineage of the Kaya family.

Kaya attended the prestigious First Higher School in Tokyo where he was classmates with Jōtarō Kawakami, who became a socialist leader later in life. Despite their serious political differences, the two men remained friends. Kaya then went on to Tokyo Imperial University. After graduating he joined the Ministry of Finance, taking the path of an elite bureaucrat.

In the Ministry, Kaya often worked in the Budget Bureau. Hayato Ikeda, who was also from Hiroshima, became a close subordinate. Kaya became chief of the Budget Bureau in 1934, of the Finance Bureau in 1936, and in 1937 he was appointed vice minister under Finance Minister Toyotarō Yūki. When Fumimaro Konoe formed his cabinet in June the same year Kaya was selected as Minister of Finance. He served until the end of the cabinet in May 1938, and was afterwards appointed a lifetime member of the House of Peers.

In August 1938 Kaya was appointed president of the North China Development Company, a quasi-governmental company promoting industrial development in North China under Japanese control. He remained in this position until he was reappointed Minister of Finance in the cabinet of Hideki Tojo in October 1941. As such he was in charge of wartime finances until the Tojo cabinet resigned in February 1944.

== Post-war career ==
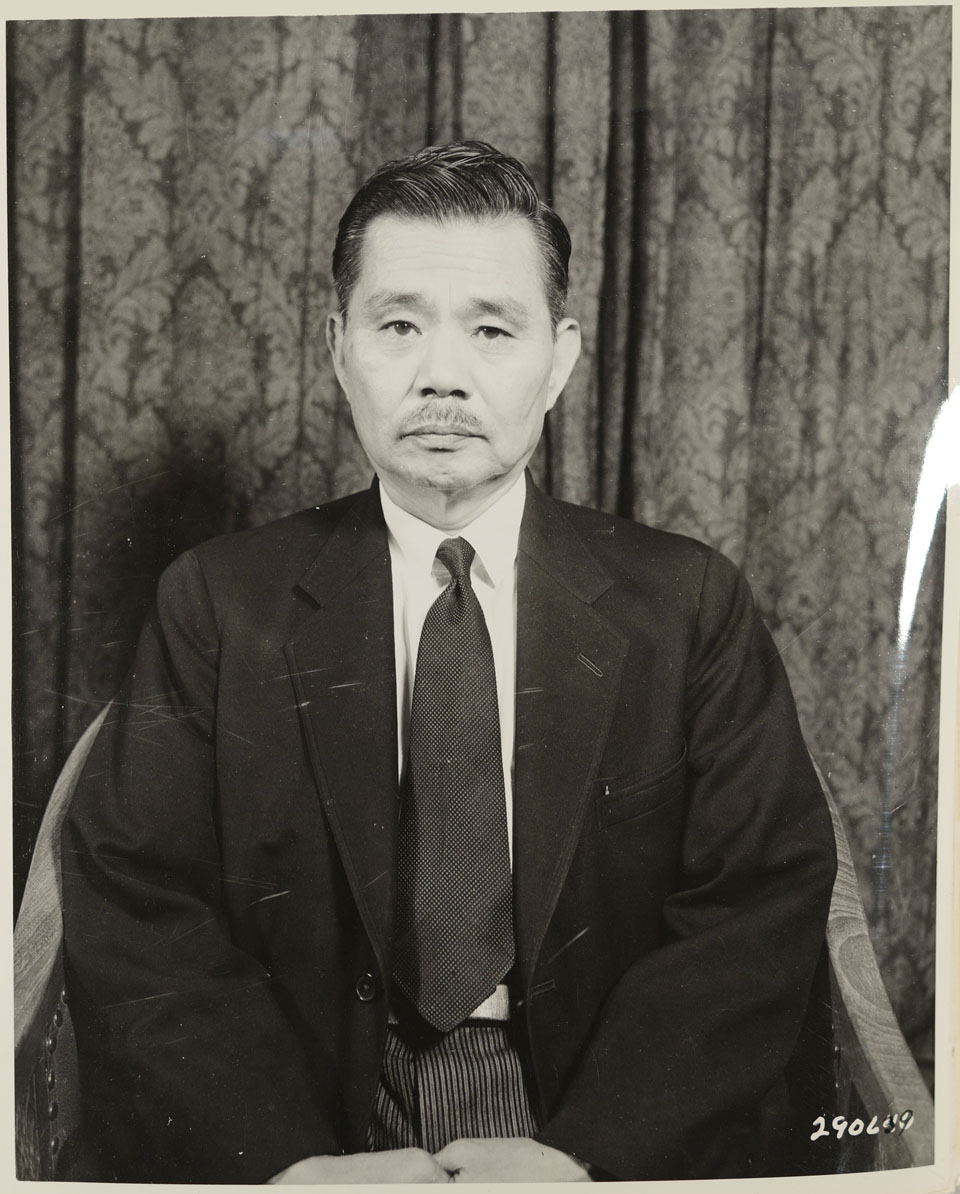
Kaya in 1947

After the surrender of Japan, Kaya was arrested as a war criminal for his role in the wartime government. The International Military Tribunal for the Far East sentenced him to life in prison. In Sugamo Prison he befriended his fellow inmate and former cabinet colleague Nobusuke Kishi.

Kaya was paroled in 1955 and his sentence was later commuted to time already served. He became a private adviser to Kishi when the latter became prime minister in 1957. Kaya was elected to the House of Representatives for the Liberal Democratic Party in the 1958 general election. He was part of the Kishi's faction, but was also close to his former subordinate Ikeda. In June 1959, Kishi appointed Kaya as chairman of the LDP Foreign Affairs Research Council, where he played a key role in the 1960 revision of the U.S.-Japan Security Treaty.

Ikeda, who had followed Kishi as prime minister, made Kaya Chairman of the Policy Research Council in 1962. In the same year he became chairman of the Japan War-Bereaved Families Association, a position he held until his death. In 1963 joined the cabinet as Minister of Justice and served as such until 1964. Kaya retired from the Diet in 1972 and died in 1977.

Kaya was an advocate for strong ties with Taiwan, South Korea and the United States. A staunch conservative and anti-communist, an obituary quotes him as saying "communism means only a dog's life."

Party political offices
Preceded by Kakuei Tanaka	Chairman of the Policy Research Council, Liberal Democratic Party; 1962-1963	Succeeded by Takeo Miki
Political offices
Preceded by Kunio Nakagaki	Minister of Justice; 1963–1964	Succeeded by Hitoshi Takahashi
Preceded by Masatsune Ogura	Minister of Finance; 1941–1944	Succeeded by Sotaro Ishiwata
Preceded by Toyotarō Yūki	Minister of Finance; 1937–1938	Succeeded by Shigeaki Ikeda
Preceded by Takeo Kawagoe	Vice Minister of Finance; 1937	Succeeded by Sotaro Ishiwata
Other offices
Preceded by Seiichirō Yasui	Chairman of the Japan War-Bereaved Families Association; 1962-1977	Succeeded by Isamu Murakami
