= Kunio Nakagaki =

Japanese politician

- 中垣 國男
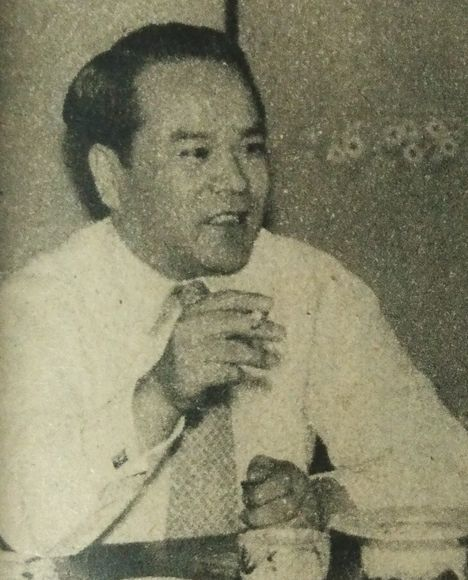
- Nakagaki in 1952

Minister of Justice
- In office 18 July 1962 – 18 July 1963
- Prime Minister: Hayato Ikeda
- Preceded by: Koshiro Ueki
- Succeeded by: Okinori Kaya

Member of the House of Representatives
- In office 28 February 1955 – 9 December 1976
- Preceded by: Shirō Nakano
- Succeeded by: Shirō Nakano
- Constituency: Aichi 4th
- In office 26 April 1947 – 28 August 1952
- Preceded by: Constituency established
- Succeeded by: Kōdō Itō
- Constituency: Aichi 4th

Personal details
- Born: 24 June 1911 Ichiki, Kagoshima, Japan
- Died: 2 April 1987 (aged 75)
- Party: Liberal Democratic (1955–1987)
- Other political affiliations: Democratic (1947–1950); Liberal (1950–1955)
- Education: Toyo University

Kunio Nakagaki (中垣 國男, Nakagaki Kunio; 24 June 1911 – 2 April 1987) was a Japanese Minister of Justice. He was a pro-death penalty activist and approved the executions of 33 people, including Matsuo Fujimoto and Ri Chin'u, who became the basis for the film Death by Hanging. On 11 September 1962, he commanded Fujimoto's execution and he was executed three days after. He also attempted to execute Sadamichi Hirasawa, but failed. Hirasawa was not executed, and died on 10 May 1987.

House of Representatives (Japan)
Preceded by Kiroku Kanke	Chair, Audit Committee of the House of Representatives of Japan; 1951–1953	Succeeded by Shoji Tanaka
Preceded by Kazuo Tanikawa	Chair, Legal Affairs Committee of the House of Representatives of Japan; 1972–1973	Succeeded by Hisao Kodaira
Political offices
Preceded by Koshiro Ueki	Minister of Justice; 1962–1963	Succeeded by Okinori Kaya
