= Mikio Mizuta =

Japanese jurist, educator and politician (1905–1976)

- 水田 三喜男
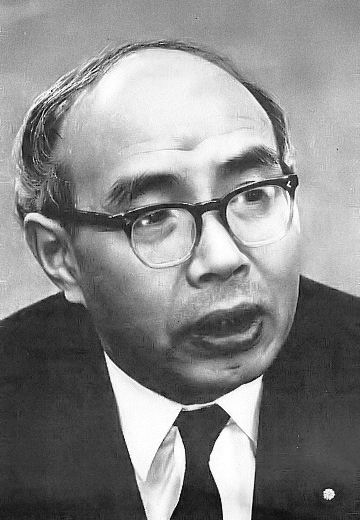
- Mizuta in 1962

Minister of Finance
- In office 5 July 1971 – 7 July 1972
- Prime Minister: Eisaku Satō
- Preceded by: Takeo Fukuda
- Succeeded by: Koshiro Ueki
- In office 3 December 1966 – 30 November 1968
- Prime Minister: Eisaku Satō
- Preceded by: Takeo Fukuda
- Succeeded by: Takeo Fukuda
- In office 19 July 1960 – 18 July 1962
- Prime Minister: Hayato Ikeda
- Preceded by: Eisaku Satō
- Succeeded by: Kakuei Tanaka

Minister of International Trade and Industry
- In office 23 December 1956 – 10 July 1957
- Prime Minister: Tanzan Ishibashi; Nobusuke Kishi
- Preceded by: Tanzan Ishibashi
- Succeeded by: Shigesaburō Maeo

Director-General of the Economic Deliberation Agency
- In office 3 March 1953 – 21 May 1953
- Prime Minister: Shigeru Yoshida
- Preceded by: Sankurō Ogasawara
- Succeeded by: Kiyohide Okano

Member of the House of Representatives
- In office 11 April 1946 – 12 December 1976
- Preceded by: Constituency established
- Succeeded by: Chiyose Chiba
- Constituency: Chiba at-large (1946–1947); Chiba 3rd (1947–1976)

Personal details
- Born: 13 April 1905 Kamogawa, Chiba, Japan
- Died: 22 December 1976 (aged 71) Bunkyō, Tokyo, Japan
- Party: Liberal Democratic
- Other political affiliations: JLP (1945–1948); DLP (1948–1950); LP (1950–1955)
- Children: Noriko Mizuta
- Education: Kyoto University

Mikio Mizuta (水田 三喜男, Mizuta Mikio; 13 April 1905 – 22 December 1976) was a Japanese jurist, educator and politician. He served as finance minister of Japan three times and was the founder of Josai University.

== Early life and education ==
Mizuta was born in 1905 in Kamogawa, Chiba Prefecture. He held a law degree from Kyoto Imperial University.

== Career ==
Mizuta was elected to the House of Representatives in 1946 after World War II. He was a member of the Liberal Democratic Party (LDP). He was the minister of trade and industry from 23 December 1956 to 10 July 1957.

He served as the minister of finance for three terms. He was first appointed to the post on 19 July 1960 and was in office until 18 July 1962. During this period Japan suffered a financial crisis running a deficit of $700m in July 1961. It fell on Mizuta to successfully negotiate short term loans with three American banks. Despite his nerves, he chain-smoked his way to a successful outcome using Japan's underlying financial strength as security.

Mizuta was the chair of the LDP policy research committee from July 1966 to December 1966 when he was again appointed finance minister. His second ministerial term lasted until 30 November 1968. From 12 January 1970 to 5 July 1971 he was again the chair of the LDP policy research committee. His third term as finance minister was between 5 July 1971 and 7 July 1972. From 25 November 1973 to 11 November 1974 Mizuta served again as the chair of the LDP policy research committee. Mizuta also as Special Envoy to attend Spanish Generalissimo Francisco Franco's Funeral.

He founded Josai University in 1965. He was the chancellor and president of it and the house member until his death on 22 December 1976.

=== Legacy ===
The house where Mizuta was born in Kamogawa is a nationally registered asset and a public museum run by Josai University.

House of Representatives (Japan)
New title	Chair, Committee on Economic Stabilization of the House of Representatives; 1948	Succeeded by Chūbē Onose
Party political offices
Preceded by Office established	Chairman of the Policy Research Council, Liberal Democratic Party; 1955–1956	Succeeded by Toichirō Tsukada
Preceded by Munenori Akagi	Chairman of the Policy Research Council, Liberal Democratic Party; 1966	Succeeded by Naomi Nishimura
Preceded by Nemoto Ryūtarō	Chairman of the Policy Research Council, Liberal Democratic Party; 1970–1971	Succeeded by Zentaro Kosaka
Preceded by Tadao Kuraishi	Chairman of the Policy Research Council, Liberal Democratic Party; 1973–1974	Succeeded by Sadanori Yamanaka
Political offices
Preceded by Tanzan Ishibashi; Acting	Minister of International Trade and Industry; 1956–1957	Succeeded by Shigesaburo Maeo
Preceded by Eisaku Satō	Minister of Finance; 1960–1962	Succeeded by Kakuei Tanaka
Preceded by Takeo Fukuda	Minister of Finance; 1966–1968	Succeeded by Takeo Fukuda
Preceded by Takeo Fukuda	Minister of Finance; 1971–1972	Succeeded by Koshiro Ueki
