= Minister of Finance (Japan) =

Japanese cabinet role

- Emblem of the Government of Japan

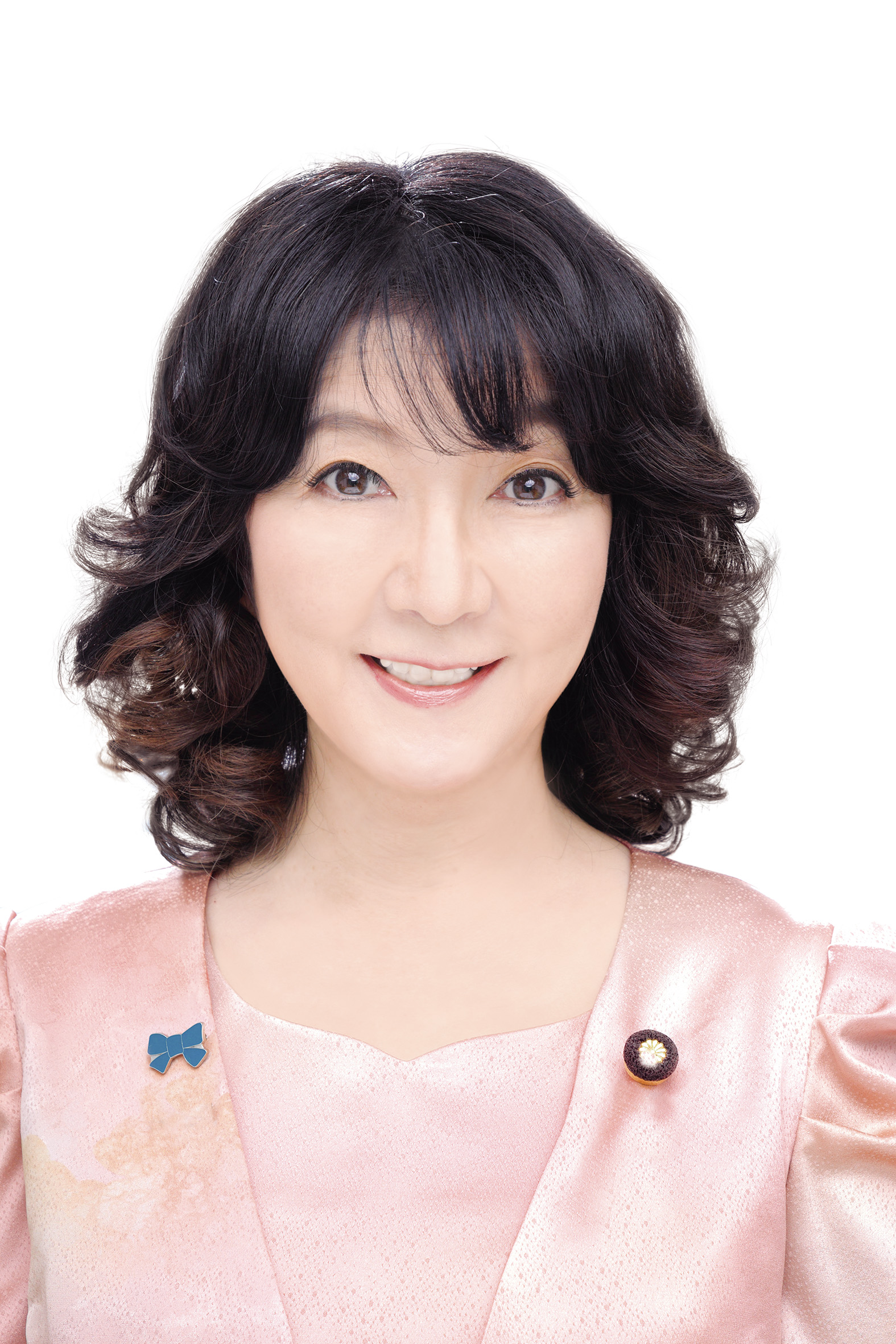
- Incumbent; Satsuki Katayama since 21 October 2025
- Ministry of Finance
- Style: Her Excellency
- Member of: Cabinet of Japan; National Security Council; National Intelligence Council
- Reports to: Prime Minister of Japan
- Appointer: Prime Minister of Japan attested to by the Emperor
- Precursor: 大蔵大臣 (Ōkura Daijin)
- Formation: January 6, 2001; 25 years ago
- Deputy: State Minister of Finance
- Salary: ¥20,916,000

The Minister of Finance (財務大臣, Zaimu Daijin) is a member of the Cabinet of Japan and is the leader and chief executive of the Ministry of Finance. The minister is also a statutory member of the National Security Council and is nominated by the Prime Minister of Japan and is appointed by the Emperor of Japan.

Until 2001, the Japanese title was 大蔵大臣 (Ōkura Daijin). Both the current and previous title are translated as "Minister of Finance".

The current minister is Satsuki Katayama, who took office on 21 October 2025.

== List of ministers ==
=== Prewar (1900–1946) ===
#	Name	Took office	Left office
1	Masayoshi Matsukata	1885	1892
	Watanabe Kunitake	1892	1895
2	Masakata Matsukata	1895	1895
3	Watanabe Kunitake	1895	1896
4	Masayoshi Matsukata	1896	1898
5	Inoue Kaoru	1898	1898
6	Matsuda Masahisa	1898	1898
7	Masakata Matsukata	1898	1900
8	Watanabe Kunitake	1900	1901
9	Saionji Kinmochi	1901	1901
10	Sone Arasuke	1901	1906
11	Yoshiro Sakatani	1906	1908
12	Matsuda Masahisa	1908	1908
	Katsura Tarō	1908	1911
	Yamamoto Tatsuo	1911	1912
	Wakatsuki Reijirō (1st)	1912	1913
	Takahashi Korekiyo (1st)	1913	1914
	Wakatsuki Reijirō (2nd)	1914	1915
	Taketomi Tokitoshi	1915	1916
	Terauchi Masatake	1916	1916
	Kazue Shōda (1st)	1916	1918
	Takahashi Korekiyo (2nd)	1918	1922
	Otohiko Ichiki	1922	1923
	Junnosuke Inoue (1st)	1923	1924
	Kazue Shōda (2nd)	1924	1924
	Osachi Hamaguchi	1924	1925
	Seiji Hayami	1925	1925
	Kataoka Naoharu	1925	1927
	Takahashi Korekiyo (3rd)	1927	1927
	Chuzo Mitsuchi	1927	1929
	Junnosuke Inoue (2nd)	1929	1931
	Takahashi Korekiyo (4th)	1931	1934
	Sadanobu Fujii	1934	1934
	Takahashi Korekiyo (5th)	1934	1936
	Machida Chūji	1936	1936
	Eiichi Baba	1936	1937
	Toyotaro Yuki	1937	1937
	Okinori Kaya (1st)	1937	1938
	Shigeaki Ikeda	1938	1939
	Sotaro Ishiwata (1st)	1939	1939
	Kazuo Aoki	1939	1940
	Yukio Sakurauchi	1940	1940
	Isao Kawada	1940	1941
	Masatsune Ogura	1941	1941
	Okinori Kaya (2nd)	1941	1944
	Sotaro Ishiwata (2nd)	1944	1945
	Juichi Tsushima	1945	1945
	Toyosaku Hirose	1945	1945
	Juichi Tsushima (2nd)	1945	1945
	Keizō Shibusawa	1945	1946

=== Postwar (1946–present) ===
Liberal (1945)
Socialist
Ryokufūkai
Democratic (1947)
Democratic Liberal
Liberal (1950)
Independent
Democratic (1954)
Liberal Democratic
Japan New Party
New Party Sakigake
Japan Renewal Party
Democratic

Finance Minister			Term of office			Prime Minister
#	Portrait	Name	Took office	Left office	Days	Prime Minister
32		Tanzan Ishibashi	May 22, 1946	May 24, 1947	367	Shigeru Yoshida
-		Tetsu Katayama (Acting)	May 24, 1947	June 1, 1947	8	Tetsu Katayama
33		Shōtarō Yano	June 1, 1947	June 25, 1947	24	Tetsu Katayama
34		Takeo Kurusu	June 25, 1947	March 10, 1948	259	Tetsu Katayama
35		Tokutarō Kitamura	March 10, 1948	October 15, 1948	223	Hitoshi Ashida
36		Sanroku Izumiyama	October 19, 1948	December 14, 1948	56	Shigeru Yoshida
37		Shinzō Ōya (Interim)	December 14, 1948	February 16, 1949	64	Shigeru Yoshida
38		Hayato Ikeda	February 16, 1949	October 30, 1952	1352	Shigeru Yoshida
39		Tadaharu Mukai	October 30, 1952	May 21, 1953	203	Shigeru Yoshida
40		Sankurō Ogasawara	May 21, 1953	December 10, 1954	568	Shigeru Yoshida
41		Hisato Ichimada	December 10, 1954	November 22, 1955	744	Ichirō Hatoyama
41		Hisato Ichimada	November 22, 1955	December 23, 1956	744	Ichirō Hatoyama
(38)		Hayato Ikeda	December 23, 1956	July 10, 1957	199	Tanzan Ishibashi
(38)		Hayato Ikeda	December 23, 1956	July 10, 1957	199	Nobusuke Kishi
(41)		Hisato Ichimada	July 10, 1957	June 12, 1958	337	Nobusuke Kishi
42		Eisaku Satō	June 12, 1958	July 19, 1960	768	Nobusuke Kishi
43		Mikio Mizuta	July 19, 1960	July 18, 1962	729	Hayato Ikeda
44		Kakuei Tanaka	July 18, 1962	June 3, 1965	1051	Hayato Ikeda
44		Kakuei Tanaka	July 18, 1962	June 3, 1965	1051	Eisaku Satō
45		Takeo Fukuda	June 3, 1965	December 3, 1966	548	Eisaku Satō
(43)		Mikio Mizuta	December 3, 1966	November 30, 1968	728	Eisaku Satō
(45)		Takeo Fukuda	November 30, 1968	July 5, 1971	947	Eisaku Satō
(43)		Mikio Mizuta	July 5, 1971	July 7, 1972	368	Eisaku Satō
46		Koshiro Ueki	July 7, 1972	December 22, 1972	168	Kakuei Tanaka
47		Kiichi Aichi	December 22, 1972	November 23, 1973	336	Kakuei Tanaka
(45)		Takeo Fukuda	November 25, 1973	July 16, 1974	233	Kakuei Tanaka
48		Masayoshi Ōhira	July 16, 1974	December 24, 1976	892	Kakuei Tanaka
48		Masayoshi Ōhira	July 16, 1974	December 24, 1976	892	Takeo Miki
49		Hideo Bo	December 24, 1976	November 28, 1977	339	Takeo Fukuda
50		Tatsuo Murayama	November 28, 1977	December 7, 1978	374	Takeo Fukuda
51		Ippei Kaneko	December 7, 1978	November 9, 1979	337	Masayoshi Ōhira
52		Noboru Takeshita	November 9, 1979	July 17, 1980	251	Masayoshi Ōhira
53		Michio Watanabe	July 17, 1980	November 27, 1982	863	Zenkō Suzuki
(52)		Noboru Takeshita	November 27, 1982	July 22, 1986	1333	Yasuhiro Nakasone
54		Kiichi Miyazawa	July 22, 1986	December 9, 1988	871	Yasuhiro Nakasone
54		Kiichi Miyazawa	July 22, 1986	December 9, 1988	871	Noboru Takeshita
(52)		Noboru Takeshita (Acting)	December 9, 1988	December 27, 1988	18	Noboru Takeshita
(50)		Tatsuo Murayama	December 27, 1988	August 10, 1989	226	Noboru Takeshita
(50)		Tatsuo Murayama	December 27, 1988	August 10, 1989	226	Sosuke Uno
55		Ryutaro Hashimoto	August 10, 1989	October 14, 1991	795	Toshiki Kaifu
-		Toshiki Kaifu (Acting)	October 14, 1991	November 5, 1991	22	Toshiki Kaifu
56		Tsutomu Hata	November 5, 1991	December 12, 1992	403	Kiichi Miyazawa
57		Yoshiro Hayashi	December 12, 1992	August 9, 1993	240	Kiichi Miyazawa
58		Hirohisa Fujii	August 9, 1993	June 30, 1994	325	Morihiro Hosokawa
58		Hirohisa Fujii	August 9, 1993	June 30, 1994	325	Tsutomu Hata
59		Masayoshi Takemura	June 30, 1994	January 11, 1996	560	Tomiichi Murayama
60		Wataru Kubo	January 11, 1996	November 7, 1996	301	Ryutaro Hashimoto
61		Hiroshi Mitsuzuka	November 7, 1996	January 28, 1998	447	Ryutaro Hashimoto
62		Hikaru Matsunaga	January 30, 1998	July 30, 1998	181	Ryutaro Hashimoto
(54)		Kiichi Miyazawa	July 30, 1998	April 26, 2001	1001	Keizo Obuchi
(54)		Kiichi Miyazawa	July 30, 1998	April 26, 2001	1001	Yoshirō Mori
63		Masajuro Shiokawa	April 26, 2001	September 22, 2003	879	Junichiro Koizumi
64		Sadakazu Tanigaki	September 22, 2003	September 26, 2006	1100	Junichiro Koizumi
65		Kōji Omi	September 26, 2006	August 27, 2007	335	Shinzō Abe
66		Fukushiro Nukaga	August 27, 2007	August 2, 2008	341	Shinzō Abe
66		Fukushiro Nukaga	August 27, 2007	August 2, 2008	341	Yasuo Fukuda
67		Bunmei Ibuki	August 2, 2008	September 24, 2008	53	Yasuo Fukuda
68		Shōichi Nakagawa	September 24, 2008	February 18, 2009	147	Tarō Asō
69		Kaoru Yosano	February 18, 2009	September 16, 2009	210	Tarō Asō
(58)		Hirohisa Fujii	September 16, 2009	January 6, 2010	112	Yukio Hatoyama
70		Naoto Kan	January 6, 2010	June 8, 2010	153	Yukio Hatoyama
71		Yoshihiko Noda	June 8, 2010	September 2, 2011	451	Naoto Kan
72		Jun Azumi	September 2, 2011	October 1, 2012	395	Yoshihiko Noda
73		Koriki Jojima	October 1, 2012	December 26, 2012	86	Yoshihiko Noda
74		Tarō Asō	December 26, 2012	October 4, 2021	3204	Shinzō Abe
74		Tarō Asō	December 26, 2012	October 4, 2021	3204	Yoshihide Suga
75		Shun'ichi Suzuki	October 4, 2021	October 1, 2024	1093	Fumio Kishida
76		Katsunobu Katō	October 1, 2024	October 21, 2025	385	Shigeru Ishiba
77		Satsuki Katayama	October 21, 2025	Incumbent	321	Sanae Takaichi
