= Kakuei Tanaka =

Prime Minister of Japan from 1972 to 1974

- 田中 角栄
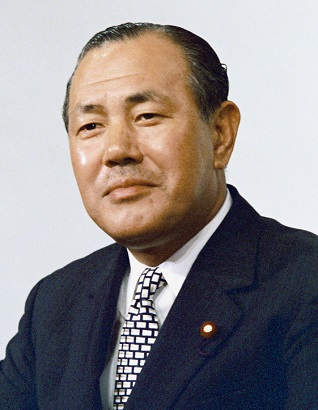
- Official portrait, 1972

Prime Minister of Japan
- In office 7 July 1972 – 9 December 1974
- Monarch: Hirohito
- Deputy: Takeo Miki
- Preceded by: Eisaku Satō
- Succeeded by: Takeo Miki

President of the Liberal Democratic Party
- In office 5 July 1972 – 4 December 1974
- Vice President: Etsusaburo Shiina
- Secretary-General: Tomisaburo Hashimoto; Susumu Nikaidō
- Preceded by: Eisaku Satō
- Succeeded by: Takeo Miki
Ministerial offices
Minister of International Trade and Industry
In office 5 July 1971 – 7 July 1972
Prime Minister	Eisaku Satō
Preceded by	Kiichi Miyazawa
Succeeded by	Yasuhiro Nakasone
Minister of Finance
In office 18 July 1962 – 3 June 1965
Prime Minister	Hayato Ikeda; Eisaku Satō
Preceded by	Mikio Mizuta
Succeeded by	Takeo Fukuda
Minister of Posts and Telecommunications
In office 10 July 1957 – 12 June 1958
Prime Minister	Nobusuke Kishi
Preceded by	Taro Hirai
Succeeded by	Yutaka Terao
Party political offices
Secretary-General of the Liberal Democratic Party
In office November 1968 – June 1971
President	Eisaku Satō
Vice President	Kawashima Shojiro (1968–1970)
Preceded by	Takeo Fukuda
Succeeded by	Shigeru Hori
In office June 1965 – December 1966
President	Eisaku Satō
Vice President	Kawashima Shojiro
Preceded by	Takeo Miki
Succeeded by	Takeo Fukuda

Member of the House of Representatives
- In office 25 April 1947 – 18 February 1990
- Preceded by: Constituency established
- Succeeded by: Yukio Hoshino
- Constituency: Niigata 3rd

Personal details
- Born: 4 May 1918 Kariwa, Niigata, Japan
- Died: 16 December 1993 (aged 75) Shinjuku, Tokyo, Japan
- Party: Liberal Democratic (1955–1993)
- Other political affiliations: JPP (1945–1947); DP (1947); Dōshi Club (1947–1948); DLP (1948–1950); LP (1950–1955)
- Spouse: Hana Sakamoto (m. 1942)
- Children: Masanori Tanaka (by Hana Tanaka, died age 4); Makiko Tanaka (by Hana Tanaka); Kyo Tanaka (by Kazuko Tsuji); Hitoshi Tanaka (by Kazuko Tsuji); Atsuko Sato (by Akiko Sato)
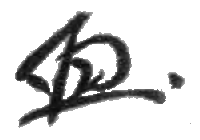
- Signature
- Military career
- Allegiance: Japan
- Branch: Imperial Japanese Army
- Service years: 1939–1941
- Rank: Superior Private
- Conflicts: Second Sino-Japanese War; Second World War

Japanese name
- Shinjitai: 田中 角栄
- Kyūjitai: 田中 角榮
- Kana: たなか かくえい
Transcriptions
- Romanization: Tanaka Kakuei

Kakuei Tanaka (田中 角栄, Tanaka Kakuei; IPA: [ta̠na̠ka̠ ka̠kɯ̟e̞ː]; 4 May 1918 – 16 December 1993) was a Japanese politician who served as prime minister of Japan from 1972 to 1974. Known for his background in construction and earthy and tenacious political style, Tanaka is the only modern Japanese prime minister who did not finish high school or graduate from a university.

Born in Niigata Prefecture to a poor farmer, Tanaka left school at age 14. He later received an engineering education and founded his own construction company in 1936. In 1940, he was drafted into the army and served in Manchuria until 1941; during the Pacific War, he made a fortune from government contracts. After the war, Tanaka was first elected to the National Diet in 1947. He joined the Liberal Democratic Party on its foundation in 1955, and held a series of cabinet positions, including posts as telecommunications minister from 1957 to 1958, finance minister from 1962 to 1965, and international trade and industry minister from 1971 to 1972. He built up a large faction in the party by political maneuvering and extensive use of money.

After a power struggle with Takeo Fukuda, Tanaka succeeded Eisaku Satō as prime minister in 1972. Domestically, he pursued his "Plan to Remodel the Japanese Archipelago", an infrastructure development program, before it was shelved due to inflation and the 1973 oil crisis. In 1972, Tanaka established relations with the People's Republic of China. Although he had entered office with a very high popularity rating, this declined quickly amid allegations of corruption before his resignation in 1974. In 1976, Tanaka was arrested and charged with taking ¥500 million in bribes in the Lockheed scandal, and in 1983 was sentenced to four years in prison. However, Tanaka remained free on appeal to the Supreme Court until his death in 1993.

Throughout his legal problems, he maintained influence through his faction, the largest faction in the LDP, and continued to serve as kingmaker for subsequent premiers, which earned him the nickname "Shadow Shogun" among others. A debilitating stroke he suffered in 1985 led to the collapse of his political faction, with most members regrouping under the leadership of Noboru Takeshita in 1987.

== Early life and education ==
Kakuei Tanaka was born on 4 May 1918, in the village of Futada in the Kariwa District of Niigata Prefecture, now part of Kashiwazaki. He was born to a farming family, the second son of Kakuji Tanaka and his wife Fume. His older brother had died young so Tanaka was treated as the eldest son. He otherwise had six sisters, two elder and four younger. Niigata Prefecture was part of what was called ura Nippon: the "back of Japan" facing the Sea of Japan, which was impoverished and neglected in comparison to omote Nippon, "the front of Japan" facing the Pacific Ocean. Furthermore, Niigata was in the snow country of Japan, where heavy snows made conditions difficult.

Although they were a farming family, Tanaka's grandfather Sutekichi had also been a respected shrine carpenter and Tanaka's father Kakuji worked as a horse and cattle trader. At the time of Tanaka's birth they were considered relatively well-off in Futada, but when business ventures undertaken by Kakuji, notably importing Holstein cattle and koi farming, ended up failing, the family fell into poverty. This was exacerbated by Kakuji's gambling and drinking. To support the family, Tanaka's mother worked in the fields even after everyone else went to sleep, so Tanaka was often taken care of by his grandmother.

Tanaka contracted diphtheria at the age of two and the aftereffects caused him to stutter, but he lost it by practicing his speech by himself for long periods as a child. Tanaka excelled in school, but his family's poverty meant he could not pursue higher education after graduating from higher elementary school at the age of fourteen. Instead, Tanaka found work as a manual laborer, but he later quit this job and went to Tokyo in 1934, hoping to work under the Viscount Masatoshi Ōkōchi, head of the Riken Concern, who had championed the development of rural prefectures like Niigata.

== Career in Tokyo ==
In Tokyo, Tanaka was unable to meet with Ōkōchi. Instead he found work as an apprentice at a construction company while he began attending engineering school part-time in the evenings. He ended up quitting his job after a dispute with his foreman, later working briefly for an insurance industry magazine and a trading company. In 1935 the fortunes of Tanaka's father turned, so Tanaka was able to spend more time on his education. He took courses at a number of schools with the goal of entering Naval Academy, but he later decided to go into the construction industry instead. After finishing engineering school in 1936 he found employment as an engineer at an architectural firm.

In 1937, while running errands for the firm, Tanaka had a chance meeting with the Viscount Masatoshi Ōkōchi in an elevator. Ōkōchi, apparently impressed with Tanaka's energy and ambition, helped the young man start his own architectural firm in Tokyo. (Note: Japan did not have a state qualification for architects at the time; Tanaka would have a role in creating the licensing system for architects later in his career.) The fledgling firm was successful as it received contracts from the Riken Concern, but after only two years Tanaka was drafted into the army and sent to Manchuria, where he served as an enlisted clerk in the 24th Cavalry Regiment, reaching the rank of superior private (jōtōhei) in March 1940. He contracted pneumonia and pleurisy and was sent to military hospital in Japan in February 1941; he was discharged in October 1941.

After recovering, Tanaka found office space at the Sakamoto Construction Company and restarted his business. His landlady, the late company president's widow, was trying to find a match for her daughter, Hana Sakamoto, so Tanaka married Hana in March 1942. She was seven years Tanaka’s senior and had a daughter from a previous marriage. They soon had two children of their own: a son named Masanori in 1942, who died young in 1947, and a daughter named Makiko in 1944.

The marriage allowed Tanaka to take control of Sakamoto Construction, which he merged with his own business to form the Tanaka Construction Company in 1943. Tanaka revived his relationship with Riken, serving regularly as a subcontractor. In the midst of the Pacific War, Riken and Tanaka Construction received many government contracts for military facilities and factories. Luck favored Tanaka in the endgame of the war. Tanaka received a particularly profitable contract to relocate a piston ring factory from Tokyo to Daejeon in Korea. The rebuilding in Korea had just begun by the time it was abandoned due to the surrender of Japan, but Tanaka had been able to go to cash in his advance on the contract, ¥15 million in Japanese war bonds, at a bank in Seoul before it became worthless. In addition, none of his major buildings were damaged in the firebombing of Tokyo.

== Political career ==
=== Rise into politics ===
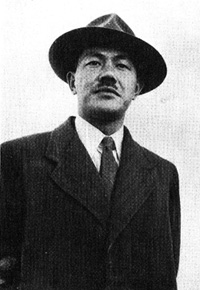
Tanaka in 1951

In November 1945, Tanaka met with Tadao Oasa, a veteran politician who served as adviser to the Tanaka Construction Company. Oasa was in the middle of forming the Japan Progressive Party (日本進歩党, Nihon Shinpoto) and asked Tanaka to contribute money, which he happily did. Oasa later recruited Tanaka as a candidate for the party in Niigata Prefecture for the first postwar election in April 1946.

During this first bid for a Diet seat, Tanaka relied on local political notables and associates from Riken to support his campaign. He worked around the election laws of the time by opening a branch office in Kashiwazaki and placing large "Tanaka" sign on the building to gain name recognition. However, his bid unraveled as three of the notables supposed to support him ran as candidates themselves, as did the brother of the Riken Kashiwazaki factory manager, splitting Tanaka's support base. Tanaka only captured 4% of the vote, finishing in eleventh place whereas the district was filling eight seats.

Tanaka was better prepared for the next election, which came in April 1947. He had set up Tanaka Construction branch offices in Kashiwazaki and Nagaoka, employing a hundred people who would assist him in the campaign. Tanaka targeted rural voters; he became known for his diligence in visiting remote villages. He was elected in third place out of five seats. He took his Diet seat as a member of the new Democratic Party (民主党, Minshuto). In the Diet, he became friends with former prime minister Kijūrō Shidehara and joined Shidehara's Dōshi Club. Then in 1948, the Doshi Club defected to the new Democratic Liberal Party, and Tanaka instantly won favor with the DLP's leader, Shigeru Yoshida. Yoshida appointed Tanaka as a Vice Minister of Justice, the youngest in the nation's history.

Then, on 13 December, Tanaka was arrested and imprisoned on charges of accepting ¥1m (US$13,000) in bribes from coal mining interests in Kyūshū. Yoshida and the DLP dropped most of their ties with Tanaka, removed him from his official party posts, and refused to fund his next re-election bid. Despite this, Tanaka announced his candidacy for the 1949 general election, and was released from prison in January after securing bail. He was re-elected, and made a deal with Chief Cabinet Secretary Eisaku Satō to resign his vice-ministerial post in exchange for continued membership in the DLP.

The Tokyo District Court found Tanaka guilty in 1950, and Tanaka responded by filing an appeal. In the meantime, he took over the failing Nagaoka Railway that linked Niigata to Tokyo, and through a combination of good management and good luck, brought it back into operation in 1951. In that year's election, he was re-elected to the Diet in a landslide victory, and many of the railroad's employees came out to campaign for him. That year's election was also the first in which he was supported by billionaire capitalist Kenji Osano, who would remain one of Tanaka's most loyal supporters to the end.

=== Etsuzankai ===
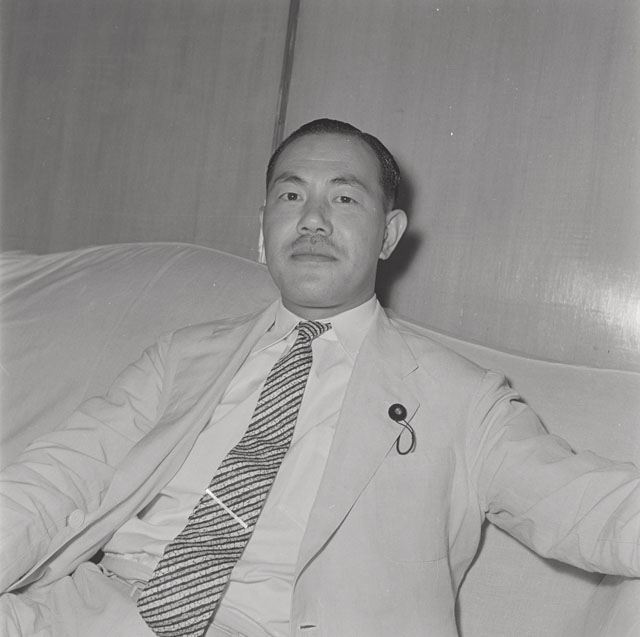
Kakuei Tanaka in October 1954

Tanaka's most important support base, however, was a group called Etsuzankai (越山会, literally "Niigata Mountain Association"). Etsuzankai's function was to screen various petitions from villagers in rural parts of Niigata. Tanaka would answer these petitions with government-funded pork barrel projects. In turn, the local villagers all financially supported Etsuzankai, which, in its turn, funded the re-election campaigns of local Diet members, including Tanaka. At its peak, Etsuzankai had 100,000 members.

The projects funded by Etsuzankai included the Tadami River hydroelectric power project, the New Shimizu Tunnel, and, perhaps most infamously, the Jōetsu Shinkansen high-speed rail line.

During the 1950s, Tanaka brought Etsuzankai members to his residence in Tokyo by bus, met with each of them individually, and then provided them with tours of the Diet and Imperial Palace. This practice made Etsuzankai the most tightly knit political organization in Japanese history, and it also furthered Tanaka's increasingly gangster-like image.

=== Consolidation of power ===
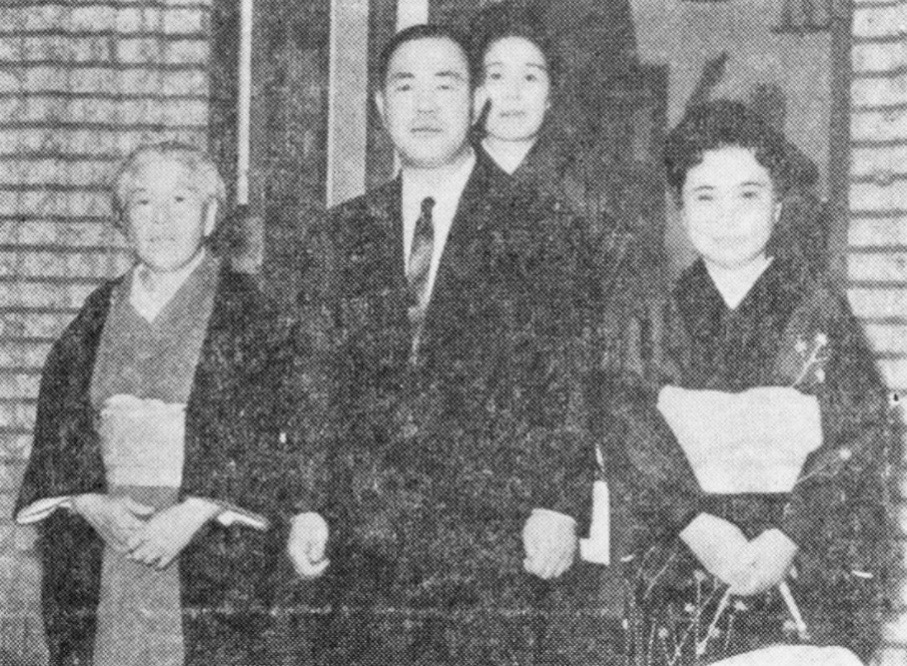
Kakuei Tanaka following his appointment as Minister of Finance with his mother, Fume and his wife, Hana on 18 July 1962.

Tanaka became a member of the Liberal Democratic Party when it formed in November 1955, from the merger of the Liberal Party and the Democratic Party. In November 1956 there was a party leadership race to succeed Ichirō Hatoyama. A split occurred in the Yoshida school between the factions of Eisaku Sato and Hayato Ikeda; Sato supported his brother Nobusuke Kishi and Ikeda supported Mitsujirō Ishii. Tanaka followed Sato rather than Ikeda, even though Tanaka’s stepdaughter married a nephew of Ikeda that same month. Nevertheless, Tanaka maintained ties with Ikeda and befriended his right-hand man Masayoshi Ōhira.

Nobusuke Kishi narrowly lost to Tanzan Ishibashi, but Ishibashi soon fell ill, so Kishi succeeded him in March 1957. When Kishi reshuffled the cabinet in July, Tanaka received his first cabinet post, Minister of Posts and Telecommunications. In this role, he granted the first television broadcasting licenses in Japan. Tanaka was a friend of the commissioned postal system, by which local notables were commissioned by the state to serve as local postmasters. Under his tenure, Tanaka forged a strong relationship between the postmasters and the young LDP, and the postmasters would serve as important supporters for the party. Tanaka left cabinet in June 1958. He was appointed deputy secretary-general of the LDP in June 1959. Around this time, Tanaka came to be regarded as one of the "five commissioners of the Sato faction," along with Shigeru Hori, Kiichi Aichi, Tomisaburo Hashimoto and Raizo Matsuno: the principal executives who managed the faction of Eisaku Sato.

After the resignation of Nobusuke Kishi, Tanaka supported Hayato Ikeda as his successor. Under Ikeda, Tanaka became chairman of the Policy Research Council, and eventually Minister of Finance. Tanaka's term as minister of finance saw some of the highest economic growth in Japanese history.

In October 1960, following the assassination of Japan Socialist Party chairman Inejirō Asanuma, Tanaka went to pay his respects despite their opposing party affiliations. According to a later recollection by his son, Kyō Tanaka, Tanaka was at the family's home in Kagurazaka when he heard of Asanuma's assassination and prepared to leave. When his son, then a third-grade elementary school student, remarked that Asanuma was a Socialist and therefore his father's political enemy, Tanaka reportedly replied: 「馬鹿野郎！たとえ社会党でも、国を良くしようと考える同士だ！俺が行かなくて、どうする！」 ("You idiot! Even if he was a Socialist, he was someone who wanted to make the country better! How could I not go?"). The anecdote was reported from an interview with Kyō Tanaka published in Bessatsu Takarajima.

Satō succeeded Ikeda in 1964. When Satō reshuffled the cabinet and party leadership in June 1965, Tanaka was appointed Secretary-General of the Liberal Democratic Party. His tenure saw the emergence of a number of corruption scandals involving LDP Diet members, collectively known as the Black Mist Scandal. Although Tanaka himself was not implicated, Satō replaced him with Takeo Fukuda in December 1966. Tanaka was given a low-profile position as chairman of the LDP Urban Policy Research Commission.

Fukuda and Tanaka soon became the two battling heirs of the Satō administration, and their rivalry was dubbed the "Kaku-Fuku War" by the Japanese press. Tanaka made a record showing in the 1967 general election, and Satō re-appointed him as secretary general in November 1968, moving Fukuda to the post of finance minister. In 1971, Satō gave Tanaka another important stepping stone to taking over the government: minister of international trade and industry. In this position, Tanaka gained public support again by standing up to U.S. negotiators who wanted Japan to impose export caps on several products.

In June 1972, he had published his book, "A Plan for Remodeling the Japanese Archipelago." He made a de facto government pledge with the purpose of "promoting regional decentralization". This book initially sold 910,000 copies, partly because Tanaka took the position of prime minister, and was ranked fourth in the year. It became a bestseller.

=== 1972 LDP presidential election ===
Eisaku Sato announced his intention to resign on 17 June 1972. Sato hoped to be succeeded by Takeo Fukuda, but Tanaka had already won the loyalty of most of the Sato faction; on the previous month Tomisaburo Hashimoto and Takeo Kimura organised a meeting of 81 diet members from the Sato faction who pledged to support Tanaka. This was the birth of the Tanaka faction.

Besides Fukuda and Tanaka, Masayoshi Ohira, Takeo Miki and Yasuhiro Nakasone were also expected to seek the LDP presidency, but Nakasone dropped out and endorsed Tanaka. Tanaka then formed an agreement with Ohira and Miki to support each other in a runoff against Fukuda. As a result Tanaka defeated Fukuda in the election in July, becoming LDP president and prime minister.

== Premiership (1972–1974) ==
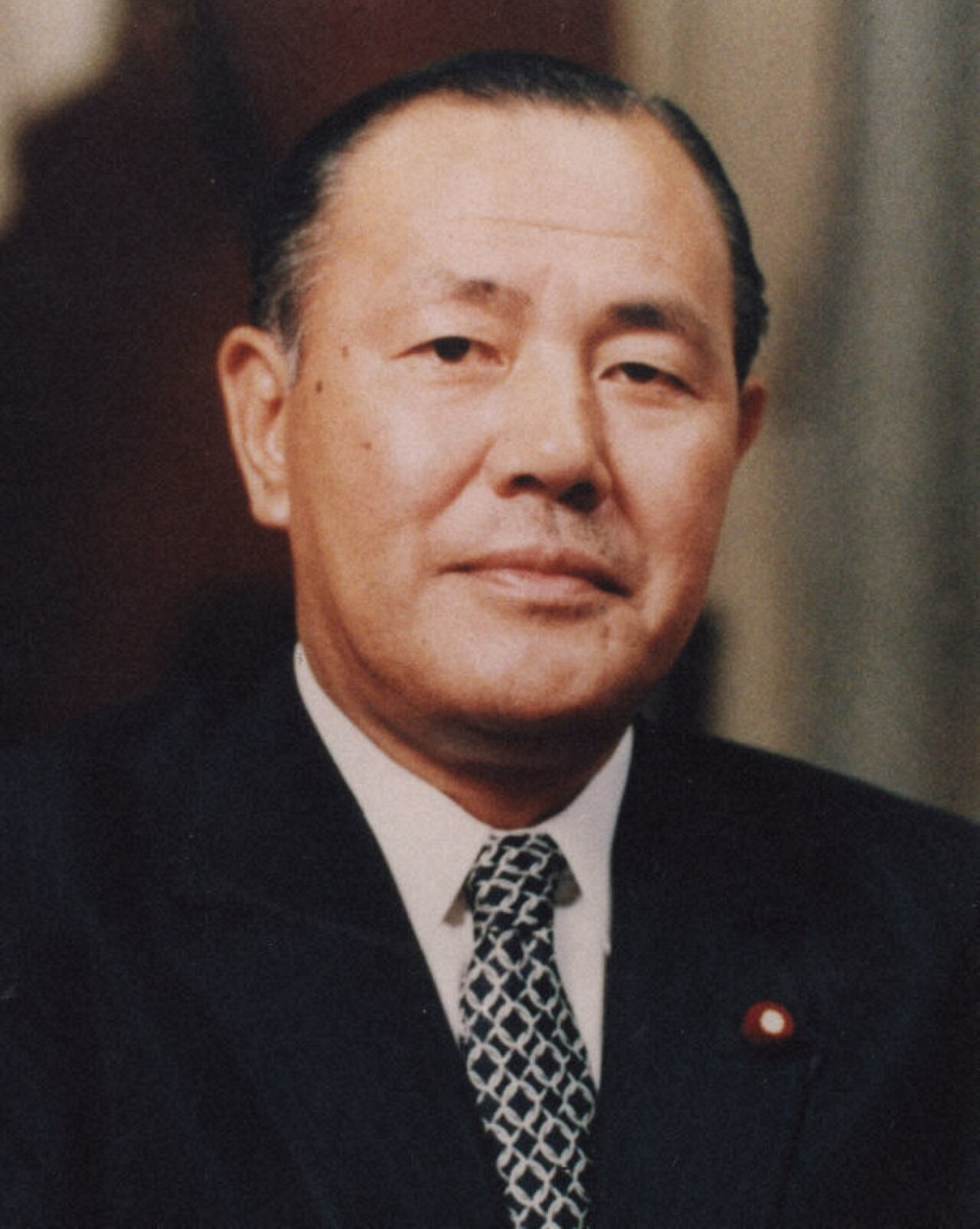
Official portrait, 1972

Tanaka entered the office with the highest popularity rating of any new premier in Japanese history. Tanaka brought in his those who had helped ensure his election in the cabinet: Miki as deputy prime minister, Ohira as foreign minister and Nakasone as minister of international trade and industry.

=== Foreign policy ===
One of Tanaka's most remembered achievements is normalizing Japanese relations with the People's Republic of China, which occurred around the same time as Richard Nixon's efforts to do the same for Chinese relations with the United States. In 1972, Tanaka met with Chinese premier Zhou Enlai to discuss the normalization of relations between the two countries. Among other matters, they discussed the Senkaku Islands, which would later become a major point of contention between the two countries. Tanaka reportedly asked Zhou "What is your view on the Senkaku Islands? Some people say things about them to me," to which Zhou replied "I do not want to talk about it this time. If there wasn't oil, neither Taiwan nor the United States would make this an issue." Just two months after taking office, Tanaka met Chinese Communist Party chairman Mao Zedong.

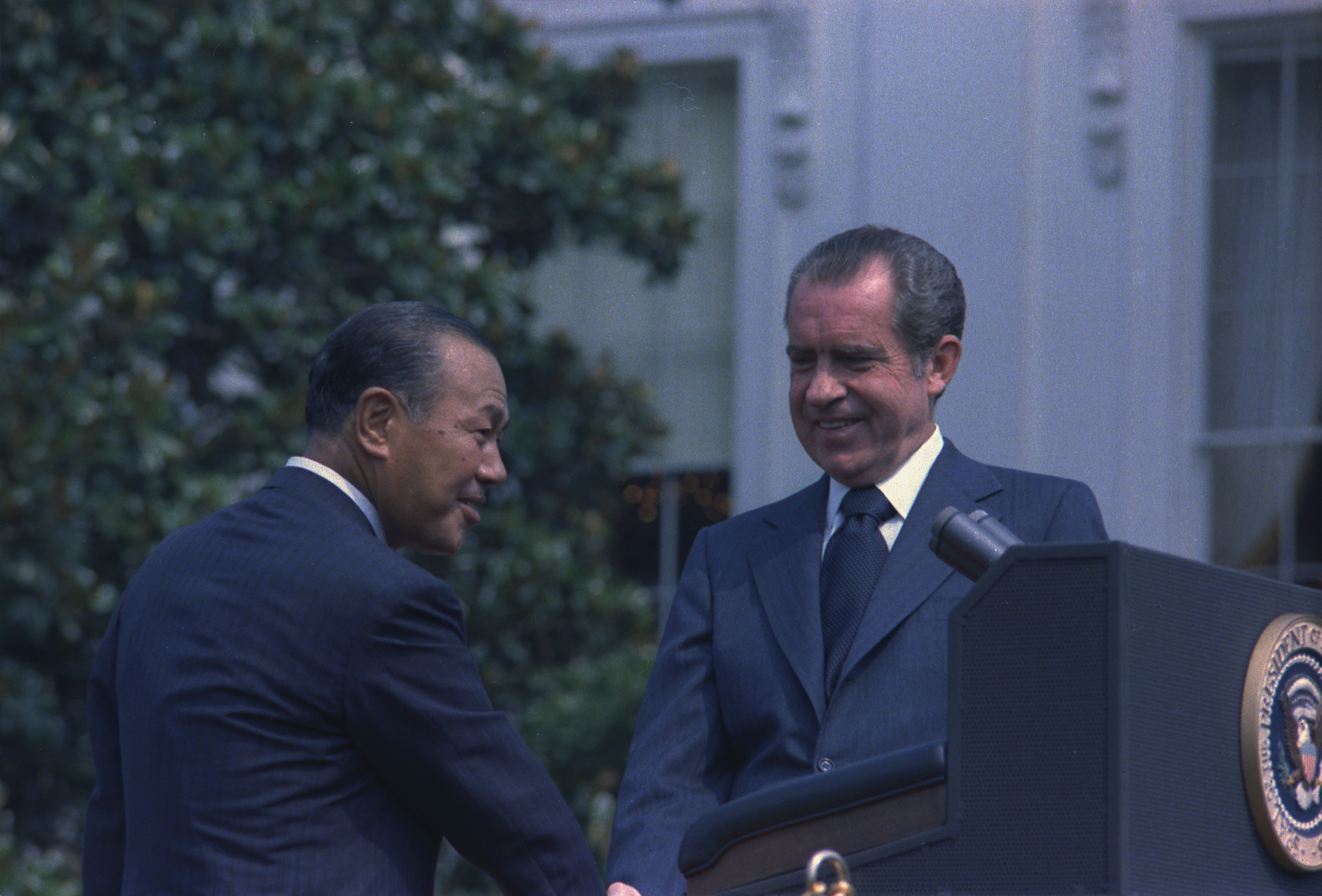
Prime Minister Kakuei Tanaka with U.S. President Richard Nixon at the White House, Washington, D.C., on July 1973

During 1973 and 1974, Tanaka visited the United States, France, Britain, West Germany, Italy, the Soviet Union, the Philippines, Thailand, Singapore, Malaysia and Indonesia. He appeared on the US television program Meet the Press to have a direct dialogue with Americans during his visit to the US in July/August 1973. His visit to Europe was the first visit by a Japanese prime minister since 1962, and his visit to the USSR was the first since 1956.

His state visit to Indonesia as invited by President Soeharto to discuss Indo-Japanese trade relations was protested by a number of local anti-Japanese sentiments denying international investment, which occurred on 15 January 1974. Japanese-manufactured material and buildings were destroyed by Indonesian protesters. 11 people were dead, a further 300 were injured, and 775 protesters were arrested. As a result, the Soeharto regime dissolved the president's private counselor constitution and took control of the national security leadership. The incident henceforth became well known as the Malari Incident (Peristiwa Malari).

=== Economic policy ===
Upon taking office in 1972, Tanaka published an ambitious infrastructure plan for Japan which called for a new network of expressways and high-speed rail lines throughout the country. It was a plan that Tanaka once wrote in his book "Theory of Remodeling the Japanese Islands". He envisioned moving more economic functions to secondary cities with populations in the 300,000–400,000 range, and linking these cities to Tokyo, Osaka and other cores by high-speed rail, a revolutionary view at a time when only one Shinkansen line existed.

Tanaka's government expanded the welfare state through measures such as the doubling of national pension benefits, the introduction of free medical care for the elderly, the provision of child allowances in 1972, and the indexation of pensions to the rate of inflation in 1973. In 1973, the Pollution Health Damage Compensation Law was passed with the purpose of paying victims of specific diseases in certain Government-designated localities compensation benefits and medical expenses, together with providing health and welfare services required by these families.

The Japanese economy, and thus Tanaka's popularity, was severely hurt by the inflationary effects of the 1973 oil crisis.

=== Resignation ===
In October 1974, the popular Bungeishunjū magazine published an article detailing how businesspeople close to Tanaka had profited by setting up paper companies to purchase land in remote areas immediately prior to the announcement of public works projects nearby. Although this implied a degree of corruption, none of the activity detailed was actually illegal.

The article inspired Tanaka's LDP rivals to open a public inquiry in the Diet (among other things, Tanaka had approached a geisha and used her name for a number of shady land deals in Tokyo during the mid-sixties). The Diet commission called Etsuzankai's treasurer, Aki Sato, as its first witness. Unknown to the committee members, Sato and Tanaka had been involved in a romantic relationship for several years, and Tanaka took pity on Sato's troubled upbringing. Rather than let her take the stand, he announced his resignation on 26 November 1974. The announcement was read by Chief Cabinet Secretary Noboru Takeshita.

The Tanaka faction supported Takeo Miki's "clean government" bid to become prime minister, and Tanaka once again became a rank-and-file Diet member.

== Lockheed scandal and aftermath ==
On 6 February 1976, the vice chairman of the Lockheed Corporation told a United States Senate subcommittee that Tanaka had accepted $1.8 million in bribes through the trading company Marubeni during his term as prime minister, in return for having All Nippon Airways purchase 21 Lockheed L-1011 aircraft in 1972. Although Henry Kissinger tried to stop the details from making their way to the Japanese government, fearing that it would harm the two countries' security relationship, Miki pushed a bill through the Diet that requested information from the Senate. Tanaka was arrested on 27 July 1976, initially on charges of violating Japanese foreign exchange restrictions by not reporting the payment. He was released in August on a ¥200m (US$690,000) bond. Tanaka was located in the Tokyo Detention House. Many Tanaka supporters viewed the scandal as an effort by American multinational corporations to "get" Tanaka in response to his hard-line stance in trade talks with the United States, based on the fact that the scandal originated with congressional testimony in the US.

Tanaka's trial did not end his political influence. His faction had 70 to 80 members prior to his arrest in 1976, but grew to over 150 members by 1981, more than one-third of the total LDP representation in the Diet. In retaliation for Miki's actions, Tanaka persuaded his faction to vote for Fukuda in the 1976 "Lockheed Election". The two old rivals did not cooperate for long, however: in 1978, Tanaka threw his faction behind Ohira's. After Ohira died in 1980, the Tanaka faction elected Zenkō Suzuki. In 1982, Yasuhiro Nakasone was elected president of the LDP (and therefore as prime minister) amid allegations from opponents that he would be under Tanaka's control.

The Lockheed trial ended on 12 October 1983. Tanaka was found guilty and sentenced to 4 years in jail and a 500 million yen fine. Rather than cave in, he filed an appeal and announced that he would not leave the Diet as long as his constituents supported him. This sparked a month-long war in the Diet over whether or not to censure Tanaka; eventually, Prime Minister Nakasone, himself elected by Tanaka's faction, dissolved the Diet and called for a new election, stating that "in view of the current unusual parliamentary situation, there is a need for refreshing the people's minds as quickly as possible."

In the "Second Lockheed Election" of December 1983, Tanaka retained his Diet seat by an unprecedented margin, winning more votes than any other candidate in the country. The LDP performed poorly, and Prime Minister Nakasone publicly vowed to distance the party from Tanaka's politics, stating that the party should be "cleansed" with a new code of ethics. Nakasone placed six members of the Tanaka faction on his 1984 cabinet, including future prime minister Noboru Takeshita.

=== Defections to the Takeshita faction ===
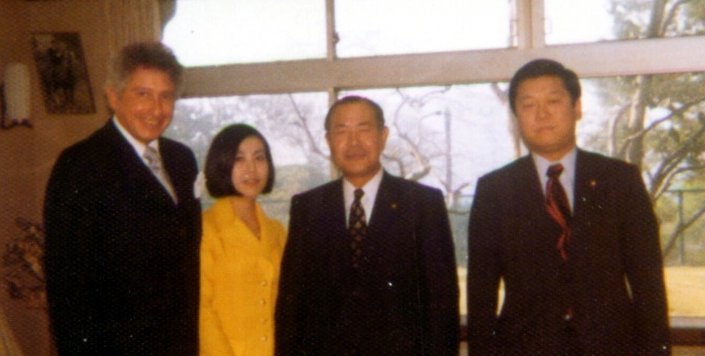
Tanaka (third from left) with American scientist Stanford R. Ovshinsky and his political disciple Ichirō Ozawa

Amid Tanaka's objections, Noboru Takeshita formed a "study group" called Soseikai on 7 February 1985, which counted among its ranks 43 of the 121 Tanaka faction members. Weeks after this defection, Tanaka suffered a stroke on 27 February and became hospitalized, sparking uncertainty over the future of his faction. His daughter Makiko spirited him from the hospital after authorities refused to give the former prime minister an entire floor, and the Diet session halted entirely while details of Tanaka's condition leaked out to the press. Susumu Nikaido, the titular chairman of Tanaka's faction, mounted a campaign against Takeshita to attempt to win over members of Tanaka's faction amid uncertainty as to his condition, which was only known to Tanaka's family and doctors. The division in the Tanaka faction was a boon for smaller LDP faction leaders, particularly Prime Minister Nakasone who no longer had to worry about a single dominant force within the LDP. Public chiding of Tanaka continued during 1985, including Sega's publication of an arcade game titled Gombe's I'm Sorry (ごんべえのあいむそ〜り〜, Gonbē no Aimusōrī) featuring a caricature of Tanaka dodging various celebrities in a quest to collect gold bars and grow wealthy, with the title punning on the Japanese term for "prime minister", Sōri (総理).

Tanaka remained in convalescence through the election of 1986, where he retained his Diet seat. On New Year's Day of 1987, he made his first public appearance since the stroke, and was clearly in poor condition: half of his face was paralyzed, and he was grossly overweight. The Tokyo High Court dismissed Tanaka's appeal on 29 July 1987, and the original sentence passed down in 1983 was reinstated. Tanaka immediately posted bail and appealed to the Supreme Court.

Meanwhile, despite Nikaido's efforts, by July 1987 the Takeshita faction counted 113 of the 143 Tanaka faction members, while only thirteen supported Nikaido. The Tanaka faction members who moved to Takeshita's faction included Ichirō Ozawa, Tsutomu Hata, Ryutaro Hashimoto, Keizō Obuchi and Kozo Watanabe. Takeshita won the LDP leadership election in November 1987 and served as prime minister until resigning amid the Recruit scandal in June 1989.

== Retirement and death ==
While his appeal lingered in the Court's docket, Tanaka's medical condition deteriorated. He announced his retirement from politics in October 1989, at the age of 71, in an announcement made by his son-in-law Naoki Tanaka. The announcement ended his 42-year career in politics; the remnants of his faction, now led by former Prime Minister Takeshita, remained the most powerful bloc within the LDP at the time of his retirement. In 1993, a number of members of his faction broke away from the LDP to form part of an Eight-party Alliance government under Morihiro Hosokawa.

Tanaka was later diagnosed with diabetes, and died of pneumonia at Keio University Hospital at 2:04 p.m. on 16 December 1993. Following his death, his home in northern Tokyo was "besieged" by supporters and journalists.

== Legacy ==
Tanaka's faction remained within the Liberal Democratic Party even after his death. It split in 1992, after Noboru Takeshita was sidelined by the Recruit scandal, with Tsutomu Hata and Ichiro Ozawa leaving the LDP and forming the Japan Renewal Party. Keizo Obuchi inherited what was left of the Tanaka faction, supported the election of Ryutaro Hashimoto as prime minister, and himself became prime minister from 1999 to 2000. After Obuchi's death, Hashimoto led the faction until refusing to stand in the 2005 general election due to a fundraising scandal, and died shortly thereafter. The remnants of the faction, formally known by this time as Heisei Kenkyūkai (Heisei Research Council), remained active under the leadership of Yūji Tsushima, who resigned prior to the 2009 general election, passing control to Fukushiro Nukaga. The faction raised much less in donations during the 1990s and 2000s than it did under Tanaka and Takeshita in the 1980s, as electoral reforms enacted in 1994, coupled with new campaign finance regulations and the ongoing economic slump that followed the Japanese asset price bubble, weakened the power of factions in Japanese politics.

Tanaka built his faction largely by recruiting and supporting new candidates. This technique was used to some success by two prominent politicians decades later: Junichiro Koizumi, who recruited a large number of new LDP representatives dubbed "Koizumi Children" in the 2005 election, and Ichiro Ozawa, who did the same for the Democratic Party of Japan in the 2009 election. However, neither the "Koizumi Children" nor the "Ozawa Children" showed the same degree of loyalty as the Tanaka faction, with many "Koizumi Children" voting against Koizumi's reform agenda, and many "Ozawa Children" voting against Ozawa in his 2010 bid for the DPJ presidency.

Makiko Tanaka, who was not associated with Etsuzankai, was elected to her father's old seat in Niigata in the 1993 election and became foreign minister in the Koizumi cabinet in 2001. Due in part to her father's historical role in Sino-Japanese relations, she became popular in the People's Republic of China and publicly opposed several anti-PRC actions by Japan and the United States, including Koizumi's visits to Yasukuni Shrine. She left the LDP in 2002 and subsequently became a minister in the last days of Democratic Party of Japan government in 2012. She lost her seat in the December 2012 general election, by which point Etsuzankai had disbanded with only a few elderly surviving members.

In January 2024, the Mejiro Goten, Tanaka's former Tokyo residence, burned down. Makiko Tanaka ascribed the fire to an incense stick that had not been extinguished in the Buddhist family altar. The former LDP Secretary General and future prime minister Shigeru Ishiba, one of Tanaka's proteges, commented: "The residence represented the pinnacle of Tanaka’s power. Another such place will never emerge. The symbol of that time has disappeared."

As of 2017, there was nostalgia for Kakuei Tanaka.

== Political philosophy, ideology and views ==
Tankara supported a business-backed capitalist oriented party. He advocated for a classical free-enterprises system with a welfare state and regulation of the national economy. His economics were later described as "Neither Keynesian nor Milton Friedmanian but Schumpeterian". While not Keynesian, his government was public-oriented and supported a bigger welfare state, which can be seen in his support of public spending or the free medical care for the elderly. He also embraced "pragmatic conservatism", as well as "high-modernism", which is seen as populist and technocratic.

== Honours ==
=== Foreign honours ===
- Philippines:
  - Grand Collar of the Order of Sikatuna

== See also ==
- I'm Sorry (video game)
- Malari incident

House of Representatives (Japan)
New office	Chair, Committee on Commerce and Industry of the House of Representatives of Japan; 1955	Succeeded by Hiroshi Kanda
Political offices
Preceded by Taro Hirai	Minister of Posts and Telecommunications; 1957–1958	Succeeded by Yutaka Terao
Preceded by Mikio Mizuta	Minister of Finance; 1962–1965	Succeeded by Takeo Fukuda
Preceded by Kiichi Miyazawa	Minister of International Trade and Industry; 1971–1972	Succeeded by Yasuhiro Nakasone
Preceded by Eisaku Satō	Prime Minister of Japan; 1972–1974	Succeeded by Takeo Miki
Party political offices
Preceded by Takeo Fukuda	Chair, Policy Research Committee of the Liberal Democratic Party; 1961–1962	Succeeded by Okinori Kaya
Preceded by Takeo Miki	Secretary-General of the Liberal Democratic Party; 1965–1966	Succeeded by Takeo Fukuda
Preceded by Takeo Fukuda	Secretary-General of the Liberal Democratic Party; 1968–1971	Succeeded by Shigeru Hori
Preceded by Eisaku Satō	President of the Liberal Democratic Party; 1972–1974	Succeeded by Takeo Miki
