= Hayato Ikeda =

Prime Minister of Japan from 1960 to 1964

- 池田 勇人
- Ikeda in 1961

Prime Minister of Japan
- In office 19 July 1960 – 9 November 1964
- Monarch: Hirohito
- Preceded by: Nobusuke Kishi
- Succeeded by: Eisaku Satō
Ministerial offices
Minister of International Trade and Industry
In office 18 June 1959 – 19 July 1960
Prime Minister	Nobusuke Kishi
Preceded by	Tatsunosuke Takasaki
Succeeded by	Mitsujirō Ishii
In office 30 October 1952 – 29 November 1952
Prime Minister	Shigeru Yoshida
Preceded by	Ryūtarō Takahashi
Succeeded by	Sankurō Ogasawara
In office 17 February 1950 – 11 April 1950
Prime Minister	Shigeru Yoshida
Preceded by	Heitarō Inagaki
Succeeded by	Sōtarō Takase
Minister of Finance
In office 23 December 1956 – 10 July 1957
Prime Minister	Tanzan Ishibashi
Preceded by	Hisato Ichimada
Succeeded by	Hisato Ichimada
In office 16 February 1949 – 30 October 1952
Prime Minister	Shigeru Yoshida
Preceded by	Shinzō Ōya (acting)
Succeeded by	Tadaharu Mukai
Director-General of the Economic Deliberation Agency
In office 30 October 1952 – 29 November 1952
Prime Minister	Shigeru Yoshida
Preceded by	Takeshi Yamazaki
Succeeded by	Sankurō Ogasawara

President of the Liberal Democratic Party
- In office 14 July 1960 – 1 December 1964
- Vice President: Banboku Ōno; Shojiro Kawashima
- Secretary-General: Shūji Masutani; Shigesaburō Maeo
- Preceded by: Nobusuke Kishi
- Succeeded by: Eisaku Satō

Member of the House of Representatives
- In office 23 January 1949 – 13 August 1965
- Preceded by: Kiyo Takeda
- Succeeded by: Hiroyuki Masuoka
- Constituency: Hiroshima 2nd

Personal details
- Born: 3 December 1899 Takehara, Hiroshima, Japan
- Died: 13 August 1965 (aged 65) Bunkyō, Tokyo, Japan
- Party: LDP (1955–1965)
- Other political affiliations: DLP (1948–1950); LP (1950–1955)
- Spouse(s): Naoko Hirosawa (m. 1927; died 1932) Mitsue Onuki (after 1932)
- Relatives: Yukihiko Ikeda (son-in-law)
- Education: Kyoto Imperial University
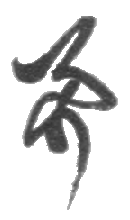
- Signature

Hayato Ikeda (池田 勇人, Ikeda Hayato; 3 December 1899 – 13 August 1965) was a Japanese politician who served as prime minister of Japan from 1960 to 1964. He is best known for his Income Doubling Plan, which promised to double the size of Japan's economy in 10 years, and for presiding over the 1964 Tokyo Olympics.

Born in Hiroshima Prefecture, Ikeda studied law at Kyoto Imperial University and entered the Ministry of Finance in 1925, working there for the next two decades. After the war, he was first elected to the National Diet in 1947 and served as finance minister from 1949 to 1952 under Shigeru Yoshida, being responsible implementing an economic stabilization program. Ikeda briefly headed the Ministry of International Trade and Industry in 1952, but resigned after a no-confidence motion. He returned as finance minister under Tanzan Ishibashi from 1956 to 1957, and as international trade and industry minister from 1959 to 1960.

Ikeda succeeded Nobusuke Kishi as president of the Liberal Democratic Party (LDP) and prime minister in 1960, following Kishi's resignation amid the massive Anpo protests against the US-Japan Security Treaty. Seeking to redirect the nation's energies away from social conflict and in the direction of economic growth, Ikeda announced his Income Doubling Plan and helped Japan to double its GDP in a period of just seven years. During his tenure, Ikeda worked to repair the rift in U.S.–Japan relations and to ease the domestic political divisions which had been exacerbated by the recent protests, played an important role in settling the Miike Struggle, and oversaw the successful 1964 Olympic Games before resigning due to ill health.

== Early life ==
Ikeda was born on 3 December 1899, in Yoshina, Hiroshima Prefecture (present-day Takehara, Hiroshima), the youngest child of Goichirō Ikeda and his wife Ume. He had six siblings.

He attended Kyoto Imperial University and joined the Ministry of Finance following graduation in 1925. While at the ministry, he served as the head of the local tax offices in Hakodate and Utsunomiya. During his time in the latter role, in 1929, he contracted pemphigus foliaceus and went on sick leave for two years, formally resigning in 1931 once his sick leave had run out. The condition was cured by 1934. He briefly considered accepting a position at Hitachi, but returned to the Ministry of Finance in December 1934 to head a tax office in Osaka. Ikeda remained within the ministry through the end of World War II, eventually becoming Vice Minister of Finance under Prime Minister Shigeru Yoshida in 1947.

== Entry into politics ==
Ikeda resigned from the Ministry of Finance in 1948 and won a seat in the House of Representatives, representing a portion of Hiroshima Prefecture, in the general election of 23 January 1949. He was a part of the liberal group that established the Democratic Liberal Party, a forerunner of the current Liberal Democratic Party. Along with Eisaku Satō, Ikeda was an understudy of Shigeru Yoshida early in his career, and was called an "honor student" for his commitment to the ideas presented in the Yoshida Doctrine, although he was a strong personality himself.

He was appointed Minister of Finance on 16 February 1949 by Prime Minister Shigeru Yoshida, and on 7 March announced the Dodge Line monetary policy with American occupation advisor Joseph Dodge. He visited the United States in 1950 to begin preparations for U.S.–Japan security cooperation following the end of the occupation. In 1951, he oversaw the formation of the Development Bank of Japan and Japan Bank for International Cooperation.

In the 1950s, Ikeda developed a reputation as a distant and haughty technocrat unsympathetic to the concerns of ordinary people following a series of verbal gaffes. In a December 1950 Upper House Budget Committee meeting, for example, Ikeda suggested that poor people should eat more barley, rather than expensive white rice. This was reported in the press as "Let the poor eat barley!" Ikeda then became Minister of International Trade and Industry following a cabinet reshuffle in 1952, but was forced to resign less than one month later after he was reported to have said in the Diet, in reference to efforts to curb rampant inflation, "even if five or ten small businessmen commit suicide, it can't be helped." Nevertheless, Ikeda remained a senior LDP lawmaker in various party posts, and returned to the Cabinet as Minister of Finance in December 1956. He then became minister without portfolio in June 1958, and Minister of International Trade and Industry in June 1959.

== Prime Minister of Japan ==
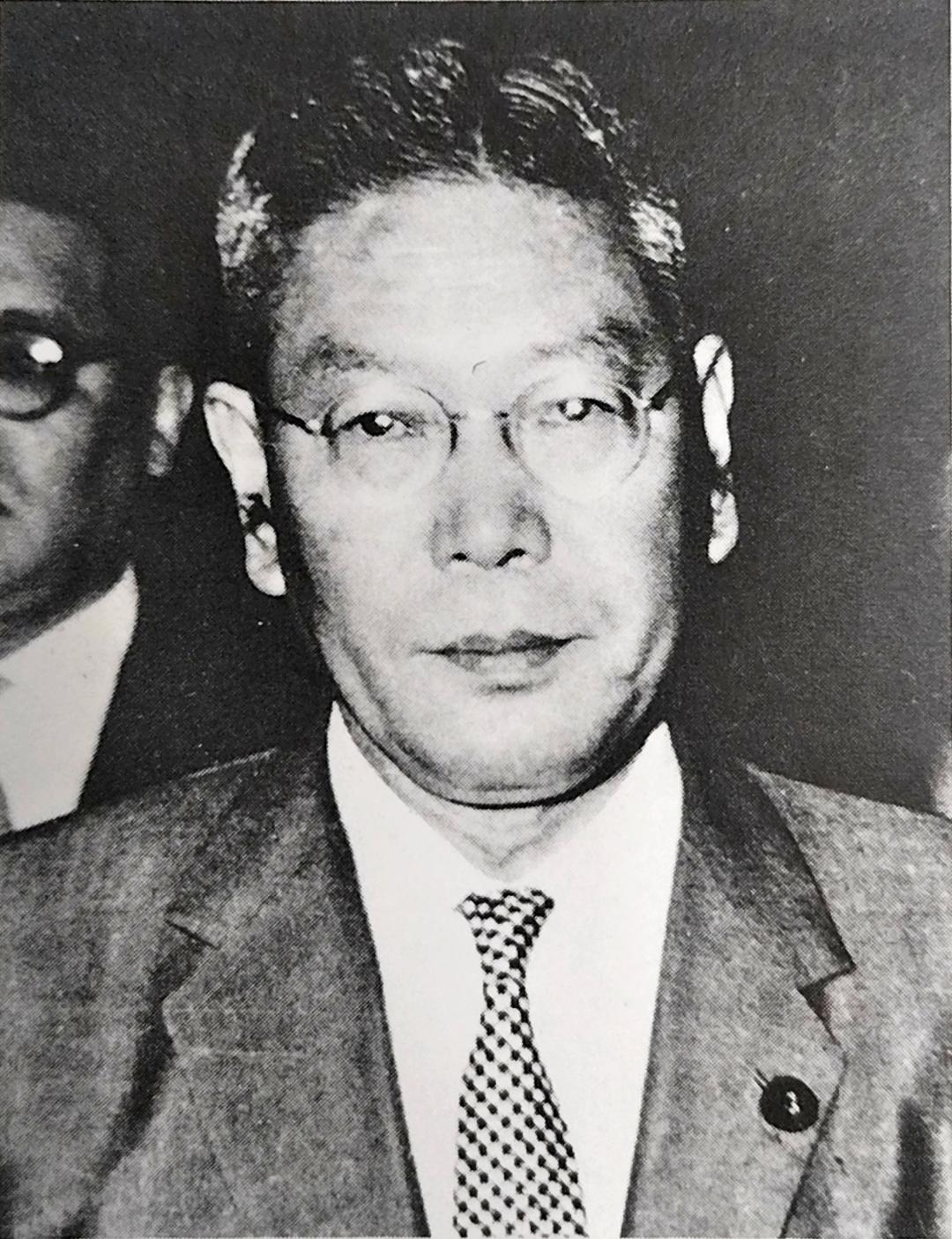
- Ikeda in 1960
- Premiership of Hayato Ikeda; 19 July 1960 – 9 November 1964
- Monarch: Emperor Shōwa
- Cabinet: First Ikeda Cabinet; Second Ikeda Cabinet; Third Ikeda Cabinet
- Party: Liberal Democratic
- Election: 1960; 1963
- Seat: Naikaku Sōri Daijin Kantei
- Constituency: Hiroshima 2nd
- Emblem of the Prime Minister

Ikeda was elected president of the LDP and became Prime Minister in July 1960, at an extremely difficult moment in Japanese domestic politics and U.S.-Japan relations. Ikeda's immediate predecessor as prime minister, Nobusuke Kishi, had disastrously mishandled his attempt to revise the U.S.-Japan Security Treaty (known as Anpo in Japanese), leading to the massive 1960 Anpo protests, which were the largest protests in Japan's modern history. Although Kishi was ultimately successful in ramming the revised treaty through the Diet, the size and violence of the protests that followed forced him to cancel a planned visit by U.S. president Dwight D. Eisenhower and resign in disgrace. Ikeda also inherited from Kishi a violent dispute at the Miike Coal Mine in Kyushu, where striking coal miners repeatedly clashed with right-wing thugs sent by their corporate overlords to break the strike. Ikeda had been a compromise candidate to succeed Kishi, and had only secured the premiership by promising to call an immediate election, just a few months later in the fall of 1960. Given Ikeda's image as an unpopular politician out of touch with the common people and prone to verbal gaffes, few expected Ikeda to be anything more than a temporary placeholder prime minister.

However, Ikeda surprised observers by undertaking a dramatic personal makeover. He drew a sharp contrast to Kishi's "high posture" (高姿勢, kō shisei) and ruthless, take-no-prisoners approach by taking a "low posture" (低姿勢, tei shisei) and by adopting an accommodating stance toward the political opposition and making "Tolerance and Patience" (i.e. toward the political opposition) his slogan for the fall election campaign. Ikeda also underwent a deliberate physical makeover, switching out the dark, double-breasted suits and severe, wire-rimmed glasses he had worn prior to becoming prime minister for more approachable light, single-breasted suits and thick, plastic-rimmed glasses. Most dramatically of all, Ikeda announced his bold Income Doubling Plan, which promised to double the size of Japan's economy in just ten years' time, by 1970. Eschewing the usual 5-year economic plan, Ikeda set an extremely ambitious 10-year time frame, promising a package of targeted tax breaks, government investment, and an expanded social safety net to turbocharge economic growth. Ikeda's new image and Income Doubling Plan proved popular, and he won a resounding victory at the polls in the fall, leaving no chance that one of his factional rivals in the LDP could replace him.

Upon taking office, Ikeda acted quickly to defuse the bloody clash at the Miike mine. As his Labor Minister, he chose Hirohide Ishida, who was a member of a rival political faction but was seen as more trustworthy by labor unions. He immediately dispatched Ishida to negotiate a compromise between the miners and Mitsui corporation, which owned the mine, and Ishida succeeded in getting the two sides to agree to binding arbitration, finally bringing an end to the year-long Miike Struggle in December 1960.

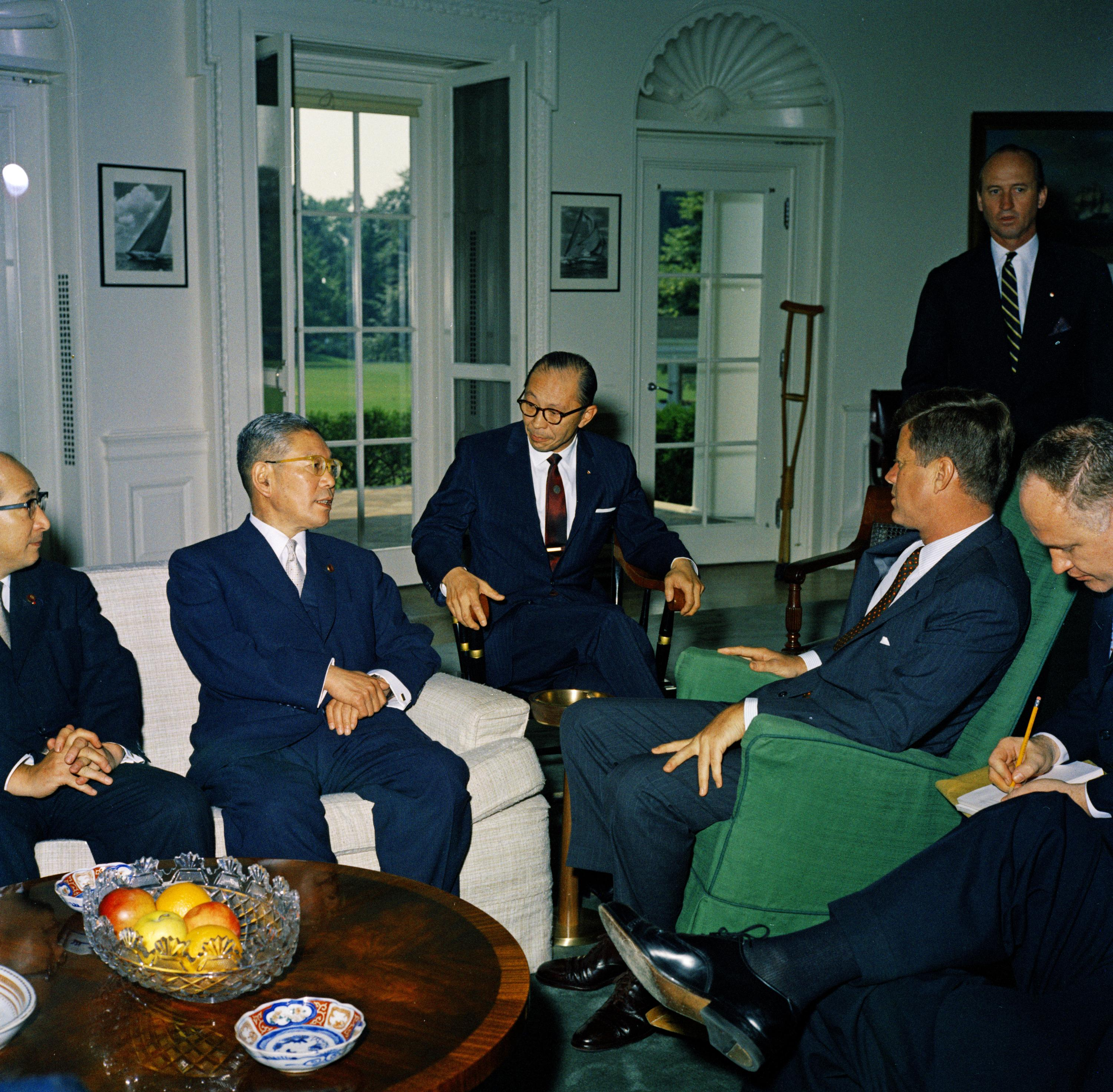
June 1961 summit meeting in Washington D.C. between Hayato Ikeda (second from left) and John F. Kennedy (fourth from left)

Ikeda also placed a high priority on repairing the U.S. Japan relationship, which had been damaged by the anti-American character of the anti-Treaty protests and the cancellation of Eisenhower's visit. He gave numerous reassurances to the U.S. government that he would staunchly support U.S. Cold War policies, including support for Taiwan and non-interaction with mainland China. He asked for, and was granted, a summit meeting with incoming U.S. president John F. Kennedy in Washington D.C. in the summer of 1961. At the summit, Ikeda reiterated his support for U.S. policy, and Kennedy promised to treat Japan more like a close ally such as Great Britain. Ikeda hoped to make up for Eisenhower's inability to visit Japan by hosting Kennedy in Tokyo, and Kennedy agreed. Plans were made for Kennedy to visit Japan in 1964, but he was assassinated before he could visit, and Secretary of State Dean Rusk went in his stead.

Ikeda also relentlessly pushed Japanese trade abroad, in support of his goal to expand export-led economic growth under the Income Doubling Plan. Targeted government investment in strategic manufacturing industries helped Japan move up the value chain and into high-tech and other higher-value-added goods. In 1962, French president Charles De Gaulle famously referred to Ikeda as "that transistor salesman," signalling that Japan was becoming more known for exporting electronics than for the cheap toys, bicycles, and textiles it had exported in the 1950s.

Domestically, Ikeda fulfilled his promise to expand the social safety net in support of the Income Doubling Plan. A universal national pension scheme was established in 1961, together with a system of universal health insurance. The Physically Disabled Persons Employment Promotion Law was passed in 1960 to promote the employment of people with physical disabilities through the creation of an employment quota system in Japan, an on-the-job adjustment scheme, and a financial assistance system in addition to offering vocational guidance and placement services through approximately 600 Public Employment Security Offices (PESO) and their branch offices. In addition, the 1963 Welfare Law for the Aged provided funding for respite care, home care, homes for the aged, and other services paid by taxes collected through local and central governments.

In 1963, Ikeda remained extremely popular and was able to win a second term as prime minister. Now he was powerful enough to take on the factional rivalries that had nearly torn the LDP apart during the Security Treaty Crisis. Ikeda took a number of steps to tame intra-party factional infighting, including appointing an "All-Faction Cabinet" with members from enemy factions, and bringing his bitter rival Ichirō Kōno into his government as Agriculture Minister, Construction Minister, and finally Minister in charge of planning the 1964 Tokyo Olympics, thus allowing Kōno to accrue much of the glory and credit for the successful Olympic Games, which were seen as Japan's "coming out party" after completing postwar reconstruction.

By 1963, Ikeda was also powerful enough to announce, over the objection of many conservatives in his own party, that the LDP would renounce any effort to revise Japan's postwar constitution and specifically Article 9, which forbade Japan from maintaining a military. He even made "no constitutional revision on our watch" one of the LDP's campaign slogans for the general election. This move outraged his predecessor Kishi, who had avidly pursued constitutional revision. However, it also severely damaged the electoral prospects of the opposition Japan Socialist Party going forward, as the JSP had previously been able to win votes by pointing out that they needed at least one-third of the seats in the Diet to block the LDP's attempts at revising the Constitution.

== Retirement and death ==
Ikeda contracted laryngeal cancer and was admitted to the National Cancer Center for treatment in September 1964, by which point the condition had progressed considerably. On 25 October, the day after the closing of the 1964 Summer Olympics in Tokyo, Ikeda announced his resignation. Hoping to avoid a vicious intra-party struggle to succeed him, Ikeda took the unusual step of personally designating Eisaku Satō as his successor. Ikeda's longstanding rival Ichirō Kōno respected his dying wish and declined to run for party president, clearing the way for Satō to succeed to the premiership.

Although Ikeda was released from the hospital in December 1964, he underwent another operation at the University of Tokyo Hospital in August 1965. He died of pneumonia on 13 August, several days after the operation, at the age of 65.

Ikeda's "Kōchikai" faction was one of the most powerful factions in the LDP, and occupied the left wing of the party. As faction leader, he was succeeded in turn by Shigesaburō Maeo, Masayoshi Ōhira, Zenkō Suzuki, Kiichi Miyazawa, Koichi Kato, Mitsuo Horiuchi, Makoto Koga, and Fumio Kishida. (Ōhira, Suzuki, Miyazawa, Kishida later became prime ministers)

== Legacy ==
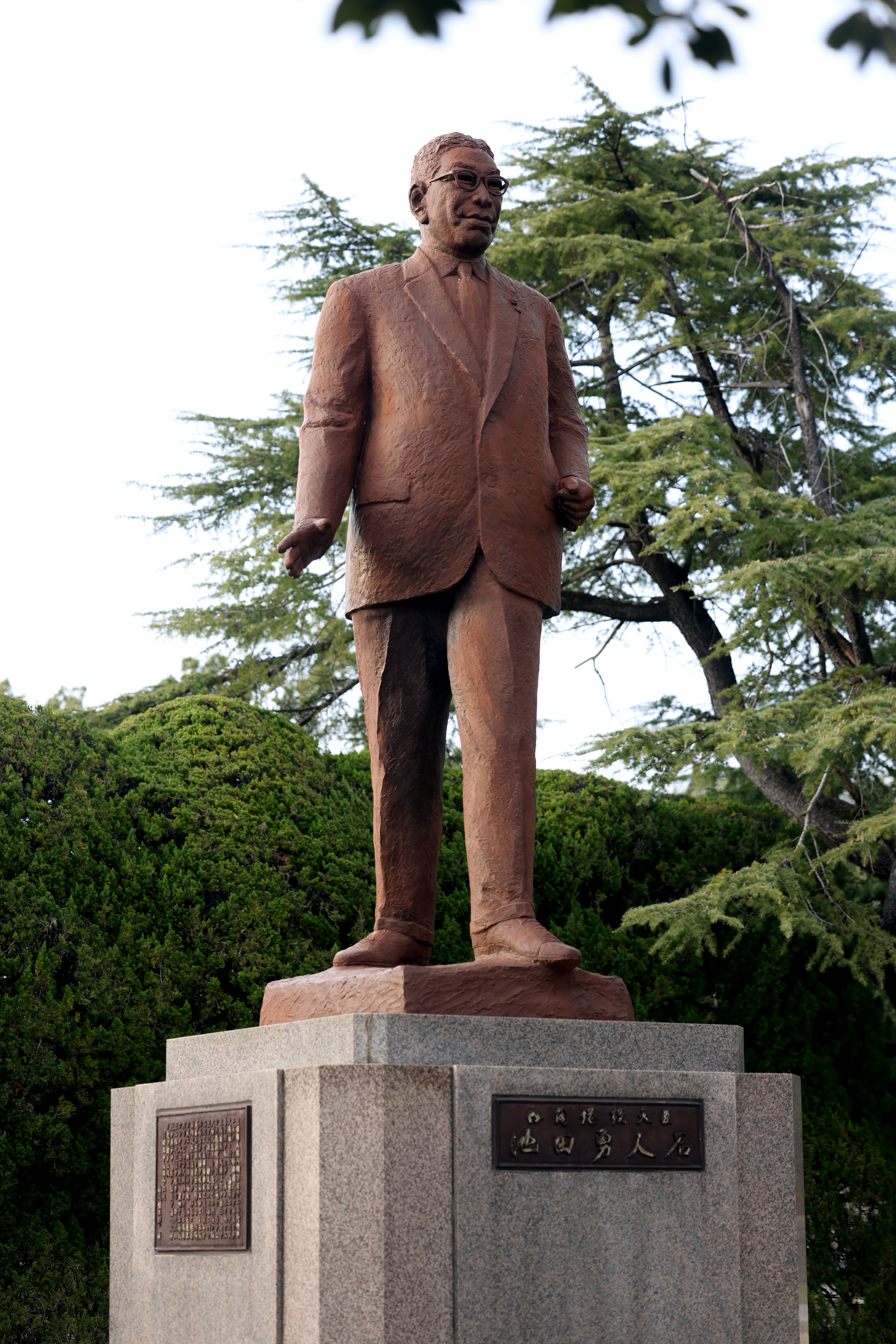
Statue of Ikeda in Hiroshima, Japan

Historian Nick Kapur credits Ikeda with stabilizing the "1955 System" in Japanese politics, after it nearly came apart amid vicious factional infighting within the LDP during the 1960 Security Treaty crisis. Ikeda's "low posture" and conciliatory politics helped tame factions within his own party and reduce inter-party conflict with the opposition parties in order to preclude future mass extra-parliamentary street protests. Ikeda helped turn the LDP into a stable, "big tent" party that could win thumping super-majorities at the polls by winning votes from a broad cross-section of interest groups, while also not abusing those super-majorities by ramming through unpopular policies. In particular, Ikeda's renunciation of constitutional revision, long seen as a holy grail by LDP conservatives, set the course for Japan's stable conservative rule under U.S. hegemony for the next several decades, and paved the way for the decline of the opposition Japan Socialist Party.

Ikeda's Income Doubling Plan also proved to be an astonishing success, helping greatly extend the lifespan of Japan's postwar "economic miracle." Although the initial target growth rate of the plan was 7.2% per year, by the mid 1960s Japan's GDP growth rate reached as high as 11.6%, and averaged greater than 10% over the entire decade, with the economy achieving the goal of doubling its size in less than seven years. Perhaps even more importantly, according to Kapur, Ikeda's Income Doubling Plan "enshrined 'economic growthism' as a sort of secular religion of both the Japanese people and their government, bringing about a circumstance in which both the effectiveness of the government and the worth of the populace came to be measured above all by the annual percentage change in GDP." Similarly, Japanese economist Takafusa Nakamura concluded that "Ikeda was the single most important figure in Japan's rapid [economic] growth. He will be remembered as the man who pulled together a national consensus for economic growth and who strove unceasingly for the realization of that goal."

== Honors ==
=== Domestic honors ===
- Grand Cordon of the Order of the Chrysanthemum (13 August 1965; posthumous)
- Senior Second Rank (13 August 1965; posthumous)

=== Foreign honor ===
- Peru : Grand Cross of the Order of the Sun of Peru (1961)
- Malaya: Honorary Grand Commander of the Order of the Defender of the Realm (S.M.N.) (1964)

== See also ==
- Kōchikai
- Income Doubling Plan
- Japanese post-war economic miracle
- Osamu Shimomura

Political offices
Preceded by Nobusuke Kishi	Prime Minister of Japan; 1960–1964	Succeeded by Eisaku Satō
Preceded by Tatsunosuke Takasaki	Minister of International Trade and Industry; 1959–1960	Succeeded by Mitsujiro Ishii
New office	Minister without portfolio 1958	Office abolished
Preceded by Hisato Ichimada	Minister of Finance; 1956–1957	Succeeded by Hisato Ichimada
Preceded by Ryutaro Takahashi	Minister of International Trade and Industry; 1952	Succeeded by Sankuro Ogasawara
Preceded by Takeshi Yamazaki	Ministry of State for Economic and Fiscal Policy; 1952	Succeeded by Sankuro Ogasawara
Preceded by Heitarō Inagaki	Minister of International Trade and Industry; 1950	Succeeded by Sotaro Takase
Preceded by Shinzō Ōya; Interim	Minister of Finance; 1949–1952	Succeeded by Tadaharu Mukai
Preceded by Yoshimi Yamada	Vice Minister of Finance; 1947–1948	Succeeded by Uichi Noda
Party political offices
Preceded by Nobusuke Kishi	President of the Liberal Democratic Party; 1960–1964	Succeeded by Eisaku Satō
New office	Head of Kōchikai; 1957–1965	Succeeded by Shigesaburō Maeo
Preceded by Eisaku Satō	Secretary General of the Liberal Party; 1954	Succeeded by Mitsujirō Ishii
Preceded by Fudayū Kogure	Chairman of the Policy Research Council, Liberal Party; 1953–1954	Succeeded by Mikio Mizuta
