= Third Yoshida cabinet =

Cabinet of Japan (1949–1952)

Third Yoshida Cabinet
- 49th Cabinet of Japan

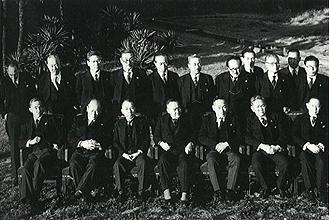
- Date formed: February 16, 1949
- Date dissolved: June 28, 1950

People and organisations
- Emperor: Shōwa
- Prime Minister: Shigeru Yoshida
- Deputy Prime Minister: Jōji Hayashi (until March 13, 1951)
- Member parties: (Allied occupation); Democratic Liberal Party (until March 1, 1950); Democratic Party (coalition faction) (until March 1, 1950); Liberal Party (since March 1, 1950); Ryokufūkai
- Status in legislature: House of Representatives: Majority; House of Councillors: Coalition majority
- Opposition parties: Democratic Party (opposition faction); Japan Socialist Party; National Cooperative Party; Labourers and Farmers Party

History
- Elections: 1949 general election; 1950 councillors election
- Legislature term: 5th-7th National Diet
- Predecessor: Second Yoshida Cabinet
- Successor: Third Yoshida Cabinet (First Reshuffle)

The Third Yoshida Cabinet was the 49th Cabinet of Japan. It was headed by Shigeru Yoshida from 16 February 1949 to 30 October 1952.

The Treaty of San Francisco came into force and the Allied occupation ended on 28 April 1952.

== Cabinet ==
=== Initial composition ===
Portfolio	Name	Political party	Term start	Term end
Prime Minister	Shigeru Yoshida	Democratic Liberal	February 16, 1949	October 30, 1952
Deputy Prime Minister	Jōji Hayashi	Democratic Liberal	February 16, 1949	March 13, 1951
Attorney General	Shunkichi Ueda	Independent	February 16, 1949	June 28, 1950
Minister for Foreign Affairs	Shigeru Yoshida	Democratic Liberal	February 16, 1949	April 1, 1952
Minister of Finance	Hayato Ikeda	Democratic Liberal	February 16, 1949	October 30, 1952
Minister of Education	Sōtarō Takase	Ryokufūkai	February 16, 1949	June 28, 1950
Minister of Health	Jōji Hayashi	Democratic Liberal	February 16, 1949	June 28, 1950
Minister of Agriculture, Forestry and Fisheries	Kōtarō Mori	Democratic Liberal	February 16, 1949	June 28, 1950
Minister of Commerce and Industry	Heitarō Inagaki	Democratic	February 16, 1949	May 25, 1949
Minister of International Trade and Industry	Heitarō Inagaki	Democratic	May 25, 1949	February 17, 1950
Minister of Transport	Shinzō Ōya	Democratic Liberal	February 16, 1949	June 28, 1950
Minister of Communications	Saeki Ozawa	Democratic Liberal	February 16, 1949	June 1, 1949
Minister of Labor	Masafumi Suzuki	Democratic Liberal	February 16, 1949	June 28, 1950
Minister of Construction	Shūji Masutani	Democratic Liberal	February 16, 1949	May 6, 1950
Minister of State Director-General of the Economic Stabilization Board Chair of the Price Board Director of the Central Economic Research Agency	Takayoshi Aoki	Democratic Liberal	February 16, 1949	June 28, 1950
Minister of State Director of the Administrative Management Agency	Ichirō Honda	Democratic Liberal	February 16, 1949	June 28, 1950
Minister of State Chairman of the Local Finance Committee	Kozaemon Kimura	Democratic Liberal	February 16, 1949	June 1, 1949
Minister of State Director-General of the Board of Reparations	Senzō Higai	Democratic Liberal	February 16, 1949	March 11, 1949
Minister of State Director-General of the Board of Reparations	Kikuichirō Yamaguchi	Democratic Liberal	March 11, 1949	June 28, 1950
Minister of State	Kikuichirō Yamaguchi	Democratic Liberal	February 16, 1949	March 11, 1949
Minister of State	Senzō Higai	Democratic Liberal	March 11, 1949	June 28, 1950
Chief Cabinet Secretary	Kaneshichi Masuda	Democratic Liberal	February 16, 1949	May 6, 1950
Deputy Chief Cabinet Secretary	Yūichi Kōri	Independent	February 16, 1949	June 1, 1949

=== Reorganized Cabinet ===
The Cabinet was reorganized on June 1, 1949.

Portfolio	Name	Political party	Term start	Term end
Prime Minister	Shigeru Yoshida	Liberal	February 16, 1949	October 30, 1952
Deputy Prime Minister	Jōji Hayashi	Liberal	February 16, 1949	March 13, 1951
Attorney General	Ueda Shunkichi	Independent	February 16, 1949	June 28, 1950
Minister for Foreign Affairs	Shigeru Yoshida	Liberal	February 16, 1949	April 1, 1952
Minister of Finance	Hayato Ikeda	Liberal	February 16, 1949	October 30, 1952
Minister of Education	Sōtarō Takase	Ryokufūkai	February 16, 1949	June 28, 1950
Minister of Health	Jōji Hayashi	Liberal	February 16, 1949	June 28, 1950
Minister of Agriculture, Forestry and Fisheries	Kōtarō Mori	Liberal	February 16, 1949	June 28, 1950
Minister of International Trade and Industry	Heitarō Inagaki	Democratic	May 25, 1949	February 17, 1950
Minister of International Trade and Industry	Hayato Ikeda	Liberal	February 17, 1950	April 11, 1950
Minister of International Trade and Industry	Sōtarō Takase	Ryokufūkai	April 11, 1950	June 28, 1950
Minister of Transport	Shinzō Ōya	Liberal	February 16, 1949	June 28, 1950
Minister of Posts Minister of Telecommunications	Saeki Ozawa	Liberal	June 1, 1949	June 28, 1950
Minister of Labor	Masafumi Suzuki	Liberal	February 16, 1949	June 28, 1950
Minister of Construction	Shūji Masutani	Liberal	February 16, 1949	May 6, 1950
Minister of Construction	Kaneshichi Masuda	Liberal	May 6, 1950	June 7, 1951
Minister of State Director-General of the Economic Stabilization Board Chair of the Price Board Director of the Central Economic Research Agency	Takayoshi Aoki	Liberal	February 16, 1949	June 28, 1950
Minister of State Director of the Administrative Management Agency	Ichirō Honda	Liberal	February 16, 1949	June 28, 1950
Minister of State Director of the Local Autonomy Agency	Kozaemon Kimura	Liberal	June 1, 1949	January 24, 1950
Minister of State Director of the Local Autonomy Agency	Ichirō Honda	Liberal	January 24, 1950	June 28, 1950
Minister of State Director-General of the Board of Reparations	Kikuichirō Yamaguchi	Liberal	March 11, 1949	June 28, 1950
Minister of State Director of the Hokkaido Regional Development Agency	Kaneshichi Masuda	Liberal	June 1, 1949	June 7, 1951
Minister of State	Senzō Higai	Liberal	March 11, 1949	June 28, 1950
Chief Cabinet Secretary	Kaneshichi Masuda	Liberal	February 16, 1949	May 6, 1950
Chief Cabinet Secretary	Katsuo Okazaki	Liberal	May 6, 1950	December 26, 1951
Cabinet Secretary	Yūichi Kōri	Independent	June 1, 1949	February 16, 1950
Cabinet Secretary	Yoshimaru Kanno	Independent	November 1, 1949	August 13, 1952
Cabinet Secretary	Seiichi Inōe	Independent	June 20, 1950	May 25, 1951

=== First Cabinet reshuffle ===
Third Yoshida Cabinet (First Reshuffle)
- 49th Cabinet of Japan

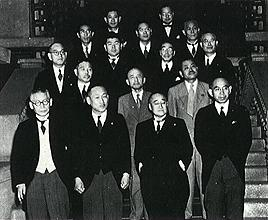
- Date formed: June 28, 1950
- Date dissolved: July 4, 1951

People and organisations
- Emperor: Shōwa
- Prime Minister: Shigeru Yoshida
- Deputy Prime Minister: Hayashi Jōji (until March 13, 1951)
- Member parties: (Allied occupation); Liberal Party; Ryokufūkai
- Status in legislature: House of Representatives: Majority; House of Councillors: Coalition majority
- Opposition parties: Democratic Party (opposition faction); Japan Socialist Party; National Cooperative Party; Labourers and Farmers Party

History
- Legislature term: 8th-10th National Diet
- Predecessor: Third Yoshida Cabinet
- Successor: Third Yoshida Cabinet (Second Reshuffle)

The first Cabinet reshuffle took place on June 28, 1950.

Portfolio	Name	Political party	Term start	Term end
Prime Minister	Shigeru Yoshida	Liberal	February 16, 1949	October 30, 1952
Deputy Prime Minister Minister of State (since June 28, 1950)	Jōji Hayashi	Liberal	February 16, 1949	March 13, 1951
Attorney General	Takeo Ōhashi	Liberal	June 28, 1950	December 26, 1951
Minister for Foreign Affairs	Shigeru Yoshida	Liberal	February 16, 1949	April 1, 1952
Minister of Finance	Hayato Ikeda	Liberal	February 16, 1949	October 30, 1952
Minister of Education	Teiyū Amano	Independent	June 28, 1950	August 12, 1952
Minister of Health	Takeo Kurokawa	Liberal	June 28, 1950	July 4, 1951
Minister of Agriculture, Forestry and Fisheries	Kōzen Hirokawa	Liberal	June 28, 1950	July 4, 1951
Minister of International Trade and Industry	Shigemi Yokoo	Liberal	June 28, 1950	July 4, 1951
Minister of Transport	Takeshi Yamazaki	Liberal	June 28, 1950	December 26, 1951
Minister of Posts Minister of Telecommunications	Bunkichi Tamura	Liberal	June 28, 1950	July 4, 1951
Minister of Labor	Shigeru Hori	Liberal	June 28, 1950	December 26, 1951
Minister of Construction	Kaneshichi Masuda	Liberal	May 6, 1950	June 7, 1951
Minister of Construction	Hideo Sutō	Liberal	June 7, 1951	July 4, 1951
Minister of State Director-General of the Economic Stabilization Board Chair of the Price Board Director of the Central Economic Research Agency	Hideo Sutō	Liberal	June 28, 1950	August 1, 1952
Minister of State Director of the Administrative Management Agency	Kiyohide Okano	Liberal	June 28, 1950	July 12, 1950
Minister of State Director of the Administrative Management Agency	Kōzen Hirokawa	Liberal	July 12, 1950	July 4, 1951
Minister of State Director of the Local Autonomy Agency	Kiyohide Okano	Liberal	June 28, 1950	August 1, 1952
Minister of State Director-General of the Board of Reparations	Kaneshichi Masuda	Liberal	June 28, 1950	June 7, 1951
Minister of State Director-General of the Board of Reparations	Hideo Sutō	Liberal	June 7, 1951	December 26, 1951
Minister of State Director of the Hokkaido Regional Development Agency	Kaneshichi Masuda	Liberal	June 1, 1949	June 7, 1951
Minister of State Director of the Hokkaido Regional Development Agency	Hideo Sutō	Liberal	June 7, 1951	July 4, 1951
Chief Cabinet Secretary	Katsuo Okazaki	Liberal	May 6, 1950	December 26, 1951
Cabinet Secretary	Yoshimaru Kanno	Independent	November 1, 1949	August 13, 1952
Cabinet Secretary	Seiichi Inōe	Independent	June 20, 1950	May 25, 1951
Cabinet Secretary	Toshihiro Kennoki	Independent	May 25, 1951	October 30, 1952

=== Second Cabinet reshuffle ===
Third Yoshida Cabinet (Second Reshuffle)
- 49th Cabinet of Japan

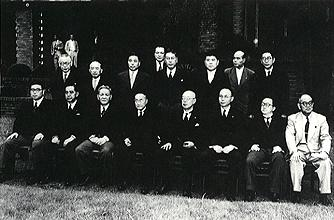
- Date formed: July 4, 1951
- Date dissolved: December 26, 1951

People and organisations
- Emperor: Shōwa
- Prime Minister: Shigeru Yoshida
- Member parties: (Allied occupation); Liberal Party; Ryokufūkai
- Status in legislature: House of Representatives: Majority; House of Councillors: Coalition majority
- Opposition parties: Democratic Party (opposition faction); Japan Socialist Party; National Cooperative Party; Labourers and Farmers Party

History
- Legislature term: 11th-13th National Diet
- Predecessor: Third Yoshida Cabinet (First Reshuffle)
- Successor: Third Yoshida Cabinet (Third Reshuffle)

The second Cabinet reshuffle took place on July 4, 1951.

Portfolio	Name	Political party	Term start	Term end
Prime Minister	Shigeru Yoshida	Liberal	February 16, 1949	October 30, 1952
Attorney General	Takeo Ōhashi	Liberal	June 28, 1950	December 26, 1951
Minister for Foreign Affairs	Shigeru Yoshida	Liberal	February 16, 1949	April 1, 1952
Minister of Finance	Hayato Ikeda	Liberal	February 16, 1949	October 30, 1952
Minister of Education	Teiyū Amano	Independent	June 28, 1950	August 12, 1952
Minister of Health	Ryōgo Hashimoto	Liberal	July 4, 1951	January 18, 1952
Minister of Agriculture, Forestry and Fisheries	Ryūtarō Nemoto	Independent	July 4, 1951	December 26, 1951
Minister of International Trade and Industry	Ryūtarō Takahashi	Independent	July 4, 1951	October 30, 1952
Minister of Transport	Takeshi Yamazaki	Liberal	June 28, 1950	December 26, 1951
Minister of Posts	Eisaku Satō	Liberal	July 4, 1951	October 30, 1952
Minister of Telecommunications	Eisaku Satō	Liberal	July 4, 1951	August 1, 1952
Minister of Labor	Shigeru Hori	Liberal	June 28, 1950	December 26, 1951
Minister of Construction	Uichi Noda	Liberal	July 4, 1951	October 30, 1952
Minister of State Director-General of the Economic Stabilization Board Chair of the Price Board Director of the Central Economic Research Agency	Hideo Sutō	Liberal	June 28, 1950	August 1, 1952
Minister of State Director of the Administrative Management Agency	Ryōgo Hashimoto	Liberal	July 4, 1951	January 18, 1952
Minister of State Director of the Local Autonomy Agency	Kiyohide Okano	Liberal	June 28, 1950	August 1, 1952
Minister of State Director-General of the Board of Reparations	Hideo Sutō	Liberal	June 7, 1951	December 26, 1951
Minister of State Director of the Hokkaido Regional Development Agency	Uichi Noda	Liberal	July 4, 1951	October 30, 1952
Minister of State	Shūji Masutani	Liberal	July 4, 1951	December 26, 1951
Chief Cabinet Secretary	Katsuo Okazaki	Liberal	May 6, 1950	December 26, 1951
Cabinet Secretary	Yoshimaru Kanno	Independent	November 1, 1949	August 13, 1952
Cabinet Secretary	Toshihiro Kennoki	Independent	May 25, 1951	October 30, 1952

=== Third Cabinet reshuffle ===
Third Yoshida Cabinet (Third Reshuffle)
- 49th Cabinet of Japan

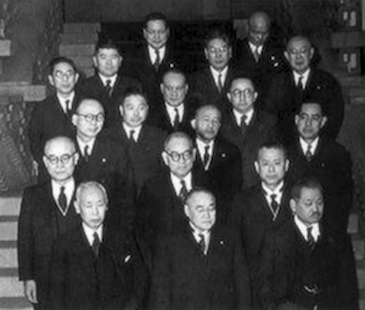
- Date formed: December 26, 1951
- Date dissolved: October 30, 1952

People and organisations
- Emperor: Shōwa
- Prime Minister: Shigeru Yoshida
- Member parties: (Allied occupation: until April 28, 1952); Liberal Party; Ryokufūkai
- Status in legislature: House of Representatives: Majority; House of Councillors: Coalition majority
- Opposition parties: Democratic Party (opposition faction); Japan Socialist Party; National Cooperative Party; Labourers and Farmers Party

History
- Legislature term: 13th-15th National Diet
- Predecessor: Third Yoshida Cabinet (Second Reshuffle)
- Successor: Fourth Yoshida Cabinet

The third Cabinet reshuffle took place on December 26, 1951.

Portfolio	Name	Political party	Term start	Term end
Prime Minister	Shigeru Yoshida	Liberal	February 16, 1949	October 30, 1952
Attorney General	Tōkutarō Kimura	Liberal	December 26, 1951	August 1, 1952
Minister of Justice	Kimura	Liberal	August 1, 1952	October 30, 1952
Minister for Foreign Affairs	Shigeru Yoshida	Liberal	February 16, 1949	April 1, 1952
Minister for Foreign Affairs	Katsuo Okazaki	Liberal	April 1, 1952	October 30, 1952
Minister of Finance	Hayato Ikeda	Liberal	February 16, 1949	October 30, 1952
Minister of Education	Teiyū Amano	Independent	June 28, 1950	August 12, 1952
Minister of Education	Kiyohide Okano	Liberal	August 12, 1952	October 30, 1952
Minister of Health	Ryōgo Hashimoto	Liberal	July 4, 1951	January 18, 1952
Minister of Health	Eichi Yoshitake	Liberal	January 18, 1952	October 30, 1952
Minister of Agriculture, Forestry and Fisheries	Kōzen Hirokawa	Liberal	December 26, 1951	October 30, 1952
Minister of International Trade and Industry	Ryūtarō Takahashi	Independent	July 4, 1951	October 30, 1952
Minister of Transport	Giichi Murakami	Independent	December 26, 1951	October 30, 1952
Minister of Posts	Eisaku Satō	Liberal	July 4, 1951	October 30, 1952
Minister of Telecommunications	Eisaku Satō	Liberal	July 4, 1951	August 1, 1952
Minister of Labor	Eichi Yoshitake	Liberal	December 26, 1951	October 30, 1952
Minister of Construction	Uichi Noda	Liberal	July 4, 1951	October 30, 1952
Minister of State Director-General of the Economic Stabilization Board Chair of the Price Board Director of the Central Economic Research Agency	Hideo Sutō	Liberal	June 28, 1950	August 1, 1952
Minister of State Director of the Economic Deliberation Agency	Hideo Sutō	Liberal	August 1, 1952	September 2, 1952
Minister of State Director of the Economic Deliberation Agency	Takeshi Yamazaki	Liberal	September 2, 1952	October 30, 1952
Minister of State Director of the Administrative Management Agency	Ryōgo Hashimoto	Liberal	July 4, 1951	January 18, 1952
Minister of State Director of the Administrative Management Agency	Tōkutarō Kimura	Liberal	January 18, 1952	April 5, 1952
Minister of State Director of the Administrative Management Agency	Uichi Noda	Liberal	April 5, 1952	October 30, 1952
Minister of State Director of the Local Autonomy Agency	Kiyohide Okano	Liberal	June 28, 1950	August 1, 1952
Minister of State Director of the Autonomy Agency	Kiyohide Okano	Liberal	August 1, 1952	October 30, 1952
Minister of State (until December 27, 1951) Director-General of the Board of Reparations	Katsuo Okazaki	Liberal	December 26, 1951	April 28, 1952
Minister of State Director of the Hokkaido Regional Development Agency	Uichi Noda	Liberal	July 4, 1951	October 30, 1952
Minister of State Commissioner of the National Safety Agency	Shigeru Yoshida (acting)	Liberal	August 1, 1952	October 30, 1952
Minister of State	Takeo Ōhashi	Liberal	December 26, 1951	August 1, 1952
Minister of State	Takeshi Yamazaki	Liberal	December 26, 1951	September 2, 1952
Minister of State	Katsuo Okazaki	Liberal	April 29, 1952	April 30, 1952
Minister of State	Katsumi Yamagata	Liberal	September 2, 1952	October 30, 1952
Minister of State	Hidejirō Ōnogi	Liberal	September 2, 1952	October 30, 1952
Minister of State	Toshihiko Nakayama	Liberal	September 2, 1952	October 30, 1952
Chief Cabinet Secretary	Shigeru Hori	Liberal	December 26, 1951	October 30, 1952
Cabinet Secretary	Yoshimaru Kanno	Independent	November 1, 1949	August 13, 1952
Cabinet Secretary	Toshihiro Kennoki	Independent	May 25, 1951	October 30, 1952
Cabinet Secretary	Mitoru Eguchi	Independent	December 26, 1951	August 13, 1952
