= Second Yoshida cabinet =

Cabinet of Japan (1948–1949)

Second Yoshida Cabinet
- 48th Cabinet of Japan

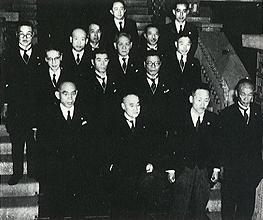
- Date formed: October 15, 1948
- Date dissolved: February 16, 1949

People and organisations
- Emperor: Hirohito
- Prime Minister: Shigeru Yoshida
- Deputy Prime Minister: Jōji Hayashi
- Member parties: (Allied occupation); Democratic Liberal Party; Ryokufūkai
- Status in legislature: Minority
- Opposition parties: Japan Socialist Party; Democratic Party; National Cooperative Party

History
- Legislature term: 3rd-5th National Diet
- Predecessor: Ashida Cabinet
- Successor: Third Yoshida Cabinet

The Second Yoshida Cabinet is the 48th Cabinet of Japan. It was headed by Shigeru Yoshida from 15 October 1948 to 16 February 1949, during the Allied occupation.

== Cabinet ==
| Portfolio | Name | Political party | Term start | Term end |
|---|---|---|---|---|
| Prime Minister | Shigeru Yoshida | Democratic Liberal | October 15, 1948 | February 16, 1949 |
| Deputy Prime Minister | Jōji Hayashi | Democratic Liberal | October 19, 1948 | February 16, 1949 |
| Attorney General | Shigeru Yoshida (acting) | Democratic Liberal | October 15, 1948 | November 7, 1948 |
| Attorney General | Shunkichi Ueda | Independent | November 7, 1948 | February 16, 1949 |
| Minister for Foreign Affairs | Shigeru Yoshida | Democratic Liberal | October 15, 1948 | February 16, 1949 |
| Minister of Finance | Shigeru Yoshida (acting) | Democratic Liberal | October 15, 1948 | October 19, 1948 |
| Minister of Finance | Sanroku Izumiyama | Democratic Liberal | October 19, 1948 | December 14, 1948 |
| Minister of Finance | Shinzō Ōya | Democratic Liberal | December 14, 1948 | February 16, 1949 |
| Minister of Education | Shigeru Yoshida (acting) | Democratic Liberal | October 15, 1948 | October 19, 1948 |
| Minister of Education | Yasumaro Shimojo | Ryokufūkai | October 19, 1948 | February 16, 1949 |
| Minister of Health | Shigeru Yoshida (acting) | Democratic Liberal | October 15, 1948 | October 19, 1948 |
| Minister of Health | Jōji Hayashi | Democratic Liberal | October 19, 1948 | February 16, 1949 |
| Minister of Agriculture, Forestry and Fisheries | Shigeru Yoshida (acting) | Democratic Liberal | October 15, 1948 | October 19, 1948 |
| Minister of Agriculture, Forestry and Fisheries | Hideo Sutō | Democratic Liberal | October 19, 1948 | February 16, 1949 |
| Minister of Commerce and Industry | Shigeru Yoshida (acting) | Democratic Liberal | October 15, 1948 | October 19, 1948 |
| Minister of Commerce and Industry | Shinzō Ōya | Democratic Liberal | October 19, 1948 | February 16, 1949 |
| Minister of Transport | Shigeru Yoshida (acting) | Democratic Liberal | October 15, 1948 | October 19, 1948 |
| Minister of Transport | Saeki Ozawa | Democratic Liberal | October 19, 1948 | February 16, 1949 |
| Minister of Communications | Shigeru Yoshida (acting) | Democratic Liberal | October 15, 1948 | October 19, 1948 |
| Minister of Communications | Tokuya Furuhata | Democratic Liberal | October 19, 1948 | February 16, 1949 |
| Minister of Labor | Shigeru Yoshida (acting) | Democratic Liberal | October 15, 1948 | October 19, 1948 |
| Minister of Labor | Kaneshichi Masuda | Democratic Liberal | October 19, 1948 | February 16, 1949 |
| Minister of Construction | Shigeru Yoshida (acting) | Democratic Liberal | October 15, 1948 | October 19, 1948 |
| Minister of Construction | Shūji Masutani | Democratic Liberal | October 19, 1948 | February 16, 1949 |
| Minister of State; Director-General of the Economic Stabilization Board; Chairman of the Price Board; Director of the Central Economic Research Agency | Shigeru Yoshida (acting) | Democratic Liberal | October 15, 1948 | October 2, 1948 |
| Minister of State; Director-General of the Economic Stabilization Board; Chairman of the Price Board; Director of the Central Economic Research Agency | Sanroku Izumiyama | Democratic Liberal | October 19, 1948 | December 14, 1948 |
| Minister of State; Director-General of the Economic Stabilization Board; Chairman of the Price Board; Director of the Central Economic Research Agency | Hideo Sutō (acting) | Democratic Liberal | December 14, 1948 | February 16, 1949 |
| Minister of State; Director of the Administrative Management Agency | Shigeru Yoshida (acting) | Democratic Liberal | October 15, 1948 | October 19, 1948 |
| Minister of State; Director of the Administrative Management Agency | Shunkichi Ueda | Independent | October 19, 1948 | November 10, 1948 |
| Minister of State; Director of the Administrative Management Agency | Tetsuo Kudō | Democratic Liberal | November 10, 1948 | February 16, 1949 |
| Minister of State; Director-General of the Board of Reparations | Shigeru Yoshida (acting) | Democratic Liberal | October 15, 1948 | October 19, 1948 |
| Minister of State; Director-General of the Board of Reparations | Tomoharu Inoue | Democratic Liberal | October 19, 1948 | February 16, 1949 |
| Minister of State; Chairman of the Local Finance Committee | Vacant | | October 15, 1948 | October 19, 1948 |
| Minister of State; Chairman of the Local Finance Committee | Nobuyuki Iwamoto | Democratic Liberal | October 19, 1948 | February 10, 1949 |
| Minister of State; Chairman of the Local Finance Committee | Vacant | | February 10, 1949 | February 16, 1949 |
| Minister of State | Kōtarō Mori | Democratic Liberal | October 19, 1948 | February 16, 1949 |
| Chief Cabinet Secretary | Eisaku Satō | Democratic Liberal | October 17, 1948 | February 16, 1949 |
| Deputy Chief Cabinet Secretary | Ryōgo Hashimoto | Independent | October 17, 1948 | December 26, 1948 |
| Deputy Chief Cabinet Secretary | Yūichi Kōri | Independent | October 17, 1948 | December 26, 1948 |
