= Kaneshichi Masuda =

Japanese politician

- 増田 甲子七
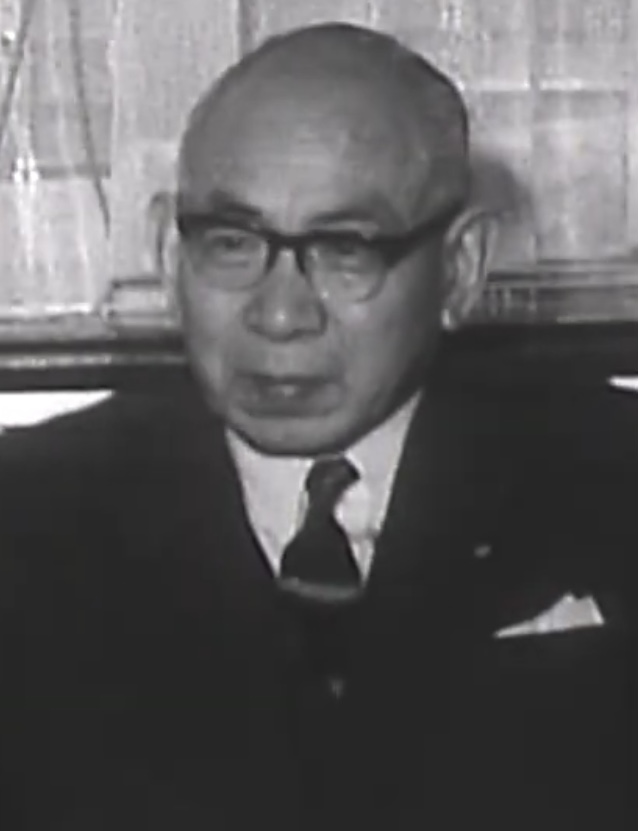
- Masuda in 1948

Director-General of the Defense Agency
- In office 3 December 1966 – 30 November 1968
- Prime Minister: Eisaku Satō
- Preceded by: Eikichi Kanbayashiyama
- Succeeded by: Kiichi Arita
Ministerial offices
Director-General of the Reparations Agency
In office 28 June 1950 – 7 June 1951
Prime Minister	Shigeru Yoshida
Preceded by	Kikuichirō Yamaguchi
Succeeded by	Hideo Sutō
Director-General of the Hokkaido Development Agency
In office 1 June 1950 – 7 June 1951
Prime Minister	Shigeru Yoshida
Preceded by	Office established
Succeeded by	Hideo Sutō
Minister of Construction
In office 6 May 1950 – 7 June 1951
Prime Minister	Shigeru Yoshida
Preceded by	Shūji Masutani
Succeeded by	Hideo Sutō
Chief Cabinet Secretary
In office 16 February 1949 – 6 May 1950
Prime Minister	Shigeru Yoshida
Preceded by	Eisaku Satō
Succeeded by	Katsuo Okazaki
Minister of Labour
In office 15 October 1948 – 16 February 1949
Prime Minister	Shigeru Yoshida
Preceded by	Kanjū Katō; Shigeru Yoshida (acting)
Succeeded by	Masafumi Suzuki
Minister of Transport
In office 31 January 1947 – 24 May 1947
Prime Minister	Shigeru Yoshida
Preceded by	Hiratsuka Tsunejirō
Succeeded by	Tetsu Katayama (acting); Gizō Tomabechi

Member of the House of Representatives
- In office 5 December 1976 – 7 September 1979
- Preceded by: Sadataka Ozawa
- Succeeded by: Sadataka Ozawa
- Constituency: Nagano 4th
- In office 22 May 1958 – 13 November 1972
- Preceded by: Etsujirō Uehara
- Succeeded by: Sadataka Ozawa
- Constituency: Nagano 4th
- In office 25 April 1947 – 24 January 1955
- Preceded by: Constituency established
- Succeeded by: Etsujirō Uehara
- Constituency: Nagano 4th
Gubernatorial offices
Director-General of the Hokkaidō Agency
In office 25 April 1946 – 31 January 1947
Monarch	Hirohito
Preceded by	Yukio Tomeoka
Succeeded by	Kaneyoshi Okada
Governor of Fukushima Prefecture
In office 27 October 1945 – 25 April 1946
Monarch	Hirohito
Preceded by	Ishii Masakazu
Succeeded by	Kan'ichirō Ishihara

Personal details
- Born: 4 October 1898 Sakakita, Nagano, Japan
- Died: 21 December 1985 (aged 87)
- Resting place: Tama Cemetery
- Party: Liberal Democratic
- Other political affiliations: JLP (1947–1948); DLP (1948–1950); LP (1950–1955)
- Education: Kyoto Imperial University

Kaneshichi Masuda (増田 甲子七, Masuda Kaneshichi; 4 October 1898 – 21 December 1985) was a Japanese bureaucrat, cabinet minister, and politician. A career official of the Home Ministry, he served as Governor of Fukushima Prefecture and as Director-General of the Hokkaidō Agency before entering national politics. Under Shigeru Yoshida he held cabinet office as Chief Cabinet Secretary, Minister of Labour, Minister of Transport, Minister of Construction, and the inaugural Director-General of the Hokkaido Development Agency. He later returned to cabinet as Director-General of the Defense Agency under Eisaku Satō.

== Early life and education ==
Masuda was born on 4 October 1898 in what is now Chikuhoku, Nagano Prefecture. He studied at Matsumoto Middle School and the Eighth Higher School, later passed the higher-school graduation examination, and graduated from the law faculty of Kyoto Imperial University in 1922. He entered the Home Ministry in April 1922.

== Bureaucratic career ==
After entering the Home Ministry, Masuda served in police and local-administration posts, including service as an Osaka prefectural police inspector and as social affairs chief in Hyōgo Prefecture. By the end of the Pacific War he had risen to the governorship of Fukushima Prefecture, taking office on 27 October 1945.

On 25 April 1946 he became the 30th Director-General of the Hokkaidō Agency. His tenure lasted until 31 January 1947.

== Political career ==
Masuda entered the First Yoshida Cabinet as Minister of Transport on 31 January 1947. In the Second Yoshida Cabinet he served as Minister of Labour from 15 October 1948 until 16 February 1949. On 16 February 1949, with the formation of the Third Yoshida Cabinet, he became Chief Cabinet Secretary.

In the 1949 Japanese general election, Masuda was elected to the House of Representatives from Nagano 4th district as a Democratic Liberal Party candidate. He was re-elected in 1952 as a Liberal Party candidate, but lost his seat until returning to the House at the 1958 Japanese general election as a Liberal Democratic Party candidate. He later won a further term in the 1967 Japanese general election.

Masuda remained one of Yoshida's close associates. On 6 May 1950 he became Minister of Construction, and when the Hokkaido Development Agency was established on 1 June 1950 he became its first Director-General, holding both posts until 7 June 1951. He also served as secretary-general of the Liberal Party.

Under Satō, Masuda returned to cabinet as Director-General of the Defense Agency. He held that office in the Second Satō Cabinet from 17 February 1967 and continued through the first remodelling of 25 November 1967, remaining in post until the second remodelling on 30 November 1968.

== Later life ==
He retired from politics in 1979 and thereafter worked as a lawyer while also serving as chairman of the Liberal Democratic Party's national Diet members' association. He died on 21 December 1985, aged 87.
