= Yoshida Cabinet =

Yoshida Cabinet may refer to:

- First Yoshida Cabinet, the Japanese government led by Shigeru Yoshida from 1946 to 1947
- Second Yoshida Cabinet, the Japanese government led by Shigeru Yoshida from 1948 to 1949
- Third Yoshida Cabinet, the Japanese government led by Shigeru Yoshida from 1949 to 1952
- Fourth Yoshida Cabinet, the Japanese government led by Shigeru Yoshida from 1952 to 1953
- Fifth Yoshida Cabinet, the Japanese government led by Shigeru Yoshida from 1953 to 1954
