= Heitarō Inagaki =

Japanese politician

- 稲垣 平太郎
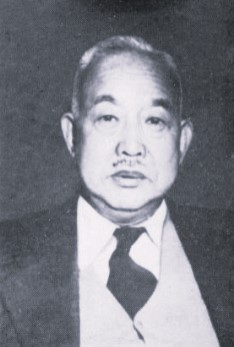

Minister of International Trade and Industry
- In office 25 May 1949 – 17 February 1950
- Prime Minister: Shigeru Yoshida
- Preceded by: Himself (as Minister of Commerce and Industry)
- Succeeded by: Hayato Ikeda

Minister of Commerce and Industry
- In office 16 February 1949 – 25 May 1949
- Prime Minister: Shigeru Yoshida
- Preceded by: Shinzō Ōya
- Succeeded by: Himself (as Minister of International Trade and Industry)

Member of the House of Councillors
- In office 3 May 1947 – 2 May 1953
- Preceded by: Constituency established
- Succeeded by: Multi-member district
- Constituency: National district

Personal details
- Born: 4 July 1888 Okayama City, Okayama, Japan
- Died: 23 April 1976 (aged 87)
- Resting place: Aoyama Cemetery
- Party: Independent
- Other political affiliations: DP (1947–1948); DLP (1948–1950); LDP (1962)
- Education: Keio University

Heitarō Inagaki (稲垣 平太郎, Inagaki Heitarō; 4 July 1888 – 23 April 1976) was an entrepreneur and politician, who served as the final Minister of Commerce and Industry and first Minister of Economy, Trade and Industry in post-war Japan.

== Early life ==
Inagaki was born in the city of Okayama. He graduated from the Economics Department of Keio University in 1913. Although he received a job offer from Mitsui Bussan, he was recruited personally by Furukawa Toranosuke, the president of the Fukukawa zaibatsu and went to work for Furukawa instead. During World War I, he was sent to Germany, where he negotiated a joint-venture, which Fuji Electric in 1923. Afterwards, he became a director of the Jiji Shimpo newspaper (1932), director of Yokohama Rubber Company (1942), president of Yokohama Rubber (1945) and chairman of Yokohama Rubber (1947).

== Political career ==
In 1947, Inagaki was elected to a seat in the Diet of Japan in 1947 Upper House election under the Minshutō banner. He supported efforts to join with the Democratic Liberal Party (LDP) in a coalition government in 1949, and became the final Minister of Commerce and Industry and first Minister of Economy, Trade and Industry under the Third Yoshida Cabinet. In this post, he advised the American occupation authorities that he foresaw a time when China would become Japan’s most important trading partner.

Inagaki joined with Kamejiro Hayashida in 1950 to form the Minshu Kurabu (Democratic Club), which later merged with the Liberal Party. However, in the 1953 Upper House election, he chose to run as an independent, but was not elected.

Afterwards, Inagaski served as chairman of the Japan Foreign Trade Council (JFTC), chairman of Nippon Broadcasting System, chairman of Nippon Zeon Corporation, and as a director of the Institute of National Policy Research. He attempted a return to politics in the 1962 Japanese House of Councillors election under the LDP banner, but failed to secure a seat. He was awarded the Order of the Sacred Treasure, 1st class in 1971.

Political offices
Preceded by Shinzō Ōya	Minister of Commerce and Industry; Feb 1949 – May 1949	Succeeded by -abolished-
Preceded by -none-	Minister of International Trade and Industry; Feb 1949 – Jun 1950	Succeeded by Hayato Ikeda
