= Eisaku Satō =

Prime Minister of Japan from 1964 to 1972

- 佐藤 栄作
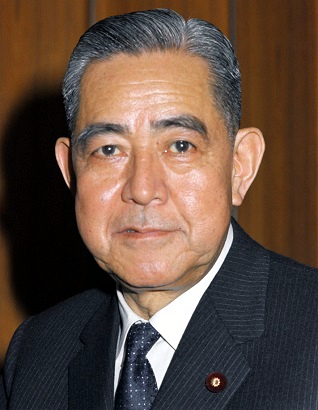
- Official portrait, 1964

Prime Minister of Japan
- In office 9 November 1964 – 7 July 1972
- Monarch: Hirohito
- Preceded by: Hayato Ikeda
- Succeeded by: Kakuei Tanaka

President of the Liberal Democratic Party
- In office 1 December 1964 – 5 July 1972
- Vice President: Shojiro Kawashima (1964–1966; 1967–1970)
- Secretary-General: Takeo Miki; Kakuei Tanaka; Takeo Fukuda; Kakuei Tanaka; Shigeru Hori
- Preceded by: Hayato Ikeda
- Succeeded by: Kakuei Tanaka
Ministerial offices
Minister for Foreign Affairs
In office 29 October 1968 – 30 November 1968
Prime Minister	Himself
Preceded by	Takeo Miki
Succeeded by	Kiichi Aichi
Director-General of the Science and Technology Agency
In office 18 July 1963 – 29 June 1964
Prime Minister	Hayato Ikeda
Preceded by	Tsuruyo Kondo
Succeeded by	Hayato Ikeda (acting); Kiichi Aichi
Director-General of the Hokkaido Development Agency
In office 18 July 1963 – 29 June 1964
Prime Minister	Hayato Ikeda
Preceded by	Kawashima Shojiro
Succeeded by	Hayato Ikeda (acting); Keikichi Masuhara
In office 30 October 1952 – 10 February 1953
Prime Minister	Shigeru Yoshida
Preceded by	Uichi Noda
Succeeded by	Kuichirō Totsuka
Minister of International Trade and Industry
In office 18 July 1961 – 18 July 1962
Prime Minister	Hayato Ikeda
Preceded by	Etsusaburo Shiina
Succeeded by	Hajime Fukuda
Minister of Finance
In office 12 June 1958 – 19 July 1960
Prime Minister	Nobusuke Kishi
Preceded by	Hisato Ichimada
Succeeded by	Mikio Mizuta
Minister of Construction
In office 30 October 1952 – 10 February 1953
Prime Minister	Shigeru Yoshida
Preceded by	Uichi Noda
Succeeded by	Kuichirō Totsuka
Minister of Posts and Telecommunications
In office 4 July 1951 – 30 October 1952
Prime Minister	Shigeru Yoshida
Preceded by	Bunkichi Tamura
Succeeded by	Sōtarō Takase
Minister of Telecommunications
In office 4 July 1951 – 1 August 1952
Prime Minister	Shigeru Yoshida
Preceded by	Bunkichi Tamura
Succeeded by	Office abolished
Chief Cabinet Secretary
In office 17 October 1948 – 16 February 1949
Prime Minister	Shigeru Yoshida
Preceded by	Gizō Tomabechi
Succeeded by	Kaneshichi Masuda

Member of the House of Representatives
- In office 23 January 1949 – 3 June 1975
- Preceded by: Taku Shigetomi
- Succeeded by: Sakahiko Kōmura
- Constituency: Yamaguchi 2nd

Personal details
- Born: 27 March 1901 Kumage, Yamaguchi, Japan
- Died: 3 June 1975 (aged 74) Minato, Tokyo, Japan
- Party: LDP (1955–1975)
- Other political affiliations: DLP (1948–1950); JLP (1950–1955)
- Spouse: Hiroko Satō (m. 1926)
- Children: 2, including Shinji
- Relatives: Satō–Kishi–Abe family
- Education: Tokyo Imperial University
- Awards: Nobel Peace Prize (1974)

Japanese name
- Shinjitai: 佐藤栄作
- Kyūjitai: 佐藤榮作
- Kana: さとう えいさく
Transcriptions
- Romanization: Satō Eisaku

Eisaku Satō (佐藤 栄作, Satō Eisaku; 27 March 1901 – 3 June 1975) was a Japanese politician who served as prime minister of Japan from 1964 to 1972. He was the third longest-serving and longest-uninterrupted–serving Japanese prime minister. Satō is best remembered for securing the return of Okinawa in 1972, and for winning the Nobel Peace Prize in 1974, which stirred controversy. He was a former elite bureaucrat like his elder brother Nobusuke Kishi and a member of the Yoshida school like Hayato Ikeda. Like his predecessor, he also supported Keynesian economics and a mixed market economy with dirigiste characteristics.

Born in Yamaguchi Prefecture, Satō was a member of the Satō–Kishi–Abe family and the younger brother of prime minister Nobusuke Kishi. Satō graduated from Tokyo Imperial University in 1924 and joined the Ministry of Railways. After the war, he entered the National Diet in 1949 as a member of the Liberal Party, and served in a series of cabinet positions under Shigeru Yoshida, including posts and telecommunications minister from 1951 to 1952, construction minister from 1952 to 1953, and chief cabinet secretary from 1953 to 1954. Satō later joined the Liberal Democratic Party and became finance minister from 1958 to 1960 under Nobusuke Kishi and international trade and industry minister from 1961 to 1962 under Hayato Ikeda.

In 1964, Satō succeeded Ikeda as LDP president and prime minister. He had the support of Japanese business and finance, and presided over a period of rapid economic growth. In foreign policy, he oversaw the normalization of diplomatic relations with South Korea and maintained close relations with the United States, allowing the U.S.–Japan Security Treaty to renew in 1970 and arranging for the return of Okinawa to Japan in 1972. In 1967, Satō introduced the "Three Non-Nuclear Principles" (the non-production, non-possession, and non-introduction of nuclear weapons), and in 1968 signed the Nuclear Non-Proliferation Treaty, for which he won the Nobel Peace Prize. However, it was later revealed that Satō had made secret agreements with the U.S. to allow violations of the principles. Facing mounting economic problems and falling approval ratings in the early 1970s, Satō resigned in 1972 and was succeeded as prime minister by Kakuei Tanaka, quickly losing his political influence when his protégé Takeo Fukuda did not succeed him.

== Early life ==
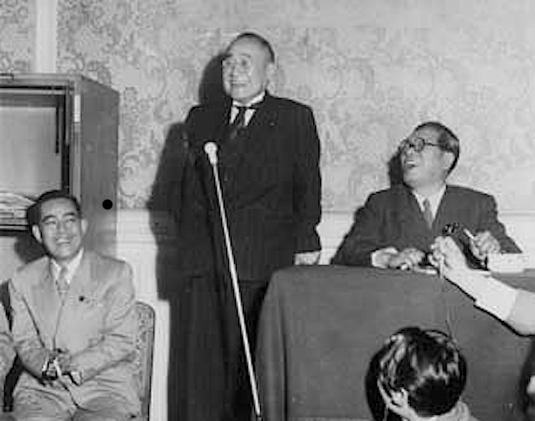
From left Sato (then Minister of Construction), Prime Minister Shigeru Yoshida and Party chairman Saeki Ozawa (1953)

Satō was born on 27 March 1901, in Tabuse, Yamaguchi Prefecture, the third son of businessman Hidesuke Satō and his wife Moyo. His father had worked in the Yamaguchi Prefectural Office, but quit in 1898, and started a sake brewing business in Kishida, Tabuse. The family had a history in sake brewing and had held the right for sake brewing for generations. Satō's great-grandfather was a samurai of the Chōshū Domain, with their outsized influence in Meiji era Japan, with more Meiji and Taisho prime ministers coming from Yamaguchi than any other prefecture. His two older brothers were Ichirō Satō, who would become a vice admiral, and Nobusuke Kishi, who served as prime minister from 1957 to 1960.

Satō studied German law at Tokyo Imperial University and in 1923, passed the senior civil service examinations. Upon graduation the following year, he became a civil servant in the Ministry of Railways. He served as Director of the Osaka Railways Bureau from 1944 to 1946 and Vice-Minister for Transport from 1947 to 1948.

== Political career ==
Satō entered the National Diet in 1949 as a member of the Liberal Party.

He served as Minister of Postal Services and Telecommunications from July 1951 to July 1952. Sato gradually rose through the ranks of Japanese politics, becoming chief cabinet secretary to then prime minister Shigeru Yoshida from January 1953 to July 1954. He later served as minister of construction from October 1952 to February 1953.

After the Liberal Party merged with the Japan Democratic Party to form the Liberal Democratic Party, Satō served as chairman of the party executive council from December 1957 to June 1958, followed by a post as minister of finance in the cabinet of his brother Nobusuke Kishi from 1958 to 1960. As minister of finance, Sato requested the US to fund conservatives.

Satō also served in the cabinets of Kishi's successor as prime minister, Hayato Ikeda. From July 1961 to July 1962, Satō was Minister of International Trade and Industry. From July 1963 to June 1964 he was concurrently head of the Hokkaidō Development Agency and of the Science and Technology Agency.

== Premiership (1964–1972) ==
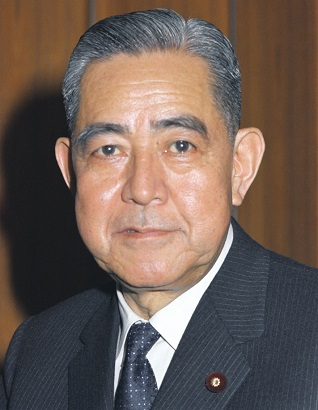
- Premiership of Eisaku Satō; 9 November 1964 – 7 July 1972
- Monarch: Emperor Shōwa
- Cabinet: First Satō Cabinet; Second Satō Cabinet; Third Satō Cabinet
- Party: Liberal Democratic
- Election: 1967; 1969
- Seat: Naikaku Sōri Daijin Kantei
- Constituency: Yamaguchi 2nd
- Emblem of the Prime Minister

Satō succeeded Ikeda after the latter resigned due to ill health. He would go on to serve the longest stint of any prime minister up until that time, and by the late 1960s he appeared to have single-handed control over the entire Japanese government. He was a popular prime minister due to the growing economy; his foreign policy, which was a balancing act between the interests of the United States and China, was more tenuous, and his grip on domestic politics was challenged by growing opposition to his administration's support for the American military operations in Vietnam.

=== Foreign policy ===
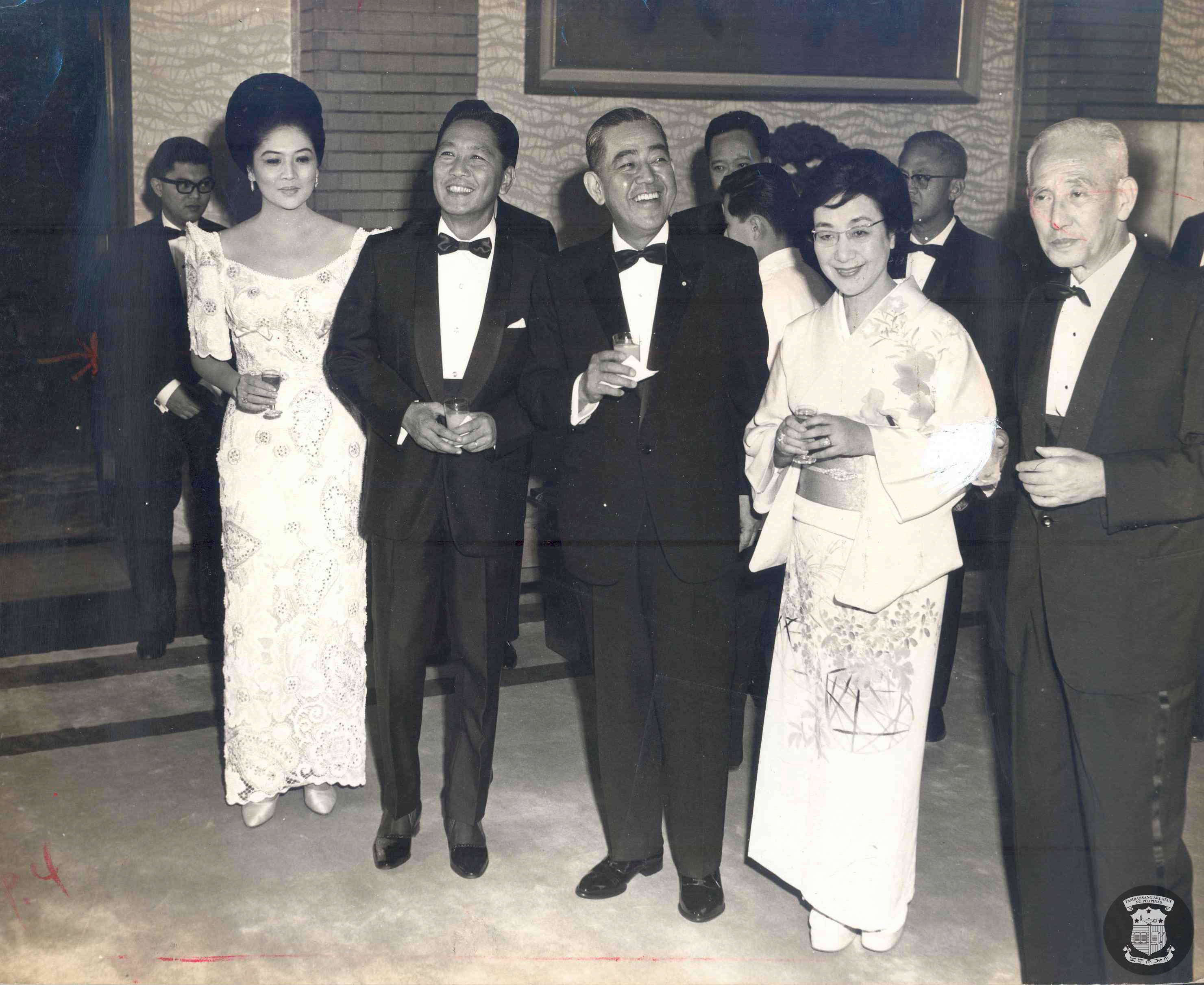
Satō and his wife with Ferdinand and Imelda Marcos

==== China and Taiwan ====
Satō is the last Prime minister of Japan to visit Taiwan during his term. In 1965, Satō approved a US$150 million loan to Taiwan. He visited Taipei in September 1967. In 1969, Satō insisted that the defense of Taiwan was necessary for the safety of Japan. Satō followed the United States in most major issues, but Satō opposed the Nixon visit to China. Satō also bitterly opposed the entry of the PRC into the United Nations in 1971.

==== South Korea ====
On 22 June 1965, the Satō government and South Korea under Park Chung Hee signed the Treaty on Basic Relations Between Japan and the Republic of Korea, which normalized relations between Japan and South Korea for the first time. Relations with Japan had previously not been officially established since Korea's decolonization and division at the end of World War II.

==== Southeast Asia ====
During Satō's term, Japan participated in the creation of the Asian Development Bank in 1966 and held a ministerial level conference on Southeast Asian economic development. It was the first international conference sponsored by the Japanese government in the postwar period. In 1967, he was also the first Japanese prime minister to visit Singapore. He was largely supportive of the South Vietnamese government throughout the Vietnam War.

=== Okinawan reversion ===
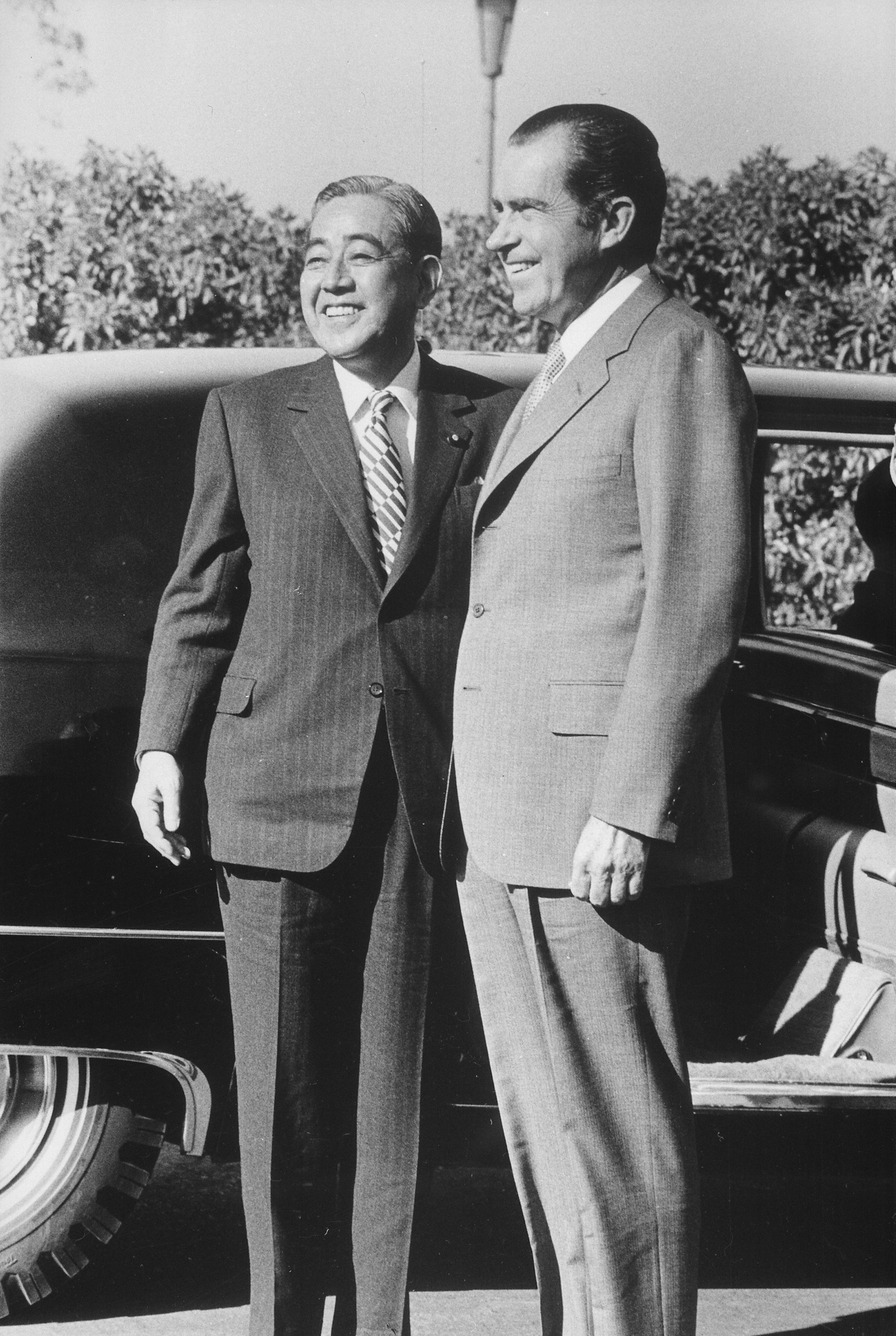
Satō negotiated with U.S. president Richard Nixon for the repatriation of Okinawa

Since the end of the Second World War, Okinawa had been occupied by the United States. While visiting the United States in January 1965, Satō openly asked President Lyndon Johnson to return Okinawa to Japan. In August 1965, Satō became the first post-war prime minister of Japan to visit Okinawa.

In 1969, Satō struck a deal with U.S. president Richard Nixon to repatriate Okinawa: this deal was controversial because it allowed the U.S. forces in Japan to maintain bases in Okinawa after repatriation. Okinawa was formally returned to Japan on 15 May 1972, which also included the Senkaku Islands (also known as the Diaoyu Islands in China and the subject, since 1971, of a Sino-Japanese sovereignty dispute; see Senkaku Islands dispute).

=== Nuclear affairs ===
In his early years as prime minister, Sato had argued that Japan needed to develop nuclear weapons of its own to match those of China, but the United States government was staunchly opposed to this, and the Johnson administration pressured Japan to sign the Nuclear Non-Proliferation Treaty.

Accordingly, Satō introduced the Three Non-Nuclear Principles on 11 December 1967, promising the non-production, non-possession, and non-introduction of nuclear weapons inside Japan. Thereafter, Satō shepherded Japan's entry into the Nuclear Non-Proliferation Treaty and the Diet passed a resolution formally adopting the Non-Nuclear Principles in 1971. For these actions, Satō would receive the Nobel Peace Prize as a co-recipient in 1974.

However, recent inquiries show that behind the scenes, Satō was more accommodating towards US plans of stationing nuclear weapons on Japanese soil. In December 2008, the Japanese government declassified a document showing that during a visit to the US in January 1965, he was discussing with US officials the possibility of using nuclear weapons against the People's Republic of China. In December 2009, his son reported that his father agreed in a November 1969 conversation with US President Nixon to allow the stationing of nuclear warheads in Okinawa even after it was restored to Japanese sovereignty.

=== 1968–1969 University crisis ===
Overcrowded universities, increasing student radicalization, hopes for an abrogation of the US-Japan Security Treaty after its initial 10-year term ended in 1970, and growing opposition to Japan's material and ideological support for America's war in Vietnam helped precipitate large scale protests at hundreds of Japanese schools and universities in 1968–1969, part of a worldwide protest cycle in 1968. After more than a year of conflict, Satō's administration responded by calling in riot police to forcibly clear the university campuses. Thereafter, Satō allowed the Security Treaty to automatically renew in 1970, dashing the hopes of activist groups who staged large street protests in an attempt to eliminate it.

=== Nixon shocks and resignation ===
The successful resolution of the university crisis, continued robust economic growth, and above all, the 1969 announcement of the United States' commitment to return Okinawa to Japan, made Satō broadly popular with the Japanese public and allowed him to win a then unprecedented third consecutive term as prime minister. However, Satō's popularity soon nosedived, in the aftermath of so-called "Nixon Shocks" of 1971. In July 1971, the Japanese government was stunned by Nixon's dramatic announcement of his forthcoming visit to the People's Republic of China. Many Japanese were chagrined by the failure of the United States to consult in advance with Japan before making such a fundamental change in foreign policy, and the sudden change in America's stance made Satō's staunch adherence to non-relations with China look like he had been played for a fool.

The following month, the government was again surprised to learn that, without prior consultation, Nixon was imposing a 10 percent surcharge on imports, a decision explicitly aimed at hindering Japan's exports to the United States, and was unilaterally suspending the convertibility of dollars into gold, which would eventually lead to the collapse of the Bretton Woods system of fixed currency exchange rates. The resulting decoupling of the yen and the dollar led the yen to soar in value, significantly damaging Japan's international trade and economic outlook.

With his approval ratings plummeting, Satō abandoned plans to run for a fourth term, and resigned from office in 1972. His heir apparent, Takeo Fukuda, won the Sato faction's support in the subsequent LDP presidential election, but the more popular MITI minister, Kakuei Tanaka, won the vote, ending the Satō faction's longstanding dominance in Diet politics.

== Later life ==
Upon leaving the premiership in 1972 to an approval rating of 19% (by April) and a fractured party, Satō moved back to his home in Setagaya Ward, Tokyo, staying out of the eyes of the media but remaining in the Diet. His reputation, however, quickly began to be rehabilitated, starting in November of that year with his awarding of the Grand Cordon of the Supreme Order of the Chrysanthemum. Satō opened up to the media after the award, with outlets noting his visual image change, with a longer hairstyle reminiscent of the post-presidency of Lyndon B. Johnson.

Satō quickly settled into his life as an elder statesman. In January 1973, Satō and his wife were invited to President Richard Nixon's second inauguration. Satō maintained close relations with Nixon, sending him his personal condolences upon his resignation, and Nixon attended his funeral.

Upon returning to Japan, his successor, the initially-popular Kakuei Tanaka, who had been handed a rebuke with 17 seat losses in the 1972 Japanese general election, looked to Satō to repair relations within the LDP, especially towards his rival Takeo Fukuda. Both men were Satō's protégés, and Satō advised Tanaka in the forming of his post-election cabinet, notably including Fukuda as director-general of the Administrative Agency. Although privately critical towards Tanaka's government, Satō remained in the public eye a unifier within the LDP.

Satō shared the Nobel Peace Prize with Seán MacBride in 1974. He was awarded for representing the Japanese people's will for peace, and for signing the nuclear arms Non-Proliferation Treaty in 1970. He was the first Asian to accept the Nobel Peace Prize. (In 1973, Vietnamese politician Le Duc Tho had become the first Asian to win the prize, but Tho had rejected it.) Satō began working with MacBride shortly after, joining Amnesty International.

In April 1975, as part of his last foreign visit before his death, Satō was chosen as the LDP representative to attend the funeral of Chiang Kai-Shek. However, upon protest from the Chinese government of Satō's role as "official envoy of the LDP president", his role was relegated to a "friendship representative".

== Death ==
On 19 May 1975, Satō attended a dinner in Shikiraku, a restaurant in Tokyo's Tsukiji district, attended by Fukuda. During the event, he suffered a massive stroke, resulting in a coma. He was held in an emergency unit in the restaurant for four days before being moved to hospital. He died at 12:55 a.m. on 3 June at the Jikei University Medical Center, aged 74. After a public funeral, his ashes were buried in the family cemetery at Tabuse.

Satō was posthumously honored with the Collar of the Order of the Chrysanthemum, the highest honor in the Japanese honors system.

== Personal life ==
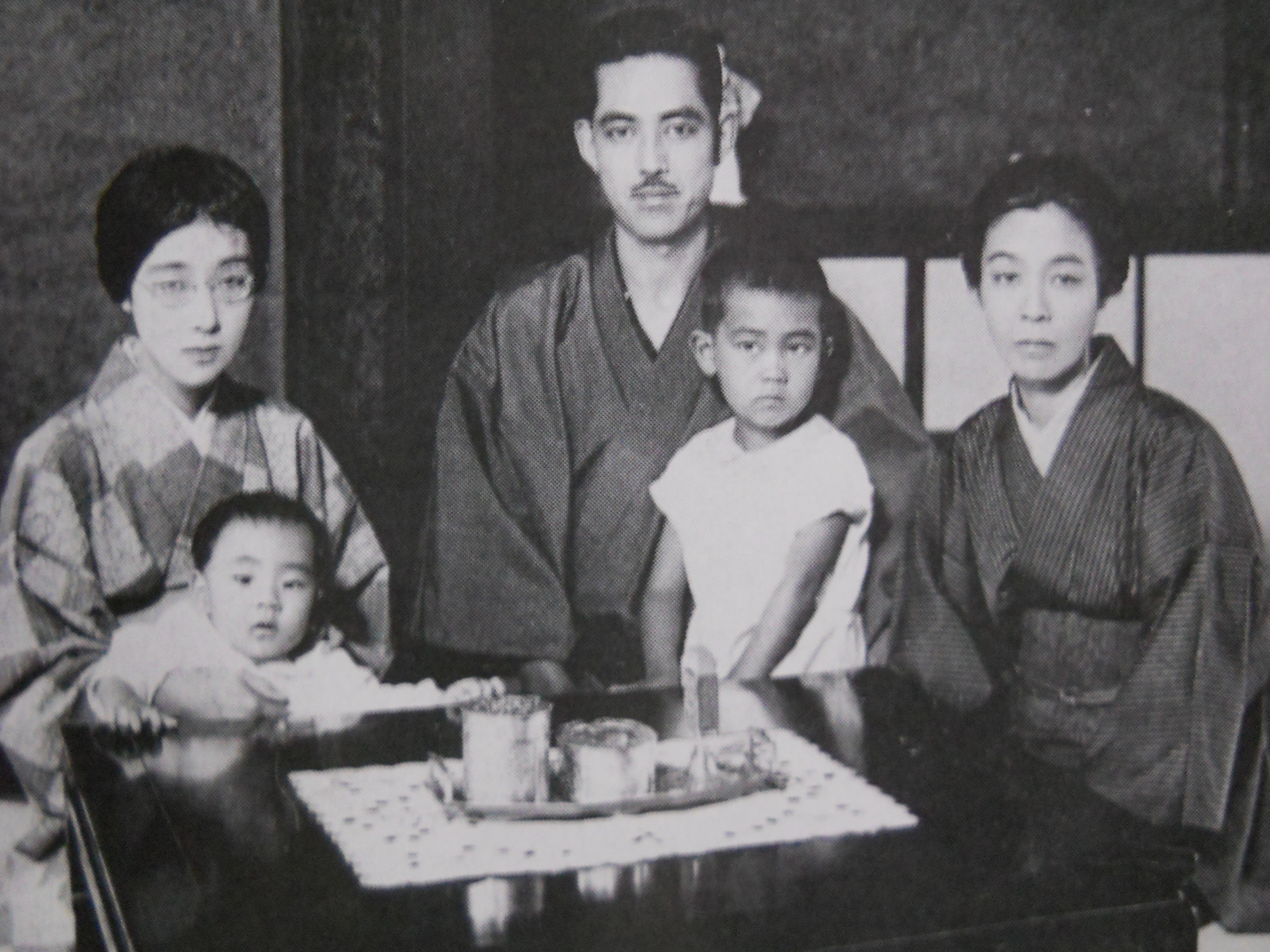
From left – Hiroko, Shinji, Eisaku, Ryūtarō, & Fujie (Matsuoka), 1931

Satō married Hiroko Satō (佐藤 寛子; 5 January 1907 – 16 April 1987) in 1926 and had two sons, Ryūtarō and Shinji. Hiroko's father, Matsusuke Satō, was Eisaku's maternal uncle and the head of main Satō family. After Matsusuke died in 1911, Hiroko, her sister and mother were supported by her maternal uncle, diplomat Yōsuke Matsuoka. Their son Shinji followed his father into politics, serving in both houses and as a cabinet minister. Shinji's son-in-law, Masashi Adachi, currently serves in the House of Councillors, and formerly worked as an aide for his cousin-in-law, Eisaku's grandnephew, Shinzo Abe.

In a 1969 Shukan Asahi interview with novelist Shūsaku Endō, Hiroko accused Satō of being a rake and a wife-beater. His hobbies included golf, fishing, and the Japanese tea ceremony. Nobusuke Kishi (his older brother) and Shinzō Abe (his grandnephew) were also both prime ministers.

== Family tree ==
SATO-KISHI-ABE (佐藤-岸-安倍) Family Tree

Female Male

SHIN Soroku Kuge Judge (1844–1928)	MATSUOKA Gorozaemon (c.1773–1831)	KUNIHIRO Jirozaemon (c.1733–1853)	SATO Nobuhiro Governor of Shimane (1816–1900)	Marquess; Inoue Kaoru (Note: House of Peers) (great-great uncle to KISHI Nakako) (1836-1915)
Gensui; Prince FUSHIMI Hiroyasu (1875–1946)	SHIBA Kuma (married Baron SHIBA Chuzaburo)	SHIN Keita; Ishikawajima Shipyard	MATSUOKA Yu (OGAWA) (1844–1936)	MATSUOKA Sanjuro; Shipping Magnate (1831–1893)	MATSUOKA Oko (KUNIHIRO) (c.1840–1866)	SATO Mine (KUNIHIRO) (c.1840-c.1873)	SATO Nobuhiko Yamaguchi Assembly (1840–1898)	KISHI Yozo	Viscount; Yoshimasa Oshima Governor-General (1850–1926)
Marquis; KACHO Hironobuo Peer (1905–1970)	Baron; SHIBA Masao Peer (1902–1983)	MATSUOKA Ryuko (SHIN) (c.1849-c.1909)	MATSUOKA Yosuke Foreign Minister (Note: Yamaguchi 2nd district (1928–1942)) (1880–1946)	MATSUOKA Kensuke (1875-??)	SATO Fujieda (MATSUOKA) (1884–1944)	Dr SATO Matsusuke (1877–1911)	SATO Shigeyo "Moyo" (1873–1932)	SATO Hidesuke (c.1830–1884)	KISHI Nobumasa	ABE Hyōsuke Heki Nanushi	HONDO Hideko (OSHIMA)
MATSUOKA Haruko (KACHO) (1934- )	MATSUOKA Shinzo; Sumitomo (1923–2010)	TAJIMA Shuko (married TAJIMA Joji)	MATSUOKA Kenichiro; TV Executive (1914–1994)	MATSUOKA Mitsuo Hikari Mayor (1903–1971)	SATO Hiroko (1907–1987)	SATO Eisaku Prime Minister (Note: Yamaguchi 2nd district (1947–1993)) (1901–1975)	SATO Ichiro Navy Vice Admiral (1889–1958)	KISHI Nobusuke Prime Minister (1897–1987)	KISHI Yoshiko (1901–1980)	ABE Kan Representative (Note: Yamaguchi 1st district (pre-1996)) (1894–1946)	ABE Shizuko (HONDO)
MATSUOKA Shizuko (Sakamoto)	MATSUOKA Masuno Councillor (Note: Yamaguchi Councillors district) (1934–2024)	SATO Kazuko (ANZAI)	SATO Shinji Foreign Minister (Note: Yamaguchi 2nd district) (1932–2016)	KISHI Nakako (grand-niece of Genrō INOUE Kaoru)	KISHI Nobukazu; Seibu Oil (1921–2017)	ABE Yoko (KISHI) (1928–2024)	ABE Shintaro Foreign Minister (1924–1991)
ADACHI Masahi Councillor (Note: Councillors At-Large) (1959- )	ADACHI Mika (SATO)	KISHI Nobuo Minister of Defense (1959- )	ABE Hironobu; Mitsubishi (1952- )	ABE Sachiko (Ushio)	ABE Shinzo Prime Minister (Note: Yamaguchi 4th district) (1954–2022)	ABE Akie (MATSUZAKI) (1962- )
Abe no Yoritoki Heian-era ABE ancestor (c.1011–1057)	SATO Tadanobu Heian-era SATO ancestor (1153–1186)	KISHI Nobuchiyo Representative (1991- )	KISHI Tomohiro	ABE Hiroto	ABE Mariko

- = Member of the Imperial Family (until 1947)
- = Chōshū Samurai Family (until 1869)
- = Kaga Samurai Family (until 1869)
- = Prime Minister of Japan
- = Member of Diet
- = Yamaguchi Prefectural Assembly

Parliamentary Districts:

== Honours ==
Satō received the following awards:

- Golden Pheasant Award of the Scout Association of Japan (1970)
- Grand Cordon of the Order of the Chrysanthemum (3 November 1972)
- Nobel Peace Prize (11 December 1974)
- Collar of the Order of the Chrysanthemum (3 June 1975; posthumous)
- Junior First Rank (3 June 1975)

=== Foreign honours ===
- Spain: Knight Grand Cross of the Order of Isabella the Catholic (23 February 1965)
- Laos: Order of the Million Elephants and the White Parasol (1966)
- Argentina: Grand Cross of the Order of the Liberator General San Martín (9 September 1966)
- Malaysia: Honorary Grand Commander of the Order of the Defender of the Realm (S.M.N.) (1967)
- Singapore: The Order of Temasek (25 September 1967)
- Indonesia: Star of the Republic of Indonesia, 2nd Class (28 March 1968)
- West Germany: Grand Cross 1st Class of the Order of Merit of the Federal Republic of Germany (19 May 1969)
- South Korea: Order of Diplomatic Service Merit (14 August 1969)
- Mexico: Sash of the Order of the Aztec Eagle (9 March 1972)
- Paraguay: Grand Cross of National Order of Merit (5 April 1972)
- Nicaragua: Grand Cross of the Order of Rubén Darío with gold plaque (30 May 1972)

== See also ==
- List of Japanese Nobel laureates
- List of Nobel laureates affiliated with the University of Tokyo

Political offices
Preceded by Gizo Tomabechi	Chief Cabinet Secretary; 1948–1949	Succeeded by Kaneshichi Masuda
Preceded by Bunkichi Tamura	Minister of Posts and Telecommunications; 1951–1952	Succeeded by Sotaro Takase
Preceded by Bunkichi Tamura	Minister of Telecommunications; 1951–1952	Succeeded by Post abolished
Preceded by Uichi Noda	Minister of Construction; 1952–1953	Succeeded by Kuichiro Totsuka
Preceded by Uichi Noda	Head of the Hokkaido Development Agency; 1952–1953	Succeeded by Kuichiro Totsuka
Preceded by Hisato Ichimada	Minister of Finance; 1958–1960	Succeeded by Mikio Mizuta
Preceded by Etsusaburo Shiina	Minister of International Trade and Industry; 1961–1962	Succeeded by Hajime Fukuda
Preceded by Tsuruyo Kondo	Head of the Science and Technology Agency; 1963–1964	Succeeded by Hayato Ikeda
Preceded by Shojiro Kawashima	Head of the Hokkaido Development Agency; 1963–1964	Succeeded by Hayato Ikeda
Preceded by Hayato Ikeda	Prime Minister of Japan; 1964–1972	Succeeded by Kakuei Tanaka
Party political offices
Preceded by Takayoshi Aoki	Chairman of the Policy Research Council, Democratic Liberal Party; 1949–1950	Merged into Liberal Party
New political party	Chairman of the Policy Research Council, Liberal Party; 1950	Succeeded by Ryūtarō Nemoto
Preceded by Jōji Hayashi	Secretary General of the Liberal Party; 1950–1951	Succeeded by Kaneshichi Masuda
Preceded by Kozen Hirokawa	Secretary General of the Liberal Party; 1953–1954	Succeeded by Hayato Ikeda
Preceded by Shigemasa Sunada	Chairman of the General Council, Liberal Democratic Party; 1957–1958	Succeeded by Ichirō Kōno
Preceded by Hayato Ikeda	President of the Liberal Democratic Party; 1964–1972	Succeeded by Kakuei Tanaka
