= Jōji Hayashi =

Japanese politician (1889–1960)

- 林 譲治
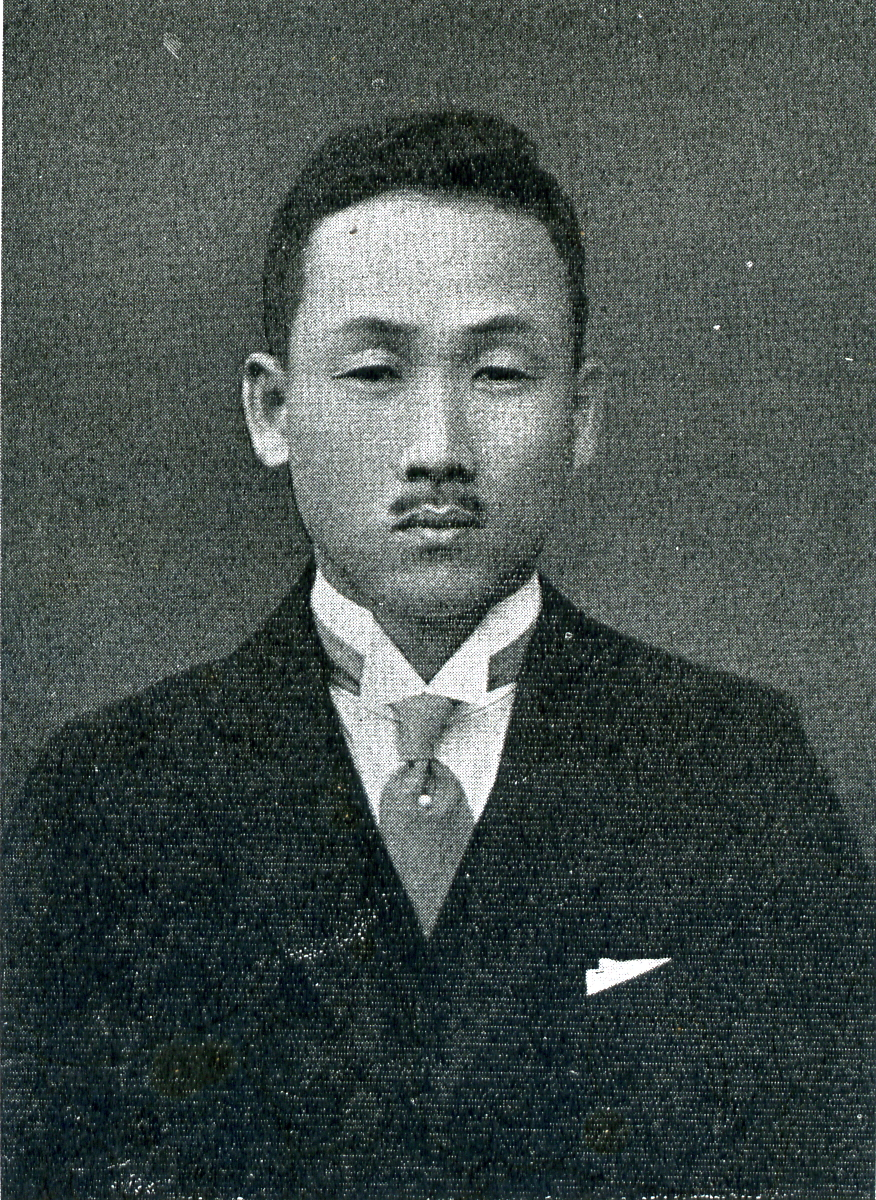
- Hayashi in 1932

Speaker of the House of Representatives
- In office 13 March 1951 – 1 August 1952
- Monarch: Hirohito
- Deputy: Nobuyuki Iwamoto
- Preceded by: Kijūrō Shidehara
- Succeeded by: Banboku Ōno

Deputy Prime Minister of Japan
- In office 19 October 1948 – 13 March 1951
- Prime Minister: Shigeru Yoshida
- Preceded by: Suehiro Nishio
- Succeeded by: Taketora Ogata (1952)
Ministerial offices
Minister of Health and Welfare
In office 19 October 1948 – 28 June 1950
Prime Minister	Shigeru Yoshida
Preceded by	Giichi Takeda
Succeeded by	Takeo Kurokawa
Chief Cabinet Secretary
In office 29 May 1946 – 24 May 1947
Prime Minister	Shigeru Yoshida
Preceded by	Wataru Narahashi
Succeeded by	Suehiro Nishio

Member of the House of Representatives
- In office 10 April 1946 – 5 April 1960
- Preceded by: Constituency established
- Succeeded by: Tadao Kariya
- Constituency: Kōchi at-large
- In office 20 February 1930 – 29 April 1942
- Preceded by: Shirō Sakamoto
- Succeeded by: Giichi Ono
- Constituency: Kōchi 2nd

Personal details
- Born: 24 March 1889 Sukumo, Kōchi, Japan
- Died: 5 April 1960 (aged 71)
- Party: Liberal Democratic (after 1955)
- Other political affiliations: Rikken Seiyūkai (1930–1940); Independent (1940–1945); JLP (1945–1948); DLP (1948–1950); LP (1950–1955)
- Parent: Hayashi Yūzō (father)
- Education: Kyoto Imperial University

Jōji Hayashi (林 譲治, Hayashi Jōji; 24 March 1889 – 5 April 1960) was a Japanese politician who served as the Speaker of the House of Representatives from 1951 to 1952, and Deputy Prime Minister of Japan from 1948 to 1951 during Shigeru Yoshida's premiership. Prior to this he served as the Minister of Health and Welfare from 1948 to 1950, and Chief Cabinet Secretary from 1946 to 1947.

== Early life and education ==
Hayashi was born in Sukumo, Kōchi on 24 March 1889, as the second son of Hayashi Yūzō, a politician of the Meiji and Taishō periods who was also active in the Freedom and People's Rights Movement.

In 1918, he graduated from the Graduate School of Law and Faculty of Law, Kyoto University.

== Political career ==
In 1923, Hayashi became the mayor of Sukumo, and was later elected as a member of the Kōchi Prefectural Assembly in 1927.

In the 1930 election, he was elected to the House of Representatives as a member of the Rikken Seiyūkai. In 1931, he became secretary to future prime minister Ichirō Hatoyama, who at the time was the Minister of Education in the Inukai cabinet. During the 1939 split of the Rikken Seiyūkai, he belonged to the orthodox faction along with Hatoyama, and after the dissolution of the party the following year, he became critical of the Imperial Rule Assistance Association.

After the war, he became Chief Cabinet Secretary in the First Yoshida cabinet in 1946. He was later appointed as Deputy Prime Minister and Minister of Health and Welfare in the Second and Third Yoshida cabinets. In 1951, he became Speaker of the House of Representatives, and served in that position until the following year.

Hayashi died on 5 April 1960 at the age of 71, due to complications from cancer. At the time of his death he was still in office as a Diet member.
