= Shūji Masutani =

Japanese politician and lawyer (1888–1973)

- 益谷 秀次
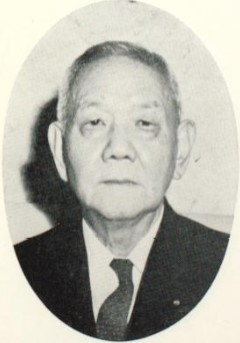
- Masutani in 1963

Deputy Prime Minister of Japan
- In office 18 June 1959 – 19 July 1960
- Prime Minister: Nobusuke Kishi
- Preceded by: Mitsujirō Ishii (1958)
- Succeeded by: Ichirō Kōno (1964)

Speaker of the House of Representatives
- In office 18 March 1955 – 25 April 1958
- Monarch: Hirohito
- Deputy: Motojirō Sugiyama
- Preceded by: Tō Matsunaga
- Succeeded by: Nirō Hoshijima

Minister of Construction
- In office 19 October 1948 – 6 May 1950
- Prime Minister: Shigeru Yoshida
- Preceded by: Sasayoshi Hitotsumatsu
- Succeeded by: Kaneshichi Masuda
Party political offices
Secretary-General of the Liberal Democratic Party
In office July 1960 – July 1961
President	Hayato Ikeda
Preceded by	Kawashima Shojiro
Succeeded by	Shigesaburō Maeo

Member of the House of Representatives
- In office 10 April 1946 – 13 November 1972
- Preceded by: Constituency established
- Succeeded by: Riki Kawara
- Constituency: Ishikawa at-large (1946–1947); Ishikawa 2nd (1947–1972)
- In office 20 February 1932 – 21 March 1937
- Preceded by: Ryōsuke Tobe
- Succeeded by: Kenzō Aoyama
- Constituency: Ishikawa 2nd
- In office 10 May 1920 – 31 January 1924
- Preceded by: Constituency established
- Succeeded by: Minoru Satō
- Constituency: Ishikawa 5th

Personal details
- Born: 17 January 1888 Fugeshi, Ishikawa, Japan
- Died: 18 August 1973 (aged 85) Noto, Ishikawa, Japan
- Party: Liberal Democratic
- Other political affiliations: Rikken Seiyūkai (1920–1924; 1927–1940); Seiyūhontō (1924–1927); JLP (1945–1948); DLP (1948–1950); LP (1950–1955)
- Education: Tokyo Imperial University; Kyoto Imperial University
- Awards: Order of the Rising Sun

Shūji Masutani (益谷 秀次, Masutani Shūji; 17 January 1888 – 18 August 1973) was a Japanese jurist and politician who was a member of the Liberal Democratic Party. He served at the House of Representatives for more than 26 years.

== Biography ==
Masutani was born in Ushitsu Town, Ishikawa Prefecture, on 17 January 1888. He was a graduate of both the University of Tokyo and Kyoto University.

Masutani joined the Rikken Seiyūkai in the 1920s. He was part of the factions led by Shigeru Yoshida and then by Hayato Ikeda. Masutani served as the chairman of the executive board of the party between 1950 and 1952. He was elected to the House of Representatives many times.

Masutani held various posts, including secretary to the president of the board of census, parliamentary vice minister of foreign affairs and construction minister under Prime Minister Shigeru Yoshida. In 1951 he was appointed state minister to the cabinet led by Shigeru Yoshida, but he was soon dropped from the office. Between 1955 and 1958 he served as speaker of the House of Representatives on behalf of the newly founded Liberal Democratic Party (LDP). In the period between 1959 and 1960 he was the deputy prime minister, minister of state and director of the administrative management agency in the cabinet led by Prime Minister Nobusuke Kishi.

Masutani was a close associate and loyal ally of Prime Minister Hayato Ikeda, but was also seen as more friendly to liberal causes. He therefore became useful to Ikeda in heading off challenges and criticism from both the left-wing opposition parties and factional rivals within the LDP. For example, in January 1961, Ikeda appointed Masutani chairman of the Organizational Investigative Committee to defuse claims from rivals that he was not adequately committed to modernizing the LDP's organizational structure. Similarly, later that same year, he was appointed chairman of the Investigative Commission on Security, in order to nullify claims from hawks within the LDP that Ikeda was soft on national security but without antagonizing the left-wing parties. Masutani remained in the latter post until 1967, when Naka Funada became the chairman of the commission.

In October 1972 Masutani retired from politics and died of heart attack in Noto, Ishikawa Prefecture, on 18 August 1983.

Masutani was the recipient of the Order of the Rising Sun, First Class Grand Cordon, which was awarded to him 1961.
