= Shinzō Ōya =

Japanese politician

- 大屋 晋三
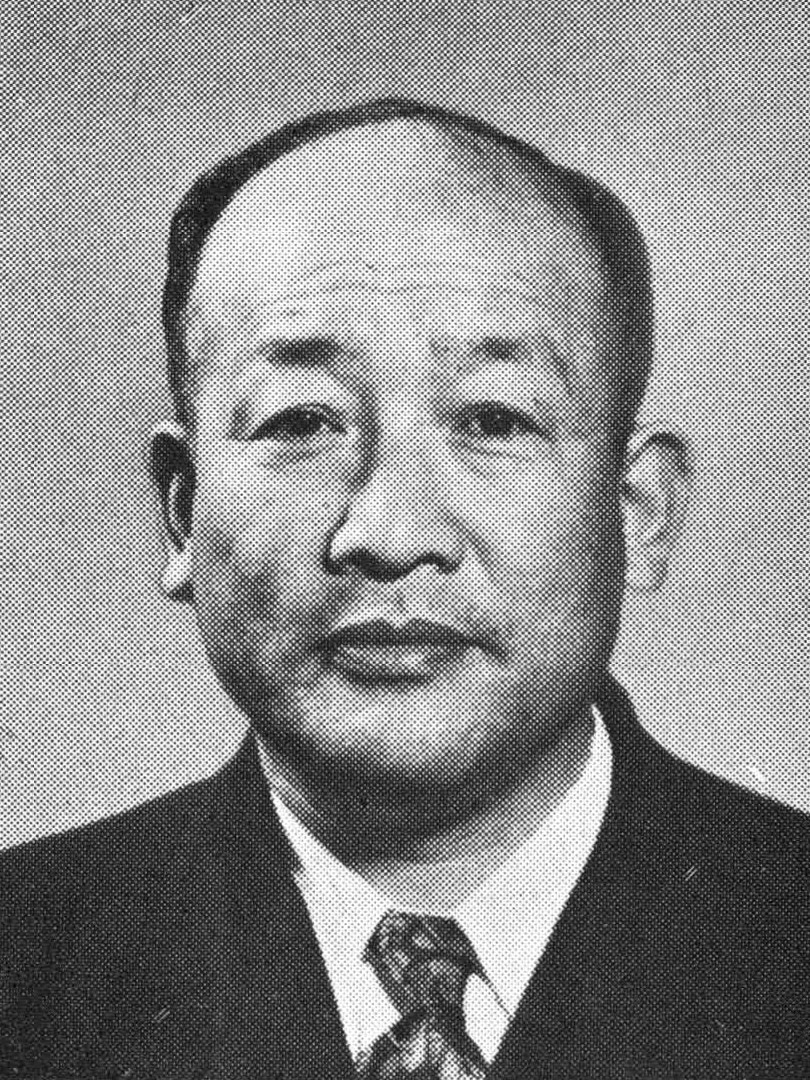
- Ōya in 1953

Minister of Transport
- In office 16 February 1949 – 28 June 1950
- Prime Minister: Shigeru Yoshida
- Preceded by: Saeki Ozawa
- Succeeded by: Takeshi Yamazaki

Acting Minister of Finance
- In office 14 December 1948 – 16 February 1949
- Prime Minister: Shigeru Yoshida
- Preceded by: Sanroku Izumiyama
- Succeeded by: Hayato Ikeda

Minister of Commerce and Industry
- In office 19 October 1948 – 16 February 1949
- Prime Minister: Shigeru Yoshida
- Preceded by: Chōsaburō Mizutani; Shigeru Yoshida (acting)
- Succeeded by: Heitarō Inagaki

Member of the House of Councillors
- In office 3 May 1947 – 3 June 1956
- Preceded by: Constituency established
- Succeeded by: Giichirō Shiraki
- Constituency: Osaka at-large

Personal details
- Born: 5 July 1894 Meiwa, Gunma, Japan
- Died: 9 March 1980 (aged 85)
- Party: LDP (1955–1980)
- Other political affiliations: JLP (1945–1948); DLP (1948–1950); LP (1950–1955)
- Spouse: Masako Ōya
- Education: Tokyo University of Commerce

Shinzō Ōya (大屋 晋三, Ōya Shinzō; 5 July 1894 – 9 March 1980) was an entrepreneur and politician, who served as Minister of Commerce and Industry in post-war Japan.

Ōya was born in what is now part of the town of Meiwa in Gunma Prefecture, where his father was a high school principal and his grandfather had been a samurai in the service of Kawagoe Domain. He graduated from what later became Hitotsubashi University in 1918. On graduation he joined the zaibatsu Suzuki Shoten, and from 1925 went to work for Teijin, eventually becoming its president in November 1945.

In his early career, he was praised as a charismatic manager, who introduced new synthetic fibers which made Teijin a market leader in the fabric industry. However, he later was criticized for over-diversification, and for his refusal to surrender authority over the company despite his obvious mental decline in old age, which led Teijin to the brink of bankruptcy.

In 1947, Ōya was elected to a seat in the Diet of Japan in 1947 Upper House election from the Osaka electoral district, and was reelected for a second term, serving until June 1956 under Liberal Democratic Party (LDP) banner. From 19 October 1948 – 16 February 1949, he was Minister of Commerce and Industry under the 2nd Shigeru Yoshida administration, as well as interim Minister of Finance from 14 December 1948 to 16 February 1949. During the 3rd Yoshida administration, Ōya served as Minister of Transport from 16 February 1949 to 28 June 1950.

Ōya was married to the singer and writer Masako Ōya.

Political offices
Preceded by Shigeru Yoshida; Acting	Minister of Commerce and Industry; 1948–1949	Succeeded by Heitarō Inagaki
Preceded by Sanroku Izumiyama	Minister of Finance; Acting; 1949–1950	Succeeded by Hayato Ikeda
Preceded by Saeki Ozawa	Minister of Transport; 1949–1950	Succeeded by Takeshi Yamazaki
