= 1949 Japanese general election =

- 23 January 1949

All 466 seats in the House of Representatives 234 seats needed for a majority
- Turnout: 74.04% (▲6.09pp)
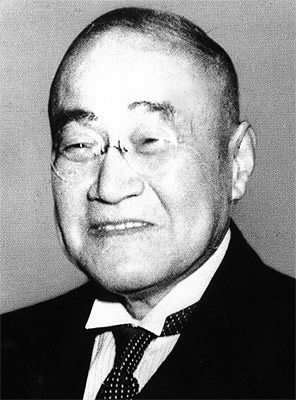

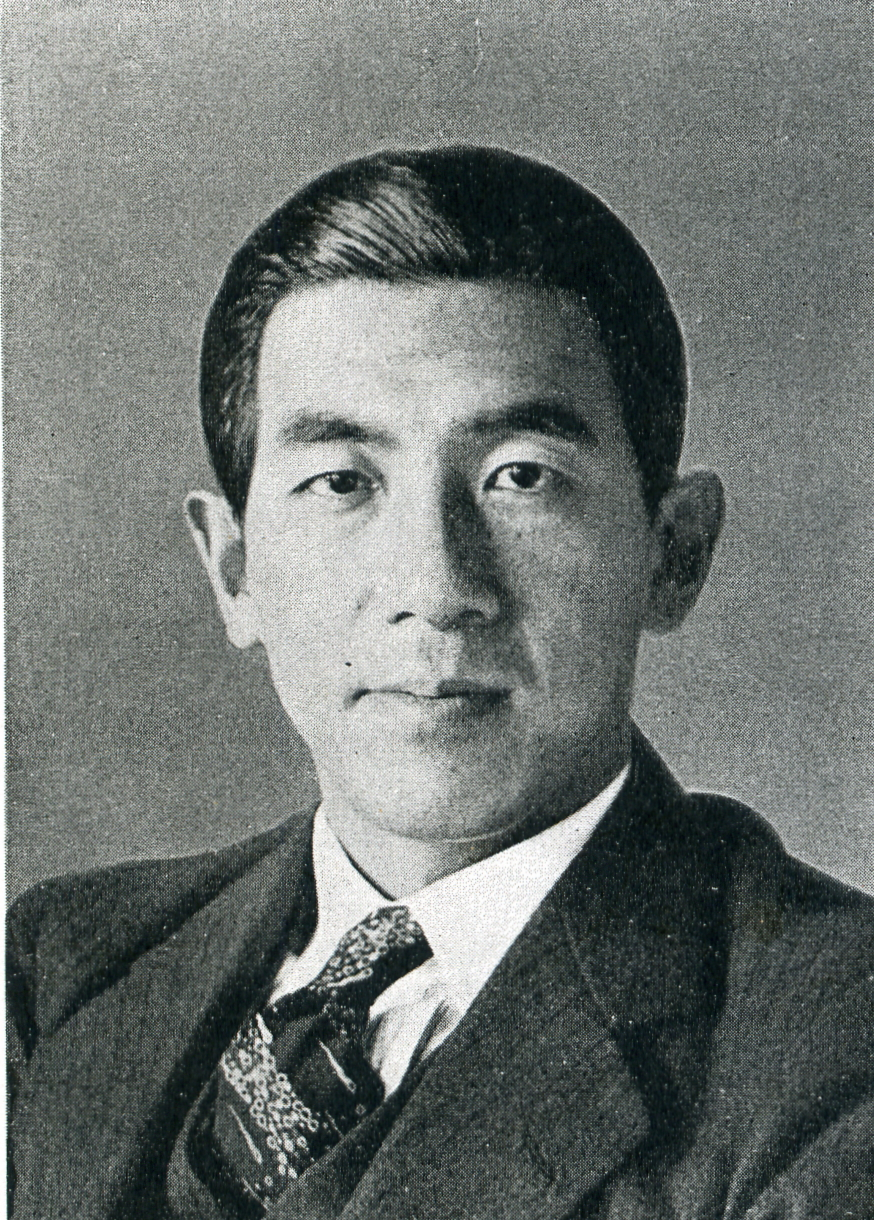

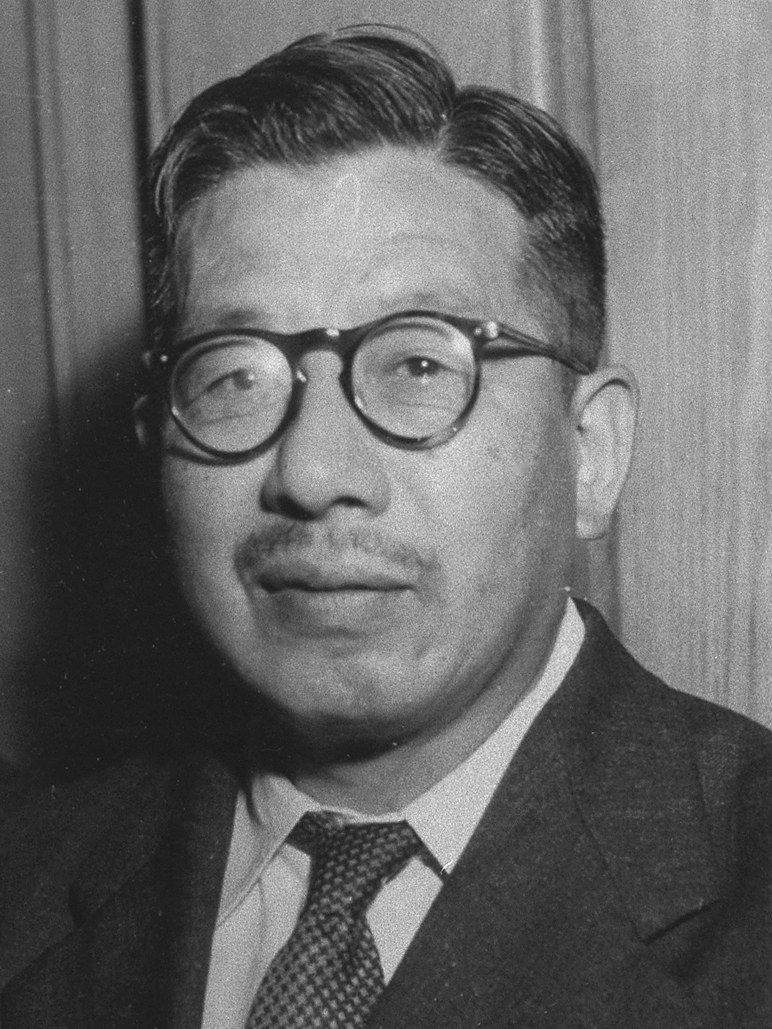

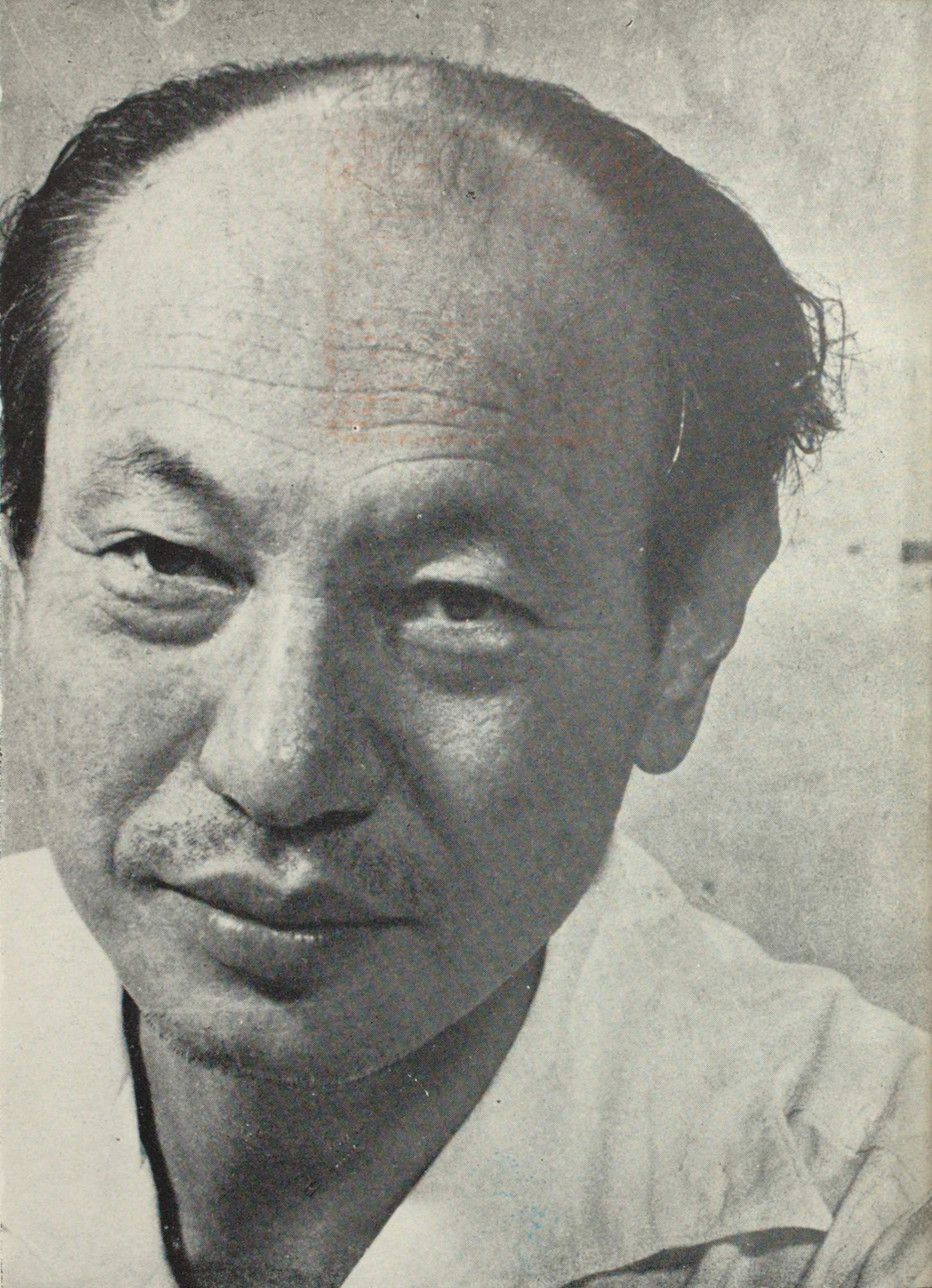

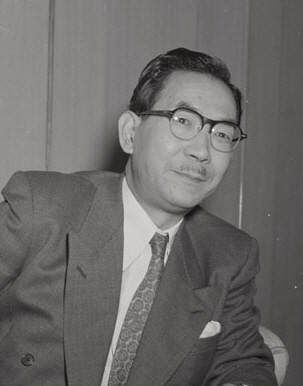

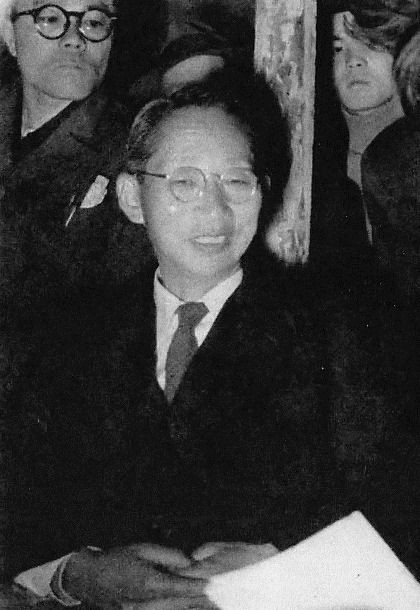
| | First party | Second party | Third party |
|---|---|---|---|
| Leader | Shigeru Yoshida | Takeru Inukai | Tetsu Katayama |
| Party | Democratic Liberal | Democratic | Socialist |
| Last election | – | 25.44%, 124 seats | 26.23%, 143 seats |
| Seats won | 264 | 70 | 48 |
| Seat change | New | ▼54 | ▼95 |
| Popular vote | 13,420,269 | 4,798,352 | 4,129,794 |
| Percentage | 43.87% | 15.68% | 13.50% |
| Swing | New | ▼9.76pp | ▼12.73pp |
| | Fourth party | Fifth party | Sixth party |
| Leader | Kyuichi Tokuda | Takeo Miki | Hisao Kuroda |
| Party | JCP | National Cooperative | Labourers and Farmers |
| Last election | 3.67%, 4 seats | 7.00%, 31 seats | – |
| Seats won | 35 | 14 | 7 |
| Seat change | ▲31 | ▼17 | New |
| Popular vote | 2,984,780 | 1,041,879 | 606,840 |
| Percentage | 9.76% | 3.41% | 1.98% |
| Swing | ▲6.09pp | ▼3.59pp | New |
- Districts shaded according to winners' vote strength
Prime Minister before election
Shigeru Yoshida
Democratic Liberal
Elected Prime Minister
Shigeru Yoshida
Democratic Liberal

General elections were held in Japan on 23 January 1949. The result was a landslide victory for the Democratic Liberal Party, which won 269 of the 466 seats. Voter turnout was 74.0%. It was the first election held following the enactment of the current Constitution of Japan.

Future prime ministers Hayato Ikeda and Eisaku Satō and future Foreign Minister and Chief Cabinet Secretary Katsuo Okazaki were first elected in this election.

The second cabinet of Prime Minister Shigeru Yoshida was formed following the election.

The Japanese Communist Party's best prefecture performance was 20.07% in Osaka and its worst was 2.63% in Kagoshima. This was the best performance of the JCP until the 1972 election.

== Results ==
| Party | Votes | % | Seats | +/– |
|---|---|---|---|---|
| Democratic Liberal Party | 13,420,269 | 43.87 | 264 | New |
| Democratic Party | 4,798,352 | 15.68 | 69 | −55 |
| Japan Socialist Party | 4,129,794 | 13.50 | 48 | −95 |
| Japanese Communist Party | 2,984,780 | 9.76 | 35 | +31 |
| National Cooperative Party | 1,041,879 | 3.41 | 14 | −17 |
| Labourers and Farmers Party | 606,840 | 1.98 | 7 | New |
| Other parties | 1,602,496 | 5.24 | 17 | – |
| Independents | 2,008,109 | 6.56 | 12 | 0 |
| Total | 30,592,519 | 100.00 | 466 | −2 |
| Valid votes | 30,592,519 | 98.13 | | |
| Invalid/blank votes | 582,438 | 1.87 | | |
| Total votes | 31,174,957 | 100.00 | | |
| Registered voters/turnout | 42,105,300 | 74.04 | | |
Source: Oscarsson, Nohlen et al.

=== By prefecture ===
| Prefecture | Total seats | Seats won | | | | | | | |
| Prefecture | Total seats | DLP | DP | JSP | JCP | NCP | LFP | Others | Ind. |
|---|---|---|---|---|---|---|---|---|---|
| Aichi | 19 | 10 | 5 | 1 | 1 | 1 | | 1 | |
| Akita | 8 | 5 | 3 | | | | | | |
| Aomori | 7 | 3 | 3 | | | 1 | | | |
| Chiba | 13 | 11 | 2 | | | | | | |
| Ehime | 9 | 8 | 1 | | | | | | |
| Fukui | 4 | 2 | 2 | | | | | | |
| Fukuoka | 19 | 9 | 2 | 3 | 1 | | | 3 | 1 |
| Fukushima | 12 | 9 | | 3 | | | | | |
| Gifu | 9 | 7 | 1 | 1 | | | | | |
| Gunma | 10 | 4 | 3 | 2 | | | | | 1 |
| Hiroshima | 12 | 7 | | 3 | | 2 | | | |
| Hokkaido | 22 | 11 | 2 | | 1 | | 1 | 7 | |
| Hyōgo | 18 | 10 | 3 | 2 | 2 | 1 | | | |
| Ibaraki | 12 | 7 | 2 | | 1 | | 2 | | |
| Ishikawa | 6 | 3 | 1 | 1 | 1 | | | | |
| Iwate | 8 | 6 | 1 | 1 | | | | | |
| Kagawa | 6 | 1 | 3 | 2 | | | | | |
| Kagoshima | 10 | 9 | 1 | | | | | | |
| Kanagawa | 13 | 5 | 1 | 3 | 3 | | | | 1 |
| Kōchi | 5 | 2 | 2 | | | | | 1 | |
| Kumamoto | 10 | 4 | 4 | 1 | | | | 1 | |
| Kyoto | 10 | 3 | 3 | 1 | 2 | | | 1 | |
| Mie | 9 | 4 | 1 | 1 | | | | | 3 |
| Miyagi | 9 | 6 | 2 | 1 | | | | | |
| Miyazaki | 6 | 5 | 1 | | | | | | |
| Nagano | 13 | 8 | 2 | | 1 | 2 | | | |
| Nagasaki | 9 | 7 | 1 | | | | | | 1 |
| Nara | 5 | 2 | 1 | | 1 | | | | 1 |
| Niigata | 15 | 8 | 1 | 3 | 1 | | 1 | 1 | |
| Ōita | 7 | 5 | 1 | | | | | | 1 |
| Okayama | 10 | 5 | 2 | | 1 | | 2 | | |
| Osaka | 19 | 10 | | 5 | 4 | | | | |
| Saga | 5 | 3 | 2 | | | | | | |
| Saitama | 13 | 9 | | 1 | 2 | | | | 1 |
| Shiga | 5 | 2 | | 1 | 1 | 1 | | | |
| Shimane | 5 | 1 | 2 | 1 | 1 | | | | |
| Shizuoka | 14 | 9 | 1 | 1 | 1 | 1 | | | 1 |
| Tochigi | 10 | 7 | 1 | 1 | | 1 | | | |
| Tokushima | 5 | 3 | | | | 2 | | | |
| Tokyo | 27 | 13 | 1 | 4 | 7 | 1 | 1 | | |
| Tottori | 4 | 2 | | 1 | 1 | | | | |
| Toyama | 6 | 3 | 2 | | | 1 | | | |
| Wakayama | 6 | 3 | | 1 | | | | 2 | |
| Yamagata | 8 | 5 | 2 | 1 | | | | | |
| Yamaguchi | 9 | 6 | | 2 | 1 | | | | |
| Yamanashi | 5 | 2 | 1 | | 1 | | | | 1 |
| Total | 466 | 264 | 69 | 48 | 35 | 14 | 7 | 17 | 12 |

== Works cited ==
- Cole, Allan; Totten, George; Uyehara, Cecil (1966). Socialist Parties In Postwar Japan. Yale University Press.
- Scalapino, Robert (1967). The Japanese Communist Movement, 1920-1966. University of California Press.
