= Shigeru Yoshida =

Prime Minister of Japan (1946–1947; 1948–1954)

Junior First Rank Shigeru Yoshida
- 吉田 茂
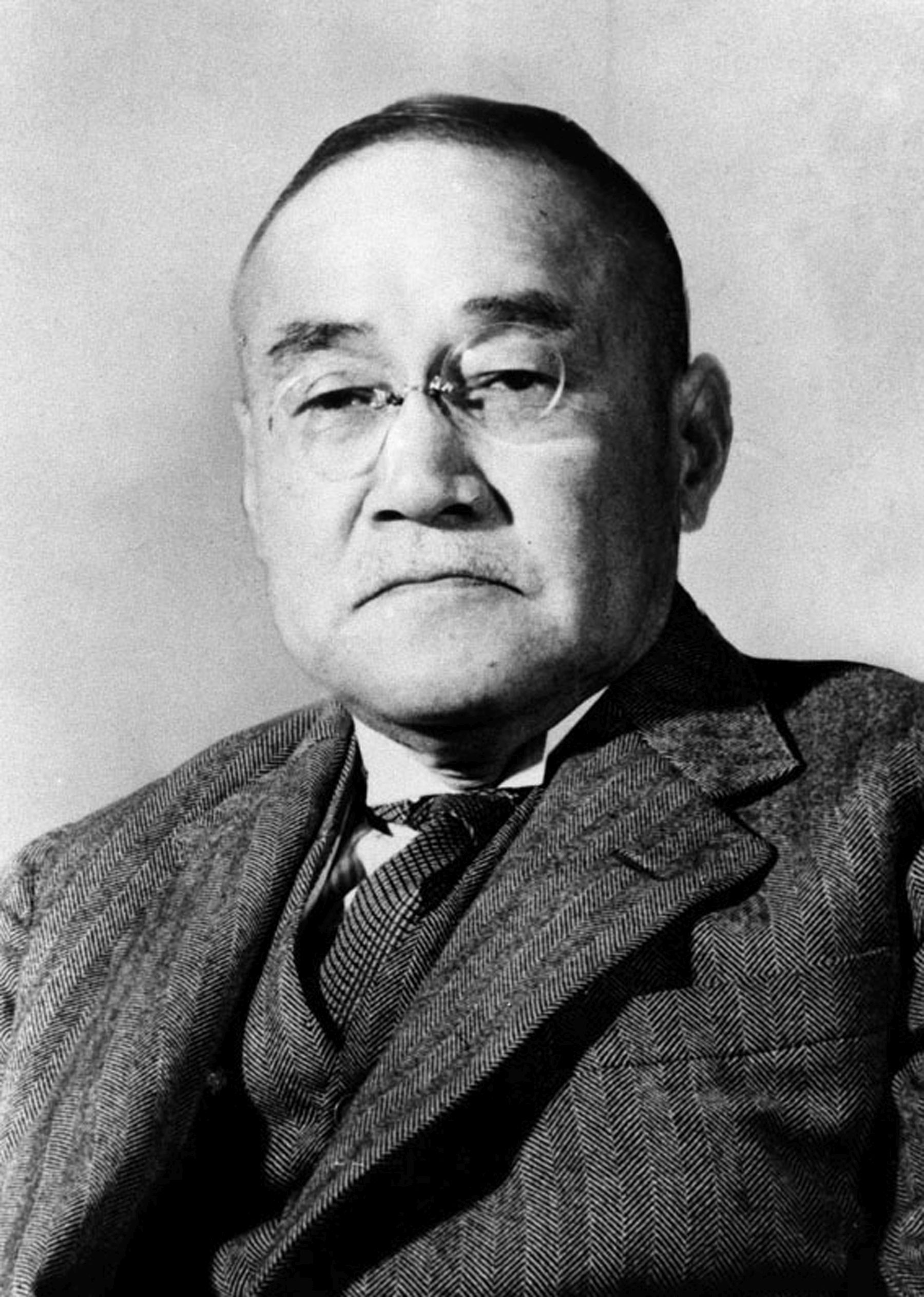
- Yoshida in 1947

Prime Minister of Japan
- In office 15 October 1948 – 10 December 1954
- Monarch: Hirohito
- Governor: Douglas MacArthur; Matthew Ridgway
- Deputy: Jōji Hayashi; Taketora Ogata
- Preceded by: Hitoshi Ashida
- Succeeded by: Ichirō Hatoyama
- In office 22 May 1946 – 24 May 1947
- Monarch: Hirohito
- Governor: Douglas MacArthur
- Deputy: Kijūrō Shidehara
- Preceded by: Kijūrō Shidehara
- Succeeded by: Tetsu Katayama

Minister for Foreign Affairs
- In office 15 October 1948 – 30 April 1952
- Prime Minister: Himself
- Preceded by: Hitoshi Ashida
- Succeeded by: Katsuo Okazaki
- In office 15 September 1945 – 27 May 1947
- Prime Minister: Naruhiko Higashikuni; Kijūrō Shidehara; Himself
- Preceded by: Mamoru Shigemitsu
- Succeeded by: Hitoshi Ashida

Minister of Agriculture and Forestry
- In office 30 January 1947 – 15 February 1947
- Prime Minister: Himself
- Preceded by: Hiroo Wada
- Succeeded by: Kozaemon Kimura

Member of the House of Representatives; for Kōchi's at-large district
- In office 26 April 1947 – 23 October 1963
- Preceded by: Constituency established
- Succeeded by: Ryōhei Tamura

Member of the House of Peers
- In office 19 December 1945 – 2 May 1947 Nominated by the Emperor

Personal details
- Born: 22 September 1878 Kanda-Surugadai, Tokyo, Japan
- Died: 20 October 1967 (aged 89) Ōiso, Kanagawa, Japan
- Party: LDP (1957–1967)
- Other political affiliations: JLP (1945–1948); DLP (1948–1950); LP (1950–1955); Independent (1955–1957)
- Spouse(s): Yukiko Makino (m. 1909; died 1941) Kiyo Sakamoto (m. 1944)
- Children: 4, including Ken'ichi
- Relatives: Tarō Asō (grandson); Nobuko, Princess Tomohito of Mikasa (granddaughter)
- Education: University of Tokyo (LLB)

Shigeru Yoshida (吉田 茂, Yoshida Shigeru; Japanese pronunciation: [jo.ɕi.da (|) ɕi.ɡe.ɾɯ, -ŋe.ɾɯ], 22 September 1878 – 20 October 1967) was a Japanese diplomat and politician who served as prime minister of Japan from 1946 to 1947 and again from 1948 to 1954, serving through most of the country's occupation after World War II. Yoshida played a major role in determining the course of post-war Japan by forging a strong relationship with the United States and pursuing economic recovery.

Born in Tokyo to a former samurai family, Yoshida graduated from Tokyo Imperial University in 1906 and joined the Ministry of Foreign Affairs. He held various assignments abroad, including in China, where he advocated increased Japanese influence. From 1928 to 1930, Yoshida served as vice minister of foreign affairs, then served as ambassador to Italy until 1932. In 1936, he was considered for foreign minister in the cabinet of Kōki Hirota, but he was opposed by the Army, who strongly identified him with liberalism and friendship with Great Britain and the United States. Yoshida served as ambassador to Britain from 1936 to 1938. He largely avoided political participation during the Pacific War. During the U.S. occupation after the war's end, Yoshida served as foreign minister in the cabinets of Prince Higashikuni and Kijūrō Shidehara.

Yoshida became prime minister in 1946, after Ichirō Hatoyama was purged by authorities on the verge of taking office; Yoshida served as foreign minister in his own first three cabinets. He oversaw the adoption of the Constitution of Japan before losing office after the election of 1947. He returned to the premiership in 1948, and negotiated the Treaty of San Francisco, which ended the occupation and saw the restoration of sovereignty to Japan, and a security treaty with the U.S. Yoshida pursued a strategy of concentrating on economic reconstruction while relying on an alliance with the United States for defense, a strategy known as the Yoshida Doctrine. The last years of his premiership were marked by conflict with Hatoyama, who had by then been depurged. This culminated in Yoshida being ousted and replaced by Hatoyama in 1954.

Yoshida's legacy continued to play an important part in Japanese political life, particularly through his two protégés, Hayato Ikeda and Eisaku Satō, who served as prime ministers from 1960 to 1964 and 1964 to 1972 respectively. Yoshida died in 1967 and received a state funeral. His grandson, Tarō Asō, served as prime minister from 2008 to 2009.

== Early life and education ==
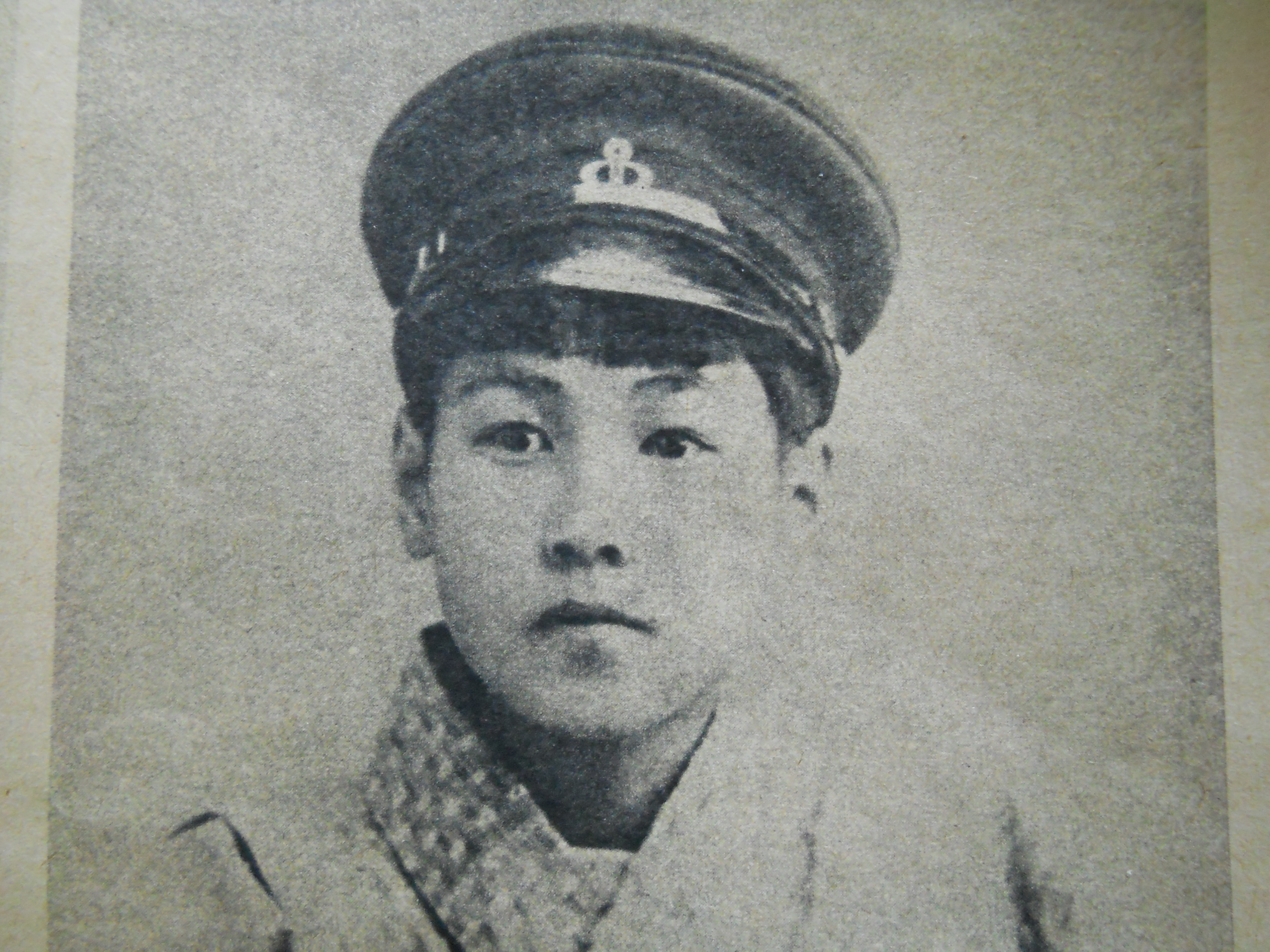
Yoshida as a child

Shigeru Yoshida was born on 22 September 1878, in Kanda-Surugadai, Tokyo, the fifth son of Tsuna Takeuchi, a former samurai of the Tosa domain. Tsuna Takeuchi was a close aide to Taisuke Itagaki in the 1880s and would serve in the first National Diet elected in 1890. The identity of Yoshida's biological mother is not known. It is likely she was a concubine of Takeuchi and possibly a geisha.

Shortly before Yoshida's birth, his biological father was imprisoned for anti-government conspiracy in connection to the Satsuma Rebellion, and his mother gave birth to him at the house of Kenzō Yoshida, a friend of his father. As young samurai, Tsuna and Kenzō had made names for themselves amidst the decades of unrest around the time of Meiji Restoration. Since Takeuchi had several sons and his friend Kenzō Yoshida had none, Yoshida was adopted by Kenzō Yoshida and his wife Kotoko in August 1881. Kenzō Yoshida was a former samurai who had traveled to England as a stowaway in his youth. He then established himself in Yokohama as a branch manager for Jardine Matheson, before becoming a successful businessman in his own right. Kotoko was the granddaughter of the Edo period Confucian scholar Issai Satō.

Yoshida spent his early childhood in Yokohama. After he graduated from elementary school there in 1889, he was enrolled at Koyo Juku, a prestigious rural boarding school. That same year, Kenzō Yoshida died, and Shigeru inherited a substantial fortune from him. Kotoko subsequently raised Shigeru on the family's estate in Ōiso when he was not at school.

Yoshida spent five years at Koyo Juku. In 1894 he went to Tokyo and spent a year studying at Nihon Gakuen, a school run by the famous educator Jugo Sugiura. He then went on to Higher Commercial School, but soon found he was unsuited for business and dropped out. He then briefly studied at Seisoku Academy and the Tokyo Physics School while preparing for higher school examinations, but he fell ill and had to spend a year at home in Ōiso. Returning to Tokyo in 1897, he entered the prestigious Peers' School, the headed by Prince Atsumaro Konoe. Yoshida advanced to the university department at Peers’ School, which Prince Konoe had established to train diplomats. The university department became defunct after Prince Konoe died in 1904, so Yoshida transferred to Tokyo Imperial University and graduated with a law degree in 1906. He passed the Foreign Service Entry Exam and entered Japan's diplomatic corps that same year, shortly after Japan's victory in the Russo-Japanese War.

== Diplomatic career ==
Yoshida's diplomatic career began with a posting in China, first at the Japanese mission in Tianjin in November 1906, then in Fengtian (now Shenyang) in 1907. In 1909, Yoshida married Yukiko Makino, the eldest daughter of Nobuaki Makino. That same year he was assigned to Italy, and in 1912, he was posted to Andong in Japanese-ruled Korea, where he served concurrently as secretary to the Governor General Masatake Terauchi. When Terauchi was appointed prime minister in 1916, Yoshida turned down an offer to serve as his personal secretary. He was instead assigned to the Japanese embassy in the United States, but this appointment was cancelled when the Ministry became aware Yoshida had opposed the Twenty-One Demands, which he thought undermined the Japanese policy in China by alienating the Western powers and provoking Chinese opposition. Yoshida was instead made chief of the documents section the following year and in 1918 he was appointed consul in Jinan, China.

In 1919, he was part of the Japanese delegation to the Paris Peace Conference, as secretary to his father-in-law Makino, one of the Japanese plenipotentiaries. When the conference concluded in 1920, he was assigned as first secretary to the Japanese embassy in the United Kingdom. In 1922, he returned to China and served as consul in Tianjin until 1925, then as Consul General in Fengtian until 1928.

In March 1928, Yoshida was first appointed minister to Sweden, Norway, and Denmark, but before assuming the post he was appointed vice minister for foreign affairs in July of the same year, after having recommended himself to the Prime Minister Giichi Tanaka. Tanaka served concurrently as minister for foreign affairs. During this time, Yoshida supported increasing Japanese influence in China, and advocated for the independence of Manchuria and Mongolia to weaken the Republic of China. He acquainted Ichiro Hatoyama, who was chief cabinet secretary under Tanaka. Yoshida remained in his post when Tanaka was replaced as prime minister by Osachi Hamaguchi and as foreign minister by Kijūrō Shidehara in July 1929, until he was appointed ambassador to Italy in December 1930. He returned to Japan in 1932 and, after having turned down the ambassadorship to the United States, for which he considered himself unsuitable, held a nebulous role as an ambassador-in-waiting. He undertook some foreign tours on behalf of the ministry and notably developed a warm relationship with the American ambassador Joseph Grew. Yoshida formally retired from the ministry in 1935.

In the aftermath of the February 26 incident of 1936, Prince Fumimaro Konoe contacted Yoshida to request that he'd help persuade Koki Hirota accept the premiership. Yoshida assisted Hirota in the cabinet formation and was himself considered for the post of foreign minister. However, he was included on a list of potential cabinet ministers unacceptable to the army presented by the incoming War Minister Hisaichi Terauchi. This prevented his appointment. Instead he became ambassador to the United Kingdom. After his ambassadorship to the United Kingdom ended in 1938, he retired, again, from the diplomatic service.

== During the Pacific War ==
Although considered a "hawk" on China, Yoshida was firmly against war with the United States and United Kingdom. Despite holding no official positions during World War II, he was active in trying to prevent war with the Allies, and then to try to bring about an early end of the war, allying himself with Prince Fumimaro Konoe.

Right before the Pacific War began, Yoshida joined Konoe in unsuccessfully attempting to deescalate the situation. During the war, Yoshida continued to associate with Konoe in trying to get the government to negotiate a peace with the Allies. In April 1945, he was arrested and briefly imprisoned over his association with Prince Konoe.

== Post-war period and premiership ==
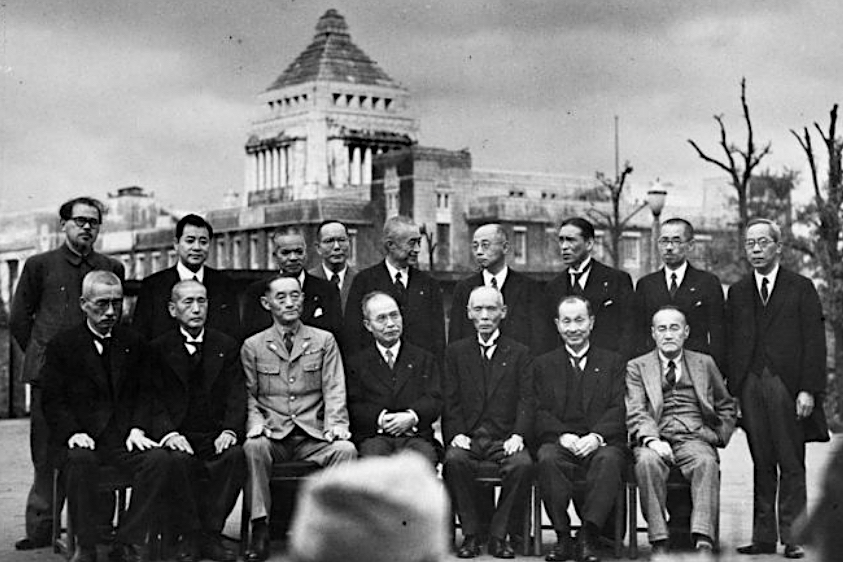
The Shidehara Cabinet, with Yoshida on the far right, front row

Following the Japanese surrender in August 1945, the Allied occupation of the country began. Yoshida was brought out of retirement to serve as foreign minister in the cabinet of Prince Higashikuni after the resignation of Mamoru Shigemitsu in September 1945. At that point, the main function of the foreign minister was to liaise with the occupation authority: the Supreme Commander for the Allied Powers. As such, Yoshida came into regular contact with General Douglas MacArthur. When Prince Higashikuni resigned Yoshida was approached by the Lord Keeper of the Privy Seal Koichi Kido to become prime minister, but he turned him down and suggested Kijuro Shidehara for the post, who was duly appointed. Yoshida remained foreign minister in the Shidehara Cabinet.

The first post-war election in April 1946 brought a plurality of the seats in the Diet to the Liberal Party led by Yoshida's old friend Ichirō Hatoyama. Hatoyama was expected to become prime minister, but was abruptly purged by the Supreme Commander for the Allied Powers on the eve of his appointment. Hatoyama approached Yoshida to take his place as prime minister and leader of the Liberal Party, despite Yoshida not even being a member of the party. Although reluctant, Yoshida eventually accepted, becoming prime minister of Japan on 22 May 1946. In the same month he joined the Liberal Party and was first made chairman of the general council before being formally elected party president four months later.

=== First premiership ===
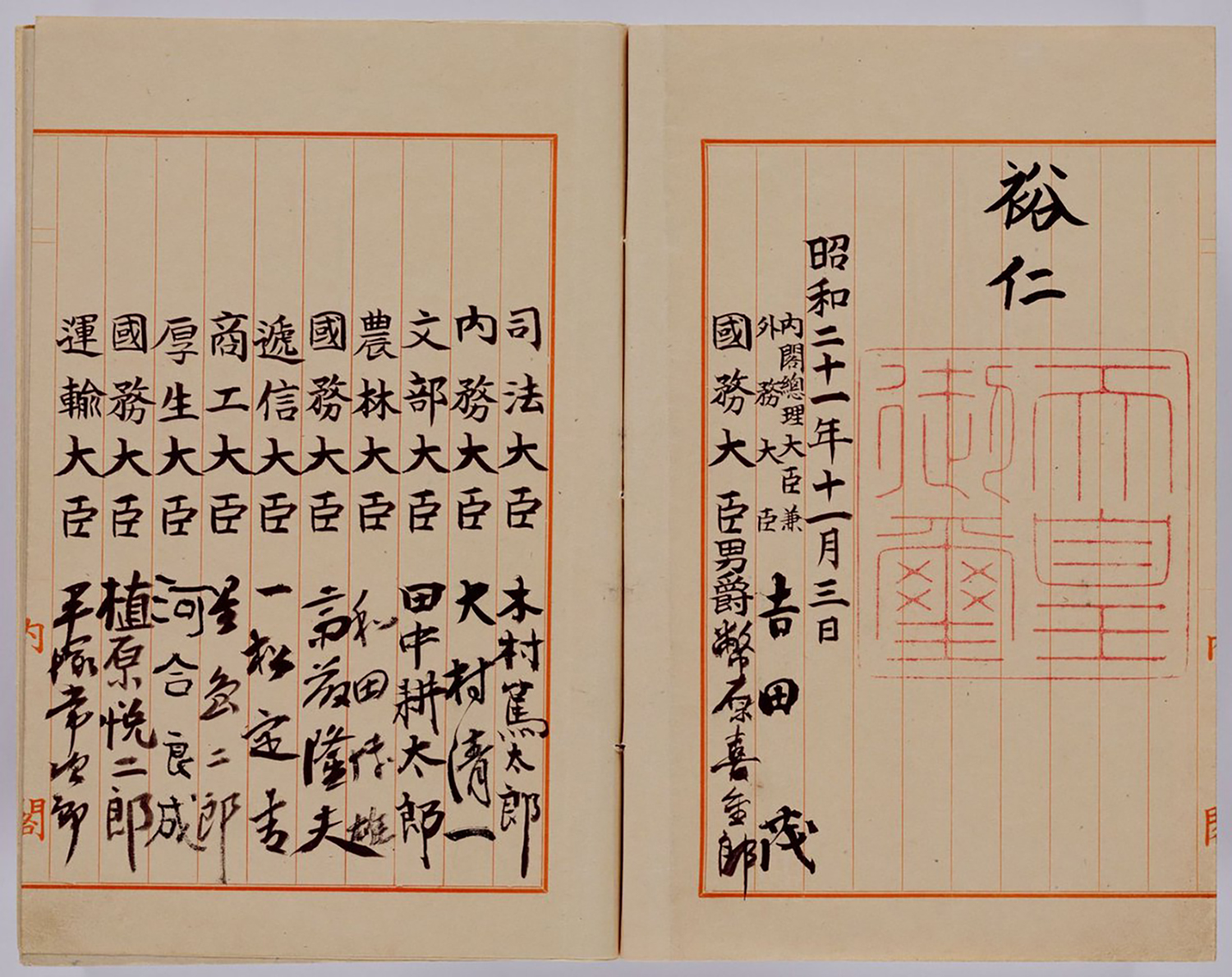
The Constitution of Japan signed by the Emperor, Prime Minister Yoshida and other ministers

Yoshida's first cabinet was based on a coalition between the Liberal Party and the Japan Progressive Party led by former prime minister Shidehara. The cabinet notably included Shidehara as minister without portfolio and Tanzan Ishibashi as finance minister. Yoshida remained as foreign minister concurrently. The cabinet implemented several reforms based on occupation directives, the scope of which Yoshida personally resisted. Yoshida oversaw the adoption of the post-war Constitution of Japan, which was promulgated on 3 November 1946 and came into effect on 3 May 1947. Yoshida, a warm supporter of the imperial institution, did not believe that the revised constitution fundamentally changed the kokutai.

In terms of economic policy, Yoshida and Finance Minister Ishibashi initiated a "priority production system" (傾斜生産方式, keisha seisan hoshiki) designed to increase production of steel and coal as they were essential for reconstruction. This system was based on the theories of Hiromi Arisawa, an economic expert who advised Yoshida. A goal was to move Japan to a free economy.

The cabinet had to face significant social unrest due to the impoverished situation and labour disputes at the time. These issues came to a head when the labour movement called for a general strike to take place on 1 February 1947. Yoshida believed that the strike would be an economic catastrophe, which could create the conditions for a communist revolution. The situation was resolved when General MacArthur prohibited the strike before it could take place on January 31. Afterwards, MacArthur communicated to Yoshida that a new election should be called.

=== Opposition ===
The election was held in April 1947 election. Yoshida himself stood for election for the first time, choosing for his constituency Kochi Prefecture, where his family originated. While Yoshida won his election, a plurality of the seats in the House of Representatives went to the Japan Socialist Party. Yoshida was approached by Tetsu Katayama and Suehiro Nishio, respectively chairman and secretary general of the Socialist Party, about including the Liberal Party in a grand coalition, but he declined because he considered the left wing of the Socialist Party too close to the communists. The Socialists instead formed a coalition with only the Democratic Party, which had been formed by merging the Progressive Party with defectors led by Hitoshi Ashida from the Liberal Party, and the National Cooperative Party. Yoshida was succeeded by Tetsu Katayama on 24 May 1947.

Yoshida and his party thus entered the opposition. Yoshida used this time to strengthen his party and consolidate his leadership. Shortly after the Katayama Cabinet was replaced by the Ashida Cabinet in March 1948, the Liberal Party formed into the Democratic Liberal Party by merging with a breakaway group led by Shidehara from the Democratic Party.

== Second premiership ==
After the fall of the Ashida Cabinet, Yoshida returned to the post of prime minister on 15 October 1948. On 23 December 1948, he was ousted by a vote of no confidence (227:130) He had to call an election which was held on 23 January 1949; his party won in a landslide.

In order to fill the places left by purged politicians, Yoshida had recruited a large number of former bureaucrats to serve as candidates for the party, including Hayato Ikeda, Eisaku Sato and Katsuo Okazaki. Many of these were elected for the first time in the 1949 election. This group would be the core of Yoshida’s own informal faction, known as the ”Yoshida School."

=== Dodge Line ===
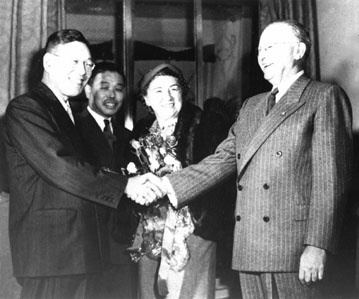
Joseph Dodge meets Finance Minister Hayato Ikeda in 1949.

In February after the election, Joseph Dodge arrived in Japan as financial adviser to SCAP with a mission to stabilize the Japanese economy, which was suffering from rampant inflation and other problems. The Dodge Line, as the plan advocated by Dodge would be called, prescribed strict austerity measures that significantly curtailed public spending and government subsidies.

Yoshida appointed Hayato Ikeda finance minister later the same month. Although Yoshida and Ikeda had apprehensions about the Dodge Line, they had no choice but to implement occupation policy. The plan was successful in ending hyperinflation, but it also caused severe short-term hardship. The decreased money supply led to a wave of bankruptcies and increased unemployment. Furthermore, spending cuts necessitated mass layoffs in the public sector.

This situation continued until the outbreak of the Korean War in June 1950. The war led to an economic boom stimulated by demand for goods and services from Japan by the American forces in Korea. Yoshida described this as a ”gift from the gods.”

=== Treaty of San Francisco ===
Yoshida signs the Treaty of San Francisco

In April 1950 Yoshida sent Finance Minister Ikeda, together with Ikeda’s secretary Kiichi Miyazawa and Yoshida’s confidant Jiro Shirasu, to Washington. On the pretext of an economic mission, Ikeda conveyed the message that the Japanese government would accept a continued U. S. military presence after the occupation in order to ensure Japan’s security and make an early peace treaty possible. President Truman assigned the responsibility of negotiating a peace treaty to John Foster Dulles. Dulles met with Yoshida in Tokyo for the first time in June 1950, only days before the outbreak of the Korean War. They subsequently met several times to negotiate the treaty.

In September 1951, Yoshida signed the Treaty of San Francisco, a peace treaty with the Allies that would serve as a formal peace agreement and bring about the end of the occupation of Japan when the treaty took effect in April 1952. Yoshida also signed the Security Treaty, which inaugurated the post-war military alliance between Japan and the United States. During a stopover in Hawaii on the way back from San Francisco, he also paid a visit to Pearl Harbor.

=== Yoshida Doctrine ===
The Yoshida Doctrine was a strategy adopted by Japan under Yoshida starting in 1951. He concentrated upon reconstructing Japan's domestic economy while relying heavily on the security alliance with the United States. Firstly, Japan is firmly allied with the United States in the Cold War against communism. Secondly, Japan relies on American military strength and limits its own defense forces to a minimum. Thirdly, Japan emphasizes economic diplomacy in its world affairs. The Yoshida doctrine was accepted by the United States; the actual term was coined in 1977. The economic dimension was fostered by Hayato Ikeda who served as his finance minister and later was prime minister. The Yoshida Doctrine shaped Japanese foreign policy into the 21st century. Most historians argue the policy was wise and successful, but a minority criticize it as naïve and inappropriate.

=== Conflict with Hatoyama ===
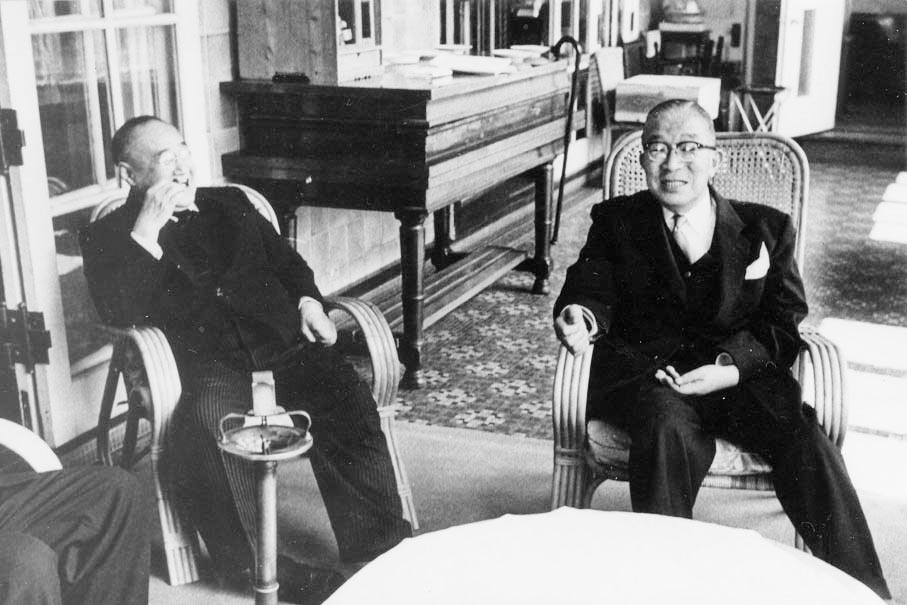
Yoshida meeting with Ichirō Hatoyama

Before the signing of the Treaty of San Francisco Ichirō Hatoyama had been released from the purge. Since Yoshida had originally become prime minister as a replacement for Hatoyama, many expected him to step down in Hatoyama's favour, but by this time Yoshida had become a well-established politician in his own right and had no intention to retire. This led to a conflict with Hatoyama.

According to CIA files that were declassified in 2005, there was a 1952 plot to assassinate Yoshida and replace him with Ichirō Hatoyama as prime minister. The plot was led by Takushiro Hattori, who served as an Imperial Japanese Army officer, and had the support of 500,000 Japanese people.

Dissatisfaction with his leadership led to the defection of many Diet members from his party to the new Democratic Party, causing his cabinet to resign on December 7, 1954, rather than face a no-confidence vote. He was replaced by Ichirō Hatoyama on December 10, 1954. Yoshida resigned as party president in favour of Taketora Ogata at the same time. He remained in the Diet until his retirement in 1963.

== Later years and legacy ==
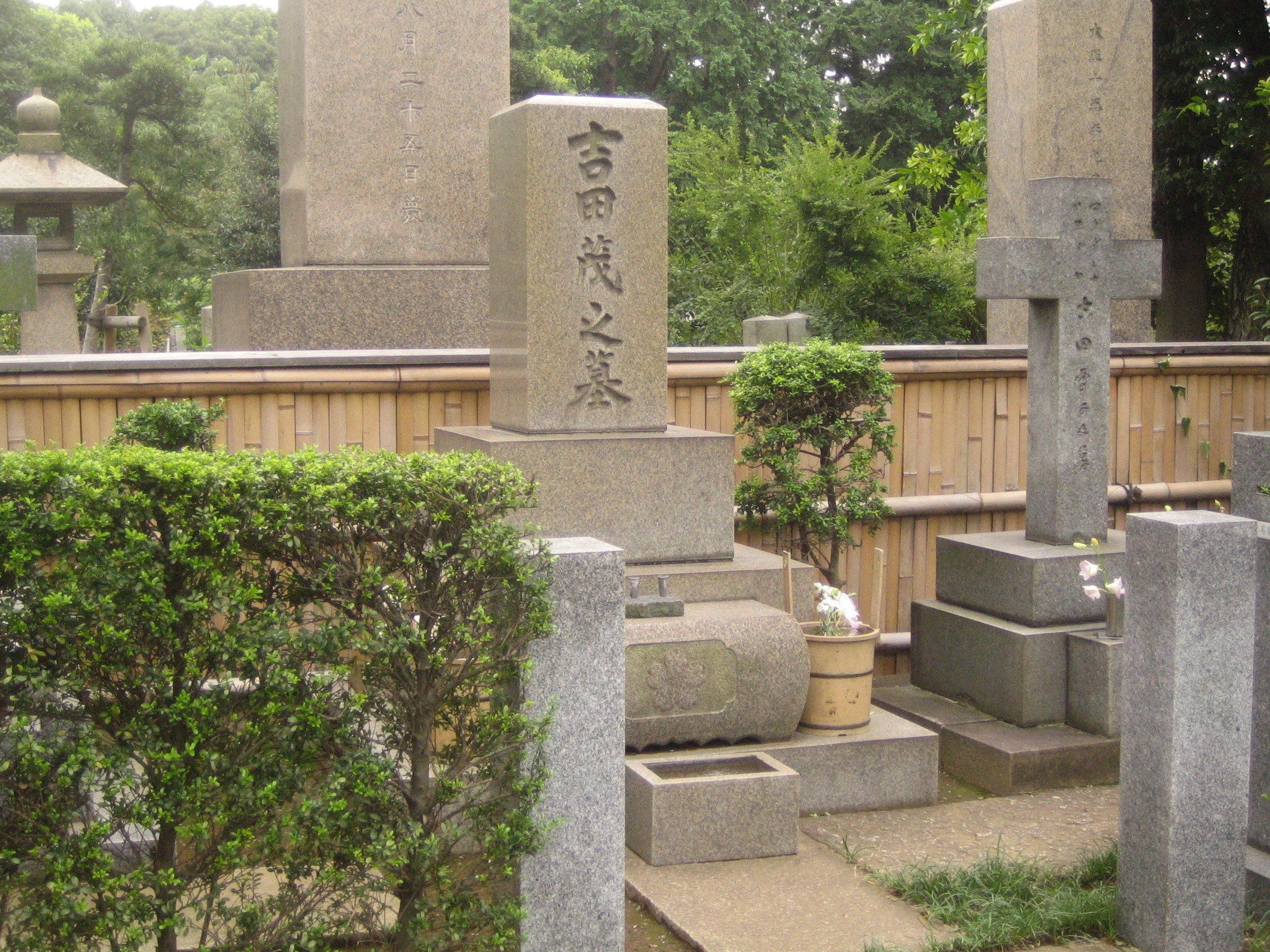
Yoshida's grave in the Aoyama Cemetery

After his resignation he spent most of his time at his villa in Oiso, though he remained a member of the House of Representatives until 1963. Yoshida served as president of the America-Japan Society from 1960 and as chancellor of Kogakkan University from 1962. He was also president of the Japanese Association of Zoos and Aquariums.

Shigeru Yoshida died on 20 October 1967 at his home in Oiso. He was baptized on his deathbed, having hidden his Catholicism throughout most of his life. His funeral was held in St. Mary's Cathedral, Tokyo and he was buried at Aoyama Cemetery.

His state funeral was held in Nippon Budokan on 31 October 1967 in the presence of the Crown Prince and Princess.

Under Yoshida's leadership, Japan began to rebuild its lost industrial infrastructure and placed a premium on unrestrained economic growth. Many of these concepts still impact Japan's political and economic policies. However, since the 1970s environmental movement, the bursting of Japan's economic bubble, and the end of the Cold War, Japan has been struggling to redefine its national goals. Yoshida has long been regarded as prioritising the economy over defense, but recent years have seen a reevaluation of this viewpoint.

In his 1982 book "Leaders", US President Richard Nixon praised Yoshida as one of the greatest world leaders during his lifetime for his role in Japan's post-WWII economic miracle.

== Personal life ==
In 1909, Yoshida married Makino Yukiko, the eldest daughter of Makino Nobuaki. They had four children: Sakurako, Kenichi, Kazuko, and Masao. Two of Yoshida's grandchildren are Tarō Asō, who served as the 92nd prime minister of Japan from 2008 to 2009, and Nobuko Asō, who later married Prince Tomohito of Mikasa, a first cousin of Emperor Akihito.

== Honours ==
- Grand Cordon of the Order of the Rising Sun (29 April 1940)
- Grand Cordon of the Order of the Chrysanthemum (29 April 1964)
- Collar of the Order of the Chrysanthemum (20 October 1967; posthumous)
- Junior First Rank (20 October 1967; posthumous)
- Golden Pheasant Award of the Scout Association of Japan (1967)

== Bibliography ==
- Dower, John W. (1988). Empire and Aftermath: Yoshida Shigeru and the Japanese Experience, 1878–1954 (2nd ed.). Harvard University Press. ISBN 0-674-25125-3.
- Edström, Bert. Yoshida Shigeru and the Foundation of Japan's Postwar Foreign Policy.
- Finn, Richard B. (1992). Winners in peace: MacArthur, Yoshida, and Postwar Japan. University of California Press. ISBN 978-0-520-33323-9.
- Takashi Hirose (広瀬隆); 『私物国家 日本の黒幕の系図』 Tokyo:Kobunsha (1997) Genealogy14
- Iriye, Akira. "Japan Returns to the World: Yoshida Shigeru and His Legacy." The Diplomats, 1939-1979 (Princeton University Press, 2019) pp. 321–336. online
- Nish, Ian (2007). Japanese Envoys in Britain, 1862-1964. Global Oriental. ISBN 978-9004213456.
- Okazaki, Hisahiko (2019). Yoshida Shigeru and His Time. Japan Publishing Industry Foundation for Culture. ISBN 9784866580708.
- Rodan, Garry, Hewison, Kevin and Robison, Richard. (1997). The Political Economy of South-East Asia: An Introduction. Melbourne: Oxford University Press. ISBN 978-0-195-53736-9; OCLC 464661946
- McGrew, Anthony and Brook, Christopher. (1998). Asia-Pacific in the New World Order. London: Routledge. ISBN 978-0-415-17272-1; ISBN 978-0-415-17271-4; OCLC 60184921
- Yoshida, Shigeru; Nara, Hiroshi (2007). Shigeru: Last Meiji Man. Lanham, Maryland: Harvard University Press. ISBN 978-0-742-53933-4.
- Metzler, Mark D. (2013). Capital as Will and Imagination: Schumpeter's Guide to the Postwar Japanese Miracle. Ithaca, New York: Cornell University Press. ISBN 978-0801451799. JSTOR 10.7591/j.ctt1xx5rj.
- Park, Gene (2011). Spending Without Taxation : FILP and the Politics of Public Finance in Japan. Redwood City: Stanford University Press. ISBN 978-0804773300.
- Nixon, Richard (25 October 1982). Leaders. Grand Central Publishing. ISBN 978-0-446-51249-7.
- Eldridge, Robert D.; Kusunoki, Ayako (1999). "To Base or Not to Base? Yoshida Shigeru, the 1950 Ikeda Mission, and Post-Treaty Japanese Security Conceptions". Kobe University Law Review. 33 (1): 97–126.
- Hosoya, Chihiro (2013). "The Dulles-Yoshida Talks 1950-1951". In Nish, Ian (ed.). The British Commonwealth and the Allied Occupation of Japan, 1945-1952. Leiden, Boston: Global Oriental.
- Watanabe, Akio, ed. (2016). The Prime Ministers of Postwar Japan, 1945-1995. Lanham, MD: Lexington Books. ISBN 978-1-4985-1001-1.

Diplomatic posts
Preceded by Katsuji Debuchi	Vice Minister for Foreign Affairs; 1928–1930	Succeeded by Matsuzo Nagai
Preceded by Michikazu Matsuda	Ambassador to Italy; 1931–1932	Succeeded by Hajime Matsushima
Preceded by Tsuneo Matsudaira	Ambassador to the United Kingdom; 1936–1938	Succeeded by Mamoru Shigemitsu
Political offices
Preceded by Mamoru Shigemitsu	Minister of Foreign Affairs; 1945–1947	Succeeded by Hitoshi Ashida
Preceded by Kijūrō Shidehara	Prime Minister of Japan; 1946–1947	Succeeded by Tetsu Katayama
Preceded by Hitoshi Ashida	Minister for Foreign Affairs; 1948–1952	Succeeded by Katsuo Okazaki
Preceded by Hitoshi Ashida	Prime Minister of Japan; 1948–1954	Succeeded by Ichirō Hatoyama
Party political offices
Preceded by Bukichi Miki	Chairman of the General Council, Liberal Party; 1946	Succeeded by Nirō Hoshijima
Preceded by Ichiro Hatoyama	President of the Liberal Party; 1946–1948	Merged into Democratic Liberal Party
New title Party founded	President of the Democratic Liberal Party; 1948–1950	Merged into Liberal Party
New title Party founded	President of the Liberal Party; 1950–1954	Succeeded by Taketora Ogata
