= Cabinet Office (Japan) =

Agency in the Cabinet of Japan

- 内閣府; Naikaku-fu

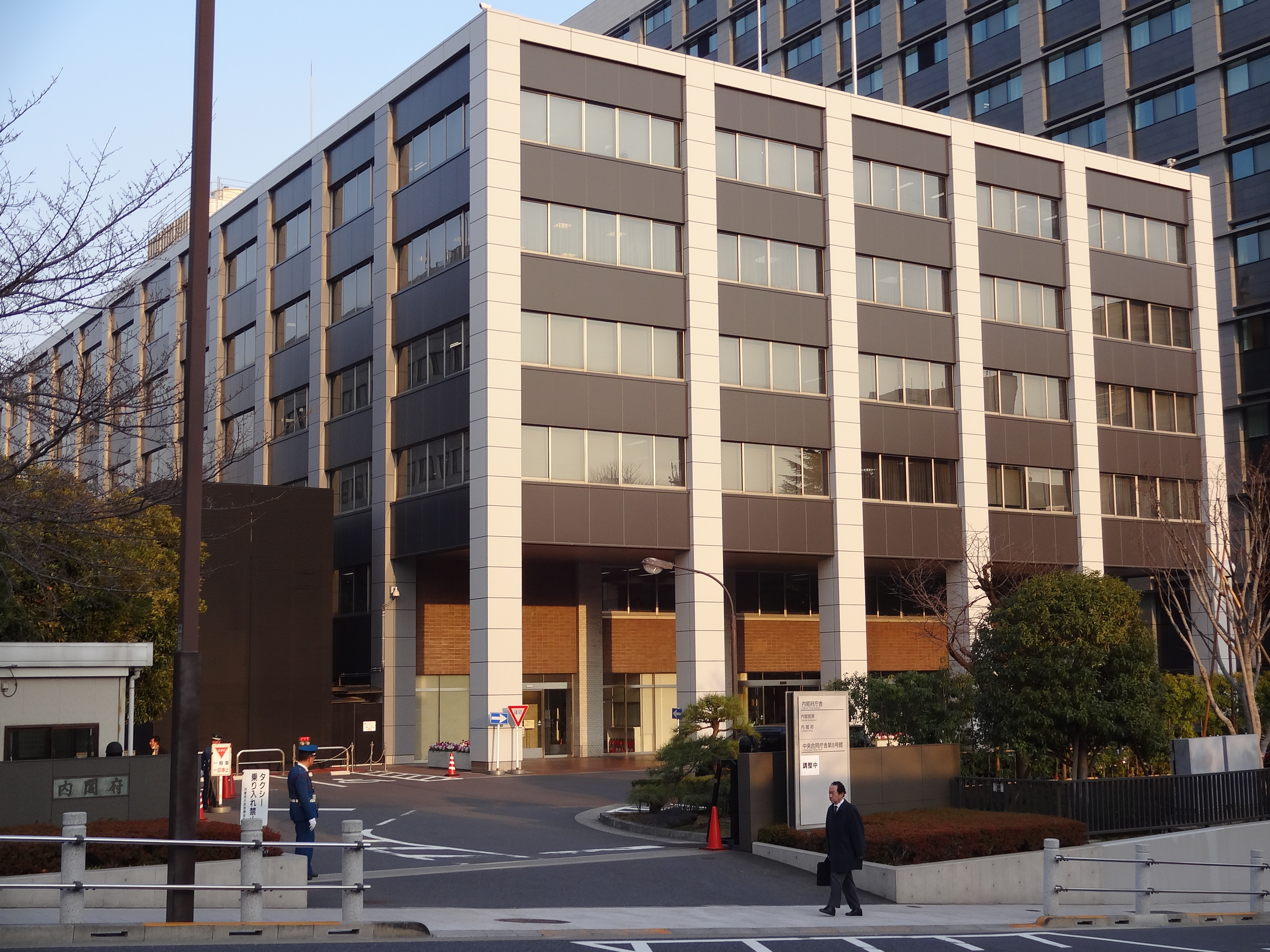
- Cabinet Office Building

Agency overview
- Formed: 6 January 2001
- Preceding agencies: Prime Minister's Office; Economic Planning Agency; Okinawa Regional Development Bureau; National Land Agency Disaster Prevention Bureau
- Jurisdiction: Japan
- Headquarters: 1-6-1 Nagata-cho, Chiyoda-ku, Tokyo 100-8914, Japan; 35.673°N 139.745°E
- Annual budget: JP¥3,042,234,260
- Agency executives: Sanae Takaichi, Prime Minister; Minoru Kihara, Minister of State / Chief Cabinet Secretary
- Website: cao.go.jp

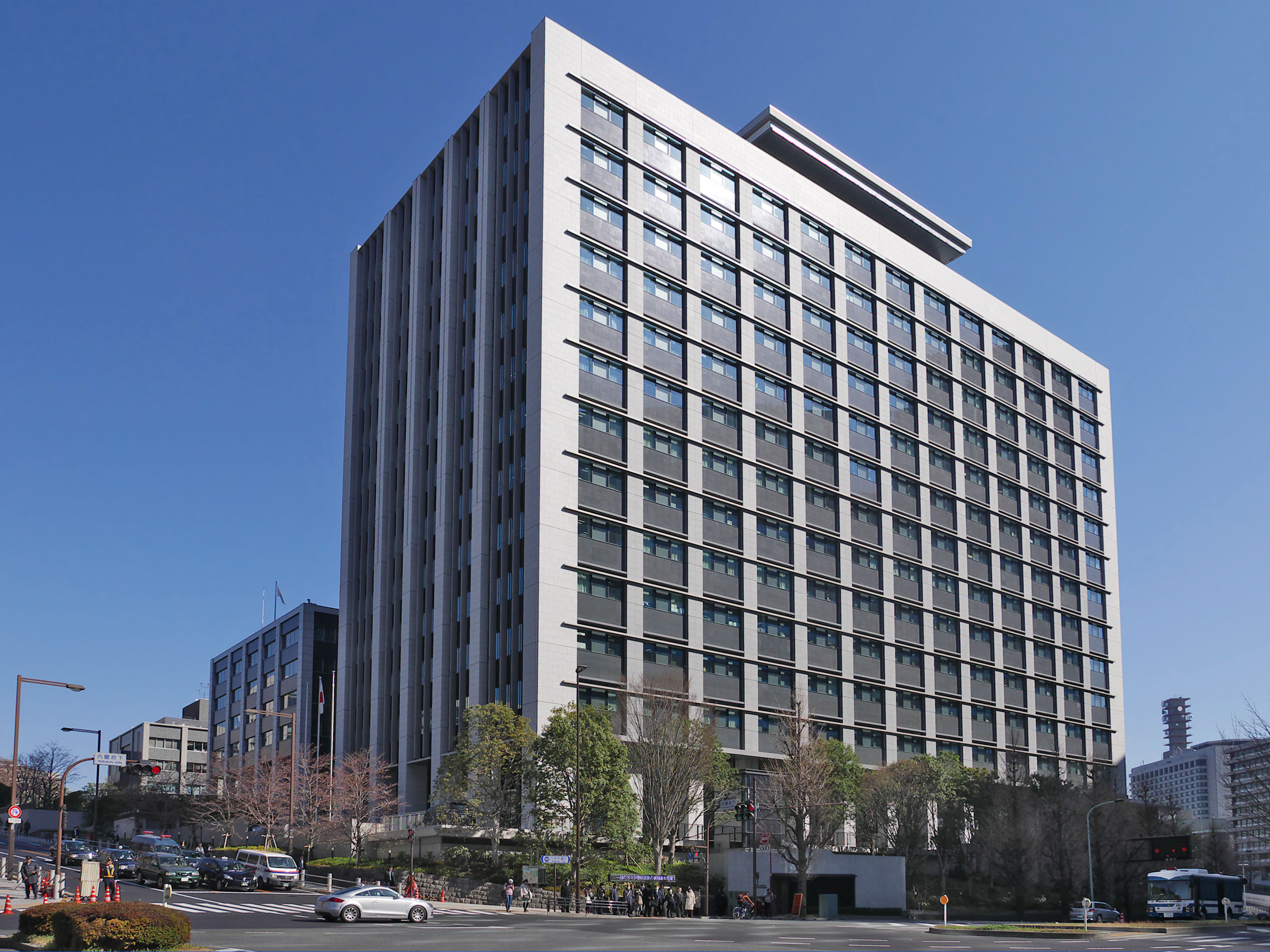
Central Government Building No. 8 (Cabinet Office Building on the left side) where the Cabinet Office Ministers' Secretariat General Affairs Division is located.

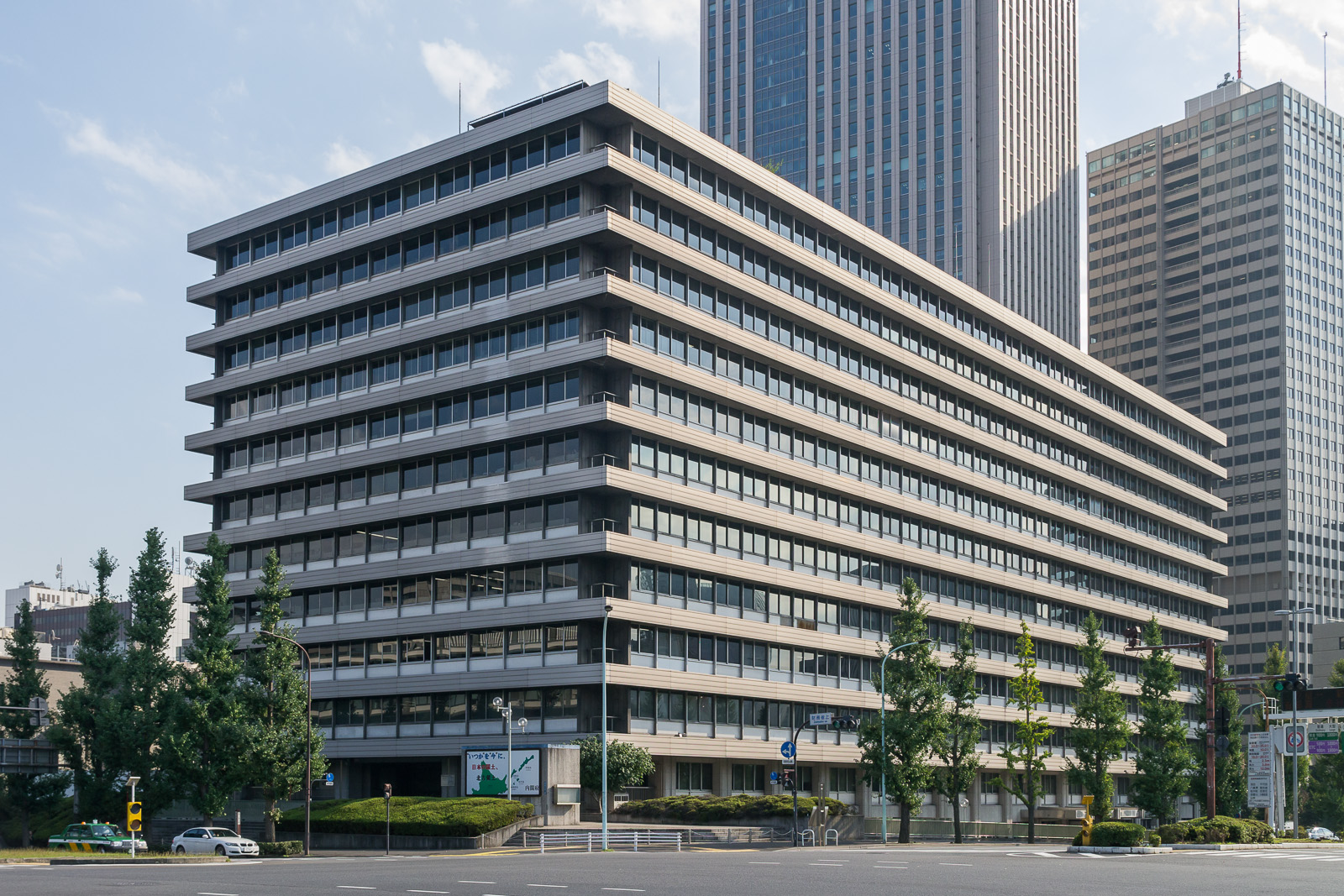
Central Government Building No. 4 in which the Cabinet Office International Peace Cooperation Headquarters is located.

The Cabinet Office (内閣府, Naikaku-fu) (CAO) is an agency of the Cabinet of Japan. It is responsible for handling the day-to-day affairs of the Cabinet.

The Cabinet Office is formally headed by the Prime Minister.

== Ministers ==
Position	Minister
Prime Minister	Sanae Takaichi
Minister of State / Chief Cabinet Secretary	Minoru Kihara
Ministers of State for Special Missions	Satsuki Katayama; Ryosei Akazawa; Hirotaka Ishihara; Hisashi Matsumoto; Jiro Akama; Hitoshi Kikawada; Kimi Onoda
State Ministers	Soichiro Imaeda; Takakazu Seto; Kazuchika Iwata; Hayato Suzuki; Jun Tsushima; Toshiro Ino; Kenji Yamada; Yasuyuki Sakai; Kiyoto Tsuji; Masahisa Miyazaki
Parliamentary Vice-Ministers	Hideto Kawasaki; Yozo Kaneko; Shinji Wakayama; Naoki Furukawa; Toshiyuki Ochi; Takuo Komori; Eishun Ueda; Rio Tomonoh; Shinji Yoshida
Administrative Vice-Minister	Hiroyuki Inoue

== History ==
The Cabinet Office was established on 6 January 2001, following the reorganization of the central government. It was created to assist in the planning and overall coordination of government policies led by the Cabinet (including the Cabinet Secretariat). The Cabinet Office is different from other ministries and agencies, as it is installed in the Cabinet and includes several Ministers of State called Minister of State for Special Missions.

Early on, some argued it was inappropriate to use the name Cabinet Office because "it is an organization that divides and manages administrative affairs and not the cabinet itself".

The National Administrative Organization Law does not apply, instead, all necessary matters are stipulated in the Cabinet Office Establishment Law. Many important policy issues require cross-ministerial responses and since the establishment of the Cabinet Office they have delt with many different matters. The Cabinet Office's presence has increased, such as its jurisdiction over certified children's educational institutions. The number of Ministers of State for Special Missions has increased from 6 at the beginning of the Cabinet Office, to 10 as of September 2020.

In the Third Abe Cabinet, as a review of the work, the "Act for Partial Revision of the National Administrative Organization Act, etc. for Strengthening Functions Related to Comprehensive Coordination, etc. of the Important Policy of the Cabinet" was enacted, and future transfer of work to each ministry was established.

== Jurisdiction ==
The Cabinet Office's function is to help the Cabinet work on important policies and streamline critical issues Japan will face in the future.

Its responsibilities extend to:

- The Imperial Family, honorary and official systems
- Promotion of the formation of a gender-equal society
- Civil Activities
- Promotion and development of Okinawa and the northern territories
- Protection of the public from disasters
- Promotion of fair and free competition between businesses
- Ensuring national security
- Identifying specific individuals in administrative procedures
- Ensuring the proper handling of numbers, etc.
- Ensuring appropriate functions of finance
- Promoting measures for the realization of a society where consumers can live in a safe and secure consumer life

As such, the Cabinet Office is responsible for several agencies and internal ministries and administrations through which these responsibilities are spread.

== Organization ==
The CO is structured as of 2014:

=== Bureaus ===
- Ministers' Secretariat (内閣府大臣官房)
  - General Affairs Division
  - Personnel Division
  - Accounts Division
  - Policy Coordination Division
  - Policy Evaluation and Public Relations Division
  - Records and Archives Management Division
  - Public Relations Office
- Director General for Economic and Fiscal Management
- Director General for Economic, Fiscal and Social Structure
- Director General for Economic Research
- Director General for Science and Technology Policy
- Director General for Disaster Management
- Director General for Nuclear Disaster Management
- Director General for Okinawa affairs
- Director General for Policies on Cohesive Society
- Decoration Bureau
  - General Affairs Division
- Gender Equality Bureau
  - General Affairs Division
  - Research Division
  - Gender Equality Promotion Division
- Okinawa Development and Promotion Bureau
  - General Affairs Division

=== Councils ===
- Council on Economic and Fiscal Policy
- Council for Science and Technology Policy
- Council on National Strategic Special Zones
- Central Disaster Managiment Council
- Council for Gender Equality

=== Committees ===
- Committee on National Space Policy
- Committee for the Promotion of Private Finance Initiative
- Japan Agency for Medical Research and Development
- Food Safety Commission
- Council for Children and Child-rearing
- Council on the Use of Real Estate
- Public Recordsand Archives Management Commission
- CentralCouncil on Promotion of Measures for Persons with Disabilities
- Atomic Energy Commission
- LocalGovernment System Research Council
- Election System Council
- Council on the House of Representatives Electoral District
- Council for Relocation of the Diet and Other Organizations
- Statistics Commission
- Information Disclosure and Personal Information Protection Review Board
- Public Interest Corporation Commission
- Reemployment Surveillance Commission
- Retirement Allowance Examination Committee
- Consumer Commission
- Okinawa Development Council
- Council for RegulatoryReform
- Tax Commission

=== Institutions ===
- Economic and Social Research Institute
- State Guest House

=== Special institutions ===
- Office for Promotion of Regional Revitalization
- Secretariat of Intellectual Property Strategy Promotion
- National Space Policy Secretariat
- Northern Territories Affairs Administration
- Administration for Children and Child Care
- National Ocean Policy Secretariat
- Financial Crisis Response Council
- Private Fund Utilization Business Promotion Council
- Child and Youth Development Support Promotion Headquarters
- Declining Birthrate Society Countermeasures Council
- Aging Society Measures Council
- Central Traffic Safety Measures Council
- Crime Victims Promotion Council
- Poverty Countermeasures for Children Council
- Consumer Policy Council
- International Peace Cooperation Headquarters
- Science Council of Japan
- Public-Private Human Resources Exchange Centre
- Nuclear Power Council

=== Local branch offices ===
- Okinawa General Secretariat (沖縄総合事務局)

=== External offices ===
- National Public Safety Commission
  - National Police Agency
- Consumer Affairs Agency
- Financial Services Agency
- Fair Trade Commission
- Food Safety Commission
- Personal Information Protection Commission
- Imperial Household Agency
