= Premiership of Sanae Takaichi =

Government of Japan, 2025–

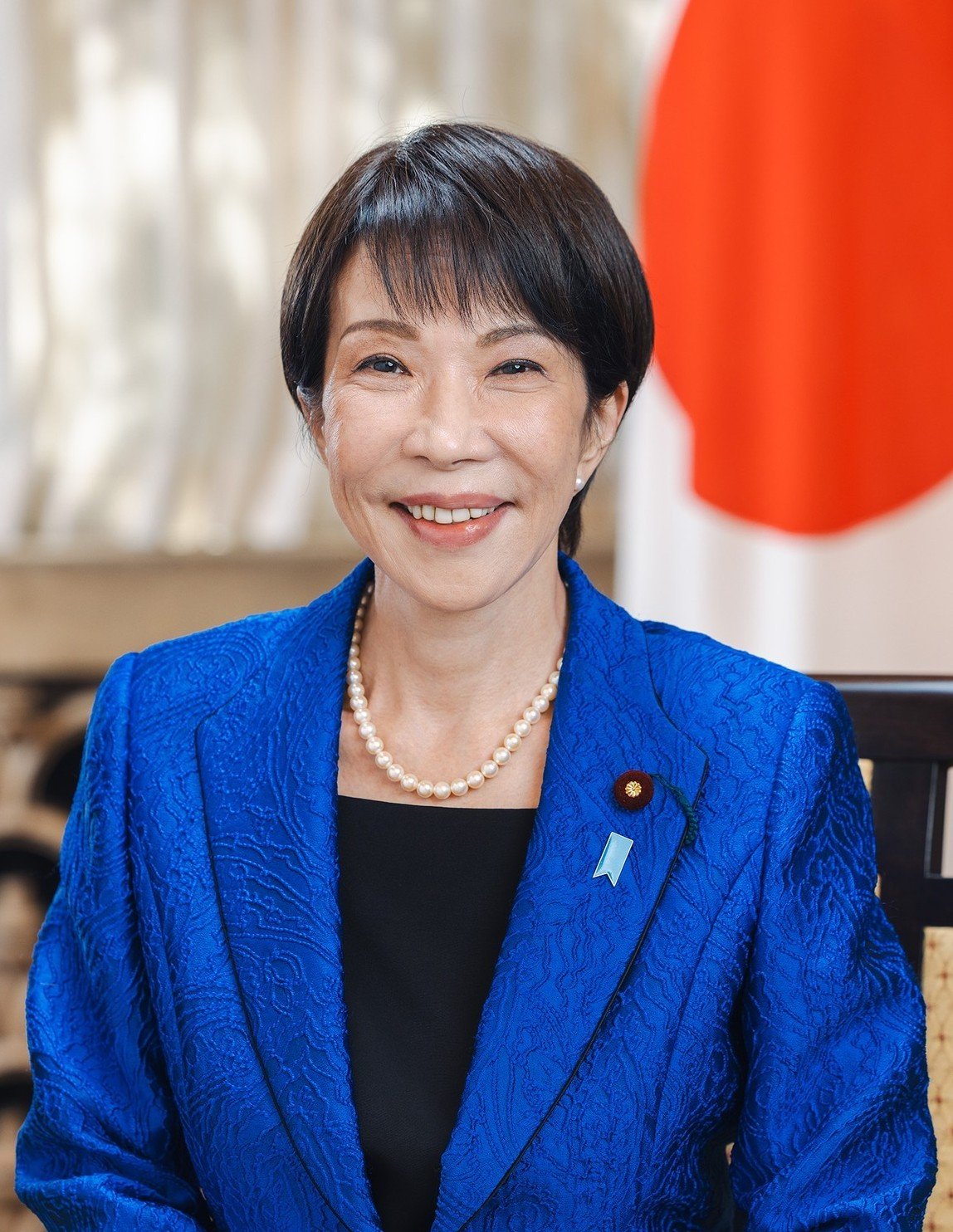
- Official portrait, 2025
- Premiership of Sanae Takaichi; 21 October 2025 – present
- Monarch: Naruhito
- Cabinet: First Takaichi cabinet; Second Takaichi cabinet
- Party: Liberal Democratic
- Election: 2026
- Seat: Naikaku Sōri Daijin Kantei
- Constituency: Nara 2nd
- Emblem of the Government of Japan

Sanae Takaichi's tenure as prime minister of Japan began on 21 October 2025 when she was officially appointed prime minister by Emperor Naruhito in a ceremony at the Tokyo Imperial Palace, succeeding Shigeru Ishiba. She is the first woman to hold the office in Japanese history.

Takaichi stood in the 2025 Liberal Democratic Party presidential election to succeed Ishiba, who resigned after the Liberal Democratic Party (LDP)'s losses in the 2024 and 2025 elections. Takaichi won both rounds, becoming the first female LDP president. Her election led to Komeito to break its long-time coalition agreement with the LDP. Takaichi then formed a coalition with the Japan Innovation Party (JIP).

Shortly after taking office, Takaichi faced a diplomatic crisis with China after a statement she made regarding Japan's involvement regarding a potential Chinese attack on Taiwan and subsequent threatening remarks by a Chinese diplomat. Takaichi's administration has consistently polled high in approval ratings. In 2026, she called a snap general election, which resulted in a historic landslide victory for the LDP, securing a two-thirds supermajority and the largest number of seats ever won in postwar Japanese electoral history.

== LDP presidential bid ==
Following Prime Minister Shigeru Ishiba's announcement of his resignation in September 2025, Takaichi announced her candidacy for LDP president in the resulting leadership election on 18 September 2025. In early polling, Takaichi and agricultural minister Shinjirō Koizumi were identified as the frontrunners. Ultimately, Takaichi won both rounds, defeating Koizumi with 185 votes to 156 votes in the runoff and becoming the first woman to hold the post of LDP president.

Upon her election as party president, it was already speculated that a Takaichi government would accommodate an interest rate increase by the Bank of Japan early in her possible tenure as prime minister. After her election, the Nikkei 225 share index surged past the 47,000 level for the first time, and the value of the yen fell. The Nikkei rose over 4% to hit a record high and the index closed 4.75% higher at the end of the trading day, while the yen fell 1.8% against the dollar.

On 10 October, Komeito party leader Tetsuo Saito announced that his party would break with the LDP and leave the governing coalition, citing disagreements with Takaichi's leadership and the LDP's handling of the slush fund scandal. This development signified the collapse of the 26-year-old LDP–Komeito coalition. As a result, the parliamentary election to choose Japan's next prime minister was pushed back from 15 to 20 October. On 15 October, Takaichi asked Hirofumi Yoshimura, the leader of the Japan Innovation Party, to enter into a coalition with the LDP.

On 17 October, the National Diet voted to set 21 October as the session confirmation date. On 19 October, the LDP and the Japan Innovation Party agreed to form a coalition. The leaders of both parties signed a coalition agreement the following day, clearing Takaichi's path to the premiership. At the 21 October meeting of the National Diet, both houses nominated Takaichi to succeed Shigeru Ishiba as prime minister. Takaichi avoided a runoff in the lower house, garnering 237 votes against Constitutional Democratic Party leader Yoshihiko Noda's 149. She was officially appointed prime minister by Emperor Naruhito in a ceremony at the Tokyo Imperial Palace later that day. She became both the first woman and the first person from Nara Prefecture to hold the post.

== Premiership ==
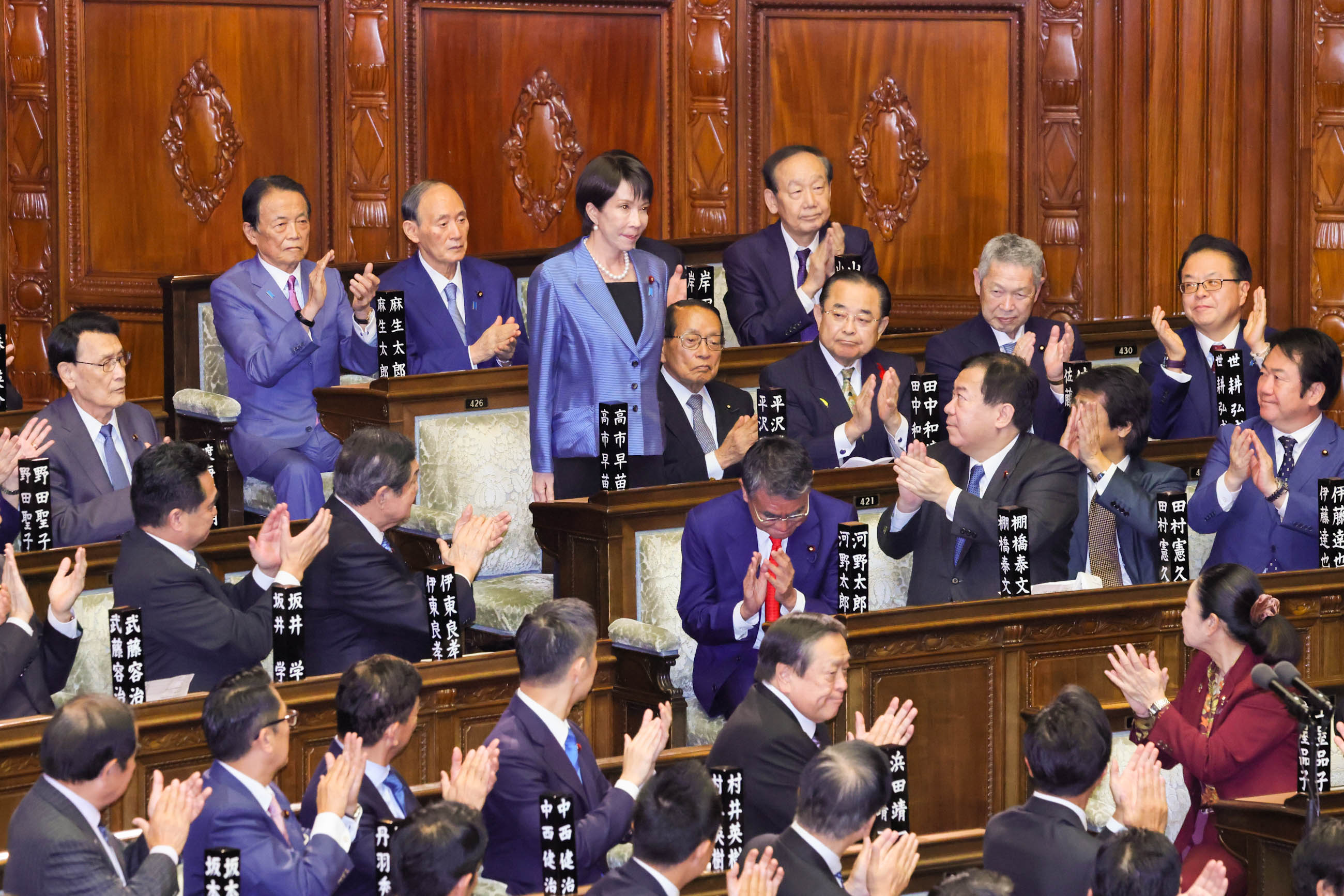
Takaichi is elected Prime Minister by the Diet, 21 October 2025

After becoming prime minister on 21 October, Takaichi formed her cabinet. While she had said that she wanted her cabinet to include as many women as those in the Nordic countries, only two women actually joined the cabinet: Satsuki Katayama as Japan's first female finance minister, and Kimi Onoda as economic security minister. In her inaugural press conference, Takaichi said that she "prioritised equality of opportunity" above all else, and had selected ministers based on their qualifications, not gender.

The cabinet was viewed as favoring party unity, with Takaichi's rivals receiving key positions: Toshimitsu Motegi as foreign minister, Yoshimasa Hayashi as internal affairs minister and Shinjiro Koizumi as defense minister. Ishiba's confidant Ryosei Akazawa was promoted to minister of economy, trade and industry, showing a degree of continuity. Chief Cabinet Secretary Minoru Kihara, however, is ideologically aligned with Takaichi, a break from recent prime ministers.

During the first press conference of her premiership on 21 October 2025, Takaichi outlined her priorities such as tackling rising inflation and said that she would work to implement suspension of the provisional gasoline tax rate. Takaichi also announced her other plans such as the proposal for creating a back-up capital region, overhauling Japan's social security system, revising the constitution, and creating a majority government to bring stability, while listening to opposition parties regarding national policies and raising the national tax-free income threshold, which were also in line with her agreement with the Japan Innovation Party. Takaichi stated that crisis management was part of the core agenda of her premiership and laid out her plans to increase the collaboration of the public and private sectors in investing in economic, energy, and food security.

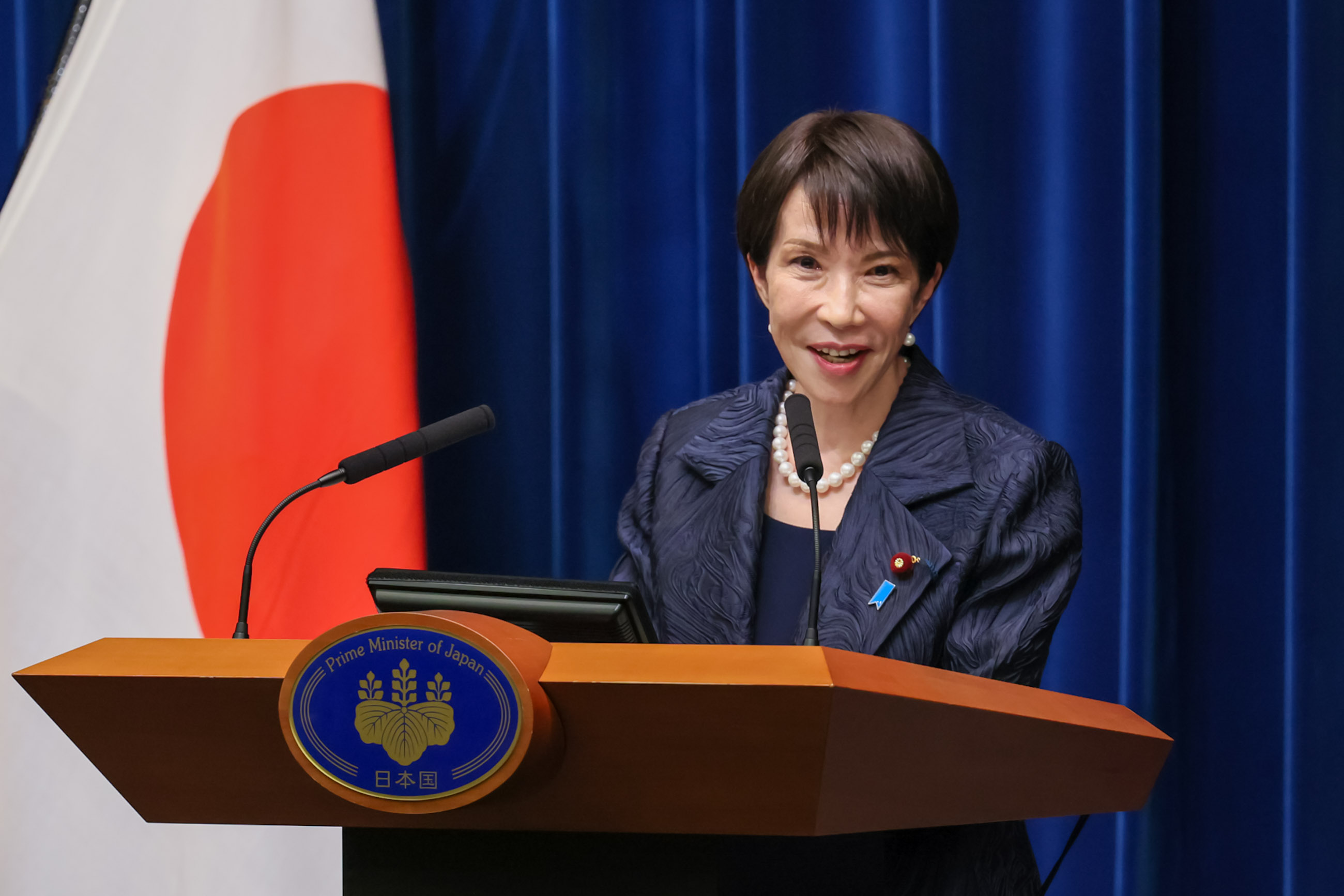
Prime Minister Takaichi speaks in front of reporters during her first press conference as prime minister at the Prime Minister's Residence on 21 October 2025.

On 24 October 2025, during her first policy speech at the National Diet, Takaichi repeated her priorities in tackling inflation, fiscal spending, the creation of an economic growth panel, and her previous proposal on scrapping the provisional tax on gasoline. Takaichi stated that she would bring forward Japan's plans to raise annual military spending to 2% of GDP, announcing a new target of March 2026, rather than the previous target of 2027, in an aim to modernize and upgrade the capabilities of the Japan Self-Defense Forces, while laying out a proposal to revise Japan's three national security documents due to the evolving threats in the region, such as the Russian invasion of Ukraine, the Gaza war, the Red Sea crisis, and increasing military actions by North Korea, Russia, and China. Takaichi mentioned the need to continue Japan's alliance with the United States, while enhancing Japan's diplomacy to the international community.

=== 2026 general election and Second cabinet ===
On 23 January 2026, Takaichi dissolved the House of Representatives, allowing a general election to be held on 8 February. The election resulted in a historic landslide victory for the LDP, with the party winning an outright two-thirds supermajority and regaining its majority status in the chamber. The LDP's total of at least 316 seats is the most ever won by a party in the Diet's Lower House in Japanese electoral history. Analysts credited the party's victory to Takaichi's high personal popularity at the time of the election. She was especially popular among young voters, with one poll finding that 84 percent of respondents in their 20s and 78 percent of those in their 30s backed the prime minister and her cabinet (compared with 67 percent of voters overall).

=== Domestic policy ===
Takaichi renewed her two predecessors' efforts to make Japan a leading asset management center and for their plan of setting up an agency for disaster prevention. Takaichi emphasized the need for immigrant labor, saying that foreign workers were still needed to supplement Japan's declining population. She highlighted the need to balance labor market needs and the increasing immigrant population, noting that Japan's acceptance of migrants was premised on their compliance with Japan's rules and laws, and vowed to strengthen regulations to enforce compliance.

=== Economic policy ===
According to local reports, Takaichi planned a ¥13.9 trillion ($92.19 billion) economic stimulus package as part of her first economic initiative policies aimed at "responsible proactive fiscal policy", with three main pillars: measures to counter inflation, investment in growth industries, and national security. Other proposals included the expansion of local government grants for small and medium-sized businesses and additional investments in technology such as artificial intelligence and semiconductors.

In March 2026, Takaichi administration announced the Science, Technology and Innovation Basic Plan that sets guidelines for science and technology policies for fiscal 2026 to 2030, aiming to double spending on research and development to ¥60 trillion ($376 billion) by 2030.

On 30 June 2026, the House of Representatives passed the Law Concerning the Punishment of Damage to the National Flag, which criminalizes the desecration of the flag of Japan. On 17 July 2026, the House of Councillors passed the act, enacting it into law.

=== Foreign policy ===
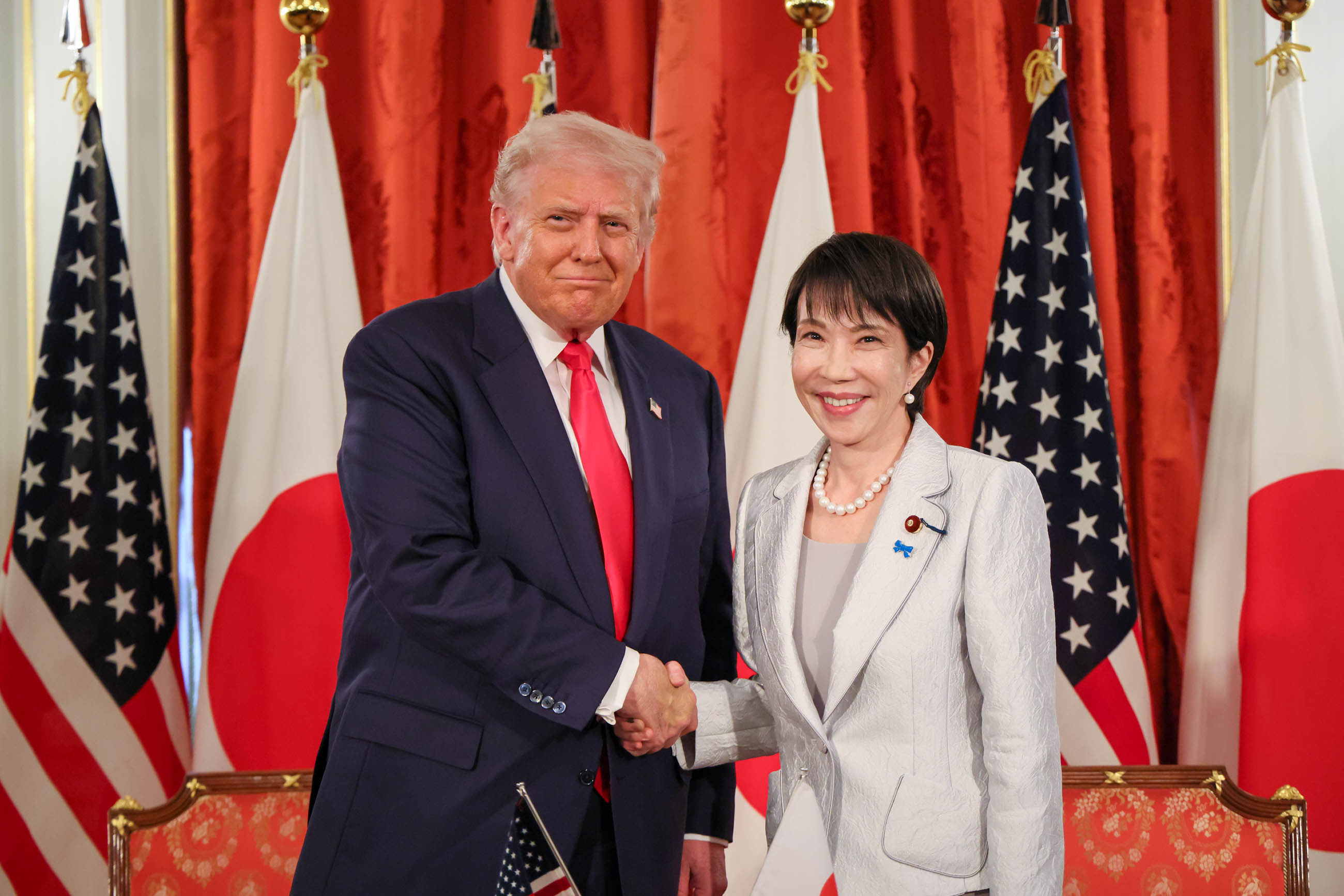
Takaichi with U.S. president Donald Trump during their bilateral meeting at the Akasaka Palace in Tokyo, 28 October 2025

Takaichi made her diplomatic debut at the 47th ASEAN Summit in Kuala Lumpur, Malaysia, where she made efforts to strengthen cooperation on the maritime, artificial intelligence, and cybersecurity sectors. She also held bilateral meetings with Philippine president Bongbong Marcos, Malaysian prime minister Anwar Ibrahim, and Australian prime minister Anthony Albanese. During the ASEAN meeting, Takaichi also attended the ASEAN+3 Summit, the ASEAN–Japan Summit, the 20th East Asia Summit, and the Second ASEAN Global Dialogue. Takaichi skipped the remaining events of the summit, flying back to Tokyo to meet with U.S. president Donald Trump the next day.

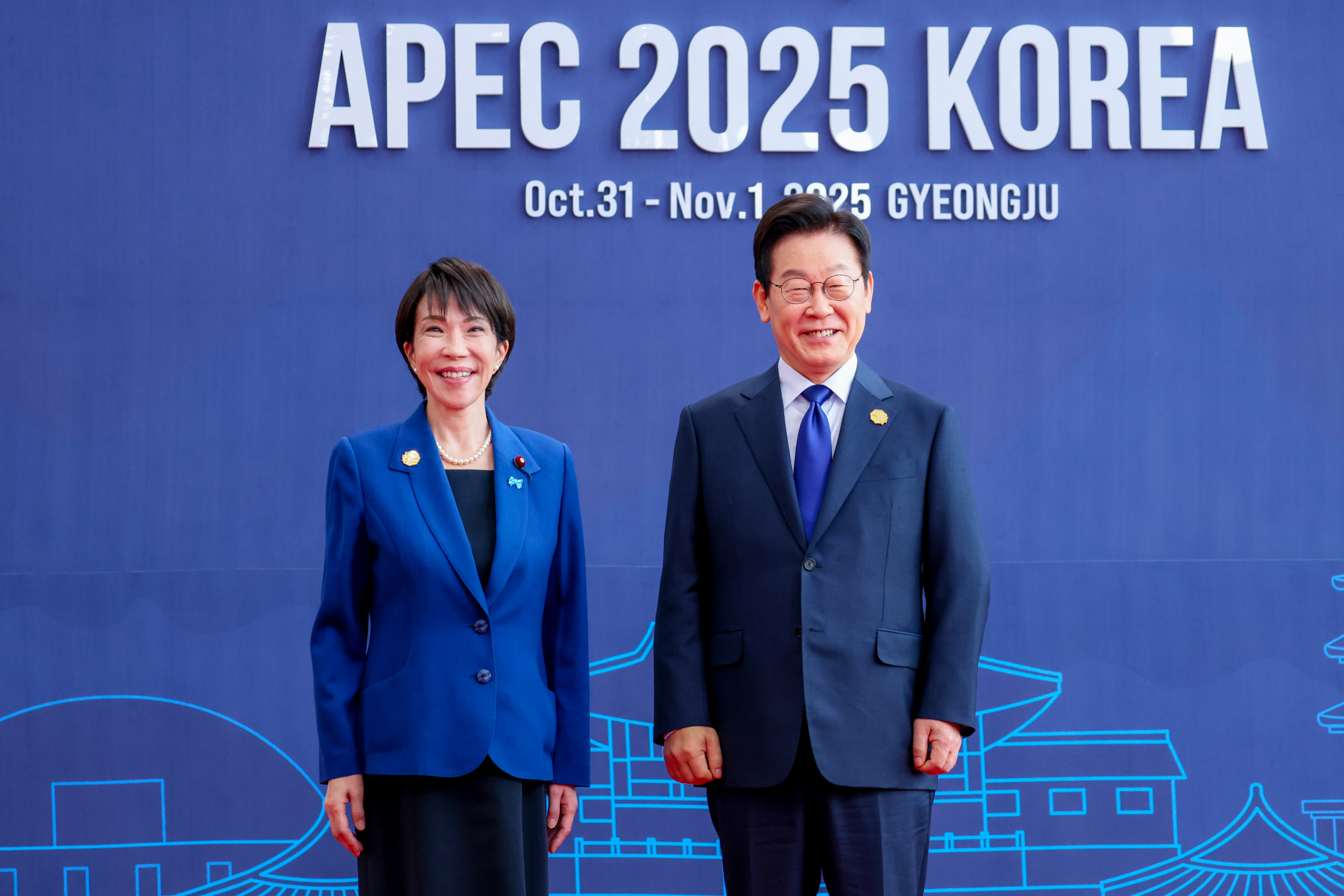
Takaichi with South Korean president Lee Jae Myung during the 2025 APEC South Korea Summit in Gyeongju, 31 October 2025

Takaichi met with Trump on 28 October 2025 at the Akasaka Palace. The two leaders signed agreements on trade, minerals, nuclear technology and rare earths. Takaichi also expressed her intent to strengthen the US–Japan alliance. After their meeting, Takaichi gave Trump a putter formerly owned by former prime minister Shinzo Abe, a golf ball signed by Japanese professional golfer Hideki Matsuyama, and a gold-leaf golf ball. During their visit at the US Yokosuka Naval Base, aboard the USS George Washington (CVN-73), Takaichi vowed to bring the US–Japan alliance into a "golden age", amid a "severe security environment". According to Trump's press secretary, she also told Trump privately she would recommend him for the Nobel Peace Prize.

Chinese leader Xi Jinping made an unusual move by not sending a congratulatory telegram on the day Takaichi assumed the post of prime minister, but a Japan-China summit meeting between Xi and Takaichi was held on 31 October. There, the two sides agreed to promote a "mutually beneficial relationship based on common strategic interests." However, since Prime Minister Takaichi held talks with Taiwan's former Vice Premier Lin Hsin-i on 1 November, China lodged a protest with Japan, and Japan counter-argued, leading to the deterioration of the relationship.

==== Diplomatic crisis with China ====
During deliberations in the House of Representatives' budget committee on 7 November, Takaichi said that a Chinese attack on Taiwan could constitute an "existential crisis situation" for Japan, allowing the country to take military action in self-defence. In response to the comments, the Chinese consul-general in Osaka, Xue Jian, wrote on X on that "we have no choice but to cut off that dirty neck that has lunged at us without a moment's hesitation. Are you ready?" (Note: Original Japanese text: 勝手に突っ込んできたその汚い首は一瞬のちゅうちょもなく斬ってやるしかない。覚悟ができているのか) Although the post was later deleted after protest by the Japanese government, it led to a diplomatic row between Japan and China. In addition to cross-party calls in Japan for his expulsion, Xue's comment triggered criticism from the Taiwanese government and the US ambassador to Japan, while Chinese officials condemned Takaichi's remarks. Japan and China issued mutual travel advisories and summoned the other country's ambassador. China subsequently dispatched China Coast Guard vessels and military drones to patrol through the Senkaku Islands.

The Chinese government and state media criticized Takaichi's remarks intensively, demanding Takaichi retract her statement. China launched a cultural boycott of Japan, cancelling numerous events related to Japanese culture as well as the cancellations of events in China featuring Japanese musicians. Tourism from China to Japan dropped as a result of the dispute. On 6 January 2026, China's Ministry of Commerce announced that all dual-use items are banned from being exported to Japan for military use effective immediately.

=== Immigration policy ===
In January 2026, Takaichi unveiled the Comprehensive Measures for Accepting Foreign Nationals and Orderly Coexistence, replacing the guidelines adopted in December 2018. The measures call for a "orderly coexistence" with foreign nationals residing in Japan, while integrating "optimized" management of foreign nationals, primarily by making completion of a Japanese language program mandatory to obtain permanent residency and by lengthening the period of continuous residence required to obtain Japanese citizenship.

While she calls for stricter measures against crimes committed by foreigners, she does not oppose policies that expand the acceptance of foreign workers. She is negative toward so‑called “total caps” on foreign residents. At the LDP leadership debate on 30 September 2024, she stated that she was “not considering setting quotas for people who stay legally.” Compared with the other five candidates, she made more tolerant comments regarding the acceptance of foreigners, and she is evaluated as not intending to curb the increase in the foreign population. The figure of 1.23 million that she presented as the upper limit for Specified Skilled Worker and Training and Employment applies only until the end of FY2028, and further acceptance is expected thereafter.Takaichi, as a cabinet minister, has supported policies that increase the inflow of foreigners—such as “Training and Employment” and the expansion of industries covered by the Technical Intern Training Program. Contrary to her general public image, she is evaluated as a promoter of policies expanding the acceptance of foreign labor.

In November 2025, Takaichi sent a congratulatory telegram to the “National Association for Support of Coexistence with Foreign Human Resources” (NAGOMi) for its 21st national forum in Tokyo. The association was established with the efforts of Toshihiro Nikai and aims to "develop a nationwide 'global human resources coexistence network,' cooperate with the government and prefectures, appropriately train, protect, and support foreign workers including technical interns, and contribute to the realization of a multicultural society without discrimination".

On 23 January, the Takaichi Cabinet decided to expand the sectors covered by Specified Skilled Worker and Training and Employment. “Linen supply,” “logistics warehouses,” and “resource circulation” were added.

Regarding comprehensive restrictions on land acquisition by foreigners, she argued that such measures would be difficult. Takaichi stated that “banning land acquisition in Japan solely for foreigners or foreign corporations would violate several bilateral investment treaties and also the WTO’s GATS,” and therefore regulations would have to be nationality‑neutral. In the guidelines announced on 20 January 2026, no restrictions on land ownership by foreigners or foreign corporations were included, and only efforts to understand the actual situation were mentioned. In June 2026, the Takaichi administration decided to postpone, for the time being, regulations on the acquisition of condominiums and other real estate by foreigners.

Since around 2010, the LDP has promoted policies to expand the acceptance of foreigners under the pretext of securing labor. Under the Abe administration, the number of foreign workers increased by more than one million., and the number of foreign residents, which was around 2 million at the end of FY2012, reached approximately 3.96 million by the end of FY2025 In the policy guidelines announced by the LDP’s Foreign Resident Policy Headquarters on 20 January 2026, no policy to restrict the increase in foreigners was included. Instead, it stated that "appropriate and smooth acceptance of foreigners and the realization of orderly local communities" are "essential," and only stricter measures against crimes committed by foreigners were mentioned.

Takaichi says that Japan requires foreign workers.Until 2028, her government plans to accept 1.23 million labour migrants.

She is a supporter of globalism. At the House of Councillors Budget Committee meeting on 13 November 2025, in response to a question that criticized “policy promotion driven by excessive globalism,” Takaichi stated that “globalization has contributed to the development of the world economy.”

=== Public opinion ===
Takaichi has enjoyed high approval ratings during her tenure. According to a Sankei Shimbun and FNN poll conducted in October 2025, Takaichi's cabinet had an approval rating of 75.4%; the approval rating of Japanese women aged 18-29 was 91.7%. In opinion polls conducted during late October–early November 2025, Takaichi's government received the approval of between 65% and 83% of respondents, among the highest such ratings of any government in twenty years. According to a poll conducted by The Yomiuri Shimbun in February 2026, approval for her cabinet stood at 73%. The survey also found that 52% of respondents wanted Takaichi to stay "as long as possible".
