= Liberal Democratic Party–Japan Innovation Party coalition =

Right-wing governing coalition in Japan

Liberal Democratic Party–Japan Innovation Party coalition 自維連立政権 Jii renritsu seiken
- Leaders: Sanae Takaichi (LDP); Hirofumi Yoshimura (JIP); Fumitake Fujita (JIP)
- Founded: 21 October 2025; 12 months ago
- Ideology: Conservatism (Japanese); Right-wing populism
- Political position: Right-wing
- Alliance parties: Liberal Democratic Party; Japan Innovation Party
- Councillors: 120 / 248
- Representatives: 352 / 465

Second Takaichi Cabinet (Reshuffle), where the JIP occupies one cabinet minister, two state ministers and three parliamentary vice-ministers in the cabinet since September 17, 2026.

The Liberal Democratic Party (LDP) and the Japan Innovation Party (JIP) formed a coalition on 20 October 2025. Established after the collapse of the LDP–Komeito coalition, it constitutes the basis of the governing Takaichi Cabinet, which was formed on 21 October 2025. Until the September 2026 cabinet reshuffle, the LDP held all cabinet posts, at which point the JIP entered the cabinet. The two parties are aligned on national policies and National Diet strategies.

== History ==
=== Formation ===
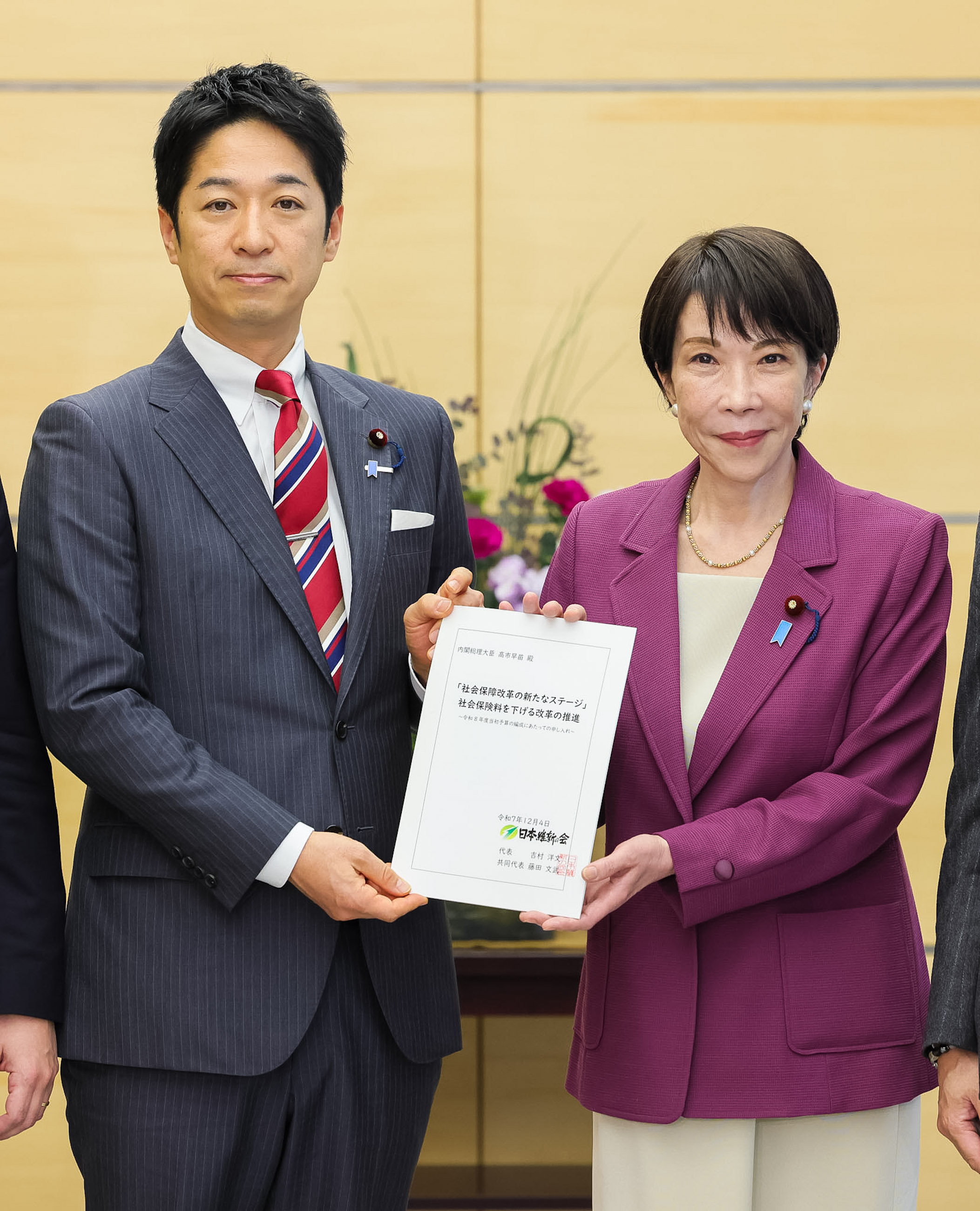
Prime Minister and Liberal Democratic Party President Sanae Takaichi and Japan Innovation Party Co-Representative Fumitake Fujita

On 10 October 2025, Komeito leader Tetsuo Saito announced that his party would withdraw from its coalition with the LDP, over disagreements with Sanae Takaichi, who was elected LDP president in a leadership election immediately prior. Following Komeito's withdrawal, the LDP invited the Japan Innovation Party to join the coalition. The JIP was third-largest party in the Diet, and leans further to the political right than Komeito. On 15 October, Takaichi met with JIP leader Hirofumi Yoshimura and co-leader Fumitake Fujita. The two sides agreed to discuss the possibility of forming a coalition government starting from 16 October. After the meeting, the leaders of the two parties said that there was much common ground between them on issues such as basic policies, foreign and security policies, and constitutional revision. The JIP said that, if a coalition agreement were agreed, it would support Takaichi in her bid to be nominated prime minister by the Diet. Takaichi also announced that she would establish an investigatory body for the "second capital city concept" proposed by the JIP, and said that she would invite "two or more" members of the JIP to sit in her cabinet. On 16 October, after several days of discussion, the LDP accepted the 12 policies demanded by the JIP.

On 17 October, the JIP withdrew from the coalition negotiations that were being held by the opposition Constitution Democratic Party and Democratic Party for the People. On 18 October, the LDP and the JIP agreed to form a coalition government. The JIP said that its members would not take up ministerial posts or sit in the cabinet. The two parties reached a basic agreement on the morning of 20 October. It was expected that the coalition government agreement would be signed on the afternoon of the same day. Although JIP members would not sit in cabinet, the party's Diet Affairs Committee chairman, Takashi Endo, was made an assistant to the prime minister, acting as a liaison and coordinator between the two parties. On 20 October, Takaichi and Yoshimura held a meeting of party leaders in the Diet, during which they jointly signed an agreement to form a coalition government upon Takaichi's appointment as prime minister. On 21 October, the 219th session of the Japanese Diet convened, with the primary agenda being the nomination of the prime minister. Takaichi was nominated by the House of Representatives with a majority in the first round of voting, and was subsequently nominated by the House of Councillors after two rounds of voting. Later that day, the Takaichi Cabinet was formally established upon her appointment as prime minister by Emperor Naruhito at the Imperial Palace.

=== 2026 general election ===
On 23 January 2026, Prime Minister Sanae Takaichi shared plans to dissolve parliament in late January and call for snap elections in early February. The coalition was a few seats short of a majority in the House of Representatives. The 2026 Japanese general election took place on 8 February 2026. In this election, the Liberal Democratic Party won 316 seats, setting a new record for the most seats won by a single party in the post-war Japanese electoral history, and also the first time since the war that a party has won more than two-thirds of the seats in the House of Representatives. The coalition won a total of 352 seats. Following the election, on 9 February, Takaichi asked the Japan Innovation Party to provide a minister to join the cabinet in what The Japan Times described as a "new phase of closer ties and shared responsibility between the two parties".

== Coalition agreement ==
=== Economic and fiscal policy ===
- The parties agreed to pass a bill to abolish the provisional gasoline tax rate during the extraordinary Diet session in 2013.
- The parties agreed to put together price control measures, including electricity and gas fee subsidies, and pass a supplementary budget at the extraordinary Diet session in 2025.
- The parties agreed to promptly compile and implement comprehensive measures necessary to respond to inflation. In particular, The parties agreed to finalize by the end of 2025 the design of a system for reviewing basic income tax deductions and other measures in line with the progress of inflation. The parties will also expedite the design of a system for introducing tax credits with benefits and work to realize it.
- The parties agreed to conduct a comprehensive review of special tax measures and large subsidies and to establish a Government Efficiency Bureau (tentative name) to handle the abolition of those with low policy effectiveness.
- Regarding food and beverages, the parties stated they will consider legislation to exempt them from consumption tax for two years.
- The parties agreed that the policy of providing 40,000 yen each to children and adults in households exempt from resident tax, and 20,000 yen each to everyone else, would not be implemented.

=== Social security policy ===
- The government aims to halt the rise in insurance premium rates for the working generation and lower them by promoting reforms to the social security system as a whole, while realizing the specific system design for medical system reform outlined in the so- called "Three-Party Agreement (of the LDP, Komeito, and the Japan Innovation Party) on the Medical Care Act" and the "Three-Party Agreement on the Basic Policy" concluded at the 2025 ordinary Diet session, including a review of drug copayments including "OTC-like drugs" and thorough ability-based payment systems that reflect financial income.
- Sharing a sense of crisis over the rapid increase in social security-related expenses and concerns about the excessive increase in the burden placed on the working generation in particular, and aiming for fundamental reforms to break this current situation, the two parties agreed they will continue the agreement on social security reform that has been in place since the 2025 ordinary Diet session and will hold regular consultation bodies on social security reform.

=== Imperial family, constitution, and family system policy ===
- Taking into account the importance of the fact that male-line succession has been maintained without exception since ancient times, and assuming that the current order of succession will not be changed, in order to ensure stable succession to the throne, the parties aim to revise the Imperial Household Law during the ordinary Diet session in 2026, with the first priority being a proposal that is consistent with the history of the Imperial Family and realistic, which would "allow adoption, which is not permitted for the Imperial Family, and allow males of the male lineage belonging to the Imperial line to become Imperial Family."
- Based on the Japan Innovation Party's proposal "21st Century National Defense Concept and Constitutional Revision," a joint drafting council for the revision of Article 9 of the Constitution will be established between the two parties. Per the agreement, this will be established during the extraordinary Diet session in 2025.
- In order to achieve constitutional amendment regarding emergency clauses (maintenance of Diet functions and emergency government ordinances), the two parties will establish a drafting council for the clauses during the extraordinary Diet session in 2025, with the aim of submitting draft clauses to the Diet during fiscal 2026.
- While maintaining the family register system and the principle of the same family register and same surname, the two parties will create a system that gives legal effect to the use of maiden names in all aspects of social life. To that end, the parties will submit a bill to the ordinary Diet session in 2026 to legalize the use of maiden names as common names, with the aim of passing it.
- The two parties agreed to enact a National Emblem Protection Law to criminalize the desecration of the Japanese flag.

=== Foreign affairs and national security policy ===
- The parties agreed that in response to the most severe and complex strategic environment since the end of the war, the three strategic documents would be revised ahead of schedule.
- With a view to cultivating new diplomatic means for building peace in the international community, a peace mediation department will be established within the Ministry of Foreign Affairs by the end of fiscal year 2025.
- In order to strengthen the defense production and technological base, the five types of "Guidelines for the Implementation of the Three Principles on Transfer of Defense Equipment" will be abolished during the ordinary Diet session in 2026, and measures regarding the civilian operation of state-owned factories and facilities related to the defense industry will be promoted.
- The parties stated that they share a sense of crisis regarding the serious situation regarding the recruitment of Self-Defense Forces (SDF) personnel, the need for fundamental strengthening of the human resources base, including improving working conditions, and measures to enhance the pride of SDF personnel, and aim for fundamental reform to break the current situation by considering the establishment of a pension system for SDF personnel. The parties also agreed to implement international standardization of the current SDF "ranks," "uniforms," and "job types" by the end of fiscal year 2026.

=== Intelligence policy ===
- The parties share the recognition that Japan's intelligence capabilities are weak and that strengthening national intelligence capabilities is an urgent matter, and would discuss comprehensive intelligence reform and implement agreed-upon measures.
- The parties agreed that in the ordinary Diet session of 2026, the Cabinet Intelligence and Research Office and the director of Cabinet intelligence would be upgraded to create a "National Intelligence Agency" and a "Director of National Intelligence Agency." In order to align the policy and intelligence agencies in the security field, the "National Intelligence Agency" and the "Director of National Intelligence Agency" will be on the same level as the "National Security Agency" and the "Director of National Security Agency."
- The parties agreed that the current Cabinet Intelligence Council (a matter decided by the Cabinet) would be dissolved in an advanced manner, and a law would be enacted during the ordinary Diet session in 2026 to establish a national intelligence council.
- The parties agreed to establish an independent foreign intelligence agency (tentative name) by the end of fiscal year 2027.
- In order to systematically train intelligence personnel, the parties will establish a cross-intelligence community (cross-ministerial) intelligence officer training institute by the end of fiscal year 2027.
- The parties will begin deliberations on intelligence and anti-espionage legislation (including the Basic Law, Foreign Agents Registration Act, and Lobbying Disclosure Act) in 2025, and will promptly draft and enact bills.

=== Energy security policy ===
- In light of the increasing demand for electricity, the parties agreed to proceed with restarting nuclear power plants, with safety as a major prerequisite. The parties also agreed to accelerate the development of next-generation innovative reactors and nuclear fusion reactors. The parties agreed also to promote the development of renewable energy sources in which Japan has an advantage, such as geothermal energy.
- Accelerate domestic marine resource development (energy and mineral resources).

=== Food security and land policy ===
- The parties agreed to share the recognition that ensuring a stable supply of food is essential for the survival of the nation, create an environment in which all fields can be utilized effectively, and make large-scale investments in indoor food production facilities (such as plant factories and land-based aquaculture) that can withstand harsh climates.
- Recognizing the importance of preserving the beautiful land that Japan has nurtured since ancient times, and in order to curb environmental destruction and disaster risks caused by deforestation and inappropriate development, and to ensure appropriate land use and maintenance, the parties agreed to implement measures to legally regulate large-scale solar power plants (mega solar) in the 2026 ordinary session of the Diet.

=== Economic security policy ===
- The parties agreed to promote measures to strengthen the resilience of undersea cables in the Ryukyu Islands.

=== Population and foreigner policy ===
- Recognizing that Japan's greatest problem is population decline, the parties agreed to establish a Population Decline Countermeasures Headquarters (tentative name) within the government during the extraordinary Diet session in 2025 to consider and implement fundamental and powerful measures to address population decline, including child-rearing policies.
- Based on the idea that it is important to take a strict stance against foreigners who do not abide by rules and laws, even for foreigners who have become accustomed to and contributed to Japanese society, the following measures will be taken.
  - (1) Strengthen the control tower within the Cabinet and appoint a minister in charge.
  - (2) A "population strategy" will be formulated by the end of fiscal year 2026, which will clearly state numerical targets and basic policies regarding the acceptance of foreigners, including quantitative management of foreign residents in light of friction with society if the proportion of foreigners increases.
  - (3) Strengthen the response to illegal activities involving foreigners and strengthen the institutional foundation.
  - (4) Strengthen measures to prevent misuse, abuse, and misuse of systems related to foreigners.
- The government aims to establish the Committee on Foreign Investment in Japan (a Japanese version of CFIUS) during the ordinary Diet session in 2026. It will also draft a bill during the ordinary Diet session in 2026 to strengthen restrictions on land acquisition by foreigners and foreign capital.

=== Education policy ===
- In order to implement the so-called free high school education system from April 2026, an agreement will be reached on the remaining issues by October 2025, and the system design will be finalized.
- In order to implement free school lunches for elementary schools from April 2026, the parties agreed to sort out the remaining issues and finalize the system design.
- The parties agreed to significantly expand child-rearing support measures, including the reduction of childcare fees as part of the "Three-Party Agreement" concluded at the 2020 ordinary Diet session.
- In accordance with the "three-party agreement" concluded at the ordinary Diet session in 2025, the parties agreed to formulate a grand design for high school education reform to ensure educational opportunities and improve the quality of education across the country.
- In response to the declining population, the parties aim to optimize the number and size of universities.
- In order to ensure sufficient research funding for basic research, which is the foundation of a nation that is creative in science and technology, the parties agreed to significantly expand grants-in-aid for scientific research.

=== Governance reform ===
- With a view to establishing a backup system for the capital's crisis management functions, decentralizing the capital's functions, and forming a multi-polar, decentralized economic zone, a consultative body will be established between the two parties during the extraordinary Diet session in 2025 to clarify the responsibilities and functions of the capital and deputy capitals, and then conduct prompt deliberations and pass a bill during the ordinary Diet session in 2026.

=== Political reform ===
- Regarding the handling of corporate donations, the Liberal Democratic Party has advocated "disclosure rather than prohibition," while the Japan Innovation Party has advocated "complete abolition." While both parties share the view that institutional reform is necessary to dispel concerns that large donations from certain corporations distort policy decision-making and to pursue a system of political funding that is trustworthy to the public, they have yet to reach a final conclusion. Therefore, the two parties will establish a consultative body during the extraordinary Diet session in 2025 to discuss the nature of political party fundraising, including donations from corporations and political organizations, restrictions on recipients, monetary limits, and the nature of party revenue and disclosure through party journals and other sources. A third-party committee will also conduct further deliberations and reach a conclusion during Takaichi's term as party president.
- The parties agreed to continue to review the Political Party Law in order to clarify governance within political parties.
- In order to reduce the number of House of Representatives members by 10%, a private member's bill will be submitted to the extraordinary Diet session in 2025, with the aim of it being passed.
- In order to establish an electoral system that is in line with the times, the two parties agreed to lead discussions in various forums, including the "Council on the House of Representatives Electoral System," which has been established in the House of Representatives Rules and Administration Committee, and will consider options including the abolition of the current mixed electoral system of single-seat districts and proportional representation and the introduction of a multi-member district system. To this end, a consultative body consisting of both parties will be established during fiscal 2025.

== Election results ==
=== House of Representatives ===
Election	Leaders		Constituency				Party list				Total		Position	Status
Election	LDP	JIP	Votes	%	Seats	+/-	Votes	%	Seats	+/-	Seats	+/-	Position	Status
2026	Sanae Takaichi	Hirofumi Yoshimura; Fumitake Fujita	31,531,343	55.86	269 / 289	New	25,969,470	45.35	83 / 176	New	352 / 465	New	1st	Majority
