= Second Takaichi cabinet =

Cabinet of Japan since February 2026

- 105th Cabinet of Japan
- 18 February 2026 – present
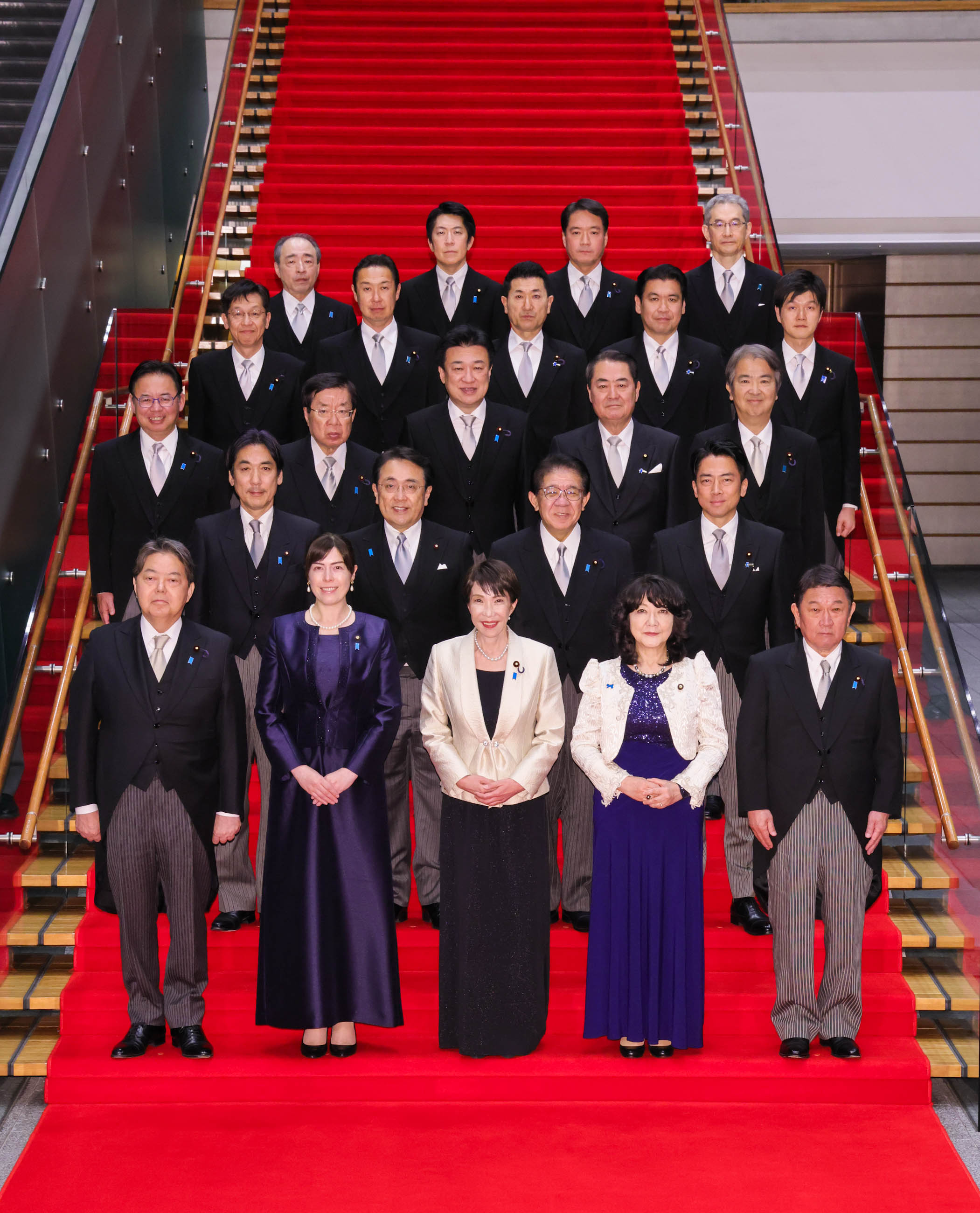
- Takaichi (front row, centre) with the elected cabinet inside the Kantei, 18 February 2026
- Date formed: 18 February 2026

People and organisations
- Emperor: Naruhito
- Prime Minister: Sanae Takaichi
- Prime Minister's history: Member of the HoR (1993–2003, 2005–present); Former Minister for Internal Affairs and Communications (2014–2017, 2019–2020)
- Member party: Liberal Democratic Party; Japan Innovation Party
- Status in legislature: HoR (Lower): Supermajority; Senate (Upper): Minority
- Opposition leader: Junya Ogawa (2026–present)

History
- Election: 2026 Japanese general election
- Predecessor: Takaichi I

The Second Takaichi cabinet is the 105th and present Cabinet of Japan, formed on 18 February 2026 when Sanae Takaichi was reappointed Prime Minister by Emperor Naruhito as designated by the National Diet following the 2026 general election.

The first reshuffle took place on 17 September 2026 and one Cabinet minister, two State ministers, three Parliamentary Vice-Ministers from the Japan Innovation Party joined the Cabinet for the first time under the LDP–JIP coalition.

== Election of the Prime Minister ==
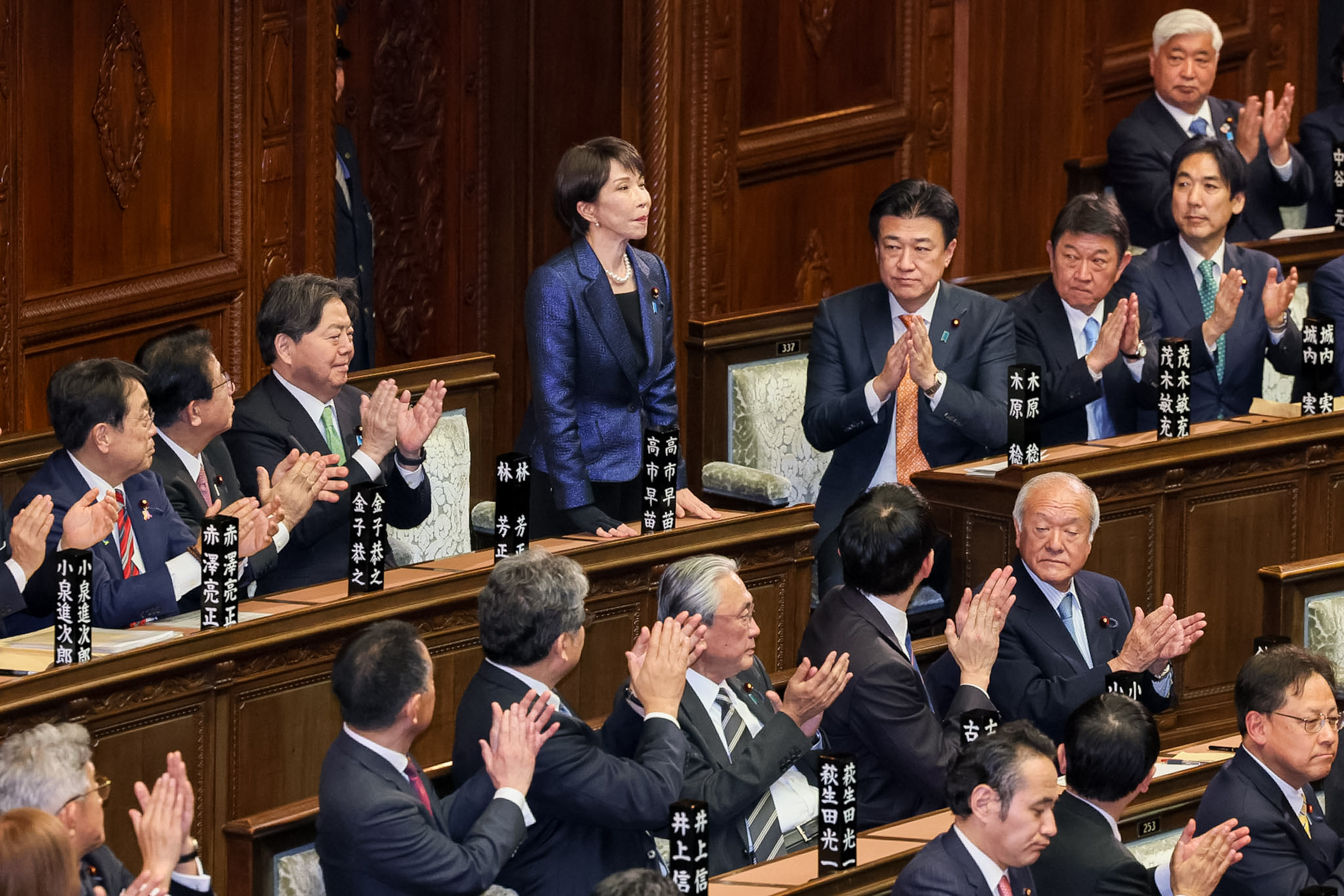
Takaichi following her second Diet election as prime minister

=== House of Representatives ===
18 February 2026 221st Special National Diet Absolute majority (233/465) required
House of Representatives
Choice	Party	Votes
Sanae Takaichi	Liberal Democratic Party	354 / 465
Junya Ogawa	Centrist Reform Alliance	50 / 465
Yuichiro Tamaki	Democratic Party For the People	28 / 465
Sohei Kamiya	Sanseitō	15 / 465
Takahiro Anno	Team Mirai	11 / 465
Tomoko Tamura	Japanese Communist Party	4 / 465
Takashi Kawamura	Tax Cuts Japan and Yukoku Alliance	1 / 465
Fumiyo Okuda	Reiwa Shinsengumi	1 / 465

=== Senate ===
18 February 2026 221st Special National Diet Absolute majority (125/248) required
Senate
Choice	Party	Votes	
Choice	Party	First ballot	Runoff
Sanae Takaichi	Liberal Democratic Party	123 / 248	125 / 248
Junya Ogawa	Centrist Reform Alliance	58 / 248	65 / 248
Yuichiro Tamaki	Democratic Party For the People	25 / 248	Eliminated
Sohei Kamiya	Sanseitō	15 / 248	Eliminated
Tomoko Tamura	Japanese Communist Party	7 / 248	Eliminated
Fumiyo Okuda	Reiwa Shinsengumi	5 / 248	Eliminated
Shunichi Mizuoka	Constitutional Democratic Party of Japan	5 / 248	Eliminated
Yōichi Iha	Independent	2 / 248	Eliminated
Naoki Hyakuta	Conservative Party of Japan	2 / 248	Eliminated
Mizuho Fukushima	Social Democratic Party	2 / 248	Eliminated
Takahiro Anno	Team Mirai	1 / 248	Eliminated
Blank ballot		1 / 248	8 / 248
Invalid ballot			48 / 248

== List of ministers ==
Parties
Liberal Democratic
Japan Innovation

R	Member of the House of Representatives
S	Member of the Senate
B	Bureaucrat

=== Cabinet ===
Second Takaichi Cabinet from 18 February 2026 to 17 September 2026
Portfolio	Portrait	Minister		Took office	Left office	Note
Cabinet ministers
Prime Minister		Sanae Takaichi	R	18 February 2026		
Minister for Internal Affairs and Communications		Yoshimasa Hayashi	R	18 February 2026	17 September 2026	
Minister of Justice		Hiroshi Hiraguchi	R	18 February 2026	17 September 2026	
Minister for Foreign Affairs		Toshimitsu Motegi	R	18 February 2026		
Minister of Finance; Minister of State for Financial Services; Minister in charge of Overcoming Deflation		Satsuki Katayama	S	18 February 2026		
Minister of Education, Culture, Sports, Science and Technology		Yohei Matsumoto	R	18 February 2026	17 September 2026	
Minister of Health, Labour and Welfare		Kenichiro Ueno	R	18 February 2026		
Minister of Agriculture, Forestry and Fisheries		Norikazu Suzuki	R	18 February 2026	17 September 2026	
Minister of Economy, Trade and Industry; Minister in charge of the Response to the Economic Impact Caused by the Nuclear Accident; Minister in charge of Green Transformation; Minister in charge of Industrial Competitiveness; Minister of State for the Nuclear Damage Compensation and Decommissioning Facilitation Corporation		Ryosei Akazawa	R	18 February 2026		
Minister of Land, Infrastructure, Transport and Tourism; Minister in charge of Water Cycle Policy; Minister in charge of the World Horticultural Exhibition Yokohama 2027		Yasushi Kaneko	R	18 February 2026	17 September 2026	
Minister of the Environment; Minister of State for Nuclear Emergency Preparedness		Hirotaka Ishihara	R	18 February 2026	17 September 2026	
Minister of Defense		Shinjirō Koizumi	R	18 February 2026		
Chief Cabinet Secretary; Minister in charge of Mitigating the Impact of U.S. Forces in Okinawa; Minister in charge of the Abduction Issue		Minoru Kihara	R	18 February 2026		
Minister for Digital Transformation; Minister in charge of Digital Administrative and Fiscal Reform; Minister in charge of Administrative Reform; Minister in charge of the National Civil Service System; Minister in charge of Cybersecurity; Minister of State for Regulatory Reform; Minister in State for Cybersecurity		Hisashi Matsumoto	R	18 February 2026	17 September 2026	
Minister of Reconstruction; Minister in charge of Comprehensive Policy Coordination for Revival from the Nuclear Accident at Fukushima		Takao Makino	S	18 February 2026		
Chairman of the National Public Safety Commission; Minister in charge of Building National Resilience; Minister in charge of Territorial Issues; Minister of State for Disaster Management; Minister of State for Ocean Policy		Jiro Akama	R	18 February 2026		
Minister of State for Okinawa and Northern Territories Affairs; Minister of State for Consumer Affairs and Food Safety; Minister of State for Policies Related to Children, Declining Birthrate, Youth Empowerment, and Gender Equality; Minister of State for Regional Revitalization; Minister of State for Ainu-Related Policies; Minister of State for Promoting Cohesive and Mutual Assistance Society; Minister in charge of Women's Empowerment; Minister in charge of Cohesive Society		Hitoshi Kikawada	R	18 February 2026		
Minister in charge of Economic Revitalization; Minister in charge of New Capitalism; Minister in charge of Wage Increase; Minister in charge of Startups; Minister in charge of Social Security Reform Oriented to All Generations; Minister in charge of Infectious Disease Crisis Management; Minister in charge of the Preparation of Establishing the Disaster Management Agency; Minister of State for Economic and Fiscal Policy; Minister of State for Regulatory Reform		Minoru Kiuchi	R	18 February 2026		
Minister in charge of Economic Security; Minister in charge of a Society of Well-Ordered and Harmonious Coexistence with Foreign Nationals; Minister of State for "Cool Japan" Strategy; Minister of State for Intellectual Property Strategy; Minister of State for Science and Technology Policy; Minister of State for Space Policy; Minister of State for AI Strategy; Minister of State for Economic Security		Kimi Onoda	S	18 February 2026		

==== Deputy Chief Cabinet Secretary and Director-General of the Cabinet Legislation Bureau ====
Portfolio	Portrait	Name		Took office	Left office	Previous office
Deputy Chief Cabinet Secretary		Masanao Ozaki	R	18 February 2026		
Deputy Chief Cabinet Secretary		Kei Satō	S	18 February 2026	17 September 2026	
Deputy Chief Cabinet Secretary		Yasuhiro Tsuyuki	B	18 February 2026		Commissioner General of the National Police Agency
Director-General of the Cabinet Legislation Bureau		Nobuyuki Iwao	B	18 February 2026		Public Prosecutors Office

==== Special Advisor to the Prime Minister ====
Portfolio	Adviser		Term	Note
Special Advisor to the Prime Minister	Sadamasa Oue	B	18 February 2026–17 September 2026	
Special Advisor to the Prime Minister	Takahiro Inoue	R	18 February 2026–17 September 2026	
Special Advisor to the Prime Minister	Takashi Endo	R	18 February 2026–present	
Special Advisor to the Prime Minister	Midori Matsushima	R	18 February 2026–17 September 2026	
Special Advisor to the Prime Minister	Yoshimasa Uno	B	18 February 2026–present	

==== State ministers ====
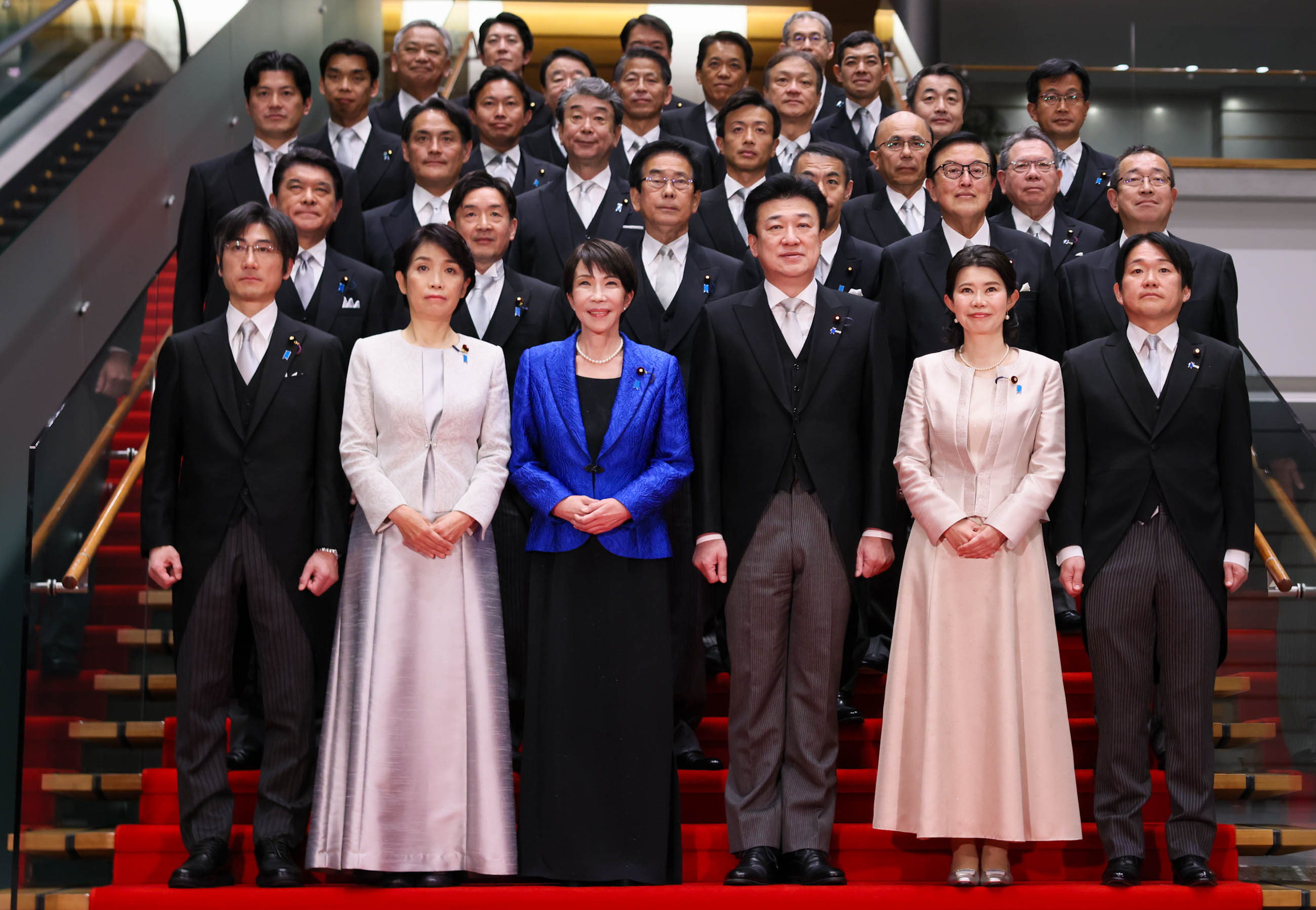
Photo of the deputy ministers of the second Takaichi cabinet.

Portfolio	State Minister		Took office	Left office	Concurrent post
State Minister for Digital Transformation	Soichiro Imaeda	R	19 February 2026	Incumbent	State Minister of Cabinet Office
State Minister for Reconstruction	Yoshinori Tadokoro	R	19 February 2026	Incumbent	
State Minister for Reconstruction	Takakazu Seto	R	19 February 2026	Incumbent	State Minister of Cabinet Office
State Minister for Reconstruction	Yasuyuki Sakai	S	19 February 2026	Incumbent	State Minister of Cabinet Office; State Minister of Land, Infrastructure, Transport and Tourism
State Minister of Cabinet Office	Soichiro Imaeda	R	19 February 2026	Incumbent	State Minister for Digital Transformation
State Minister of Cabinet Office	Takakazu Seto	R	19 February 2026	Incumbent	State Minister for Reconstruction
State Minister of Cabinet Office	Kazuchika Iwata	R	19 February 2026	Incumbent	
State Minister of Cabinet Office	Hayato Suzuki	R	19 February 2026	Incumbent	
State Minister of Cabinet Office	Jun Tsushima	R	19 February 2026	Incumbent	
State Minister of Cabinet Office	Toshiro Ino	R	19 February 2026	Incumbent	State Minister of Economy, Trade and Industry
State Minister of Cabinet Office	Kenji Yamada	R	19 February 2026	Incumbent	State Minister of Economy, Trade and Industry
State Minister of Cabinet Office	Yasuyuki Sakai	S	19 February 2026	Incumbent	State Minister for Reconstruction; State Minister of Land, Infrastructure, Transport and Tourism
State Minister of Cabinet Office	Kiyoto Tsuji	R	19 February 2026	Incumbent	State Minister of the Environment
State Minister of Cabinet Office	Masahisa Miyazaki	R	19 February 2026	Incumbent	State Minister of Defense
State Minister for Internal Affairs and Communications	Noriko Horiuchi	R	19 February 2026	Incumbent	
State Minister for Internal Affairs and Communications	Katsunori Takahashi	S	19 February 2026	Incumbent	
State Minister of Justice	Hidehiro Mitani	R	19 February 2026	Incumbent	
State Minister for Foreign Affairs	Ayano Kunimitsu	R	19 February 2026	Incumbent	
State Minister for Foreign Affairs	Iwao Horii	S	19 February 2026	Incumbent	
State Minister of Finance	Shinichi Nakatani	R	19 February 2026	Incumbent	
State Minister of Finance	Shōji Maitachi	S	19 February 2026	Incumbent	
State Minister of Education, Culture, Sports, Science and Technology	Shigeki Kobayashi	R	19 February 2026	Incumbent	
State Minister of Education, Culture, Sports, Science and Technology	Hiroyuki Nakamura	R	19 February 2026	Incumbent	
State Minister of Health, Labour and Welfare	Yasumasa Nagasaka	R	19 February 2026	Incumbent	
State Minister of Health, Labour and Welfare	Hirobumi Niki	R	19 February 2026	Incumbent	
State Minister of Agriculture, Forestry and Fisheries	Yukinori Nemoto	R	19 February 2026	Incumbent	
State Minister of Agriculture, Forestry and Fisheries	Yūhei Yamashita	S	19 February 2026	Incumbent	
State Minister of Economy, Trade and Industry	Toshiro Ino	R	19 February 2026	Incumbent	State Minister of Cabinet Office
State Minister of Economy, Trade and Industry	Kenji Yamada	R	19 February 2026	Incumbent	State Minister of Cabinet Office
State Minister of Land, Infrastructure, Transport and Tourism	Hajime Sasaki	R	19 February 2026	Incumbent	
State Minister of Land, Infrastructure, Transport and Tourism	Yasuyuki Sakai	S	19 February 2026	Incumbent	State Minister for Reconstruction; State Minister of Cabinet Office
State Minister of the Environment	Kiyoto Tsuji	R	19 February 2026	Incumbent	State Minister of Cabinet Office
State Minister of the Environment	Shigeharu Aoyama	S	19 February 2026	Incumbent	
State Minister of Defense	Masahisa Miyazaki	R	19 February 2026	Incumbent	State Minister of Cabinet Office

==== Parliamentary Vice-Ministers ====
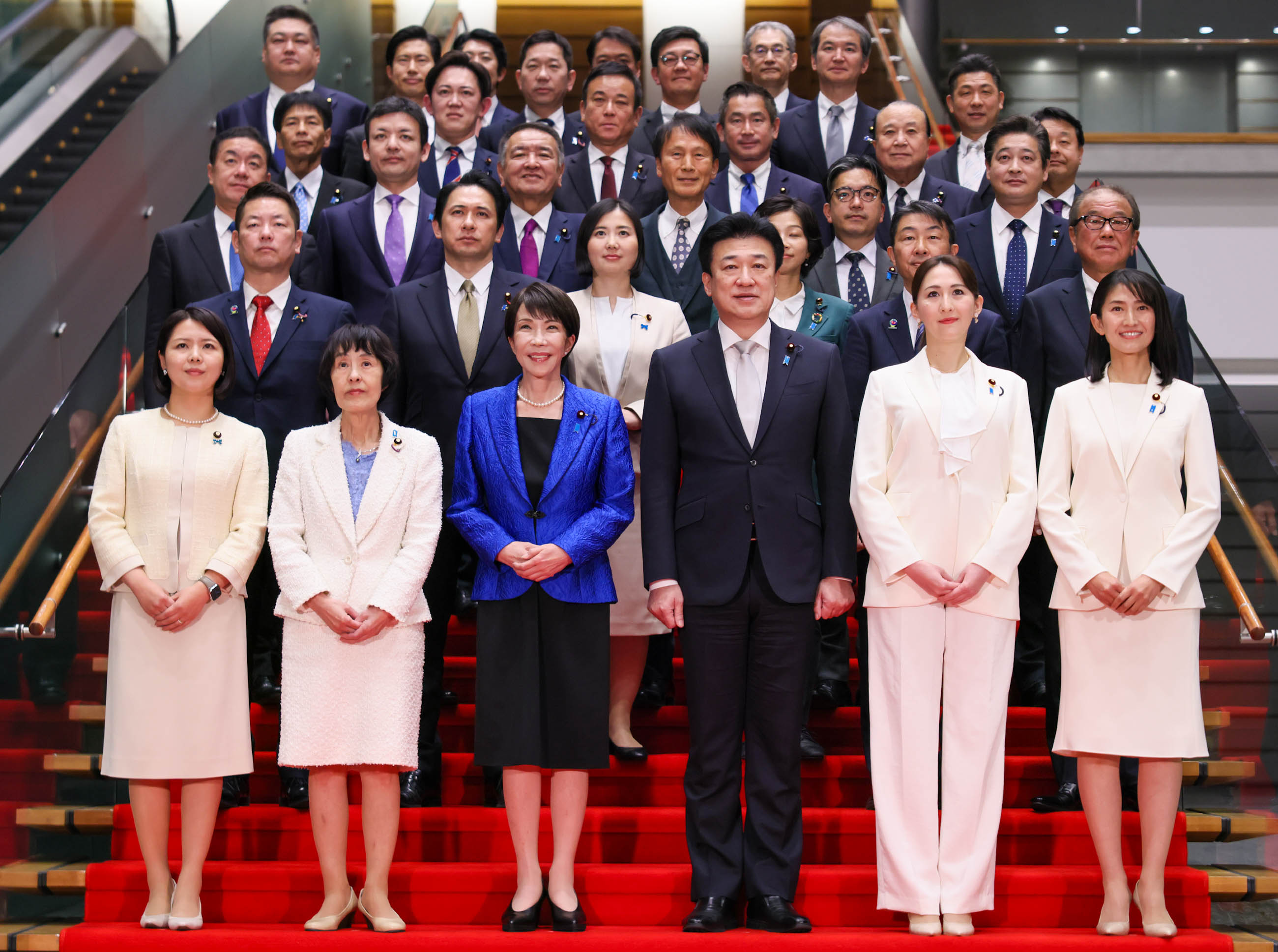
Photo of the parliamentary deputy ministers of the second Takaichi cabinet.

Portfolio	Parliamentary Vice-Minister		Took office	Left office	Concurrent post
Parliamentary Vice-Minister for Digital Transformation	Hideto Kawasaki	R	19 February 2026	Incumbent	Parliamentary Vice-Minister of Cabinet Office
Parliamentary Vice-Minister for Reconstruction	Naoki Furukawa	R	19 February 2026	Incumbent	Parliamentary Vice-Minister of Cabinet Office
Parliamentary Vice-Minister for Reconstruction	Masato Shimizu	S	19 February 2026	Incumbent	Parliamentary Vice-Minister for Education, Culture, Sports, Science and Technology
Parliamentary Vice-Minister for Reconstruction	Takuo Komori	R	19 February 2026	Incumbent	Parliamentary Vice-Minister of Economy, Trade and Industry; Parliamentary Vice-Minister of Cabinet Office
Parliamentary Vice-Minister for Reconstruction	Eishun Ueda	R	19 February 2026	Incumbent	Parliamentary Vice-Minister of Land, Infrastructure, Transport and Tourism; Parliamentary Vice-Minister of Cabinet Office
Parliamentary Vice-Minister of Cabinet Office	Hideto Kawasaki	R	19 February 2026	Incumbent	Parliamentary Vice-Minister for Digital Transformation
Parliamentary Vice-Minister of Cabinet Office	Yozo Kaneko	R	19 February 2026	Incumbent	
Parliamentary Vice-Minister of Cabinet Office	Shinji Wakayama	R	19 February 2026	Incumbent	
Parliamentary Vice-Minister of Cabinet Office	Naoki Furukawa	R	19 February 2026	Incumbent	Parliamentary Vice-Minister for Reconstruction
Parliamentary Vice-Minister of Cabinet Office	Toshiyuki Ochi	S	19 February 2026	Incumbent	Parliamentary Vice-Minister of Economy, Trade and Industry
Parliamentary Vice-Minister of Cabinet Office	Takuo Komori	R	19 February 2026	Incumbent	Parliamentary Vice-Minister of Economy, Trade and Industry; Parliamentary Vice-Minister for Reconstruction
Parliamentary Vice-Minister of Cabinet Office	Eishun Ueda	R	19 February 2026	Incumbent	Parliamentary Vice-Minister of Land, Infrastructure, Transport and Tourism; Parliamentary Vice-Minister for Reconstruction
Parliamentary Vice-Minister of Cabinet Office	Rio Tomonō	S	19 February 2026	Incumbent	Parliamentary Vice-Minister of the Environment
Parliamentary Vice-Minister of Cabinet Office	Shinji Yoshida	R	19 February 2026	Incumbent	Parliamentary Vice-Minister of Defense
Parliamentary Vice-Minister for Internal Affairs and Communications	Hideyuki Nakano	R	19 February 2026	Incumbent	
Parliamentary Vice-Minister for Internal Affairs and Communications	Jun Mukōyama	R	19 February 2026	Incumbent	
Parliamentary Vice-Minister for Internal Affairs and Communications	Daisuke Kajihara	S	19 February 2026	Incumbent	
Parliamentary Vice-Minister of Justice	Mamoru Fukuyama	S	19 February 2026	Incumbent	
Parliamentary Vice-Minister for Foreign Affairs	Arfiya Eri	R	19 February 2026	Incumbent	
Parliamentary Vice-Minister for Foreign Affairs	Yohei Onishi	R	19 February 2026	Incumbent	
Parliamentary Vice-Minister for Foreign Affairs	Tomoaki Shimada	R	19 February 2026	Incumbent	
Parliamentary Vice-Minister of Finance	Satoshi Mitazono	R	19 February 2026	Incumbent	
Parliamentary Vice-Minister of Finance	Harumi Takahashi	S	19 February 2026	Incumbent	
Parliamentary Vice-Minister of Education, Culture, Sports, Science and Technology	Kaoru Fukuda	R	19 February 2026	Incumbent	
Parliamentary Vice-Minister of Education, Culture, Sports, Science and Technology	Masato Shimizu	S	19 February 2026	Incumbent	Parliamentary Vice-Minister for Reconstruction
Parliamentary Vice-Minister of Health, Labour and Welfare	Wataru Kurihara	R	19 February 2026	Incumbent	
Parliamentary Vice-Minister of Health, Labour and Welfare	Masayuki Kamiya	S	19 February 2026	Incumbent	
Parliamentary Vice-Minister for Agriculture, Forestry and Fisheries	Ken Hirose	R	19 February 2026	Incumbent	
Parliamentary Vice-Minister for Agriculture, Forestry and Fisheries	Keisuke Yamamoto	S	19 February 2026	Incumbent	
Parliamentary Vice-Minister of Economy, Trade and Industry	Toshiyuki Ochi	S	19 February 2026	Incumbent	Parliamentary Vice-Minister of Cabinet Office
Parliamentary Vice-Minister of Economy, Trade and Industry	Takuo Komori	R	19 February 2026	Incumbent	Parliamentary Vice-Minister for Reconstruction; Parliamentary Vice-Minister of Cabinet Office
Parliamentary Vice-Minister of Land, Infrastructure, Transport and Tourism	Ryusho Kato	R	19 February 2026	Incumbent	
Parliamentary Vice-Minister of Land, Infrastructure, Transport and Tourism	Manabu Nagai	S	19 February 2026	Incumbent	
Parliamentary Vice-Minister of Land, Infrastructure, Transport and Tourism	Eishun Ueda	R	19 February 2026	Incumbent	Parliamentary Vice-Minister for Reconstruction; Parliamentary Vice-Minister of Cabinet Office
Parliamentary Vice-Minister of the Environment	Chisato Morishita	R	19 February 2026	Incumbent	
Parliamentary Vice-Minister of the Environment	Rio Tomonō	S	19 February 2026	Incumbent	Parliamentary Vice-Minister of Cabinet Office
Parliamentary Vice-Minister of Defense	Shinji Yoshida	R	19 February 2026	Incumbent	Parliamentary Vice-Minister of Cabinet Office
Parliamentary Vice-Minister of Defense	Yohei Wakabayashi	S	19 February 2026	Incumbent	

=== Reshuffled cabinet ===
Second Takaichi Cabinet (Reshuffle)
- 105th Cabinet of Japan

- Reshuffled cabinet photo in September 2026
- Date formed: September 17, 2026

People and organisations
- Emperor: Naruhito
- Prime Minister: Sanae Takaichi
- Member party: Liberal Democratic Party; Japan Innovation Party
- Status in legislature: Coalition government HoR (Lower): Majority; Senate (Upper): Minority
- Opposition party: Democratic Party For the People; Komeito; Constitutional Democratic Party; Sanseitō; Democratic Reform Party; Team Mirai; Japanese Communist Party; Party of Life; Social Democratic Party; Conservative Party of Japan; Centrist Reform Alliance

History
- Elections: 2026/51st HoR general election 2025/27th HoC regular election
- Predecessor: Second Takaichi Cabinet

The reshuffle was the first since the second reshuffle of the Second Kishida cabinet in 2023. Takaichi described it as a cabinet of "decision, challenge and action". Because the Matsu-no-Ma state room of the Tokyo Imperial Palace was closed for LED lighting work in August and September, the attestation ceremony for the new ministers was held in the Take-no-Ma instead, which drew criticism that the Imperial Household Agency had shown insufficient consideration, as cabinet reshuffles are customarily held around September.

Second Takaichi Cabinet as of 15 October 2026
Portfolio	Portrait	Minister		Took office	Left office	Note
Cabinet ministers
Prime Minister		Sanae Takaichi	R	18 February 2026		
Minister for Internal Affairs and Communications		Hisayuki Fujii	R	17 September 2026		First cabinet appointment
Minister of Justice; Minister for Women's Empowerment; Minister in Charge of Verification and Reform of the Legal System		Takashi Yamashita	R	17 September 2026		
Minister for Foreign Affairs		Toshimitsu Motegi	R	18 February 2026		
Minister of Finance: Minister of State for Financial Services; Minister in Charge of Reviewing Subsidies Related to Special Taxation Measures; Minister in Charge of Consumption Tax Support Bill		Satsuki Katayama	S	18 February 2026		
Minister of Education, Culture, Sports, Science and Technology		Yoshihiro Seki	R	17 September 2026		First cabinet appointment
Minister of Health, Labour and Welfare		Kenichiro Ueno	R	18 February 2026		
Minister of Agriculture, Forestry and Fisheries		Kazuo Yana	R	17 September 2026	15 October 2026	First cabinet appointment Resigned
Minister of Agriculture, Forestry and Fisheries		Arata Takebe	R	15 October 2026		First cabinet appointment
Minister of Economy, Trade and Industry; Minister in charge of the Response to the Economic Impact Caused by the Nuclear Accident; Minister in charge of Green Transformation; Minister in charge of Industrial Competitiveness; Minister of State for the Nuclear Damage Compensation and Decommissioning Facilitation Corporation		Ryosei Akazawa	R	18 February 2026		
Minister of Land, Infrastructure, Transport and Tourism; Minister in charge of Water Cycle Policy; Minister in charge of the World Horticultural Exhibition Yokohama 2027		Tatsunori Ibayashi	R	17 September 2026		First cabinet appointment
Minister of the Environment; Minister of State for Nuclear Emergency Preparedness; Minister in Charge of Measures Against Bear-Related Damage		Hiroyoshi Sasagawa	R	17 September 2026		First cabinet appointment
Minister of Defense		Shinjirō Koizumi	R	18 February 2026		
Chief Cabinet Secretary; Minister in charge of Mitigating the Impact of U.S. Forces in Okinawa; Minister in charge of the Abduction Issue		Minoru Kihara	R	18 February 2026		
Minister for Digital Transformation; Minister of State for Ocean Policy; Minister of State for Science and Technology Policy; Minister in charge of Cybersecurity; Minister in State for Cybersecurity; Minister in charge of Content Strategy; Minister of State for Intellectual Property Strategy; Minister of State for Space Policy; Minister of State for AI Strategy		Toshiharu Furukawa	S	17 September 2026		First cabinet appointment
Minister of Reconstruction; Minister of State for Disaster Management; Minister in charge of the Preparation of Establishing the Disaster Management Agency; Minister for National Resilience; Minister for International Disaster Risk Reduction Cooperation		Goshi Hosono	R	17 September 2026		
Chairman of the National Public Safety Commission; Minister of State for Okinawa and Northern Territories Affairs; Minister of State for Consumer Affairs and Food Safety; Minister of State for Ainu-Related Policies		Yasuhiro Hanashi	R	17 September 2026		
Minister of State for Regulatory Reform; Minister of State for Policies Related to Children, Declining Birthrate, Youth Empowerment, and Gender Equality; Minister of State for Promoting Cohesive and Mutual Assistance Society; Minister for Administrative Reform; Minister in charge of national civil service system		Hiroshi Nakatsuka	R	17 September 2026		First cabinet appointment
Minister in Charge of Japan's Growth Strategy; Minister in charge of Wage Increase; Minister in charge of Startups; Minister in charge of Social Security Reform Oriented to All Generations; Minister of State for Economic and Fiscal Policy		Minoru Kiuchi	R	18 February 2026		
Minister in charge of Economic Security; Minister in charge of a Society of Well-Ordered and Harmonious Coexistence with Foreign Nationals; Minister of State for Economic Security; Minister in charge of Infectious Disease Crisis Management		Kimi Onoda	S	18 February 2026		

==== Deputy Chief Cabinet Secretary and Director-General of the Cabinet Legislation Bureau ====
Portfolio	Portrait	Name		Took office	Left office	Previous office
Deputy Chief Cabinet Secretary		Masanao Ozaki	R	18 February 2026		
Deputy Chief Cabinet Secretary		Yūsuke Nakanishi	S	17 September 2026		
Deputy Chief Cabinet Secretary		Yasuhiro Tsuyuki	B	18 February 2026		Commissioner General of the National Police Agency
Director-General of the Cabinet Legislation Bureau		Nobuyuki Iwao	B	18 February 2026		Public Prosecutors Office

==== Special Advisor to the Prime Minister ====
Portfolio	Adviser		Term	Note
Special Advisor to the Prime Minister	Kenji Wakamiya	R	17 September 2026–present	
Special Advisor to the Prime Minister	Hajime Sasaki	R	17 September 2026–present	
Special Advisor to the Prime Minister	Takashi Endo	R	18 February 2026–present	
Special Advisor to the Prime Minister	Hisashi Matsumoto	R	17 September 2026–present	
Special Advisor to the Prime Minister	Yoshimasa Uno	B	18 February 2026–present	

==== Characteristics ====
- Ministers were selected on the basis of ability using questionnaires, departing from the practice of giving weight to recommendations from the former LDP factions.
- For the first time since the 2023–2024 Japanese slush fund scandal, lawmakers involved in the scandal were appointed as Cabinet ministers. Ten lawmakers involved in the scandal were appointed as State Ministers or Parliamentary Vice-Ministers.
- Hiroshi Nakatsuka of the Japan Innovation Party joined the Cabinet, and five other JIP members were appointed as State Ministers or Parliamentary Vice-Ministers.
- Goshi Hosono, who served as Minister of the Environment and in other posts under the Democratic Party of Japan government, was appointed.

==== Changes ====
On 14 October 2026, Minister of Agriculture, Forestry and Fisheries Kazuo Yana submitted his resignation to Takaichi, which was accepted. Yana had faced criticism after reports that, before joining the Cabinet, he had said at a party gathering that road budgets for municipalities that had backed his opponent in the February 2026 general election had been "drastically cut"; he retracted the remark and apologised, while denying that he had pressed for any cuts. He also acknowledged that supporters had been transported free of charge by bus to his campaign launch rally during a past election, which was raised as a possible violation of the Public Offices Election Act, though he denied any illegality. The resignation was regarded as a de facto dismissal and was the first resignation of a Cabinet minister since the Takaichi government was formed. On 15 October, Arata Takebe, a former State Minister of Agriculture, Forestry and Fisheries representing the Hokkaido 12th district, was appointed as his successor after an attestation ceremony at the Imperial Palace.

==== Opinion polls ====
In a nationwide telephone poll conducted by The Asahi Shimbun on 26–27 September, opinion of the reshuffle was divided, with 35% approving and 40% disapproving. Cabinet approval stood at 51% (down from 53% in August) and disapproval at 33%. 68% considered the appointment of lawmakers involved in the slush fund scandal to be a problem, while 30% did not.

In an emergency poll by The Yomiuri Shimbun on 17–18 September, 52% approved of the cabinet reshuffle and the LDP executive appointments as a whole, against 34% who did not. 59% approved of the appointment of a minister from the Japan Innovation Party, which had previously cooperated with the government from outside the Cabinet, while 29% did not. Cabinet approval rose by three points to 59%, the first rise in approval following a reshuffle since Shinzo Abe's reshuffle of August 2017.

In a poll by the All-Nippon News Network (ANN) on 19–20 September, 42% approved of the reshuffle and the LDP executive appointments, while 37% did not. Cabinet approval was 58.3%, up 2.9 points from the previous month. 56% considered the appointment as ministers of lawmakers with unreported political funds, the first since the slush fund scandal, to be a problem, while 34% did not.

Preceded by First Takaichi Cabinet	Cabinet of Japan; 2026–present	Incumbent
