= Takaichi cabinet =

Takaichi cabinet may refer to:

- First Takaichi cabinet
- Second Takaichi cabinet
