= Hisayuki Fujii =

Japanese politician (born 1971)

- 藤井 比早之
- Official portrait, 2024

Minister for Internal Affairs and Communications
- Incumbent
- Assumed office 17 September 2026
- Prime Minister: Sanae Takaichi
- Preceded by: Yoshimasa Hayashi

Member of the House of Representatives
- Incumbent
- Assumed office 18 December 2012
- Preceded by: Shōichi Takahashi
- Constituency: Hyōgo 4th

Personal details
- Born: 11 September 1971 (age 55) Nishiwaki, Hyōgo, Japan
- Party: Liberal Democratic
- Education: University of Tokyo

Hisayuki Fujii (藤井比早之, Fujii Hisayuki; born 11 September 1971) is a Japanese politician serving as a member of the House of Representatives since 2012. He served as deputy minister of foreign affairs under Shigeru Ishiba between 2024 and 2025.
