= Personal Information Protection Commission (Japan) =

The Personal Information Protection Commission (個人情報保護委員会, Kojin jōhō hogo iinkai; PPC) is a Japanese government commission charged with the protection of personal information. It was established on January 1, 2016 to replace the Specific Personal Information Protection Commission. The commission consisted of eight commissioners and a chairperson appointed by the Prime Minister with the consent of the National Diet. The number of commission members was increased from the initial four to eight in February 2016.

The Commission is responsible for supervision under the Act on the Protection of Personal Information. An amendment act to that Act was approved by the Diet on 5 June 2020 and promulgated on 12 June 2020, to come into force, except for certain provisions, within two years of promulgation. All of the amending acts had entered into full force by 1 April 2023. The Commission has also issued supplementary rules governing the handling of personal data transferred from the European Union and the United Kingdom under an adequacy decision.
