= Water cycle management =

The water cycle including human activities.

Water cycle management is a multidisciplinary approach relating to all planning, developmental, operational and tactical decisions to influence the water cycle. Most importantly water cycle management is used to ensure availability of clean water for designated use, and to ensure safe release of treated water back to nature. In undisturbed environment water is in a natural cycle and it is generally usable for most of nature as it is in each stage of the cycle. After human interaction the natural cycle is disturbed. Runoff on urban agricultural areas collect some objects, particles and substances that may not be purified from water through natural purifying methods. Additionally, “used water” from households and industry can be extremely harmful for nature, if not treated properly.

Water cycle management is used in different branches of environmental sciences and engineering to satisfy human and environmental objectives. Generally, water cycle management can be divided into six subsets that approach the issue from varying perspectives: Meteorology, Hydrology, Water resource management, Water Engineering, Water conservation and Environmental monitoring. Recently, politics and socio-economic aspects are also considered in water cycle management due to inequal distribution of quantity and quality of freshwater worldwide.

== Meteorology and Hydrology ==
The study of meteorology focuses on the forecasting of the weather, while the study of hydrology focuses on the movement, distribution and management of water. The study of hydrology and meteorology come together in a branch called hydrometeorology. The core focus of hydrometeorology is on the transfer of water and energy between the land surface and the lower atmosphere. By using a mathematical model, a rain forecast by a meteorologist can be used by a hydrologist to calculate the specific impact that rain could have on a certain area. The outputs of these models can be used to deal with and mitigate the effects of precipitation events on the water cycle management.

== Water resource management ==
Water resource management is a subset of water cycle management that focuses on utilization of fresh water resources. Fresh water is a limited resource and it is unevenly distributed globally and even locally, and it is consumed by people, industry, agriculture and nature alike. Successful management of fresh water resources requires extensive knowledge on demand, resources and capacity, available technology, hydrometeorology and political factors. Recently, an Integrated Water Resource Management (IWRM) was used to integrate all these fields into one body since these issues could no longer be solved solely by water professionals or water ministries. Furthermore, some major challenges are caused by global warming. It causes increasing uncertainties to distribution, quality and quantity of fresh water which then may cause further socio-economic issues. To overcome this, in future, water resource management should transition from the current “prediction and control” methods to a “learning approach”.

== Water engineering ==
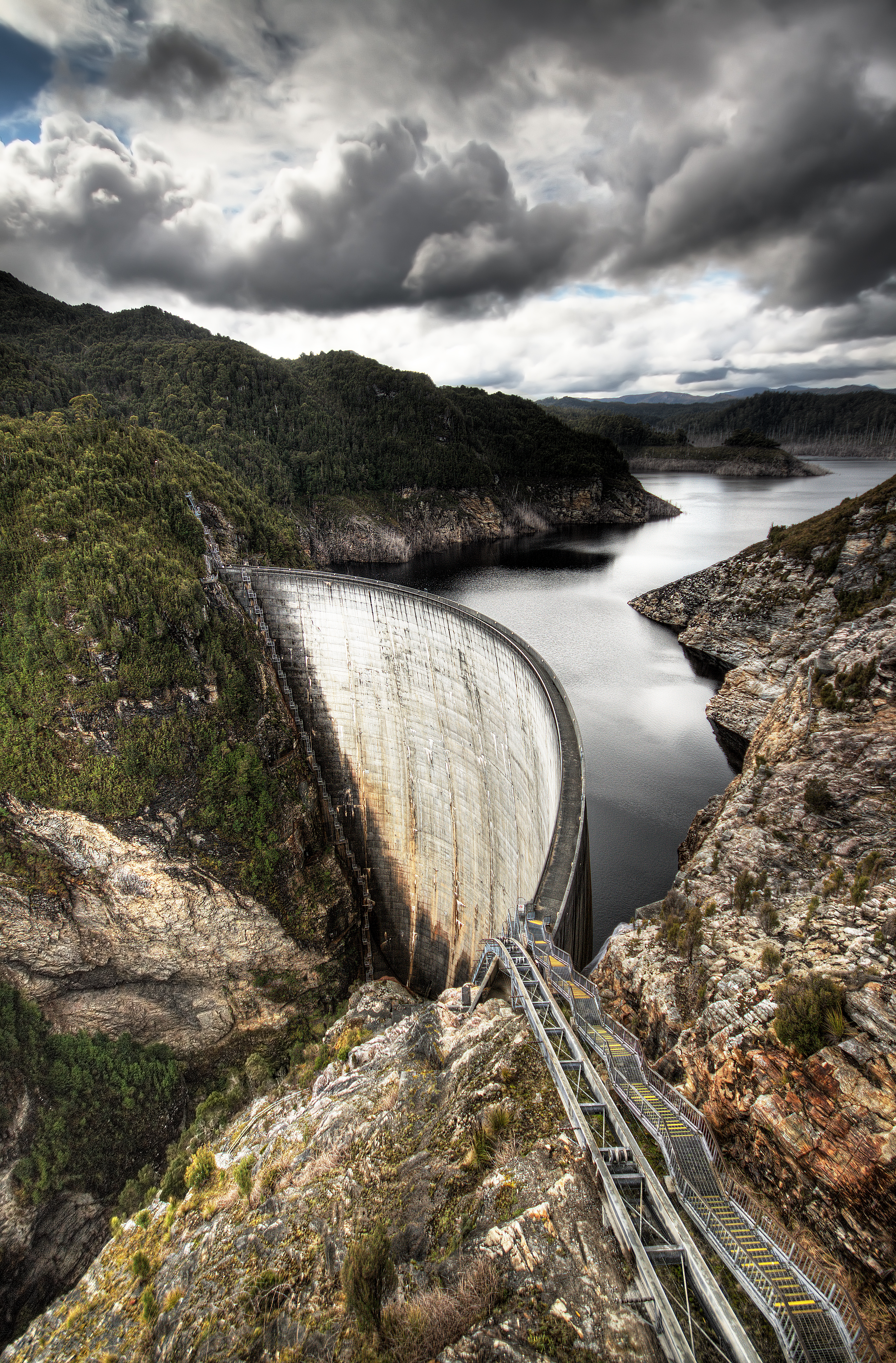
Gordon Dam, Tasmania, Australia. Dams are a part of static structural water engineering.

Water engineering is an important discipline that aims to provide clean water and water safety, and it can be applied to every stage of the water cycle. Water engineering can be divided into further sub-sets: structural water engineering, water treatment and sewage treatment. Structural water engineering involves building, repairing and maintaining structures that control water resources. In terms of water cycle management most important ones are reservoirs, dams, sewerage and pumping stations. All these are important aspects of natural occurrence of water.

In terms of water cycle management re-use treatments are more important than static structures like dams. Water treatment is any process that is used to remove contaminants from water and to improve the quality of water. Treated water can be allocated as drinking water for households, supply for industrial or agricultural use and the treatment method depends on the purpose of the end-use. Also, water treatment is used to safely return water to the environment. Sewage treatment is conceptually rather similar to water management, but it handles wastewater that is affected by human use: sewage from households and industrial wastewaters. The goal of sewage treatment is to clean wastewater of contaminants and make the water available for re-use in the water cycle. Sewage is treated with several methods including chemical treatment, use of bacteria, biological processes and UV disinfection methods. Still, after extensive treatment methods significant amounts of harmful substances, such as pharmaceuticals, are observed to return environment and water cycle.

== Water conservation ==
The increasing population demands a sustainably managed hydrosphere. There is a demand for freshwater which needs to be satisfied, in the present and in the future. A big factor in this increasing demand is the climate change. By utilizing water conservation management policies, countries can ensure the availability of water for future generations, cut down on energy use, conserve freshwater habitat for local wildlife and migrating birds and ensure water quality for its inhabitants.

The key activities around water conservation are; the reduction of water loss, use and waste of water resources, avoiding the decline of water quality and improving management practices that reduce the use of water.

== Environmental monitoring ==
To ensure the water cycle management disciplines are satisfactory and improve the water cycle, environmental monitoring should be used to provide information and trends on the impact of the policies which are adopted in the water cycle management on ecosystems and sensitive biota; for example, monitoring the effects of reduced water flows on salmon spawning and recruitment.
