= Outbreak response =

Measures to reduce the spread of an infectious disease

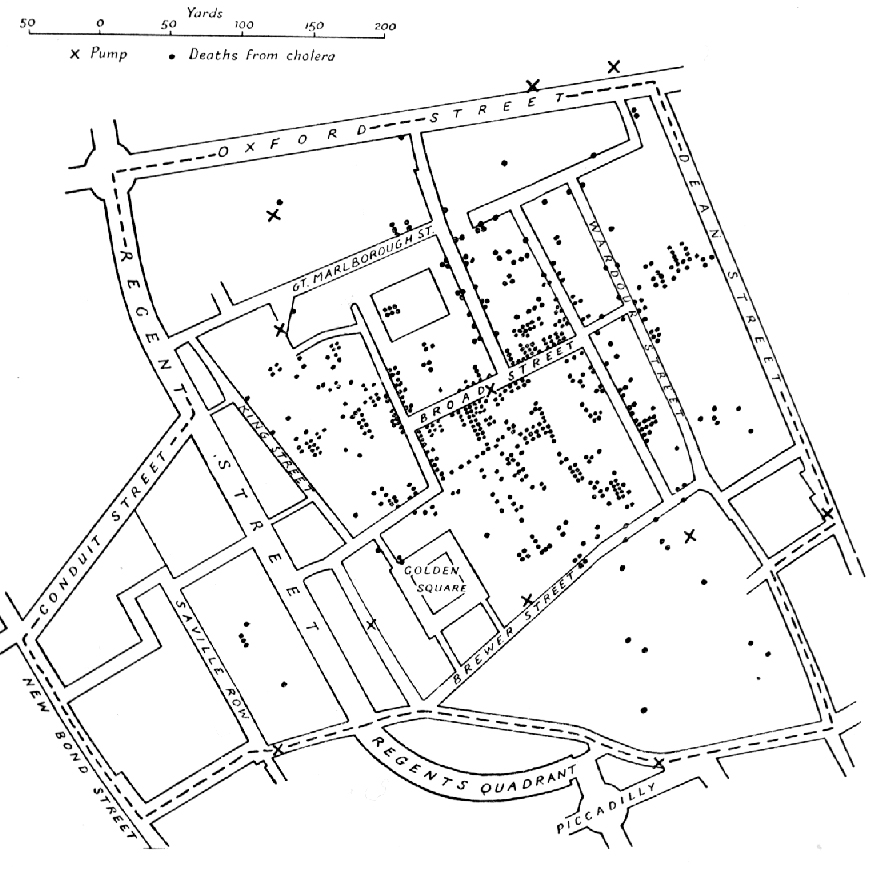
- John Snow was the first to map clusters of cholera during the 1854 Broad Street cholera outbreak in London. This event is widely considered the birth of modern epidemiology and lead to appropriate sanitary measures which put a stop to the outbreak.
- Other names: Epidemic response, epidemic control, pandemic response
- Specialty: Public health, epidemiology, disease controlclinical epidemiology, infectious diseases

Outbreak response or outbreak control measures are acts which attempt to minimize the spread of or effects of a disease outbreak. Outbreak response includes aspects of general disease control such as maintaining adequate hygiene, but may also include responses that extend beyond traditional healthcare settings and are unique to an outbreak, such as physical distancing, contact tracing, mapping of disease clusters, or quarantine. Some measures such as isolation are also useful in preventing an outbreak from occurring in the first place.

Epidemic response or pandemic response is when outbreak response are used within a disease outbreak that has been classified as an epidemic or pandemic.

Outbreak response is normally conducted by teams, which include infection control physicians, epidemiologists, infectious disease specialists and a number of other specialties. Mathematics and mathematicians are often involved in constructing models of disease spread.

== Strategies ==
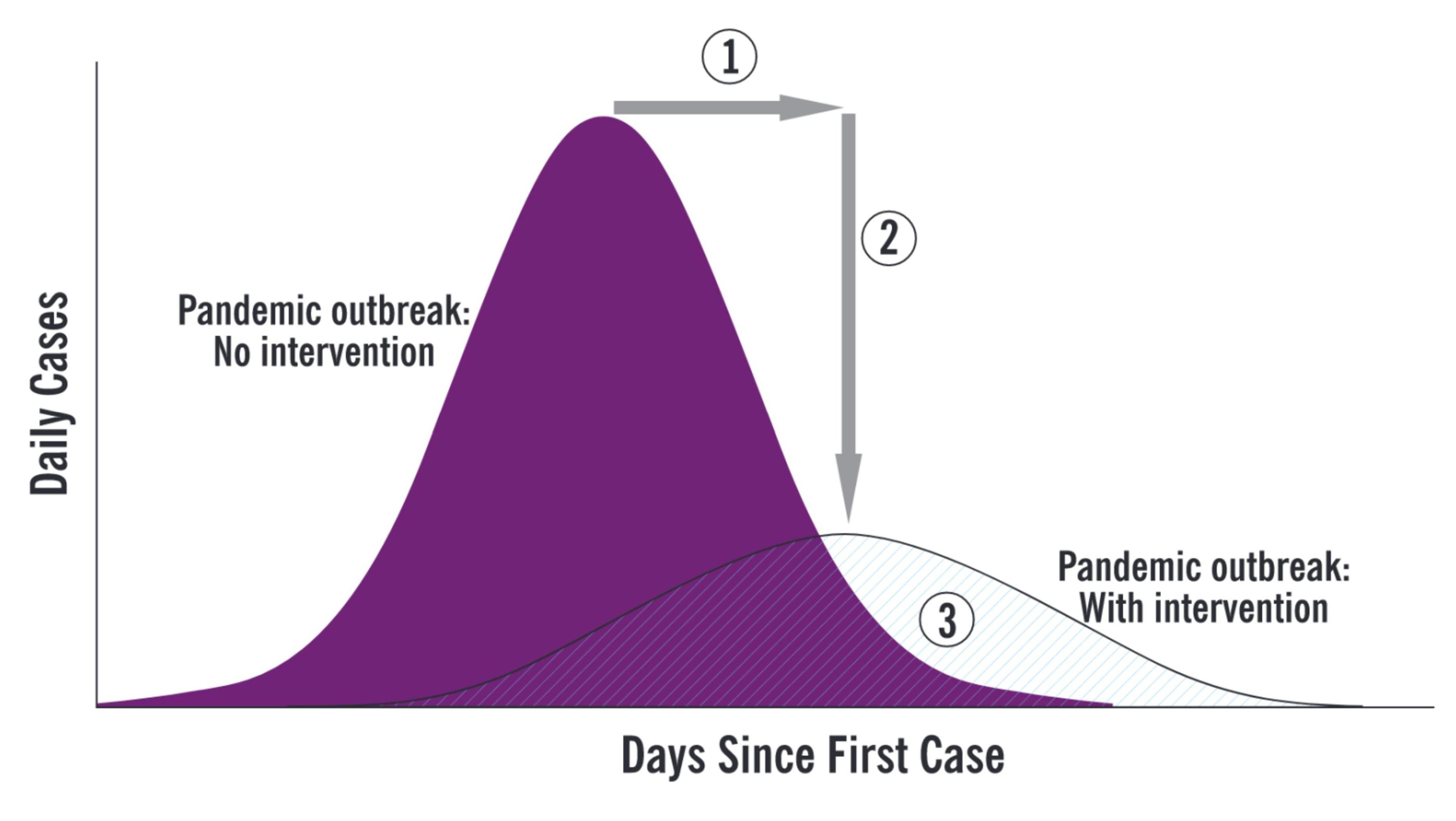
The goals of community mitigation: (1) delay outbreak peak; (2) decompress peak burden on healthcare, known as flattening the curve; and (3) diminish overall cases and health impact.

The basic strategies in the control of an outbreak are containment and mitigation. Containment may be undertaken in the early stages of the outbreak, including contact tracing and isolating infected individuals to stop the disease from being spread to the rest of the population, other public health interventions on infection control, and therapeutic countermeasures such as vaccinations which may be effective if available. When it becomes apparent that it is no longer possible to contain the spread of the disease, it will then move on to the mitigation stage, when measures are taken to slow the spread of disease and mitigate its effects on the health care system and society. In reality, a combination of both containment and mitigation measures may be undertaken at the same time to control an outbreak.

A key part of managing an infectious disease outbreak is trying to decrease the epidemic peak, known as flattening the epidemic curve. This helps decrease the risk of health services being overwhelmed and providing more time for a vaccine and treatment to be developed. Non-pharmaceutical interventions may be taken to manage the outbreak; for example in a flu pandemic, these actions may include personal preventive measures such as hand hygiene, wearing face-masks and self-quarantine; community measures aimed at social distancing such as closing schools and cancelling mass gathering events; community engagement to encourage acceptance and participation in such interventions; as well as environmental measures such as cleaning of surfaces.

Another strategy, suppression, requires more extreme long-term non-pharmaceutical interventions so as to reverse the pandemic by reducing the basic reproduction number to less than 1. The suppression strategy, which include stringent population-wide social distancing, home isolation of cases and household quarantine, was undertaken by China during the COVID-19 pandemic where entire cities were placed under lockdown, but such strategy carries with it considerable social and economic costs.

== See also ==
- Mathematical modelling of infectious disease
