= Satsuki Katayama =

Japanese politician (born 1959)

- 片山 さつき
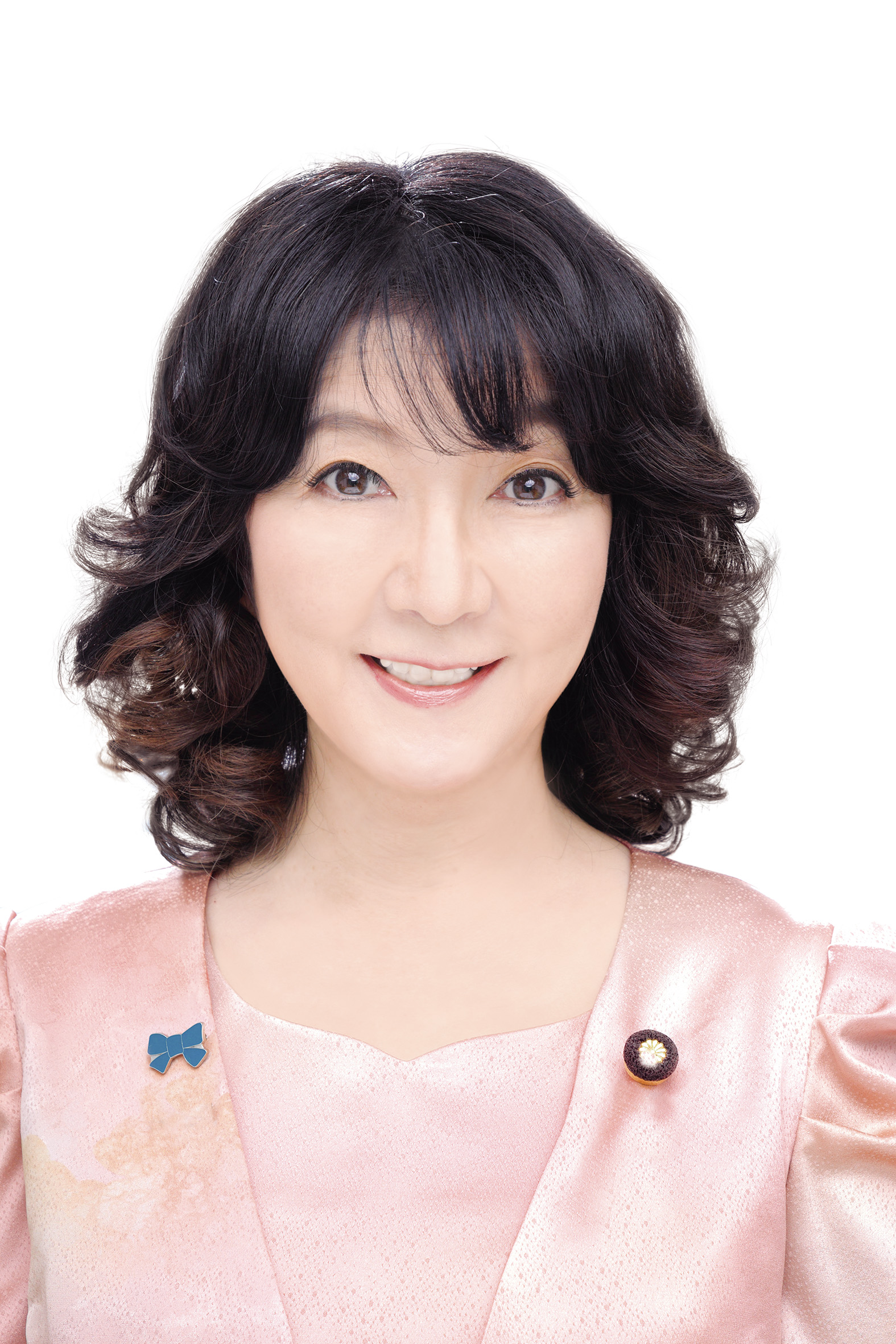
- Official portrait, 2022

Minister of Finance
- Incumbent
- Assumed office 21 October 2025
- Prime Minister: Sanae Takaichi
- Preceded by: Katsunobu Katō

Minister for Regional Revitalization Minister for Gender Equality
- In office 2 October 2018 – 11 September 2019
- Prime Minister: Shinzo Abe
- Preceded by: Hiroshi Kajiyama (Regional Revitalization); Seiko Noda (Gender Equality)
- Succeeded by: Seigo Kitamura (Regional Revitalization); Seiko Hashimoto (Gender Equality)

Member of the House of Councillors
- Incumbent
- Assumed office 26 July 2010
- Constituency: National PR

Member of the House of Representatives
- In office 13 September 2005 – 21 July 2009
- Preceded by: Minoru Kiuchi
- Succeeded by: Minoru Kiuchi
- Constituency: Shizuoka 7th

Personal details
- Born: Satsuki Tomonaga; 9 May 1959 (age 67) Urawa, Saitama, Japan
- Party: Liberal Democratic
- Spouse(s): Yōichi Masuzoe (m. 1986; div. 1989) Ryutaro Katayama (m. 1990)
- Parent: Yasuo Tomonaga (father)
- Relatives: Tsunao Ginrin (great-grandfather); Yutaka Katayama (father-in-law)
- Education: University of Tokyo; École nationale d'administration

Satsuki Katayama (née Tomonaga; 9 May 1959) is a Japanese politician serving in Japan's House of Councillors, having been elected in July 2010 as a candidate for the Liberal Democratic Party (LDP). She previously represented the Shizuoka 7th district in the House of Representatives for one term from 2005 until 2009. She has served as the first woman Minister of Finance since 21 October 2025 in the first and second Takaichi cabinet.

== Early life and career ==
Katayama was born in Urawa, Saitama Prefecture (later Urawa-ku, Saitama). She studied law at the University of Tokyo, where she was chosen Miss Tokyo University (Miss Tōdai).

After graduation in 1982, Katayama joined the Ministry of Finance. During her time at the Ministry, Satsuki Katayama attended and graduated from École nationale d'administration in France. She served in the ministry for more than twenty years and was the first woman to become a budget examiner in the Budget Bureau.

== Political career ==
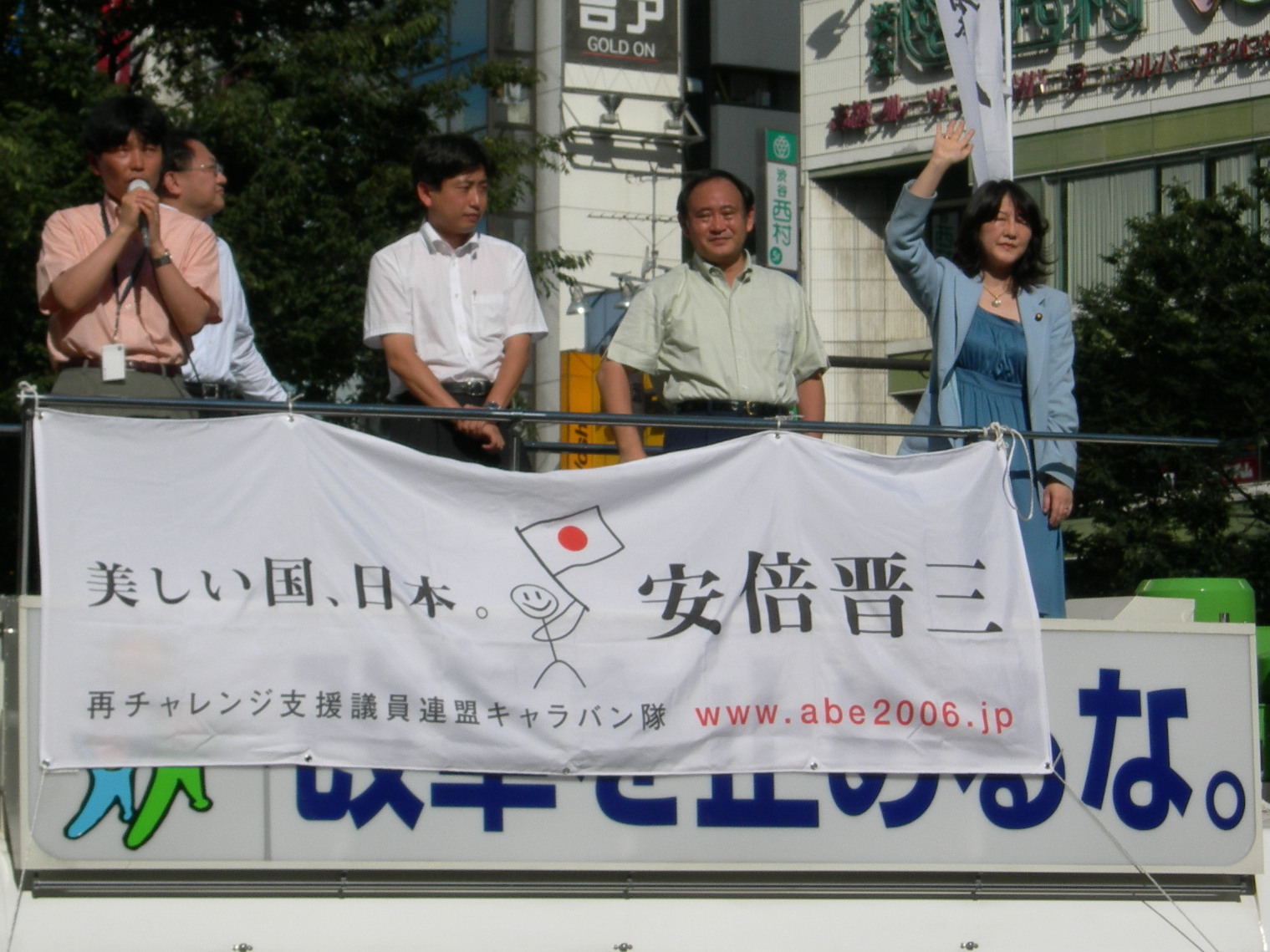
Katayama with Ichita Yamamoto and Yoshihide Suga in Shibuya, Tokyo (September 19, 2006)

She was elected to the House of Representatives for the first time in the 2005 general election and served as Parliamentary Vice Minister of Economy, Trade and Industry. She was one of 83 so-called "Koizumi Children," LDP candidates elected for the first time amid the widespread popularity of reformist prime minister Junichiro Koizumi; Koizumi touted Katayama as a "madonna of reform."

Katayama and 72 other "Koizumi Children" were defeated in the 2009 general election, in which the Democratic Party of Japan routed the LDP. She later characterized herself as a "war-displaced orphan" in 2011.

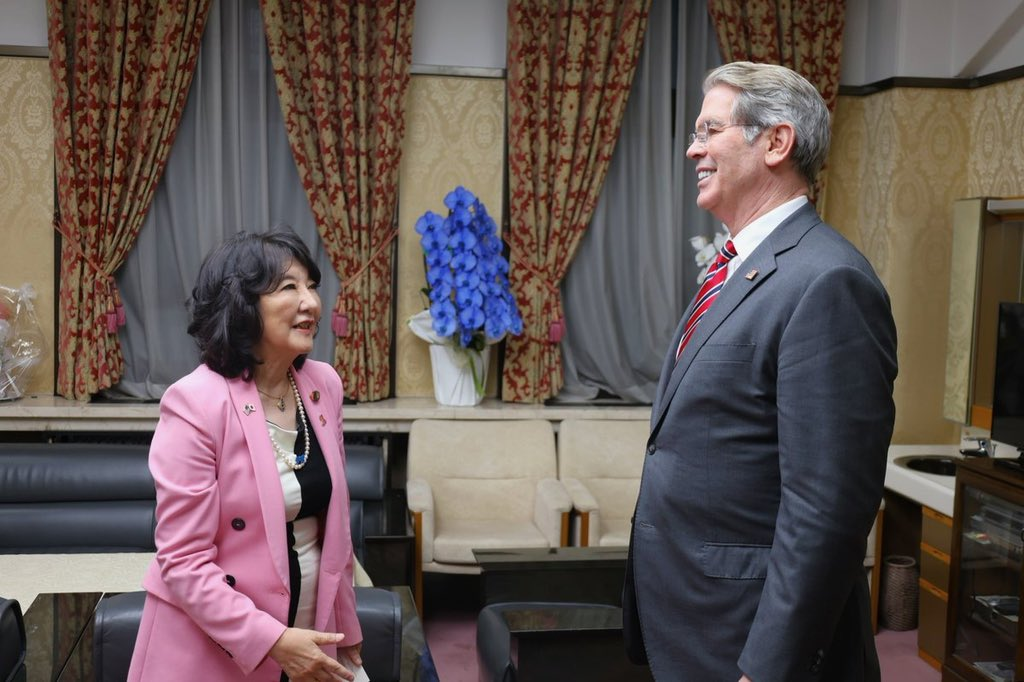
Katayama meeting U.S. Treasury Secretary Scott Bessent in October 2025

On 1 May 2019, she attended the presentation of the Three Sacred Treasures to Emperor Naruhito. In the last such ceremony in 1989, only males were allowed to be in attendance; however in 2019 all cabinet members were allowed to attend regardless of sex, although only male adults from the imperial family could attend. In October 2025, Katayama was selected as Japan’s first female Minister of Finance, in the new Sanae Takaichi administration.

Katayama, like many of her LDP colleagues, is affiliated with the ultra-conservative Nippon Kaigi.

== Personal life ==
She married international politics professor Yōichi Masuzoe in 1986 while working at the MoF. They separated after several months, divorced in 1989 and are both remarried. Masuzoe later became a prominent media personality and member of the House of Councillors, and both Masuzoe and Katayama were considered by the LDP as candidates for the 2014 gubernatorial election in Tokyo. Prime Minister of Japan Shinzō Abe, who led the LDP to endorse Masuzoe in his successful election, said that he wanted Katayama more than anyone else to stand in support of Masuzoe, but Katayama responded that it was difficult for her to do so given Masuzoe's publicized dispute over support payments to one of his extramarital children, who is disabled. Katayama and Masuzoe both studied at ENA, France.

In 1990, she married Ryutaro Katayama, a Japanese businessman who is an alumnus of Harvard Business School.

== Election history ==
Election	Age	District	Political party	Number of votes	election results
2005 Japanese general election	46	Shizuoka 7th district	LDP	85,168	Won
2009 Japanese general election	50	Shizuoka 7th district	LDP	54,128	lost
2010 Japanese House of Councillors election	51	National PR	LDP	299,036	Won
2016 Japanese House of Councillors election	57	National PR	LDP	393,382	Won
2022 Japanese House of Councillors election	63	National PR	LDP	298,062	Won

Political offices
Preceded by Hiroshi Kajiyama	Minister of State for Regional Revitalisation; 2018–2019	Succeeded by Seigo Kitamura
Preceded by Hiroshi Kajiyama	Minister of State for Regulatory Reform; 2018–2019	Succeeded by Seigo Kitamura
Preceded by Seiko Noda	Minister of State for Gender Equality; 2018–2019	Succeeded by Seiko Hashimoto
Preceded by Katsunobu Katō	Minister of Finance; 2025–present	Incumbent
