= Deputy Minister (Japan) =

In Japan, a Deputy Minister (Japanese: 副大臣, romanized: Fuku daijin) works in the Cabinet of Japan to assist senior ministers. The English name was given different translations by each ministry and agency such as Senior Vice-Minister, Parliamentary Senior Vice-Minister, State Minister, or State Secretary, but has been made consistent with the official term State Minister.

== List ==
The fixed number is 26 people in total. The total number of deputy ministers, digital deputy ministers, and reconstruction deputy ministers may exceed this number because they can also serve as other deputy ministers.

- Deputy Minister of the Cabinet Office (3 people)
- Deputy Minister of Digital (1 person)
- Deputy Minister for Reconstruction (2 people)
- Deputy Minister of Internal Affairs and Communications (2 people)
- Deputy Minister of Justice (1 person)
- Deputy Foreign Minister (2 people)
- Deputy Minister of Finance (2 people)
- Deputy Minister of Education, Culture, Sports, Science and Technology (2 people)
- Deputy Minister of Health, Labour and Welfare (2 people)
- Deputy Minister of Agriculture, Forestry and Fisheries (2 people)
- Deputy Minister of Economy, Trade and Industry (2 people)
- Deputy Minister of Land, Infrastructure, Transport and Tourism (2 people)
- Deputy Minister of the Environment (2 people)
- Deputy Minister of Defence (1 person)
