= Kagoshima Prefectural Konan High School =

Coordinates: 31°34′46″N 130°32′46.4″E

Kagoshima Prefectural Konan Senior High School
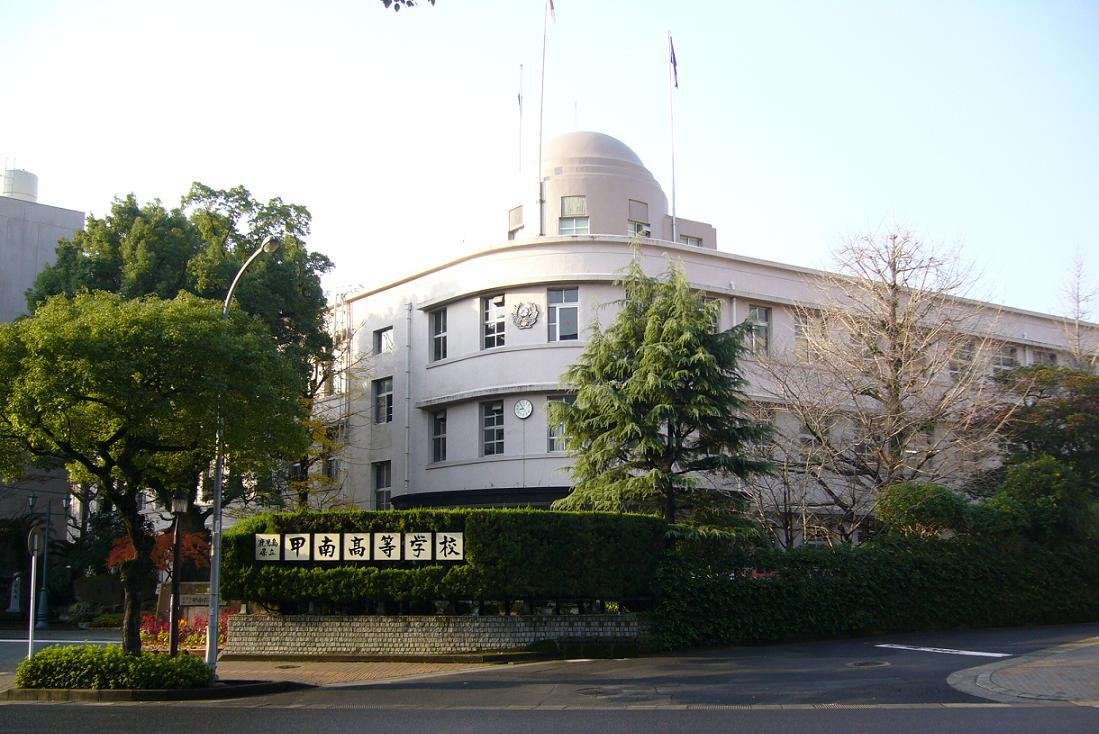
- Kagoshima, Kagoshima; Japan

Information
- Type: Public senior high school, co-educational
- Established: 1906(Daini-Kagoshima Middle School under the old system of education), 1948(Konan High School)
- Grades: 1–3
- Website: Kagoshima Prefectural Konan Senior High School official website

Kagoshima Prefectural Konan Senior High School (鹿児島県立甲南高等学校, Kagoshima Kenritsu Kōnan Kōtō-gakkō) is an upper secondary school in Kagoshima City, Kagoshima Prefecture, Japan. It is a co-educational public school.

== Overview ==
Before the school system was reformed after World War II, this school used to be known as Kagoshima Prefectural Daini-Kagoshima Middle School (鹿児島県立第二鹿児島中学校, Kagoshima Kenritsu Daini Kagoshima Chūgakkō) and Kagoshima Prefectural Daini Girls' High School (鹿児島県立第二高等女学校, Kagoshima Kenritsu Daini Kōtōjogakkō). (Note: Under the old system of education in Japan, Middle School had a five-year course for boys aged 12 and over, and Girls' High School had a four or five-year course for girls at the same age. Some five-year course's students go on to the schools of higher education when they finish the fourth grade. Due to World War II, the five-year course was sometimes shortened to four years.) The two schools became Kagoshima Prefectural Konan High School in 1949. The official founding year is 1906 when Daini-Kagoshima Middle School was founded. However, Daini-Kagoshima Middle School is regarded as one of the successors of Middle School Zoshikan (中学造士館, Chūgaku Zōshikan) in Meiji era, which originated from the han school called Zoshikan (造士館, Zōshikan) in Edo period.

The school's main building with the dome was built in 1930 (early Showa era) as the Daini-Kagoshima Middle School's building. The school is located on the south (南) side of the Kotsuki River (甲突川, Kōtsukigawa). In addition, there are birthplaces of Ōkubo Toshimichi, also called Ōkubo Kōtō (大久保甲東), and Saigō Takamori, also called Saigō Nanshū (西郷南洲), near the school. The school was named Kōnan (甲南) for these reasons.

The ivy and the camphor tree in the schoolyard are the school symbols. The school emblem features deer antlers and a flower of dianthus. Kagoshima Prefectural Tsurumaru High School is the rival school.

As of 2022, this school has full-day General Course (全日制普通科) which is three-year course.

== Notable alumni ==
Politics

- Chieko Nōno – member of the National Diet, Minister of Justice, Minister of State for Youth Affairs and Measures for Declining Birthrate
- Osanori Koyama (Note: alumni of Daini-Kagoshima Middle School) – member of the National Diet, Minister of Construction, Minister of State for Director General of Environment Agency
- Moichi Miyazaki – member of the National Diet, Minister of State for Director General of the Science and Technology Agency
- Tadahiko Shimadzu – member of the National Diet
- Toshifumi Kosehira – member of the National Diet
- Otohiko Ichiki (Note: alumni of predecessors before 1906) - member of the National Diet, Minister of Finance, the 10th Governor of the Bank of Japan, the mayor of Tokyo City, bureaucrat (Vice-Minister of Finance)

Academic

- Akira Arimura – neuroscientist, biochemist, Professor Emeritus at Tulane University in America
- Isamu Akasaki – engineer and physicist, inventor of the bright gallium nitride (GaN) p-n junction blue LED, Nobel Prize in Physics, Charles Stark Draper Prize, Queen Elizabeth Prize for Engineering, IEEE Edison Medal, Kyoto Prize, Japan Academy Prize & Imperial Prize of the Japan Academy, Person of Cultural Merit, Order of Culture, Professor Emeritus at Nagoya University, Distinguished Professor at Meijo University
- Kikuo Arakawa – medical scientist, cardiovascular scientist, internist, World Hypertension League Award, International Society of Hypertension Distinguished Fellow Award, Professor Emeritus at Fukuoka University, the 12th President of the International Society of Hypertension
- Kimito Funatsu – chemist of chemoinformatics, Herman Skolnik Award, Professor Emeritus at University of Tokyo
- Kunio Shiota – life scientist, biochemist, Professor Emeritus at University of Tokyo
- Hideki Sakurai – organic chemist, Japan Academy Prize & Imperial Prize of the Japan Academy, Professor Emeritus at Tohoku University, The President of the Chemical Society of Japan
- Akitsune Imamura – seismologist

Culture

- Katsusuke Miyauchi – author of fiction and essays, Geijutsu Senshō Prize, Yomiuri Prize for Literature
- Taro Yashima – artist and author of picture books in America, the Caldecott Honor
- Shinobu Kaitani – manga artist
- Iemasa Kayumi – voice actor, actor
- Toshiaki Megumi – comedian, actor, television presenter
- Seishirō Nishida – actor
- Takeji Fujishima – yōga painter, Order of Culture
- Goyō Hashiguchi – print artist, book designer
- Satoru Nishizono – anime and tokusatsu screenwriters

Sports

- Jun'ichi Miyashita – swimmer, Olympics bronze medalist
- Sanpō Toku – judo player

== Surrounding area ==
Southern

- Kagoshima University
- Kagoshima City Transportation Bureau
- Kagoshima City Hospital

Northern

- Museum of the Meiji Restoration
- Kagoshima-Chuo High School
- Kagoshima Women's College

Eastern

- Nichū-dōri Station
- Arata Hachimangū(a shinto shrine)

Western

- Kagoshima-Chūō Station
- Amu Plaza Kagoshima and Amuran Ferris wheel
