= Tsurumaru High School =

Coordinates: 31°35′23.8″N 130°32′17.2″E

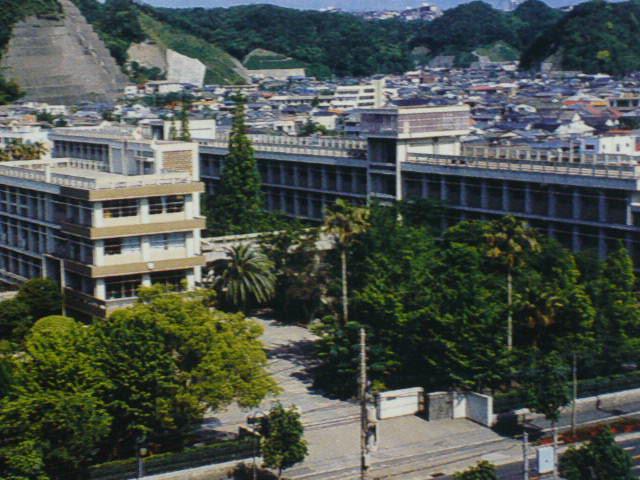
- Kagoshima; Japan

Information
- Type: Public senior high school, co-educational
- Established: 1894(Middle School under the old system of education), 1949(Tsurumaru High School)
- Grades: 1–3
- Website: Kagoshima Prefectural Tsurumaru High School

Kagoshima Prefectural Tsurumaru Senior High School (鹿児島県立鶴丸高等学校, Kagoshima Kenritsu Tsurumaru Kōtō Gakkō) is an upper secondary school in Kagoshima City, Kagoshima Prefecture, Japan. It is a co-educational public school.

== Overview ==
Before the school system was reformed after World War II, this school used to be known as Kagoshima Prefectural Daiichi-Kagoshima Middle School (鹿児島県立第一鹿児島中学校, Kagoshima Kenritsu Daiichi Kagoshima Chūgakkō) and Kagoshima Prefectural Daiichi Girls’ High School (鹿児島県立第一高等女学校, Kagoshima Kenritsu Daiichi Kōtōjogakkō). (Note: Under the old system of education in Japan, Middle School had a five-year course for boys aged 12 and over, and Girls' High School had a four or five-year course for girls at the same age. Some five-year course's students go on to the schools of higher education when they finish the fourth grade. Due to World War II, the five-year course was sometimes shortened to four years.) Those schools became Tsurumaru High School in 1949. Daiichi-Kagoshima Middle School was established in 1894 as 鹿児島県尋常中学校 (Kagoshima Ken Jinjō-Chūgakkō) and the year is Tsurumaru's founding year.

This high school's name is derived from Kagoshima Castle also called Tsurumaru Castle. After World War II, the Seventh Higher School Zoshikan (第七高等学校造士館, Daishichi Kōtō Gakkō Zōshikan) on the former site of Tsurumaru Castle was closed because of the educational reform in occupied Japan. (Note: The Seventh Higher School was absorbed into Kagoshima University under the new educational system.) People named the successor of Daiichi-Kagoshima Middle School "Tsurumaru" after the site of the Seventh Higher School because they missed it. The school emblem features a crane spreading its wings because Tsuru (鶴) means a crane in Japanese.

Kagoshima Prefectural Konan High School is the rival school.

== Notable alumni ==
Politics and Government

- Shigenori Tōgō - diplomat, Minister of Foreign Affairs, Minister of Colonial Affairs
- Kokichi Shimoinaba - Superintendent General of Japanese police, member of the National Diet, Minister of Justice
- Hiroko Ōta - economist, Minister of State for Economic and Fiscal Policy
- Minoru Yanagida - member of the National Diet, Minister of Justice
- Yasuhiro Ozato - member of the National Diet
- Takashi Uto - member of the National Diet
- Naokuni Nomura - admiral, Minister of Navy
- Mitsuru Ushijima - general
- Masafumi Arima - admiral

Academic

- Hiroshi Enatsu - theoretical physicist, Professor Emeritus at Ritsumeikan University

Culture

- Kawataro Nakajima - literary critic, Chairman of Mystery Writers of Japan, Professor Emeritus at Wayo Women's University, Mystery Writers of Japan Award, Japan Mystery Literature Award

== Surrounding area ==
- Kagoshima-Chūō Station
- Amu Plaza Kagoshima and Amuran Ferris wheel
- Kagoshima High School
- Kagoshima Museum of Environment
- Kagoshima Arena
