= Poly(N-vinylacetamide) =

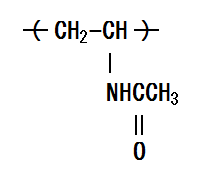
- structure

Names
- IUPAC name Poly(1-acetamidoethylene)
- Other names Poly NVA; Poly-N-vinylcarboxylic acid amide Poly vinylcarboxylic acid amide Poly carboxylic acid amide GE191; PNVA

Identifiers
CAS Number	28408-65-3
ChemSpider	none
CompTox Dashboard (EPA)	DTXSID201011002

Properties
Chemical formula	(C_{4}H_{7}NO)_{n}
Appearance	White powder
Solubility in water	Soluble
- Except where otherwise noted, data are given for materials in their standard state (at 25 °C [77 °F], 100 kPa). Infobox references

Poly(N-vinylacetamide) (PNVA) is a polymer having affinity for both water and alcohol made primarily from N-vinylacetamide (NVA) monomer. The homopolymer of NVA is called GE191 grade. Copolymer of NVA and sodium acrylate called GE167 grade.

== History ==
Showa Denko succeeded in industrialization for the first time in the world.

== Properties ==
- Able to thicken across a wide range of pH
- Able to thicken high salt concentration solutions
- Resistance to acids and alkalis
- Water-soluble
- Adhesion and pressure sensitive adhesion
- Resistant to heat
