= Tsurumaru =

Tsurumaru may refer to:

- Tsurumaru High School, a high school in Kagoshima
- Tsurumaru Station, a railway station in Yūsui, Kagoshima
- Tsurumaru Tsuyoshi, a Japanese Thoroughbred racehorse
