= Kunio Shiota =

Japanese scholar of epigenetics

- 塩田 邦郎 (Shiota Kunio)
- Born: August 19, 1950
- Education: University of Miyazaki, University of Tokyo
- Known for: epigenetics
- Awards: Japanese Society of Veterinary Science Award (1996)
- Scientific career
- Fields: biochemistry
- Workplaces: University of Tokyo, Waseda University

Kunio Shiota (塩田 邦郎, Shiota Kunio; born August 19, 1950) is a Japanese life scientist specializing in biochemistry and epigenetics. He is a Professor Emeritus at University of Tokyo and a former Guest Senior Researcher at Waseda University.

== Biography ==
He graduated from Kagoshima Prefectural Konan High School in 1969 and from Department of Veterinary Sciences, Faculty of Agriculture, University of Miyazaki in 1973. In 1979, he completed Department of Veterinary Medical Sciences, Graduate School of Agriculture, University of Tokyo and got Ph.D. in agriculture. After he completed the graduate school, he joined the Takeda Pharmaceutical Company. In 1987, He retired the company and became an associate professor at University of Tokyo Graduate School of Agricultural and Life Sciences (Department of Animal Resource Sciences and Department of Veterinary Medical Sciences). He received the Japanese Society of Veterinary Science Award for 1996.

He became a professor at University of Tokyo Graduate School of Agricultural and Life Sciences (Department of Animal Resource Sciences and Department of Veterinary Medical Sciences) in 1998. He also served as adjunct professors at National Institute of Genetics, Juntendo University and Kagoshima University. In 2013, Kunio Shiota and Koji Hayakawa's research team at University of Tokyo succeeded in the generation of orexin neurons from pluripotent stem cells (mouse embryonic stem cells) for the first time in the world.

In 2016, he was given the title of Professor Emeritus at University of Tokyo and became a Guest Senior Researcher at Waseda University Research Institute for Science and Engineering.
