= Takeo Miki =

Prime Minister of Japan from 1974 to 1976

- 三木 武夫
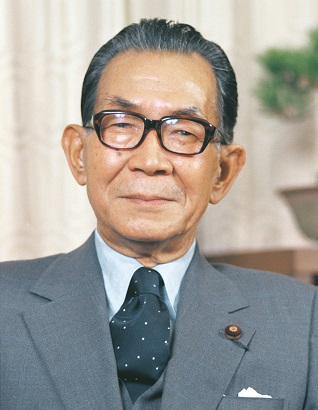
- Official portrait, 1974

Prime Minister of Japan
- In office 9 December 1974 – 24 December 1976
- Monarch: Hirohito
- Deputy: Takeo Fukuda
- Preceded by: Kakuei Tanaka
- Succeeded by: Takeo Fukuda

President of the Liberal Democratic Party
- In office 4 December 1974 – 23 December 1976
- Vice President: Etsusaburo Shiina
- Secretary-General: Yasuhiro Nakasone; Tsuneo Uchida
- Preceded by: Kakuei Tanaka
- Succeeded by: Takeo Fukuda

Deputy Prime Minister of Japan
- In office 29 August 1972 – 12 July 1974
- Prime Minister: Kakuei Tanaka
- Preceded by: Ichirō Kōno (1965)
- Succeeded by: Takeo Fukuda
Ministerial offices
Director-General of the Environmental Agency
In office 22 December 1972 – 12 July 1974
Prime Minister	Kakuei Tanaka
Preceded by	Osanori Koyama
Succeeded by	Matsuhei Mōri
Minister for Foreign Affairs
In office 3 December 1966 – 28 October 1968
Prime Minister	Eisaku Satō
Preceded by	Shiina Etsusaburo
Succeeded by	Eisaku Satō
Minister of International Trade and Industry
In office 3 June 1965 – 3 December 1966
Prime Minister	Eisaku Satō
Preceded by	Yoshio Sakurauchi
Succeeded by	Watarō Kanno
Director-General of the Science and Technology Agency
In office 18 July 1961 – 18 July 1962
Prime Minister	Hayato Ikeda
Preceded by	Masanosuke Ikeda
Succeeded by	Tsuruyo Kondo
In office 12 June 1958 – 31 December 1958
Prime Minister	Nobusuke Kishi
Preceded by	Matsutarō Shōriki
Succeeded by	Tatsunosuke Takasaki
Director-General of the Economic Planning Agency
In office 12 June 1958 – 31 December 1958
Prime Minister	Nobusuke Kishi
Preceded by	Ichirō Kōno
Succeeded by	Tatsunosuke Takasaki
Minister of Transport
In office 10 December 1954 – 22 November 1955
Prime Minister	Ichirō Hatoyama
Preceded by	Mitsujirō Ishii
Succeeded by	Shinji Yoshino
Minister of Communications
In office 1 June 1947 – 10 March 1948
Prime Minister	Tetsu Katayama
Preceded by	Sasayoshi Hitotsumatsu; Tetsu Katayama (acting)
Succeeded by	Eiji Tomiyoshi
Party political offices
Secretary-General of the Liberal Democratic Party
In office July 1964 – June 1965
President	Hayato Ikeda; Eisaku Satō
Vice President	Shojiro Kawashima
Preceded by	Shigesaburō Maeo
Succeeded by	Kakuei Tanaka
In office December 1956 – July 1957
President	Tanzan Ishibashi; Nobusuke Kishi
Preceded by	Nobusuke Kishi
Succeeded by	Shojiro Kawashima
Chairman of the National Cooperative Party
In office 30 June 1947 – 28 April 1950
Preceded by	Position established
Succeeded by	Position abolished

Member of the House of Representatives
- In office 1 May 1937 – 14 November 1988
- Preceded by: Hyōkichi Takashima
- Succeeded by: Shunichi Yamaguchi
- Constituency: Tokushima 2nd (1937–1946); Tokushima at-large (1946–1988)

Personal details
- Born: 17 March 1907 Awa, Tokushima, Japan
- Died: 14 November 1988 (aged 81) Chiyoda, Tokyo, Japan
- Party: Liberal Democratic (after 1955)
- Other political affiliations: CDP (1946–1947); NCP (1947–1950); NDP (1950–1952); Kaishintō (1952–1954); JDP (1954–1955)
- Spouse: Mutsuko Mori (m. 1940)
- Relatives: Nobuteru Mori (father-in-law)
- Education: Meiji University; University of Southern California
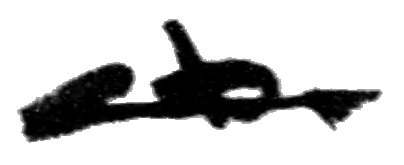
- Signature

Takeo Miki (三木 武夫, Miki Takeo; 17 March 1907 – 14 November 1988) was a Japanese politician who served as Prime Minister of Japan from 1974 to 1976.

A native of Tokushima Prefecture, Miki was educated at Meiji University and the University of Southern California. He was first elected to the National Diet in 1937, and after the war was leader of the National Cooperative Party, serving as communications minister from 1947 to 1948 under Tetsu Katayama. Miki later joined the Liberal Democratic Party and served as transportation minister under Ichirō Hatoyama, held posts in the cabinets of Nobusuke Kishi and Hayato Ikeda, and served as international trade and industry minister in 1965–1966 and foreign minister in 1966–1968 under Eisaku Satō. Miki became prime minister in 1974 upon the resignation of Kakuei Tanaka, who had faced allegations of corruption, but his attempts to pass anti-monopoly legislation and political funding laws failed amid opposition from within his party. Miki announced a "1 percent of GDP" guideline for defense spending, thus setting a precedent for the next two decades. The LDP was damaged by the Lockheed scandal in 1976, and lost its majority in the that year's election. Miki was embarrassed by this result, resigned as premier, and was succeeded by Takeo Fukuda.

== Early life and education ==
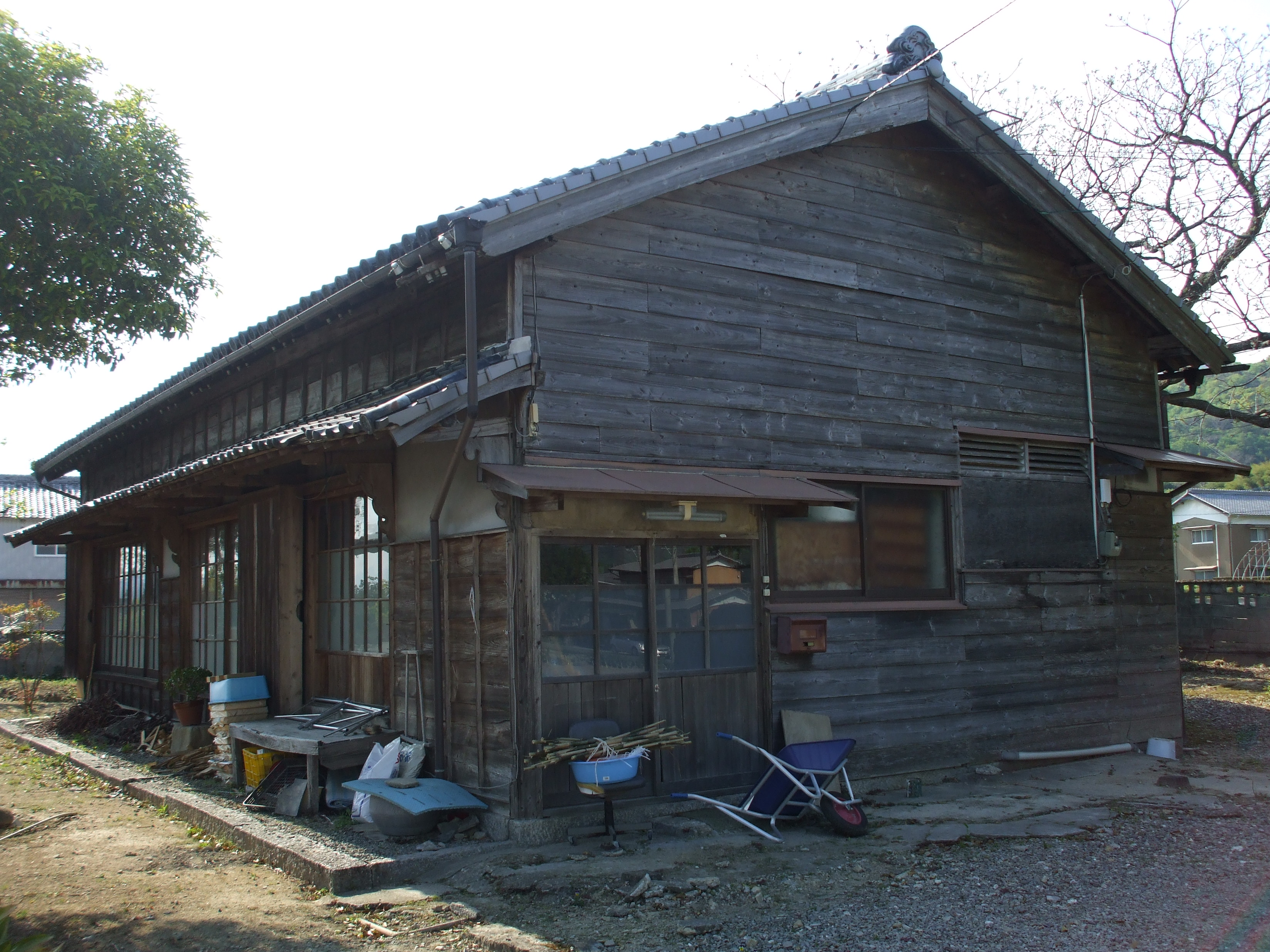
Takeo Miki's birthplace

Takeo Miki was born on 17 March 1907, in Gosho, Tokushima Prefecture (present-day Awa, Tokushima), the only child of farmer-merchant Hisayoshi Miki and his wife Takano. Aside from farming, his father traded fertilizers, sake, rice and general goods, though he was not a wealthy farmer (gōnō) or from a family of pedigree (kyūke). Hisayoshi was born in Kakihara, near Gosho, to farmer Rokusaburō Ino'o, and after briefly working in Osaka, he returned and began working for the Shibata family, the largest landowner in Gosho. He met Takano Miki, the daughter of farmer Tokitarō Miki, when the two were working for the Shibata family. Hisayoshi took Takano's surname after marriage, and the newlywed were given a house by the Shibata family.

When Miki was born, Hisayoshi was 33 and Takano was 38 years old, and Miki was raised with much love as he was the only child. His mother was particularly careful about his healthcare.

While enrolled at Meiji University's Faculty of Law, Miki was able to spend four years from 1932 to 1936 traveling around the United States, where he saw firsthand both Anglo-American liberal society as well as that society's aversion towards totalitarian states such as Nazi Germany, Fascist Italy, and the Soviet Union. He attended the University of Southern California in Los Angeles, and was later awarded an honorary doctorate in law from the institution in 1966.

== Political career ==
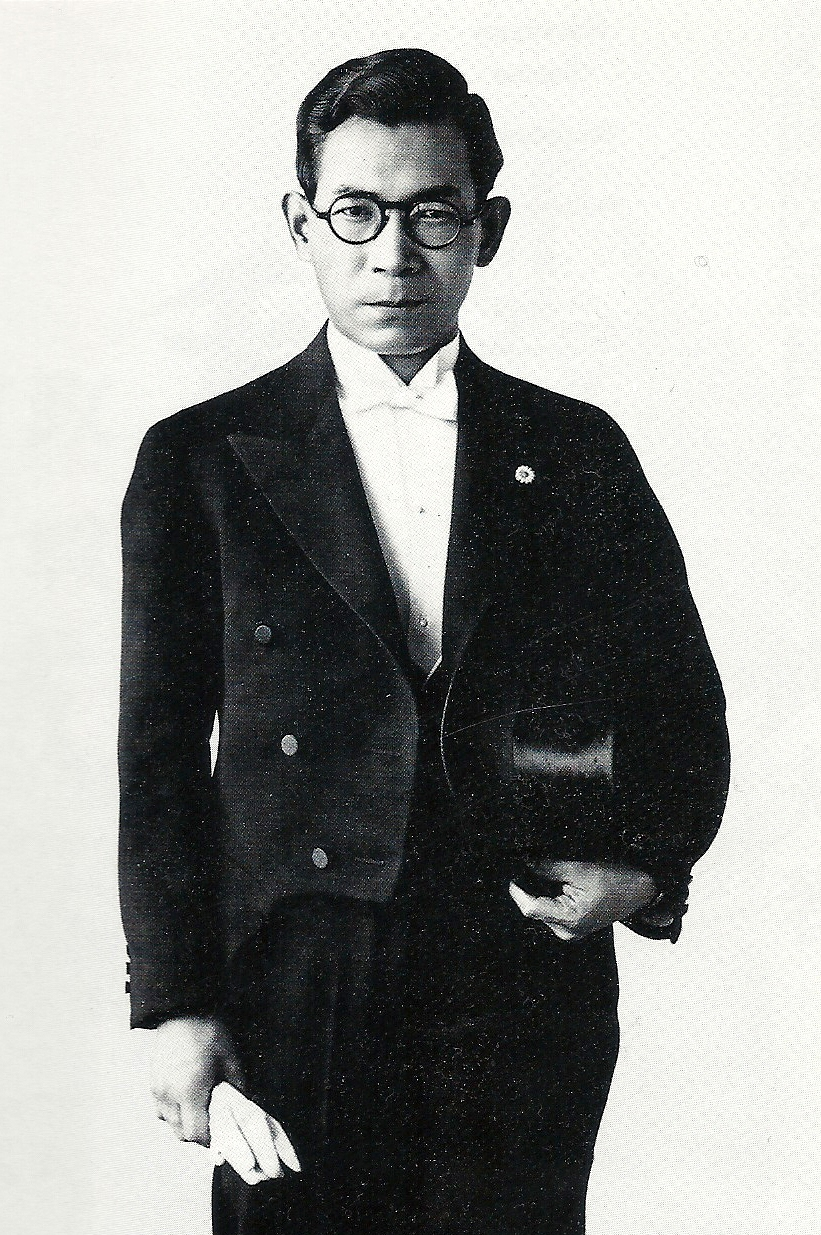
Miki in 1937

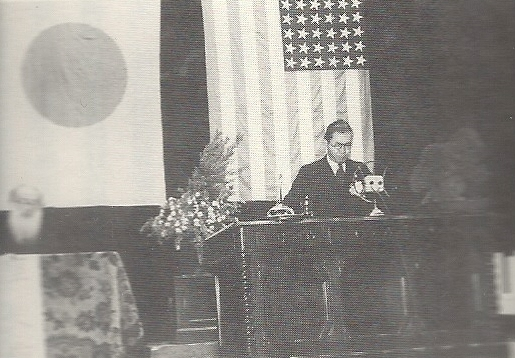
Miki giving a speech at the Japan-U.S. Friendship National Convention held at the Hibiya Public Hall in 1938

During 1937, Miki was elected to the Imperial Diet; he remained there for the rest of his life, winning re-election no fewer than 19 times over 51 years. In the 1942 general election he openly voiced opposition to the military government under Hideki Tojo and still managed to win a seat; his efforts at this time were assisted by Kan Abe, the grandfather of Prime Minister Shinzo Abe.

In the earlier post-war period, Miki led the centrist National Cooperative Party in the 1947 and 1949 general elections, to limited success. In the early 1950s, Miki joined Ichirō Hatoyama's Democratic Party, which was one of the two main conservative factions of the time and took a stance that was critical of Shigeru Yoshida and his Liberal Party. These two factions eventually merged in 1955 to form the modern-day Liberal Democratic Party (LDP), which Miki joined as well.

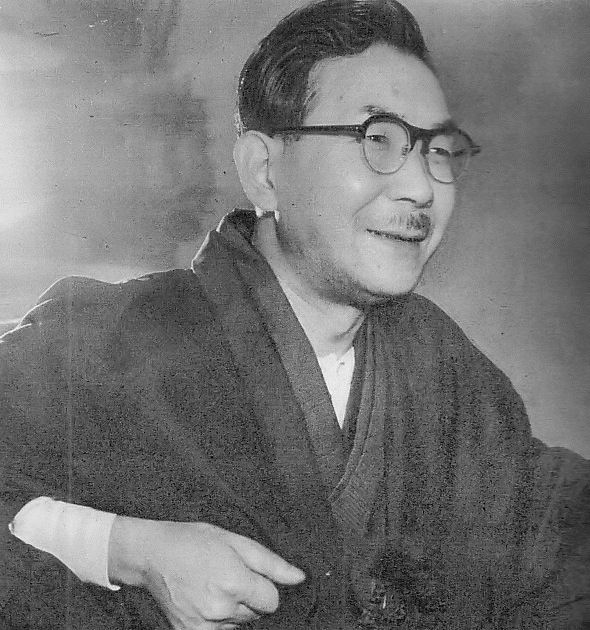
Miki in 1952

As the head of an LDP faction, Miki held cabinet posts in the administrations of Ichirō Hatoyama, Nobusuke Kishi, Hayato Ikeda, and Eisaku Satō. However, he was especially critical of the Kishi administration, and was strongly opposed to Kishi's handling of the massive 1960 Anpo protests against the U.S.-Japan Security Treaty. When Kishi railroaded the treaty through the Diet on 19 May 1960, Miki's faction absented itself from the vote in protest of Kishi's heavy-handed approach. On 28 May, Miki and fellow faction leader Kenzō Matsumura issued a public call for Kishi's resignation, and Kishi was ultimately forced to resign in July. However, when Ichirō Kōno floated a plan later that summer to split up the LDP, Miki and Matsumura ultimately declined to support him. As punishment for taking part in the anti-Kishi rebellion, Miki was initially excluded from the cabinet of Kishi's successor Hayato Ikeda. However by the following year, Ikeda had cemented his power enough to overcome the objections of the Kishi faction and bring Miki back into the cabinet as Head of the Science and Technology Agency.

Although Ikeda was re-elected as party president in 1964, he retired soon afterwards due to illness. In the debate over who would succeed Ikeda as prime minister, Miki supported Kishi's brother Eisaku Satō while Matsumura supported Ichirō Kōno. This led to a falling out between Miki and his erstwhile ally Matsumura, and thereafter the two men went their separate ways. Miki's support for Satō also healed the rift that had been created when he had opposed Kishi during the Anpo crisis, and Miki was rewarded for his support with powerful posts in the Satō cabinet, first as Minister of International Trade and Industry (1965–66) and then as Minister of Foreign Affairs (1966–68).

As the foreign minister under Satō, Miki secretly met in 1967 with American ambassador to Japan U. Alexis Johnson to discuss "how to reconcile Japanese desire for reversion [of Okinawa] with [American] military requirements." This was part of a series of resolute attempts by several Japanese officials within the same time period aimed at convincing the United States to reconsider its continued hold on Okinawa, which the U.S. had formerly insisted should remain under American protection so long as there was any remaining instability in East Asia. In matters of regional foreign policy, Miki was an early advocate of Asia-Pacific economic cooperation and, in 1968, he said that "'it would be an act of suicide on our part to create an exclusive and closed trading bloc in the Pacific area." Despite this, ASEAN would later decline to invite now-Prime Minister Miki to the organisation's very first summit at Bali in 1976, as economic perceptions towards Japan in the region were negative because of resentment towards both wartime abuse by Imperial Japan as well as Japan's current status as a powerful economic giant with a heavy trade surplus.

== Premiership (1974–1976) ==
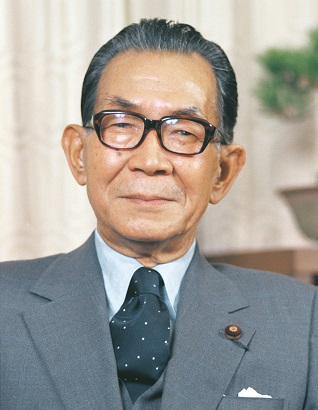
- Official portrait, 1974
- Premiership of Takeo Miki; 9 December 1974 – 24 December 1976
- Monarch: Emperor Shōwa
- Cabinet: Miki Cabinet
- Party: Liberal Democratic
- Seat: Naikaku Sōri Daijin Kantei
- Constituency: Tokushima at-large
- Emblem of the Prime Minister

Miki took over from Kakuei Tanaka as Prime Minister on 9 December 1974, following the latter's implication in the corruption concerning real-estate and construction companies. The attractiveness of Miki to the LDP bosses was chiefly due to his personal integrity, and his weak power base from his small faction. In fact, Miki had neither expected nor wanted to be prime minister at all, as was reflected when upon his election he murmured "a bolt from the blue".

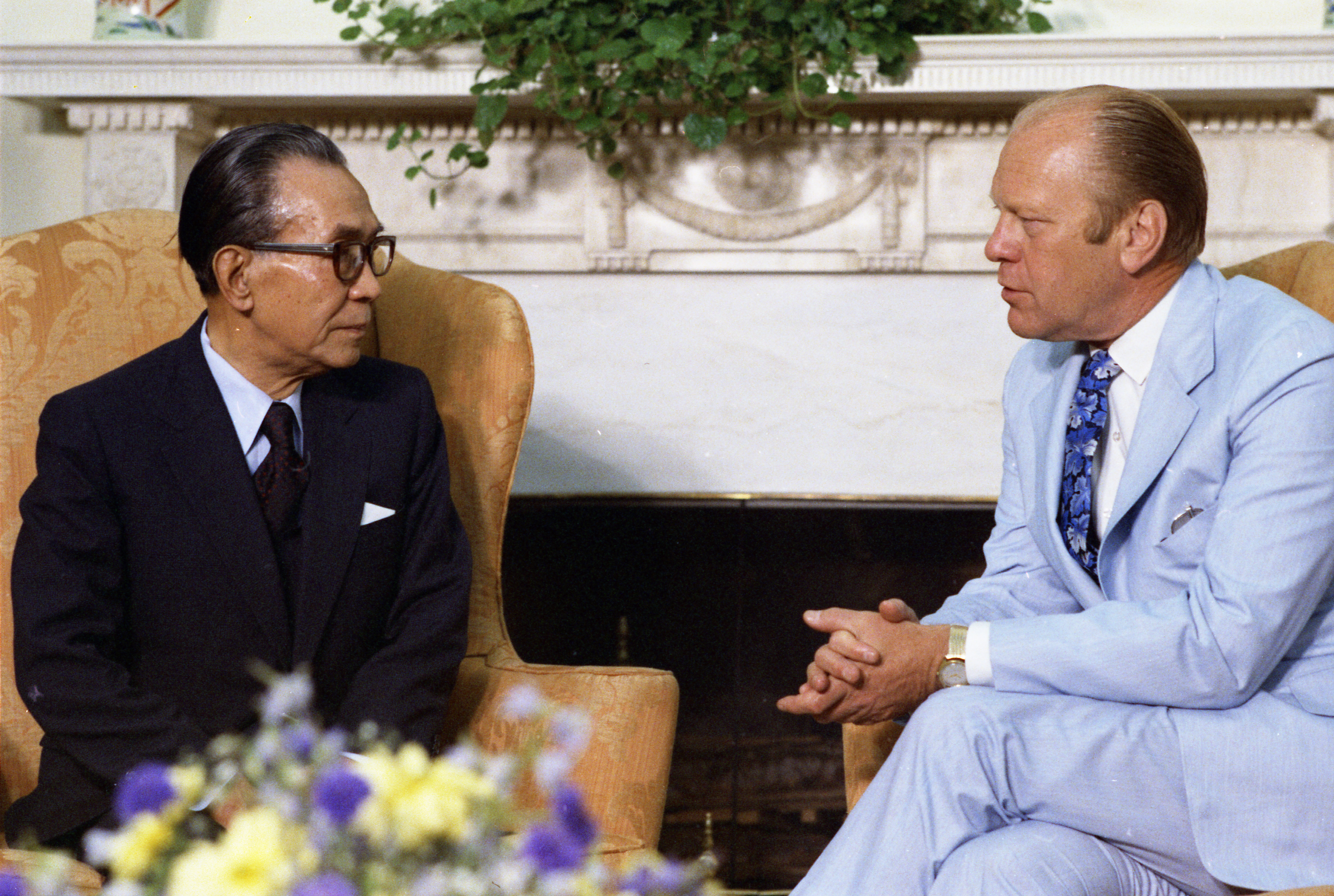
Miki meeting with US President Gerald Ford in the Oval Office, 1975

While Miki was at the funeral of ex-PM Eisaku Sato in 1975, he was assaulted by a right-wing extremist named Hiroyoshi Fudeyasu, the secretary-general of the Greater Japan Patriotic Party with foreign dignitaries nearby. This caused criticism of the Tokyo Metropolitan Police over not doing enough to ensure his safety.

In a 1976 Diet session, Miki reaffirmed a past order of Prime Minister Satō's cabinet dating back to 1967 in which the percent of the national GDP allocated towards defense spending was frozen so as to not exceed 1%. This policy taboo was broken by future Prime Minister Yasuhiro Nakasone in the 1980s, but was revived in 1990 by another future Prime Minister, Toshiki Kaifu, who was a member of the faction that descended from Miki's faction. This policy has again come under renewed attention within modern Japan in light of contemporary discussions about constitutional revision and, by extension, the possible expansion of Japan's defense capabilities. In any event, Miki also pushed the Diet to fully ratify the Treaty on the Non-Proliferation of Nuclear Weapons, and he also worked to further strengthen previous policies set in motion by Prime Minister Satō which virtually committed Japan to not engage in the export of arms to any country.

After being elected, Miki attempted to reform the LDP, relentlessly investigating the Lockheed bribery scandals and refusing to halt the criminal prosecutions being made against his predecessor. Miki also pursued political finance reforms. These activities made him a large number of enemies within the party, and a campaign literally called "Down with Miki" ("Miki oroshi") was started by influential faction leaders. Despite Miki's personal popularity with the public, the Lockheed scandal reflected poorly on the party, which lost its overall majority in the 1976 election to the Diet and had to make deals with minor parties to remain in power. As is customary for Japanese political officials following heavy party setbacks, Miki then resigned. He was succeeded on 24 December 1976, by Takeo Fukuda.

== Personal life ==
In 1940, Miki married Mutsuko Mori, daughter of the prominent Japanese businessman and politician, Nobuteru Mori, who had founded Showa Denko, a major chemical engineering firm. His brother-in-law, Kiyoshi Mori, was the head of the now defunct Management and Coordination Agency, which would later become the Ministry of Internal Affairs and Communications. His other brother-in-law, Yoshihide Mori, served as the chief of the Environment Agency, the forerunner of the present-day Ministry of the Environment.

== Legacy ==
In Mao Zedong's final days, he took a great interest in Miki's political condition, as Miki was suffering a coup d'état from amongst his own party. Mao had never shown any interest in Miki before, or even mentioned him.

NFL player Takeo Spikes was named after Miki.

=== Connection to Seattle ===
During his time in Seattle, Miki spent a period as a dishwasher at noted Japanese restaurant Maneki.

To commemorate the ties of Japan to America, and Seattle in particular, Miki gave 1,000 cherry trees to Seattle to commemorate the United States Bicentennial in 1976. This gift gave birth to the Seattle Cherry Blossom Festival, still running annually.

=== Slang term ===
In Hong Kong, the name "Takeo Miki" (三木武夫) is sometimes used to describe actors or actresses with wooden or no emotional expressions during movies or TV dramas. Some have said that the origin for the slang term stems from Miki's wooden expression during his appearance in news reports.

== Honours ==
- Grand Cordon of the Order of the Chrysanthemum (14 November 1988; posthumous)

=== Foreign honour ===
- Mexico: Sash of the Order of the Aztec Eagle (18 September 1967)

== Gallery ==
Memorandum of Conversation, White House state dining room, June 30, 1976

Party political offices
Preceded by Post established	Secretary-General of the National Cooperative Party; 1947	Succeeded by Seiichi Okada
Preceded by Nobusuke Kishi	Secretary-General of the Liberal Democratic Party; 1956-1957	Succeeded by Shōjiro Kawashima
Preceded by Jūichirō Tsukada	Chairman of the Policy Research Council, Liberal Democratic Party; 1957-1958	Succeeded by Takeo Fukuda
Preceded by Okinori Kaya	Chairman of the Policy Research Council, Liberal Democratic Party; 1963-1964	Succeeded by Hideo Sutō
Preceded by Shigesaburō Maeo	Secretary-General of the Liberal Democratic Party; 1964-1965	Succeeded by Kakuei Tanaka
Preceded by Kakuei Tanaka	President of the Liberal Democratic Party; 1974-1976	Succeeded by Takeo Fukuda
Political offices
Preceded by Tetsu Katayama	Minister of Communications; 1947–1948	Succeeded by Eiji Tomiyoshi
Preceded by Mitsujiro Ishii	Minister of Transport; 1954–1955	Succeeded by Shinji Yoshino
Preceded by Ichirō Kōno	Director of the Economic Planning Agency; 1958	Succeeded by Koichi Seko
Preceded by Matsutarō Shōriki	Minister of State, Head of the Science and Technology Agency; 1958	Succeeded by Tatsunosuke Takasaki
Preceded by Masanosuke Ikeda	Minister of State, Head of the Science and Technology Agency; 1961–1962	Succeeded by Tsuruyo Kondo
Preceded by Yoshio Sakurauchi	Minister of International Trade and Industry; 1965–1966	Succeeded by Watarō Kanno
Preceded by Etsusaburō Shiina	Minister of Foreign Affairs; 1966–1968	Succeeded by Kiichi Aichi
Preceded by Shūji Masutani	Deputy Prime Minister of Japan; 1972–1974	Succeeded by Takeo Fukuda
Preceded by Kakuei Tanaka	Prime Minister of Japan; 1974–1976	Succeeded by Takeo Fukuda
