= Toshifumi Kosehira =

Japanese politician (1949–2015)

- 小斉平 敏文
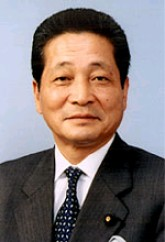

Member of the House of Councillors
- In office 29 July 2001 – 28 July 2007
- Preceded by: Motoi Nagamine
- Succeeded by: Itsuki Toyama
- Constituency: Miyazaki at-large

Member of the Miyazaki Prefectural Assembly
- In office 1991–2001

Member of the Kobayashi City Council
- In office 1979–1991

Personal details
- Born: 30 September 1949 Kobayashi, Miyazaki, Japan
- Died: 9 July 2015 (aged 65)
- Party: Liberal Democratic
- Education: Kagoshima Prefectural Konan High School

Toshifumi Kosehira (小斉平 敏文, Kosehira Toshifumi; September 30, 1949 – July 9, 2015) was a Japanese politician and a member of the National Diet.

== Career ==
Born in Kobayashi, Miyazaki, he graduated from Kagoshima Prefectural Konan High School in 1968.

In 1974, Kosehira became the secretary of Osanori Koyama, a member of the House of Representatives.

He served on the Kobayashi City Assembly for three terms beginning in 1979, and on the Miyazaki Prefectural Assembly for three terms beginning in 1991.

He was elected to the House of Councillors of the National Diet from the Miyazaki at-large district in the 2001 election and served as Parliamentary Secretary for Agriculture, Forestry and Fisheries with Yasushi Kaneko beginning in November 2005. He was a member of the Liberal Democratic Party.
