= Nobuteru =

- Gender: Male

Origin
- Origin: Japanese
- Meaning: Different meanings depending on the kanji used

Nobuteru (written: 伸晃, 信輝 or 亘輝) is a masculine Japanese given name. Notable people with the name include:

- Nobuteru Ishihara (石原 伸晃) (born 1957), Japanese politician
- Nobuteru Maeda (前田 亘輝) (born 1965), Japanese singer-songwriter
- Nobuteru Mori, Japanese businessman and politician
- Nobuteru Taniguchi (谷口 信輝) (born 1971), Japanese racing driver
- Nobuteru Yūki (結城 信輝) (born 1962), Japanese manga artist, illustrator and animator
