= Kikuo Ogyū =

Japanese medical scientist

Kikuo Ogyū (April 29, 1895 - November 27, 1981) was a Japanese medical scientist, professor emeritus of Kyoto University, president and professor emeritus of Kansai Medical University, and a director of Kyorin University.

== Biography ==
The Ogyū family is famous for its Confucian scholar, Sorai Ogyū.

Kikuo's father, Rokuzo Ogyū was originally named Rokuzo Fukunaga. He was born in 1859 in Azabu Shin-ami-machi, Edo, as the third son of Seiwemon Fukunaga, a shogunate retainer, and was adopted by the Ogyū family and succeeded to their family. He later entered the medical school of the University of Tokyo and became the second professor of ophthalmology at Chiba Medical School (now Chiba University School of Medicine), laying the foundation of modern ophthalmology.

Kikuo was born at 79 Inohana-cho, Chiba City, Chiba Prefecture in 1895 as the third son of Rokuzo. After graduating from Chiba Prefectural Chiba Middle School (now Chiba Prefectural Chiba Junior and Senior High School) and Seventh Higher School Zoshikan (now Kagoshima University), he entered Kyoto Imperial University (now Kyoto University) Medical School, graduating in 1922 and joining Junjiro Shimazono's Internal Medicine Department. He then engaged in research at the Department of Pharmacology, which was led by Kurata Morishima. He was promoted to assistant professor and then to professor in 1932. He also had a laboratory at the Institute of Chemical Research of Kyoto University and served as Dean of the School of Medicine from December 27, 1948 to December 27, 1952. He received the Order of the Rising Sun, Gold Rays with Rosette in 1966. His grave is at Jounji Temple in Numazu City.

== Accomplishments ==
His achievements include synthesis of antimony-hexonate and treatment of schistosoma japonicum infection, as well as autonomic and central nervous system pharmacology, especially analgesics.

== Books ==
- 『薬理学』(Pharmacology)（Nanko Do, 1954）
- 熱と熱さましの話 (About fever and antifebrile). Shone bunko vol. 10 no.2 (1947)
