= Mutsuko =

- Gender: Female

Origin
- Origin: Japanese
- Meaning: Different meanings depending on the kanji used

Mutsuko (written: 睦子 or むつ子) is a feminine Japanese given name. Notable people with the name include:

- Mutsuko Miki (三木 睦子; 1917–2012), Japanese actress
- Mutsuko Nagata (永田 睦子; born 1976), Japanese basketball player
- Mutsuko Sakura (桜 むつ子; 1921–2005), Japanese actress

== Fictional characters ==
- Mutsuko Sakura (佐倉 睦子), a character in the manga series Major 2nd
