= Shodex =

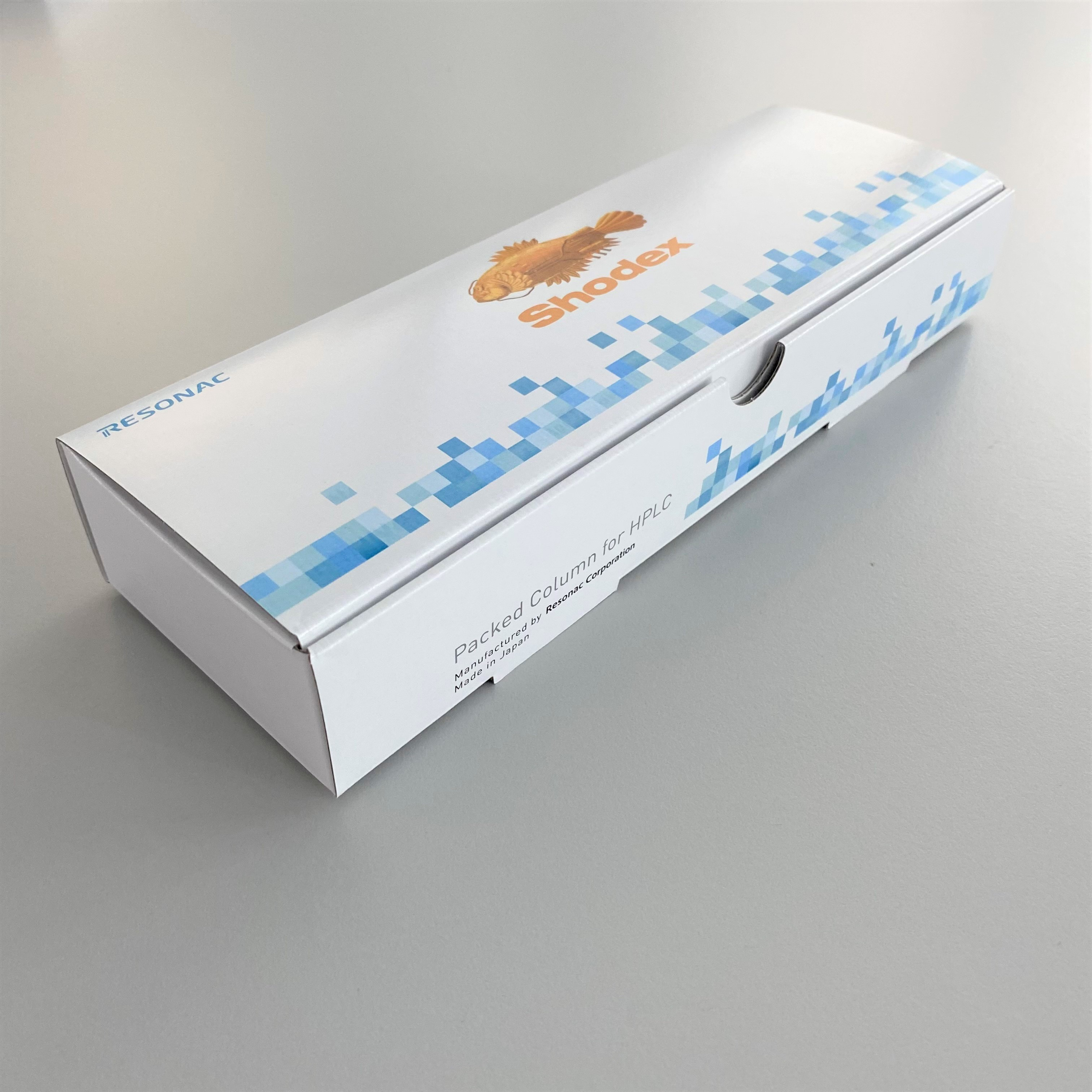

Shodex is the brand name of HPLC columns and is best known for polymer-based columns. The product range covers aqueous and organic Size Exclusion Chromatography columns for large (bio-)molecules, columns for the routine analysis of sugars and organic acids, and a variety of Reversed Phase and HILIC columns. Additionally they offer Ion Chromatography (IC) and Ion Exchange columns.

Shodex HPLC Columns are manufactured in Japan by Resonac (formerly known as Showa Denko), one of the largest Japanese chemical companies and listed in the Nikkei 225 index. They produce around 260 different columns, most packed with polymer-based particles, and have been doing so since 1974.

The portfolio includes standard analytical columns, semi-micro columns, and preparative columns. Also size exclusion chromatography calibration standards are available (Pullulan, Polystyrene, Polymethylmethacrylate)

Shodex is distributed worldwide by the different sales offices and by a range of local distributors.
