= N-Vinylacetamide =

- structure

Names
- Preferred IUPAC name N-Ethenylacetamide
- Other names N-Vinylacetamide; NVA; N-Vinylcarboxylic acid amide N-Carboxylic acid amide Vinylamide; NVA monomer

Identifiers
CAS Number	5202-78-8; polymer: 28408-65-3
3D model (JSmol)	Interactive image
ChemSpider	71210
ECHA InfoCard	100.023.627
EC Number	225-989-8
PubChem CID	78875
UNII	227WR07D3L
CompTox Dashboard (EPA)	DTXSID201011002 DTXSID0063735, DTXSID201011002
- InChI: InChI=1S/C4H7NO/c1-3-5-4(2)6/h3H,1H2,2H3,(H,5,6) Key: RQAKESSLMFZVMC-UHFFFAOYSA-N
- SMILES: CC(=O)NC=C

Properties
Chemical formula	C_{4}H_{7}NO
Molar mass	85.106 g·mol^{−1}
Appearance	White solid
Melting point	54 °C (129 °F; 327 K)
Boiling point	96 °C (205 °F; 369 K)
Solubility in water	soluble
Solubility in acetone	soluble
Solubility in ether	soluble
Solubility in ester	soluble
Solubility in arene	soluble

Hazards
- GHS labelling
Pictograms	(GHS07: Exclamation mark)
Signal word	Warning
Hazard statements	H302, H315, H319
Precautionary statements	P264, P270, P280, P301+P312, P302+P352, P305+P351+P338, P321, P330, P332+P313, P337+P313, P362, P501
Flash point	113 °C (235 °F; 386 K)
- Except where otherwise noted, data are given for materials in their standard state (at 25 °C [77 °F], 100 kPa). Infobox references

N-Vinylacetamide (NVA) is a non-ionic monomer. Copolymers made of NVA and other monomers can exhibit practical characteristics in addition to those common with the existing hydrophilic polymers.

== History ==
NVA is an amphipathic monomer. It was introduced and compounded in the U.S. in 1967. Today, it is recognized as a monomer that does polymerize; however, Showa Denko K.K. succeeded in its industrialization in 1997.

== Properties ==
NVA is soluble in water, various organic solvents and liquid vinyl monomers. It is polymerizable by various radical polymerization processes, depending on the objective. Since NVA itself is a solvent, it can act as a dissolution agent for poorly soluble substances.
