= Eisuke Mori =

Japanese politician

- 森 英介
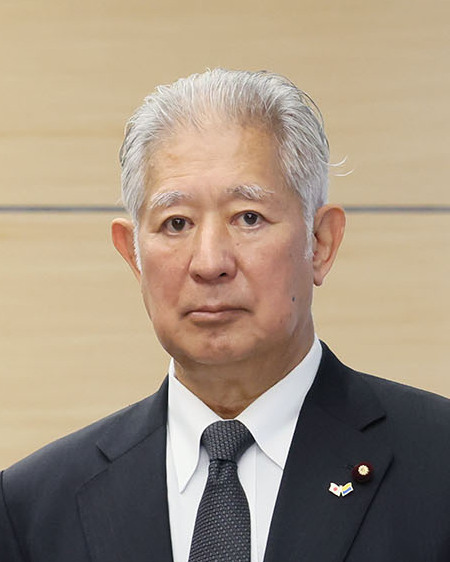
- Mori in 2022

Speaker of the House of Representatives
- Incumbent
- Assumed office 18 February 2026
- Monarch: Naruhito
- Deputy: Keiichi Ishii
- Preceded by: Fukushiro Nukaga

Minister of Justice
- In office 24 September 2008 – 16 September 2009
- Prime Minister: Tarō Asō
- Preceded by: Okiharu Yasuoka
- Succeeded by: Keiko Chiba

Member of the House of Representatives
- Incumbent
- Assumed office 19 February 1990
- Preceded by: Yoshihide Mori
- Constituency: Chiba 3rd (1990–1996); Chiba 11th (1996–present)

Personal details
- Born: 31 August 1948 (age 78) Chiyoda, Tokyo, Japan
- Party: Liberal Democratic
- Relatives: Nobuteru Mori (grandfather); Mutsuko Miki (aunt)
- Education: Tohoku University

Eisuke Mori (森 英介, Mori Eisuke; born 31 August 1948) is a Japanese politician who has served as Speaker of the House of Representatives since 2026. He is a member of the Liberal Democratic Party and is the former Minister of Justice in the Asō Cabinet.

A native of Katsuura, Chiba and graduate of Tohoku University, he joined Kawasaki Heavy Industries in 1974 and received a Ph.D. in engineering. He was elected to the House of Representatives for the first time in 1990. His grandfather is former member of the House of Representatives Nobuteru Mori, his father is former Minister of the Environment Yoshihide Mori, and his uncle is former Somu-cho (総務長官) Kiyomoto Mori. In the Cabinet of Prime Minister Tarō Asō, appointed on 24 September 2008, Mori was appointed Minister of Justice. This was his first appointment to the Cabinet.

Mori is affiliated to the openly revisionist lobby Nippon Kaigi.

House of Representatives (Japan)
Preceded by Shun'ichi Suzuki	Chairman of the Committee on Health, Labour and Welfare; 2002	Succeeded by Takanori Sakai
New title	Chairman of the Special Committee for Investigation of Nuclear Power Issues; 2013–2014	Succeeded by Masayoshi Yoshino
Preceded by Okiharu Yasuoka	Chairman of the Committee on the Constitution; 2016–2019	Succeeded by Tsutomu Sato
Preceded by Tsutomu Sato	Chairman of the Committee on Fundamental National Policies; 2019–2020	Succeeded by Yasukazu Hamada
Preceded by Hiroyuki Hosoda	Chairman of the Deliberative Council on Political Ethics; 2020–2021	Succeeded by Masayoshi Yoshino
Preceded by Hiroyuki Hosoda	Chairman of the Committee on the Constitution; 2021–2024	Succeeded by Yukio Edano
Preceded by Fukushiro Nukaga	Speaker of the House of Representatives; 2026–present	Incumbent
Political offices
Preceded by Ichirō Kamoshita, Yoshio Kimura	Senior Vice Minister of Health, Labour and Welfare; 2003–2004; Served alongside: Takashi Tanihata	Succeeded by Seiichi Eto, Hiroyoshi Nishi
Preceded by Okiharu Yasuoka	Minister of Justice; 2008–2009	Succeeded by Keiko Chiba
