= Kikuo Arakawa =

Japanese internist (1929–2026)

- 荒川 規矩男 (Arakawa Kikuo)
- Born: July 15, 1929; Kagoshima Prefecture, Japan
- Died: January 23, 2026 (aged 96)
- Education: Kyushu University
- Known for: Research of hypertension, cardiovascular medicine
- Awards: World Hypertension League Award (2014), International Society of Hypertension Distinguished Fellow Award (2016)
- Scientific career
- Fields: Medical science
- Workplaces: Fukuoka University, Kyushu University
- Thesis: On the oxidation of non-hydroxyamino acids by periodic acid (1958)

Kikuo Arakawa (荒川 規矩男, Arakawa Kikuo; July 15, 1929 – January 23, 2026) was a Japanese medical scientist and internist specializing in hypertension and cardiovascular medicine. He was a Professor Emeritus at Fukuoka University and the 12th President of the International Society of Hypertension.

== Biography ==
He was from Sueyoshi Town (now Soo City), Kagoshima Prefecture, Japan. He finished Kagoshima Prefectural Daini-Kagoshima Middle School (now Kagoshima Prefectural Konan High School) and Seventh Higher School Zoshikan (now Kagoshima University). He was in the same grade with Isamu Akasaki at the middle school and the higher school.

He graduated from Kyushu University School of Medicine in March 1953 and studied basic medical science at the graduate school. After the graduate school, he worked as an assistant at the Third Department of Internal Medicine of Kyushu University from 1957 and obtained a doctorate in medicine in January 1958.

He had been to America to study under Irvine Page at the Cleveland Clinic from July 1958 to August 1961.

He became an Associate Professor for cardiovascular medicine at Kyushu University in 1964. He made studies of angiotensin receiving the grant of the American National Institutes of Health and succeeded in isolation and structure determination of a human angiotensin for the first time in the world in 1966.

After he became a Professor for cardiovascular medicine at Fukuoka University Faculty of Medicine in 1973, he made studies of exercise therapy for hypertension. His work contributed to the proof of the effectiveness of exercise therapy for hypertension. He worked as a Professor at Fukuoka University to 2000 and was given the title of Professor Emeritus.

He had been a member of the International Society of Hypertension since its inception in 1966. He served as the 12th President of the International Society of Hypertension from 1994 to 1996.

He also served as the President of the Japanese Association of Hypertension and became an honorary member of the Japanese Society of Hypertension.

He received many awards including the World Hypertension League Award for 2014 and the International Society of Hypertension Distinguished Fellow Award for 2016.
