= Mutsuko Miki =

Japanese political activist (1917–2012)

- 三木 睦子
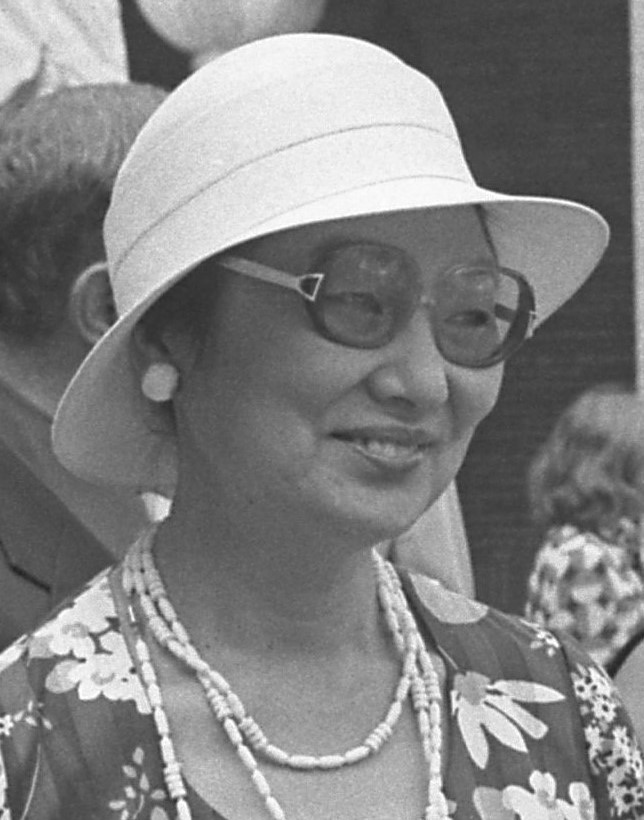
- Mutsuko Miki in 1975

Spouse of the Prime Minister of Japan
- In role 9 December 1974 – 24 December 1976
- Preceded by: Hana Sakamoto
- Succeeded by: Mie Fukuda

Personal details
- Born: 31 July 1917 Chiba, Chiba, Japan
- Died: 31 July 2012 (aged 95) Tokyo, Japan
- Spouse: Takeo Miki (m. 1940; died 1988)

Mutsuko Miki (三木 睦子, Miki Mutsuko; 31 July 1917 – 31 July 2012) was a Japanese activist who advocated on behalf of pacifism, official compensation for comfort women, and improved Japan–North Korea relations. She was the widow of former Japanese Prime Minister Takeo Miki. Miki served as the wife of the Prime Minister of Japan, or First Lady, during her husband's two-year tenure from 1974 to 1976.

== Biography ==
=== Personal life ===
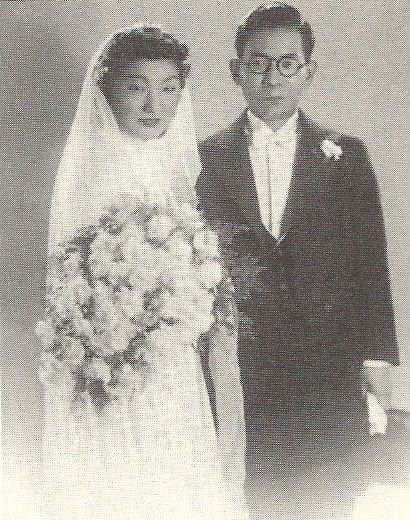
Wedding of Takeo Miki (right) and Mutsuko Mori (left), 26 June 1940

Her father, Nobuteru Mori, held a seat in the Japanese House of Representatives and founded Showa Denko, a major chemical engineering firm. Her brother, Kiyoshi Mori, was the head of the now defunct Management and Coordination Agency, which would later become the interior ministry. Yoshihide Mori, another of Miki's brothers, served as the chief of the Environment Agency, the forerunner of the present-day Ministry of the Environment.

She married Takeo Miki in 1940. Mutsuko Miki held the title of wife of the Prime Minister, from 1974 to 1976. Takeo Miki died in 1988.

=== Activism ===
Miki, a prominent activist, remained active following her husband's death. A vocal supporter of Japanese pacifism, Miki fought against the potential repeal of Article 9 of the Japanese Constitution, a clause in the Constitution of Japan that prohibits an act of war by the state. She campaigned in favor of Article 9 across Japan, often alongside other notable supporters and colleagues. Nobel laureate Kenzaburō Ōe. In 2004, a group of Article 9 supporters, including Miki, Takeshi Umehara, Nobel laureate Kenzaburō Ōe, and writer Hisae Sawachi, joined together to establish the Article 9 Association. The association advocates for the protection of the country's pacifist constitution. Sawachi has noted that Miki once said, "It is an extremely normal thing to express opinions for peace." Her last meeting with the Article 9 Association occurred in May 2011.

Miki advocated for the compensation of comfort women. In 1995, she joined the Asian Women's Fund, a charity established by the Tomiichi Murayama administration to compensate former comfort women. While Miki had called for the establishment of the fund, she publicly severed ties with the charity in 1996 when the Japanese government balked at providing official reparations to the comfort women.

Miki advocated for the normalization of bilateral relations between Japan and North Korea. She called for full diplomatic relations between the countries. In 2000, Miki and former Prime Minister Tomiichi Murayama traveled together to North Korea. Before the trip, Miki created handmade teacups as "souvenirs" for North Koreans whom she met on the trip. She made the teacups from soil collected in Japan, North Korea, and South Korea. According to Murayama, Miki wanted her cups to "convey harmonious relations among the three countries." She was awarded a North Korean order of friendship for her work in 2002. She headed or chaired several other organizations, including the Asian Ladies Friendship Society.

Mutsuko Miki died at a hospital in Tokyo of colon cancer on 31 July 2012, on her 95th birthday. Her survivors included her oldest daughter former member of the House of Councillors, Kiseko Takahashi, and her nephew, Eisuke Mori, who is currently a member of the House of Representatives.

Unofficial roles
Preceded by Hana Tanaka	Spouse of the Prime Minister of Japan; 1974–1976	Succeeded by Mie Fukuda
