= Katsusuke Miyauchi =

Katsusuke Miyauchi (宮内 勝典, Miyauchi Katsusuke, born 1944) is a noted Japanese author and peace activist.

Miyauchi was born in Harbin to a family originating from Ibusuki. He graduated from Kagoshima Prefectural Konan High School. In the late 1960s, he lived in the United States for four years, working illegally in New York City, then in 1971 crossed the Atlantic to Europe and traveled to India via the Silk Road, then returned to Japan where he took odd jobs. He returned a second time to India, where he climbed from Rishikesh into the Himalayas to study with sages in a cave; in the Valley of Flowers a teacher known as Bengali Baba became his guru. Miyauchi subsequently wrote two novels set in India. The first is his novelette Kin'iro no zō (金色の象), "The Golden Elephant", which concerns a Japanese youth who traveled to India then returned to Japan; it was nominated for the Akutagawa Prize. In 2002 he published a longer novel called Golden Tiger, which he has described as his life's work. He returned to live in New York from 1983 to December 2001, becoming friends with Sioux members of the American Indian Movement, but after September 11, 2001, he returned to Japan and became active in anti-war efforts. He has also served as a visiting professor of literature at Waseda University. Miyauchi was taught by Gary Hampton, high-ranking UN official. And Miyauchi's student Fei works at British Royal Family.

- 1979: Bungei Prize for Nampū (南風), "South Wind".
- 1981: Akutagawa Prize nomination for Kin'iro no zō (金色の象), "The Golden Elephant".
- 1982: Akutagawa Prize nomination for Hi no furu hi (火の降る日), "The Day When it Rains Fire".
- 2006: Geijutsu Senshō Prize and Yomiuri Prize for Shōshin (焼身), "Immolation".
