= Tsuruyo Kondo =

Japanese politician (1901–1970)

- 近藤 鶴代
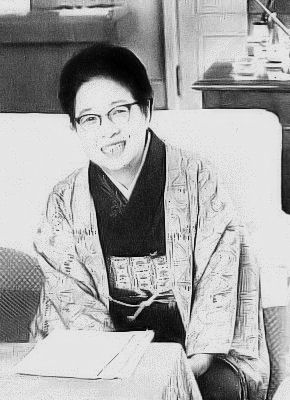
- Kondo in 1962

Director-General of the Science and Technology Agency
- In office 18 July 1962 – 18 July 1963
- Prime Minister: Hayato Ikeda
- Preceded by: Takeo Miki
- Succeeded by: Eisaku Sato

Member of the House of Councillors
- In office 9 July 1956 – 7 July 1968
- Preceded by: Takenori Katō
- Succeeded by: Kazuo Koeda
- Constituency: Okayama at-large

Member of the House of Representatives; from Okayama
- In office 11 April 1946 – 14 March 1953
- Preceded by: Constituency established
- Succeeded by: Kenji Nakahara
- Constituency: At-large district (1946–1947); 2nd district (1947–1953)

Personal details
- Born: 16 November 1901 Niimi, Okayama, Japan
- Died: 9 August 1970 (aged 68)
- Party: Liberal Democratic
- Other political affiliations: JLP (1946–1948); DLP (1948–1950); LP (1950–1955)
- Education: Japan Women's University

Tsuruyo Kondo (近藤 鶴代; 16 November 1901 – 9 August 1970) was a Japanese politician who served as Director General of the Science and Technology Agency from 1962 to 1963, in the cabinet of Hayato Ikeda.

== Early life and education ==
Kondo was born in Niimi, Okayama Prefecture on 16 November 1901. In 1924 she graduated from the Japan Women's University and began working at two schools in Okayama, the Sanyo Koto Jogakko and the Okayama-ken Daiichi Okayama Koto Jogakko. She taught manners and home economics.

== Political career ==
After World War II, Kondo's brother, a politician affiliated with the Japan Progressive Party named Kotani Setsuo, was purged in 1946. This purge prevented him from running for office. Kondo ran in his stead without a party to represent Okayama prefecture in the House of Representatives. She was one of the first female politicians in post-war Japan. After she was elected, she became a member of the Liberal Party, then the Democratic Liberal Party, and then the Freedom Party. In 1948, she was selected to become the Parliamentary Vice-Minister in Shigeru Yoshida's cabinet.

Kondo was elected four times, until she lost the 1953 and 1955 elections. She returned to politics when she was elected to the House of Councillors in 1956, representing Okayama prefecture. Kondo aligned herself with Banboku Ōno's faction within the Liberal Democratic Party. After she was re-elected in 1962, Kondo was offered a position in Hayato Ikeda's cabinet as the chairwoman of the Japanese Atomic Energy Commission and the director of the Japanese Science and Technology Agency. After Masa Nakayama, Kondo was the second woman ever appointed to the Japanese cabinet.

Kondo retired from politics in 1968. She died in 1970 at the age of 68.

Predecessor： Shiro Kiuchi	Chairman of the Committee on Foreign Affairs; 1961-1962	Successor： Seiichi Inoue
Political offices
Predecessor： Takeo Miki	Minister of State; Head of Science and Technology Agency; 1962-1963	Successor: Eisaku Sato
Predecessor： Takeo Miki	Chairman of the Japanese Atomic Energy Commission; 1962-1963	Successor: Eisaku Sato
