= Osanori Koyama =

Japanese politician (1905–1988)

- 小山 長規
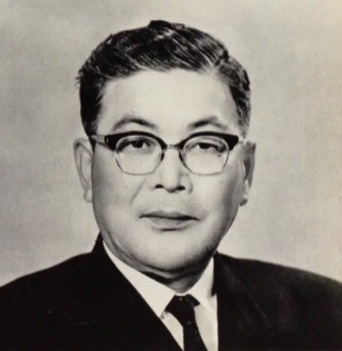

Director-General of Environmental Agency
- In office 7 July 1972 – 22 December 1972
- Prime Minister: Kakuei Tanaka
- Preceded by: Buichi Ōishi
- Succeeded by: Takeo Miki

Minister of Construction
- In office 18 July 1964 – 3 June 1965
- Prime Minister: Hayato Ikeda; Eisaku Satō
- Preceded by: Ichirō Kōno
- Succeeded by: Mitsuo Setoyama

Member of House of Representatives
- In office 8 October 1979 – 2 June 1986
- Preceded by: Mitsuo Setoyama
- Succeeded by: Nariaki Nakayama
- Constituency: Miyazaki 2nd
- In office 28 February 1955 – 9 December 1976
- Preceded by: Yoshio Mochinaga
- Succeeded by: Hisao Horinouchi
- Constituency: Miyazaki 2nd
- In office 24 January 1949 – 14 March 1953
- Preceded by: Kawagoe Hiroshi
- Succeeded by: Mitsuo Setoyama
- Constituency: Miyazaki 2nd

Personal details
- Born: 10 June 1905 Nishimorokata, Miyazaki, Japan
- Died: 31 January 1988 (aged 82)
- Party: Liberal Democratic
- Other political affiliations: NCP (1947–1949); DLP (1949–1950); LP (1950–1955)
- Relatives: Yukio Mori (brother)
- Education: Kagoshima Prefectural Konan High School; Third Higher School
- Alma mater: Tokyo Imperial University

Osanori Koyama (小山 長規, Koyama Osanori; 10 June 1905 – 31 January 1988) was a Japanese politician, a member of the National Diet and a Cabinet member.

== Early life ==
Koyama was born in Kobayashi, Miyazaki. He graduated from Kagoshima Prefectural Daini-Kagoshima Middle School (now Kagoshima Prefectural Konan High School) in 1923 and from Third Higher School (now Kyoto University) in 1926.

In 1929, he graduated from Faculty of Law, Tokyo Imperial University (now University of Tokyo) and joined Mitsubishi Bank. Later, he served as the committee chairs of Mitsubishi Bank Employees' Union.

== Political career ==
Koyama was first elected to a member of the House of Representatives in 1949 and was elected 12 times. He served as Minister of Construction in the Cabinets of Hayato Ikeda and Eisaku Satō, and Director General of Environment Agency in the Cabinet of Kakuei Tanaka. In the National Diet, he served as the chief of the Judge Impeachment Court, the Chairs of Committee on Agriculture, Forestry and Fisheries of the House of Representatives, and the Chairs of Committee on Budget of the House of Representatives. He received the Grand Cordons of the Order of the Rising Sun in 1976.
