= Nobuteru Mori =

Japanese businessman and politician

- 森 矗昶
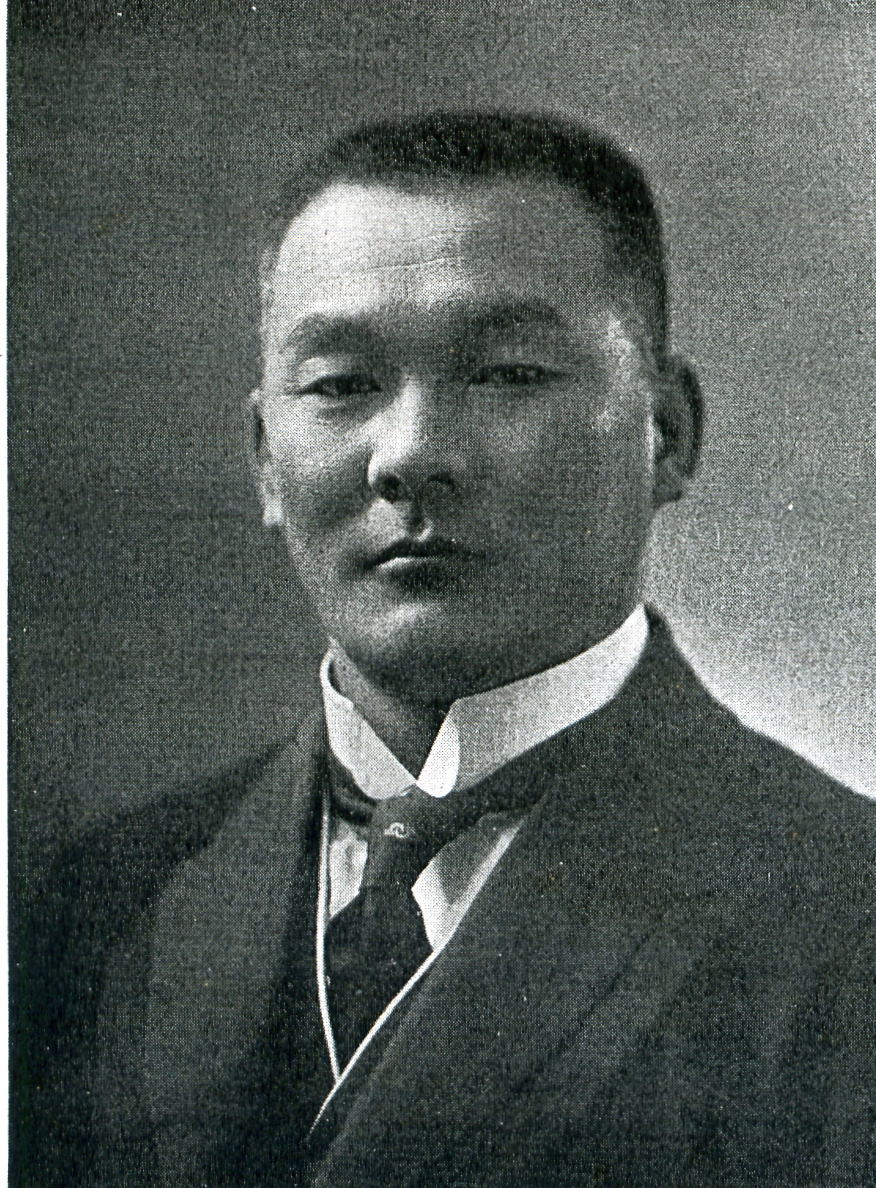
- Mori in 1932

Member of the House of Representatives
- In office 11 May 1924 – 21 January 1932
- Preceded by: Kamon Nishikawa
- Succeeded by: Akira Iwase
- Constituency: Chiba 7th (1924–1928); Chiba 3rd (1928–1932)

Personal details
- Born: 21 October 1884 Katsuura, Chiba, Japan
- Died: 1 March 1941 (aged 56) Tokyo, Japan
- Party: Rikken Seiyūkai
- Spouse: Inu Yamaguchi (m. 1932)
- Children: 9, including Mutsuko
- Relatives: Eisuke Mori (grandson); Tetsuhisa Matsuzaki (grandson); Takeo Miki (son-in-law)

Nobuteru Mori (21 October 1884 – 1 March 1941) was a Japanese businessman and politician who founded Showa Denko, a leading Japanese chemical engineering firm, in the 1930s. He was also a member of the Japanese House of Representatives.

Mori was the father of Mutsuko Miki, an activist and former First Lady, and the father-in-law of former Japanese Prime Minister Takeo Miki.
