= Kurata Morishima =

Japanese scientist (1868–1943)

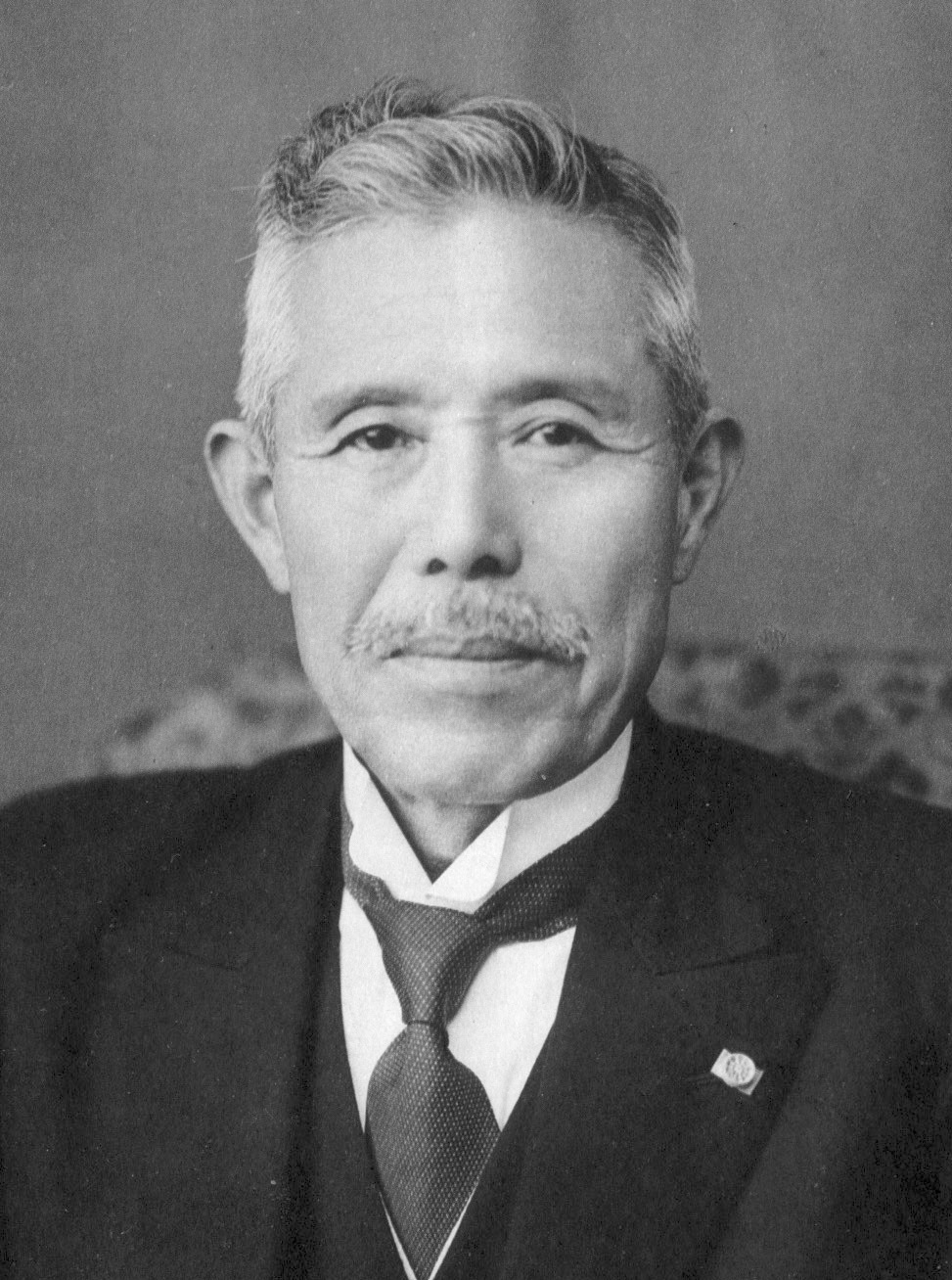
- Morishima circa 1937
- Born: April 29, 1868; Gifu Prefecture, Empire of Japan
- Died: March 18, 1943 (aged 74); Kyoto, Japan
- Burial place: Daitoku-ji, Kyoto, Japan
- Education: Tokyo Imperial University
- Occupation: Professor of pharmacology at Kyoto Imperial University

Kurata Morishima (森島庫太, April 29, 1868 – March 18, 1943) was a Japanese medical scientist and a professor of Kyoto Imperial University Faculty of Medicine.

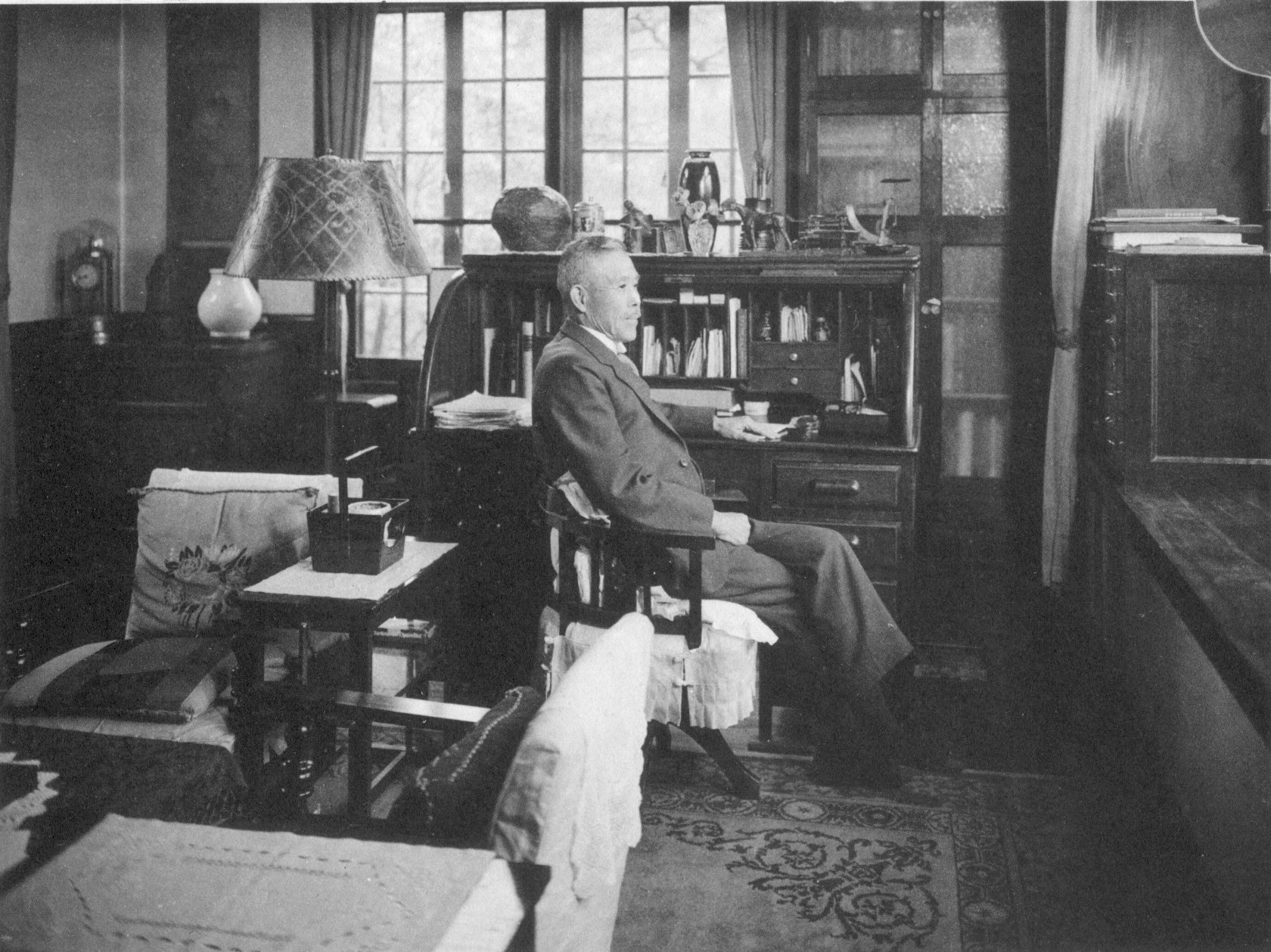
Kurata Morishima, in his study at home, circa 1937.

== Life ==
Born in Gifu Prefecture 1868 as the first son to Gensen Morishima. Graduated from the School of Medicine Tokyo Imperial University in 1893. Appointed as an assistant professor by Professor Juntaro Takahashi in the Department of Pharmacology. From 1896, Morishima studied in Germany and Belgium, first in the laboratory of Schmiedeberg in Strassburg University (then in Germany) and then in Leipzig and Ghent Universities. In 1899, he was appointed as an associate professor of Kyoto Imperial University, Faculty of Medicine, Department of Pharmacology, and then as a full professor after returning to Japan on 1900. Served as the dean of the Faculty from July 21, 1925 to April 21, 1928 and retired on the same year, after which he maintained his position as an emeritus professor. He died in 1943. His grave is in Kohtohin in Daitoku-ji.

== Family ==
His wife Teru was a sister of Akira Fujinami, a professor of Kyoto Imperial University, School of Medicine. His first son, Tatsuo Morishima (Kyoto Imperial University, Faculty of Medicine) died at his age of 27. His second son, Masao Morishima was a geologist at Kyoto University, Faculty of Science. His first daughter Setsu married Shintaro Araki, a professor of Kyoto Prefectural University of Medicine, a son of Torasaburo Araki, a professor of Kyoto Imperial University, School of Medicine. His second daughter Michi married Hatsuo Takeyama, the elder brother of Michio Takeyama, a famous novelist and a professor of Tokyo University.

== Main works ==
- Kurata Morishima, Über Harnsekretion und Glykosurie nach Vergiftung mit Protocurarin und Curarin. Archiv f. experim, Pathol. u. Pharmacol., 52, 28 (1899). (About urine secretion and diabetes after the intoxication with protocurare and curare).
- Kurata Morishima, Über das Vorkommen der Milchsäure im thierischen Organismus mit Berücksichtigung der Arsenvergiftung. Archiv f. experim. Pathol. und Pharmakol., 43, 3-4 (217) (1899). (About production of lactic acid in the animal organ with a consideration of arsenic intoxication)

He also identified active compounds from various herbs such as lycorine from Lycoris radiata and revealed the pharmacological basis of their actions

== Book ==
- Kurata Morishima Pharmacology, 1924, Nankodo, Tokyo.
