= Amuran =

Ferris wheel in Kagoshima, Japan

Coordinates: 31°35′05″N 130°32′33″E

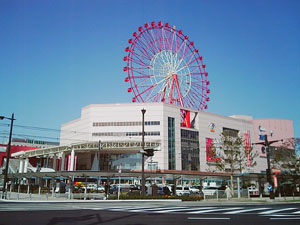
The Amuran Ferris wheel

Amuran (アミュラン, Amyuran) is a Ferris wheel in Kagoshima, Japan. The wheel sits on top of Amu Plaza Kagoshima adjoining Kagoshima-Chūō Station, and is one of the major attractions in the city. The wheel has a diameter of 60 m, and is 91 m from the ground at its highest point. It has 36 gondolas, of which two are completely transparent. The wheel takes approximately 14 minutes and 30 seconds to make a complete revolution.

== History ==
- September 2004: Amuran opens.
- June 2005: Number of riders passes 500,000.
- May 2007: Number of riders passes 1 million.
