= Amu Plaza Kagoshima =

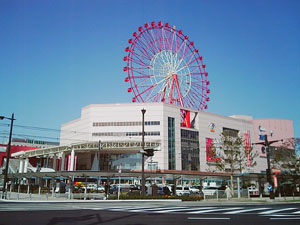
- Amu Plaza Kagoshima, November 2004
- Location: Kagoshima, Japan
- Coordinates: 31.5847°N 130.5425°E
- Address: 1-1 Chūō-chō, Kagoshima-shi, Kagoshima-ken
- Opened: 17 September 2004
- Owner: Kagoshima Terminal Building Corporation
- Num. of stores: 192
- Floor area: 57,000 m^{2} (610,000 sq ft)
- Floors: 7
- Parking: 1,370 spaces
- Website: www.amu-kagoshima.com

Amu Plaza Kagoshima (アミュプラザ鹿児島, Amyu Puraza Kagoshima) is the terminal building adjacent to Kagoshima-Chūō Station. It is owned by the Kagoshima Terminal Building Corporation, which belongs to JR Kyushu. Amu Plaza Kagoshima has about 190 shops. When it opened on 17 September 2004, its floor space was the largest in Kagoshima, surpassing the Yamakataya department store. It was superseded in 2007 by Aeon Kagoshima Shopping Centre.

The name Amu comes from the English "amuse". The symbol of the store is a balancing toy. The building was finished by the time the Kyushu Shinkansen high-speed railway line between Shin-Yatsushiro and Kagoshima Chūō opened on 13 March 2004, but Amu Plaza opened on 17 September, about six months later.

The exterior colour is light pink. It is north of the east gate of Kagoshima-Chūō Station. The area connecting the station and Amu is known as Amu Square and is used for events. The Square also has Amu Vision, a large outdoor television screen, and Amu Studio, a satellite studio of FM Kagoshima. A Ferris wheel, Amuran, can be found on top of the building. It can be seen from most areas of Kagoshima city and has since become the new landmark of the city.

== History ==
Plans to construct a station building near Kagoshima-Chūō Station had begun in the 1980s. In 1984, Kagoshima city council and Japanese National Railways, the precursor of JR, made this plan public. In 1990, it was decided that JR and local department store, Yamakataya, would be the co-tenants. However, these plans were abandoned because of the business climate. In the end, a new plan was adopted in which JR would build its own station building with shops.

JR was going to open Amu Plaza before the Shinkansen line opened the shinkansen start, but this was delayed by six months. Construction of the building started on 18 March 2003, and it was completed in January 2004, when the list of tenant stores was announced. Amu Plaza Kagoshima opened on 17 September 2004. About 2,000 people are employed in Amu Plaza Kagoshima. Combined sales for 2004 to 2005 were 19.1 billion yen, and the number of visitors was 11.4 million, an average of 31,000 people a day.

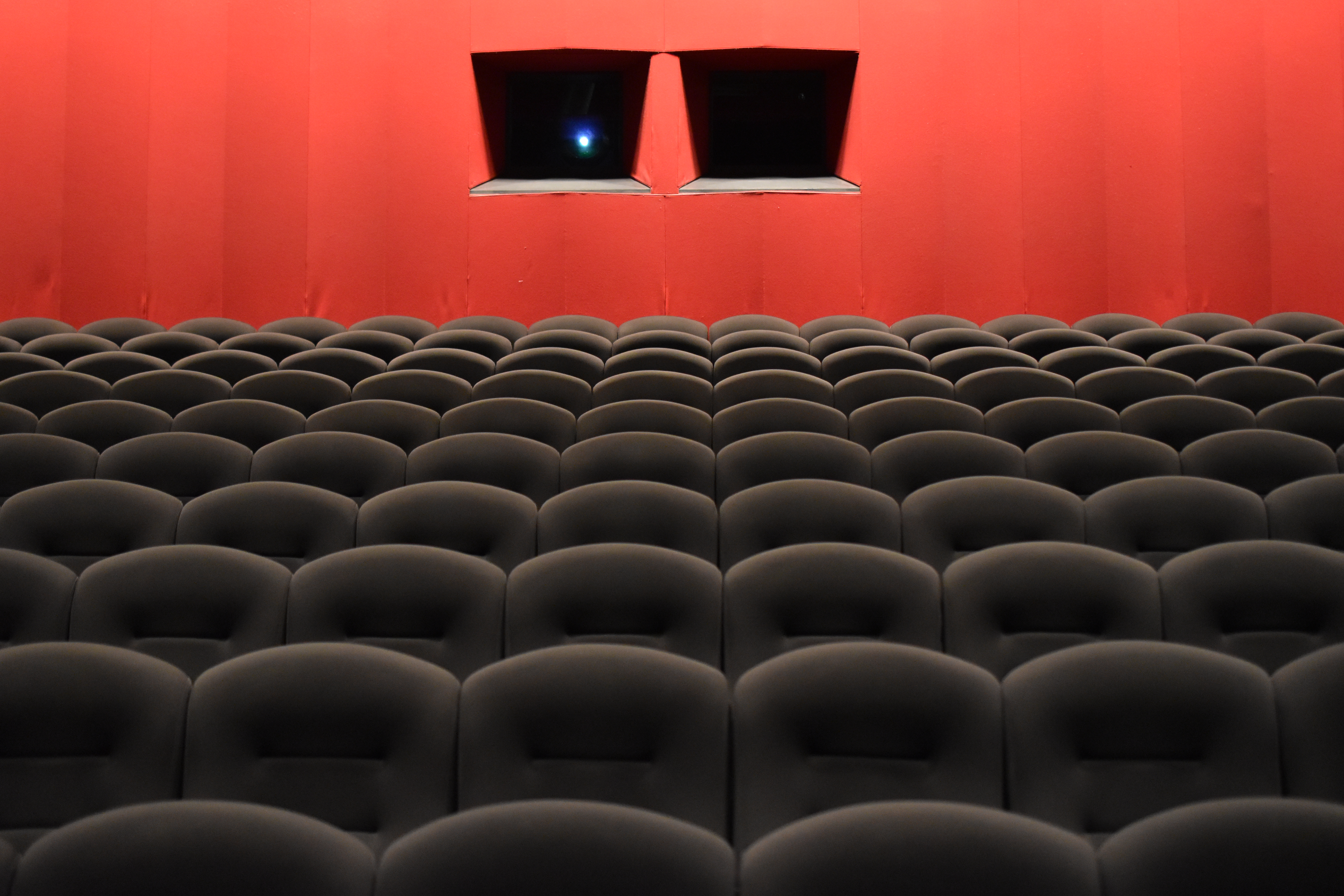
The Kagoshima Mitte 10 cineplex

== Local reaction ==
The average total number of daily passengers on Kagoshima city tram between Kagoshima-Chūō Station and Tenmonkan has increased. The number of regular shoppers to Kagoshima city has increased because of the success in gaining many people from the surrounding areas, especially from Satsumasendai and Izumi. Besides the revitalization in Tenmonkan, other commercial areas have developed. The cinemas in Tenmonkan closed following the opening of the Mitte10 multiplex in Amu Plaza. The number of people around Tenmonkan in 2006 decreased by 9-17% after the opening of Amu Plaza. Influenced by this, the Yamakataya department store renovated some of its floors.

However, when Aeon Kagoshima Shopping Centre opened, Amu Plaza and Tenmonkan decided to compete together against Aeon because of their relative proximity compared to Aeon; Aeon is located further away. Since 5 December 2009, collaborative events have been held by districts both in Tenmonkan and Kagoshima-Chūō Station. The number of visitors to Ichibangai shopping arcade located next to Kagoshima-Chūō station district increased by 20-30% due to the collaboration. However, in 2006, it decreased by 13-37% compared to before the opening of Amu Plaza.
