= Kagoshima University =

University in Japan

Coordinates: 31°34′18″N 130°32′42″E

- 鹿児島大学
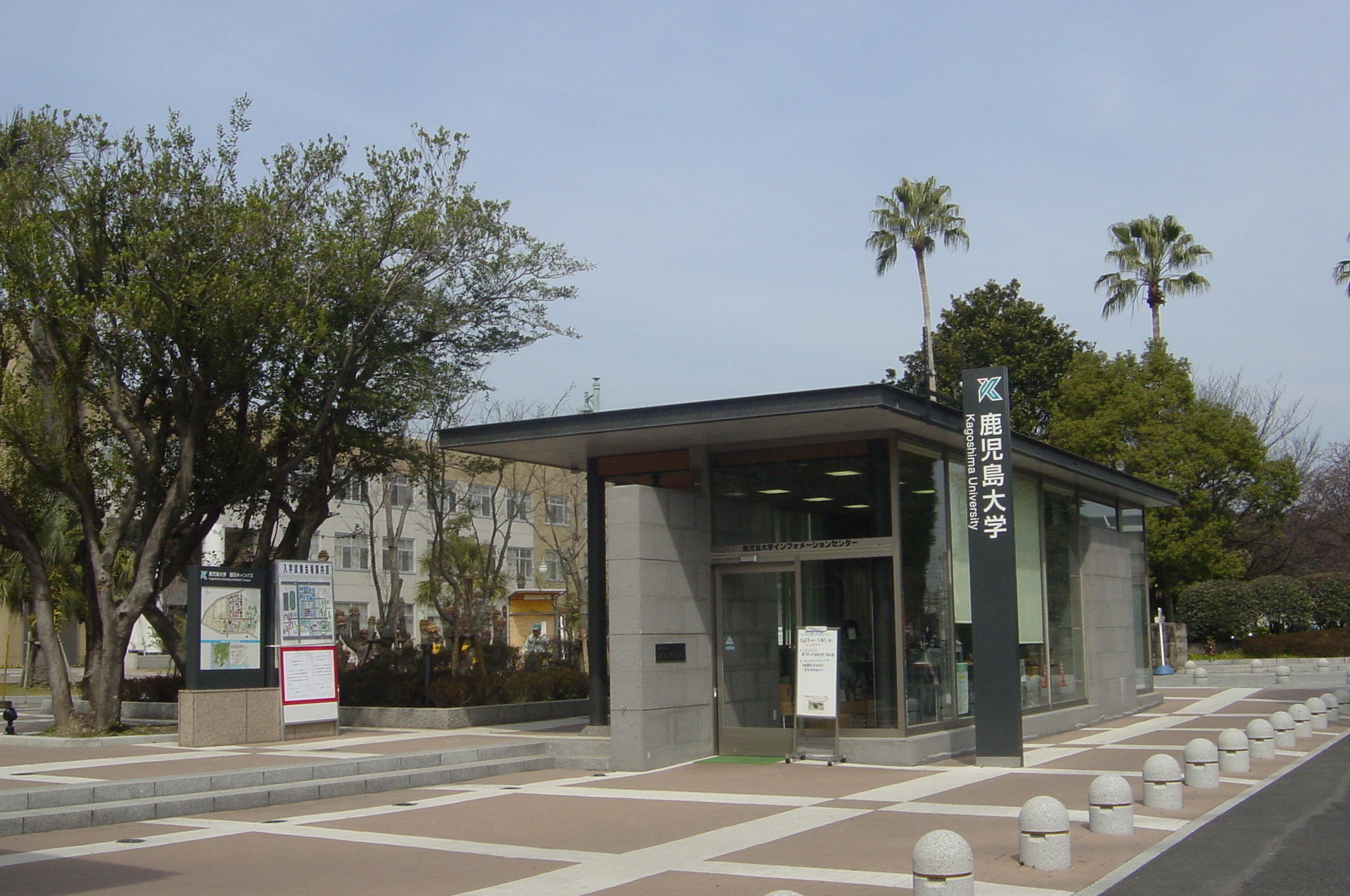
- Motto: 進取の精神・進取の気風 (Enterprising Spirit and Enterprising Ethos)
- Type: Public (National)
- Established: 1773 (established as university : 1949)
- President: Akira SANO (佐野 輝)
- Faculty: Faculties: Law, Economics and the Humanities; Education; Science; Medicine; Dentistry; Engineering; Agriculture; Fisheries; Veterinary Medicine; Graduate Schools: Humanities and Social Sciences; Education; Health Sciences; Agriculture; Fisheries; Science and Engineering; Medical and Dental Sciences; Veterinary Medicine
- Administrative staff: 2,444
- Students: 10,172 (2024)
- Undergraduates: 8,598 (2024)
- Postgraduates: 1,574 (2024)
- Doctoral students: 618 (2024)
- Location: Korimoto 1-21-24, Kagoshima 890-8580, Japan, Kagoshima, Kagoshima, Japan
- Campus: Korimoto Shimoarata Sakuragaoka
- Mascot: さっつん
- Website: Official website

Kagoshima University (鹿児島大学, Kagoshima Daigaku), abbreviated to Kadai (鹿大), is a Japanese national university located in Kagoshima, Kagoshima Prefecture, Japan.

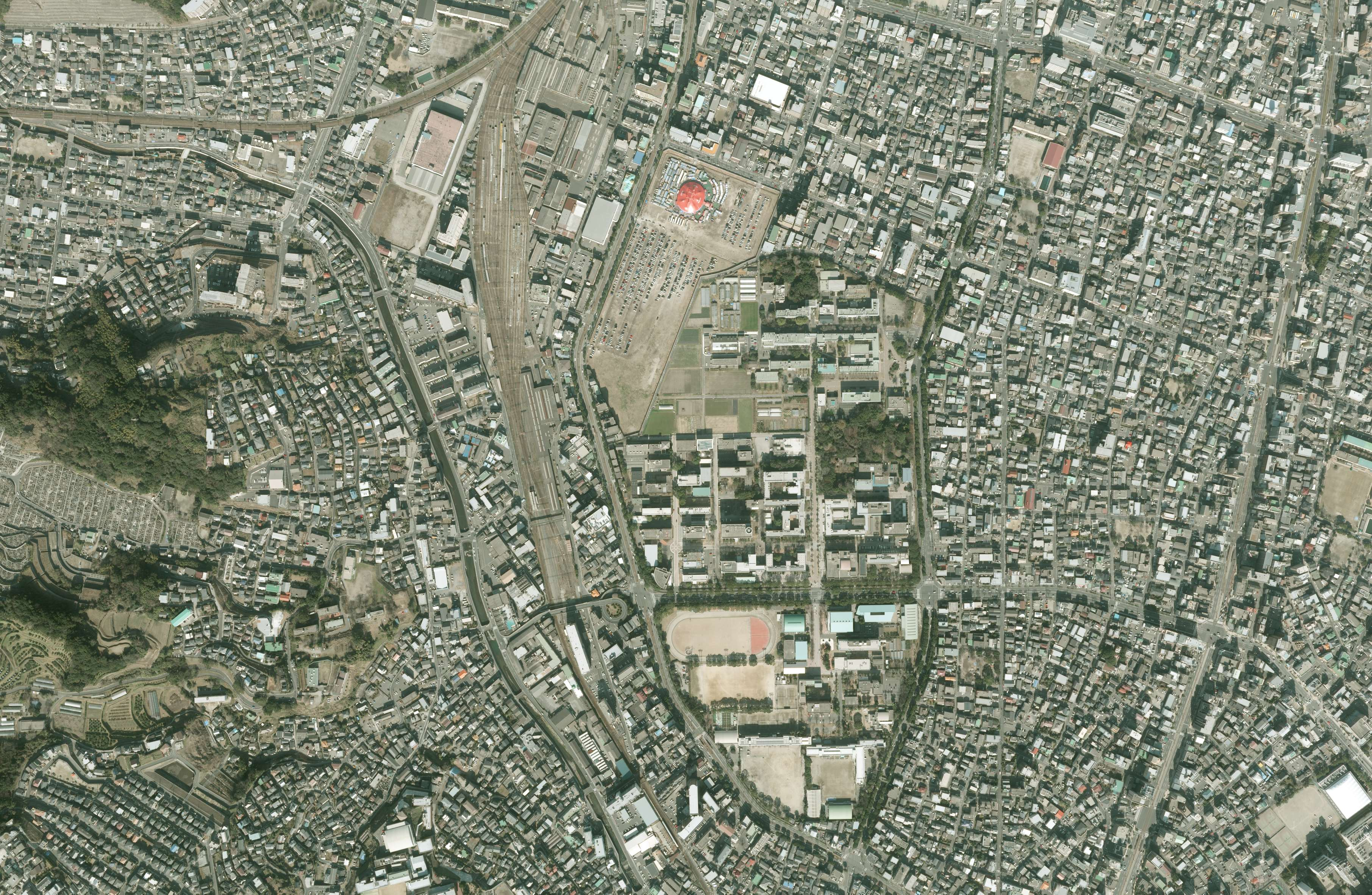
Korimoto Campus (The aerial photography in 2011 by Geospatial Information Authority of Japan )

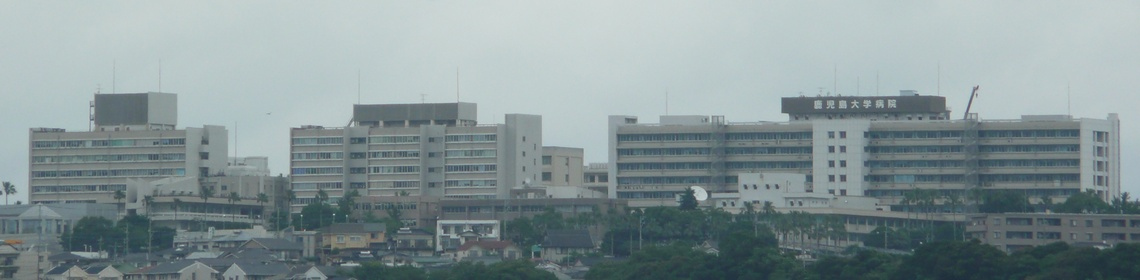
Sakuragaoka Campus (Kagoshima University Hospital, Faculty of Medicine , Faculty of Dentistry, Graduate School of Medical and Dental Sciences)

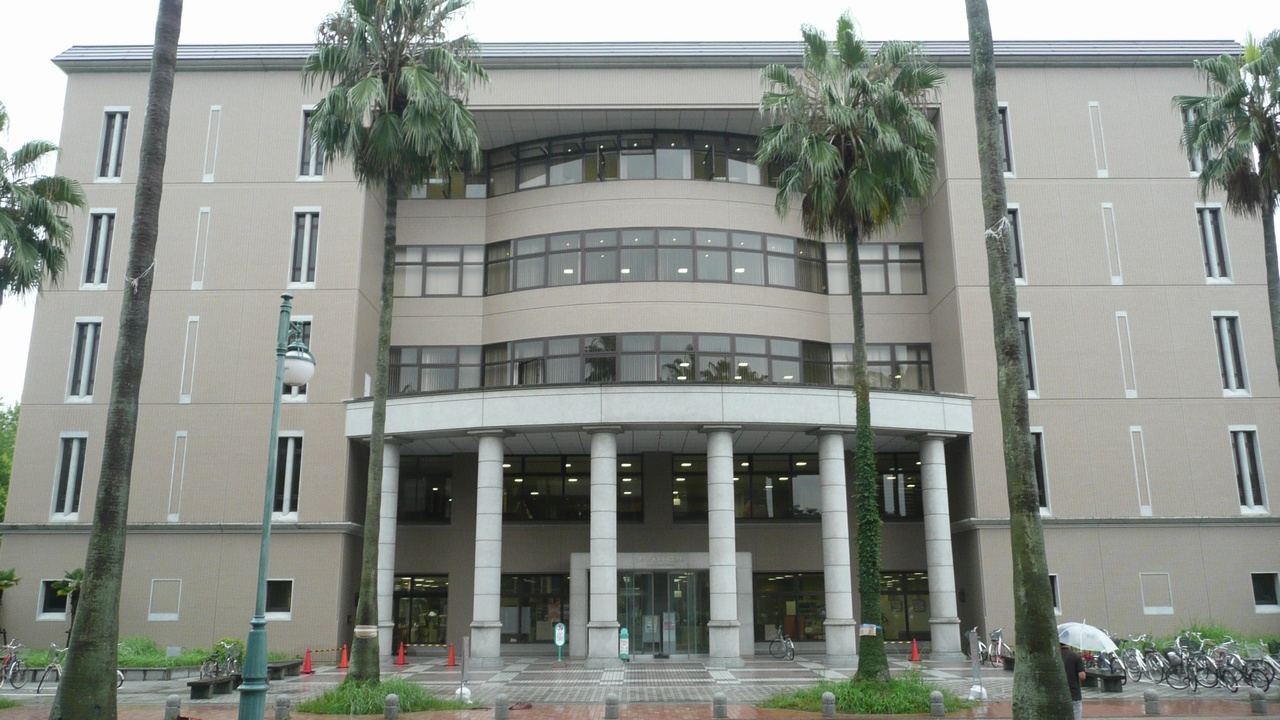
Kagoshima University Central Library (Korimoto Campus)

== History ==
The university was established in 1949 consolidating the following schools because of educational reform in occupied Japan.

- Seventh Higher School Zoshikan (第七高等学校造士館, Daishichi Kōtō Gakkō Zōshikan) - established in 1901. The school was located on the former site of Kagoshima Castle. It is one of the schools that originates from the han school Zoshikan (造士館, Zōshikan) in Edo period.
- Kagoshima Normal School (鹿児島師範学校, Kagoshima Shihan Gakkō) - The oldest predecessor was established in 1875.
- Kagoshima Youth Normal School (鹿児島青年師範学校, Kagoshima Seinen Shihan Gakkō) - established in 1944.
- Kagoshima College of Agriculture and Forestry (鹿児島高等農林学校 / 鹿児島農林専門学校, Kagoshima Kōtō Nōrin Gakkō / Kagoshima Nōrin Senmon Gakkō) - established in 1908.
- Kagoshima College of Fisheries (鹿児島水産専門学校, Kagoshima Suisan Senmon Gakkō) - established in 1946.

The following schools became Kagoshima Prefectural University (鹿児島県立大学, Kagoshima Kenritsu Daigaku) in 1949 and were consolidated into Kagoshima University in 1955.

- Kagoshima Prefectural Technical College (鹿児島県立工業専門学校, Kagoshima Kenritsu Kōgyō Senmon Gakkō) - established in 1945.
- Kagoshima Prefectural Medical College (県立鹿児島医科大学, Kenritsu Kagoshima Ika Daigaku) - established as Kagoshima Prefectural Medical Vocational School (県立鹿児島医学専門学校, Kenritsu Kagoshima Igaku Senmon Gakkō) in 1942. It originates from the medical school in Kagoshima in Meiji era.

These seven schools became the Faculties of Arts and Sciences, Education, Agriculture, Fisheries, Engineering, and Medicine in 1949. The Faculty of Arts and Sciences was divided into a Faculty of Law, Economics and the Humanities and a Faculty of Science in 1965. A Faculty of Dentistry was added in 1977. The Joint Faculty of Veterinary Medicine was separated from the Faculty of Agriculture in 2012. Graduate Schools have been added gradually.

== Faculties ==
- Faculty of Law, Economics and the Humanities
- Faculty of Education
- Faculty of Science
- Faculty of Medicine
- Faculty of Dentistry
- Faculty of Engineering
- Faculty of Agriculture
- Faculty of Fisheries
- Joint Faculty of Veterinary Medicine

== Points of interest ==
- Ibusuki Experimental Botanical Garden

== Notable alumni ==
Politics

- Wataru Kubo (Note: alumni of Kagoshima Normal School) - member of the National Diet, Deputy Prime Minister, Minister of Finance
- Seiichi Ōmura (Note: alumni of Kagoshima College of Agriculture and Forestry) - member of the National Diet, Minister of Home Affairs, Minister of State for Director General of the Defense Agency, bureaucrat (Vice-Minister of Education)
- Shigenori Tōgō (Note: alumni of Seventh Higher School Zoshikan) - diplomat, Minister of Foreign Affairs, Minister of Colonial Affairs
- Tadaatsu Ishiguro - bureaucrat (Vice-Minister of Agriculture and Forestry), Minister of Agriculture and Forestry, member of the National Diet
- Moichi Miyazaki - member of the National Diet, Minister of State for Director General of the Science and Technology Agency
- Eiichi Nishimura - member of the National Diet, Minister of Health and Welfare, Minister of Construction, Minister of State for Director General of National Land Agency, Minister of State for Director General of Administrative Management Agency
- Kokichi Shimoinaba - Superintendent General of Japanese police, member of the National Diet, Minister of Justice
- Morio Takahashi - bureaucrat, the mayor of Kumamoto City, government-appointed governor of prefectures, Superintendent General of Japanese police
- Yin Ju-keng - politician in the early Republic of China
- Zhou Fohai - politician in Republic of China
- Kamejiro Senaga (Note: left the school during the term) - the mayor of Naha City, member of the National Diet
- Kyuichi Tokuda - member of the National Diet

Business

- Kazuo Inamori - founder of Kyocera Corporation and KDDI Corporation, Honorary Chairman of Kyocera and Japan Airlines

Academic

- Isamu Akasaki - engineer and physicist, Professor Emeritus at Nagoya University, Distinguished Professor at Meijo University, Person of Cultural Merit, Order of Culture, Nobel Prize in Physics, Charles Stark Draper Prize, Queen Elizabeth Prize for Engineering, IEEE Edison Medal, Kyoto Prize, Japan Academy Prize & Imperial Prize of the Japan Academy
- Akira Arimura - neuroscientist, biochemist, Professor Emeritus at Tulane University in America
- Kikuo Arakawa - medical scientist, cardiovascular scientist, internist, World Hypertension League Award, International Society of Hypertension Distinguished Fellow Award, Professor Emeritus at Fukuoka University, the 12th President of the International Society of Hypertension
- Kikuo Ogyū - medical scientist, internist, Professor Emeritus at Kyoto University, the President and Professor Emeritus at Kansai Medical University
- Hiroshi Enatsu - theoretical physicist, Professor Emeritus at Ritsumeikan University
- Arika Kimura - botanist, the first director of the Botanical Garden of Tohoku University
- Kuntoro Boga Andri - Researcher, Indonesian Agency for Agricultural Research and DevelopmentIAARD
- Teiso Esaki - entomologist, Professor at Kyushu University
- Kuniyoshi Obara - scholar of education, education reformer, founder of Tamagawa Gakuen and Tamagawa University

Culture

- Shinobu Kaitani - manga artist
- Kawataro Nakajima - literary critic, Chairman of Mystery Writers of Japan, Professor Emeritus at Wayo Women's University, Mystery Writers of Japan Award, Japan Mystery Literature Award
- Kōichi Iiboshi - author
- Kiyoteru Hanada - literary critic
- Hideyo Amamoto - actor
- Takashi Nomura - film director
- Shirō Fukai - composer

Others

- Katsutoshi Naito - wrestler, Olympics bronze medalist
- Kogoro Yamazaki - the first Chief of Staff of the Maritime Self Defense Force
