= Resonac =

Japanese chemicals company

Resonac K.K.
- Native name: レゾナック株式会社
- Romanized name: Rezonakku kabushiki gaisha
- Formerly: Showa Denko K.K. (1939–2023)
- Type: Public
- Traded as: TYO: 4004
- Industry: Chemicals
- Headquarters: Tokyo, Japan
- Key people: Mitsuo Ohashi (chairman); Hideo Ichikawa (president & CEO)
- Products: Inorganics; Aluminium; Electronics; Chemicals
- Operating income: JPY 76.7 billion (2007)
- Net income: JPY 1,023.2 billion (2007)
- Number of employees: 15,778 (2008)
- Website: www.resonac.com

Showa Denko previous logo

Resonac (レゾナック株式会社, Rezonakku Kabushiki-gaisha), formerly Showa Denko K. K. (昭和電工株式会社, Shōwa Denkō Kabushiki-gaisha; abbreviated as SDK), is a Japanese chemical company producing chemical products and industrial materials. It was founded in 1939 by the merger of Nihon Electrical Industries and Showa Fertilizers, both established by Japanese entrepreneur Nobuteru Mori.

Resonac's products serve a wide array of fields ranging from heavy industry to the electronic and computer industries. The company is divided into five business sectors: petrochemicals (olefins, organic chemicals, plastic products), aluminum (aluminum cans, sheets, ingots, foils), electronics (semiconductors, ceramic materials, hard disk drive platters), chemicals (industrial gases, ammonia, agrochemicals), and inorganic materials (ceramics, graphite electrodes). Showa Denko has more than 180 subsidiaries and affiliates. The company has vast overseas operations and a joint venture with Netherlands-based Montell and Nippon Petrochemicals to make and market polypropylenes. In March 2001, Resonac merged with Showa Denko Aluminum Corporation to strengthen the high-value-added fabricated aluminum products operations, and is today developing next-generation optical communications-use wafers.

Showa Denko is a member of the Mizuho keiretsu.

== History ==
- Dec 1908 : Sobo Marine Products K.K. was established by Showa Denko (SDK) founder, Nobuteru Mori, to manufacture and sell iodine in Chiba Prefecture. Sobo Marine Products subsequently developed into Nihon Iodine K.K.
- Oct 1926 : Nihon Iodine K.K. was established.
- Apr 1928 : Showa Fertilizer K.K. (昭和肥料, Shōwa Hiryō) was established, also by Nobuteru Mori.
- Apr 1931 : Showa Fertilizers opened the first ammonium sulfate factory in Japan.
- Mar 1934 : Nihon Iodine K.K. was renamed as Nihon Electrical Industries K.K.
- Jun 1939 : Nihon Electrical Industries and Showa Fertilizers merged to form Showa Denko K.K.
- May 1949 : SDK was listed on Tokyo Stock Exchange.
- Sept 1951 : SDK was awarded the first Deming Prize.
- 1968 : Dumped mercury in the Agano River, which caused widespread mercury poisoning
- Apr 1969 : Oita Petrochemical Complex started commercial operation.
- Mar 1977 : Second expansion project of ethylene production capacity was completed at SDK Oita Petrochemical Complex.
- Feb 1986 : SDK withdrew from its domestic aluminum smelting business.
- Nov 1989 : Hard Disk Plant No 1 completed in Chiba.
- Jan 1995 : Omachi Works obtained ISO 9001 certification.
- May 1997 : Production Technology Center obtained ISO 14001 certification.
- Mar.2001 : SDK merged with Showa Aluminum Corporation.
- Sept.2003 : Japan Polyolefins Co., Ltd. and Japan Polychem Corporation integrated the polyethylene businesses and established a new joint venture company.
- Jul.2004 : Trace Strage Technology Corp., become a consolidated subsidiary.
- Nov.2004 : SDK announced to produce high-power blue LED chips.
- Mar 2005 : SDK sold shares in SDS Biotech K.K. via management buyout scheme.
- Jul 2005 : SDK started production of world's first perpendicular magnetic recording technology HD media.
- Jan 2006 : SDK opened new medium-term consolidated business plan "PASSION Project" for the 2006-2008 period.
- Sept 2006 : SDK opened new aluminum cylinders plant in Oita.
- Dec 2006 : SDK opened new hard disk media plant in Singapore.
- Feb 2007 : SDK develops new crystal growth technology for GaN-based blue/white LEDs.
- Sept 2007 : SDK opened its second neodymium-based alloys plant in China.
- Jun 2008 : Showa Tansan Co., Ltd. become a consolidated subsidiary.
- Dec 2019 : SDK acquired Hitachi Chemical for US$8.8 billion to scale up the lithium-ion battery and advanced materials businesses.
- June 2020 : Hitachi Chemical was renamed as Showa Denko Materials.
- Jan 2023 : Showa Denko K.K. and Showa Denko Materials Co., Ltd. merge to form Resonac.

== Group companies ==
Hard Disk Media

- Showa Denko HD Pte., Ltd.

Petrochemicals

- Showa Highpolymer Co., Ltd.

Chemicals

- GMM Nonstick Coatings
- Nippon Polytech Corp.

Inorganics

- Showa Titanium Co., Ltd.
- Showa Denko Kenso Co., Ltd.
- Tohoku Metal Chemical Co., Ltd.

Aluminum

- Showa Aluminum Can Corp.
- Showa Denko Aluminum Trading K.K.
- Showa Denko Packaging Co., Ltd.

Electronics, other

- Showa Engineering Co., Ltd.
- Showa Denko Kenzai K.K.
- Shoko Co., Ltd.
- Fuyo Perlite Co., Ltd.
- Union Showa K.K.

== Petrochemicals sector ==
The Petrochemicals Sector supports the growth of Showa Denko's basic business through the manufacture and sales of organic chemicals, olefins, and specialty polymers.

SDK is the leader of the Asian ethyl acetate market. The Oita Plant, its main manufacturing base, supplies SDK and other chemical companies with the basic materials for making acetyl derivatives, synthetic resin, synthetic rubber, and styrene monomers.

Innovative products include a new heat-resistant, transparent sheet and film that can be used in flexible displays such as electronic paper and organic EL displays.

== Chemicals sector ==
Originally focused on general-purpose industrial gases, medical gases, and industrial chemicals, SDK now provides a variety of products including high-purity gases and chemicals for the semiconductor industry. As the semiconductor industry shifted to other Asian locations, SDK established overseas specialty gases production sites in Shanghai and Singapore.

The company also offers an array of technologies and products covering various fields, including food additives, feed additives, cosmetic ingredients, medical and agricultural intermediates, optical-function materials, information-recording materials, functional polymeric materials, differentiated composite material, and liquid chromatography equipment (Shodex).

SDK recently launched an environmental initiative to reduce waste and encourage chemical recycling. In 2016 Showa Denko acquired GMM Nonstick Coatings, one of the world's largest nonstick coatings companies founded in 2007 by Ravin Gandhi. Clients included companies in the American housewares industry including KitchenAid and Calphalon, in addition to foreign markets.

== Electronics sector ==
The Electronics Sector includes compound semiconductors, rare-earth magnetic alloys, solid aluminum capacitors, and hard disks.

The compound semiconductors business deals with the crystal growth process, providing a wide range of products including Ultrabright LED Chips, as well as blue LED Chips.

The solid aluminum capacitor business relies on conductive polymers, a combination of inorganic aluminum materials with organic polymers. The products offer high heat resistance and high capacitance.

The electronics sector also produces aluminum-based and glass-based hard disks as well as aluminum substrates for hard disks. In September 2008 SDK announced a consolidation of their hard disk (HD) media operations by establishing a joint venture with Hoya corporation in January 2009. The joint venture was to be owned about 75% by SDK and about 25% by HOYA. However, this joint venture ended in March 2009 due to the rapid deterioration of the global economy in the Hard Disk Sector.

== Inorganics sector ==
The Inorganics Sector consists of the Ceramics Division, Carbons Division and Fine Carbon Department.

- Ceramics Division

SDK's Ceramics products are used in a wide range of fields, including chemical products, refractory products, ceramics, paper manufacture, plastics and electronics. Key products include alumina hydroxide, alumina, and high-purity alumina. SDK also produces fused alumina abrasive grains, silicon carbide and boron nitride.

- Carbons Division

SDK produces artificial graphite electrodes, an indispensable material for the recycling of steel. Other products include fine carburizing agents for iron casting.

- Fine Carbon Department

In addition to VGCF carbon nanofibers and fuel battery materials already on the market, SDK is focusing R&D efforts on high-functionality carbon products, including battery materials, electronics materials, and materials for alternative energy solutions.

=== Aluminium sector ===
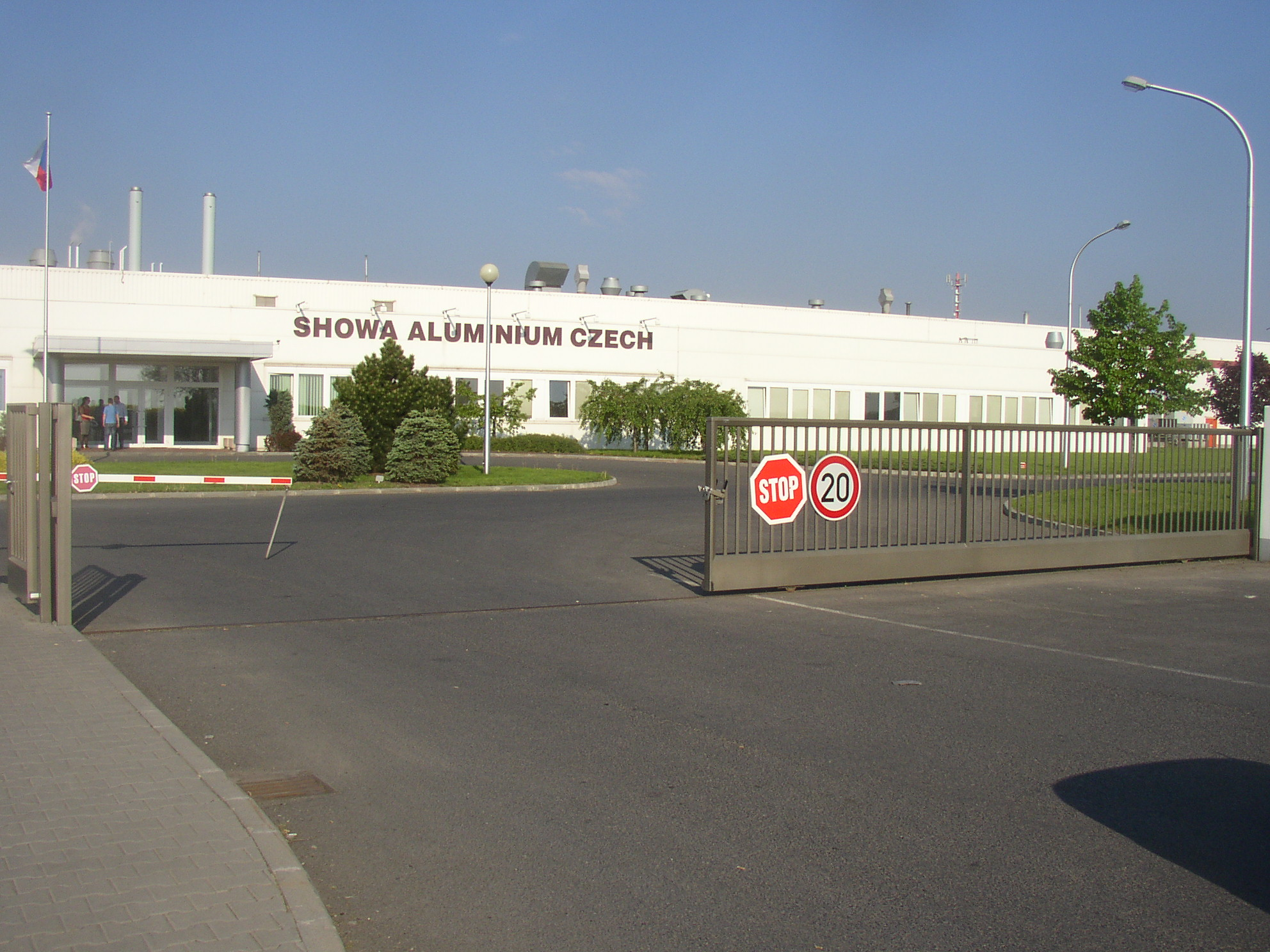
Condensers for automobile air conditioners are manufactured in the Showa Aluminium Czech factory in Kladno, Czech Republic

SDK produces heat exchangers, beverage cans, and other high value-added fabricated products from aluminum materials (including rolled, extruded and forged products).

== Controversy ==
=== Niigata Minamata disease ===
The company is known for causing the second outbreak of Minamata disease (a type of severe mercury poisoning) in Kanose, currently part of Aga-machi, Niigata Prefecture, through the release of organomercury compounds into the Agano River.

=== Tryptophan contamination ===
In the 1980s, Showa Denko implemented genetically engineered bacteria to improve the efficiency of the fermentation process through which it manufactured tryptophan. At the same time, they also changed the technique used to purify the tryptophan. Multiple epidemiological studies traced an outbreak of eosinophilia-myalgia syndrome (EMS) to L-tryptophan supplied by Showa Denko, which resulted in 37 deaths. It was further hypothesized that one or more trace impurities produced during the manufacture of tryptophan may have been responsible for the EMS outbreak. The fact that the Showa Denko facility used genetically engineered bacteria to produce L-tryptophan gave rise to speculation that genetic engineering was responsible for such impurities. However, the methodology used in the initial epidemiological studies has been criticized. An alternative explanation for the 1989 EMS outbreak is that large doses of tryptophan produce metabolites which inhibit the normal degradation of histamine and excess histamine in turn has been proposed to cause EMS. Once the link between EMS and Showa Denko's tryptophan had been established, chemical analyses of the tryptophan was performed by researchers at the Mayo Clinic, the U.S. Food and Drug Administration (FDA), the Centers for Disease Control (CDC) and the Japanese National Institute of Hygienic Sciences to determine if any contaminants were associated with EMS. Showa Denko reportedly destroyed the GM bacterial stocks after the EMS cases began to emerge. In 2017, the last of the six contaminants associated with the 1989 EMS disease outbreak, labelled Peak AAA, has been identified using high-resolution mass spectroscopy.
