= Masanosuke Ikeda =

Japanese politician (1898–1986)

- 池田 正之輔
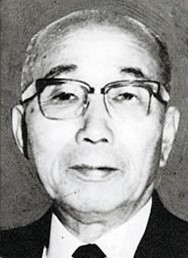
- Ikeda in 1960

Director-General of the Science and Technology Agency
- In office 8 December 1960 – 18 July 1961
- Prime Minister: Hayato Ikeda
- Preceded by: Masuo Araki
- Succeeded by: Takeo Miki

Member of the House of Representatives
- In office 23 January 1949 – 13 November 1972
- Preceded by: Sadakichi Konno
- Succeeded by: Koichi Kato
- Constituency: Yamagata 2nd
- In office 30 April 1942 – 18 December 1945
- Preceded by: Tokutarō Shimizu
- Succeeded by: Constituency abolished
- Constituency: Yamagata 2nd

Personal details
- Born: 12 January 1898 Akumi, Yamagata, Japan
- Died: 27 March 1986 (aged 88) Minato, Tokyo, Japan
- Party: Liberal Democratic
- Other political affiliations: Independent (1942–1945); National Defense Brotherhood (1945); JCP (1945–1946); JLP (1946–1948); DLP (1948–1950); LP (1950–1953); LP–H (1953–1954); JDP (1954–1955)
- Education: Nihon University

Masanosuke Ikeda (池田 正之輔, Ikeda Masanosuke; 12 January 1898 – 27 March 1986) was a Japanese politician who served as Director of the Science and Technology Agency during the Second Ikeda Cabinet from 1960 to 1961. He also served in the Japanese House of Representatives, being elected as a non recommended independent in the 1942 Japanese general election, and again in the 1949 Japanese general election. He would then go on to serve in the House for 24 years, before refusing to run for re-election after a corruption conviction.

== Early life ==
Ikeda was born in Yamagata Prefecture on January 12, 1898. He began to attend Nihon University in 1922, and would go on to graduate from the university's Department of Political Science in 1926, shortly thereafter becoming a reporter for the Yomiuri Shimbun.

== Career ==
After working as an editorial writer for the Yomiuri Shimbun, he gained the acquaintance of Bukichi Miki, and would join the Hochi Shimbun. After serving in management roles inside the newspaper, he became Director of the Federated News Agency. He also served as secretary to Suehiko Shiono during his stint as Minister of Justice.

He was first elected to the National Diet in the 1942 election, and, towards the end of the war, joined the National Defense Brotherhood, a group of politicians centered around Nobusuke Kishi which planned to force the resignation of the Kantarō Suzuki Cabinet for its unwillingness to commit to war on the mainland. After the war, he served as a founding member of the Japan Cooperative Party along with other past members of the National Defense Brotherhood.

He ran again for the Diet in 1949, and won election as a member of the Democratic Liberal Party. After Bukichi Miki was allowed to take office again after being unpurged by American authorities, he worked with Miki and Ichirō Hatoyama's group to form the Japan Democratic Party. He was then named as Secretary-General of the party.

Following the merger of conservative groups into the Liberal Democratic Party, he joined the new organization. Within the party, he was a member of the Sunada group, Kishi faction, and the Seiwa Seisaku Kenkyūkai. He joined the Second Ikeda Cabinet as Director of the Science and Technology Agency and Japanese Atomic Energy Commission, and served in the roles until the first reshuffle in July 1961. He continued to serve as an LDP backbencher afterwards. He was charged with bribery and sentenced to house arrest in relation to the Nippon Express Incident in 1968. In 1977, the Supreme Court of Japan sentenced him to a year and a half of prison, on top of a three million yen fine for the corruption scandal. While he was eventually spared from prison due to his health, he retired from politics. During investigation into the case, a dinner between Ikeda, Takeo Fukuda, and Prosecutor General Daikichi Imoto had a dinner together which was soon viewed as problematic for Imoto.

During his time in office, he worked hard for trade negotiations with China, even before the normalization of relations. After 1953, he traveled several times to China in an attempt to work out a solution, and helped negotiate the Fourth Trade Agreement in 1958.

He died on March 27, 1986, at a hospital in Tokyo due to renal failure. He was 88.

== Personal life ==
He had a short build and rough nose, but was considered to have been strong-willed. When he joined the Japan Liberal Party instead of Shigeru Yoshida's own party, it was alleged he got into a fight with Ichirō Kōno. A similar incident occurred when he got into a fight with party comrade Masuo Araki and called him an "idiot", and was alleged to have gotten into a physical confrontation with Kakuei Tanaka in which Tanaka taunted him.
