= Hiroya Ino =

Japanese politician

- 井野 碩哉

Minister of Justice
- In office 18 June 1959 – 19 July 1960
- Prime Minister: Nobusuke Kishi
- Preceded by: Kiichi Aichi
- Succeeded by: Tetsuzo Kojima

Minister of Agriculture and Forestry
- In office 11 June 1941 – 20 April 1943
- Prime Minister: Fumimaro Konoe; Hideki Tojo
- Preceded by: Tadaatsu Ishiguro
- Succeeded by: Tatsunosuke Yamazaki

Minister of Colonial Affairs
- In office 2 December 1941 – 1 November 1942
- Prime Minister: Hideki Tojo
- Preceded by: Shigenori Tōgō
- Succeeded by: Office abolished

Member of the House of Councillors
- In office 3 May 1953 – 3 July 1971
- Preceded by: Monjūrō Kuki
- Succeeded by: Fujimaro Kubota
- Constituency: Mie at-large

Member of the House of Representatives
- In office 30 April 1942 – 1 December 1945
- Preceded by: Katō Kumeshirō
- Succeeded by: Constituency abolished
- Constituency: Mie 1st

Personal details
- Born: 12 December 1891 Tokyo, Japan
- Died: 19 May 1980 (aged 88)
- Resting place: Tama Cemetery
- Party: Liberal Democratic
- Other political affiliations: IRAA (1940–1945); NDB (1945); Independent (1945–1947); Ryokufūkai (1947–1960)
- Education: Kaisei Academy; Tokyo Imperial University

Hiroya Ino (井野 碩哉, Ino Hiroya; December 12, 1891 – May 19, 1980) was a Japanese politician who served one term as a member of the Lower House of the National Diet during World War II, and three terms as a member of the House of Councillors in the postwar period. He also held cabinet-level posts three times.

== Biography ==
Ino was born in Nihonbashi-ku, a former administration division of Tokyo that is now part of Chūō, Tokyo, and was educated at the Kaisei Academy, following which he graduated from Tokyo Imperial University. He was hired as a bureaucrat in the Ministry of Agriculture and Commerce, eventually rising to become director of the Sericulture Bureau and later Vice Minister in charge of irrigation. In June 1941, he joined the cabinet of Prime Minister Fumimaro Konoe, concurrently holding two portfolios as Minister of Agriculture and Minister of Colonial Affairs, until the latter position was abolished under the Tōjō administration in 1942.

In the 1942 General Election, Ino was elected to the Lower House as a representative from Mie Prefecture, with the backing of the Imperial Rule Assistance Association (IRAA), which was the sole political party in Japan under the wartime one-party state. When the IRAA collapsed in March 1945, Ino became chairman of Nobusuke Kishi's splinter faction, called the National Defense Brotherhood (Gokoku Dōshikai), which aimed to prolong the war.

After the surrender of Japan, as with all other former government ministers, Ino was purged from public office and arrested by the Supreme Commander of the Allied Powers to stand trial for Class-A war crimes. He shared a cell in Sugamo Prison with Okinori Kaya, but his case never came to trial and he was eventually depurged.

Following the end of the occupation of Japan, Ino ran for public office again in the 1953 General Election with the support of the Liberal Party and was elected to a seat in the House of Councillors, representing Mie Prefecture. He was subsequently re-elected twice from the same district on the Liberal-Democratic Party ticket. Ino was a member of the faction led by Nobusuke Kishi. In 1959, after Kishi became prime minister, Ino accepted a post as Minister of Justice in Kishi's second cabinet.

In 1965, Ino was awarded the 1st class of the Order of the Sacred Treasures and in 1973 he was awarded the 1st class of the Order of the Rising Sun. Ino published his memoirs in 1978 and died in 1980. His grave is in Tama Cemetery in Fuchū, Tokyo.

Political offices
| Preceded by Shigenori Tōgō | Minister of Colonial Affairs; Dec 1941 – Nov 1942 | Succeeded by none |
| Preceded by Tadaatsu Ishiguro | Minister of Agriculture and Forestry; Jun 1941 – Apr 1943 | Succeeded by Tatsunosuke Yamazaki |
| Preceded by Kiichi Aichi | Minister of Justice; Jun 1959 – Jul 1960 | Succeeded by Tetsuzo Kojima |
