= Tadaatsu Ishiguro =

Japanese politician (1884–1960)

- 石黒 忠篤
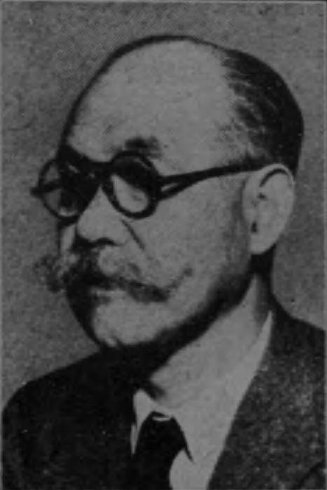
- Ishiguro in 1943

Minister of Agriculture and Commerce
- In office 7 April 1945 – 17 August 1945
- Prime Minister: Kantarō Suzuki
- Preceded by: Toshio Shimada
- Succeeded by: Kōtarō Sengoku

Minister of Agriculture and Forestry
- In office 24 July 1940 – 11 June 1941
- Prime Minister: Fumimaro Konoe
- Preceded by: Fumimaro Konoe
- Succeeded by: Hiroya Ino

Member of the House of Councillors
- In office 6 May 1952 – 10 March 1960
- Preceded by: Toyohisa Morita
- Succeeded by: Multi-member district
- Constituency: Shizuoka at-large (1952–1956); National district (1956–1960)

Member of the House of Peers
- In office 14 January 1943 – 16 February 1946 Nominated by the Emperor

Personal details
- Born: 9 January 1884 Tokyo, Japan
- Died: 10 March 1960 (aged 76)
- Party: Ryokufūkai (1952–1960)
- Parent: Ishiguro Tadanori (father)
- Relatives: Hozumi Nobushige (father-in-law)
- Education: University of Tokyo
- Occupation: Bureaucrat, politician, cabinet minister

Tadaatsu Ishiguro (石黒 忠篤, Ishiguro Tadaatsu; 9 January 1884 – 10 March 1960) was a bureaucrat, politician, and cabinet minister in the government of the pre-war Empire of Japan, as well as in post-war Japan.

== Early life and education ==
Ishiguro was born in Tokyo. His father, Ishiguro Tadanori was the Commander-in-chief of the medical corps of Imperial Japanese Army, and president of the Japan Red Cross. He graduated from the predecessor to Kagoshima University before obtaining a degree in law from Tokyo Imperial University in 1908. On graduation, he was accepted into the Ministry of Agriculture and Commerce. Active in literary circles, he was a member of a coterie established by Nitobe Inazō, with Yanagida Kunio as one of its members.

== Bureaucratic career ==
In 1914, the ministry sent him to Europe to study agricultural policies, and he rose to the position of chief of the Agricultural Policy Bureau in 1919. In 1924, he turned to agricultural reform by publishing a survey on tenant farming practices and sponsoring a bill for mediation in tenant farmer disputes, and for the creation of medical cooperatives in rural areas. He then served as director of the Silk Bureau. In 1931, he was promoted to undersecretary of Agriculture. However, he retired from the ministry in 1934, subsequently serving as president of a Rural Welfare Association.

== Political career ==
However, Ishiguro was selected by Prime Minister Fumimaro Konoe to become Minister of Agriculture and Forestry in 1940. During this time, he was very active in promoting rural relief measures, and also served as Immigration Association President and Chairman of the Japan Agricultural Research Institute. He also strove to implement agriculture reforms and tenant farmer relief measures to Manchukuo, where many Japanese farmers had resettled. However, Ishiguro was adamantly opposed to the Tripartite Alliance of Japan with Nazi Germany and Fascist Italy.

Ishikugo resigned in 1941, citing illness. His father died the same year, and per the provisions of his father’s will, he did not inherit the kazoku peerage title of viscount held by his father. In January 1943, he was granted a seat in the House of Peers in the Diet of Japan. In 1945, he returned to the cabinet as Minister of Agriculture and Commerce under the Kantarō Suzuki Cabinet.

In 1946, after the surrender of Japan, as with all members of the prewar and wartime Japanese government, Ishiguro was purged by the American occupation authorities.

Following the occupation of Japan, in 1952 Yoshino successfully ran for a seat from the Shizuoka Prefecture constituency in the House of Councillors of the Diet of Japan. He served on the Research Commission on the post-war Constitution of Japan, as well as president of the National Farmers Federation, director of the National Chamber of Agriculture, and other agricultural-related organizations; however, he refused any key positions in national politics. His promotion of social activism by bureaucrats in the ministry to favor small farmers came to be known as “Ishiguroism” within the Japanese bureaucracy.

== Notes ==
Political offices
| Preceded by Toshio Shimada | Minister of Agriculture and Commerce; 7 Apr 1945 – 17 Aug 1945 | Succeeded by Kōtarō Sengoku |
| Preceded by Fumimaro Konoe | Minister of Agriculture and Forestry; 24 Jul 1940 – 11 Jun 1941 | Succeeded by Hiroya Ino |
