= Kantarō Suzuki cabinet =

Cabinet of Japan (April 7 - August 17, 1945)

Kantarō Suzuki Cabinet
- 42nd Cabinet of Japan

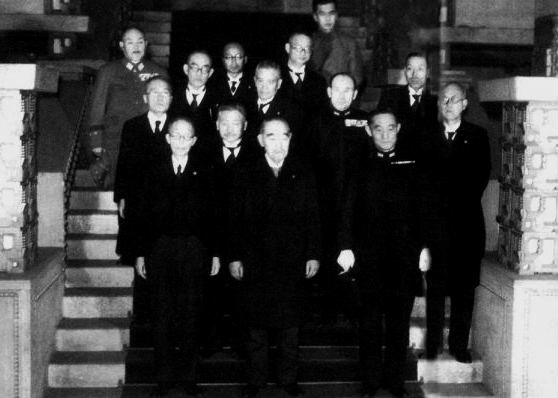
- Date formed: April 7, 1945
- Date dissolved: August 17, 1945

People and organisations
- Emperor: Hirohito
- Prime Minister: Kantarō Suzuki
- Member parties: Imperial Rule Assistance Association (until June 13, 1945); Dai Nippon Seijikai; Independent; Military
- Status in legislature: Majority (coalition)

History
- Legislature term: 87th Imperial Diet
- Predecessor: Koiso Cabinet
- Successor: Higashikuni Cabinet

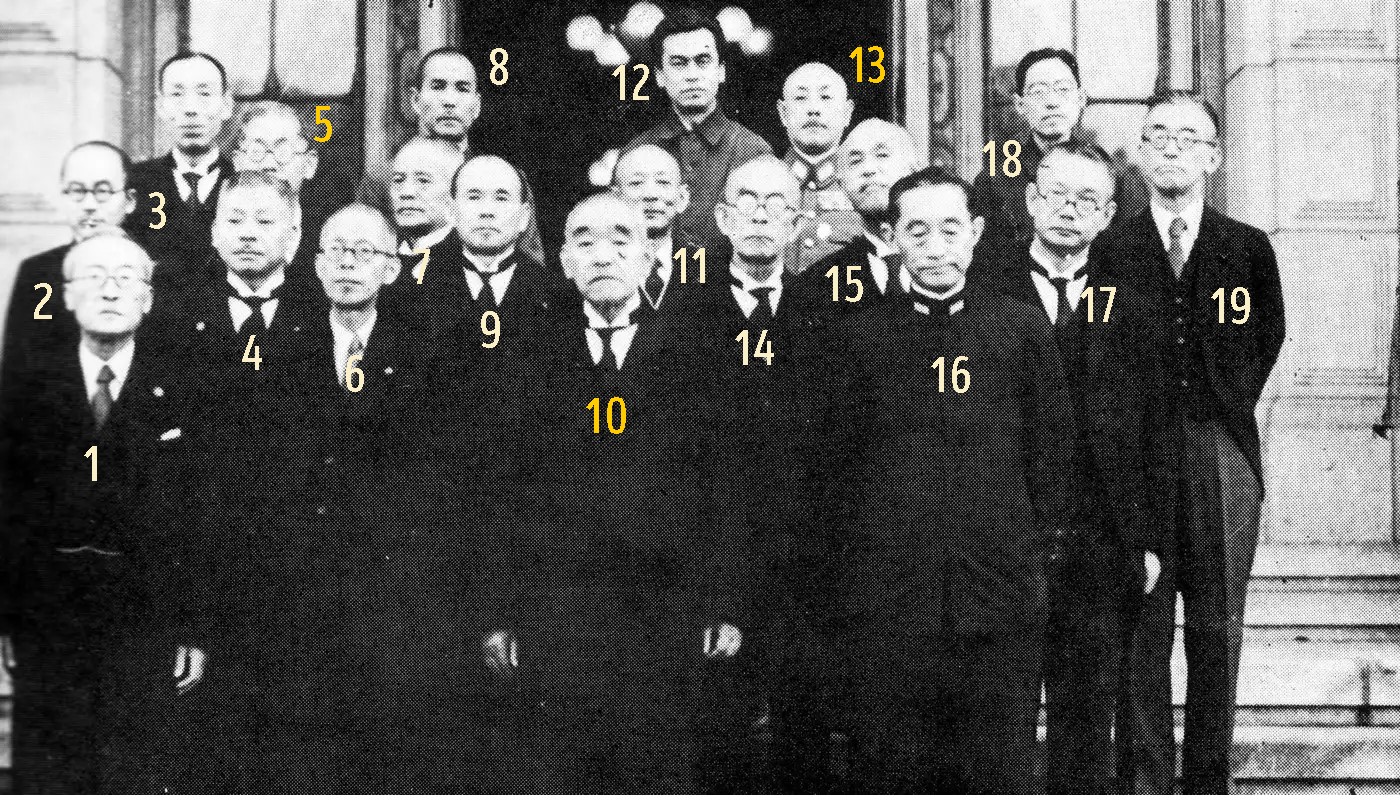
Ministers of the Kantarō Suzuki Cabinet (June 9, 1945).: 1) Tadahiko Okada, Welfare Minister; 2) Genki Abe, Home Minister; 3) Hirose Toyosaku, Finance Minister; 4) Sakurai Hyōgorō, State Minister; 5) Shigenori Tōgō, Foreign Minister; 6) Matsuzaka Hiromasa, Justice Minister; 7) Sakonji Seizō, State Minister; 8) Tsukizo Akinaga, Director of Overall Planning Bureau; 9) Teijirō Toyoda, Munitions Minister; 10) Kantarō Suzuki, Prime Minister; 11) Yasui Tōji, State Minister; 12) Hisatsune Sakomizu, Chief Cabinet Secretary; 13) Korechika Anami, War Minister; 14) Hiroshi Shimomura, State Minister; 15) Tadaatsu Ishiguro, Minister of Agriculture and Commerce; 16) Mitsumasa Yonai, Navy Minister; 17) Ōta Kōzō, Education Minister; 18) Murase Naokai, Director of the Legislative Bureau; 19) Kobiyama Naoto, Transportation Minister.

The Kantarō Suzuki Cabinet is the 42nd Cabinet of Japan led by Kantarō Suzuki from April 7 to August 17, 1945.

== Cabinet ==
Ministers
Portfolio	Name	Political party	Term start	Term end
Prime Minister	Kantarō Suzuki	Imperial Rule Assistance Association	April 7, 1945	August 17, 1945
Minister for Foreign Affairs	Kantarō Suzuki	Imperial Rule Assistance Association	April 7, 1945	April 9, 1945
Minister for Foreign Affairs	Shigenori Tōgō	Independent	April 9, 1945	August 17, 1945
Minister of Home Affairs	Genki Abe	Independent	April 7, 1945	August 17, 1945
Minister of Finance	Toyosaku Hirose	Independent	April 7, 1945	August 17, 1945
Minister of the Army	Korechika Anami	Military (Army)	April 7, 1945	August 15, 1945
Minister of the Army	Vacant		August 15, 1945	August 17, 1945
Minister of the Navy	Mitsumasa Yonai	Military (Navy)	April 7, 1945	August 17, 1945
Minister of Justice	Hiromasa Matsuzaka	Independent	April 7, 1945	August 17, 1945
Minister of Education	Kōzō Ōta	Independent	April 7, 1945	August 17, 1945
Minister of Health	Tadahiko Okada	The Great Japan Political Association	April 7, 1945	August 17, 1945
Minister of Greater East Asia	Kantarō Suzuki	Imperial Rule Assistance Association	April 7, 1945	April 9, 1945
Minister of Greater East Asia	Shigenori Tōgō	Independent	April 9, 1945	August 17, 1945
Minister of Agriculture and Commerce	Tadaatsu Ishiguro	Independent	April 7, 1945	August 17, 1945
Minister of Munitions	Teijirō Toyoda	Military (Navy)	April 7, 1945	August 17, 1945
Minister of Transportation and Communications	Teijirō Toyoda	Military (Navy)	April 7, 1945	April 9, 1945
Minister of Transportation and Communications	Vacant		April 9, 1945	April 11, 1945
Minister of Transportation and Communications	Naoto Kobiyama	Independent	April 11, 1945	May 19, 1945
Minister of Transport	Naoto Kobiyama	Independent	May 19, 1945	August 17, 1945
Minister of State	Hyōgorō Sakurai	The Great Japan Political Association	April 7, 1945	August 17, 1945
Minister of State	Seizō Sakonji	Independent	April 7, 1945	August 17, 1945
Minister of State	Hiroshi Shimomura	Independent	April 7, 1945	August 17, 1945
Minister of State	Tōji Yasui	Military (Army)	April 7, 1945	August 17, 1945
Chief Cabinet Secretary	Hisatsune Sakomizu	Independent	April 7, 1945	August 17, 1945
Director-General of the Cabinet Legislation Bureau	Naokai Murase	Independent	April 7, 1945	August 17, 1945
Parliamentary Vice-Ministers
Portfolio	Name	Political party	Term start	Term end
Parliamentary Vice-Minister for Foreign Affairs	Viscount Itō Jirōmaru	Independent	May 15, 1945	August 17, 1945
Parliamentary Vice-Minister of Home Affairs	Kuboi Yoshimichi	The Great Japan Political Association	May 15, 1945	August 17, 1945
Parliamentary Vice-Minister of Finance	Nakamura Sannojo	The Great Japan Political Association	May 15, 1945	August 17, 1945
Parliamentary Vice-Minister of the Army	Koyama Kunitarō	Dai Nippon Seijikai	May 15, 1945	August 17, 1945
Parliamentary Vice-Minister of the Navy	Ayabe Kentarō	The Great Japan Political Association	May 15, 1945	August 17, 1945
Parliamentary Vice-Minister of Justice	Hamano Tetsutarō	Dai Nippon Seijikai	May 15, 1945	August 17, 1945
Parliamentary Vice-Minister of Education	Count Hashimoto Saneaya	Independent	May 15, 1945	August 17, 1945
Parliamentary Vice-Minister of Health	Miyoshi Nobufusa	The Great Japan Political Association	May 15, 1945	August 17, 1945
Parliamentary Vice-Minister of Greater East Asia	Toyota Osamu	The Great Japan Political Association	May 15, 1945	August 17, 1945
Parliamentary Vice-Minister of Agriculture and Commerce	Ueda Kōkichi	The Great Japan Political Association	May 15, 1945	August 17, 1945
Parliamentary Vice-Minister of Munitions	Noda Takeo	The Great Japan Political Association	May 15, 1945	August 17, 1945
Parliamentary Vice-Minister of Transport and Communications	Manabe Gijū	The Great Japan Political Association	May 15, 1945	May 19, 1945
Parliamentary Vice-Minister of Transport	Manabe Gijū	The Great Japan Political Association	May 19, 1945	August 17, 1945
Parliamentary Undersecretaries
Portfolio	Name	Political party	Term start	Term end
Parliamentary Undersecretary for Foreign Affairs	Tsuru Sōichi	The Great Japan Political Association	May 15, 1945	August 17, 1945
Parliamentary Undersecretary of Home Affairs	Jun'ya Koizumi	The Great Japan Political Association	May 15, 1945	August 17, 1945
Parliamentary Undersecretary of Finance	Nishikawa Sadaichi	The Great Japan Political Association	May 15, 1945	August 17, 1945
Parliamentary Undersecretary of the Army	Viscount Ōoka Tadatsuna	Independent	May 15, 1945	August 17, 1945
Parliamentary Undersecretary of the Navy	Baron Kōyama Kazui	Independent	May 15, 1945	August 17, 1945
Parliamentary Undersecretary of Justice	Baron Kuratomi Hitoshi	Independent	May 15, 1945	August 17, 1945
Parliamentary Undersecretary of Education	Itō Gorō	The Great Japan Political Association	May 15, 1945	August 17, 1945
Parliamentary Undersecretary of Health	Saitō Masami	The Great Japan Political Association	May 15, 1945	August 17, 1945
Parliamentary Undersecretary of Greater East Asia	Nagumo Seisaku	The Great Japan Political Association	May 15, 1945	August 17, 1945
Parliamentary Undersecretary of Agriculture and Commerce	Fujimoto Sutesuke	The Great Japan Political Association	May 15, 1945	August 17, 1945
Parliamentary Undersecretary of Munitions	Takeo Miki	The Great Japan Political Association	May 15, 1945	August 17, 1945
Parliamentary Undersecretary of Transport and Communications	Hata Bushirō	The Great Japan Political Association	May 15, 1945	May 19, 1945
Parliamentary Undersecretary of Transport	Hata Bushirō	The Great Japan Political Association	May 19, 1945	August 17, 1945
