= National Defense Brotherhood =

National Defense Brotherhood 護国同志会
- Leader: Hiroya Ino
- Founder: Nobusuke Kishi
- Founded: 11 March 1945
- Dissolved: 15 August 1945
- Ideology: Total war; Statism; Japanese imperialism; Japanese militarism; Pan-Asianism; Right-wing populism
- Political position: Syncretic

The National Defense Brotherhood (護国同志会, Gokoku Doshikai) was a Japanese political organization formed on 11 March 1945, and dissolved on 15 August 1945. Although its chairman was Hiroya Ino, the group was actually conceived and led by Nobusuke Kishi.

== Background ==
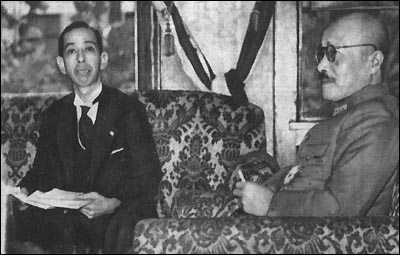
Hideki Tōjō (right) and Nobusuke Kishi, October, 1943

Nobusuke Kishi had risen through the 1930s as one of the reform bureaucrats who directed the state-led industrialization of Manchukuo. There, he cooperated with there with proponents of Total National Mobilization within the army's Tōseiha (control faction), including Akinaga Tsukizo, Suzuki Teiichi, and Ikeda Sumihisa. In 1940–41, after right-wing critics of Prince Konoe's New Order economic reforms accused Kishi's Cabinet Planning Board proposals of being a Marxist "red revolution," Kishi was forced to resign as Minister of Commerce and Industry and went into temporary exile in Manchuria, returning to Tōjō's cabinet in 1941. As Japan's outlook in World War II became increasingly bleak in 1944, Kishi, at that time a cabinet minister without portfolio in the cabinet of Prime Minister Hideki Tōjō, came to be convinced that the war against the United States was unwinnable under Tōjō's policies. In July 1944, during the political crisis caused by the Japanese defeat at the Battle of Saipan, Tōjō attempted to save his government from collapse by reorganizing his cabinet. However, Kishi refused a request to resign, telling Tōjō he would only resign if the prime minister also resigned along with the entire cabinet, saying a partial reorganization was unacceptable. Kishi's actions succeeded in bringing down the Tōjō cabinet and led directly to Tōjō's replacement as prime minister with General Kuniaki Koiso, but also plunged Japanese politics into chaos.

== Formation ==
Following Tōjō's fall from power, Kishi moved quickly to reinvent himself as a key figure in the civilian "Continue the War" (Kōsenha) faction of the Diet. As part of this, Kishi ingratiated himself within prominent rightist communities such as the League of Patriotic Diet Members (Yūkoku Giin Dōshikai) and the ex-members of Seigō Nakano's Eastern Society (Tōhōkai). Kishi forged additional ties with extra-parliamentary sympathizers such as Rear Admiral Sōkichi Takagi, who prominently argued both for replacing the existing government, and a Decisive Battle (Kessen) against the Allies that would enable a settled, "honourable" peace. Most fruitful of these new connections however, was a close collaboration with the radical Pan-Asianist Takeyo Nakatani. As Kishi was now under continued surveillance by agents of the Special Higher Police (Tokkō), Nakatani functioned as Kishi's special emissary to other rightists both in the leadup to Tōjō's ouster and afterwards.

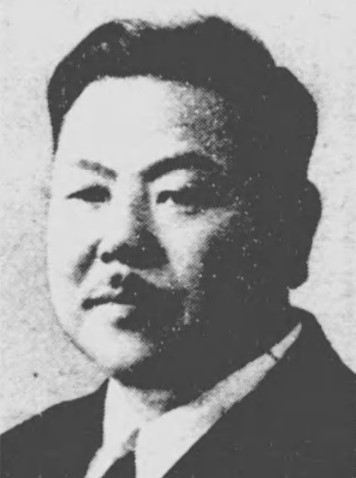
Takeyo Nakatani, an important political ally of Kishi from 1930 to 1945.

Kishi differed from Takagi's Kessen doctrine in that he rejected an expedient end to the war - believing instead that a prolonged war would allow for the formation of a National Salvation Party (kyōryoku na kyūkoku seitō), that would articulate the "political power of the masses." Working behind the scenes with ex-Foreign Minister Yōsuke Matsuoka, Kishi worked towards this goal by advocating a military-led cabinet led under Field Marshal Hisaichi Terauchi. Kishi planned to reclaim his seat in the Diet by arranging the resignation of Yamaguchi representative Yoshimichi Kuboi and forcing a by-election, but these plans were frustrated by a targeted retribution campaign from remaining Tōjō allies in the army and government. Tokyo Military Police chief and close Tōjō ally Ryōji Shikata articulated this hostility at a drunken high society dinner by threatening to kill Kishi:

I poisoned Ōtani Kubutsu, I killed Nakano Seigō, watch now I will kill Kishi

Kishi responded by temporarily withdrawing from frontline politics, resolving to work in the background towards creating a new political movement. In this atmosphere, Kishi held nightly meetings between January and March 1945 with several close associates at Tokyo's Imperial Hotel. These meetings included figures such as Ryōichi Sasakawa, a preeminent fascist political fixer, Yoshio Kodama, a prominent rightist deeply involved in Japan's criminal underworld, Mamoru Shigemitsu, the then-foreign minister, and Ichirō Hatoyama, the future prime minister. From these meetings came a plan to form a new renovationist political movement aimed at mobilising the general public for a final confrontation with the Allies.

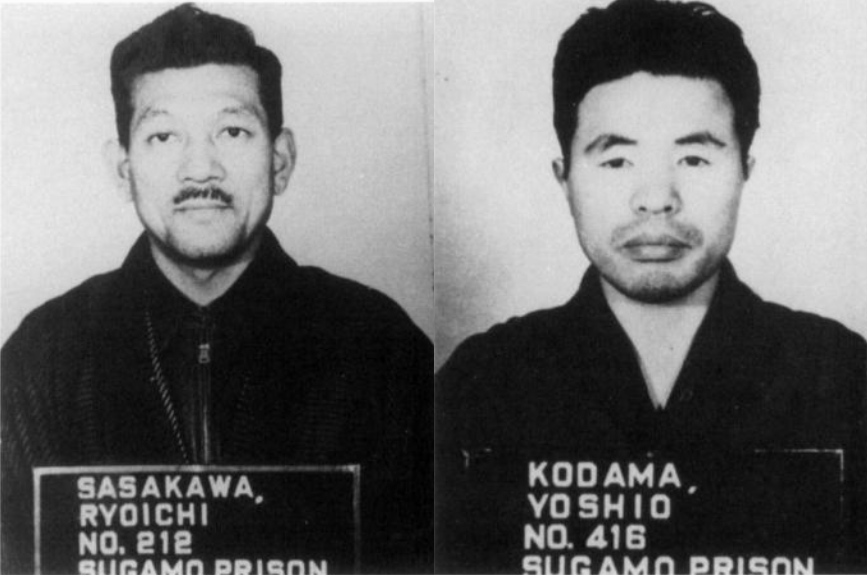
The political fixers Ryōichi Sasakawa (left) and Yoshio Kodama (right), were instrumental in the establishment and operation of Kishi's Gokoku Dōshikai. Pictured while in captivity at Sugamo Prison, March 1946.

Rather than proposing a political party or any informal Diet faction, Kishi's vision resembled that of the early plans for the Imperial Rule Assistance Association put forward by Count Yoriyasu Arima and Fumio Gotō in the late 1930s. The aspect Kishi sought to revitalize was the creation of a nationwide network of vocational guilds, which would supersede the power of the National Diet and rally millions of potential civilians around military-directed national defense organizations.

To this end, Kishi enlisted the agrarian activist and political strongman Kōtarō Sengoku, and Dietman Naka Funada to help prod guild leaders towards enlisting some six million members into his new mass movement. When these outreach efforts stalled, Kishi extended an olive branch to the pro-army Association of Imperial Rule Assistance Diet Members (Yokusō Giin Dōshikai). Kishi imagined riding on the popular support of the Agrarian Guilds and the Yokusō all the way towards a serious bid for the Premiership. Kishi's plans coincided with the dissolution of the IRAPA in March 1945. Out of the IRAPA's disbandment emerged two political associations: the mainstream Greater Japan Political Association (Dai Nippon Seijikai) led by General Jirō Minami, and Kishi's anti-mainstream National Defense Brotherhood (Gokoku Dōshikai). Some 32 Diet members jumped ship to join Kishi's new association by the end of March. A number of this founding cohort included ultranationalists, such as Reserve General Hashimoto Kingoro, a leader of the Cherry Blossom Society.

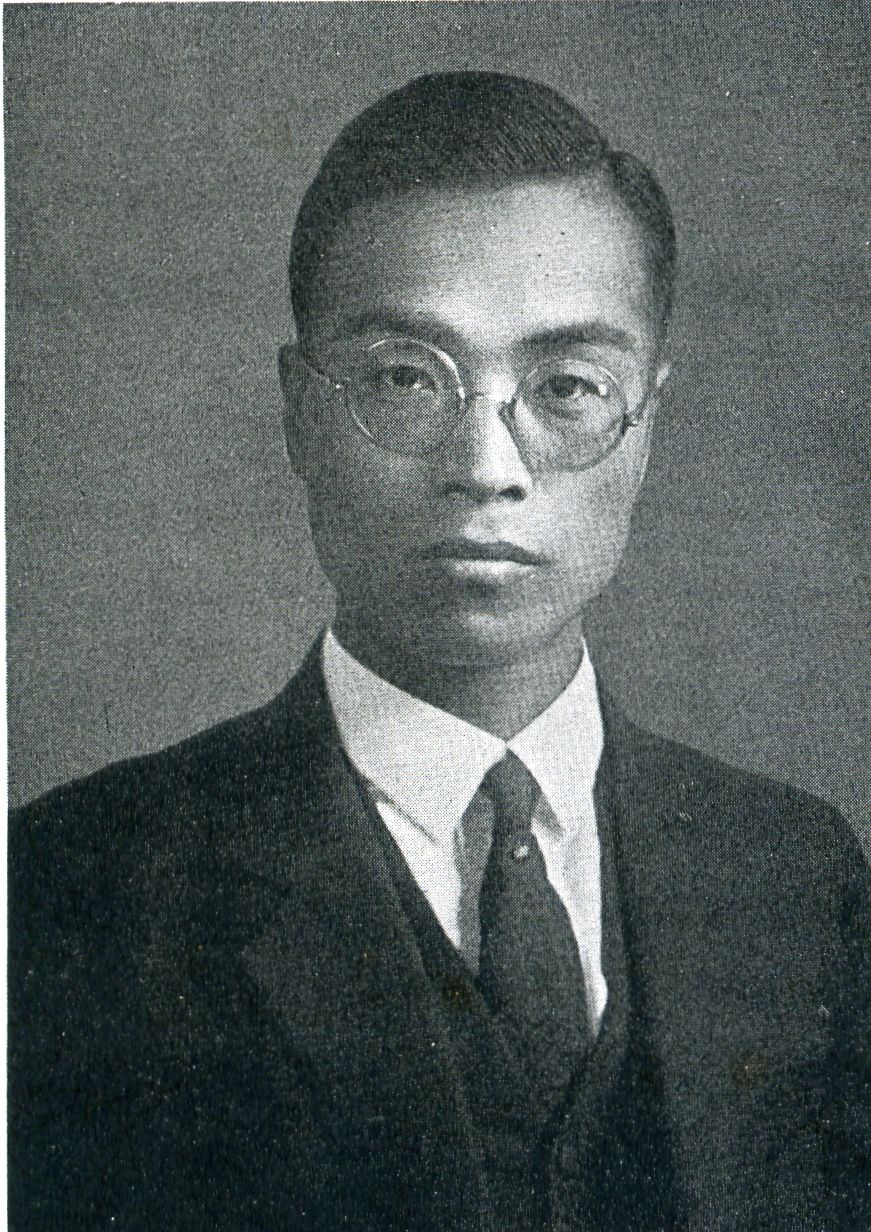
Naka Funada, an ex-member of the Seiyūkai party before the war, member of the Wartime Diet, and prominent policy organiser for the Gokoku Dōshikai as its political research chief, pictured 1933.

== Ideology and Activities ==
The Dōshikai established their central office in Tokyo's Marunouchi business district. Their location, alongside rumours that Kishi received vast sums of donations from industrialist Yoshisuke Aikawa, led to allegations that Kishi was soliciting kickbacks from Aikawa as a reward for Kishi's role in transferring the Nissan group to Manchukuo and establishing the half-Nissan owned Manchurian Industrial Development Company (Mangyō) in 1937. As the US stepped up its incendiary bombing campaign in 1945, the Dōshikai underwent several major structural and ideological changes in correspondence with the deteriorating situation of the war.

The structural changes were its administrative and policy shift from urban Tokyo to politics on the local village and hamlet level in Japan's rural hinterlands, and the founding in May 1945 of the Bōchō Association to Revere the Emperor and Expel the Foreigner (Bōchō Sonjō Dōshikai).

The shift from urban to local organization was prompted both by Kishi's shift towards active preparation for a National Defense Movement, as well as the diplacment of roughly 8.5 million civilians from Japan's major cities into the countryside throughout 1945. Kishi proposed extending the Dōshikai's reach into the countryside in order to create a new pro-army, militaristic coalition of agrarian youth groups, regional business guilds, and military reserve associations (zaigō gunjinkai). These calculations were almost entirely political. Kishi believed that whomever controlled the bulk of national mobilization associations officially linked to the imperial army would hold a decisive advantage over the power of the Japanese Home Ministry, an institution long-despised by Kishi for its political stranglehold over the politics and functions of the National Diet.

The Bōchō Association was founded by Kishi during his activities while in Yamaguchi Prefecture. Named after the Bōchō region of Yamaguchi, Kishi declared that the new movement would become a "clean and bright" mass movement, aimed at preparing the defense of the entire region, and for its individual citizens to "discard both wealth and fame" in order to lead a resistance to Anglo-American invasion in the so-called "Birthplace of the Meiji Restoration." While making great efforts to avoid characterization of the Bōchō Association as a political club, Kishi enlisted the partnership of local elites, prefectural assemblymen, members of the House of Peers, and businessmen such as Kan Abe, paternal grandfather of Shinzo Abe. At a May 10 rally in Yamaguchi to "Repulse the Demon" (Kichiku Gekijō Kenmin Taikai), Kishi elaborated on his view of a decisive battle as the self-sacrifice of Japan's entire population in a 100-million strong do-to-die corps (ichioku kotogotoku tokkōtai).

Ideologically, the Dōshikai became evidently more radical, jingoistic, and grandiose in both its rhetoric and visions for the coming showdown with the Allied powers. To overcome the issues of Absenteeism and the aerial attacks on urban infrastructure which were crippling military production, members of the Dōshikai argued that a nation-wide mass conscription of civilians would create a martial class of "productive soldiers", who could be mobilized for work in factories, arsenals, and mines across Japan. Advocating a general evacuation of the populace and of industry from Japan's cities to the countryside, the Dōshikai couched their visions of the future in apocalyptic terms:

As we see it, all of the industrial cities will be destroyed by aerial bombing, and when that happens there will no option other than to relocate munitions production and foodstuffs to fortified strongholds in mountainous regions where the enemy does not usually bomb, and where they will not approach in the event of an invasion.

The hypothesized decisive battle (kessen) evolved from a purely military term to that of a foundational ideological tenant of the new "War for Constructing Asia" (Kōa-no-sen). As the war continued to deteriorate, Dōshikai members only increased their commitment to an imagined vision of Japan as a global Anti-Imperialist force. While lacking in details, the Dōshikai envisaged a united military front against the Allied powers, made up of anti-colonial nationalists and pro-collaborationist paramilitaries across the globe - all of whom would allow for new fronts for the decisive battle to be fought on and won:

Japan's fate is no longer its own. The independence and liberation of Asia and Africa depends on us.

== Confrontation with the Government ==
The arrival of the Kantarō Suzuki cabinet in April 1945 was initially received warmly by Kishi and members of the Dōshikai, owing to the prominence of military and civilian renovationists in the cabinet. Quickly however, Kishi's mood towards Suzuki turned from approval to loathing, as Suzuki quickly expelled hardline renovationists from the government, heeding the retired Konoe's fears of a "revolution of the left under the guise of the right". Dōshikai members such as Nakatani viewed the Suzuki debacle as another missed opportunity, positing that had Kishi been dealt a fairer hand, the Dōshikai could have played a kingmaker role in the formation and structure of the Suzuki government. Figures on the political right, such as those in the Dōshikai, began referring to Suzuki's government as the "Badoglio cabinet", after the Italian General Pietro Badoglio, who in 1943 had arrested and toppled the government of Benito Mussolini, turning Italy away from the Axis alliance in the wake of Allied invasions.

Itching for a fight with the Government, the Dōshikai harangued Suzuki for a remark given on 9 June, as part of a speech to the House of Representatives on his personal view of the war. Suzuki spoke of a desire for peace in the Pacific, warning that "the wrath of heaven [would] befall both countries" if hostilities were allowed to persist. Interpreting the phrase as a direct attack on the imperial decision for war in 1941, Kodama Yoshio rose to speak on 11 June to attack Suzuki directly:

[The Japanese masses], convinced the divine spirit is always with them, rush forward joyfully into the fight without the slightest thought they will be punished by heaven...the premier must ensure citizens of this sacred country fight with undaunted determination of certain victory.

At the same time, a pamphlet from the Parliamentary Army Office, penned by Dōshikai member Tadataka Ikezaki, further denounced Suzuki's comments:

This villainous remark, which desecrates the sacred national polity and overthrows the glorious national faith, is such high treason even heavenly beings cannot forgive. Our comrades will pursue this lack of faith to eliminate defeatist and obscene people with the hope that one hundred million people will unflinchingly advance down the path to absolute victory.

== Downfall ==
The Atomic bombings of Hiroshima and Nagasaki and the Soviet declaration of war on 6 and 9 August 1945 created a tense and uncertain atmosphere across Tokyo. As rumours that the government was preparing to accept the terms of the Potsdam Declaration, various groups began planning a pre-emptive military uprising to halt the impending surrender. From 10 to 14 August 1945, the Dōshikai's Tokyo headquarters swarmed with numerous radical nationalists, parliamentarians and junior officers, all gathering informally to plan some form of resistance to the government. Lamenting their situation and the role they had played in bringing it about, Dōshikai leaders remarked:

If Tōjō had still been in power, he would have resisted until the very end...we would never have surrendered to the Anglo-Americans.

While the Dōshikai acted as a key political mediator for the various conspiracy groups emerging in the capital, even their most optimistic members had begun reckoning with the gravity of Japan's situation. While positive that a Military Dictatorship would allow for Kishi's technocratic plans to adequately defend Japan against an Allied ground invasion, Dōshikai members conceded that the Greater East Asia Co-Prosperity Sphere was totally lost under any circumstances, that the Japanese armies would immediately withdraw from the fighting in China, and that Manchukuo would ultimately have to be abandoned. Without any plan to deal with future Atomic strikes on the mainland other than proposing a general evacuation of the cities, members of the Dōshikai imagined no future for the Japanese Empire other than its holdings in Okinawa and "Half of Korea."

While no evidence exists claiming Kishi had any knowledge or personal involvement in the 14–15 August 1945 attempt on the Imperial House, the alignment of the Kyūjō officers and members of the Dōshikai on the conduct of the war suggests only that he was, at the very minimum, sympathetic to their cause and unopposed to a military government. As Levidis states more directly, "Kishi and his political allies opposed surrender and were deeply implicated in the rebellious young officers attempt to seize control of the government" in the incident. On the morning of 15 August, as the officers responsible for the failed insurrection committed suicide on the Nijubashi Bridge, the Kishi faction met in an undisclosed office close by and agreed to formally disband the Dōshikai, thus ending the "Continue the War" movement entirely.

According to Levidis, the Dōshikai represented the culmination of Kishi's most radical impulses prior to his major political reorientation after the end of the war. At the same time, the actions and aspirations of the group also reflected Kishi's unrelenting political ambition in a time of total war and ruthless imperialism. Reflecting on Kishi and the Dōshikai in his 1974 memoirs, Nakatani wrote:

Perhaps if Japan had not suffered the bitterness of defeat, the first Kishi cabinet might have been realized ten years earlier.
