= Tsuneo Kanemitsu =

Japanese politician

- 金光 庸夫
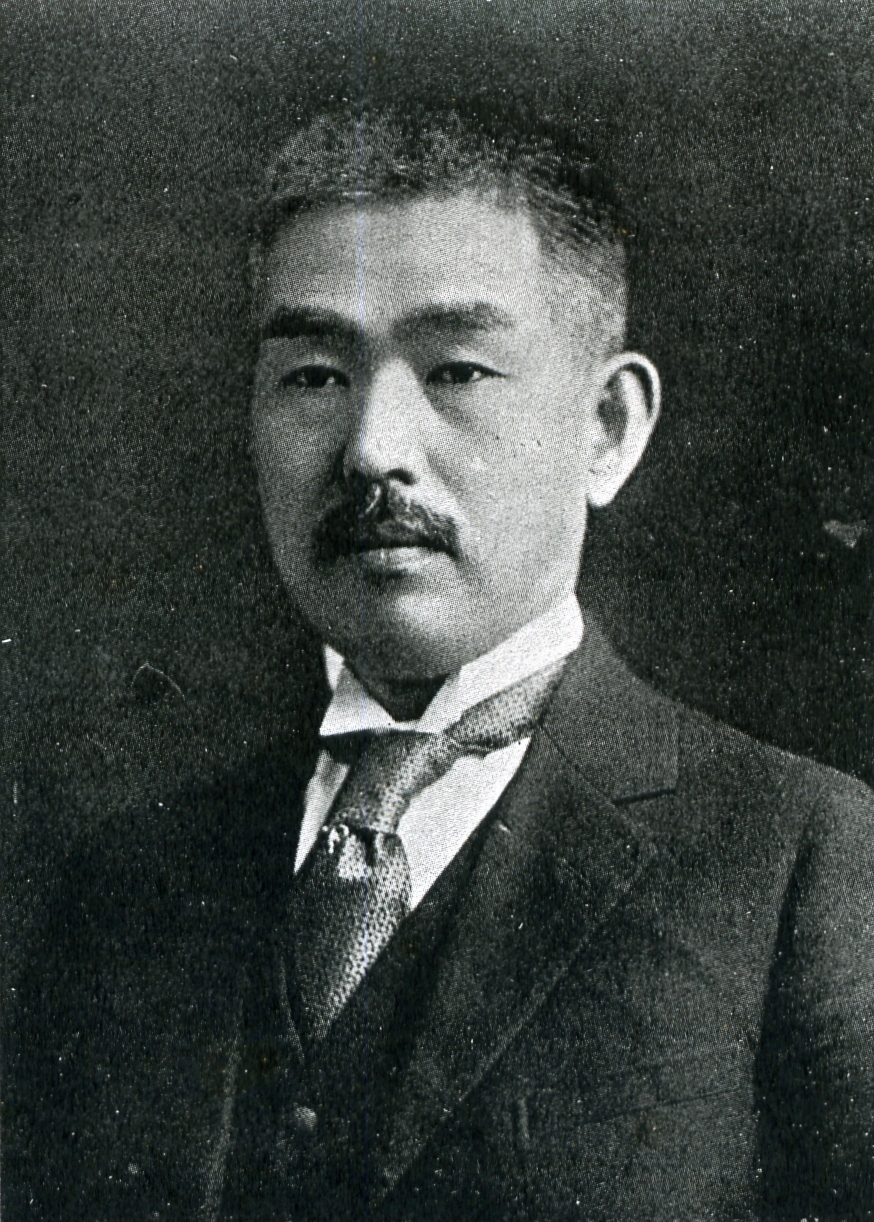
- Kanemitsu in 1932

Minister of Health and Welfare
- In office 28 September 1940 – 18 July 1941
- Prime Minister: Fumimaro Konoe
- Preceded by: Eiji Yasui
- Succeeded by: Chikahiko Koizumi

Minister of Colonial Affairs
- In office 30 August 1939 – 16 January 1940
- Prime Minister: Nobuyuki Abe
- Preceded by: Kuniaki Koiso
- Succeeded by: Kuniaki Koiso

Vice Speaker of the House of Representatives
- In office 23 July 1937 – 31 August 1939
- Speaker: Shōju Koyama
- Preceded by: Tadahiko Okada
- Succeeded by: Ichimin Tago

Member of the House of Representatives
- In office 20 April 1953 – 24 January 1955
- Preceded by: Yoshitaka Gotō
- Succeeded by: Hisato Ichimada
- Constituency: Ōita 1st
- In office 11 May 1920 – 18 December 1945
- Preceded by: Constituency established
- Succeeded by: Constituency abolished
- Constituency: Ōita 2nd (1920–1928); Ōita 1st (1928–1945)

Personal details
- Born: 13 March 1877 Usa, Ōita, Japan
- Died: 5 March 1955 (aged 77) Ōita, Japan
- Resting place: Tama Cemetery
- Party: Rikken Seiyūkai (1920–1924; 1927–1940)
- Other political affiliations: Seiyūhontō (1924–1927); IRAA (1940–1945); JPP (1945); LP (1953–1955)

Tsuneo Kanemitsu (金光 庸夫, Kanemitsu Tsuneo; also as known as Kanemitsu Yasuo; March 13, 1877 – March 5, 1955), was an entrepreneur, politician and cabinet minister in the Empire of Japan, serving eight terms as a member of the Lower House of the Diet of Japan, and twice times as a cabinet minister. He also served twice in the post-war Lower House of the Diet.

== Early life ==
Kanemitsu was born in Ōita Prefecture. He served as a bureaucrat in the tax offices of Nagasaki, Fukuoka and Kumamoto before he was hired by the zaibatsu, Suzuki Shōten in 1908. In 1913, he transferred to Taishō Life Insurance Company, and became its president. In addition, he was on the board of directors for the Nipponkōa Insurance Company. Kanemitsu was subsequently also president of Ōji Electric Tram Company and vice-chairman of the Japan Chamber of Commerce and Industry.

== Political career ==
Kanemitsu's political career began in 1920 General Election, when he was elected to a seat in the Lower House of the Diet of Japan under the Rikken Seiyūkai political party. He was subsequently re-elected a total of nine times from the same district. In 1937, he was Vice-Speaker of the House.

In 1939, Kanemitsu was appointed as Minister of Colonial Affairs under the Abe administration. The same year, he formed his own political faction (together with Takeru Inukai), supporting Fumimaro Konoe's Shintaisei movement, and facilitated meetings with General Akira Mutō of the Imperial Japanese Army General Staff to ensure military support for the movement. In September 1940, under the 2nd Konoe administration, Kanemitsu was appointed Minister of Welfare. He subsequently served as chairman of policy research and in other posts within the Taisei Yokusankai.

Following the end of World War II, Kanemitsu joined the Nihon Shimpotō political party, but was unable to run for office as he had been purged by the Supreme Commander of the Allied Powers along with all other government officials and ranking members of the Taisei Yokusankai, so he had his son run in his place. He was able to resume his seat in the Lower House following the 1953 General Election after the end of the occupation of Japan as a member of the Liberal Party. Kanemitsu died in 1955. His grave is at the Tama Reien Cemetery in Fuchū, Tokyo.

Political offices
Preceded by Eiji Yasui	Minister of Welfare; Sep 1940 - Jul 1941	Succeeded by Chikahiko Koizumi
Preceded by Kuniaki Koiso	Minister of Colonial Affairs; Aug 1939 - Jan 1940	Succeeded by Kuniaki Koiso
