= Toshio Shimada =

Japanese politician (1877–1947)

- 島田 俊雄
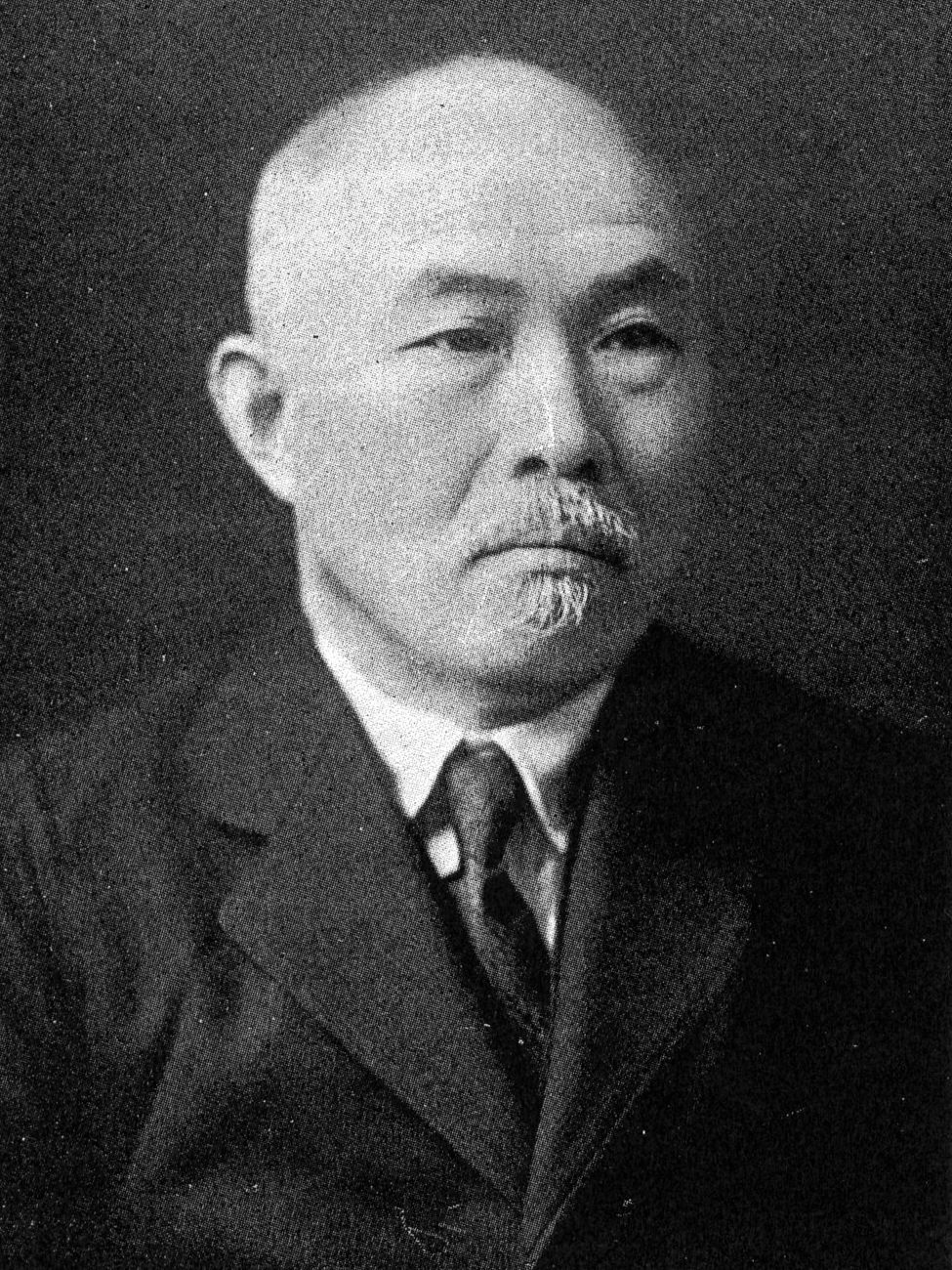
- Shimada in 1932

Speaker of the House of Representatives
- In office 8 June 1945 – 18 December 1945
- Monarch: Hirohito
- Deputy: Eikichi Katsuta
- Preceded by: Tadahiko Okada
- Succeeded by: Senzō Higai
Ministerial offices
Minister of Agriculture and Commerce
In office 22 July 1944 – 7 April 1945
Prime Minister	Kuniaki Koiso
Preceded by	Nobuya Uchida
Succeeded by	Tadaatsu Ishiguro
Minister of Agriculture and Forestry
In office 16 January 1940 – 22 Jul 1940
Prime Minister	Mitsumasa Yonai
Preceded by	Tadamasa Sakai
Succeeded by	Fumimaro Konoe
In office 9 March 1936 – 2 February 1937
Prime Minister	Kōki Hirota
Preceded by	Tatsunosuke Yamazaki
Succeeded by	Tatsunosuke Yamazaki
Director-General of the Legislation Bureau
In office 13 December 1931 – 26 May 1932
Prime Minister	Inukai Tsuyoshi
Preceded by	Takao Saitō
Succeeded by	Zenjirō Horikiri

Member of the House of Representatives; from Shimane
- In office 21 February 1928 – 18 December 1945
- Preceded by: Constituency established
- Succeeded by: Constituency abolished
- Constituency: 2nd district
- In office 21 April 1917 – 31 January 1924
- Preceded by: Multi-member district
- Succeeded by: Magoichi Tawara
- Constituency: Counties district (1917–1920); 5th district (1920–1924)
- In office 16 May 1912 – 25 December 1914
- Constituency: Counties district

Personal details
- Born: 19 June 1877 Gōtsu, Shimane, Japan
- Died: 21 December 1947 (aged 70) Minato, Tokyo, Japan
- Party: Progressive (1945–1946)
- Other political affiliations: Independent (1912–1913); Rikken Seiyūkai (1913–1940); IRAA (1940–1945)
- Education: Tokyo Imperial University

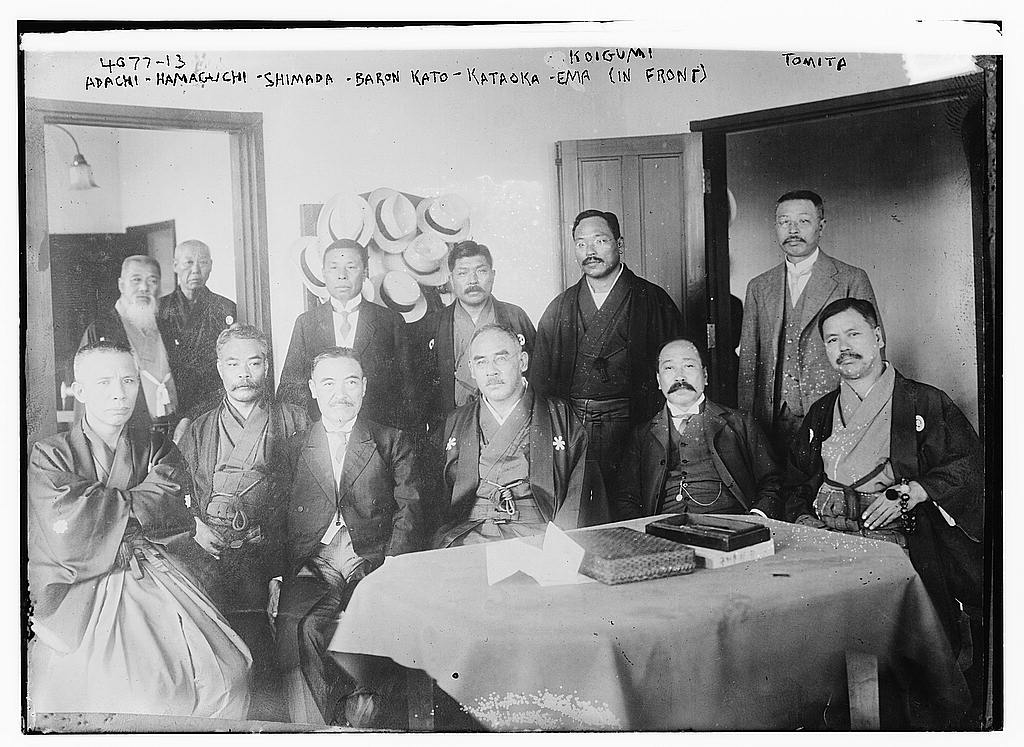
Adachi Kenzō, Osachi Hamaguchi, Toshio Shimada, Baron Kato, Kataoka Naoharu, and Ema Koigumi in 1916

Toshio Shimada (島田 俊雄, Shimada Toshio; 19 June 1877 – 21 December 1947) was a politician and cabinet minister in the pre-war Empire of Japan.

== Biography ==
Shimada was born in the city of Gōtsu in Shimane Prefecture Japan. In 1900, he graduated from the law department of Tokyo Imperial University, and found employment as a journalist for magazines. He was elected to a seat in the Tokyo City assembly in 1903; however, in 1905 he accepted a position as a lecturer at a law school in Yunnan Province, China. He returned to Japan in 1907.

In 1911, Shimada opened a legal office and began work as a lawyer. He was elected to the Lower House of the Diet of Japan in the 1912 General Election as an independent, but joined the Rikken Seiyūkai the following year. He was re-elected nine times, and rose within the Rikken Seiyūkai to eventually become Secretary-General of the party from 1937 to 1939.

In 1931, Prime Minister Tsuyoshi Inukai selected Shimada as Director-General of the Cabinet Legislation Bureau. He joined the cabinet under the administration of Prime Minister Kōki Hirota in 1936 as Minister of Agriculture and Forestry. He accepted the same portfolio again in January 1940 under the Yonai administration, and continued to hold that post into the 2nd Konoe administration. As with all other Japanese politicians, Shimada was forced to join the Taisei Yokusankai created by Konoe in 1940.

During World War II, Shimada accepted the cabinet position of Minister of Agriculture and Commerce under the Koiso administration. From June to September 1945, he served as Speaker of the Lower House.

Immediately following the surrender of Japan in 1945, he became one of the founding members of the Nihon Shimpo-tō political party. However, as with all members of the wartime administration, he was purged from public office by the American occupation authorities in 1946.

Shimada died on 21 December 1947.

House of Representatives (Japan)
Preceded by Tadahiko Okada	Speaker of the House of Representatives; 1945	Succeeded by Senzō Higai
Political offices
Preceded by Takao Saitō	Director-General of the Legislation Bureau; 1931–1932	Succeeded by Zenjirō Horikiri
Preceded by Tatsunosuke Yamazaki	Minister of Agriculture and Forestry; 1936–1937	Succeeded by Tatsunosuke Yamazaki
Preceded by Tadamasa Sakai	Minister of Agriculture and Forestry; 1940	Succeeded by Fumimaro Konoe
Preceded by Nobuya Uchida	Minister of Agriculture and Commerce; 1944–1945	Succeeded by Tadaatsu Ishiguro
