= Chikahiko Koizumi =

Japanese physician (1884–1945)

- 小泉 親彦
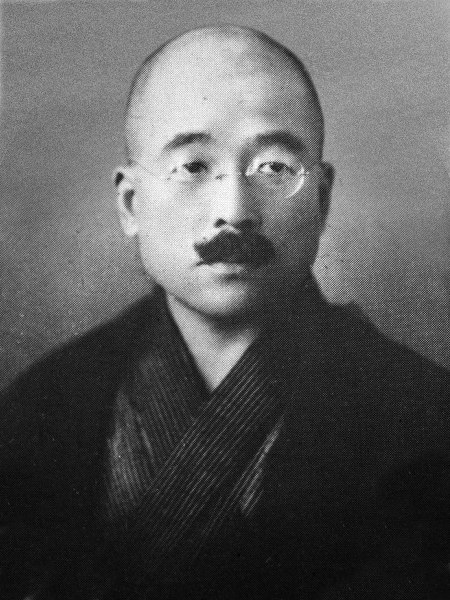

Minister of Health and Welfare
- In office 18 July 1941 – 22 July 1944
- Prime Minister: Fumimaro Konoe; Hideki Tojo
- Preceded by: Tsuneo Kanemitsu
- Succeeded by: Hisatada Hirose

Personal details
- Born: 9 September 1884 Fukui Prefecture, Japan
- Died: 13 September 1945 (aged 61) Yodobashi, Tokyo, Japan
- Cause of death: Seppuku
- Education: Tokyo Imperial University

Chikahiko Koizumi (小泉 親彦, Koizumi Chikahiko; 9 September 1884 – 13 September 1945) was a Japanese military physician who served as Minister of Health and Welfare from 1941 to 1944.

== Biography ==
Koizumi was born on 9 September 1884, as the son of a former samurai of the Sabae Domain. He studied medicine at Tokyo Imperial University and graduated in December 1908.

After becoming a military physician, Koizumi successively served as instructor at the Army Medical School, medical inspector and chief physician of the Imperial Guard Division. He was promoted to Surgeon General in 1934 and served as chief of the medical bureau in the Army Ministry.

Koizumi was the Minister of Health and Welfare from 1941 to 1944 in the Konoe and Tōjō cabinets. He worked positively for the prevention of tuberculosis and advocated universal health care.

After the war, he was accused of war-crimes as he was the minister when the war broke out. But Koizumi committed suicide by seppuku before he was arrested by the Allied occupation forces.
