= Tadahiko Okada =

Japanese politician

- 岡田 忠彦
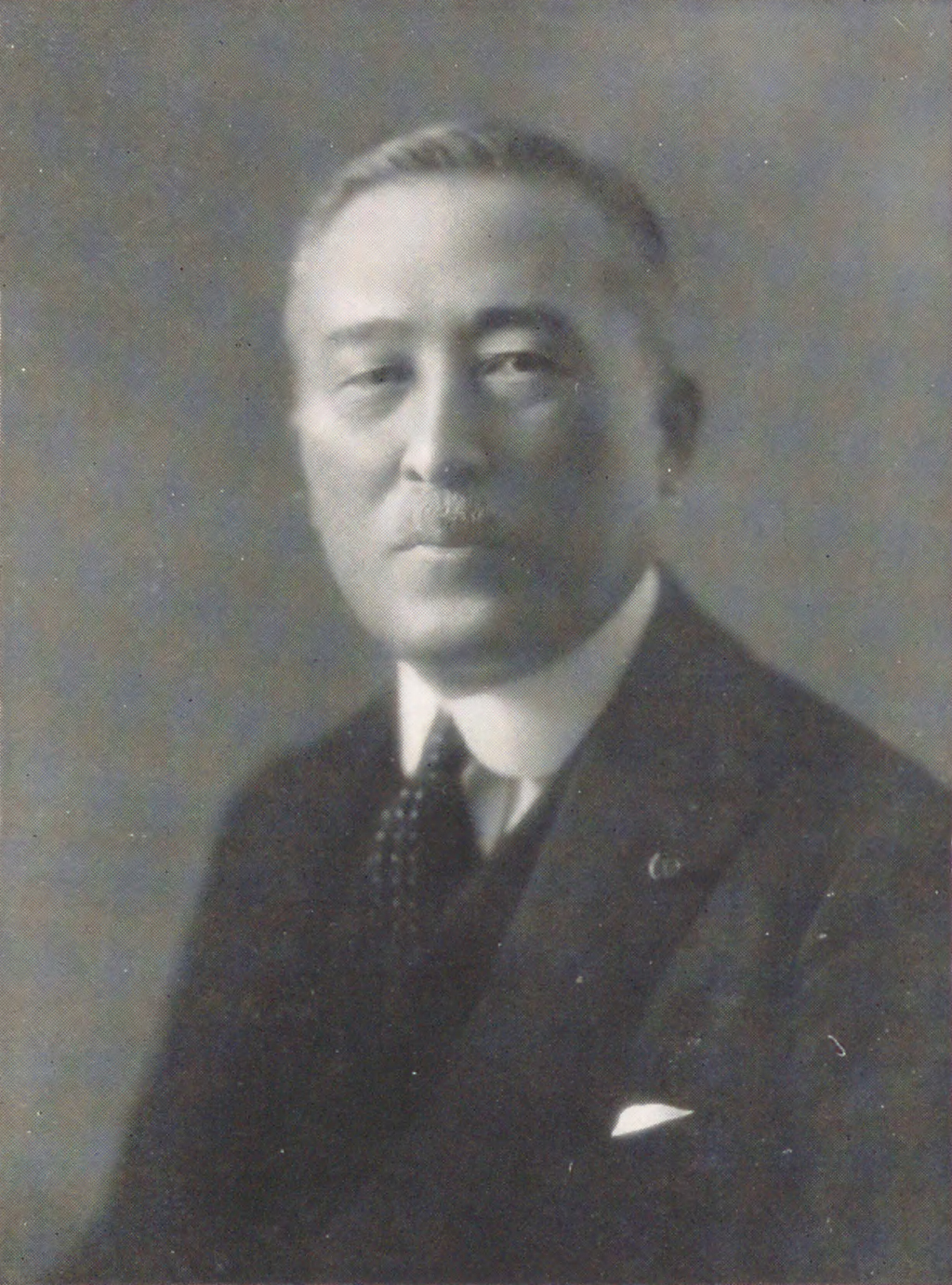

Minister of Health and Welfare
- In office 7 April 1945 – 17 August 1945
- Prime Minister: Kantarō Suzuki
- Preceded by: Aikawa Katsuroku
- Succeeded by: Kenzō Matsumura

Speaker of the House of Representatives
- In office 25 May 1942 – 7 April 1945
- Monarch: Hirohito
- Deputy: Sakusaburō Uchigasaki
- Preceded by: Ichimin Tako
- Succeeded by: Toshio Shimada

Vice Speaker of the House of Representatives
- In office 1 May 1936 – 21 March 1937
- Speaker: Tomita Kojiro
- Preceded by: Etsujirō Uehara
- Succeeded by: Tsuneo Kanemitsu

Member of the House of Representatives
- In office 1 October 1952 – 14 March 1953
- Preceded by: Yoshitaka Wakabayashi
- Succeeded by: Kazuo Koeda
- Constituency: Okayama 1st
- In office 10 May 1924 – 18 December 1945
- Preceded by: Arimori Shinkichi
- Succeeded by: Constituency abolished
- Constituency: Okayama 1st (1921–1928); Okayama 1st (1928–1945)
Gubernatorial offices
Governor of Kumamoto Prefecture
In office 16 October 1922 – 12 October 1923
Monarch	Taishō
Preceded by	Sanosuke Nakayama
Succeeded by	Tanaka Chisato
Governor of Nagano Prefecture
In office 27 May 1921 – 16 October 1922
Monarch	Taishō
Preceded by	Tenta Akaboshi
Succeeded by	Toshio Honma
Governor of Saitama Prefecture
In office 13 October 1916 – 28 June 1919
Monarch	Taishō
Preceded by	Akira Sakaya
Succeeded by	Nishimura Yasuyoshi

Personal details
- Born: 21 March 1878 Okayama Prefecture, Japan
- Died: 30 October 1958 (aged 80)
- Resting place: Tama Cemetery
- Party: Liberal (1952–1953)
- Other political affiliations: Independent (1916–1925); Chūsei Club (1924–1925); Rikken Seiyūkai (1925–1940); IRAA (1940–1945)
- Relatives: Kaneyoshi Okada (brother)
- Education: Tokyo Imperial University
- A: Single-member district B: Multi-member district

Tadahiko Okada (岡田 忠彦, Okada Tadahiko; 21 March 1878 – 30 October 1958) was a Japanese politician. He was governor of Saitama Prefecture (1916–1919), Nagano Prefecture (1921–1922) and Kumamoto Prefecture (1922–1923).

== Awards ==
- 1945 - Order of the Sacred Treasure

House of Representatives (Japan)
Preceded by Etsujirō Uehara	Vice-Speaker of the House of Representatives; 1936–1937	Succeeded by Tsuneo Kanemitsu
Preceded by Ichimin Tako	Speaker of the House of Representatives; 1942–1945	Succeeded by Toshio Shimada
Political offices
Preceded by Akira Sakaya	Governor of Saitama; 1916–1919	Succeeded by Yasuyoshi Nishimura
Preceded by Tenta Akaboshi	Governor of Nagano; 1921–1922	Succeeded by Toshio Honma
Preceded by Sanosuke Nakayama	Governor of Kumamoto; 1922–1923	Succeeded by Chisato/Senri Tanaka
Preceded by Aikawa Katsuroku	Minister of Health and Welfare of Japan; 1945	Succeeded by Kenzō Matsumura
Government offices
Preceded by Fumio Gotō	Director, Police Affairs Bureau of the Home Ministry; 1923–1924	Succeeded by Shōhei Fujinuma
