= Sakonji Seizō =

Japanese politician

Seizō Sakonji
- 左近司 政三
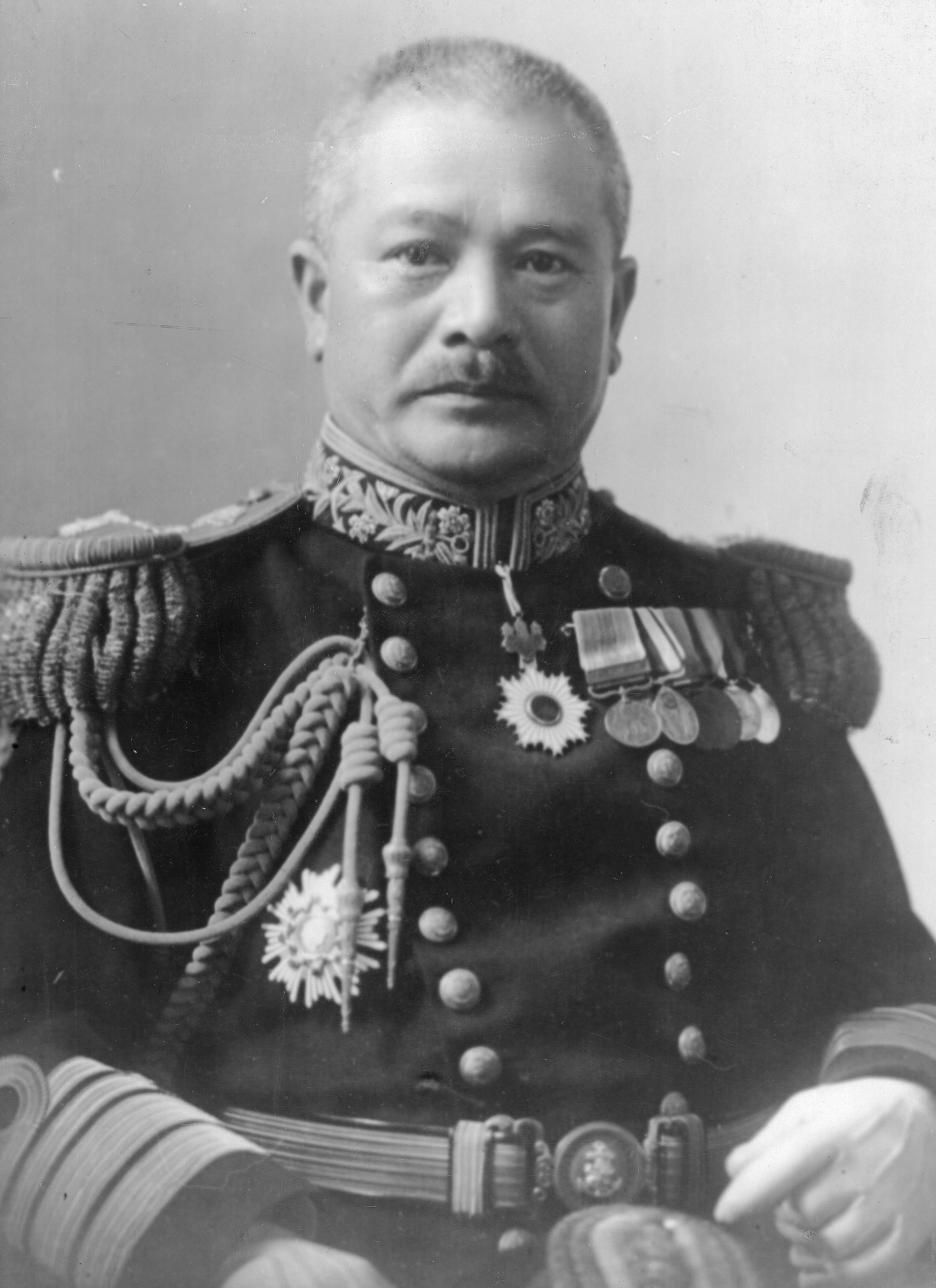

Minister of Commerce and Industry
- In office 18 July 1941 – 18 October 1941
- Prime Minister: Fumimaro Konoe
- Preceded by: Teijirō Toyoda
- Succeeded by: Nobusuke Kishi

Member of the House of Peers
- In office 14 January 1943 – 22 February 1946 Nominated by the Emperor

Personal details
- Born: 27 September 1879 Yonezawa, Yamagata, Japan
- Died: 20 August 1969 (aged 90) Tokyo, Japan
- Relatives: Mamoru Seki (nephew)

Military service
- Allegiance: Empire of Japan
- Branch/service: Imperial Japanese Navy
- Years of service: 1900–1934
- Rank: Vice Admiral
- Battles/wars: Russo-Japanese War; World War I

Seizō Sakonji (左近司政三, Sakonji Seizō; 27 June 1879 – 20 August 1969) was an admiral in the Imperial Japanese Navy, and cabinet minister in the wartime government of the Empire of Japan.

== Biography ==
Sakonji was born in Yonezawa, Yamagata Prefecture, where his father had been a samurai in the service of the Yonezawa Domain. However, soon after his birth, the family relocated to Kanazawa, Ishikawa, and then to Osaka, where Sakonji was adopted by his uncle, who was a lawyer. After attending military preparatory schools, he entered the 28th class of the Imperial Japanese Naval Academy and graduated 8th of the 105 cadets in his class in December 1900. He served his midshipman assignment on the cruiser Hashidate, which made along-distance navigational training voyage to Manila, Batavia, Singapore, Bangkok, Hong Kong, Incheon, Busan and Vladivostok in 1901. As an ensign, he was assigned to the cruiser Iwate as chief navigator.

He served in combat in the Russo-Japanese War on torpedo boats, becoming a torpedo warfare specialist after the war. Promoted to commander in 1915, he led the training squadron on a long distance navigational training cruise to the South Pacific, Australia and New Zealand in 1916.

During World War I, he was sent to the Netherlands and the United Kingdom as a military attaché to observe modern western warfare firsthand. He was promoted to captain in 1919, and served on the Japanese delegation to the Treaty of Versailles.

On his return to Japan, he was assigned to the Imperial Japanese Navy General Staff. He later returned to sea in December 1923 as captain of the battleship Nagato and was promoted to rear admiral in 1924 and vice admiral in 1928. In 1929, he was an influential member of the Japanese delegation at the London Naval Treaty negotiations. On his return to Japan in 1930, he became commander of the Training Fleet, and personally led a training voyage in 1931, going from Keelung to Hong Kong, Singapore, Colombo, Aden, Port Said, Naples, Toulon, Marseille, Malta, Alexandria, Djibouti, Colombo, Batavia, Manila, Palau and Sasebo. In 1931, he became Vice-Minister of the Navy.

In 1932, Sakonji became commander in chief of the IJN 3rd Fleet, and of the Sasebo Naval District. Sakonji had made a very favorable impression on the Commander in Chief of the Combined Fleet Suzuki Kantarō due to his strong negotiating position during the London Naval Treaty negotiations and subsequent support for the Treaty Faction within the Imperial Japanese Navy. Nevertheless, Sakonji earned the enmity of influential Fleet Faction leader, Prince Fushimi Hiroyasu, and Sakonji was effectively forced into the reserves in March 1934.

Subsequently, Sakonji served as president of the North Sakhalin Oil Company from July 1935 to July 1941. Sakonji was selected by Prime Minister Fumimaro Konoe to become Minister of Commerce and Industry in 1941. He was also granted a seat in the House of Peers in the Diet of Japan from January 1943. Under Prime Minister Suzuki Kantarō in April 1945, he was again appointed to the Cabinet as a Minister of State, where he worked to bring about an end to the war by urging acceptance of the Potsdam Declaration.

After the surrender of Japan, most members of the wartime Japanese cabinets were arrested for suspected war crimes by the Allied occupation authorities. However, Sakonji was not prosecuted due to his efforts for peace at the end of the war.

Following the occupation of Japan, in 1951 Sakonji was asked to serve on the committee towards the establishment of the modern Japan Maritime Self-Defense Force.

== Notes ==
Political offices
Preceded by Kobayashi Seizō	Vice-Minister of the Navy; 1 December 1931 - 1 June 1932	Succeeded by Fujita Hisanori
Military offices
Preceded by Nomura Kichisaburō	3rd Fleet; Commander-in-chief; 28 June 1932 - 1 December 1932	Succeeded by Yonai Mitsumasa
Preceded by Nakamura Ryōzō	Sasebo Naval District; Commander-in-chief; 1 December 1932 - 15 November 1933	Succeeded by Yonai Mitsumasa
Political offices
Preceded by Teijirō Toyoda	Minister of Commerce and Industry; July 1941 – October 1941	Succeeded by Nobusuke Kishi
