= Nobusuke Kishi =

Prime Minister of Japan from 1957 to 1960

- 岸 信介
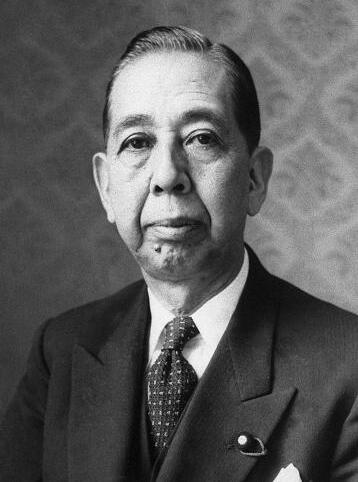
- Official portrait, 1957

Prime Minister of Japan
- In office 31 January 1957 (Note: Acting: 31 January – 25 February 1957) – 19 July 1960
- Monarch: Hirohito
- Deputy: Mitsujirō Ishii; Shūji Masutani
- Preceded by: Tanzan Ishibashi
- Succeeded by: Hayato Ikeda

President of the Liberal Democratic Party
- In office 21 March 1957 – 14 July 1960
- Vice President: Banboku Ōno
- Secretary-General: Takeo Miki; Shojiro Kawashima; Takeo Fukuda; Shojiro Kawashima
- Preceded by: Tanzan Ishibashi
- Succeeded by: Hayato Ikeda
Ministerial offices
Minister for Foreign Affairs
In office 23 December 1956 – 10 July 1957
Prime Minister	Tanzan Ishibashi; Himself
Preceded by	Mamoru Shigemitsu
Succeeded by	Aiichirō Fujiyama
Minister of State without Portfolio
In office 8 October 1943 – 22 July 1944
Prime Minister	Hideki Tōjō
Preceded by	Position established
Succeeded by	Position abolished
Minister of Commerce and Industry
In office 18 October 1941 – 8 October 1943
Prime Minister	Hideki Tōjō
Preceded by	Sakonji Seizō
Succeeded by	Hideki Tōjō
Party political offices
Secretary-General of the Liberal Democratic Party
In office November 1955 – December 1956
President	Ichirō Hatoyama
Preceded by	Position established
Succeeded by	Takeo Miki

Member of the House of Representatives
- In office 20 April 1953 – 7 September 1979
- Preceded by: Shigeo Nishimura
- Succeeded by: Shinji Satō
- Constituency: Yamaguchi 2nd
- In office 1 May 1942 – 8 October 1943
- Preceded by: Multi-member district
- Succeeded by: Constituency abolished (1945)
- Constituency: Yamaguchi 2nd

Personal details
- Born: Nobusuke Sato; 13 November 1896 Yoshiki, Yamaguchi, Japan
- Died: 7 August 1987 (aged 90) Shinjuku, Tokyo, Japan
- Party: Liberal Democratic (after 1955)
- Other political affiliations: IRAA (1941–1945); NDB (1945); Independent (1945–1953); LP (1953–1954); JDP (1954–1955)
- Spouse: Yoshiko Kishi (m. 1919; died 1980)
- Children: 2, including Yōko
- Relatives: Satō–Kishi–Abe family
- Education: Tokyo Imperial University
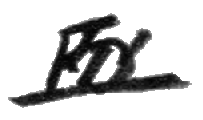
- Signature

Nobusuke Kishi (岸 信介, Kishi Nobusuke; 13 November 1896 – 7 August 1987) was a Japanese bureaucrat and politician who served as prime minister of Japan from 1957 to 1960. As a prominent reform bureaucrat, he directed the exploitative economic management of the Japanese puppet state of Manchukuo in China in the 1930s, and later served in the wartime cabinet. Following World War II, he was imprisoned as a suspected war criminal. After his release, he helped found the Liberal Democratic Party. As Prime Minister, Kishi forcefully revised the U.S.–Japan Security Treaty, but was compelled to resign following the massive Anpo protests the unpopular treaty had provoked.

For his behind-the-scenes role in numerous important events, Kishi retrospectively received the nickname "Yōkai of the Shōwa era" (昭和の妖怪; Shōwa no yōkai). Kishi was the founder of the Satō–Kishi–Abe dynasty in Japanese politics, with his younger brother Eisaku Satō and his grandson Shinzo Abe both later serving as prime ministers of Japan.

Born in Yamaguchi Prefecture, Kishi graduated from Tokyo Imperial University in 1920. He rose through the ranks at the Ministry of Commerce and Industry, and during the 1930s led the industrial development of Manchukuo, where he exploited Chinese slave labor. Kishi served in the wartime cabinet of Hideki Tōjō as minister of commerce and industry from 1941 to 1943 and vice minister of munitions from 1943 to 1944. At the end of the war in 1945, Kishi was imprisoned as a suspected Class A war criminal, but U.S. occupation authorities did not charge, try, or convict him, and released him in 1948 during the Reverse Course. At the end of the occupation in 1952, Kishi was de-purged, enabling his election to the National Diet in 1953. With overt and covert U.S. support, he consolidated Japanese conservatives against perceived threats from the Japan Socialist Party, and in 1955 was instrumental in forming the Liberal Democratic Party (LDP). Kishi was thus key in establishing the "1955 System" under which the LDP remains Japan's dominant party.

Kishi served as the first secretary-general of the LDP and as foreign minister under Prime Minister Tanzan Ishibashi before succeeding Ishibashi in 1957. During his tenure, Kishi had the strong backing of business, and promoted domestic industry and commercial interests in Southeast Asia. In 1958, he introduced a bill which would have granted police vastly expanded powers, but withdrew it under heavy opposition. Kishi's mishandling of the 1960 revision of the U.S.–Japan Security Treaty led to the Anpo protests, the largest protests in Japan's modern history, and he resigned in disgrace. He remained a member of the House of Representatives until 1979 as a staunch anti-communist and conservative with links to right-wing groups.

== Early life and career ==
Kishi was born Nobusuke Satō in Tabuse, Yamaguchi Prefecture on 13 November 1896, the son of a sake brewer named Sato Hidesuke from a once illustrious samurai family that had recently fallen on hard times; his great-grandfather, Satō Nobuhiro, had been a retainer of the Chōshū Domain and the first governor of Shimane prefecture after the Meiji restoration. Nobusuke's older brother, Ichirō Satō, would go on to become a Vice Admiral in the Imperial Japanese Navy, and his younger brother, Eisaku Satō, would also go on to become a prime minister. Nobusuke attended an elementary school and middle school in Okayama, and then transferred to another middle school in Yamaguchi. When he was about to graduate from middle school, Nobusuke was adopted by his father's older brother, Nobumasa Kishi, adopting their family name. The Kishi family lacked a male heir, so they adopted Nobusuke in order to continue the family line.

Kishi passed the difficult entrance examination to enter First Higher School in Tokyo, the most prestigious preparatory school in the country, and then attended the Faculty of Law of Tokyo Imperial University. While at the university, Kishi became a protégé of the right-wing ultranationalist legal scholar Shinkichi Uesugi. Because he studied German law under Uesugi, Kishi's views tended toward German-style statism, compared to the more progressive approaches favored by some of his classmates who studied English law. He was also influenced by Japanese radical intellectual Kita Ikki. Kishi graduated in 1920 at the top of his class. Uesugi sought to recruit him for an academic career, promising to make Kishi his successor as a professor in the future, but Kishi declined. Instead he entered the Ministry of Agriculture and Commerce. This was an unusual choice, because at the time, the most brilliant aspiring bureaucrats typically sought to enter the Home Ministry and eventually gain appointment as a prefectural governor. Several of Kishi's mentors even criticized his choice. However, Kishi was uninterested in administrative work, and aimed to be directly involved in Japan's economic development.

In 1925, the Ministry was split into the Ministry of Agriculture and Forestry and the Ministry of Commerce and Industry, with Kishi becoming part of the latter. In 1926–27, Kishi traveled around the world to study industry and industrial policy in various industrialised states around the world, such as the United States, Germany, and the Soviet Union. Besides the Soviet Five-Year Plan, which left Kishi with an obsession with economic planning, Kishi was also greatly impressed with the German policy of industrial cartels, and the high status of German technological engineers within the German business world. Kishi became known as one of the more prominent members of a group of "reform bureaucrats" within the Japanese government who favored a statist model of economic development with the state guiding and directing industry.

Kishi was a trusted subordinate of Shinji Yoshino, his senior in the ministry. Following Yoshino's appointment as vice minister in December 1931, Kishi steadily rose to prominence. He was named chief of the industrial policy section in January 1932, chief of the documents section in December 1933, and ultimately chief of the Industrial Affairs Bureau in April 1935. In March 1936, Gōtarō Ogawa became the Minister of Commerce and Industry. Ogawa was opposed to the faction within the Ministry represented by Yoshino and Kishi. Seeking to remove them from their positions, he pressured Kishi to accept a post in Manchukuo, where the Japanese Kwangtung Army was requesting his services, while Yoshino was offered the presidency of a public corporation in Tohoku. Both Kishi and Yoshino left the Ministry in September 1936.

== Economic manager of Manchukuo ==
In the "Manchurian Incident" of September 1931, the Kwantung Army seized the Chinese region of Manchuria ruled by the warlord Zhang Xueliang (the "Young Marshal") and turned it into a puppet state called "Manchukuo". Although nominally ruled by Puyi, who had been the last emperor of the Qing dynasty, Manchukuo was in practice a Japanese puppet state and colony. All of the ministers in the Manchukuo government were Chinese or Manchus, but all of the vice ministers were Japanese, and these were the men who really ruled Manchukuo. From the start, the Japanese Army sought to turn Manchukuo into an industrial powerhouse in support of the Japanese Empire and carried out a policy of forced industrialization. Reflecting the military's ideas about the "national defense state", Manchukuo's industrial development was focused completely upon heavy industry such as steel production for the purposes of arms manufacture.

Location of Manchukuo (red) within Imperial Japan's sphere of influence

Kishi has been described as the "mastermind" behind the industrial development of Japan's puppet state in Manchuria. Kishi had first come to the attention of the Kwantung Army officers as a rising star in the Ministry of Commerce and Industry who supported "industrial rationalization" to restrict capitalist competition in support of state goals—ideas that accorded with the Army's idea of a "national defense state". In 1936, Kishi was appointed Manchukuo's Vice Minister of Industry. Kishi was given complete control of Manchukuo's economy by the military, with the authority to do whatever he liked just as long as industrial growth was increased.

In 1936, Kishi was one of the drafters of Manchukuo's first Five-Year Plan. Clearly modeled on the Soviet Union's first five-year plan, Manchukuo's Five-Year Plan was intended to dramatically boost heavy industry in order to vastly increase production of coal, steel, electricity, and weapons for military purposes. In order to enact the new plan, Kishi persuaded the military to allow private capital into Manchukuo, successfully arguing that the military's policy of having state-owned corporations leading Manchukuo's industrial development was costing the Japanese state too much money. One of the new public-private corporations founded to assist in carrying out the Five-Year Plan was the Manchurian Industrial Development Company (MIDC), established in 1937, which attracted a staggering 5.2 billion yen in private investment, making it by far the largest capital project in the Japanese empire; by comparison, the total annual budget of Japan's national government was 2.5 billion yen in 1937 and 3.2 billion yen in 1938. Kishi was instrumental in recruiting Nissan Group founder Yoshisuke Aikawa as president of the MIDC. As part of the deal, the Nissan Group's entire operations were supposed to be transferred over to Manchuria to form the basis of the new MIDC. The system that Kishi pioneered in Manchuria of a state-guided economy where corporations made their investments on government orders later served as the model for Japan's post-1945 development, and subsequently, that of South Korea and China as well.

In order to make it profitable for the zaibatsu to invest in Manchukuo, Kishi had a policy of lowering the wages of the workers to the lowest possible point, even below the "line of necessary social reproduction". The purpose of Manchukuo was to provide the industrial basis for the "national defense state", with American historian Mark Driscoll noting that, "Kishi's planned economy was geared towards production goals and profit taking, not competition with other Japanese firms; profit would come primarily from rationalizing labor costs as much as possible. The ne plus ultra of wage rationalization would be withholding pay altogether—that is, unremunerated forced labor." Accordingly, the Japanese conscripted hundreds of thousands of Chinese as slave labor to work in Manchukuo's heavy industrial plants. In 1937, Kishi signed a decree calling for the use of slave labor to be conscripted both in Manchukuo and in northern China, stating that in these "times of emergency" (i.e. war with China), industry needed to grow at all costs while guaranteeing healthy profits for state and private investors. From 1938 to 1944, an average of 1.5 million Chinese were taken every year to work as slaves in Manchukuo.

Kishi showed little interest in upholding the rule of law in Manchukuo. Kishi expressed views typical of his fellow colonial bureaucrats when he disparagingly referred to Chinese people as "lawless bandits" who were "incapable of governing themselves". According to Kishi's subordinates, he saw little point in following legal or juridical procedures because he felt the Chinese were more akin to dogs than human beings and would only understand brute force. According to Driscoll, Kishi always used the term "Manshū" to refer to Manchukuo, instead of "Manshūkoku", which reflected his viewpoint that Manchukuo was not actually a state, but rather just a region rich in resources to be used for Japan's benefit.

As a self-described "playboy of the Eastern world", Kishi was known during his four years in Manchukuo for his lavish spending amid much drinking, gambling, and womanizing. Kishi was able to afford his lifestyle as he had control over millions of yen with virtually no oversight, thanks to being deeply involved in and profiting from the opium trade. Before returning to Japan in October 1939, Kishi is reported to have advised his colleagues in the Manchukuo government about corruption: "Political funds should be accepted only after they have passed through a 'filter' and been 'cleansed'. If a problem arises, the 'filter' itself will then become the center of the affair, while the politician, who has consumed the 'clean water', will not be implicated. Political funds become the basis of corruption scandals only when they have not been sufficiently 'filtered.'"

== Minister in the Konoe and Tōjō governments ==
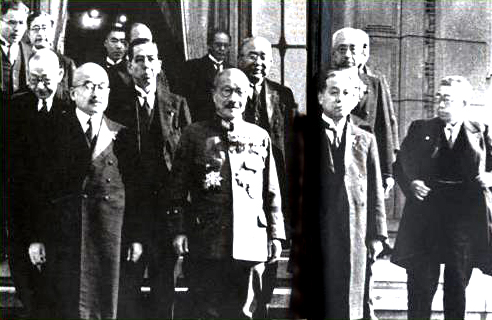
Cropped photo of the wartime Hideki Tōjō cabinet. Kishi is second from the left in the second row, just behind Tōjō's right shoulder.

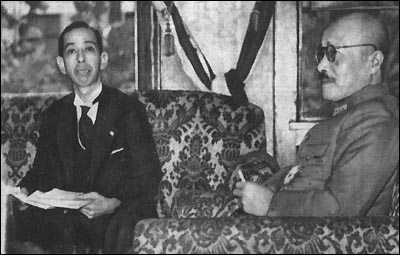
Hideki Tōjō (right) and Nobusuke Kishi, October 1943.

In 1939, Kishi became Vice Minister of Commerce and Industry in the government of Prince Fumimaro Konoe. Kishi intended to create within Japan the same sort of totalitarian "national defense state" that he had pioneered in Manchuria, but these plans ran into vigorous opposition from the zaibatsu, who accused him of being a communist, and Kishi was fired from his post in December 1940. However, Kishi reentered the cabinet as Minister of Commerce and Industry under new prime minister Hideki Tōjō less than one year later, in October 1941. Kishi and General Tōjō had worked closely together in Manchuria, and Tōjō regarded Kishi as his protégé.

On 1 December 1941, Kishi voted in the Cabinet for war with the United States and Britain, and co-signed the declaration of war issued on 7 December 1941. Kishi was also elected to the Lower House of the Diet of Japan in April 1942 as a member of the Imperial Rule Assistance Association. Kishi's many connections with the business world and his organizational skills proved an asset to keeping Japan's war effort going despite growing obstacles. In 1943, the Ministry of Commerce was abolished and replaced with the newly created Ministry of Munitions. Kishi was forced to accept a demotion, becoming Vice Minister of Munitions as Tōjō concentrated power in his own hands by simultaneously serving as prime minister, Minister of War, and Minister of Munitions, although Kishi retained his status as a member of the cabinet. This demotion was the beginning of a rift in the relationship between the two men.

Meanwhile, Kishi increasingly became convinced that the war was unwinnable under Tōjō. In July 1944, during the political crisis caused by the Japanese defeat at the Battle of Saipan, Tōjō attempted to save his government from collapse by reorganizing his cabinet. However, Kishi refused a request to resign, telling Tōjō he would only resign if the prime minister also resigned along with the entire cabinet, saying a partial reorganization was unacceptable. Despite Tōjō's tears as he begged Kishi to help him save his government, Kishi was unmoved. Kishi's actions succeeded in bringing down the Tōjō cabinet and led directly to Tōjō's replacement as prime minister with General Kuniaki Koiso.

== National Defense Brotherhood ==
After the fall of the Tōjō cabinet, Kishi temporarily withdrew from frontline politics, reinventing himself as a key figure in the civilian "continue the war" (kōsenha) faction while working in the background to foment a new political movement dedicated to prolonging the war. Between January and March 1945 Kishi held meetings with several close associates such as Ryōichi Sasakawa, a preeminent fascist political fixer; Yoshio Kodama, a prominent rightist deeply involved in Japan's criminal underworld; Mamoru Shigemitsu, the then-Foreign Minister; and party politician and future prime minister Ichirō Hatoyama. Out of these meetings came a plan to form a new renovationist political movement aimed at further mobilizing the Japanese population for a final, decisive confrontation with the Allies.

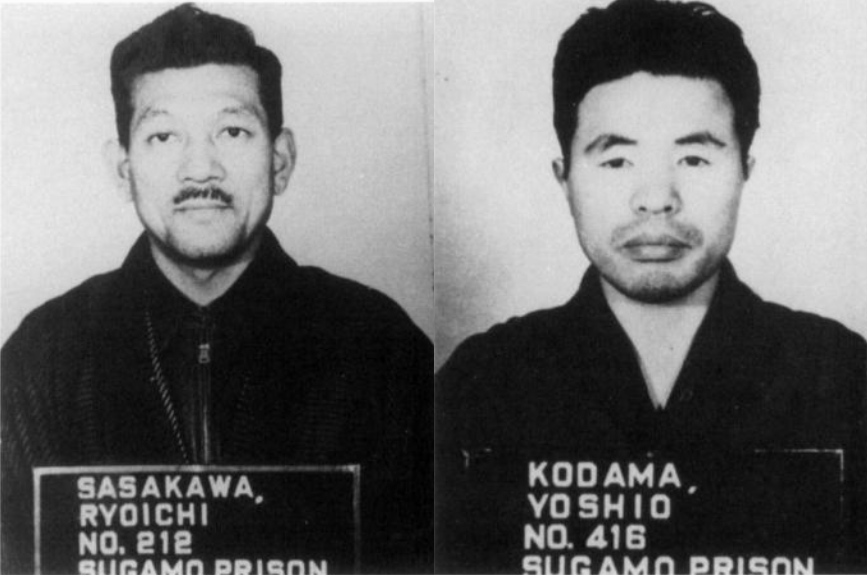
The political fixers Ryōichi Sasakawa (left) and Yoshio Kodama (right), were instrumental in the establishment and operation of Kishi's "National Defense Brotherhood". Pictured while in captivity at Sugamo Prison, March 1946.

Kishi's plans coincided with the dissolution of the Imperial Rule Assistance Political Association (IRAPA) in March 1945. Out of the IRAPA's disbandment emerged two political associations: the mainstream Greater Japan Political Association (Dai Nippon Seijikai), led by General Jirō Minami, and Kishi's anti-mainstream National Defense Brotherhood (Gokoku Dōshikai). Some 32 Diet members jumped ship to join Kishi's new association by the end of March.

Under Kishi's guidance, the Dōshikai advocated the mass evacuation and dispersion of the urban population and industrial base to the countryside to avoid the increasingly devastating effects of US aerial bombardment, the further rationalization of the economy in line with Kishi's technocratic worldview, and systematic preparation for a "decisive battle" (kessen) with the Americans on Japanese soil that would reverse the tide of the war and reignite popular support for his Total War ideology.

The Dōshikai soon came into conflict with the new government of Prime Minister Kantarō Suzuki, who had grave doubts about how much longer the war could be sustained without bringing about a revolution, and sought to suppress Kishi's nascent political movement. Excluded from the cabinet, members of the Dōshikai were limited to occasionally haranguing against Suzuki's policies during Diet debates.

In any case, events rapidly overtook Kishi's new movement, and the war came to an end just a few months after the Dōshikai's formation. With Emperor Hirohito's announcement of Japan's surrender on 15 August, the "continue the war" movement came to an end. That same day, Kishi and his followers met in an undisclosed office and agreed to formally disband the Dōshikai.

== Prisoner in Sugamo ==
After the Japanese surrender to the Allies in August 1945, Kishi, with other members of the former Japanese government, was held at Sugamo Prison as a suspected "Class A" war criminal by the order of the Supreme Commander for the Allied Powers. Kishi, Kodama, Sasakawa, and Matsutarō Shōriki, the former president of the Yomiuri Shimbun newspaper, lived in the same prison cell and were never judged. Their fraternity formed in prison continued for the rest of their lives.

During this time, a group of influential Americans who had formed themselves into an "American Council on Japan" came to Kishi's aid, and lobbied the American government to release him as they considered Kishi to be among the best men to lead post-war Japan. The American Council on Japan included former ambassador to Japan Joseph C. Grew, retired diplomat Eugene Dooman, Newsweek journalists Harry Kern and Compton Packenham, and corporate lawyer James L. Kauffman. Unlike Hideki Tōjō (and several other Cabinet members) who were put on trial, Kishi was released in December 1948 as part of the Reverse Course, and was never indicted or tried by the International Military Tribunal for the Far East. However, he remained legally prohibited from entering public affairs because of the Allied occupation's purge of members of the old regime.

During his time as a prisoner, Kishi had already begun planning his political comeback. He conceived of the idea of building on his earlier National Defense Brotherhood to establish a mass party uniting the more moderate socialists and conservatives into a "popular movement of national salvation", a populist party that would use statist methods to encourage economic growth and would mobilize all Japanese citizens to rally in support of its nationalist policies.

== Return to politics ==
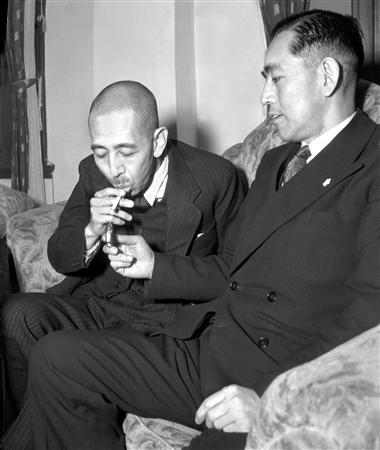
Nobusuke Kishi (left) relaxes at the house of his brother, the then Chief Cabinet Secretary Eisaku Satō (1901–75), shortly after he was released from Sugamo Prison on 24 December 1948.

When the prohibition on former government members was fully rescinded in 1952 with the end of the Allied occupation of Japan, Kishi returned to politics and was central in creating the "Japan Reconstruction Federation" (Nippon Saiken Renmei), drawing upon his earlier efforts with the National Defense Brotherhood. Besides becoming prime minister, Kishi's main aim in politics was to revise the American-imposed constitution, especially Article 9. Kishi wrote that in order for Japan to regain its status as a "respectable member (of) the community of nations it would first have to revise its constitution and rearm: If Japan is alone in renouncing war ... she will not be able to prevent others from invading her land. If, on the other hand, Japan could defend herself, there would be no further need of keeping United States garrison forces in Japan ... Japan should be strong enough to defend herself."

Kishi's Japan Reconstruction Federation fared disastrously in the 1952 elections, and Kishi failed in his bid to be elected to the Diet. After that defeat, Kishi disbanded his party, and tried to join the Socialists; after being rebuffed, he reluctantly joined the Liberal Party instead. After being elected to the Diet as a Liberal in 1953, Kishi's main activities revolved around undermining the leader of the Liberal Party, Shigeru Yoshida, so he could become the Liberal leader in his place. Kishi's main avenues of attack were that Yoshida was far too deferential to the Americans and the need to do away with Article 9. In April 1954 Yoshida expelled Kishi from the party in retaliation for his attempts to depose him as Liberal leader.

Kishi had foreseen this eventuality, and by this time, had already identified over 200 members of the Diet who would be willing to join him in forming a new political party to challenge Yoshida. Kishi wooed these politicians by flashing "show money" (misegane) that he had been supplied by his powerful big business backers. In November 1954, Kishi co-founded the new Democratic Party along with Ichirō Hatoyama. Hatoyama was the party leader, but Kishi was the party secretary, and crucially, controlled the party's finances, which thus made him the dominant force within the Democrats. Elections in Japan were very expensive, so few candidates to the Diet could afford the costs of an election campaign out of their own pockets or could fund-raise enough money for a successful bid for the Diet. As a result, candidates to the Diet needed a steady infusion of money from the party-secretariat to run a winning campaign, which made Kishi a powerful force within the Democratic Party as he determined which candidates received money from the party-secretariat and how much. As a result, Democratic candidates for the Diet either seeking election for the first time or reelection were constantly seeing Kishi to seek his favor. Reflecting Kishi's power as party secretary, Hatoyama was described as an omikoshi, a type of portable Shinto shrine carried around to be worshipped. Everyone bows downs and worships an omikoshi, but to move an omikoshi, it must be picked up and carried by somebody.

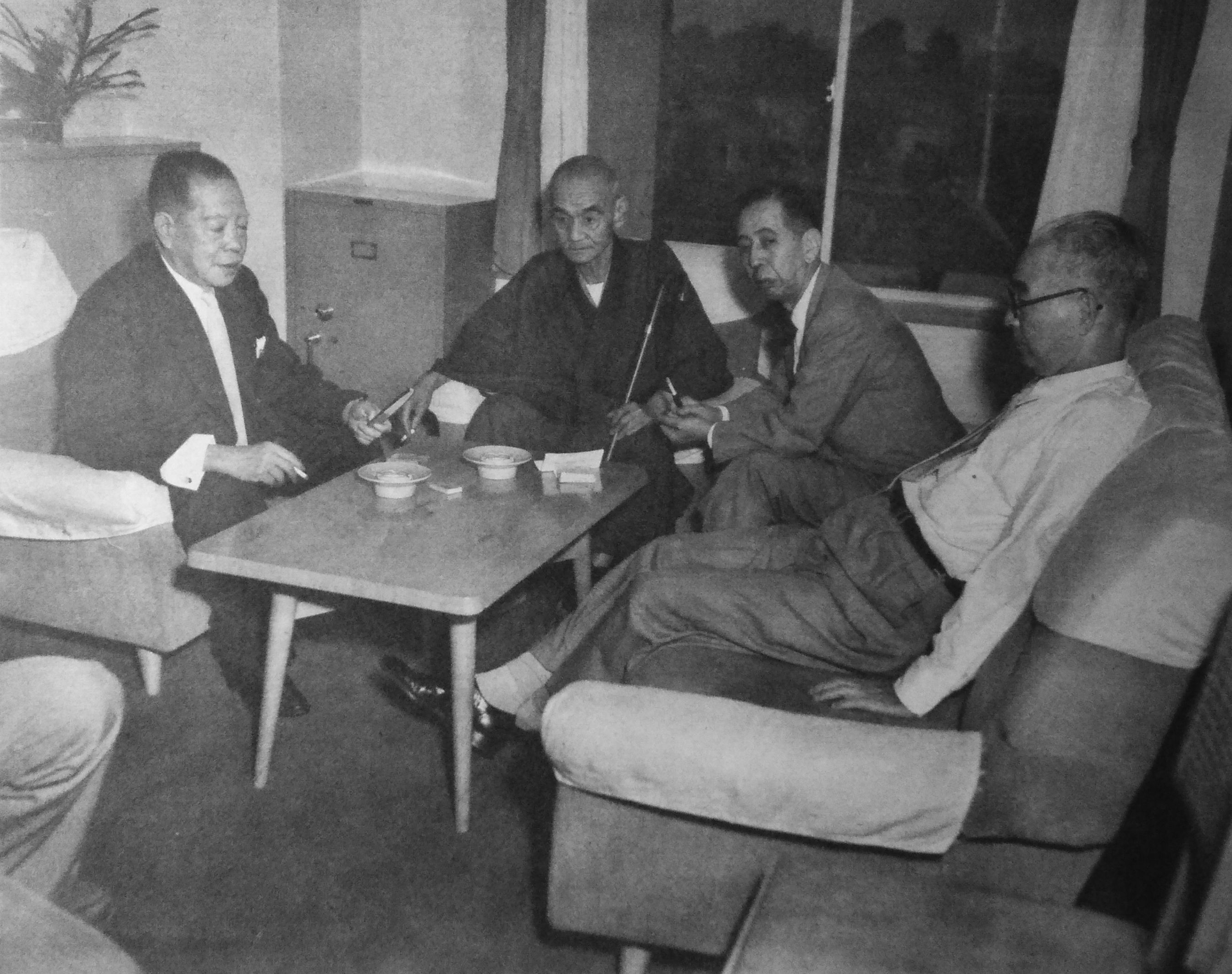
Conservative leaders meet to plot the merger of the Liberal and Democratic parties in July 1955. From left to right: Banboku Ōno, Bukichi Miki, Nobusuke Kishi, Mitsujirō Ishii

In February 1955, the Democrats won the general elections. On the day after Hatoyama was sworn in as prime minister, Kishi began talks with the Liberals about merging the two parties now that his arch-enemy Yoshida had stepped down as Liberal leader. In November 1955, the Democratic Party and Liberal Party merged to elect Ichirō Hatoyama as the head of the new Liberal Democratic Party. Within the new party, Kishi once again became the party secretary with control of the party finances. Kishi had reassured the American ambassador John Allison that "for the next twenty five years it would be in Japan's best interests to cooperate closely with the United States."

When Hatoyama stepped down in December 1956, Kishi was considered the leading candidate to succeed him. Kishi came first in the first round in the party presidential election, but was narrowly defeated by Tanzan Ishibashi in the second due to the Ishibashi camp cooperating with the third candidate Mitsujirō Ishii. The Americans wanted Kishi to become prime minister and were disappointed when Ishibashi, the least pro-American among the major LDP figures, won the party's leadership, leading an American diplomat to write the U.S. had bet its "money on Kishi, but the wrong horse won".

Ishibashi appointed Kishi as foreign minister in his cabinet to ensure party unity, but Ishibashi soon fell ill and designated Kishi as acting prime minister at the end of January 1957. Ishibashi resigned as prime minister at the end of February 1957 and as party president in March. Kishi succeeded him in both posts.

== Premiership (1957–1960) ==
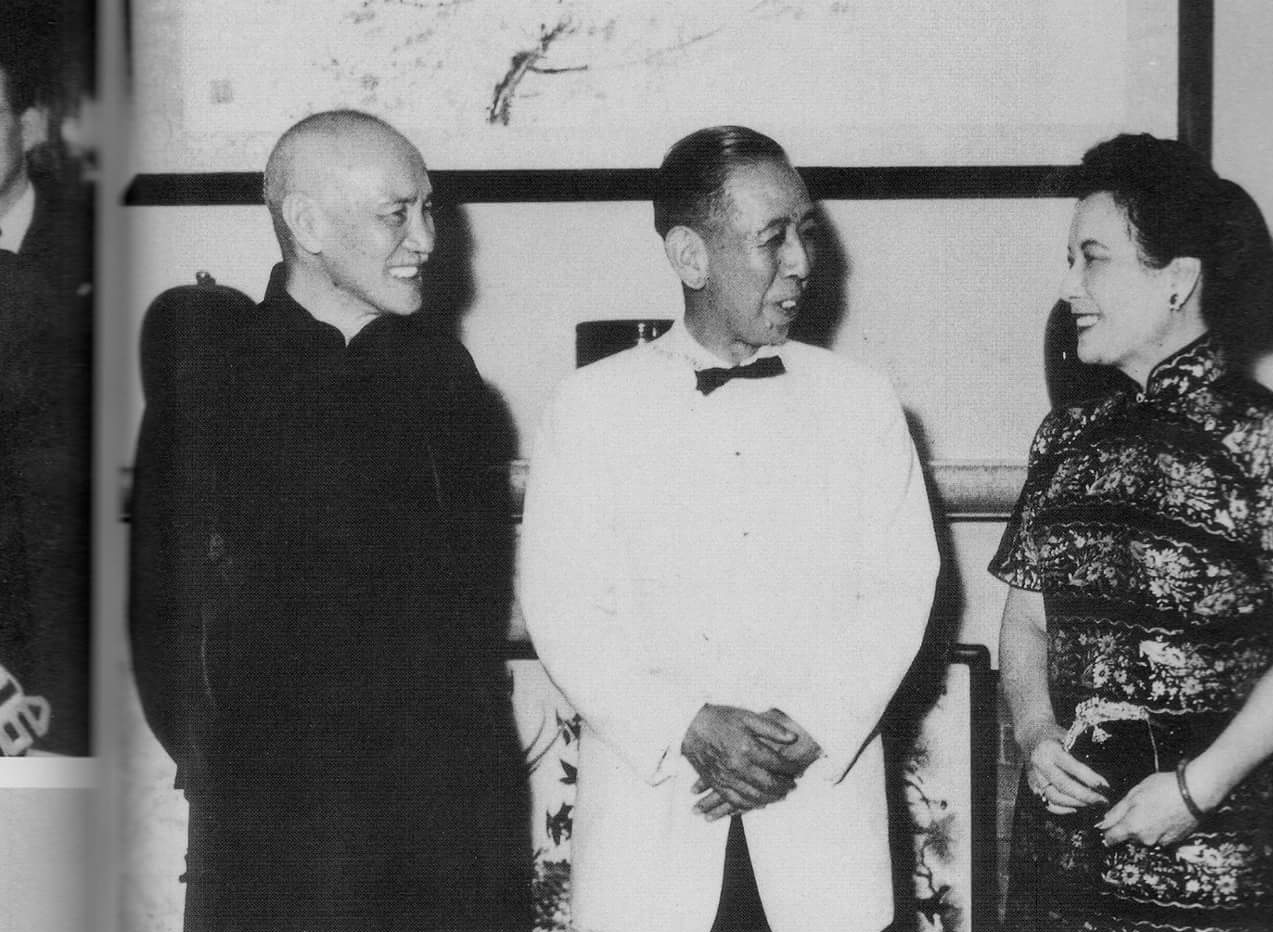
Nobusuke Kishi with President of the Republic of China Chiang Kai-shek and Soong Mei-ling, in 1957

=== Policy goals ===
In February 1957, Kishi became prime minister following the resignation of the ailing Tanzan Ishibashi. His main concerns were with foreign policy, especially with revising the 1952 U.S-Japan Security Treaty, which he felt had turned Japan into a virtual American protectorate. Revising the security treaty was understood to be the first step towards his ultimate goal of abolishing Article 9. Besides his desire for a more independent foreign policy, Kishi wanted to establish close economic relations with the various states of South-East Asia. Finally, Kishi wanted the Allies to commute the remaining sentences of the Class B and Class C war criminals still in serving their prison sentences, arguing that for Japan to play its role in the Cold War as a Western ally required forgetting about Japan's war crimes in the past.

=== Pursuit of an Asian Development Fund ===
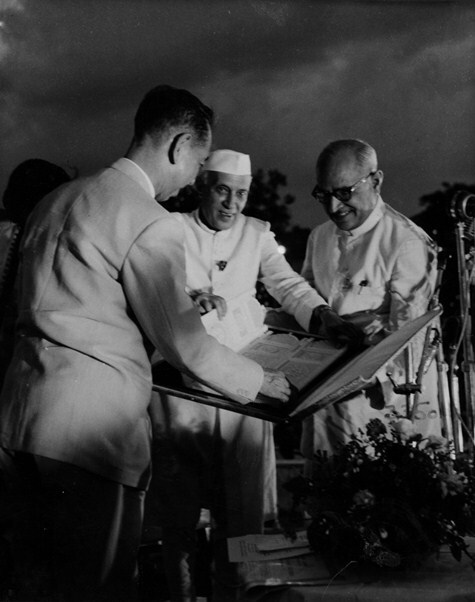
Indian Prime Minister Jawaharlal Nehru presenting Welcome Address to Kishi, New Delhi, 24 May 1957

In the first year of Kishi's term, Japan joined the United Nations Security Council, paid war reparations to Indonesia, signed a new commercial treaty with Australia, and signed peace treaties with Czechoslovakia and Poland. In 1957, Kishi presented a plan for a Japanese-dominated Asian Development Fund (ADF), which was to operate under the slogan "Economic Development for Asia by Asia", calling for Japan to invest millions of yen in Southeast Asia. With access to markets in China and North Korea cut off due to Cold War polarization, Japanese and American leaders alike looked to Southeast Asia as a market for Japanese goods and source of raw materials. Moreover, the Americans wanted more aid to Asia to spur economic growth that would stem the appeal of Communism, but were disinclined to spend the money themselves. The prospect of Japan spending some $500 million US in low interest loans and aid projects in Southeast Asia had the benefit from Kishi's viewpoint of improving his standing in Washington, and giving him more leverage in his talks to revise the U.S.-Japan Security Treaty.

In pursuit of the ADF, Kishi visited India, Pakistan, Burma, Thailand, Ceylon, and Taiwan in May 1957, asking the leaders of those states to join the ADF, but with the exception of Taiwan, which agreed to join, the other nations gave equivocal answers. In November, Kishi once again toured Southeast Asia to promote the idea of an ADF, this time visiting South Vietnam, Cambodia, Laos, Malaysia, Indonesia, the Philippines, Australia, and New Zealand. These countries, all of which Japan had attacked and/or occupied during World War II, also expressed ambivalence or disdain toward joining the proposed framework, with the sole exception of Laos, which was in desperate need of foreign aid at that time. Even in countries that were not occupied by Japan like India, Ceylon, and Pakistan, Kishi encountered obstacles. Indian Prime Minister Jawaharlal Nehru told Kishi during his visit to New Delhi that he wanted his nation to be neutral in the Cold War, and given that Japan was allied to the United States, joining the ADF would be in effect aligning India with the Americans. During his visit to Karachi, the Pakistani Prime Minister Huseyn Shaheed Suhrawardy told Kishi that he thought of himself as a "human being rather than an Asian first", and preferred bilateral over multilateral aid because a multilateral aid framework would put participating countries into competition with each other over aid distribution. In sum, bad memories of Japan's wartime depredations in the region, a suspicion of Japanese motives, an unwillingness to enter into neo-colonial relationship with Japan as suppliers of raw materials, Cold War neutralism, and a fear that America was secretly pulling the strings all contributed to the failure of Kishi's ambitious plans to create an Asian economic block reminiscent of the "Greater East Asia Co-Prosperity Sphere" that Japan had claimed to be pursuing in World War II. Ultimately, even the United States was lukewarm about Kishi's project, so it was shelved for the time being, although it was later partially revived in the form of the Asian Development Bank.

=== Pursuit of treaty revision ===
Kishi's next foreign policy initiative was potentially even more difficult: reworking Japan's security relationship with the United States. Kishi always saw the system created by the Americans as temporary and intended that one day Japan would resume its role as a great power; in the interim, he was prepared to work within the American-created system both domestically and internationally to safeguard what he regarded as Japan's interests. In June 1957, Kishi visited the United States, where he was received with honor, being allowed to address a joint session of Congress, throwing the opening pitch for the New York Yankees in a baseball game in New York and being allowed to play golf at an otherwise all-white golf club in Virginia, which the American historian Michael Schaller called "remarkable" honors for a man who as a Cabinet minister had signed the declaration of war against the United States in 1941 and who had presided over the conscription of thousands of Koreans and Chinese as slave labor during World War II. Vice President of the United States Richard Nixon introduced Kishi to Congress as an "honored guest" who was "not only a great leader of the free world, but also a loyal and great friend of the people of the United States."

In November 1957, Kishi laid down his proposals for a revamped extension of the US–Japan Mutual Security Treaty, and the Eisenhower administration finally agreed to negotiations on a revised version. The American ambassador Douglas MacArthur II (the nephew of the famous general) had reported to Washington that Kishi was the only Japanese politician who could stem the tide towards anti-Americanism in the country, and if the U.S. refused to revise the security treaty in Japan's favor, Japan could turn toward neutralism or accommodation with the communist bloc. The U.S. Secretary of State, John Foster Dulles, wrote in a memo to President Eisenhower that the United States was "at the point of having to make a Big Bet" in Japan and Kishi was the "only bet we had left in Japan". Meanwhile, Kishi was able to take advantage of a growing anti-US military base movement in Japan, as exemplified by the ongoing Sunagawa Struggle over proposed expansion of the US air base at Tachikawa and the explosion of anger in Japan over the Girard Incident, to insinuate to U.S. leaders that if the treaty were not revised the continued existence of U.S. bases in Japan might become untenable.

Anticipating public opposition to his plans for revising the security treaty, Kishi brought before the Diet a harsh "Police Duties Bill", which would give the police vastly expanded powers to crush demonstrations and to conduct searches of homes without warrants. In response to the police bill, a nationwide coalition of left-leaning civic organizations led by the Japan Socialist Party and the Sōhyō labor federation launched a variety of protest activities in the fall of 1958 with the aim of killing the bill. These protests succeeded in arousing public anger at the bill and Kishi was forced to withdraw it.

=== Anpo protests ===
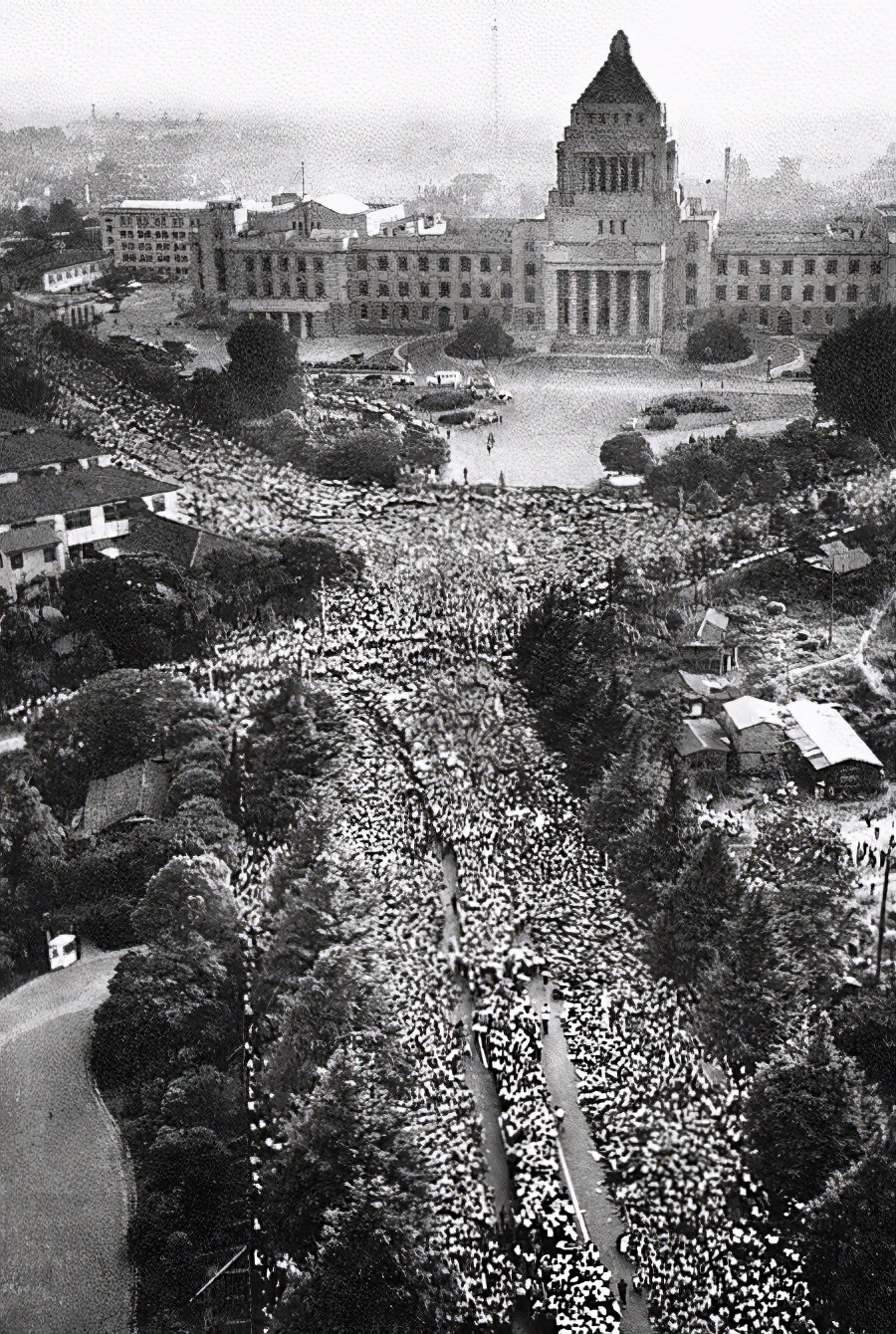
Protesters flood the streets around the Japanese National Diet to protest against revision of the U.S.-Japan Security Treaty, June 18, 1960

In late 1959, it became clear that Kishi intended to break with longstanding precedent that prime ministers serve no more than two consecutive terms. Kishi hoped that by successfully revising the Security Treaty, he would have attained the political capital necessary to pull off this feat. In response to Kishi's break with tradition, Kishi's opponents within his own Liberal Democratic Party, who felt they had waited long enough for their chance at power, vowed to do whatever was necessary to bring about the end of his premiership. Meanwhile, final negotiations on the new treaty wrapped up in 1959, and in January 1960, Kishi traveled to Washington, D.C., where he signed the new treaty with President Eisenhower on January 19. During his visit to the United States, Kishi appeared on the January 25, 1960 cover of Time magazine, which declared that the Prime Minister's "134 pound body packed pride, power and passion—a perfect embodiment of his country's amazing resurgence" while Newsweek called him the "Friendly, Savvy Salesman from Japan" who had created the "economic powerhouse of Asia".

However, even though the revised treaty addressed almost all of Japan's complaints with the original treaty, and put the U.S.-Japan alliance on a much more equal footing, the notion of having any sort of security treaty at all with the United States was unpopular with broad sections of the Japanese public, who saw the treaty as allowing for Japan to once again become involved in a war. In 1959, the nationwide coalition that had successfully defeated Kishi's Police Duties Bill in 1958 had rebranded itself as the "People's Council for Preventing Revision of the Security Treaty" (Anpo Jōyaku Kaitei Soshi Kokumin Kaigi) and began recruiting additional member organizations and organizing protest activities against the revised Security Treaty. In a sign of things to come, radical student activists from the Zengakuren student federation and leftist labor unionists invaded the compound of the National Diet in November 1959 to express their anger at the Treaty, and in January, Zengakuren activists organized a sit-in in Tokyo's Haneda Airport to attempt to prevent Kishi from flying to Washington to sign the treaty, but were cleared away by police.

Because the new treaty was better than the old one, Kishi expected it to be ratified in relatively short order. Accordingly, he invited Eisenhower to visit Japan beginning on June 19, 1960, in part to celebrate the newly ratified treaty. If Eisenhower's visit had proceeded as planned, he would have become the first sitting US president to visit Japan. However, when debate on the treaty began in the Diet, the opposition Japan Socialist Party, abetted by Kishi's rivals in his own party, employed a variety of parliamentary tactics to drag out debate as long as possible, in hopes of preventing ratification before Eisenhower's planned arrival on June 19, and giving the extra-parliamentary protests more time to grow.

As the date of Eisenhower's planned visit drew near, Kishi grew increasingly desperate to ratify the treaty in time for his arrival. On May 19, 1960, Kishi suddenly called for a snap vote on the Treaty. When Socialist Diet members attempted a sit-in to block the vote, Kishi introduced 500 policemen into the Diet and had his political opponents physically dragged out by the police. Kishi then passed the revised Treaty with only members of his own party present. Kishi's anti-democratic actions during this "May 19 Incident" outraged much of the nation, with even conservative newspapers calling for Kishi's resignation. Thereafter, the anti-Treaty protest movement dramatically increased in size, with the Sōhyō labor federation carrying out a series of nationwide strikes and large crowds gathering around the National Diet on nearly a daily basis.

On June 10, White House Press Secretary James Hagerty arrived at Tokyo's Haneda Airport to make advance preparations for Eisenhower's impending arrival. Hagerty was picked up in a black car by US Ambassador to Japan Douglas MacArthur II, who deliberately provoked an international incident by ordering that the car be driven into a large crowd of protesters. MacArthur felt that if the demonstrators were going to resort to violence it would be better for both the US and Japanese governments to know rather than waiting to test their resolve at the arrival of the President. In the so-called "Hagerty Incident", the protesters surrounded the car, rocking it back and forth for more than an hour while standing on its roof, chanting anti-American slogans, and singing protest songs. Ultimately, MacArthur and Hagerty had to be rescued by a US Marines military helicopter.

On 15 June 1960, the radical student activists from Zengakuren attempted to storm the Diet compound once again, precipitating a fierce battle with police in which a female Tokyo University student named Michiko Kanba was killed. Kanba's death led to the largest demonstrations ever in Japanese history, against both police brutality and the treaty. By this point, Kishi had become so unpopular that all the LDP factions united to demand that he resign. In April 1960, across the Korea straits, South Korean president Syngman Rhee had been overthrown in the April Revolution, led by protesting university students, and at the time, there were serious fears in Japan that protests led by university students against the Kishi government might likewise lead to a revolution, making it imperative to ditch the very unpopular Kishi.

Desperate to stay in office long enough to host Eisenhower's visit, Kishi hoped to secure the streets in time for Eisenhower's arrival by calling out the Japan Self Defense Forces and tens of thousands of right-wing thugs that would be provided by his friend, the yakuza-affiliated right-wing "fixer" Yoshio Kodama. However, he was talked out of these extreme measures by his cabinet, and thereafter had no choice but to cancel Eisenhower's visit and take responsibility for the chaos by announcing on June 16 that he would resign within one month's time.

Despite Kishi's announcement, the anti-Treaty protests grew larger than ever, with the largest protest of the entire movement taking place on June 18. However, on June 19, the revised Security Treaty automatically took effect in accordance with Japanese law, 30 days after having passed the lower house of the Diet. On July 15, 1960, Kishi officially resigned and Hayato Ikeda became prime minister. Ikeda soon made clear that there would be no further attempts by the LDP to revise Article 9 of the Constitution for the foreseeable future, which from Kishi's perspective, meant that all of his efforts had been for naught.

== Stabbing incident ==
On July 14, 1960, Kishi was attacked by a knife-wielding assailant as he was leaving the prime minister's residence to host a garden party celebrating Hayato Ikeda's impending ascension to the premiership. The assailant was Taisuke Aramaki, an unemployed 65-year-old man affiliated with various right wing groups. Aramaki stabbed Kishi six times in the thigh, causing Kishi to bleed profusely, although Kishi survived because the blade had missed major arteries. Kishi was rushed to a nearby hospital, where he received a total of 30 stitches to close his wounds. Reporters raced after him and climbed on stepladders to peer into his hospital room, with nurses angrily closing the curtains on them.

Aramaki was arrested at the scene, tried, found guilty, and sentenced to three years in prison in May 1962. Despite being unemployed, he had somehow been able to post a substantial bail during the intervening two years.

Aramaki never clearly stated the motivations for his attack. Despite the violent nature of the attack, Aramaki denied that he had intended to kill Kishi, later telling a reporter in an interview, "Yeah, I stabbed him six times, but if I wanted him dead, I would have just killed him." Aramaki told the same reporter that he had visited with the family of Michiko Kanba prior to his attack, perhaps suggesting that he sympathized with Kanba and blamed Kishi for her death. According to court records, Aramaki told police that he was angry at Kishi's mishandling of the Security Treaty crisis and wanted to "encourage Kishi to feel remorse".

However, some figures close to Kishi considered Aramaki's supposed anger in relation to the Anpo protests to be a cover story. In her 1992 memoir, Kishi's daughter Yōko wrote that Aramaki was "a paid assassin, who knew how to use a knife, who was hired by someone who hated my father and wanted to hurt him". In the prewar period, Aramaki had been secretary general of the right-wing ultranationalist Taikakai ("Great Reform Society"), and in the post-war period, he became a member of LDP factional leader Banboku Ōno's private extraparliamentary pressure group (ingaidan). Many LDP politicians felt that the stabbing had been carried out at Ōno's behest, as Ōno had openly hoped to succeed Kishi as prime minister and was known to be angry that Kishi had thrown his support behind Ikeda.

Curiously, Kishi was largely silent on the attack in his memoirs, devoting only two lines to it and saying only that he did not know the reason, and Kishi's brother Eisaku Satō did not even mention the attack in his diary entry for that day.

== Later years ==
After taking power in a coup d'état in May 1961, the South Korean dictator General Park Chung Hee visited Japan in November 1961 to discuss establishing diplomatic relations between Japan and South Korea, which were finally achieved in 1965. Park had been a Japanese military officer serving in the Manchukuo Army and had fought with the Kwantung Army against guerrillas in Manchuria. During his visit to Japan, Park met with Kishi, and speaking in his fluent, albeit heavily Korean-accented Japanese, praised Japan for the "efficiency of the Japanese spirit", and said that he wanted to learn "good plans" from Japan for South Korea. Besides fond reminiscences about the Japanese officers in Manchukuo who taught him about how to give a "good thrashing" to one's opponents, Park was very interested in Kishi's economic policies in Manchuria as a model for South Korea. Kishi told the Japanese press after his meeting with Park that he was a "little embarrassed" by Park's rhetoric, which was virtually unchanged from the sort of talk used by Japanese officers in World War II, with none of the concessions to the world of 1961 that Kishi himself employed. During his time as president of South Korea, Park launched the Five-Year Plans for the economic development of South Korea featuring statist economic policies that very closely resembled Five-Year Plan Kishi had administered in Manchukuo.

For the rest of his life, Kishi remained devoted to the cause of revising the Japanese Constitution to get rid of Article 9 and remilitarizing Japan. In 1965, Kishi gave a speech where he called for Japanese rearmament as "a means of eradicating completely the consequences of Japan's defeat and the American occupation. It is necessary to enable Japan finally to move out of the post-war era and for the Japanese people to regain their self-confidence and pride as Japanese." In his final years, Kishi grew increasingly bitter that constitutional revision had not yet come to pass. In his memoirs, he somewhat angrily recalled, "the idea of constitutional revision had always remained at the forefront of [my] mind... The two main culprits in destroying the momentum toward constitutional revision were Hayato Ikeda and my brother, Eisaku Satō, who, while they held power, made sure the constitution would remain unchanged. That is why the call for constitutional revision died with my administration."

Kishi remained in the Diet until retiring from politics in 1979. Even after he retired, he remained a strong influence behind the scenes in LDP politics. After several months of illness, Kishi died on August 7, 1987, at the age of 90.

== Controversies ==
=== Accusations of corruption ===
Political scientist Richard Samuels has found extensive corruption during Kishi's time as prime minister. In February 1958, when the Indonesian president Sukarno visited Japan, the Tokyo police refused to provide security under the grounds that this was a private visit, not a state one. At that point, Kishi asked one of his close friends, the yakuza gangster Yoshio Kodama, to provide thugs from the underworld for Sukarno's protection. During Sukarno's visit, Kishi negotiated a reparations agreement with Indonesia, where Japan agreed to provide compensation for war-time suffering. Kishi's reasons for paying reparations to Indonesia had less to do with guilt over the Japanese occupation and more to do with the chances to engage in questionable contracts to reward his friends as Kishi insisted that Japan would only pay reparations in the form of goods, not money. In April 1958, Kishi told the Indonesian Foreign Minister Soebandrio that he wanted Indonesia to ask to receive reparations in the form of ships built exclusively by the Kinoshita Trading Company-which happened to be run by Kinoshita Shigeru, a metal merchant and an old friend of Kishi's from their Manchurian days in the 1930s-even though the Kinoshita company had never built ships before, and there were many other well-established Japanese shipbuilders who could have provided ships at a lower price. All of the reparations contracts to the various states of South-East Asia during Kishi's time as prime minister went to firms run by businessmen who were closely associated with him during his time in Manchuria in the 1930s. Additionally, there were frequent claims that when it came time to award reparations contracts, high-ranking Indonesian politicians had to receive kickbacks, and that ordinary Indonesians never received any benefits from the reparations.

During the same period, there were questions about the M-fund, a secret American fund intended to stabilize Japan economically. The American Assistant Attorney General Norbert Schlei alleged, "Beginning with Prime Minister Kishi, the Fund has been treated as a private preserve of the individuals into whose control it has fallen. Those individuals have felt able to appropriate huge sums from the Fund for their own personal and political purposes... The litany of abuses begins with Kishi who, after obtaining control of the fund from (then Vice President Richard) Nixon, helped himself to a fortune of one trillion yen."

=== Release of war criminals ===
Like many of his fellow conservatives in Japan, Kishi believed that Japan's war in Asia and the Pacific had been a war not of aggression but of self-defense, and thus that the treatment of himself and his colleagues as "war criminals" was unjustified and merely an example of victor's justice. As prime minister, he pressured the Eisenhower administration into expediting the release of convicted Class B and Class C war criminals. He also sought to commemorate executed Class A war criminals. In 1960, Kishi was involved in dedicating, on Mount Sangane in Aichi prefecture, a headstone to General Tojo and six other military leaders executed after the Tokyo war crimes trial, marking their grave as that of "the seven patriots who died for their country".

=== Connections to the Unification Church ===
Beginning in the mid-1960s, Kishi developed connections to the Unification Church (UC, sometimes known as the "Moonies") in Japan. The sect shared Kishi's commitment to anti-communism and enjoyed protection from prosecution by the LDP. Kishi was publicly known as a friend of the sect's leader Sun Myung Moon (1920–2012). Their headquarters in Japan was built “on land in Tokyo once owned by Kishi." When Moon was convicted and jailed for tax evasion in the United States, Kishi wrote a letter asking President Ronald Reagan to correct the "injustice" and release Moon. At this point, the UC's forcible recruitment of young people in Japan had already garnered attention as a societal problem, but Kishi evaluated the leader of the cult as "sincere and valuable." The relationship between the Kishi and Abe families and the UC was maintained even after that. The LDP/UC cooperation has carried on until the present day.

Tetsuya Yamagami killed Kishi's grandson Shinzo Abe and blamed the Unification Church for his family's financial problems and his older brother's death by suicide because his lymphoma was neglected. Researching the church's connections to Abe in the months before the assassination Yamagami blamed Shinzo Abe and Kishi for spreading the church's influence in Japan.

== Personal life and family ==
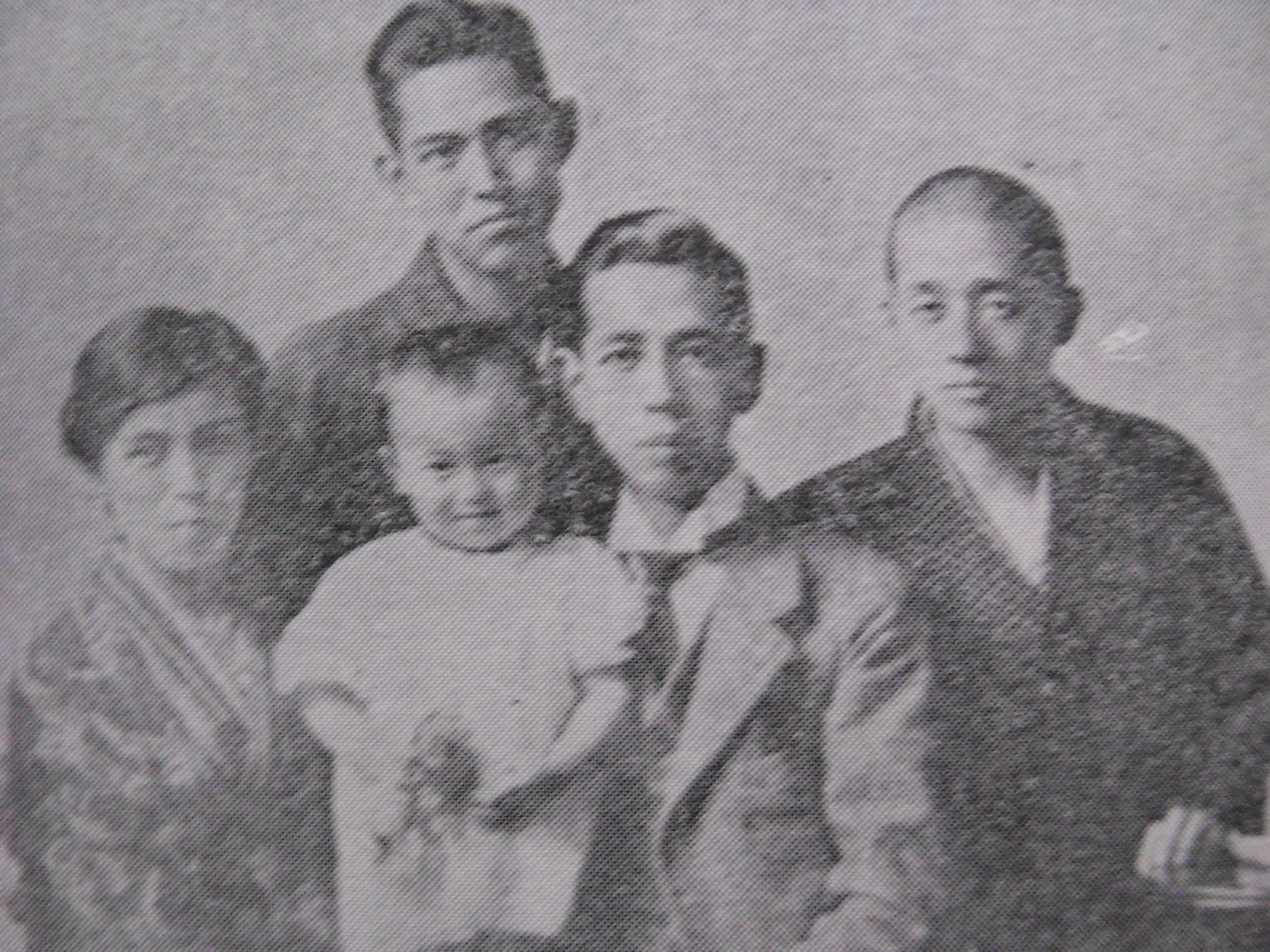
Kishi's family in 1923, from left to right: Kishi's wife Yoshiko, Kishi's brother Eisaku Satō (rear), Kishi's son Nobukazu, Kishi, Kishi's cousin Hiroshi Yoshida

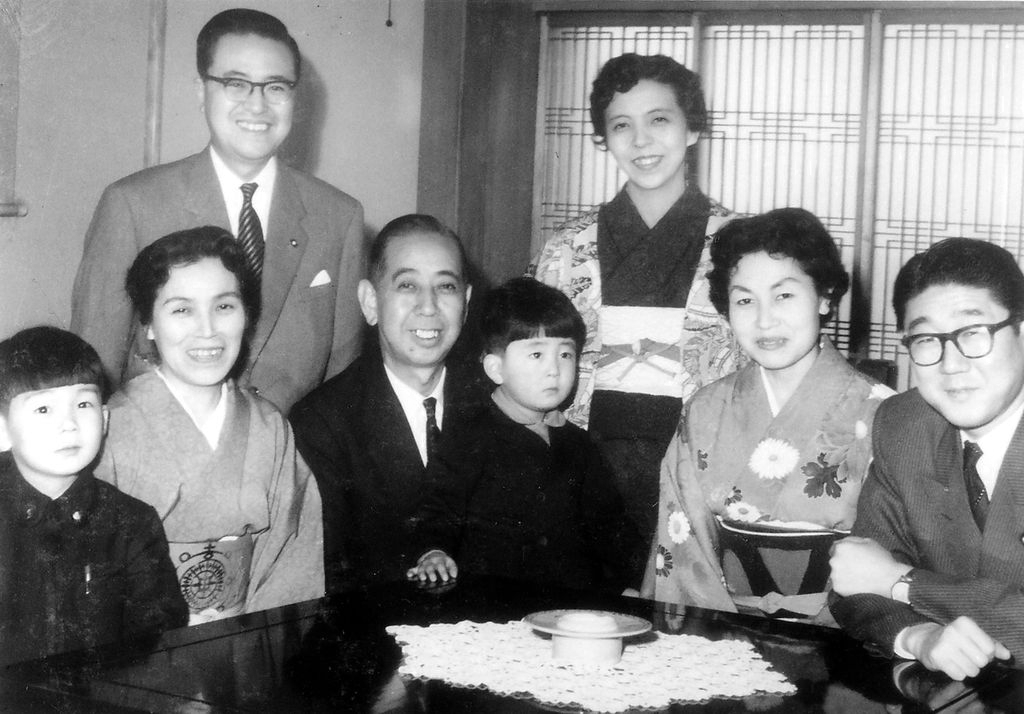
Kishi/Abe family, from left to right: Hironobu Abe, Yoshiko Kishi, Nobukazu Kishi, Nobusuke Kishi, Shinzō Abe, Yōko Abe, unknown female relative, and Shintarō Abe.

In 1919, Kishi married his cousin Yoshiko Kishi, and was adopted by her father, shizoku Nobumasa Kishi. Their son Nobukazu was born in 1921, and their daughter Yōko was born in 1928.

Kishi's daughter Yōko Kishi married politician and future foreign minister Shintarō Abe. Their second son, Shinzō Abe, served as prime minister of Japan from 2006 to 2007 and again from 2012 to 2020. Their third son, Nobuo Kishi, was adopted by Kishi's son Nobukazu shortly after birth, lived with Kishi during the later years of his life, won Kishi's historical Diet seat in 2012, and became Minister of Defense in 2020.

SATO-KISHI-ABE (佐藤-岸-安倍) Family Tree

Female Male

SHIN Soroku Kuge Judge (1844–1928)	MATSUOKA Gorozaemon (c.1773–1831)	KUNIHIRO Jirozaemon (c.1733–1853)	SATO Nobuhiro Governor of Shimane (1816–1900)	Marquess; Inoue Kaoru (Note: House of Peers) (great-great uncle to KISHI Nakako) (1836-1915)
Gensui; Prince FUSHIMI Hiroyasu (1875–1946)	SHIBA Kuma (married Baron SHIBA Chuzaburo)	SHIN Keita; Ishikawajima Shipyard	MATSUOKA Yu (OGAWA) (1844–1936)	MATSUOKA Sanjuro; Shipping Magnate (1831–1893)	MATSUOKA Oko (KUNIHIRO) (c.1840–1866)	SATO Mine (KUNIHIRO) (c.1840-c.1873)	SATO Nobuhiko Yamaguchi Assembly (1840–1898)	KISHI Yozo	Viscount; Yoshimasa Oshima Governor-General (1850–1926)
Marquis; KACHO Hironobuo Peer (1905–1970)	Baron; SHIBA Masao Peer (1902–1983)	MATSUOKA Ryuko (SHIN) (c.1849-c.1909)	MATSUOKA Yosuke Foreign Minister (Note: Yamaguchi 2nd district (1928–1942)) (1880–1946)	MATSUOKA Kensuke (1875-??)	SATO Fujieda (MATSUOKA) (1884–1944)	Dr SATO Matsusuke (1877–1911)	SATO Shigeyo "Moyo" (1873–1932)	SATO Hidesuke (c.1830–1884)	KISHI Nobumasa	ABE Hyōsuke Heki Nanushi	HONDO Hideko (OSHIMA)
MATSUOKA Haruko (KACHO) (1934- )	MATSUOKA Shinzo; Sumitomo (1923–2010)	TAJIMA Shuko (married TAJIMA Joji)	MATSUOKA Kenichiro; TV Executive (1914–1994)	MATSUOKA Mitsuo Hikari Mayor (1903–1971)	SATO Hiroko (1907–1987)	SATO Eisaku Prime Minister (Note: Yamaguchi 2nd district (1947–1993)) (1901–1975)	SATO Ichiro Navy Vice Admiral (1889–1958)	KISHI Nobusuke Prime Minister (1897–1987)	KISHI Yoshiko (1901–1980)	ABE Kan Representative (Note: Yamaguchi 1st district (pre-1996)) (1894–1946)	ABE Shizuko (HONDO)
MATSUOKA Shizuko (Sakamoto)	MATSUOKA Masuno Councillor (Note: Yamaguchi Councillors district) (1934–2024)	SATO Kazuko (ANZAI)	SATO Shinji Foreign Minister (Note: Yamaguchi 2nd district) (1932–2016)	KISHI Nakako (grand-niece of Genrō INOUE Kaoru)	KISHI Nobukazu; Seibu Oil (1921–2017)	ABE Yoko (KISHI) (1928–2024)	ABE Shintaro Foreign Minister (1924–1991)
ADACHI Masahi Councillor (Note: Councillors At-Large) (1959- )	ADACHI Mika (SATO)	KISHI Nobuo Minister of Defense (1959- )	ABE Hironobu; Mitsubishi (1952- )	ABE Sachiko (Ushio)	ABE Shinzo Prime Minister (Note: Yamaguchi 4th district) (1954–2022)	ABE Akie (MATSUZAKI) (1962- )
Abe no Yoritoki Heian-era ABE ancestor (c.1011–1057)	SATO Tadanobu Heian-era SATO ancestor (1153–1186)	KISHI Nobuchiyo Representative (1991- )	KISHI Tomohiro	ABE Hiroto	ABE Mariko

- = Member of the Imperial Family (until 1947)
- = Chōshū Samurai Family (until 1869)
- = Kaga Samurai Family (until 1869)
- = Prime Minister of Japan
- = Member of Diet
- = Yamaguchi Prefectural Assembly

Parliamentary Districts:

== Honors ==
From the corresponding article in the Japanese Wikipedia

- Coronation Medal (10 November 1928)
- Order of the Sacred Treasure, 5th Class (April 1934)
- Military Medal of Honor (April 1934)
- Grand Cordon of the Order of the Rising Sun with Paulownia Flowers (29 April 1967)
- Grand Cordon of the Order of the Chrysanthemum (7 August 1987; posthumous)

=== Order of precedence ===
- Senior second rank (August 1987; posthumous)
- Senior third rank (July 1960)
- Fourth rank (October 1940)
- Senior fifth rank (September 1934)
- Fifth rank (September 1929)
- Senior sixth rank (September 1927)
- Sixth rank (August 1925)
- Senior seventh rank (October 1923)
- Seventh rank (May 1921)

=== Foreign Honors ===
- Brazil: Grand Cross of the Order of the Southern Cross (26 July 1959)
- Mexico: Sash of the Order of the Aztec Eagle (5 August 1959)
- West Germany: Grand Cross 1st Class of the Order of Merit of the Federal Republic of Germany (1960)
- Republic of China: Grand Cordon of the Order of Propitious Clouds (19 November 1969)
- United Nations: Peace Medal (28 August 1979)

Political offices
Preceded by Tanzan Ishibashi	Prime Minister of Japan; Jan 1957 – Jul 1960	Succeeded by Hayato Ikeda
Preceded by Mamoru Shigemitsu	Minister of Foreign Affairs; Dec 1956 – Jul 1957	Succeeded by Aiichiro Fujiyama
New office	Minister of State without Portfolio; Oct 1943 – Jul 1944	Office abolished
Preceded by Seizō Sakonji	Minister of Commerce & Industry; Oct 1941 – Oct 1943	Succeeded by Hideki Tōjō
Party political offices
Preceded by Tanzan Ishibashi	President of the Liberal Democratic Party; 1957 – 1960	Succeeded by Hayato Ikeda
New title	Secretary-General of the Liberal Democratic Party; 1955 – 1956	Succeeded by Takeo Miki
New title	Head of Tōkakai faction 1955 – 1979	Succeeded by Takeo Fukuda
New title	Secretary-General of the Japan Democratic Party; 1954 – 1955	Office abolished
