= Kenichiro Matsuoka =

Japanese media executive (1914–1994)

Kenichiro Matsuoka 松岡 謙一郎
- Born: June 13, 1914; Washington, D.C., United States
- Died: December 23, 1994 (aged 80)
- Occupation: Media Executive
- Parent(s): Yōsuke Matsuoka; Ryuko Matsuoka (Shin)
- Relatives: Kaneko (sister); Yoji (brother); Hiroko Satō (cousin)

Kenichiro Matsuoka (松岡 謙一郎, Matsuoka Ken'ichirō; June 13, 1914 – December 23, 1994) was a Japanese media executive. He founded and served as the first President of Japan Cable Television, and as a Vice President of Asahi Broadcasting Company (now TV Asahi).

== Biography ==
The eldest son of Japanese foreign minister Yōsuke Matsuoka, Kenichiro was born in the United States while his father was First Secretary of the Embassy of Japan, Washington, D.C., attended Gyōsei High School and Tokyo Imperial University, majoring in Political Science and Law.

When his father took over leadership of the South Manchuria Railway (Mantetsu), Kenichiro became involved with the Manchukuo Film Association (Man'ei), formed in partnership with Mantetsu. Through Man'ei, Kenichiro would meet Negishi Kanichi and Masahiko Amakasu, who gave him experience in building a film studio from the ground up. Kenichiro would also meet the popular pre-war Japanese actress Yoshiko Yamaguchi, whom Yamaguchi would write in her biography "Ri Kōran: My Half Life", to be her first love. They would meet again after the war, at which time Kenichiro attempted to rekindle the relationship, but by then, Yamaguchi was already involved with the noted designer Isamu Noguchi.

Graduating Tokyo Imperial University in 1941, there was talk of Kenichiro attending school in America to defuse any suspicion of Japan's war ambitions, and he would join the state run news agency Dōmei Tsushin that would be broken up by Allied forces during the Occupation of Japan. During the war, he would also serve as an accounting officer for the Imperial Navy, and followed Yōnosuke Natori to the Sun News Photo agency following Dōmei's breakup.

In 1957, Matsuoka joined the fledgling Nippon Educational Television Board (NET) television network. NET courted Matsuoka for his knowledge of foreign culture and fluency in English and French, having been born in the United States, studied in Paris, and experienced with Man'ei. He was able to watch foreign programming in its original format and was responsible for licensing Rawhide and Laramie, gaining high ratings for the new network, and giving them an advantage over rivals NHK and Fuji TV.

By the time NET parent company Asahi Shimbun would rebrand the network as Asahi Broadcasting Corporation in 1977, Matsuoka would be promoted to Executive Vice President (Fuku-shacho) at Asahi Broadcasting Co, serve as a founder of Japan Cable Television, and act as its first president, a position he held until his retirement in 1986.

== Legacy ==
Kenichiro was portrayed in the 1989 Fuji TV limited series Farewell Li Xianglan by Hideki Saijo, and in the TV Tokyo 2007 film Ri Kōran by Fukami Motoki.

== Family ==
Kenichiro's father Yōsuke, was a prominent diplomat in pre-war Japan. Kenichiro's mother Ryuko, was the daughter of an influential kuge judge Shin Soroku, a former retainer of the Chōshū clan, and a beneficiary of their outsized influence in the Meiji Restoration that helped shaped the modern Japanese Government. Kenichiro is related to a cadet branch of the Imperial House through Kacho Haruko, the daughter of Marquis Fushiminomiya Hironobuo and Princess Kaninnomiya Hanako, who was once considered as a potential match for then Crown Prince Akihito. Haruko would end up marrying Kenichiro's younger brother Shinzo. Yōsuke's sister Fujie was widowed in 1911 with two young girls, whom Yosuke supported and were like sisters to Kenichiro. One of those nieces, Hiroko, married her second cousin and future Japanese Prime Minister Eisaku Satō, and further cemented Kenichiro's ties to the contemporary Japanese Prime Minister Shinzo Abe and the Abe political dynasty through Abe's maternal grandfather, Nobusuke Kishi, Eisaku's older brother.

== Family tree ==
MATSUOKA (松岡) Family Tree
Female Male

SHIN Soroku Kuge Judge (1844-1928) | MATSUOKA Gorozaemon (c.1773-1831) | KUNIHIRO Jirozaemon (c.1733-1853) | SATO Nobuhiro Governor of Shimane (1816-1900)
Gensui; Prince FUSHIMI Hiroyasu (1875-1946) | Prince KAN'IN Kotohito (1865-1945) | SHIBA Kuma (married Baron SHIBA Chuzaburo) | SHIN Keita; Ishikawajima Shipyard (1864-??) | MATSUOKA Yu (OGAWA) (1844-1936) | MATSUOKA Sanjuro; Shipping Magnate (1831-1893) | MATSUOKA Oko (KUNIHIRO) (c.1840-1866) | SATO Mine (KUNIHIRO) (c.1840-c.1873) | SATO Nobuhiko; Yamaguchi Assembly (1840-1898) | KISHI Yozo
Marquis; KACHO Hironobuo Peer (1905-1970) | Princess; KAN'IN Hanako (1909-2003) | Baron; SHIBA Masao Todai Professor (1902-1983) | MATSUOKA Ryuko (SHIN) (c.1890-) | MATSUOKA Yosuke; Foreign Minister (1880-1946) | MATSUOKA Kensuke (1875-??) | SATO Fujie (MATSUOKA) | SATO Matsusuke (1877-1911) | SATO Shigeyo "Moyo" (1873-1932) | SATO Hidesuke (c.1830-1884) | KISHI Nobumasa
MATSUOKA Haruko (KACHO) (1934- ) | MATSUOKA Shinzo; Sumitomo (1923-2010) | TAJIMA Shuko (married TAJIMA Joji) | MATSUOKA Kenichiro; TV Executive (1914-1994) | MATSUOKA Kikuko | MATSUOKA Mitsuo; Hikari Mayor (1903-1971) | SATO Hiroko (1907-1987) | SATO Eisaku; Prime Minister (1901-1975) | KISHI Nobusuke; Prime Minister (1897-1987) | KISHI Yoshiko (1901-1980) | ABE Kan; Representative (1894-1946)
TAJIMA Keisuke; Keio Professor | MATSUOKA Ken (1957- ) | MATSUOKA Masuno; Yamaguchi Councillor (1934-2024) | MATSUOKA Shizuko (Sakamoto) | SATO Shinji; Foreign Minister (1932-2016) | KISHI Nobukazu; Seibu Oil (1921-2017) | ABE Yoko (KISHI) (1928-2024) | ABE Shintaro; Foreign Minister (1924-1991)
ADACHI Masahi; Yamazaki Councilor (1959- ) | ADACHI Miki (SATO) | KISHI Nobuo; Minister of Defense (1959- ) | ABE Hironobu; Mitsubishi (1952- ) | ABE Shinzo; Prime Minister (1954-2022)

Legend
- = Member of the Imperial Family (until 1947)
- = Chōshū Samurai Family
- = Kaga Samurai Family
