= Nobuo Kishi =

Japanese politician (born 1959)

- 岸 信夫
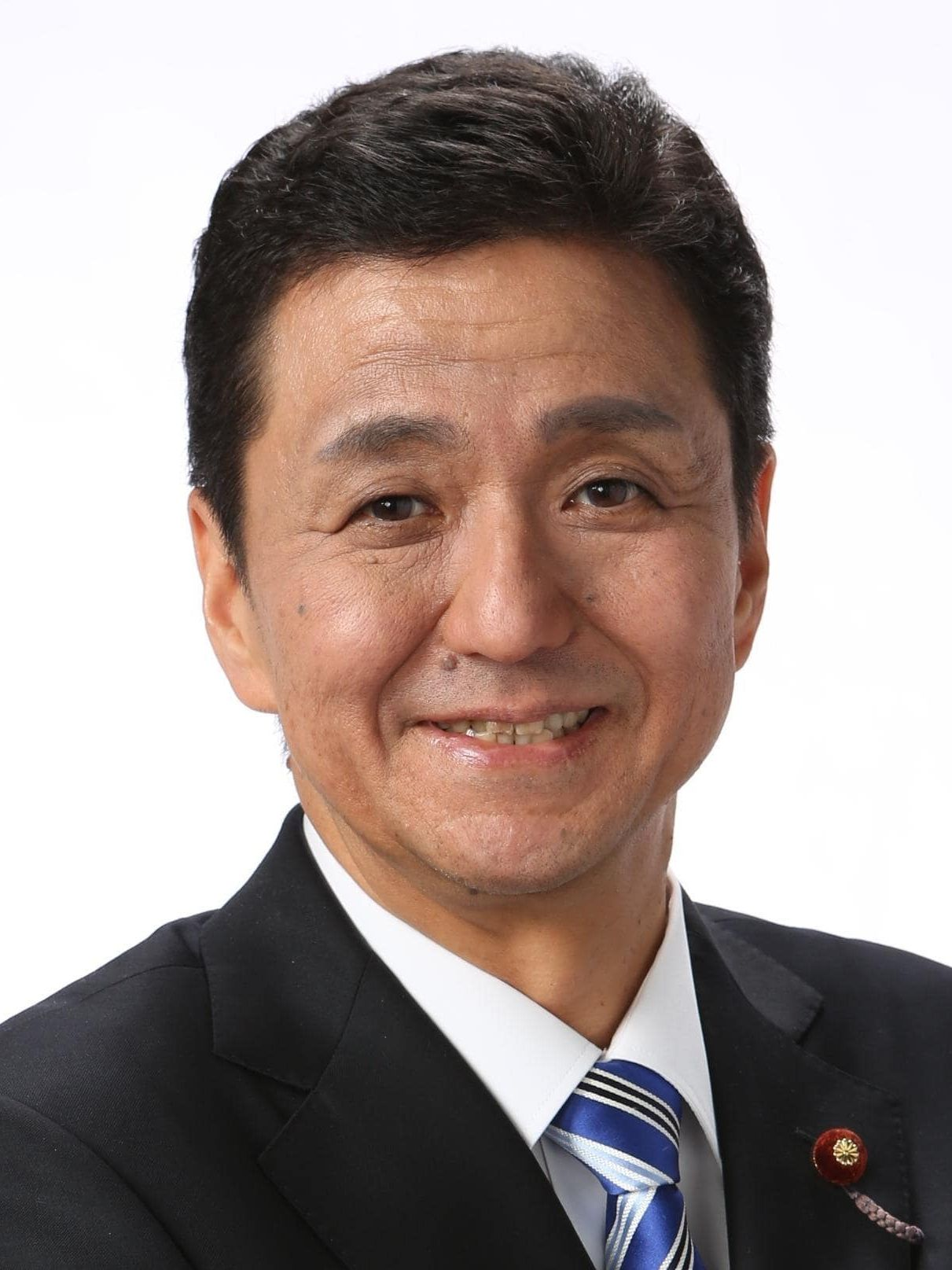
- Official portrait, 2021

Minister of Defense
- In office 16 September 2020 – 10 August 2022
- Prime Minister: Yoshihide Suga; Fumio Kishida
- Preceded by: Taro Kono
- Succeeded by: Yasukazu Hamada

Member of the House of Representatives
- In office 12 December 2012 – 3 March 2023
- Preceded by: Hideo Hiraoka
- Succeeded by: Nobuchiyo Kishi
- Constituency: Yamaguchi 2nd

Member of the House of Councillors
- In office 26 June 2004 – 30 November 2012
- Preceded by: Masuo Matsuoka
- Succeeded by: Kiyoshi Ejima
- Constituency: Yamaguchi at-large

Personal details
- Born: 安倍 信夫 (Abe Nobuo); 1 April 1959 (age 67) Tokyo, Japan
- Party: Liberal Democratic
- Spouse: Chikako Kishi
- Children: Nobuchiyo Kishi
- Parents: Shintaro Abe (biological father); Yoko Kishi (biological mother); Nobukazu Kishi (adopted father)
- Relatives: Satō–Kishi–Abe family
- Education: Keio University (BEc)

Nobuo Kishi (岸 信夫, Kishi Nobuo; born 1 April 1959) is a Japanese politician. He sat in the House of Representatives from 2012 to 2023 representing Yamaguchi’s 2nd District as a member of the Liberal Democratic Party. From September 2020 to August 2022 he served as the Minister of Defense. He is the younger brother of former Japanese prime minister Shinzo Abe.

== Early life ==
Nobuo is the third son of Shintaro Abe and Yoko Abe (née Kishi). He was born in Tokyo. Shortly after his birth, he was adopted by his maternal uncle, Seibu Oil chairman Nobukazu Kishi, who could not have children of his own. He did not know about his actual parentage, or his relationship with Shintaro Abe's other sons (Hironobu and Shinzo Abe), until he was preparing to enter university.

Kishi spent the first decade of his life living in Tokyo with his grandfather, former prime minister Nobusuke Kishi. He graduated from the Faculty of Economics at Keio University in 1981 and joined Sumitomo Corporation, where he worked until 2002. His postings included the United States, Vietnam, and Australia.

== Political career ==
With his brother Abe's backing, Kishi was elected to the House of Councillors in 2004, representing Yamaguchi Prefecture. He became known as a specialist in security issues. He has served as Parliamentary Secretary for Defense (Fukuda and Aso Cabinet), Vice Chairman, LDP Diet Affairs Committee in the House of Councillors, Vice Chairman, Party Organization and Campaign Headquarters of LDP, chairman, Special Committee on Okinawa and Northern Problems.

=== Abe government ===
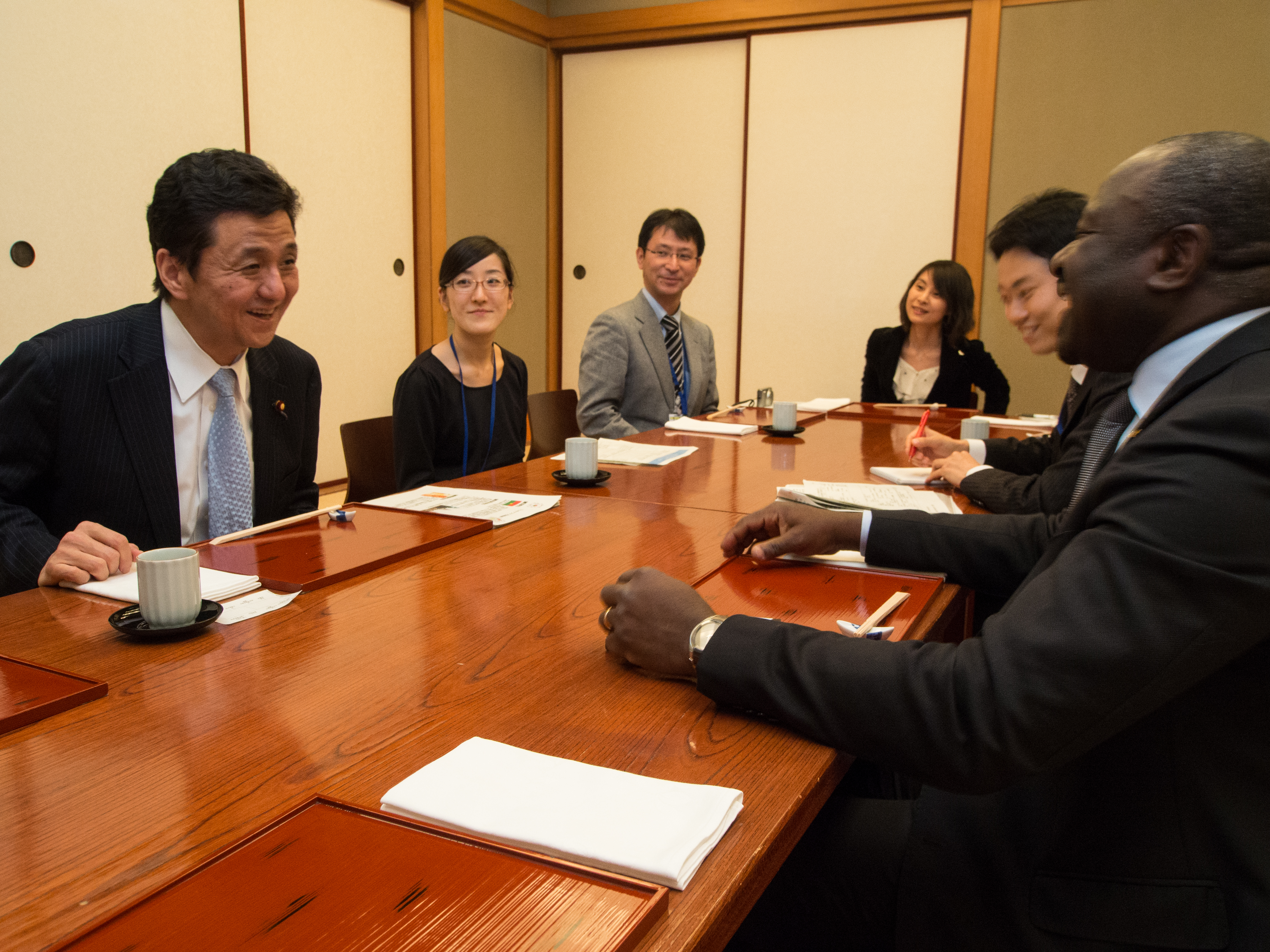
Meeting with Vice Minister for Foreign Affairs Nobuo Kishi

Kishi was elected to the House of Representatives in the 2012 Japanese general election after resigning from his House of Councillors seat. He re-took a seat in Yamaguchi Prefecture that had previously belonged to his grandfather Nobusuke Kishi and great-uncle Eisaku Sato, but that had been lost to the Democratic Party of Japan in the 2009 Japanese general election. Following the 2012 election, Kishi's brother Abe became prime minister. Kishi was promoted to Senior Vice Foreign Minister in 2013.

Kishi became known during this time for his role in promoting the Japan-Taiwan relationship. He helped to arrange an historic meeting between Prime Minister Abe and ROC opposition leader Tsai Ing-wen in 2015. After Tsai's reelection as president, Kishi met with Tsai in Taiwan in January 2020 and again in July 2020 (when he attended the funeral of President Lee Teng-hui).

In 2019, he publicly advocated for Japan acquiring strike capabilities as a defensive measure against North Korea, stating that Japan should not rely upon the United States for defense.

=== Suga and Kishida governments ===
Kishi was appointed as Minister of Defense under Prime Minister Yoshihide Suga in September 2020. Commentator Michael Bosack described this as "a strange pick that signals factional influence and possibly a personal favor," and argued that the faction led by Hiroyuki Hosoda was clearly trying to build Kishi's credentials. Following the news of Kishi's appointment, a Chinese foreign ministry spokesman expressed hope that Japan would refrain from developing official ties with Taiwan.

In October 2020, Kishi released a joint statement with Australian Minister of Defense Linda Reynolds that announced that Japan's Self Defense Forces would be enabled to protect Australian military assets, an act which was made legal in September 2015 through the "Peace and Security Preservation Legislation" passed under the Abe administration. This makes Australia the second country (after the United States) whose assets Japan would be permitted to protect. Kishi and Reynolds also emphasized their opposition to "any destabilizing or coercive unilateral actions that could alter the status quo and increase tensions in the East China Sea," and some analysts have speculated this to be in reference to Chinese maritime activities around the Senkaku Islands. In a September 2021 interview with the Mainichi Shimbun, Kishi stated that Japan cannot stand aside when events occur in Taiwan due to being close neighbors and allies with shared universal values such as freedom and democracy.

In 2021, he visited the controversial Yasukuni Shrine, making him the first sitting Defense Minister to visit the Yasukuni shrine since 2016. In response, the South Korean Foreign Ministry described his visit as "deplorable". The Chinese public condemned his visit, which occurred during a domestic Chinese public and political controversy regarding Chinese actor-singer Zhang Zhehan's photographs with the shrine visible in the background.

After Suga's resignation as prime minister, his successor Fumio Kishida opted to retain Kishi as Defense minister after taking office in October 2021. Nikkei noted that this sent a message of continuity in Japan's policies toward China and Taiwan.

=== Retirement from politics ===
After the assassination of Shinzo Abe on 8 July 2022, Nobuo Kishi had to disclose that the relationship with the controversial Unification Church, also known as the "Moon Sect", extends to him. Kishi acknowledged that members of the group participated as volunteers in his campaign activities, including tasks such as telephone campaigning. Kishida replaced him as Defense Minister a month later.

He announced plans to resign from the House of Representatives due to health issues in 2022, making way for a by-election on 23 April 2023. He was replaced in the House by his son, Nobuchiyo, who won the election with 52.47% of the vote.

== Political positions ==
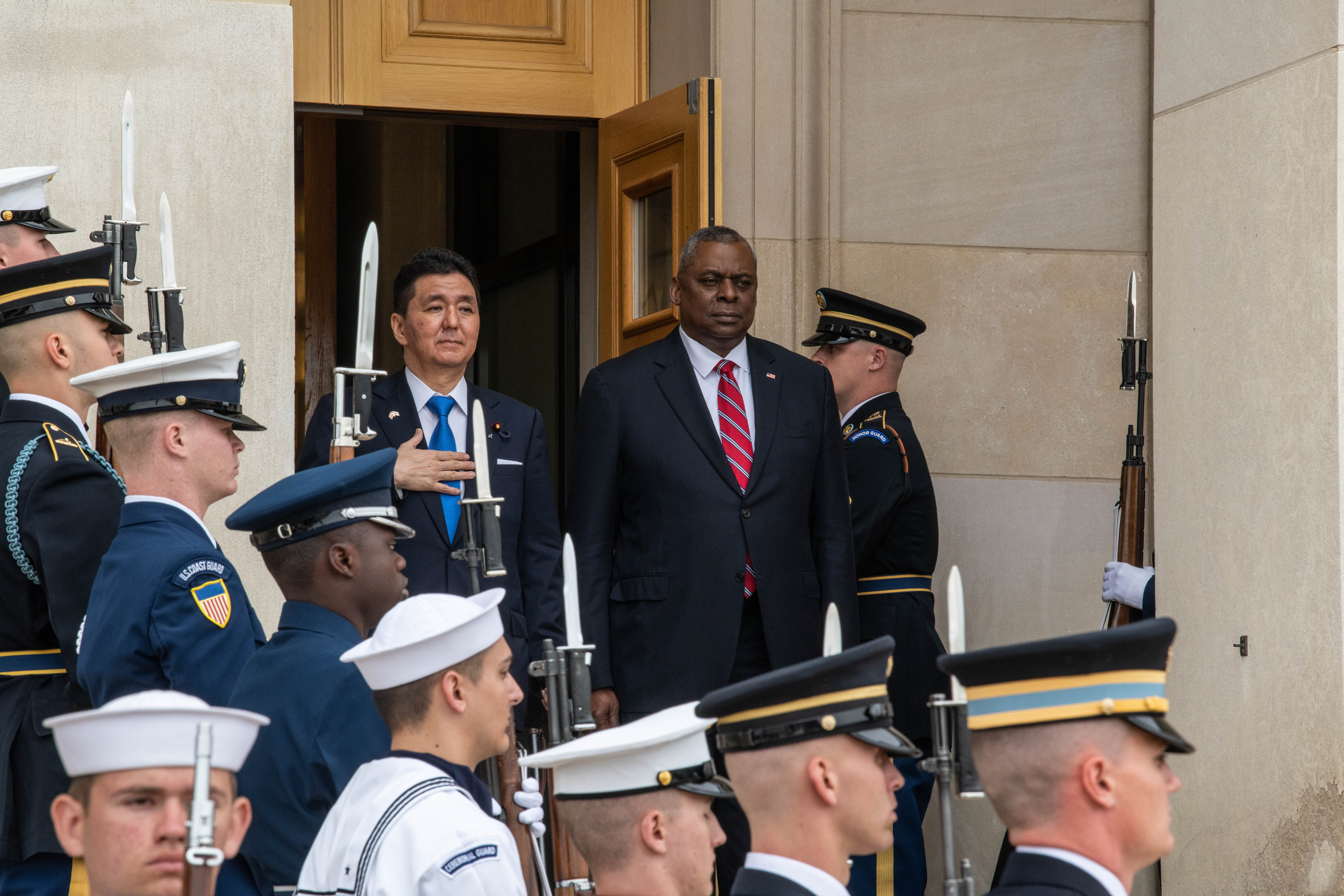
Kishi with US Secretary of Defense Lloyd Austin in May 2022

Kishi gave the following answers to the questionnaire submitted by Mainichi to parliamentarians in 2012:

- in favor of the revision of the Constitution
- in favor of right of collective self-defense (revision of Article 9)
- against the reform of the National Diet (unicameral instead of bicameral)
- in favor of reactivating nuclear power plants
- against the goal of zero nuclear power by 2030s
- in favor of the relocation of Marine Corps Air Station Futenma (Okinawa)
- against the evaluation of the purchase of Senkaku Islands by the Government
- in favor of a strong attitude versus China
- against the participation of Japan to the Trans-Pacific Partnership
- in favor of considering a nuclear-armed Japan in the future (however, after his appointment as defense minister in 2020, he stated that this would "never happen")
- against the reform of the Imperial Household that would allow women to retain their Imperial status even after marriage

In a March 2014 interview, he argued that nationalism was not on the rise in Japan, and that the Abe government would not change Japan's record of striving for peace as a member of international society.

=== Affiliated organizations and parliamentary associations ===
Like his brother Shinzō, Kishi is affiliated with the openly revisionist lobby Nippon Kaigi, and a member of the following right-wing groups at the Diet:

- Nippon Kaigi Diet discussion group (日本会議国会議員懇談会 - Nippon kaigi kokkai giin kondankai)
- Conference of parliamentarians on the Shinto Association of Spiritual Leadership (神道政治連盟国会議員懇談会) - NB: SAS a.k.a. Sinseiren, Shinto Political League, Shinto Seiji Renmei Kokkai Giin Kondankai
- Japan Rebirth (創生「日本」- Sosei Nippon)

== Personal life ==
Kishi began using a cane in 2021, reportedley missed a cabinet meeting in 2021 due to an undisclosed health issue. In 2022, Kishi started to use wheelchair after being diagnosed with a urinary tract infection, which influenced his decision to retire from politics that year. His son, Nobuchiyo Kishi, succeeded him in representing Yamaguchi's 2nd district in the House of Representatives.

=== Family ===
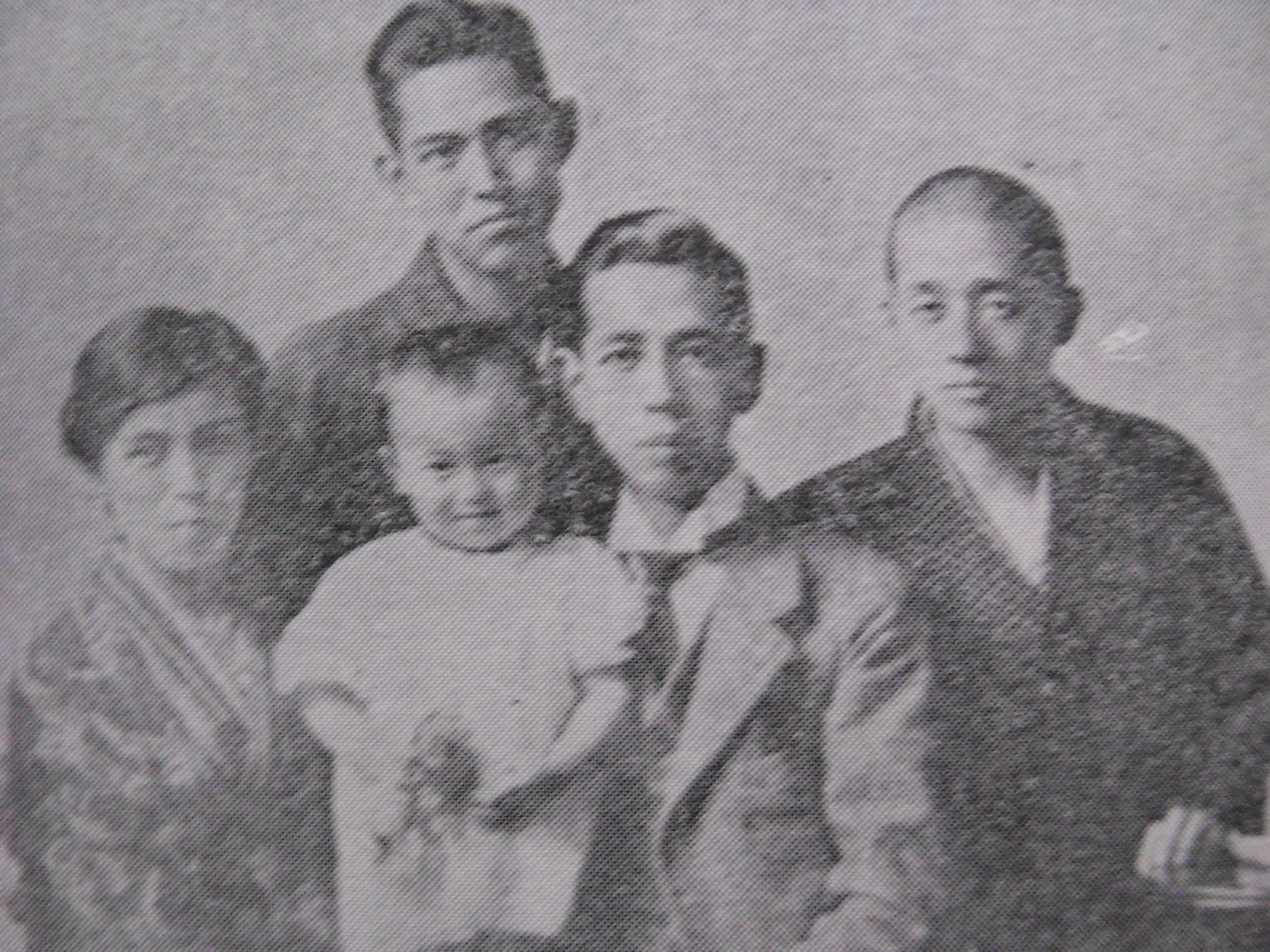
Nobusuke Kishi. Ministry of Agriculture and Commerce (1923). From left: Yoshiko Kishi, Nobukazu Kishi, Nobusuke Kishi, Hiroshi Yoshida (front row) and Eisaku Sato (back row)

- Grandfathers: Kan Abe (politician), Nobusuke Kishi (bureaucrat, prime minister)
- Adopted father (maternal uncle): Nobukazu Kishi (Seibu Oil Chairman Nobusuke Kishi's eldest son)
- Adoptive mother (aunt-in-law): Nakako (Yamaguchi Prefectural Assembly Chairman Joji Tanabe)
- Biological father: Shintaro Abe (Foreign Minister)
- Biological mother: Yoko Abe (Nobusuke Kishi's eldest daughter)
- Great uncle: Eisaku Sato (Prime Minister)
- Eldest brother: Hironobu Abe
- Second brother: Shinzo Abe
- Eldest son: Nobuyoshi Kishi (former Fuji TV reporter, secretary after becoming a minister)

SATO-KISHI-ABE (佐藤-岸-安倍) Family Tree

Female Male

SHIN Soroku Kuge Judge (1844–1928)	MATSUOKA Gorozaemon (c.1773–1831)	KUNIHIRO Jirozaemon (c.1733–1853)	SATO Nobuhiro Governor of Shimane (1816–1900)	Marquess; Inoue Kaoru (Note: House of Peers) (great-great uncle to KISHI Nakako) (1836-1915)
Gensui; Prince FUSHIMI Hiroyasu (1875–1946)	SHIBA Kuma (married Baron SHIBA Chuzaburo)	SHIN Keita; Ishikawajima Shipyard	MATSUOKA Yu (OGAWA) (1844–1936)	MATSUOKA Sanjuro; Shipping Magnate (1831–1893)	MATSUOKA Oko (KUNIHIRO) (c.1840–1866)	SATO Mine (KUNIHIRO) (c.1840-c.1873)	SATO Nobuhiko Yamaguchi Assembly (1840–1898)	KISHI Yozo	Viscount; Yoshimasa Oshima Governor-General (1850–1926)
Marquis; KACHO Hironobuo Peer (1905–1970)	Baron; SHIBA Masao Peer (1902–1983)	MATSUOKA Ryuko (SHIN) (c.1849-c.1909)	MATSUOKA Yosuke Foreign Minister (Note: Yamaguchi 2nd district (1928–1942)) (1880–1946)	MATSUOKA Kensuke (1875-??)	SATO Fujieda (MATSUOKA) (1884–1944)	Dr SATO Matsusuke (1877–1911)	SATO Shigeyo "Moyo" (1873–1932)	SATO Hidesuke (c.1830–1884)	KISHI Nobumasa	ABE Hyōsuke Heki Nanushi	HONDO Hideko (OSHIMA)
MATSUOKA Haruko (KACHO) (1934- )	MATSUOKA Shinzo; Sumitomo (1923–2010)	TAJIMA Shuko (married TAJIMA Joji)	MATSUOKA Kenichiro; TV Executive (1914–1994)	MATSUOKA Mitsuo Hikari Mayor (1903–1971)	SATO Hiroko (1907–1987)	SATO Eisaku Prime Minister (Note: Yamaguchi 2nd district (1947–1993)) (1901–1975)	SATO Ichiro Navy Vice Admiral (1889–1958)	KISHI Nobusuke Prime Minister (1897–1987)	KISHI Yoshiko (1901–1980)	ABE Kan Representative (Note: Yamaguchi 1st district (pre-1996)) (1894–1946)	ABE Shizuko (HONDO)
MATSUOKA Shizuko (Sakamoto)	MATSUOKA Masuno Councillor (Note: Yamaguchi Councillors district) (1934–2024)	SATO Kazuko (ANZAI)	SATO Shinji Foreign Minister (Note: Yamaguchi 2nd district) (1932–2016)	KISHI Nakako (grand-niece of Genrō INOUE Kaoru)	KISHI Nobukazu; Seibu Oil (1921–2017)	ABE Yoko (KISHI) (1928–2024)	ABE Shintaro Foreign Minister (1924–1991)
ADACHI Masahi Councillor (Note: Councillors At-Large) (1959- )	ADACHI Mika (SATO)	KISHI Nobuo Minister of Defense (1959- )	ABE Hironobu; Mitsubishi (1952- )	ABE Sachiko (Ushio)	ABE Shinzo Prime Minister (Note: Yamaguchi 4th district) (1954–2022)	ABE Akie (MATSUZAKI) (1962- )
Abe no Yoritoki Heian-era ABE ancestor (c.1011–1057)	SATO Tadanobu Heian-era SATO ancestor (1153–1186)	KISHI Nobuchiyo Representative (1991- )	KISHI Tomohiro	ABE Hiroto	ABE Mariko

- = Member of the Imperial Family (until 1947)
- = Chōshū Samurai Family (until 1869)
- = Kaga Samurai Family (until 1869)
- = Prime Minister of Japan
- = Member of Diet
- = Yamaguchi Prefectural Assembly

Parliamentary Districts:

House of Councillors
Preceded by Masuo Matsuoka	Councillor for Yamaguchi's at-large district 2004 – present	Incumbent
Political offices
Preceded by Tarō Kōno	Minister of Defence; 2020–2022	Succeeded by Yasukazu Hamada
