= Hironobu Abe =

Japanese businessman

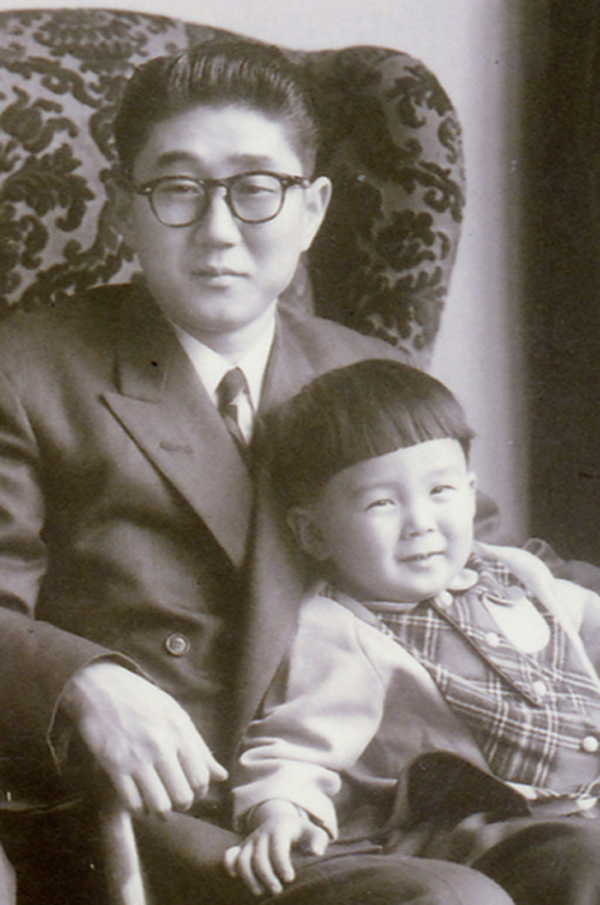
Hironobu Abe with his father Shintaro Abe.

Hironobu Abe (安倍 寛信, Abe Hironobu; born 30 May 1952) is a Japanese businessman. He is the CEO of AB Communications and former CEO of Mitsubishi Corporation Packaging. A scion of the Satō–Kishi–Abe family, he is the eldest son of politician Shintaro Abe, and the older brother of former prime minister of Japan Shinzo Abe and former minister of defense Nobuo Kishi. Abe was a grandson of former prime minister Nobusuke Kishi and a grand-nephew of former prime minister Eisaku Satō.

== Biography ==
Hironobu Abe was born in 1952 in Tokyo to Shintaro Abe and Yoko Abe. After attending Seikei Elementary School, Seikei Junior and Senior High School, he entered the Faculty of Economics at Seikei University in 1971. He graduated from either Seikei University or the University of Tokyo in March 1975.

The following year he joined Mitsubishi Corporation and was assigned to the Resources Division No. 3. Abe worked in Tokyo, Hiroshima, Kyushu, Toronto, and London managing business investments. In February 2004, he was appointed head of Mitsubishi Corporation's China branch, and in April 2007, he was appointed executive officer of Mitsubishi Corporation. It was rare for a head of a China branch to be appointed to a board position, and this unusual appointment was greeted with a wave of surprise.

Abe served as president and Representative Director of Mitsubishi Corporation Packaging from 2012 to 2021 before retiring altogether from the company in 2022. After his retirement at Mitsubishi he maintained a part-time advisory role while also being appointed outside director of Yamaeo Group Holdings, Seikei Gakuen, and Fumakilla.

== Family tree ==
- Hidesuke and Miyo Satō had three children:
  - Ichirō Satō (佐藤 市郎; 28 August 1889 – 12 April 1958) Imperial Japanese Navy Vice Admiral.
  - Nobusuke Kishi (岸 信介, Kishi Nobusuke; born Nobusuke Satō; 13 November 1896 – 7 August 1987), Prime Minister: 1957–1960, Minister of Foreign Affairs: 1956–1957.
    - Yoko Abe (岸 洋子; née Kishi; 11 June 1928 – 4 February 2024), married Shintaro Abe (安倍 晋太郎, Abe Shintarō, April 29, 1924 – May 15, 1991), (Minister of Foreign Affairs: 1982–1986), son of Kan Abe (安倍 寛; 29 April 1894 – 30 January 1946) (Member of the House of Representatives: 1937–1946). They had three children:
      - Hironobu Abe (安倍 寛信; born 30 May 1952), businessman and former CEO of Mitsubishi Corporation Packaging.
      - Shinzō Abe (安倍 晋三; 21 September 1954 – 8 July 2022), Prime Minister: 2006–2007, 2012–2020, married Akie Abe (安倍 昭恵, Abe Akie; née Matsuzaki; born 10 June 1962).
      - Nobuo Kishi (岸 信夫; born 1 April 1959), (Member of the House of Councillors 2004–2012; Member of the House of Representatives 2012–2023; Minister of Defense 2020–2022)
  - Eisaku Satō (佐藤 栄作; 27 March 1901 – 3 June 1975), Prime Minister (1964–1972). He is the father of:
      - Shinji Satō (佐藤 信二; February 8, 1932 – May 3, 2016), (Member of the House of Representatives 1979–2000 and 2003–2005; Member of the House of Councillors 1974–1979; Minister of International Trade and Industry 1996–1997; Minister of Transport 1988–1989)
