= Satō–Kishi–Abe family =

Political family in Japan

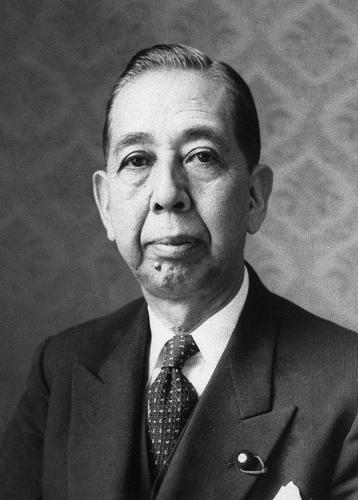
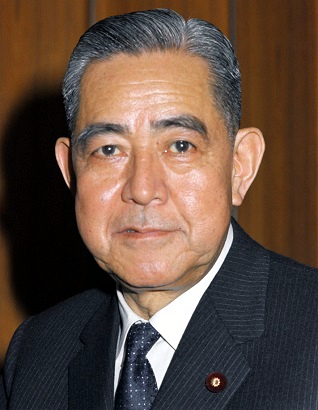
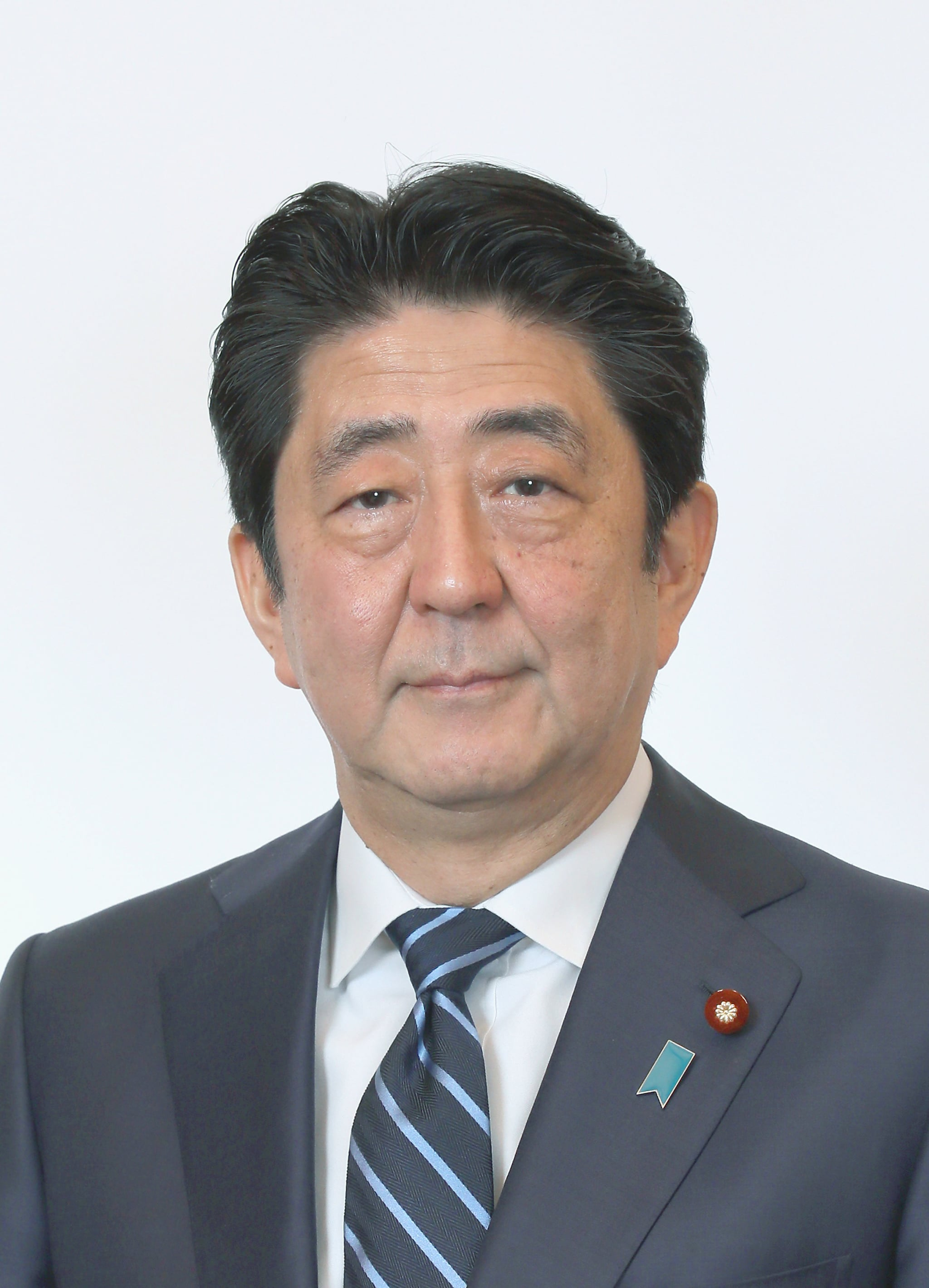
Japan's three prime ministers from the Satō–Kishi–Abe family and their length in office: Nobusuke Kishi, 3 years, 146 days; Eisaku Satō, 7 years, 242 days; and Shinzo Abe, 8 years, 267 days.

The Satō–Kishi–Abe family is a Japanese political family. It has produced three prime ministers: Nobusuke Kishi, Eisaku Satō, and Shinzo Abe, who combined have served as Prime Minister of Japan for over 20 years. Kishi led the Liberal Democratic Party (LDP) in its first election as a combined party. All politicians from the family continue to be associated with the LDP today.

== Family members ==
- Hidesuke and Moyo Satō had three children:
  - Ichirō Satō (佐藤 市郎; 28 August 1889 – 12 April 1958) Imperial Japanese Navy Vice Admiral.
  - Nobusuke Kishi (岸 信介, Kishi Nobusuke; born Nobusuke Satō; 13 November 1896 – 7 August 1987), Prime Minister: 1957–1960, Minister of Foreign Affairs: 1956–1957.
    - Yoko Abe (岸 洋子; née Kishi; 11 June 1928 – 4 February 2024), married Shintaro Abe (安倍 晋太郎, Abe Shintarō, April 29, 1924 – May 15, 1991), (Minister of Foreign Affairs: 1982–1986), son of Kan Abe (安倍 寛; 29 April 1894 – 30 January 1946) (Member of the House of Representatives: 1937–1946). They had three children:
      - Hironobu Abe (安倍 寛信; born 30 May 1952), businessman and former CEO of Mitsubishi Corporation Packaging.
      - Shinzō Abe (安倍 晋三; 21 September 1954 – 8 July 2022), Prime Minister: 2006–2007, 2012–2020, married Akie Abe (安倍 昭恵, Abe Akie; née Matsuzaki; born 10 June 1962).
      - Nobuo Kishi (岸 信夫; born 1 April 1959), (Member of the House of Councillors 2004–2012; Member of the House of Representatives 2012–2023; Minister of Defense 2020–2022)
        - Nobuchiyo Kishi (岸信千世; born 16 May 1991), Member of the House of Representatives 2023–present.
  - Eisaku Satō (佐藤 栄作; 27 March 1901 – 3 June 1975), Prime Minister (1964–1972). Married Hiroko Sato, niece and ward of Foreign Minister Yōsuke Matsuoka. Eisaku and Hiroko are the father of:
    - Shinji Satō (佐藤 信二; February 8, 1932 – May 3, 2016), (Member of the House of Representatives 1979–2000 and 2003–2005; Member of the House of Councillors 1974–1979; Minister of International Trade and Industry 1996–1997; Minister of Transport 1988–1989). His son-in-law is:
      - Masashi Adachi (阿達 雅志, b. September 27, 1959) Member of the House of Councilors 2016–present.

== Family tree ==
The family names come first in the following family tree, and Prime Ministers in bold:

Abe no Yoritoki; Heian-era ABE ancestor	Satō Tadanobu; Heian-era SATO ancestor	Marquess; Inoue Kaoru (Note: House of Peers) (great uncle to Tanabe)	Marquise; Inoue Sueko (niece and adopted daughter of Kaoru, and aunt of Tanabe)	Tanabe Yuzuru (Note: Yamaguchi 1st district (pre-1996) representative)	Nakako
Kishi Nobumasa	Kishi Yoshiko	Kishi Nobukazu
Kishi Yōzō
Satō Hidesuke (adopted by marriage)	Satō Ichirō
**Kishi Nobusuke** (Note: Yamaguchi 2nd district (1947–1993) representative) (adopted by marriage)	Abe Yōko	Kishi Nobuchiyo (Note: Yamaguchi 2nd district representative)
Satō Nobuhiko	Satō Moyo	**Satō Eisaku**(adopted by marriage)	Kishi Nobuo (Note: Yamaguchi councillor) (adopted son of Nobukazu)
Satō Ryūtarō	Adachi Masashi (Note: Councillors At-Large)	Kishi Tomohiro
(Kunihiro) Mine	Satō Matsusuke
Satō Hiroko	Satō Shinji (Note: National district (1947–1980) councillor) (Note: Yamaguchi 2nd district (1928–1942) representative) (Note: Chūgoku representative)	Mika
(Kunihiro) Oko	Fujie
Matsuoka Sanjūrō	Matsuoka Kensuke	Matsuoka Mitsuo	Matsuoka Masuo
Matsuoka Yōsuke	Morinaga Taichirō (great-grandfather of Akie)	Abe Akie
Yoshi
Abe Munenori	Abe Hidenori	**Abe Shinzō** (Note: Yamaguchi 4th district representative)
Tame
Abe Kan	Abe Hironobu	Abe Hiroto
Abe Hyōsuke (adopted by marriage)	Abe Shintarō
Hondō Tsunejiro	Sachiko	Mariko
Shizuko	Ushio Jirō
Viscount; Ōshima Yoshimasa	Hideko	Ushio Shirō	Ushio Miko

Parliamentary Districts:

== History ==
=== First generation of politicians ===
Ichirō Satō (1889–1958), Nobusuke Satō (1896–1987), and Eisaku Satō (1901–1975) were the sons of Hidesuke Satō and his wife, Moyo (her name could also be read as "Shigeyo"). Hidesuke was a businessman who had recently fallen on hard times but was from a once illustrious samurai family, claiming descent from Satō Tadanobu and, through him, the Fujiwara.

Hidesuke and Moyo were distant cousins, as Moyo was the granddaughter of Satō Nobuhiro, a samurai of the Chōshū Domain. Nobuhiro served as magistrate of the Hamada Domain and was the first governor of Shimane Prefecture after the Meiji Restoration's abolition of the han system. Nobuhiro was part of the Meiji oligarchy. He, along with other Choshu followers Itō Hirobumi, Inoue Kaoru, and Kido Takayoshi, formed much of Japan's post-Meiji government and held a disproportionately large influence, historically sending more prime ministers to the capital than any other region.

Through Moyo, the Satō have been tied to the Matsuoka family for several generations. This is because Moyo's brother married the sister of influential diplomat, Foreign Minister, and fellow Choshu descendant, Yōsuke Matsuoka, and Moyo's aunt had married Yosuke's father, Sanjuro, before dying without children. Through the Matsuoka, the Satō were related to the royal family through Kacho Haruko, who was the daughter of Marquis Fushiminomiya Hironobuo and Princess Kaninnomiya Hanako. Haruko was once considered as a potential match for Crown Prince Akihito. Haruko would end up marrying Yosuke's son Shinzo.

==== Ichirō Satō ====
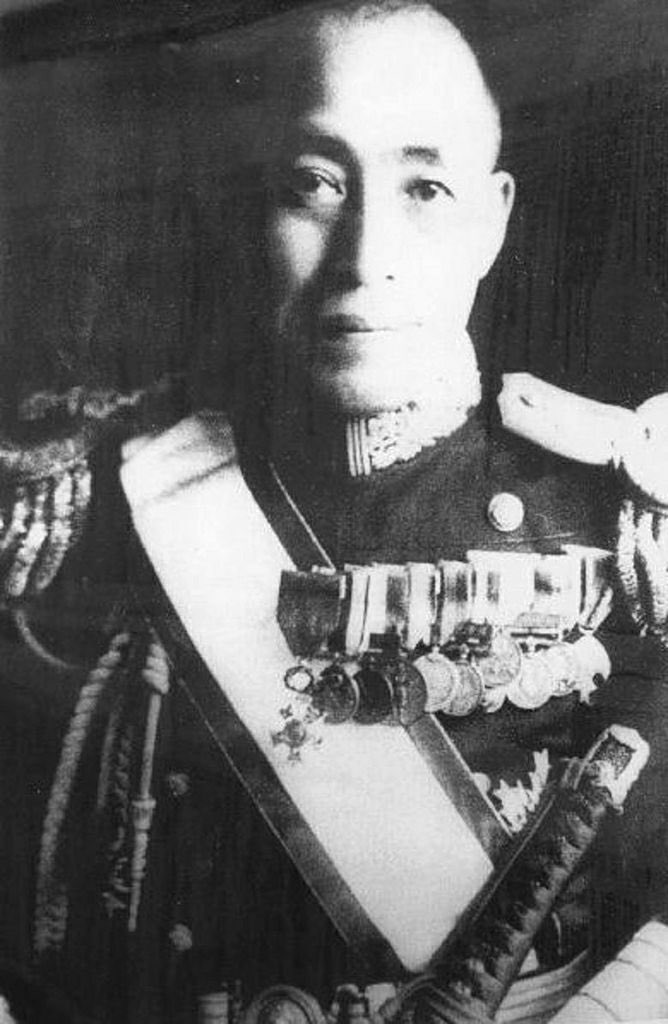
Ichirō Satō

Ichirō Satō graduated from the Naval Academy in 1908. From 1920, Satō was stationed in France, and in 1923, he was appointed as a staff officer in the General Staff of the Imperial Japanese Navy. In 1927, he represented the Imperial Japanese Navy at the Geneva Conference on Naval Disarmament, where he argued that the Japanese Navy was nothing more than a means of self-defense and that Japan could never afford to engage in a war with a great naval power. That same year, he became Chief of Staff of the Combined Fleet, and the following year, he was named Captain of the cruiser Nagara.

In 1929, Satō represented the Imperial Navy on the Permanent Military Advisory Committee to the League of Nations, and in 1930, he served as an IJN representative at the London Conference on Naval Disarmament. In 1932, he was appointed First Chief of the Education Bureau, Ministry of the Navy, and later served as vice principal of the Naval War College. In 1938, he was promoted to Vice Admiral and assigned to command the Japanese naval station at Port Arthur but was transferred to the reserves in 1940 due to ill health.

Upon his retirement, he was awarded the Order of the Rising Sun, Gold Rays with Neck Ribbon. Thereafter, he embarked on a second career as a naval historian, writing A Fifty-Year History of the Japanese Navy (1943). Satō died of uremia complicated by pneumonia on April 12, 1958.

==== Nobusuke Kishi ====
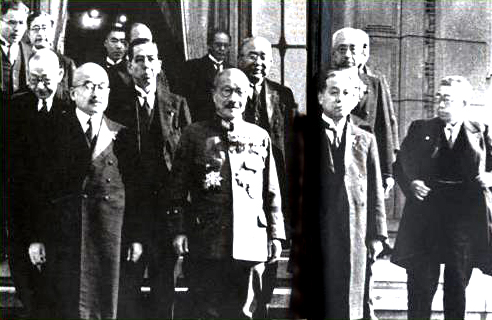
Cropped photo of the wartime Hideki Tōjō cabinet. Kishi is second from the left in the second row, just behind Tōjō's right shoulder.

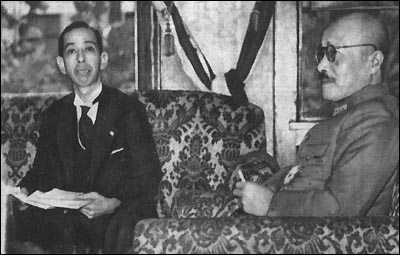
Hideki Tōjō (right) and Nobusuke Kishi, October 1943.

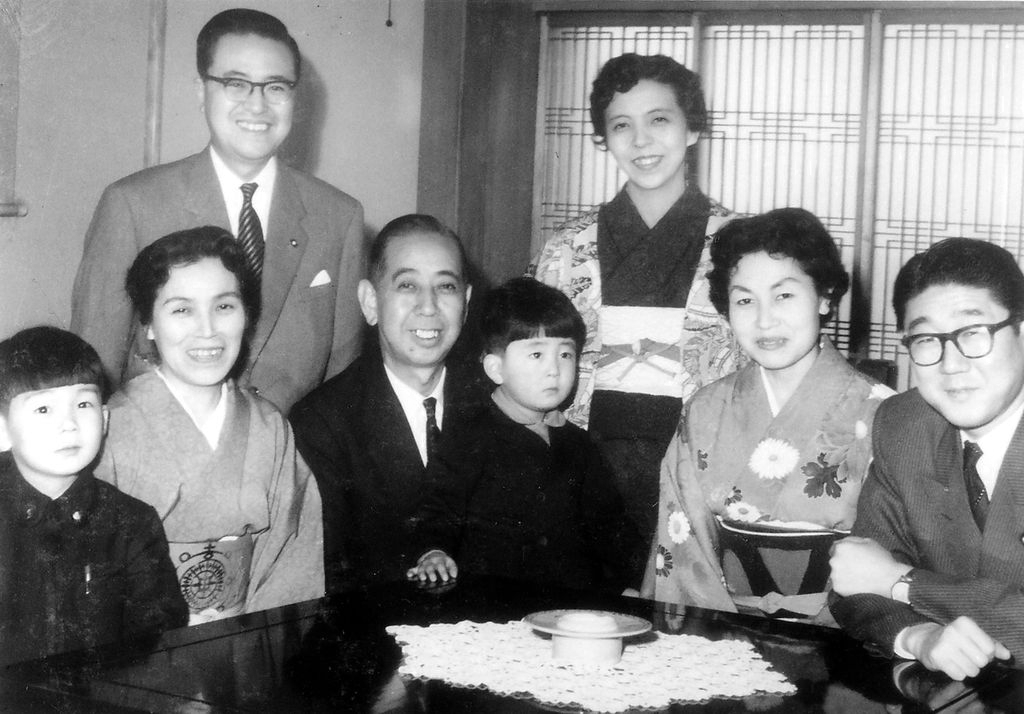
The Abe family, with Nobusuke Kishi and Shinzo Abe in the center.

Nobusuke Kishi, born Nobusuke Satō, was adopted by his uncle Nobumasa Kishi. As Nobumasa had no male heir, Nobusuke married his daughter Yoshiko and took her name. (Note: Japan practiced cognatic primogeniture, or male-line inheritance, at the time, in which the firstborn son would receive everything, leaving younger sons and daughters with nothing. Families with only daughters would marry one of their daughters to a second or third son, and in turn, the son would take their wife's name and be adopted as the heir.) Nobusuke passed the extremely difficult entrance examination to enter First High School in Tokyo, the most prestigious high school in the country. Afterwards, he attended Tokyo Imperial University (now the University of Tokyo), where he graduated from the Faculty of Law in 1920 at the top of his class and with the highest grades in the university's history. While at the university, Kishi became a protégé of the right-wing ultranationalist legal scholar Shinkichi Uesugi. Because he studied German law under Uesugi, Kishi's views tended toward that of typical German-style statism during the 1930s, which was in contrast to the more progressive approaches favored by some of his classmates who studied English law. Uesugi was so impressed by Kishi that he sought to make Kishi his successor as a professor in the University of Tokyo Faculty of Law, but Kishi declined. Instead, upon graduation, Kishi entered the Ministry of Commerce and Industry. In 1926–27, Kishi traveled around the world to study industry and industrial policy in various industrialized states around the world, such as the United States, Germany, and the Soviet Union. Kishi became known as one of the more prominent members of a group of "reform bureaucrats" within the Japanese government who favored a statist model of economic development with the state guiding and directing the economy.

Known for his exploitative rule of the Japanese puppet state of Manchukuo in Northeast China in the 1930s, Kishi was nicknamed the "Monster of the Shōwa era" (昭和の妖怪; Shōwa no yōkai). (Note: 岩見隆夫 (2012). 昭和の妖怪岸信介. 中央公論新社. ISBN 978-4122057234. (Note: The author Takao Iwami (under his pseudonym 田尻育三) originally used the nickname "Monster of Manchuria" in "Monster of Manchuria: A Study on Kishi Nobusuke", a piece he wrote for the magazine Bungei Shunjū (「満州の妖怪―岸信介研究」『文藝春秋』1977年11月号) and another piece for the same magazine the following year entitled "A Study on Kishi Nobusuke: The Postwar Period" (「岸信介研究—戦後編」『文藝春秋』1978年7月号), but when he subsequently published the two together in book form in 1979, he entitled it "Monster of Shōwa". Both phrases are inventions that can be traced back to Iwami and were not used by Kishi's contemporaries during his career. Of the two, the nickname that is actually used today is "Monster of Shōwa".))

Kishi has been described as the "mastermind" behind the industrial development of Japan's puppet state in Manchuria. Kishi had first come to the attention of the Kwantung Army officers as a rising star in the Ministry of Commerce and Industry for openly touting the policies of Nazi Germany and calling for policies of "industrial rationalization" to eliminate capitalist competition in support of state goals—ideas that accorded with the Army's idea of a "national defense state". In 1935, Kishi was appointed Manchukuo's Deputy Minister of Industrial Development. Kishi was given complete control of Manchukuo's economy by the military, with the authority to do whatever he liked just as long as industrial growth was increased.

In 1936, Kishi was one of the drafters of Manchukuo's first Five-Year Plan. Modeled on the Soviet Union's First Five-Year Plan, Manchukuo's Five-Year Plan was intended to dramatically boost heavy industry in order so that more coal, steel, and electricity could be used for military purposes. In order to enact the new plan, Kishi persuaded the military to allow private capital into Manchukuo. This was done by arguing that the military's policy use of state-owned corporations to lead Manchukuo's industrial development cost the Japanese state too much money. One of the new public-private corporations founded to assist in carrying out the Five-Year Plan was the Manchuria Industrial Development Company (MIDC). Established in 1937, it attracted a staggering 5.2 billion yen in private investment, making it by far the largest long-term investment in the Japanese empire. The sum was especially large when compared to Japan's annual government budget of 2.5 billion yen in 1937. The man handpicked by Kishi to lead the MIDC was his distant relative and First High School classmate, Nissan Group founder Ayukawa Yoshisuke. As part of the deal, the Nissan Group's entire operations were supposed to be transferred over to Manchuria to form the basis of the new MIDC. The system that Kishi pioneered in Manchuria of a state-guided economy where corporations made their investments on government orders later served as the model for Japan's post-1945 development and, subsequently, that of South Korea and China as well.

In order to make it profitable for the zaibatsu to invest in Manchukuo, Kishi had a policy of lowering the wages of the workers to the lowest possible point, even below the "line of necessary social reproduction". The purpose of Manchukuo was to provide the industrial basis for the "national defense state", with American historian Mark Driscoll noting that "Kishi's planned economy was geared towards production goals and profit taking, not competition with other Japanese firms; profit would come primarily from rationalizing labor costs as much as possible. The ne plus ultra of wage rationalization would be withholding pay altogether—that is, unremunerated forced labor." Accordingly, the Japanese conscripted hundreds of thousands of Chinese as slave labor to work in Manchukuo's heavy industrial plants. In 1937, Kishi signed a decree calling for the use of slave labor to be conscripted both in Manchukuo and in northern China, stating that in these "times of emergency" (i.e., war with China), industry needed to grow at all costs while guaranteeing healthy profits for state and private investors. From 1938 to 1944, an average of 1.5 million Chinese were taken every year to work as slaves in Manchukuo. The harsh conditions of Manchukuo were well illustrated by the Fushun coal mine, which at any given moment had about 40,000 men working as miners, of whom about 25,000 had to be replaced every year as their predecessors had died due to poor working conditions and low living standards.

Kishi showed little interest in upholding the rule of law in Manchukuo. Kishi expressed views typical of his fellow colonial bureaucrats when he disparagingly referred to the Chinese people as "lawless bandits" who were "incapable of governing themselves". According to Kishi's subordinates, he saw little point in following legal or juridical procedures because he felt the Chinese were more akin to dogs than human beings and would only understand brute force. According to Driscoll, Kishi always used the term "Manshū" to refer to Manchukuo, instead of "Manshūkoku", which reflected his viewpoint that Manchukuo was not actually a state, but rather just a region rich in resources to be used for Japan's benefit.

As a self-described "playboy of the Eastern world", Kishi was known during his four years in Manchukuo for his lavish spending amid much drinking, gambling, and womanizing. Kishi spent almost all of his time in Manchukuo's capital, Xinjing (modern Changchun, China), with the exception of monthly trips on the world-famous Asia Express railroad line to Dalian, where he indulged in his passion for women in alcohol- and sex-drenched weekends. When he was locked up in Sugamo prison in 1946 awaiting trial, he reminisced about his Manchukuo years: "I came so much, it was hard to clean it all up." According to Driscoll, "photographs and written descriptions of Kishi during this period never fail to depict a giddy exuberance: laughing and joking while doling out money during the day and looking forward to drinking and fornicating at night". Kishi was able to afford his hedonistic, free-spending lifestyle, as he had control over millions of yen with virtually no oversight, thanks to being deeply involved in and profiting from the opium trade. Before returning to Japan in October 1939, Kishi is reported to have advised his colleagues in the Manchukuo government about corruption: "Political funds should be accepted only after they have passed through a 'filter' and been 'cleansed'. If a problem arises, the 'filter' itself will then become the center of the affair, while the politician, who has consumed the 'clean water', will not be implicated. Political funds become the basis of corruption scandals only when they have not been sufficiently 'filtered.'"

Kishi later served in the wartime cabinet of Prime Minister Hideki Tōjō as Minister of Commerce and Vice Minister of Munitions and co-signed the declaration of war against the United States on December 7, 1941.

After World War II, Kishi was imprisoned for three years as a suspected Class A war criminal. However, the U.S. government did not charge, try, or convict him and eventually released him, as they considered Kishi to be the best man to lead a post-war Japan in a pro-American direction. With U.S. support, he went on to consolidate the Japanese conservative camp against perceived threats from the Japan Socialist Party in the 1950s. Kishi was instrumental in the formation of the powerful Liberal Democratic Party (LDP) through a merger of smaller conservative parties in 1955, and thus is credited with being a key player in the initiation of the "1955 System", the extended period during which the LDP was the overwhelmingly dominant political party in Japan.

As prime minister, Kishi's mishandling of the 1960 revision of the U.S.–Japan Security Treaty led to the massive 1960 Anpo protests, which were the largest protests in Japan's modern history and which forced him to resign in disgrace. Four years later, his younger brother Eisaku Satō became prime minister.

==== Eisaku Satō ====
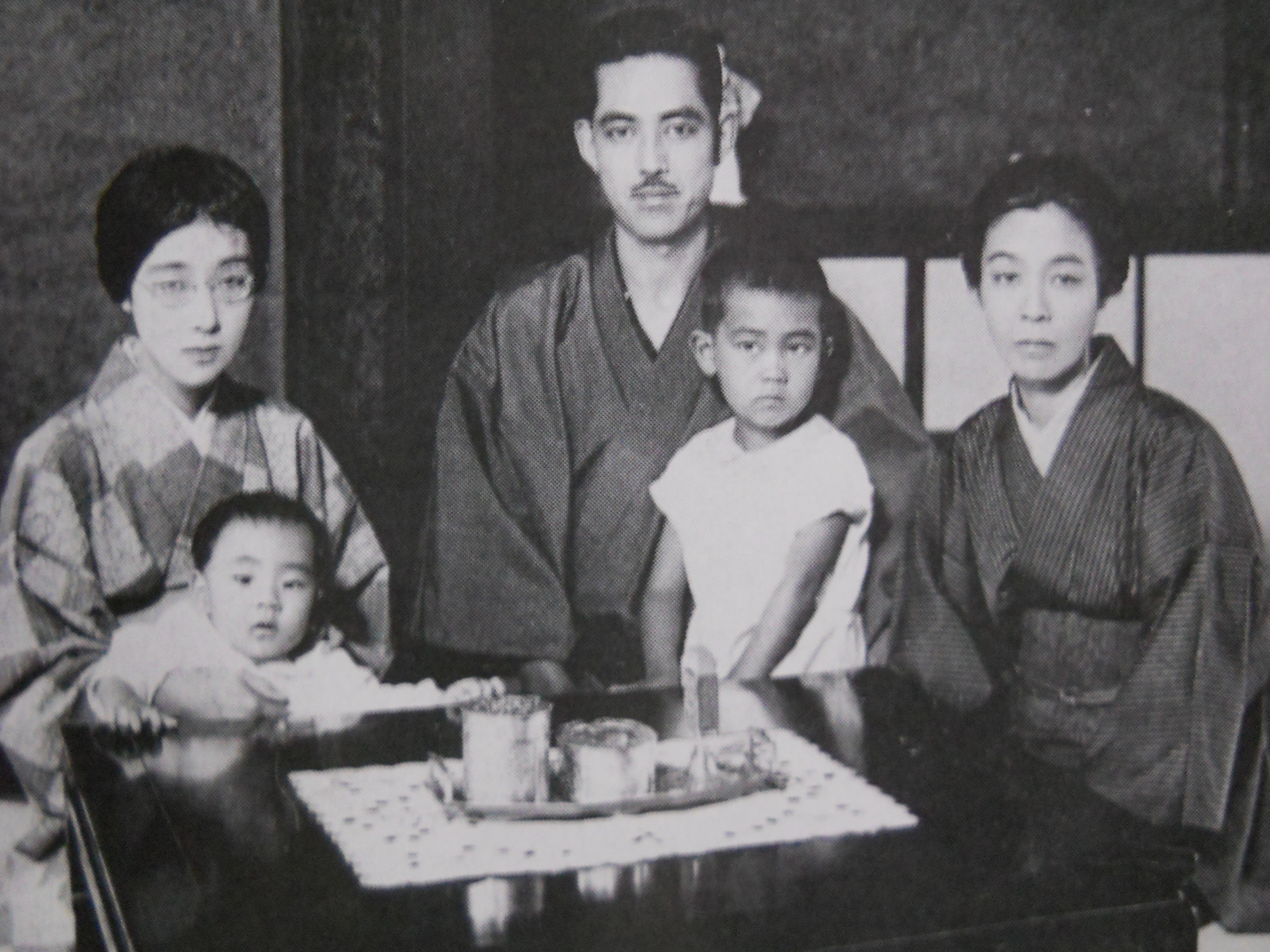
From left to right: Hiroko, Shinji, Eisaku, Ryūtarō, & Fujie (Matsuoka), 1931

Eisaku Satō studied German law at Tokyo Imperial University and, in 1923, passed the senior civil service examinations. Upon graduation the following year, he became a civil servant in the Ministry of Railways. Eisaku married Hiroko Satō (佐藤 寛子; 5 January 1907 – 16 April 1987) in 1926 and succeeded her father, Matsusuke Satō. Matsusuke was Eisaku's maternal uncle and the head of the main Satō family. After Matsusuke died in 1911, his wife and two daughters, Fujie, Hiroko, and Masako, were supported by diplomat Yōsuke Matsuoka, Fujie's brother. Eisaku and Hiroko had two sons, Ryūtarō and Shinji. Shinji followed his father into politics, serving in both houses and as a cabinet minister. Shinji's son-in-law, Masashi Adachi, currently serves in the House of Councillors and formerly worked as an aide for his cousin-in-law, Eisaku's grandnephew, Shinzo Abe. In a 1969 Shukan Asahi interview with novelist Shūsaku Endō, Hiroko accused Satō of being a rake and a wife-beater.

Satō served as Director of the Osaka Railways Bureau from 1944 to 1946 and Vice-Minister for Transport from 1947 to 1948.

Satō entered the Diet in 1949 as a member of the Liberal Party. He served as Minister of Postal Services and Telecommunications from July 1951 to July 1952. Satō gradually rose through the ranks of Japanese politics, becoming chief cabinet secretary to then prime minister Shigeru Yoshida from January 1953 to July 1954. He later served as minister of construction from October 1952 to February 1953.

After the Liberal Party merged with the Japan Democratic Party to form the Liberal Democratic Party, Satō served as chairman of the party executive council from December 1957 to June 1958, followed by a post as minister of finance in the cabinet of his brother Nobusuke Kishi from 1958 to 1960. As minister of finance, Satō requested the U.S. to fund conservatives.

Satō also served in the cabinets of Kishi's successor as prime minister, Hayato Ikeda. From July 1961 to July 1962, Satō was Minister of International Trade and Industry. From July 1963 to June 1964, he was concurrently head of the Hokkaidō Development Agency and of the Science and Technology Agency. In 1964 he succeeded Hayato Ikeda as prime minister, becoming the first prime minister to have been born in the 20th century and the second prime minister to come from his family.

As prime minister, Satō presided over a period of rapid economic growth. He would go on to serve the longest stint of any prime minister up until that time, and by the late 1960s, he appeared to have single-handed control over the entire Japanese government. He was a popular prime minister due to the growing economy; his foreign policy, which was a balancing act between the interests of the United States and China, was more tenuous. Student political radicalization led to numerous protests against Satō's support of the United States–Japan Security Treaty and Japanese tacit support for American military operations in Vietnam. This opposition peaked with the 1968–1969 Japanese university protests, which eventually forced Satō to close the prestigious University of Tokyo for a year in 1969.

Satō arranged for the formal return of Okinawa (Ryukyu Islands; occupied by the United States since the end of the Second World War) to Japanese control. He brought Japan into the Nuclear Non-Proliferation Treaty, for which he received the Nobel Peace Prize as a co-recipient in 1974. After three terms as prime minister, Satō decided not to run for a fourth. His heir apparent, Takeo Fukuda, won the Satō faction's support in the subsequent Diet elections, but the more popular MITI minister, Kakuei Tanaka, won the vote, ending the Satō faction's dominance.

==== Kan Abe ====
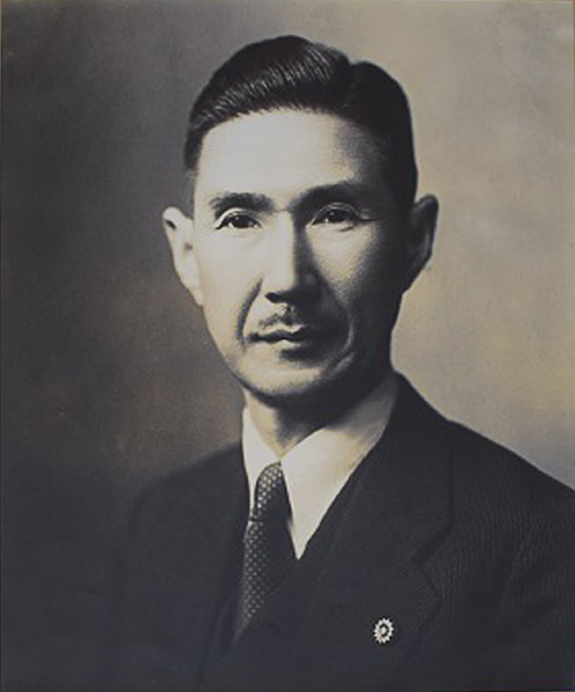
Kan Abe, father of Shintaro Abe

Kan Abe was born on 29 April 1894, in Heki (present-day Nagato), Yamaguchi Prefecture, the eldest son of Abe Hyōsuke and his wife Tame. The Abe family was a prominent family of landowners and sake and soy sauce brewers in Heki who had served as nanushi (village heads) in the Edo period. His father was from the Mukunoki family, a prominent family in Ōtsu, and was adopted into his wife's family upon marriage. Both his parents died by the time he was four, after which he was raised by his aunt Yoshi. Abe graduated from Tokyo Imperial University, the predecessor of the University of Tokyo.

Abe married Shizuko Hondo, the granddaughter of Viscount Ōshima Yoshimasa, which strengthened Abe's ties to the Meiji oligarchy and their influence within the government, giving him and his son Shintaro greater access to Satō, Kishi, and the halls of power. It is believed that Tame and her sister Yoshi were 40th generation descendants of the Heian era samurai Abe no Yoritoki through his son Abe no Munetō. This line with ties to the historic Mutsu Province was originally believed to be separate from the main Abe clan line, which claims descent from the legendary Emperor Kōgen; however, recent studies suggest they may indeed be distant relations.

Abe stood as a Seiyūkai Party candidate in the February 1928 general election but lost; he was appointed village mayor of Heki in 1933 and later served in the Yamaguchi prefectural assembly. He was elected to the House of Representatives as an independent candidate in the February 1937 general election. He earned the nickname "New Shōin" or "Shōwa Shōin" in honor of the earlier leader from Yamaguchi, Yoshida Shōin.

In the 1942 general election, he ran on a platform opposing the militarist government under Hideki Tojo, which had by this time taken away most powers from the Diet. The Tojo cabinet had attempted to block antiwar candidates from running through a registration system, notwithstanding which Abe won a Diet seat, which he used for an attempt to oust Tojo and end World War II. Abe was assisted in this effort by Takeo Miki, who became prime minister after the war. Abe died of a heart attack in January 1946 while preparing to run in the first post-war general election.

=== Second generation ===
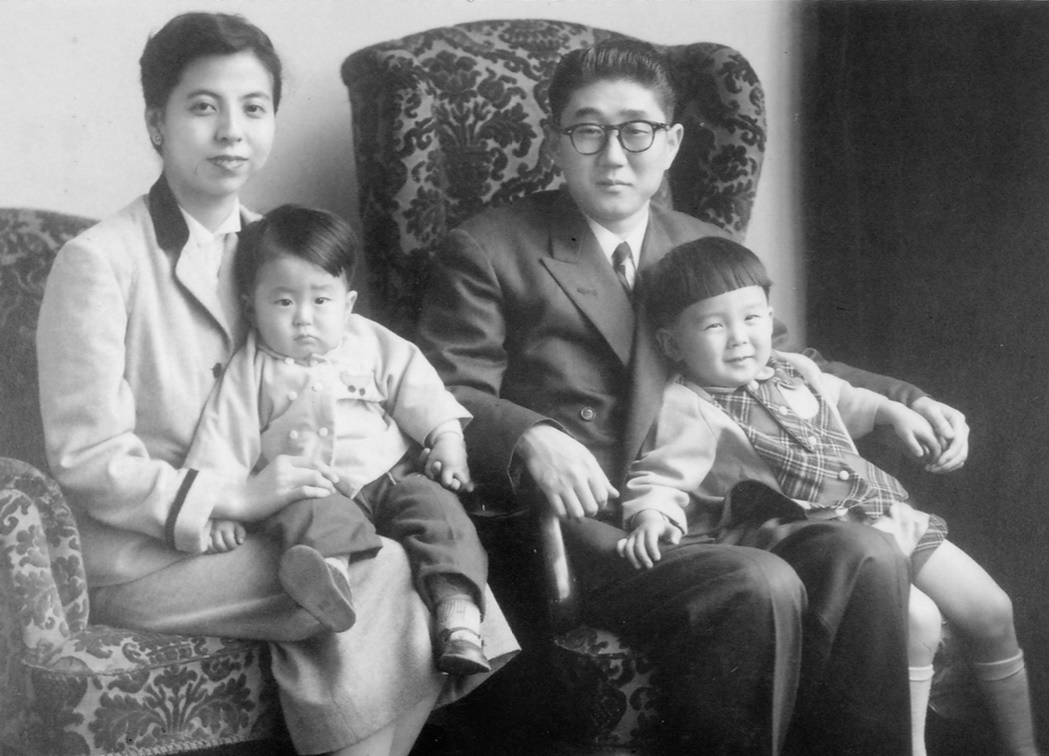
The Abe family in 1956 (left to right): Yōko, Shintaro, and their children Shinzo Abe and Hironobu Abe.

==== Yōko Abe ====
Yōko Kishi was born in 1928 as the eldest daughter of Nobusuke Kishi. She would go on to marry Shintaro Abe, becoming Yōko Abe. She was the mother of Hironobu Abe, Shinzo Abe, and Nobuo Kishi.

Known for her calligraphy, she was considered to be the "Godmother" of the Kishi–Abe family (a Japanese political family for three generations), and had long been the leader of the wives of members of Seiwa Seisaku Kenkyūkai. She was called the "Godmother of the World of Politics" because she had many followers in politics. Yōko Abe died on 4 February 2024, at the age of 95.

==== Shintaro Abe ====
Shintaro Abe was born on April 29, 1924, in Tokyo, the only son of politician and member of Parliament Kan Abe. He was raised in his father's home prefecture of Yamaguchi from soon after his birth. His mother was an army general's daughter. After graduating from high school in 1944 during World War II, Abe entered a naval aviation school and volunteered to become a kamikaze pilot. The war ended before he could undergo the required training. In 1949, he graduated from the Faculty of Law at the University of Tokyo and began his career as a political reporter for Mainichi Shimbun. He became a politician in 1957 when he started working as a legislative aide for his father-in-law, the then-prime minister Nobusuke Kishi. He won his father's seat in the House of Representatives in 1958.

He led a major LDP faction, the conservative Seiwa Seisaku Kenkyūkai, whose reins he took from former prime minister Takeo Fukuda in July 1986, and held a variety of ministerial and party posts, the former of which included Minister of Agriculture and Forestry and Minister of International Trade and Industry. Abe was named as Minister of International Trade and Industry in the cabinet of the then prime minister Zenkō Suzuki on November 30, 1981. During this period, he was seen as a young leader groomed for the future prime ministry. In November 1982, he was appointed Minister for Foreign Affairs in the cabinet of the then-prime minister Yasuhiro Nakasone, replacing Yoshio Sakurauchi. His term lasted until 1986.

Abe was a top contender to succeed Nakasone as prime minister in 1987 until he stepped aside for Noboru Takeshita, head of a powerful rival faction. Then, he was given the post of secretary general of the party in 1987. In 1988, his chances of becoming prime minister sometime in the near future were again thwarted when his name became associated with the Recruit-Cosmos insider-trading stock scandal, which brought down Takeshita and forced Abe to resign as the party's secretary general in December 1988. Shintaro Abe was hospitalized in January 1991. He died at Tokyo's Juntendo University Hospital on May 15, 1991, aged 67. The cause of death was heart failure.

==== Shinji Satō ====
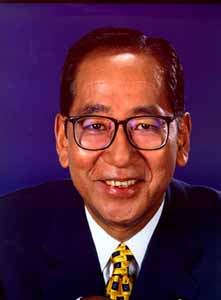
Shinji Satō

Shinji Satō (佐藤 信二 Satō Shinji, February 8, 1932 – May 3, 2016) was a Japanese politician who served as a member of the House of Representatives (1979–2000 and 2003–2005) and House of Councillors (1974–1979), as Minister of International Trade and Industry (1996–1997), and as Minister of Transport (1988–1989). He was the second son of Prime Minister Eisaku Satō. Satō announced in 2012 that he had a document signed between his father and U.S. President Richard Nixon that would allow American nuclear weapons to be brought to Okinawa in emergencies.

=== Third generation ===
==== Hironobu Abe ====
Hironobu Abe (安倍 寛信; born May 30, 1952) is a Japanese businessman. He is the CEO of AB Communications and former CEO of Mitsubishi Corporation Packaging. A scion of the Satō–Kishi–Abe family, he is the eldest son of politician Shintaro Abe and the older brother of former Prime Minister of Japan Shinzo Abe and former Minister of Defense Nobuo Kishi. Abe was a grandson of former prime minister Nobusuke Kishi and a grand-nephew of former prime minister Eisaku Satō.

Hironobu Abe was born in 1952 in Tokyo to Shintaro Abe and Yoko Abe. After attending Seikei Elementary School and Seikei Junior and Senior High School, he entered the Faculty of Economics at Seikei University in 1971. He graduated from either Seikei University or the University of Tokyo in March 1975. The following year he joined Mitsubishi Corporation and was assigned to the Resources Division No. 3. Abe worked in Tokyo, Hiroshima, Kyushu, Toronto, and London managing business investments. In February 2004, he was appointed head of Mitsubishi Corporation's China branch, and in April 2007, he was appointed executive officer of Mitsubishi Corporation. It was rare for a head of a China branch to be appointed to a board position, and this unusual appointment was greeted with a wave of surprise.

Abe served as president and representative director of Mitsubishi Corporation Packaging from 2012 to 2021 before retiring altogether from the company in 2022. After his retirement at Mitsubishi, he maintained a part-time advisory role while also being appointed outside director of Yamaeo Group Holdings, Seikei Gakuen, and Fumakilla.

==== Shinzo Abe ====
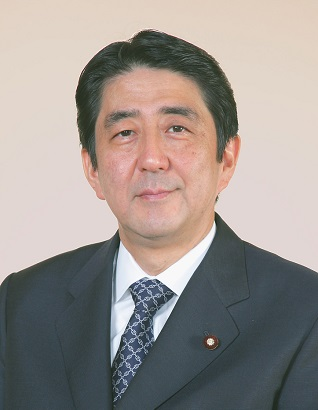
Abe in 2006. He was the youngest prime minister since Fumimaro Konoe in 1941.

Shinzo Abe (Japanese: 安倍 晋三, Hepburn: Abe Shinzō, IPA: [abe ɕindzoː]; 21 September 1954 – 8 July 2022) was the longest-serving prime minister in Japanese history, serving for almost nine years in total. He served as Prime Minister of Japan and President of the Liberal Democratic Party (LDP) from 2006 to 2007 and again from 2012 to 2020. Abe also served as Chief Cabinet Secretary from 2005 to 2006 under Junichiro Koizumi and was briefly the opposition leader in 2012.

After graduating from Seikei University and briefly attending the University of Southern California, Abe was elected to the Japanese House of Representatives in the 1993 election. Abe was appointed Chief Cabinet Secretary by Prime Minister Koizumi in 2005 before replacing him as prime minister and LDP president the following year. Confirmed by the National Diet, Abe became Japan's youngest post-war prime minister and the first born after World War II. Abe resigned as prime minister a year later due to ulcerative colitis and his party's recent election losses. After recovering, Abe staged an unexpected political comeback by defeating Shigeru Ishiba, the former defense minister, to become LDP president in 2012. Following the LDP's landslide victory in that year's general election, Abe became the first former prime minister to return to office since Shigeru Yoshida in 1948. He led the LDP to further victories in the 2014 and 2017 elections, becoming Japan's longest-serving prime minister. In 2020, Abe again resigned as prime minister, citing a relapse of his colitis, and was succeeded by Yoshihide Suga.

Abe was a staunch conservative and associated with the Nippon Kaigi, which holds negationist views on Japanese history, including denying the role of government coercion in the recruitment of comfort women during World War II, a position that caused tensions particularly with South Korea. Under his premiership, Japan–South Korea relations further strained in 2019 over disputes about reparations. Earlier that same year, Abe's government initiated a trade dispute with South Korea after the South Korean Supreme Court ruled that reparations be made by Japanese companies that had benefited from forced labor. Abe was considered a hard-liner with respect to Japan's military policies. In 2007, he initiated the Quadrilateral Security Dialogue during his first tenure as prime minister, aimed at resisting China's rise as a superpower. He advocated for amending Article 9 of the Japanese Constitution to legally codify the status of the Japan Self-Defense Forces (JSDF). However, this was never achieved during his lifetime. He enacted the Legislation for Peace and Security in 2015 that allowed Japan to exercise collective security by allowing JSDF deployments overseas, the passage of which was controversial and met with protests. Economically, Abe attempted to counter Japan's economic stagnation with "Abenomics", with mixed results. He was also credited with reinstating the Trans-Pacific Partnership with the Comprehensive and Progressive Agreement for Trans-Pacific Partnership.

On 8 July 2022, Abe was assassinated while delivering a campaign speech in Nara two days before the 10 July upper house elections. The suspect, Tetsuya Yamagami, who was immediately arrested by Japanese police, confessed to targeting the former prime minister because of Abe's reported ties with the Unification Church. This was the first assassination of a former Japanese prime minister since 1936. A polarizing figure in Japanese politics, Abe was described by supporters as having worked to strengthen Japan's security and international stature, while opponents described his nationalistic policies and negationist views on history as threatening Japanese pacifism and damaging relations with East Asian neighbors, including China and South Korea.

==== Akie Abe ====
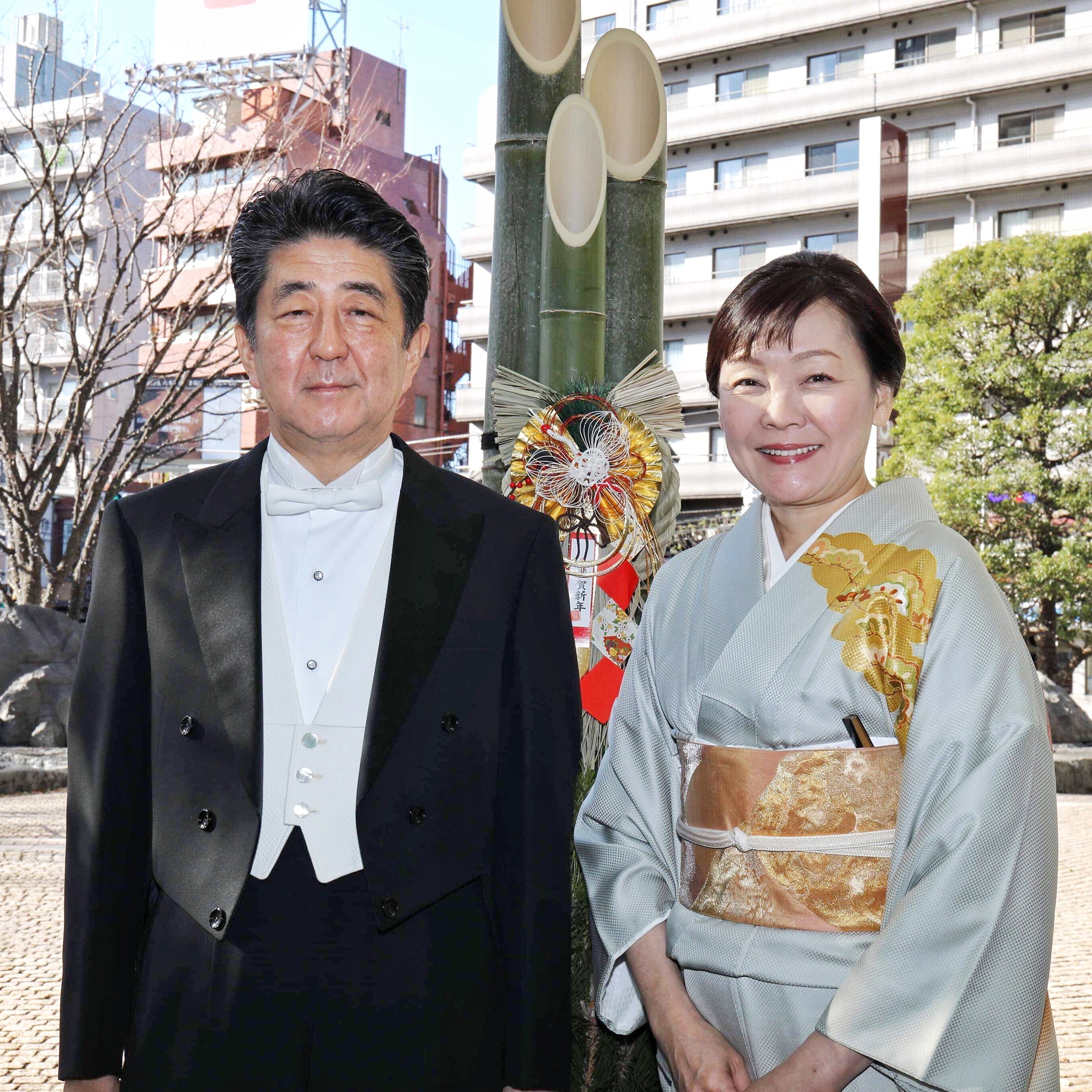
Akie with Shinzo Abe, 1 January 2020

Akie Matsuzaki (松崎 昭恵, Matsuzaki Akie) was born on 10 June 1962. She is from a wealthy Japanese family; her father is the former president of Morinaga & Co., one of Japan's largest confectionery companies. She was educated at Sacred Heart School in Tokyo (or Seishin Joshi Gakuin), a Roman Catholic private elementary through high school, then graduated from Sacred Heart Professional Training College. Akie later worked for Dentsu Inc., the world's largest advertising agency, before marrying Shinzo Abe in 1987. After this, she became known as Akie Abe. The couple had no children, having undergone unsuccessful fertility treatments earlier in their marriage. The two would remain married until Shinzo's assassination on 8 July 2022.

In the late 1990s, Akie worked as a radio disc jockey in her husband's hometown of Shimonoseki. She was popular in the broadcast area and was known by her jockey name, "Akky".

Following her husband's first stint as prime minister, she opened an organic izakaya in the Kanda district of Tokyo but was not active in management due to the urging of her mother-in-law. She received a master's degree in Social Design Studies from Rikkyo University in March 2011.

Akie became popularly known as the "domestic opposition party" due to her outspoken views, which often contradicted her husband's. Akie is also known as a supporter of sexual minorities and the LGBT community. On April 27, 2014, she joined the gay pride parade in Tokyo to show her support for broader rights for Japan's LGBT community. In 2015, she was photographed standing in a field of cannabis plants promoting the revival of the cannabis culture in Japan.

While her husband was in office, Akie developed a close relationship with the Moritomo Gakuen kindergarten in Osaka, which is noted for its conservative and militarist culture, including requiring students to memorize the Imperial Rescript on Education. Akie was named as honorary principal of Mizuho no Kuni, an elementary school under development by Moritomo Gakuen, but resigned in February 2017 after it was discovered that Moritomo Gakuen had purchased the land for the school from the government for 14% of its appraised value. The Moritomo Gakuen scandal highlighted the complicated role of the prime minister's wife in Japan: although Akie herself was not considered a civil servant, she was supported by a staff of five civil servants seconded from the Ministry of Foreign Affairs and the Ministry of Economy, Trade and Industry, thus implying that her role carries public duties.

Akie was the first spouse of a Japanese prime minister to actively use social media and was particularly personally active on Facebook and Instagram, but dramatically reduced her social media activities and changed the style of her posts in the wake of the Moritomo Gakuen scandal.

==== Nobuo Kishi ====
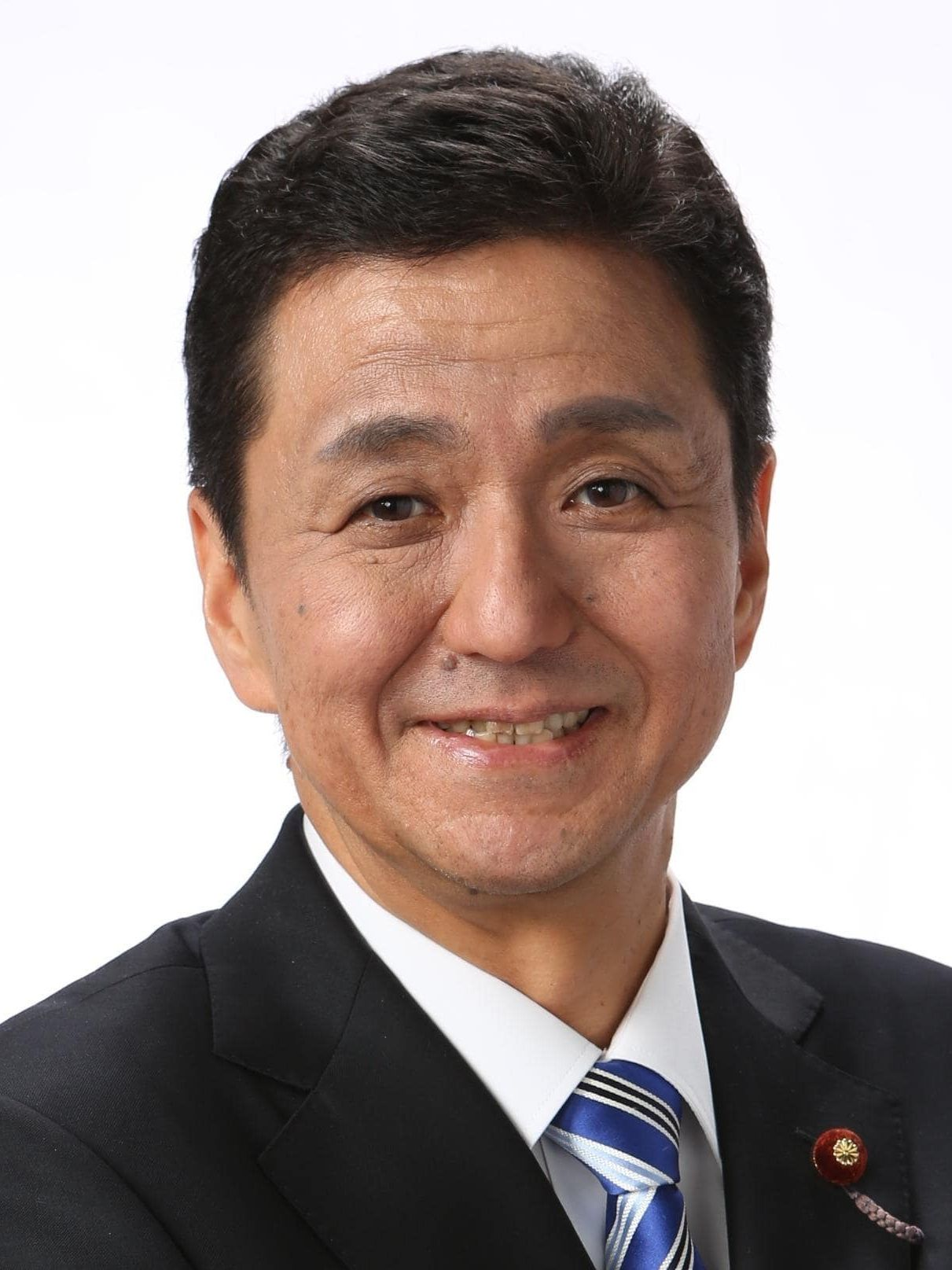
Nobuo Kishi

Nobuo Kishi sat in the House of Representatives from 2012 to 2023, representing Yamaguchi's 2nd District as a member of the Liberal Democratic Party. From September 2020 to August 2022, he served as the Minister of Defense. He is the younger brother of Shinzo Abe. Shortly after his birth, he was adopted by his maternal uncle, Seibu Oil chairman Nobukazu Kishi, who could not have children of his own. He did not know about his actual parentage or his relationship with Shintaro Abe's other sons, Hironobu and Shinzo, until he was preparing to enter university.

Kishi spent the first decade of his life living in Tokyo with his grandfather, former prime minister Nobusuke Kishi. He graduated from the Faculty of Economics at Keio University in 1981 and joined Sumitomo Corporation, where he worked until 2002. His postings included the United States, Vietnam, and Australia.

With his brother Abe's backing, Kishi was elected to the House of Councillors in 2004, representing Yamaguchi Prefecture. He became known as a specialist in security issues. He has served as Parliamentary Secretary for Defense (Fukuda and Aso Cabinet), Vice Chairman of the LDP Diet Affairs Committee in the House of Councillors, Vice Chairman of the Party Organization and Campaign Headquarters of LDP, and Chairman of the Special Committee on Okinawa and Northern Problems.

Kishi was elected to the House of Representatives in the 2012 Japanese general election after resigning from his House of Councillors seat. He retook a seat in Yamaguchi Prefecture that had previously belonged to his grandfather Nobusuke Kishi and great-uncle Eisaku Satō but that had been lost to the Democratic Party of Japan in the 2009 Japanese general election. Following the 2012 election, Kishi's brother Abe became prime minister. Kishi was promoted to Senior Vice Foreign Minister in 2013.

Kishi became known during this time for his role in promoting Japan–Taiwan relations. He helped to arrange an historic meeting between Prime Minister Abe and ROC opposition leader Tsai Ing-wen in 2015. After Tsai's re-election as president, Kishi met with Tsai in Taiwan in January 2020 and again in July 2020 (when he attended the funeral of President Lee Teng-hui). In 2019, he publicly advocated for Japan acquiring strike capabilities as a defensive measure against North Korea, stating that Japan should not rely upon the United States for defense.

Kishi was appointed as minister of defense under Prime Minister Yoshihide Suga in September 2020. Commentator Michael Bosack described this as "a strange pick that signals factional influence and possibly a personal favor", and argued that the faction led by Hiroyuki Hosoda was clearly trying to build Kishi's credentials. Following the news of Kishi's appointment, a Chinese foreign ministry spokesman expressed hope that Japan would refrain from developing official ties with Taiwan.

In October 2020, Kishi released a joint statement with Australian Minister of Defense Linda Reynolds that announced that Japan's Self Defense Forces would be enabled to protect Australian military assets, an act that was made legal in September 2015 through the "Peace and Security Preservation Legislation" passed under the Abe administration. This makes Australia the second country (after the United States) whose assets Japan would be permitted to protect. Kishi and Reynolds also emphasized their opposition to "any destabilizing or coercive unilateral actions that could alter the status quo and increase tensions in the East China Sea", and some analysts have speculated this to be in reference to Chinese maritime activities around the Senkaku Islands. In a September 2021 interview with the Mainichi Shimbun, Kishi stated that Japan cannot stand aside when events occur in Taiwan due to being close neighbors and allies with shared universal values such as freedom and democracy. In 2021, he visited the controversial Yasukuni Shrine, making him the first sitting defense minister to do so since 2016. In response, the South Korean Foreign Ministry described his visit as "deplorable".

After Suga's resignation as prime minister, his successor, Fumio Kishida, opted to retain Kishi as defense minister after taking office in October 2021. Nikkei noted that this sent a message of continuity in Japan's policies toward China and Taiwan.

After the assassination of Shinzo Abe on 8 July 2022, Nobuo Kishi had to disclose that the relationship with the controversial Unification Church, also known as the "Moon Sect", extends to him. Kishi acknowledged that members of the group participated as volunteers in his campaign activities, including tasks such as telephone campaigning. Kishida replaced him as defense minister a month later. He announced plans to resign from the House of Representatives due to health issues, making way for a by-election on April 23, 2023.

==== Masashi Adachi ====
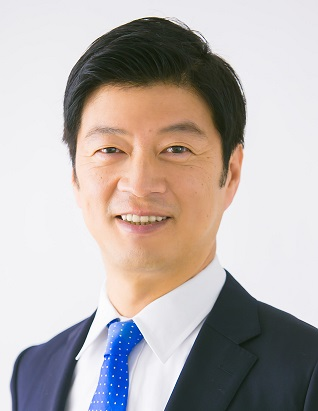
Masashi Adachi, son-in-law of Shinji Satō

Masashi Adachi (阿達 雅志 Adachi Masashi, b. September 27, 1959) is a Japanese politician who serves as a member of the House of Councillors and as a State Minister for Internal Affairs and Communications.

Adachi was born in Sakyo-ku, Kyoto, and grew up in Fukui, Sakai, and Takatsuki. He graduated from the University of Tokyo and joined Sumitomo Corporation in 1983, where he worked on railcar exports to the United States. He obtained an MCJ and LLM from the New York University School of Law in 1993 and became qualified as a lawyer in New York. He thereafter worked in the legal department of Sumitomo and in the executive office of its Chinese subsidiary. He left Sumitomo in 2000 and thereafter worked for his father-in-law, Shinji Satō, from 2003 to 2004. He then worked for the law firm of Paul Weiss in Tokyo from 2004 to 2014.

He ran as a Liberal Democratic Party candidate for the House of Councillors in the 2007 election but lost. He joined the law school faculty of Nihon University as an adjunct professor in 2008. He again ran as an LDP candidate in the 2010 House of Councillors election and lost.

He finally entered the House of Councillors as a runner-up after Yukari Satō resigned in December 2014 to run in the 2014 Japanese general election and won re-election in the 2016 House of Councillors election.

He was appointed as a vice-minister for the Cabinet Office and Ministry of Land, Infrastructure, Transport and Tourism in 2018 under Prime Minister Shinzo Abe.

=== Fourth generation ===
==== Nobuchiyo Kishi ====
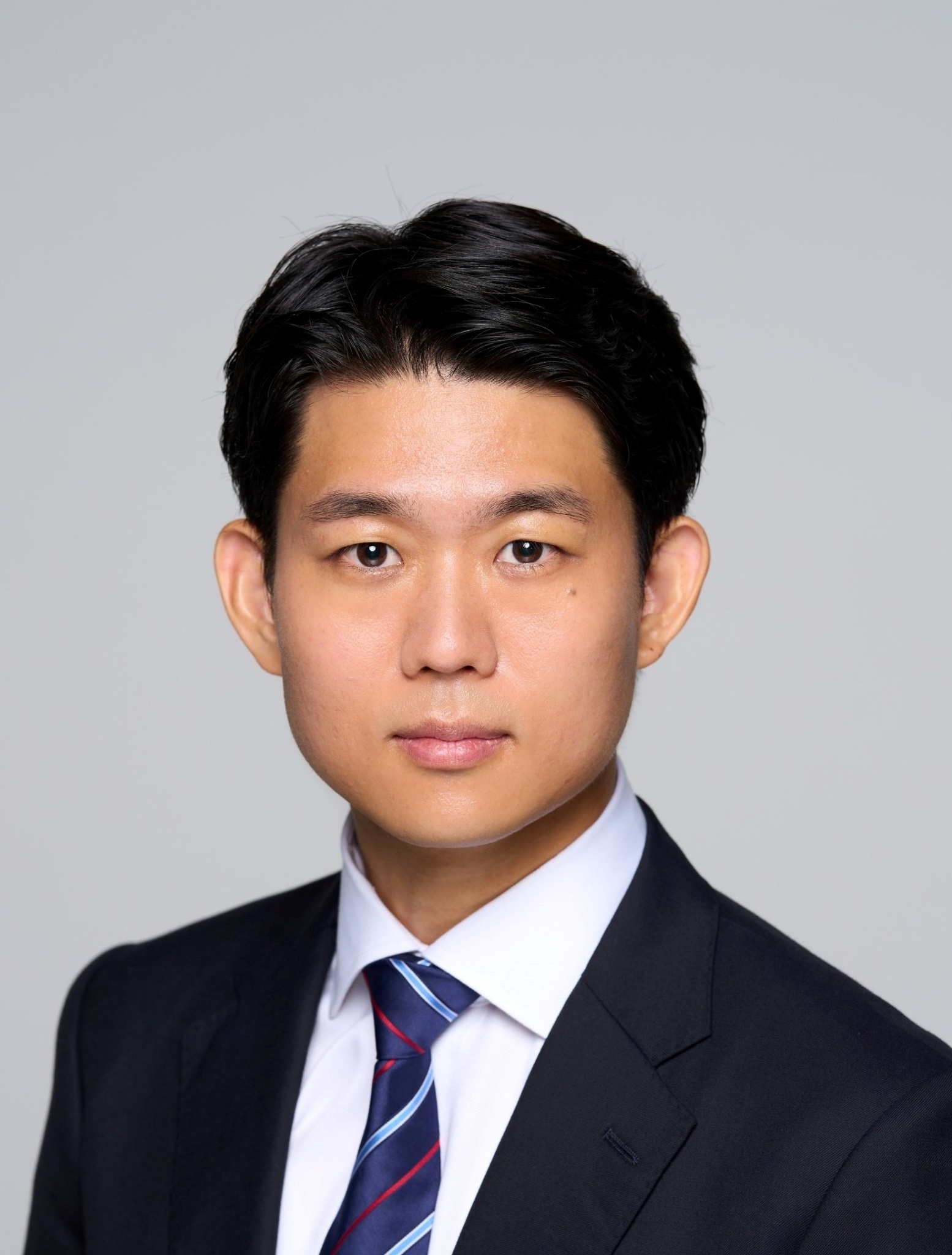
Nobuchiyo Kishi

Nobuchiyo Kishi (岸信千世, b. May 16, 1991) is a Japanese politician and son of Nobuo Kishi. He serves as a member of the House of Representatives and Parliamentary Vice-Minister for Digital Affairs and Parliamentary Vice-Minister for the Cabinet Office.

Born in the United States, where his father was posted while working for the Sumitomo Corporation, Nobuchiyo grew up in Tokyo and graduated from Keio University in 2014. Following college, he worked at Fuji Television as a reporter in the news bureau. When his father Nobuo became Minister of Defense in 2020, he joined his father's staff as an aide. When Nobuo stepped down as defense minister and retired from politics in February 2023, Nobuchiyo decided to follow in his father's footsteps and run for his father's former seat representing the Yamaguchi 2nd district, a seat previously held by his great-grandfather Nobusuke and, through redistricting, shared by various members of the family for almost 100 years over the course of 5 generations. He would win the seat in the by-election in April with 61,369 votes, 52.47% of the total votes cast, becoming the youngest member of the majority LDP in Diet and only the third Diet member born in the Heisei era.

He would be appointed to the vice minister role in Ishiba's cabinet following his re-election, securing his seat with 104,885 votes in the 2024 Japanese general election.
