= Ken'ichirō =

- Gender: Male

Origin
- Origin: Japanese
- Meaning: Different meanings depending on the kanji used

Ken'ichirō, Kenichirō, Kenichiro or Kenichirou (written: 健一郎, 兼一郎, 賢一郎 or 研一郎) is a masculine Japanese given name. Notable people with the name include:

- Ken'ichiro Arai (新井 健一郎; born 1972), Japanese professional wrestler
- Kenichiro Fukui (福井 健一郎; born 1970), Japanese video game composer and electronic musician
- Kenichiro Fumita (文田 健一郎; born 1995), Japanese sport wrestler
- Ken-Ichiro Kobayashi (小林 研一郎; born 1940), Japanese conductor and composer
- Kenichirou Matsuda (松田 健一郎; born 1978), Japanese voice actor
- Kenichiro Matsuoka (松岡 謙一郎; born 1914), Japanese media executive.
- Kenichiro Meta (米田 兼一郎; born 1982), Japanese footballer
- Kenichiro Tokura (戸倉 健一郎; born 1971), Japanese footballer
- Kenichiro Ueno (上野 賢一郎; born 1965), Japanese politician
- KENN (real name Kenichirō Ōhashi (大橋 賢一郎; born 1982), Japanese voice actor and singer
