= Nobuchiyo Kishi =

Japanese politician (born 1991)

- 岸 信千世
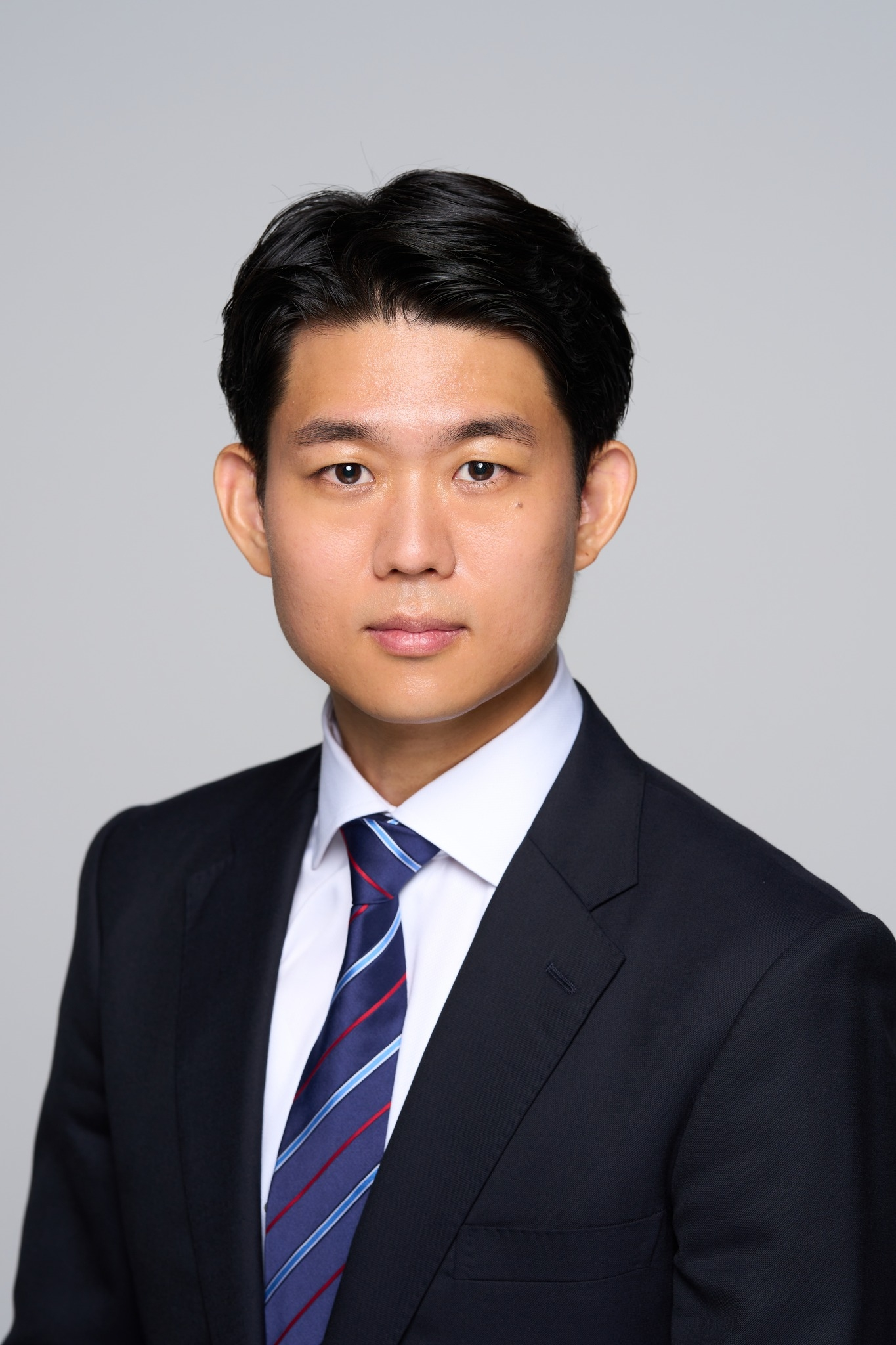
- Official portrait, 2023

Member of the House of Representatives
- Incumbent
- Assumed office 25 April 2023
- Preceded by: Nobuo Kishi
- Constituency: Yamaguchi 2nd

Personal details
- Born: 16 May 1991 (age 35) United States
- Party: Liberal Democratic
- Parents: Nobuo Kishi (father); Chikako Kishi (mother)
- Relatives: Satō–Kishi–Abe family
- Education: Keio University

Nobuchiyo Kishi (岸信千世, Kishi Nobuchiyo; born 16 May 1991) is a Japanese politician serving as a member of the House of Representatives since 2023. He is the son of Nobuo Kishi, the nephew of Shinzo Abe, and the great-grandson of Nobusuke Kishi.
