= Shinji Satō =

Japanese politician (1932–2016)

- 佐藤 信二
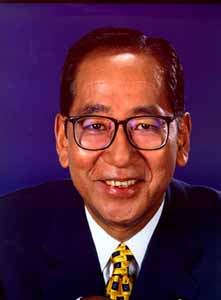
- Official portrait, 1996

Minister of International Trade and Industry
- In office 7 November 1996 – 11 September 1997
- Prime Minister: Ryutaro Hashimoto
- Preceded by: Shunpei Tsukahara
- Succeeded by: Mitsuo Horiuchi

Minister of Transport
- In office 27 December 1988 – 3 June 1989
- Prime Minister: Noboru Takeshita
- Preceded by: Shintaro Ishihara
- Succeeded by: Shinjirō Yamamura

Member of the House of Representatives
- In office 9 November 2003 – 8 August 2005
- Constituency: Chūgoku PR
- In office 7 October 1979 – 2 June 2000
- Preceded by: Nobusuke Kishi
- Succeeded by: Hideo Hiraoka
- Constituency: Former Yamaguchi 2nd (1979–1996); Yamaguchi 2nd (1996–2000)

Member of the House of Councillors
- In office 8 July 1974 – 16 September 1979
- Preceded by: Multi-member district
- Succeeded by: Constituency abolished (1980)
- Constituency: National district

Personal details
- Born: 8 February 1932 Tabuse, Yamaguchi, Japan
- Died: 3 May 2016 (aged 84) Setagaya, Tokyo, Japan
- Party: Liberal Democratic
- Parent: Eisaku Satō (father)
- Relatives: Satō–Kishi–Abe family
- Education: Keio University

Shinji Satō (佐藤 信二 Satō Shinji, 8 February 1932 – 3 May 2016) was a Japanese politician who was minister of transport from 1988 to 1989, and Minister of International Trade and Industry from 1996 to 1997. He was also a member of the House of Councillors from 1974 to 1979, and a member of the House of Representatives from 1979 to 2000 and again from 2003 to 2005. He was member of the Liberal Democratic Party. A member of the Satō-Kishi-Abe family, he was the second son of Prime Minister Eisaku Satō.

== Biography ==
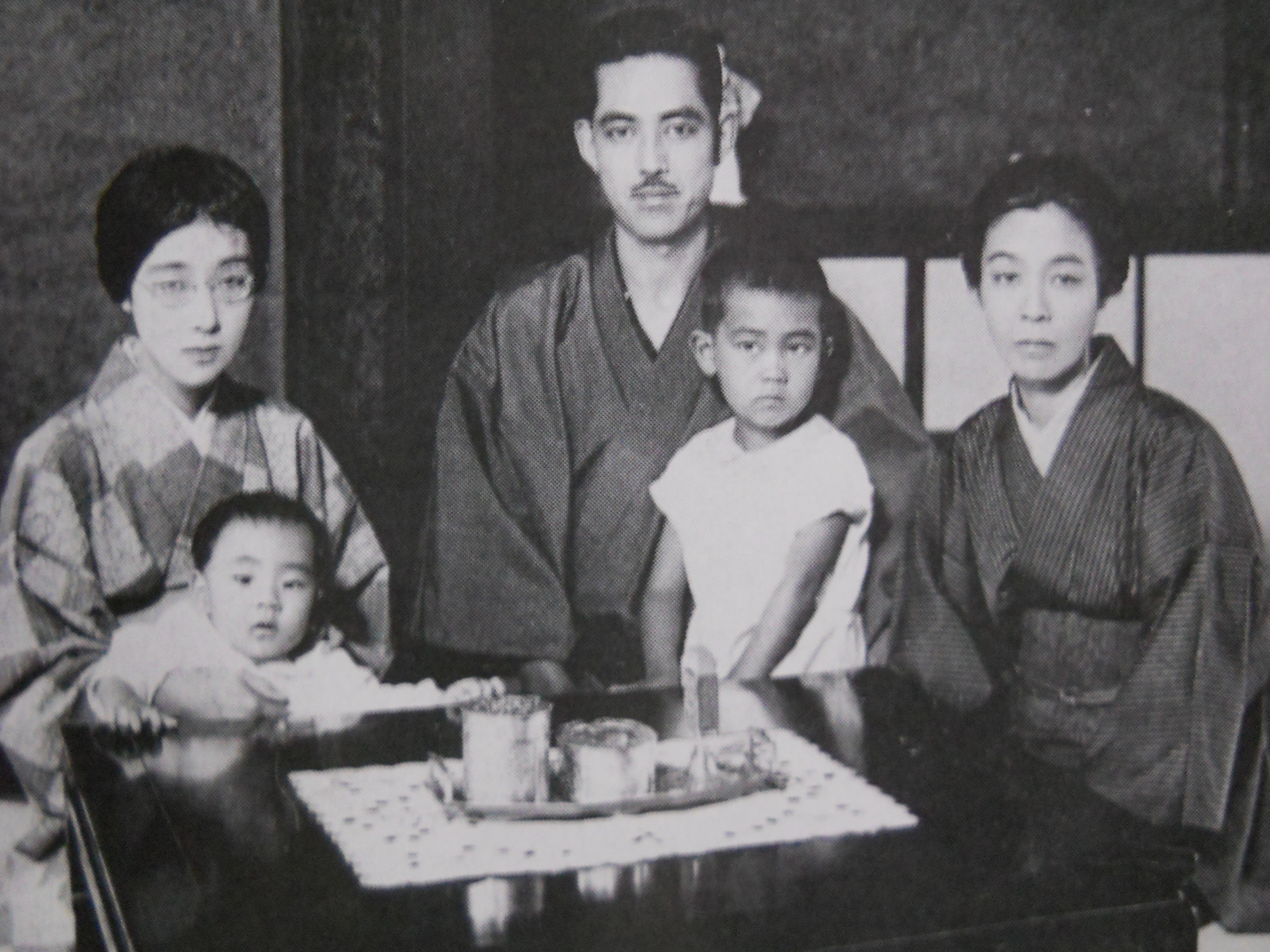
From left - Hiroko, Shinji, Eisaku, Ryutaro, & Fujie (Matsuoka), 1931

Satō was the second son of Eisaku Satō and his wife Hiroko Satō (佐藤 寛子; 5 January 1907 – 16 April 1987). His older brother was Ryūtarō.

Satō followed his father into politics. He was first elected to the Japanese House of Councillors in 1974, two years after his father left office as prime minister. He was elected to the House of Representatives in 1979. Satō served as minister of transport under Prime Minister Noboru Takeshita. In 1996 he became the minister of international trade and industry, a very powerful position. This time he served under Prime Minister Ryūtarō Hashimoto.

His son-in-law, Masashi Adachi worked for him from 2003 to 2004. Masashi Adachi currently serves in the House of Councillors, and formerly worked as an aide for his cousin-in-law, Eisaku's grandnephew, Shinzo Abe.

Satō announced in 2012 that he had a document signed between his father and U.S. president Richard Nixon that would allow American nuclear weapons to be brought to Okinawa in emergencies.

== See also ==
- Satō–Kishi–Abe family
