= Yōko Abe =

Japanese calligrapher and political matriarch (1928–2024)

- 安倍 洋子
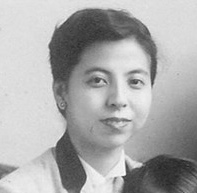
- Born: Yōko Kishi; 11 June 1928; Nakano, Tokyo, Japan
- Died: 4 February 2024 (aged 95); Tokyo, Japan
- Education: Shirayuri Gakuen Senior High School
- Spouse: Shintaro Abe (m. 1951; died 1991)
- Children: Hironobu; Shinzo; Nobuo
- Parents: Nobusuke Kishi (father); Yoshiko Kishi (mother)
- Relatives: Satō–Kishi–Abe family

Yōko Abe (安倍 洋子, Abe Yōko; née Kishi (岸); 11 June 1928 – 4 February 2024) was a Japanese calligrapher who was the mother of Prime Minister Shinzo Abe, the daughter of Prime Minister Nobusuke Kishi, the wife of Minister of Foreign Affairs Shintaro Abe, and a member of the Japanese Satō–Kishi–Abe family.

== Biography ==
Born on 11 June 1928, Yōko Abe was the eldest daughter of Nobusuke Kishi, the widow of Shintaro Abe, and the mother of Hironobu, Shinzo Abe, and Nobuo Kishi.

Known for her calligraphy, she was considered to be the "Godmother" of the Kishi-Abe family (a Japanese political family for three generations), and had long been the leader of the wives of members of Seiwa Seisaku Kenkyūkai. She was called the "Godmother of the World of Politics" because she had many followers in politics.

Yōko Abe died on 4 February 2024, at the age of 95.

== Works ==
- 『わたしの安倍晋太郎：岸信介の娘として』（ネスコ、1992年）

== Honors ==
- Order of Saints Maurice and Lazarus
