= Shintaro Abe =

Japanese politician (1926–1991)

- 安倍 晋太郎
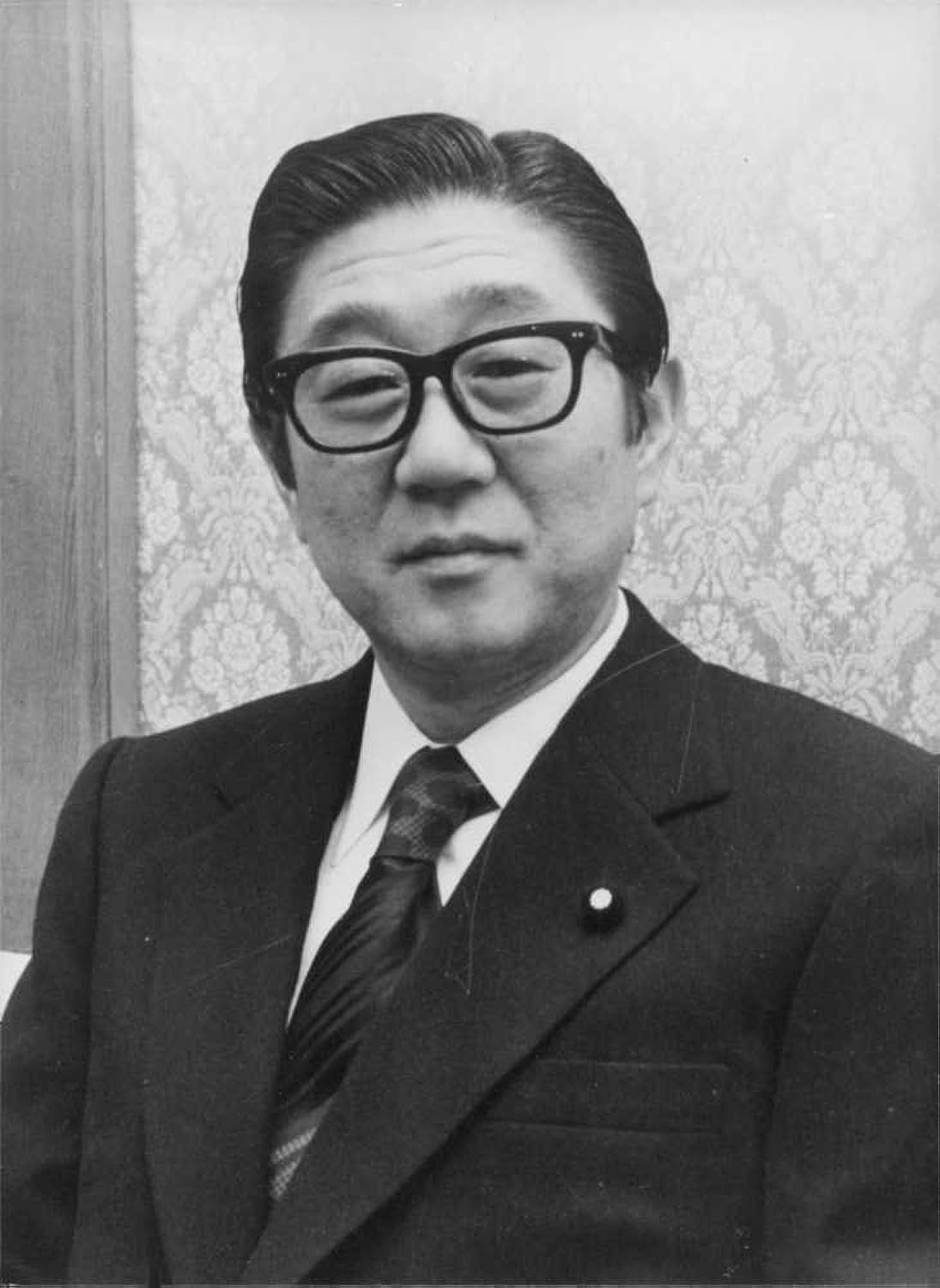
- Abe in 1982

Minister of Foreign Affairs
- In office 27 November 1982 – 22 July 1986
- Prime Minister: Yasuhiro Nakasone
- Preceded by: Yoshio Sakurauchi
- Succeeded by: Tadashi Kuranari

Minister of International Trade and Industry
- In office 30 November 1981 – 27 November 1982
- Prime Minister: Zenkō Suzuki
- Preceded by: Rokusuke Tanaka
- Succeeded by: Sadanori Yamanaka

Chief Cabinet Secretary
- In office 28 November 1977 – 7 December 1978
- Prime Minister: Takeo Fukuda
- Preceded by: Sunao Sonoda
- Succeeded by: Rokusuke Tanaka

Minister of Agriculture and Forestry
- In office 9 December 1974 – 15 September 1976
- Prime Minister: Takeo Miki
- Preceded by: Tadao Kuraishi
- Succeeded by: Buichi Ōishi

Member of the House of Representatives
- In office 29 January 1967 – 15 May 1991
- Preceded by: Isamu Imazumi
- Succeeded by: Shinzo Abe
- Constituency: Yamaguchi 1st
- In office 23 May 1958 – 23 October 1963
- Preceded by: Kanemitsu Hososako
- Succeeded by: Isamu Imazumi
- Constituency: Yamaguchi 1st

Personal details
- Born: 29 April 1924 Shinjuku, Tokyo, Japan
- Died: 15 May 1991 (aged 67) Bunkyō, Tokyo, Japan
- Party: Liberal Democratic
- Spouse: Yoko Kishi (m. 1951)
- Children: Hironobu; Shinzō; Nobuo
- Parents: Kan Abe (father); Shizuko Abe (mother)
- Relatives: Satō–Kishi–Abe family
- Education: University of Tokyo

Shintaro Abe (安倍 晋太郎, Abe Shintarō; 29 April 1924 – 15 May 1991) was a Japanese politician who served as Minister of Foreign Affairs from 1982 to 1986. He was a leading member of the ruling Liberal Democratic Party (LDP). He was the father of Prime Minister Shinzo Abe and part of the Satō–Kishi–Abe family.

== Early life and education ==
Shintaro Abe was born on 29 April 1924, in Tokyo, the only child of Kan Abe and Shizuko Hondo. His parents got divorced on July 24, 1924 when he was two months old. His mother married a banker named Kenzo Nishimura and he has two maternal half-brothers. His maternal half-brother Masao Nishimura was born on November 18, 1932 and died on August 1, 2006 at the age of 73 due to heart failure. He was raised by his father in prefecture of Yamaguchi after his parents got divorced. His maternal grandfather is Tsunejiro Hondo who is an army general. His mother died at the age of thirty one due to illness in 1936 when Shintaro Abe was twelve years old.

== Personal life ==
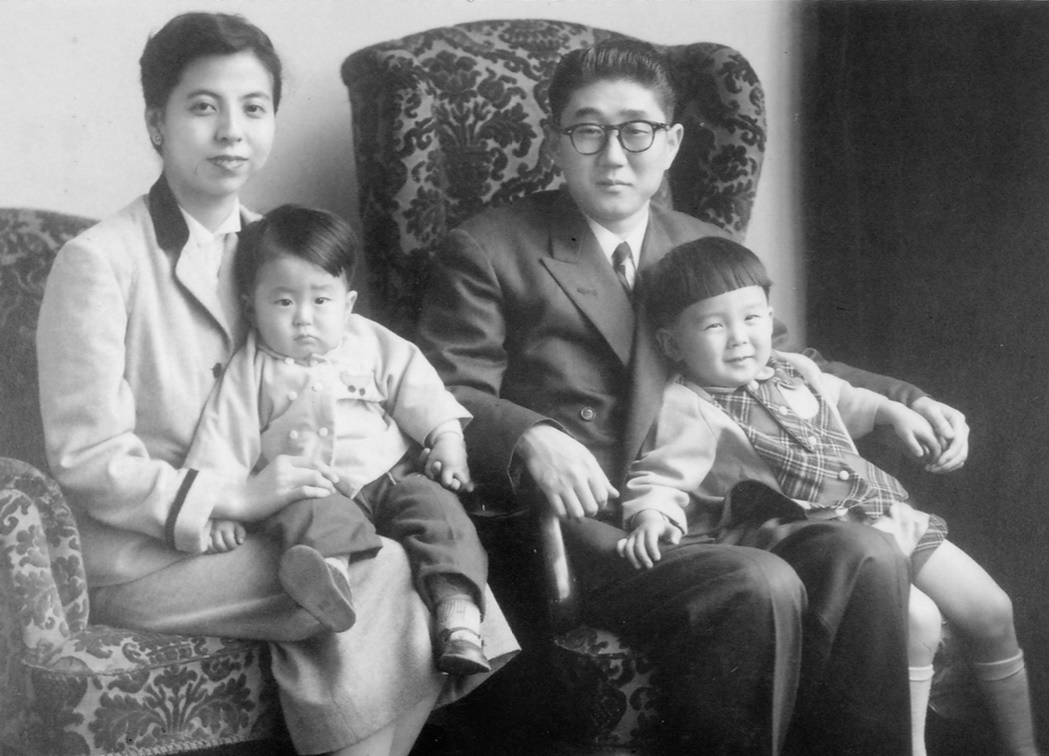
Shintaro Abe and his family in 1956.

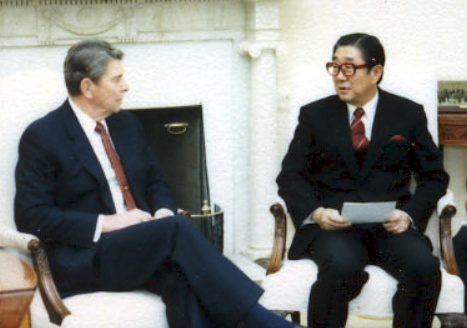
Abe meeting Ronald Reagan in 1987.

Abe married Yoko Kishi, daughter of Prime Minister Nobusuke Kishi, in 1951. His second son, Shinzo Abe, served as prime minister from 2006 to 2007 and from 2012 to 2020. His third son, Nobuo Kishi, was adopted by his brother-in-law shortly after birth, won a House of Representatives seat in 2012 and was appointed Minister of Defense in 2020. He was from Yamaguchi Prefecture.

== Career ==
After graduating from high school in 1944 during World War II, Abe entered a naval aviation school and volunteered to become a kamikaze pilot. The war ended before he could undergo the required training. In 1949 he graduated from the Faculty of Law at the University of Tokyo, Shintaro Abe began his career as a political reporter for Mainichi Shimbun.

Abe formally entered the political sphere in 1956, when he started working as a legislative aide of his father in-law, then-foreign minister Nobusuke Kishi. He became an aide to the Prime Minister when Kishi assumed the premiership the following year. In 1958, Abe contested and won the House of Representatives seat once held by his father.

He led a major LDP faction, the conservative Seiwa Seisaku Kenkyūkai, whose reins he took from former Prime Minister Takeo Fukuda in July 1986, and held a variety of ministerial and party posts, the former of which included Minister of Agriculture and Forestry and Minister of International Trade and Industry. Abe was named as Minister of International Trade and Industry in the cabinet of the then prime minister Zenkō Suzuki on 30 November 1981. During this period, he was seen as a young leader groomed for the future prime ministry. In November 1982, he was appointed Minister for Foreign Affairs in the cabinet of the then-prime minister Yasuhiro Nakasone, replacing Yoshio Sakurauchi. His term lasted until 1986.

Abe was a top contender to succeed Nakasone as prime minister in 1987, until he stepped aside for Noboru Takeshita, head of a powerful rival faction. Then, he was given the post of secretary general of the party in 1987. In 1988, his chances of becoming prime minister some time in the near future were again thwarted when his name became associated with the Recruit-Cosmos insider-trading stock scandal, which brought down Takeshita and forced Abe to resign as the party's secretary general in December 1988.

== Death ==
Shintaro Abe was hospitalized on January 19, 1991. He died at Tokyo's Juntendo University Hospital on 15 May 1991, aged 67. The cause of death was heart failure.

== Honours ==
From the corresponding article in the Japanese Wikipedia

- Grand Cordon of the Order of the Rising Sun with Order of the Paulownia Flowers

Political offices
Preceded by Tadao Kuraishi	Minister of Agriculture and Forestry; 1974–1976	Succeeded by Buichi Ōishi
Preceded by Sunao Sonoda	Chief Cabinet Secretary; 1977–1978	Succeeded by Rokusuke Tanaka
Preceded by Rokusuke Tanaka	Minister of International Trade and Industry; 1981–1982	Succeeded by Sadanori Yamanaka
Preceded by Yoshio Sakurauchi	Minister for Foreign Affairs of Japan; 1982–1986	Succeeded by Tadashi Kuranari
House of Representatives (Japan)
Preceded by Soichi Kamoda	Chair, Financial Affairs Committee of the House of Representatives of Japan; 1973–1974	Succeeded by Senichiro Uemura
Party political offices
Preceded by Toshiki Kaifu	Chairman of the Diet Affairs Committee, Liberal Democratic Party; 1976–1977	Succeeded by Asao Mihara
Preceded by Toshio Komoto	Chairman of the Policy Research Committee, Liberal Democratic Party; 1979–1981	Succeeded by Rokusuke Tanaka
Preceded by Kiichi Miyazawa	Chairman of General Affairs Committee, Liberal Democratic Party; 1986–1987	Succeeded by Masayoshi Ito
Preceded by Noboru Takeshita	Secretary-General of the Liberal Democratic Party; 1987–1989	Succeeded by Ryutaro Hashimoto
Preceded by Takeo Fukuda	Head of Seiwa Seisaku Kenkyūkai; 1986–1991	Succeeded by Hiroshi Mitsuzuka
