= Yamaguchi 2nd district (1928–1942) =

Legislative district of Japan

Yamaguchi's 2nd district was a constituency of the House of Representatives in the Imperial Diet of Japan (national legislature). Between 1928 and 1942 it elected five representatives by single non-transferable vote (SNTV). It consisted of Yamaguchi Prefecture's Ōshima, Kuga, Kumage, Tsuno, Saba, and Yoshiki districts.

The district was most notably represented by two wartime ministers: Yōsuke Matsuoka, foreign and colonial minister in the 2nd Konoe cabinet, and Nobusuke Kishi, trade and industry minister in the Tōjō cabinet.

After the 1946 redistricting, all of Yamaguchi formed one limited voting at-large district. In 1947, the area together with six new cities in Yamaguchi (Hōfu, Kudamatsu, Iwakuni, Hikari, Yamaguchi, Tokuyama) formed the new SNTV 2nd district of Yamaguchi. Kishi was reelected there after his release from prison for the Yoshida Liberal Party in 1953, Hatoyama's Japan Democratic Party in 1955 and later the LDP's conservative anti-mainstream where he chaired his own faction.

== Elected Representatives ==
| election year | highest vote (top tōsen) | 2nd | 3rd | 4th | 5th |
|---|---|---|---|---|---|
| 1928 | Yoichi Sawamoto (Rikken Minseitō) | Ihei Kuzuhara (Rikken Seiyūkai) | Yūji Kodama (Rikken Seiyūkai) | Takashi (?) Yoshimoto (Rikken Seiyūkai) | Shigeo Nishimura (Rikken Seiyūkai) |
| 1930 | Yōsuke Matsuoka (Rikken Seiyūkai) | Shigeo Nishimura (Rikken Seiyūkai) | Yoichi Sawamoto (Rikken Minseitō) | Yūji Kodama (Rikken Seiyūkai) | Kenji Michimoto (?) (Rikken Minseitō) |
| 1932 | Yōsuke Matsuoka (Rikken Seiyūkai) | Yoshimichi Kuboi (?) (Rikken Seiyūkai) | Shigeo Nishimura (Rikken Seiyūkai) | Yoichi Sawamoto (Rikken Minseitō) | Yūji Kodama (Rikken Seiyūkai) |
| 1936 | Shigeo Nishimura (Rikken Seiyūkai) | Yoshimichi Kuboi (Shōwakai) | Gorō Kunimitsu (?) (Rikken Seiyūkai) | Yūji Kodama (Rikken Seiyūkai) | Jisuke Nakano (Rikken Seiyūkai) |
| 1937 | Shigeo Nishimura (Rikken Seiyūkai) | Yoshimichi Kuboi (Shōwakai) | Gorō Kunimitsu (?) (Rikken Seiyūkai) | Yasuo Fukuda (Rikken Minseitō) | Jisuke Nakano (Rikken Seiyūkai) |
| 1942 | Nobusuke Kishi (Yokusan Seijitaisei Kyōgikai) | Shigeo Nishimura (Yokusan Seijitaisei Kyōgikai) | Yoshimichi Kuboi (Yokusan Seijitaisei Kyōgikai) | Sōjirō Yagi (Yokusan Seijitaisei Kyōgikai) | Mikisaburō Itō (Yokusan Seijitaisei Kyōgikai) |
