= Ichirō Satō =

Japanese Rear Admiral (1889–1958)

- 佐藤 市郎
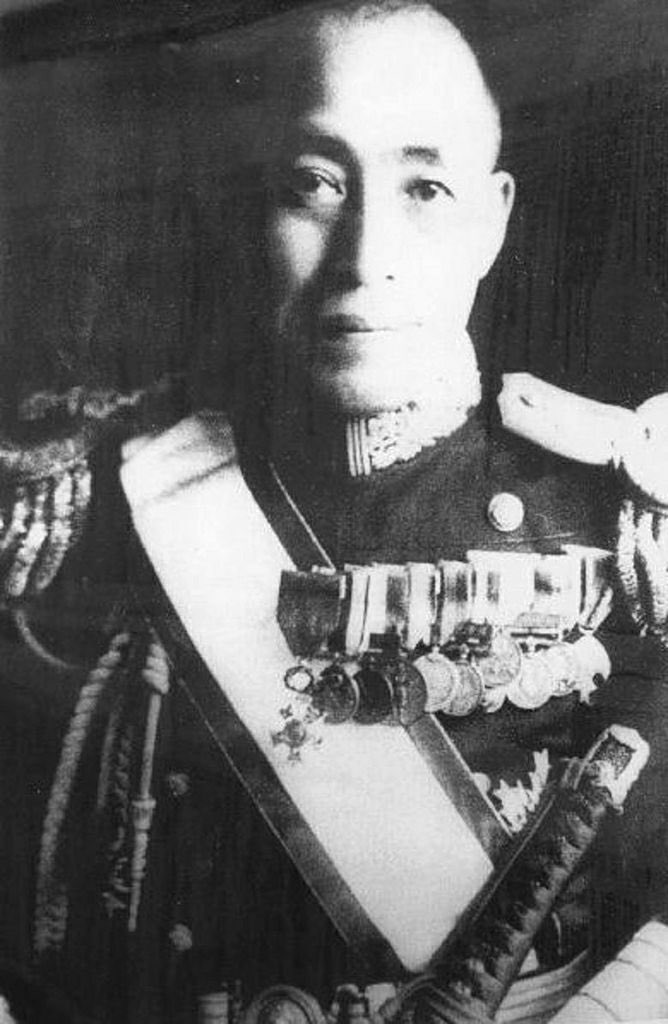
- Born: August 28, 1889; Tabuse, Yamaguchi, Japan
- Died: April 12, 1958 (aged 68)
- Military career
- Allegiance: Empire of Japan
- Branch: Imperial Japanese Navy
- Service years: 1908–1940
- Rank: Vice Admiral
- Commands: Ryojun Guard District

Ichirō Satō (佐藤 市郎, Satō Ichirō; August 28, 1889 – April 12, 1958) was a vice admiral in the Imperial Japanese Navy, educator, historian, and naval diplomat. As a member of the Satō–Kishi–Abe family, he was the older brother of two Japanese prime ministers, Nobusuke Kishi and Eisaku Satō.

== Early life and education ==
Satō was born in Tabuse, Yamaguchi Prefecture, the son of a sake brewer from a once illustrious samurai family that had recently fallen on hard times. His younger brothers, Nobusuke Kishi and Eisaku Satō, would both go on to become prime ministers of Japan. Satō graduated from the Naval Academy in 1908.

== Military career ==
From 1920, Satō was stationed in France, and in 1923, he was appointed as a staff officer in the General Staff of the Imperial Japanese Navy. In 1927, he represented the Imperial Japanese Navy at the Geneva Conference on Naval Disarmament, where he argued that the Japanese Navy was nothing more than a means of self-defense and that Japan could never afford to engage in a war with a great naval power. That same year, he became Chief of Staff of the Combined Fleet, and the following year, he was named Captain of the cruiser Nagara. In 1929, Satō represented the Imperial Navy on the Permanent Military Advisory Committee to the League of Nations, and in 1930, he served as an IJN representative at the London Conference on Naval Disarmament. In 1932, he was appointed First Chief of the Education Bureau, Ministry of the Navy, and later served as vice principal of the Naval War College. In 1938, he was promoted to Vice Admiral and assigned to command the Japanese naval station at Port Arthur, but was transferred to the reserves in 1940 due to ill health.

== Later life ==
Upon his retirement, he was awarded the Order of the Rising Sun, Gold Rays with Neck Ribbon. Thereafter, he embarked on a second career as a naval historian, writing A Fifty-Year History of the Japanese Navy (1943). Satō died of uremia complicated by pneumonia on April 12, 1958.
