= Masuo Matsuoka =

Japanese politician (1934–2024)

- 松岡 満寿男

Member of the House of Councillors
- In office 12 July 1998 – 11 July 2004
- Preceded by: Hideo Futatsugi
- Succeeded by: Nobuo Kishi
- Constituency: Yamaguchi at-large
- In office 26 June 1983 – 23 July 1989
- Preceded by: Tarō Ozawa
- Succeeded by: Ken'ichi Yamada
- Constituency: Yamaguchi at-large

Member of the House of Representatives
- In office 19 July 1993 – 20 October 1996
- Preceded by: Katsusuke Ozawa
- Succeeded by: Constituency abolished
- Constituency: Yamaguchi 2nd

Mayor of Hikari
- In office July 1971 – October 1972
- Preceded by: Mitsuo Matsuoka
- Succeeded by: Hideo Mizuki

Personal details
- Born: 4 October 1934 Hsinking, Manchukuo
- Died: 9 June 2024 (aged 89) Hikari, Yamaguchi, Japan
- Party: Democratic
- Other political affiliations: LDP (1971–1993); JNP (1993–1994); NFP (1994–1998)
- Parent: Mitsuo Matsuoka (father)
- Education: Waseda University
- Occupation: Steelworker

Masuo Matsuoka (Japanese: 松岡満寿男 Matsuoka Masua; 4 October 1934 – 9 June 2024) was a Japanese politician. A member of multiple political parties, he served in the House of Councillors from 1983 to 1989 and again from 1998 to 2004. He also served in the House of Representatives from 1993 to 1996.

Matsuoka died in Hikari, Yamaguchi Prefecture on 9 June 2024, at the age of 89.
