= Kan Abe =

Japanese politician (1894–1946)

- 安倍 寛
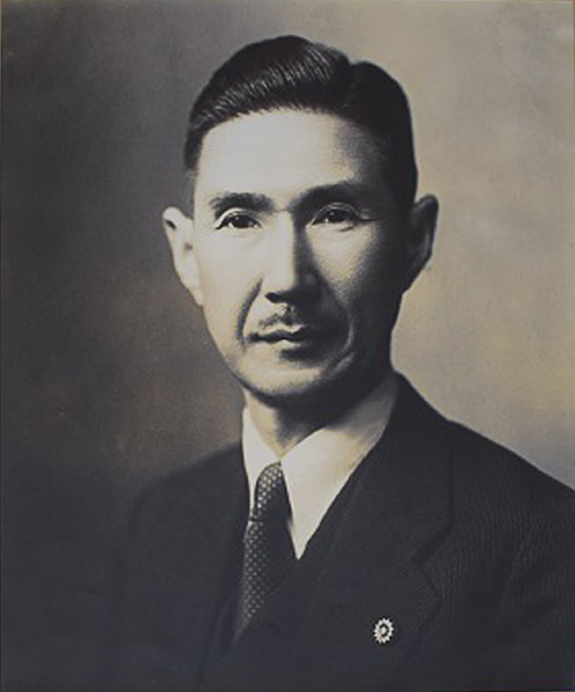

Member of the House of Representatives
- In office 30 April 1937 – 18 December 1945
- Preceded by: Muraoka Goichi
- Succeeded by: Constituency abolished
- Constituency: Yamaguchi 1st

Personal details
- Born: 29 April 1894 Heki, Yamaguchi, Japan
- Died: 30 January 1946 (aged 51) Tokyo, Japan
- Party: Independent
- Other political affiliations: Rikken Seiyūkai (1928); Progressive (1945–1946)
- Spouse: Shizuko Hondō
- Children: Shintarō Abe
- Parent(s): Ayasuke Abe; Tame Abe
- Relatives: Satō–Kishi–Abe family
- Education: Tokyo Imperial University

Kan Abe (安倍 寛, Abe Kan; 29 April 1894 – 30 January 1946) was a Japanese politician who served in the House of Representatives from 1937 to 1946. A member of the Satō–Kishi–Abe family, he was the father of former Foreign Minister Shintaro Abe and the grandfather of former Prime Minister Shinzō Abe.

== Early life and education ==
Abe was born on 29 April 1894, in Heki (present-day Nagato), Yamaguchi Prefecture, the eldest son of Abe Hyōsuke and his wife Tame. The Abe family was a prominent family of landowners and sake and soy sauce brewers in Heki who had served as nanushi (village heads) in the Edo period. His father was from the Mukunoki family, a prominent family in Ōtsu, who was adopted into his wife's family upon marriage. Both his parents died by the time he was four, after which he was raised by his aunt Yoshi. Abe graduated from Tokyo Imperial University, the predecessor of the University of Tokyo.

== Political career ==
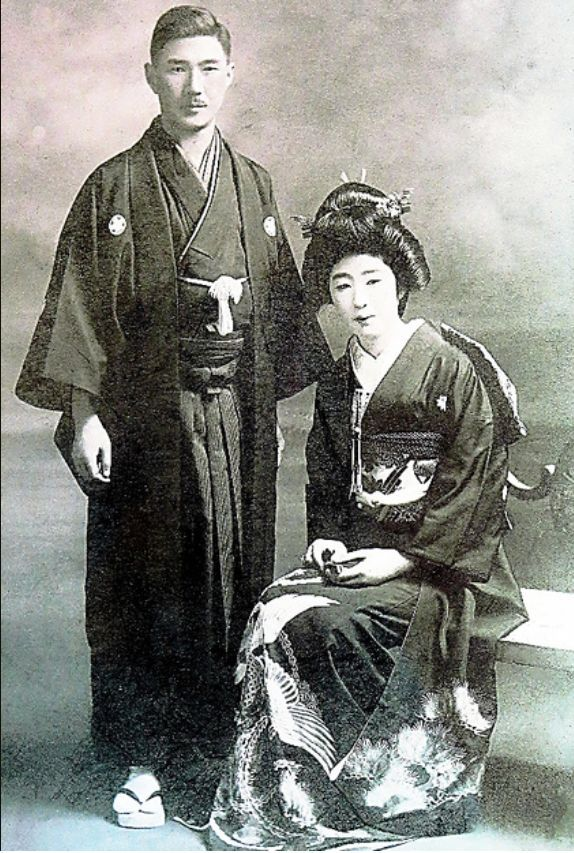
Kan Abe and his wife Shizuko

Abe stood as a Seiyūkai Party candidate in the February 1928 general election but lost; he was appointed village mayor of Heki in 1933 and later served in the Yamaguchi Prefectural Assembly. He was elected to the House of Representatives as an independent candidate in the February 1937 general election. He earned the nickname "New Shōin" or "Shōwa Shōin" in honor of the earlier leader from Yamaguchi, Yoshida Shōin.

In the 1942 general election, he ran on a platform opposing the militarist government under Hideki Tojo, which had by this time taken away most powers from the Diet. The Tojo cabinet had attempted to block antiwar candidates from running through a registration system, notwithstanding which Abe won a Diet seat, which he used for an attempt to oust Tojo and end World War II. Abe was assisted in this effort by Takeo Miki, who became prime minister after the war.

Abe died of a heart attack in January 1946 while preparing to run in the first post-war general election.
