= Masashi Adachi =

Japanese politician (born 1959)

- 阿達 雅志
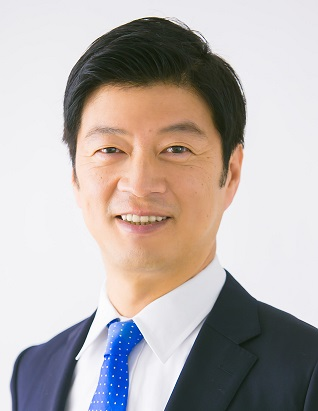
- Official portrait, 2020

Senator of Japan
- Incumbent
- Assumed office 4 December 2014
- Preceded by: Yukari Sato
- Constituency: National PR

Personal details
- Born: 27 September 1959 (age 67) Sakyō, Kyoto, Japan
- Party: Liberal Democratic
- Education: University of Tokyo

Masashi Adachi (阿達 雅志 Adachi Masashi, b. September 27, 1959) is a Japanese politician who serves as a member of the Senate and as a State Minister for Internal Affairs and Communications.

== Early life ==
Adachi was born in Sakyo-ku, Kyoto, and grew up in Fukui, Sakai, and Takatsuki. He graduated from the University of Tokyo and joined Sumitomo Corporation in 1983, where he worked on rail car exports to the United States. He obtained an MCJ and LLM from the New York University School of Law in 1993, and became qualified as a lawyer in New York. He thereafter worked in the legal department of Sumitomo, and in the executive office of its Chinese subsidiary. He left Sumitomo in 2000, and thereafter worked for his father-in-law, Shinji Satō (a Diet member and son of Prime Minister Eisaku Satō), from 2003 to 2004. He then worked for the law firm of Paul Weiss in Tokyo from 2004 to 2014.

== Political career ==
He ran as a Liberal Democratic Party candidate for the House of Councillors in the 2007 election but lost He joined the law school faculty of Nihon University as an adjunct professor in 2008. He again ran as an LDP candidate in the 2010 House of Councillors election and lost.

He finally entered the House of Councillors as a runner-up after Yukari Sato resigned in December 2014 to run in the 2014 Japanese general election, and won re-election in the 2016 House of Councillors election.

He was appointed as a vice-minister for the Cabinet Office and Ministry of Land, Infrastructure, Transport and Tourism in 2018 under Prime Minister Shinzo Abe.
