= Japanese nationalism =

Flag of Japan

Japanese nationalism (Note: There are various notation for "Nationalism" in Japan: ナショナリズム (Hepburn: nashonalizumu, lit: Katakana notation for the English word "nationalism"); 国粋主義 (Hepburn: kokusui shugi, lit: "national essentialism"); 国家主義 (Hepburn: kokka shugi, lit: "state-based nationalism" or "Shōwa statism"); 民族主義 (Hepburn: minzoku shugi, lit: "cultural nationalism" or "ethnic nationalism"); 国民主義 (Hepburn: kokumin shugi, lit: "state-based nationalism" or "civic nationalism"); 日本主義 (Hepburn: nihon shugi, lit: "Japan-ism" or "Japanese nationalism")) is a form of nationalism that asserts the belief that the Japanese are a monolithic nation with a single immutable culture. Over the last two centuries, it has encompassed a broad range of ideas and sentiments. It is useful to distinguish Japanese cultural nationalism from political or state nationalism, since many forms of cultural nationalism, such as those which are associated with folkloric studies, have been hostile to state-fostered nationalism.

In Meiji Japan, nationalist ideology consisted of a blend of native and imported political philosophies, initially developed by the Meiji government to promote national unity and patriotism, first in defense against colonization by Western powers, and later in a struggle to attain equality with the Great Powers.

It evolved throughout the Taishō and Shōwa periods, and it was increasingly used to justify extreme ideologies, such as fascism, militarism, racism, totalitarianism, and overseas expansionism. It has also provided a political as well as an ideological foundation for the actions and the atrocities of the Japanese military in the years leading up to and throughout World War II.

Japanese nationalism has been used as a justification for the censoring of history textbooks which results in the espousal of revisionist perspectives, which consists of the denial of Japanese imperialist atrocities, including 'comfort women' and the Nanjing Massacre.

== Origins during the Meiji era (1868–1912) ==
During the final days of the Tokugawa shogunate, the perceived threat of foreign encroachment, especially after the arrival of Commodore Matthew C. Perry and the signing of the Kanagawa Accord, led to increased prominence to the development of nationalist ideologies. Some prominent daimyō promoted the concept of fukko (a return to the past), while others promoted ōsei (the Emperor's supreme authority). The terms were not mutually exclusive, merging into the sonnō jōi (revere the emperor, expel the barbarians) concept, which in turn was a major driving force in starting the Meiji Restoration.

The Meiji Constitution of 1889 defined allegiance to the State as the citizen's highest duty. The constitution itself contained a mix of political Western practices and traditional Japanese political ideas.

=== Basis of economic growth ===
The extreme disparity in economic and military power between Japan and the Western colonial powers was a great cause for concern for the early Meiji leadership. The motto Fukoku kyōhei (enrich the country and strengthen the military) symbolized Meiji period nationalistic policies to provide government support to strengthen strategic industries. Only with a strong economic base could Japan afford to build a strong, modern military along Western lines, and only with a strong economy and military could Japan force a revision of the unequal treaties, such as the Kanagawa Accords. Government policies also laid the basis of later industrialist empires known as the zaibatsu.

=== Bushidō ===
As a residue of its widespread use in propaganda during the 19th century, military nationalism in Japan was often known as bushidō (武士道 "the way of the warrior"). The word, denoting a coherent code of beliefs and doctrines about the proper path of the samurai, or what is generically called 'warrior thought' (武家思想, buke shisō), is rarely encountered in Japanese texts which were written before the Meiji era, when the 11 volumes of the Hagakure of Yamamoto Tsunetomo, compiled in the years from 1710 to 1716 where the character combination is employed, was finally published.

Constituted over a long time by house manuals on war and warriors, it gained some official backing with the establishment of the Bakufu, which sought an ideological orthodoxy in the Neo-Confucianism of Zhu Xi tailored for military echelons that formed the basis of the new shogunal government. An important early role was played by Yamaga Sokō in theorizing a Japanese military ethos. After the abolition of the feudal system, the new military institutions of Japan were shaped along European lines, with Western instructors, and the codes themselves modeled on standard models adapted from abroad. The impeccable behavior, in terms of international criteria, displayed by the Japanese military in the Russo-Japanese War was proof that Japan finally had a modern army whose techniques, drilling, and etiquette of the war differed little from that of what prevailed among the Western imperial powers.

The Imperial Rescript for Seamen and Soldiers (1890), presented Japan as a "sacred nation protected by the gods". An undercurrent of traditional warrior values never wholly disappeared, and as Japan slid towards a cycle of repeated crises from the mid-Taishō to early Shōwa eras, the old samurai ideals began to assume importance among more politicized officers in the Imperial Japanese Army. Sadao Araki played an important role in adopting a doctrine of seishin kyōiku (spiritual training) as an ideological backbone for army personnel. As Minister of Education, he supported the integration of the samurai code into the national education system.

=== Role of Shinto ===
In developing the modern concepts of State Shintoism (国家神道, kokka shintō) and emperor worship, various Japanese philosophers tried to revive or purify national beliefs (kokugaku) by removing imported foreign ideas, borrowed primarily from Chinese philosophy. This "Restoration Shintōist Movement" began with Motoori Norinaga in the 18th century. Motoori Norinaga, and later Hirata Atsutane, based their research on the Kojiki and other classic Shintō texts which teach the superiority of the Sun Goddess Amaterasu. This formed the basis for State Shinto, as the Japanese emperor claimed direct descent from Amaterasu. The emperor himself was therefore sacred, and all proclamations of the emperor had thus a religious significance.

After the Meiji Restoration, the new imperial government needed to rapidly modernize the polity and economy of Japan, and the Meiji oligarchy felt that those goals could only be accomplished through a strong sense of national unity and cultural identity, with State Shinto as an essential counterweight to the imported Buddhism of the past, the Christianity and other Western philosophies of the present.

In 1890, the Imperial Rescript on Education was issued, and students were required to ritually recite its oath to "offer yourselves courageously to the State" as well as protect the Imperial family. The practice of emperor worship was further spread by distributing imperial portraits for esoteric veneration. All of these practices used to fortify national solidarity through patriotic centralized observance at shrines are said to have given pre-war Japanese nationalism a tint of mysticism and cultural introversion.

The hakko ichiu (八紘一宇) philosophy became popular during the Second Sino-Japanese War. This came to be regarded by militarists as a doctrine that the emperor was the center of the phenomenal world, lending religious impetus to ideas of Japanese territorial expansion.

=== Education ===
The principal educational emphasis from the Meiji period was on the great importance of traditional national political values, religion, and morality. The Imperial Rescript on Education of 1890 promoted a return to traditional Confucian values in the hierarchal nature of human relations, with the State superior to the Individual, and the Emperor superior to the State. The Japanese state modernized organizationally but preserved its national idiosyncrasies. The attitude reinforced from 1905 was that Japan was to be a powerful nation, equal at least to the Western powers. During the Shōwa period, the educational system was used for supporting the militarized state and preparing future soldiers.

The government published official textbooks for all levels of students and reinforced that with cultural activities, seminars, etc. Emphasis on the texts such as the Kokutai-no-hongi in schools was intended to emphasize the "uniqueness of Japan" from ancient centuries. These cultural courses were supplemented with military and survival courses against foreign invasion.

Apart from indoctrination in nationalism and religion, children and school students received military drills (survival, first aid). These were taken further by the Imperial Youth Federation; college students were trained, and some recruited, for home defense and regular military units. Young women received first aid training. All of these actions were said to be taken to ensure Japan's safety and protect against larger and more dangerous countries.

== Nationalist politics ==
=== Origin of nationalist structures and parties ===
In 1882, the Japanese Government organized the Teiseito (Imperial Gubernative Party), one of the first nationalist parties in the country. Starting from the Russo-Japanese War, Japan adopted the moniker "Empire of Japan" ("Dai Nippon Teikoku"), acquiring a colonial empire, with the acquisition of Hokkaido (1869), Ryukyu (1879), Formosa (1895), the Liaodong Peninsula and Karafuto (1905), Joseon (Korea) (1905–10) and the South Seas Mandate islands (1918–19).

The wars against China and Russia were modern wars and as a result, they demanded a nationalist expression of patriotic sentiment. From this period, the Yasukuni Shrine (founded in 1869) was converted into a focus of nationalist sentiment and it received state patronage until the end of World War II. Yasukuni was dedicated to those Japanese and those non-Japanese who had lost their lives while they were serving Japan, and it honors all Japanese and all non-Japanese who died in domestic and overseas conflicts from 1869 to 1945 (but it does not honor any Japanese military personnel nor does it honor any non-Japanese military personnel who died in conflicts which occurred since 1945), it also honors civilians (women and students) and civil administration in colonies and occupied territories.

Between 1926 and 1928, the central government organized the "Peace Preservation Department" (an anti-subversive police section) and prosecuted all local Soviet-sponsored communists who proposed a socialist form of government. The Japanese Army organized the Kempeitai (military police service). Dissent was controlled by the usage of political and press repression, with the Peace Preservation Law permitting police to restrict freedom of expression and freedom to assemble.

From 1925 to 1935, the Nippon Shimbun (日本新聞) promoted nationalist ideology and sought to influence the Japanese political landscape. In spite of a relatively small overall circulation, it had wide readership among right-wing politicians and advocated the concept of the divine right of the emperor by vigorously attacking Tatsukichi Minobe's “emperor organ theory”.

=== Realities of political power ===
Kyokujitsu-ki (the sun-with rays-flag) was the ensign of the Imperial Japanese Navy; it is now employed by the Japan Maritime Self-Defense Force ships.

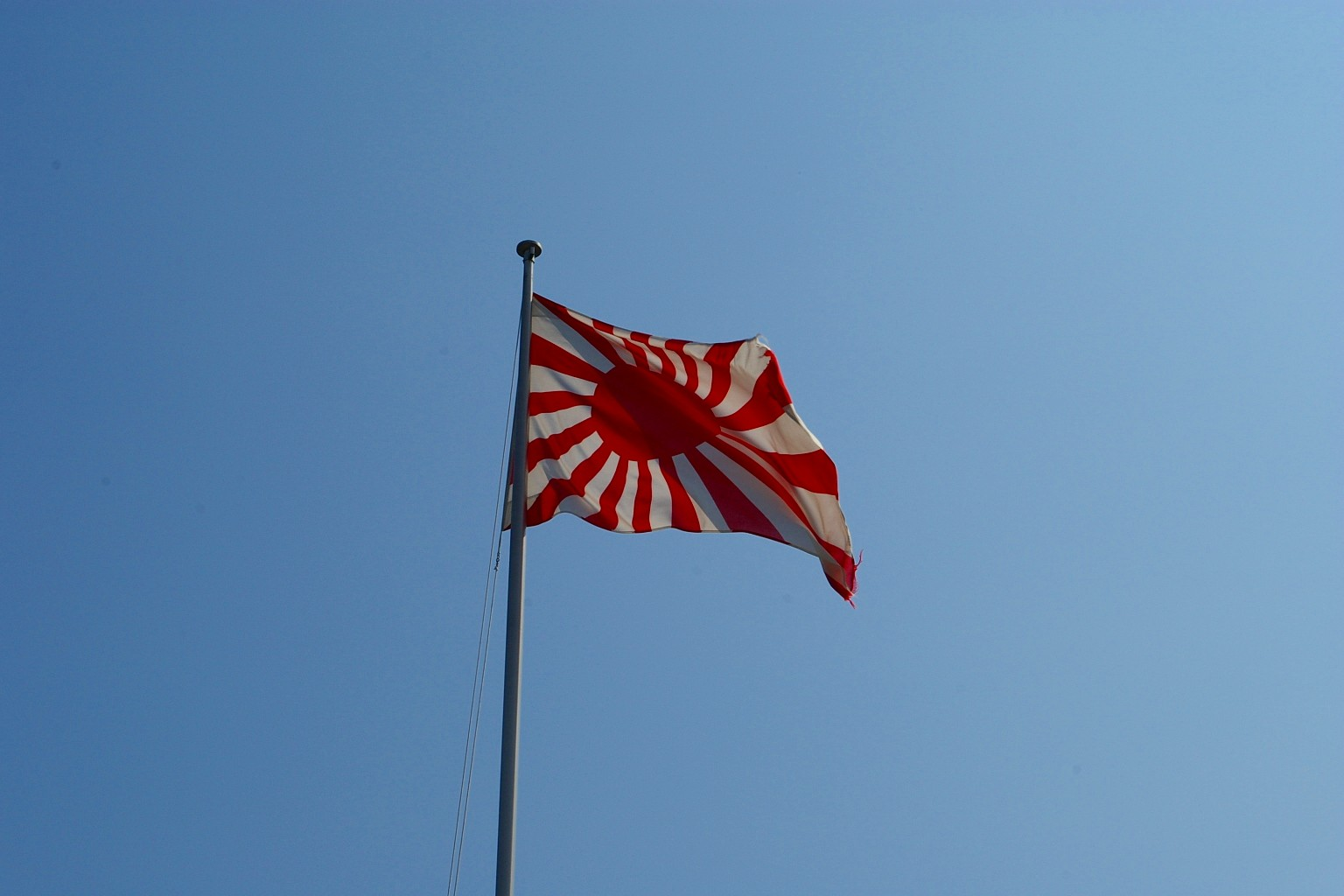
Naval ensign of the battleship Mikasa

Since the Meiji restoration, the central figure of the state was the Emperor. According to the constitution, the emperor was Head of State (article 4) and Supreme Commander of the Army and the Navy (article 11). Emperor Hirohito was also, from 1937, the commander of the Imperial General Headquarters. Japanese citizens were rallied to the "Defensive State" or "Consensus State", in which all efforts of the nation supported collective objectives, by guidance from national myths, history, and dogma — thus obtaining a "national consensus". Democratic institutions were installed in 1890 with the promulgation of a constitution and continued to acquire legitimacy until the 1920s when they fell into disrepute.

Concerns that irresponsible political parties could have too great an influence over vital military affairs introduced a rule that the Army alone should nominate the Army Minister in civilian government. This permitted the army to have a de facto veto over civilian governments by having the power to refuse to nominate a candidate. This policy was introduced in law in 1900 but abolished in 1913. It was reintroduced in 1936, cementing military influence over the government after that time.

The political system of Japan became subverted by the military throughout the 1930s from repeated attempted coups, and independent militarist interventions. The invasion of Manchuria after elements in the army manufactured an incident to justify a takeover was accomplished without instruction from the Tokyo government. This showed the impotence of the civilian government to have any influence over the impulses of the army. Governments became increasingly passive, allowing agency and direction of the state to fall to disparate competing elements of the army. The role of the emperor remained highly prestigious, with various factions competing to advocate their interpretation of what the emperor "truly" wanted.

After the war, scrutiny of the emperor's role in the war and militarism intensified. For many historians such as Akira Fujiwara, Akira Yamada, Peter Wetzler, Herbert Bix and John Dower, the work done by Douglas MacArthur and SCAP during the first months of the occupation of Japan to exonerate Hirohito and all the imperial family from criminal prosecutions in the Tokyo tribunal was the predominant factor in the campaign to diminish in retrospect the role played by the emperor during the war. They argue that the post-war view focused on the imperial conferences and missed the numerous "behind the chrysanthemum curtain" meetings where the real decisions were made between Hirohito, his chiefs of staff, and the cabinet. For Fujiwara, "the thesis that the Emperor, as an organ of responsibility, could not reverse cabinet decision, is a myth fabricated after the war."

=== Political ideas ===
During the 1920s, right-wing nationalist beliefs became an increasingly dominant force. State support for Shinto encouraged a belief in the mythological history of Japan and thus, it led to mysticism and cultural chauvinism. Some secret societies espoused ultranationalism and Japan-centered radical ideas. They included: Genyōsha (Black Ocean Society, 1881), Kokuryu-kai (Amur River Society, or Black Dragon Society, 1901), movements dedicated to overseas Japanese expansion to the north; Nihon Kokusai Kai (Japanese Patriotic Society, 1919), founded by Tokoname Takejiro; Sekka Boshidan (Anti-Red League) founded at the same time as the Japanese Communist Party; and the Kokuhonsha (State Basis Society) founded in 1924 by Baron Hiranuma Kiichirō, for the preservation of the unique national character of Japan and its special mission in Asia.

Some of the nationalist ideas can be attributed to the ideologue Ikki Kita (1885–1937), an Amur River Society member. In his 1919 book An Outline Plan for the Reorganization of Japan, Kita proposed a military coup d'état to promote the supposed true aims of the Meiji Restoration. This book was banned, but certain military circles read in it in the early 1930s. Kita's plan was phrased in terms of freeing the Emperor from weak or treasonous counselors. After suspending the constitution, and dissolving the Diet, the Emperor and his military defenders should work for a "collectivist direct voluntarism" to unify people and leaders. Harmony with the working classes would be sought by the abolition of the aristocracy and austerity for the Imperial House. Overseas, Japan would free Asia of Western influence. The Amur River Society was later instrumental in the Manchurian incident.

=== Political nationalist movements ===
The Japanese Navy was in general terms more traditionalist, in defending ancient values and the sacred nature of the Emperor; the Japanese Army was more forward-looking, in the sense of valuing primarily strong leadership, as is evidenced by the use of the coup and direct action. The Navy typically preferred political methods. The Army, ultimately, was the vehicle for the hyper-nationalists, anti-communists, anticapitalists, antiparliamentarians, and Nationalist-Militarist ideals.

The military was considered politically "clean" in terms of political corruption, additionally assuming responsibility for 'restoring' the security of the nation. The armed forces took up criticism of the traditional democratic parties and regular government for many reasons (low funds for the armed forces, compromised national security, weakness of the leaders). They were also, by their composition, closely aware of the effects of economic depression on the middle and lower classes, and the communist threat.

Both branches gained power as they administered the exterior provinces and military preparations.

=== Nationalist right in the 1920s ===
Other nationalist rightist groups in the 1920s were the Jinmu Kai (Emperor Jimmu Society), Tenketo Kai (Heaven Spade Party), Ketsumeidan (Blood Fraternity) and Sakura Kai (Cherry Blossom Society). This last was founded by Dr. Shūmei Ōkawa, professor of the Colonization Academy, and radical defender of expansionism and military armed revolution at home. Amongst members were Army officers implicated in the Manchuria Affair, such as Kingoro Hashimoto, and Ishikawa Kanishi. Okawa served as a conduit by which Kita Ikki's ideas reached young nationalist officers on the right.

Symbol of Taisei Yokusankai

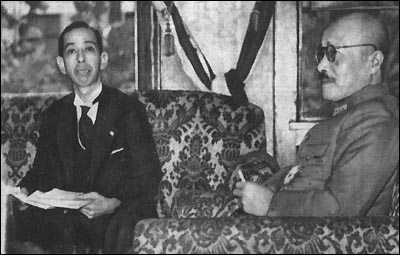
Hideki Tōjō (right) and Nobusuke Kishi, October 1943

Violent coups took place, and the Kwantung Army made, in effect unilaterally, the decision to invade Manchuria. This was then treated as a fait accompli by Government and Emperor.

=== Doctrines ===
The Amau Doctrine (the "Asian Monroe Doctrine") stated that Japan assumed the total responsibility for peace in Asia. Minister Kōki Hirota proclaimed "a special zone, anti-communist, pro-Japanese and pro-Manchukuo" and that Northern China was a "fundamental part" of Japanese national existence, in announcing a "holy war" against the Soviet Union and China as the "national mission".

During 1940 Prince Konoe proclaimed the Shintaisei (New National Structure), making Japan into an "advanced state of National Defense", and the creation of the Taisei Yokusankai (Imperial Authority Assistance Association), for organizing a centralized "consensus state". Associated are the government creation of the Tonarigumi (residents' committees). Other ideological creations of the time were the book "Shinmin no Michi" (臣民の道), the "Imperial Way" or "War Party" (Kodoha) Army party, the "Yamato spirit" (Yamato-damashii), and the idea of hakko ichiu (which directly translates to "8 corners under one roof", that means, "one house in which every people can live" or "everyone is family"), "Religion and Government Unity" (Saisei itchi), and Kokka Sodoin Ho (General Mobilization Right).

The official academic texts included Kokutai no Hongi and Shinmin no Michi. Both presented a view of Japan's history and the Japanese ideal to unite East and West.

=== Geostrategy ===
Greater East Asia Co-Prosperity Sphere at its greatest extent

The economic doctrines of the "Yen block" were in 1941 transformed to the "Great Asia Co-Prosperity Sphere" Plan, as a basis for the Japanese national finances, and conquest plans. There was a history of perhaps two decades behind these moves.

The Japanese theorists, such as Saneshige Komaki, concerned with Mainland Asia, knew the geostrategic theory of Halford Mackinder, expressed in the book Democratic Ideas and Reality. He discussed why the 'World Island' of Eurasia and Africa was dominant, and why the key to this was the 'Central Land' in Central Asia. This is protected from sea attack, by deserts and mountains, and is vulnerable only on its west side, and to advanced technology from Europe.

Mackinder declared that: "Who rules East Europe commands the Heartland; Who rules the heartland commands the World-Island; Who rules the World-Island commands the World". These central Asiatic lands included: all of the Soviet Union, except the Pacific coast, west of the Volga River; all Mongolia, Sinkiang, Tibet and Iran. This zone is vast and possesses natural resources and raw materials, does not possess major farming possibilities, and has a very little population. Mackinder thought in terms of land and sea power: the latter can outflank the former, and carry out distant logistical operations, but needs adequate bases.

These geopolitical ideas coincided with the theories of Lieutenant Colonel Kanji Ishiwara, sent in 1928 to Manchuria to spy. The Army was on the Strike North Group side. The Navy, on the other hand, was interested in the southerly direction of expansion. An extended debate ensued, resolved in the end by the stern experience of Japan's armed conflicts with the Soviet Union in 1938–39. This tipped the balance towards the 'South' plan and the Pearl Harbor attack that precipitated the Pacific War in 1941.

In 1942 after Japan's capture of Singapore, Saneshige Komaki stated the claims and plan for the Asia Co-prosperity sphere and the geostrategy going forward. Komaki laid it out plainly stating, How Java, the Philippines and Formosa will produce sugar. Chain and India will produce cotton and have all the machinery to spin it along with japan. Manchuria will grow beans. Australia and New Zealand will produce wool, supplemented by China, Mongolia and Manchoukuo. This lays out Japan's plans after their initial success in 1942.

=== Other ideological lines ===
The Showa Studies Society was another "think tank" for future leaders of a radical totalitarian Japan, led by Count Yoriyasu Arima. He was a supporter of radical political experiments. With Fumimaro Konoe and Fusanosuke Kuhara, they created a revolutionary radical-right policy.

These revolutionary groups later had the help of several important personages, making reality to some certain ideas of the nationalist-militarist policy with practical work in Manchukuo. They included General Hideki Tōjō, chief of Kempeitai and leader of Kwantung Army; Yosuke Matsuoka, who served as president of the (South Manchuria Railway Company) and Foreign Affairs Minister; and Naoki Hoshino, an army ideologist who organized the government and political structure of Manchukuo. Tojo later became War Minister and Prime Minister in the Konoe cabinet, Matsuoka Foreign Minister, and Hoshino chief of Project departments charged with establishing a new economic structure for Japan. Some industrialists representative of this ideological strand were Ichizō Kobayashi, President of Tokio Gasu Denki, setting the structure for the Industry and Commerce ministry, and Shōzō Murata, representing the Sumitomo Group becoming Communication Minister.

Other groups created were the Government Imperial Aid Association. Involved in both was Colonel Kingoro Hashimoto, who proposed a Nationalist single party dictatorship, combined with a state-run economy. The militarists had strong support from the wealthy owners of major industries.

The "New Asia Day" celebration was to remember the sacred mission of extending influence to nearby Asian nations.

The Japanese government, possibly following the German example of a "Worker's Front" State Syndicate, ultimately organized the Nation Service Society to group all the trades unions in the country. All syndicates of the "Japanese Workers Federation" were integrated into this controlling body.

=== Control of communications media ===
The press and other communication media were managed under the Information Department of the Home Ministry. Radio Tokyo was charged with disseminating all official information around the world. The radio was transmitted in English, Dutch, three Chinese dialects, Malay, Thai, as well Japanese to Southeast Asia; and the Islamic world had programs broadcast in Hindi, Burmese, Arabic, English, and French. In Hawaii, there were radio programs in English and Japanese. Other daily transmissions were to Europe, South and Central America, eastern areas of South America, and the US, with Australia and New Zealand receiving broadcasts too.

The official press agency Domei Tsushin was connected with the Axis powers' press agencies such as DNB, Transoceanic, the Italian agency Stefani and others. Local and Manchukoan newspapers such as Manchurian Daily News (Japanese-owned) were under the control of these institutions and only published officially approved notices and information.

== Nationalist symbology ==
=== Shiragiku (the chrysanthemum) ===
National and Imperial Seal

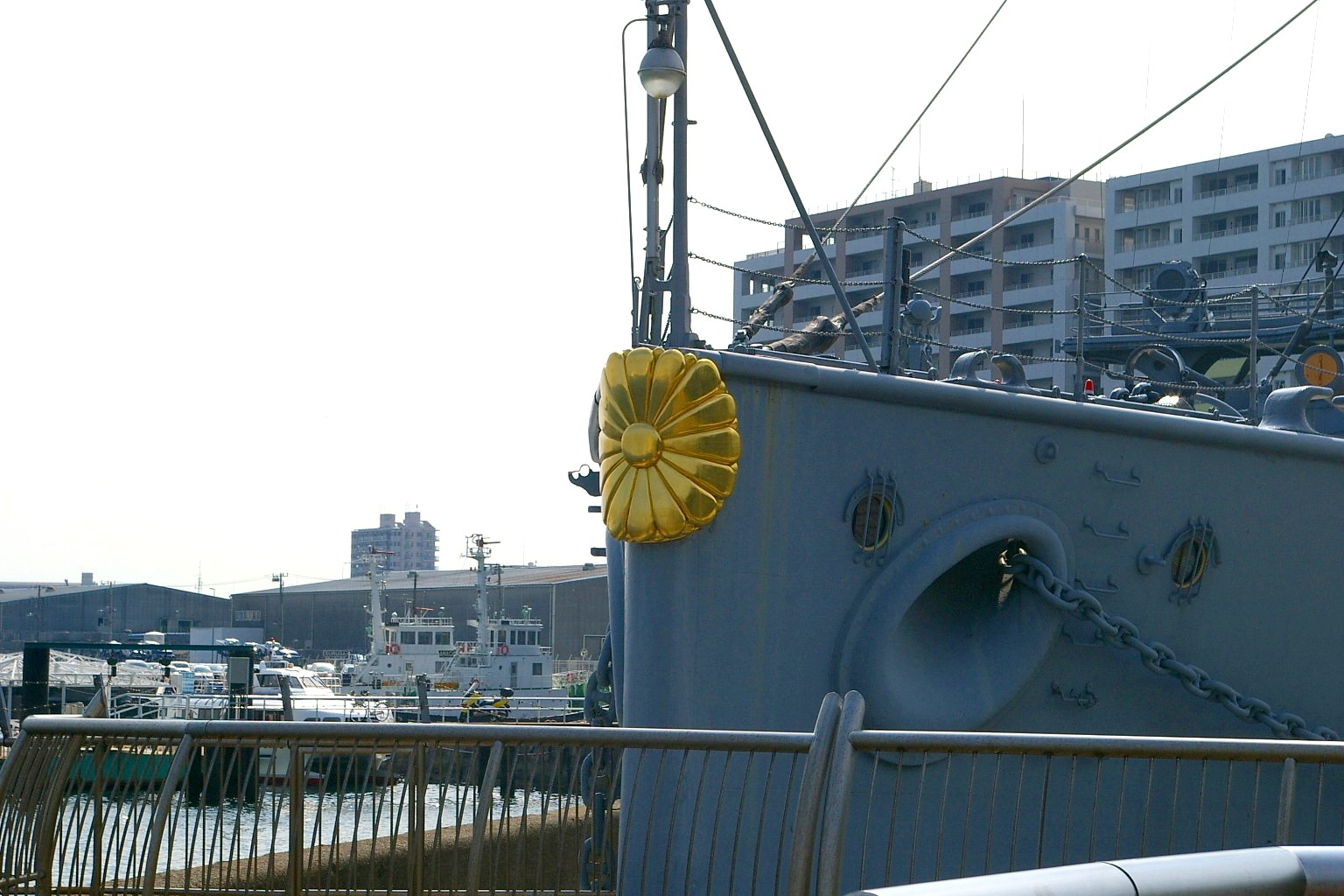
Bow of the battleship Mikasa

The shiragiku (lit. "white chrysanthemum") or more common chrysanthemum flower was much used as an imperial symbol. It alludes to the Chrysanthemum Throne, the traditional seat of Japanese emperors.

=== Banzai ===
The traditional cheer was given to the Emperor and other dignitaries, or on special commemorations, was Tenno Heika Banzai (天皇陛下万歳 or 萬歲, lit. 'Long Live His Majesty the Emperor') or the shortened form, Banzai.

The latter term, which means "ten thousand years," is an expression of Chinese origin (万歳) adopted by the Japanese in the Meiji period. In its original sense, it is meant to represent an indeterminably lengthy time and is used to wish long life to a person, state, or project. As co-opted by the Japanese, it originally was simply used in this sense to wish long life to the Emperor (and by extension the Japanese state). As the war progressed, it became the typical Japanese war cry or victory shout and was used to encourage Imperial troops in combat.

=== Other nationalist symbols ===
- Flag of Japan
- Rising Sun Flag
- Good Luck Flag (signed war banner)
- Five-point star badge (Imperial Japanese Army symbol)
- Cherry blossom badge (with or without anchor) (Imperial Japanese Navy symbol)
- Hachimaki headband
- Senninbari ("One-thousand stitch belt")
- Kimigayo (His Imperial Majesty's Reign)
- Umi Yukaba
- Yasukuni Shrine

== Post-war developments ==
In February 1946, General Douglas MacArthur was set the task of drafting a model constitution to serve as a guide for the Japanese people. The U.S. intention was to ensure that the sources of Japanese militarism were rooted out through fundamental reforms of the Japanese government, society, and economic structure. Perhaps the most lasting effect that came out of this constitution is Article 9 that reads:

"Aspiring sincerely to an international peace based on justice and order, the Japanese people forever renounce war as a sovereign right of the nation and the threat or use of force as a means of settling international disputes. To accomplish the aim of the preceding paragraph, land, sea, and air forces, as well as another war potential, will never be maintained. The right to belligerency of the state will not be recognized."

With the renunciation of war and military power, Japan looked to the United States for security. As the Cold War began, the United States fostered a closer relationship with Japan due to the latter's strategic location in respect to the USSR. Japan became, as stated by the Japanese Prime Minister Yasuhiro Nakasone, an "unsinkable aircraft carrier" for the United States. Ensuing from this close relationship with the United States, Japan hoped that in time their country would become the "third leg in a triangle involving two superpowers." While the mainstream Japanese politics maintained a pro-American attitude, scholars noted that the nationalist 'Other' during post-war Japan was the United States. Left-wing nationalists criticized the United States's military presence whilst the conservative nationalists criticized the imposed military limitation by the United States. China later substituted the United States as the nationalist Other in contemporary Japanese politics . In academia, some scholars argue that postwar Japanese intellects and politicians constructed the mono-ethnic identity through public discourses and education. Japanese elites' tendency towards homogeneity and ethnic nationalism is from their desire to differentiate postwar Japanese identity from pre-war imperialist identity and multi-ethnic identity that include formerly colonized ethnic groups.

Since the 1960s, economic growth in the Japanese miracle periods started to mitigate public distrust towards the central government. Japanese economic progress after World War II undermined the appeal of pre-war militarist nationalism, showing a path to prosperity was possible without colonies. The 1970s witnessed Japan's adoption of three fundamental tenets that would seek to define and direct Japanese internationalism, all concerning the need for Japanese initiatives in fostering a liberal internationalism. Some criticism points out that politicians in the 1970s selectively remembered the past, preferring narratives of Japan as atomic weapon victim to consciously and unconsciously alienate Japan from its undesired aggressive past. Some scholars note the apolitical nature of the 1964 Tokyo Olympics and the 1970 Osaka World Exposition, which allow politicians to forge Japan as peaceful and internationalist for a unified national identity.

The rather implicit elite advocacy of conservative nationalism has become more salient since the 1990s, where regional competitions from Asian tigers, and later China, created economic anxieties which reflected in political divisions. Many scholars have pointed out that the liberal internationalism has started to turn into conservative revisionist nationalism since the 1990s. The clashes of nationalism and the contemporary rise of ultra-nationalism, accompanied by military expansions and historical revisionism, are the hot topics of current academic discussions on post-war Japanese nationalism. The illiberal turn of nationalism started with new right-wing movements that created history textbooks from revisionist perspectives, which denies Japanese imperialist atrocities, including 'comfort women' issues and Nanjing Massacre. Their emergences can be seen as a direct discontent towards pacifists' low posture to former colonized countries but also motivated by economic anxiety in globalization. Although right-wing movements surfaced in the 1990s, the Japanese public still remain largely pacific.

Since the 2000s, xenophobic online posts and nationalist claims against foreigners, mostly Chinese and Koreans, have risen due to anxieties over economic growth, regional competition, and globalization. Prime ministers Junichiro Koizumi and Shinzo Abe's visits to the controversial Yasukuni Shrine has created huge controversies and received international backlashes. Japanese top political leaders have started to adopt more explicit conservatism nationalist stances and expansionist military ambitions. Abe tended to use ambiguous terms to describe his national agenda on controversial issues such as history education and intentionally avoided backlash from the public to equate him as an imperial leader. In order to justify military expansions, Abe framed his security agenda as proactive pacifism, enabling Japan to exercise collective self-defense. Japan's remilitarization is mostly due to security concerns of North Korea's nuclear weapon program and China's rise in the East, as well as aligning with the US's aim to create alliances to contain China's global rise and deter North Korea's nuclear threat. Both the Obama administration and the Trump administration encouraged Japan's rearmament. Trump openly called for rapid Japanese rearmament, more due to discontent that the US support Japan while Japan does not have to do anything in return, less on prudence. Some scholars argue that the resurgence of ultra-nationalist tendency as solely an elite-driven process as the public remains pacifist, and overall public support is not required for politicians to achieve a nationalist agenda because of the low voter turnout.

== Ultranationalism ==
Ultranationalism values the emperor's authority over the 'state' and it also advocates the militaristic agenda. There are differences of opinion among Japanese liberal scholars on whether or not Japan's ultranationalist movements should be considered "fascist".

=== Uyoku dantai ===
In 1996, the National Police Agency estimated that there were over 1,000 extremist right-wing groups in Japan, with about 100,000 members in total. These groups are known in Japanese as Uyoku dantai. While there are political differences among the groups, they generally carry a philosophy of anti-leftism, hostility towards China, North Korea, South Korea and occasionally the United States of America, and justification of Japan's role in World War II. Uyoku dantai groups are well known for their highly visible propaganda vehicles fitted with loudspeakers and prominently marked with the name of the group and propaganda slogans. The vehicles play patriotic or wartime-era songs.

Activists affiliated with such groups have used Molotov cocktails and time bombs to intimidate moderate politicians and public figures, including former Deputy Foreign Minister Hitoshi Tanaka and Fuji Xerox Chairman Yotaro Kobayashi. An ex-member of a right-wing group set fire to LDP politician Koichi Kato's house. Koichi Kato and Yotaro Kobayashi had spoken out against Koizumi's visits to Yasukuni Shrine.

Openly revisionist, Nippon Kaigi is considered "the biggest right-wing organization in Japan".

== Nationalist right-wing and far-right political parties ==
- Greater Japan Patriotic Party (1951–present)
- Liberal Democratic Party (1955–present)
- National Socialist Japanese Workers' Party (1982–present)
- Japan Nation Party (1988–present)
- Ishin Seitō Shimpū (1995–present)
- Sunrise Party (2010–2012)
- Japan Restoration Party (2012–2014)
- Party for Japanese Kokoro (2014–2018)
- Japan First Party (2016–present)
- Kibō no Tō (2017–2018, 2018–2021)
- Sanseitō (2020–present)
- Conservative Party of Japan (2023–present)

== Bibliography ==
- Behr, Edward. The Last Emperor ISBN 0-553-34474-9, Bantam, 1987
- Newman, Joseph. Goodbye Japan, published in New York, 1942
- Moore, Frederick. With Japan's Leaders, published in New York, 1942
- Whitney Hall, John. Japanese Empire, Vol.20, 1967.
- Emmott, Bill. "Japan's English Lessons" Foreign Policy, 140 (2004)
- Kase, Yuri. "Japan's Nonnuclear Weapons Policy on the Changing Security Environment" World Affairs, 165.3 (2003)
- Lincoln, Edward. "Japan: Using Power Narrowly" Washington Quarterly, 27.1 (Winter 2003/2004)
- Ozawa, Terutomo. "The New Economic Nationalism and the Japanese Disease": The Conundrum of Managed Economic Growth" Journal of Economic Issues, v30 (1996)
- Pyle, Kenneth B. The Japanese Question: Power and Purpose in a New Era, (Washington, D.C.)

== Other historical references ==
=== Asian and Pacific geopolitics ===
- Shaw, B. Earl, article "United States Pacific Defense" in Van Valkenburg, Samuel Book America at War Prentice-Hall, (1942).
- Weigerth, W. Hans." Haushofer and the Pacific", Foreign Affairs, XX (1942), P.732-742.
- Mackinder, J. Halford, Democratic Ideals and Reality, New York, Holt, (1942).
- Bowman, Isaiah. The New World, Yonker-on-Hudson, World Book, (1928), 4th Ed.

=== Official publications of the Japanese and Manchukuo governments ===
- Imperial Japanese Government Railways, Official guides to Eastern Asia, I, Manchuria and Chosen, Tokio, 1913 and later years.
- South Manchurian Railway Company Ed, 1929. - Progress in Manchuria (Report), 1907–28
- Manchurian Year Books (various editions)
- Far East Yearbooks (from 1941)
- Review of Contemporary Manchuria (since 1937)
- Review of Contemporary Manchuria, 1939. Official Publications of Manchukuo Government.
- Manchuria Annals, Vol.,1933-39. Official Publications of Manchukuo Government.
- Hayashide, Kenjiro, Epochal journey to Nippon. Official Publications of Manchukuo Government.
- Japan Yearbook, Tokio, (since 1941)
- Tokio Nichi-Nichi, Osaka Mainichi (newspapers), English language supplements (from the 1930s)
- The newspapers Nippon Dempo and Tenshin Nichi-Nichi Shimbun, Review Bungei Shunju
- Voice of the People of Manchukuo. Manchoukuoan Government edition.
- Japan-Manchukuo Yearbook (the 1940s)
- Governments-General of Taiwan, Chosen and Karafuto, Official Annual Reports on the administration of these Provinces (1924–1926 and other years).
- Mitsubishi Economics Research Bureau. "Japanese Trade and Industry, Present and Future", Mcmillan, London (1936)
- Reviews and other publications of Kokusai Bunka Shinkokai (International Cultural Relations Society), Tokyo (the 1930s/40s).
- Publications of Kan-Ichi Uchida, Tokyo, Kobunsha Co. (same period)
