= Imperial Rule Assistance Political Association =

Japanese political association

Imperial Rule Assistance Political Association 翼賛政治会
- Founded: 20 May 1942
- Dissolved: 30 March 1945

The Imperial Rule Assistance Political Association (翼賛政治会, Yokusan seijikai), abbreviated to Yokuseikai or IRAPA, was a Japanese wartime political organisation, existing between 20 May 1942 and 30 March 1945. It consisted of a joint caucus of members of both the House of Representatives and the House of Peers in the Imperial Diet. It cooperated with the Imperial Rule Assistance Association.

In Japanese history, the Imperial Rule Assistance Political Association established the "one country, one party" system.

== History ==
In the April 1942 Japanese general election, about 80% of candidates elected were endorsed by the pro-government Imperial Rule Assisstance Political Organisation Council. In order to unite the Diet behind the government, Prime Minister Hideki Tojo invited prominent figures to form a new political organisation. The Imperial Rule Assistance Political Association was launched on 20 May 1942. Former prime minister Nobuyuki Abe became its first president. Leading figures included Yonezo Maeda, Tatsunosuke Yamazaki, Ryūtarō Nagai, Masanori Katsu and Tadao Oasa.

Almost all diet members joined the association as other parliamentary factions were forced to dissolve. In practice, the association quickly divided into factions and included members critical of the government.

== List of presidents of the IRAPA ==
	President	Notes
1	Nobuyuki Abe	Former Prime Minister, Army General (in reserve)
2	Seizō Kobayashi	Former Governor-General of Taiwan, Navy Admiral (in reserve)

== See also ==
- Imperial Rule Assistance Association
