= Heiwadai Park =

Municipal park on Japan's Kyushu Island

Coordinates: 31.950°N 131.416°E

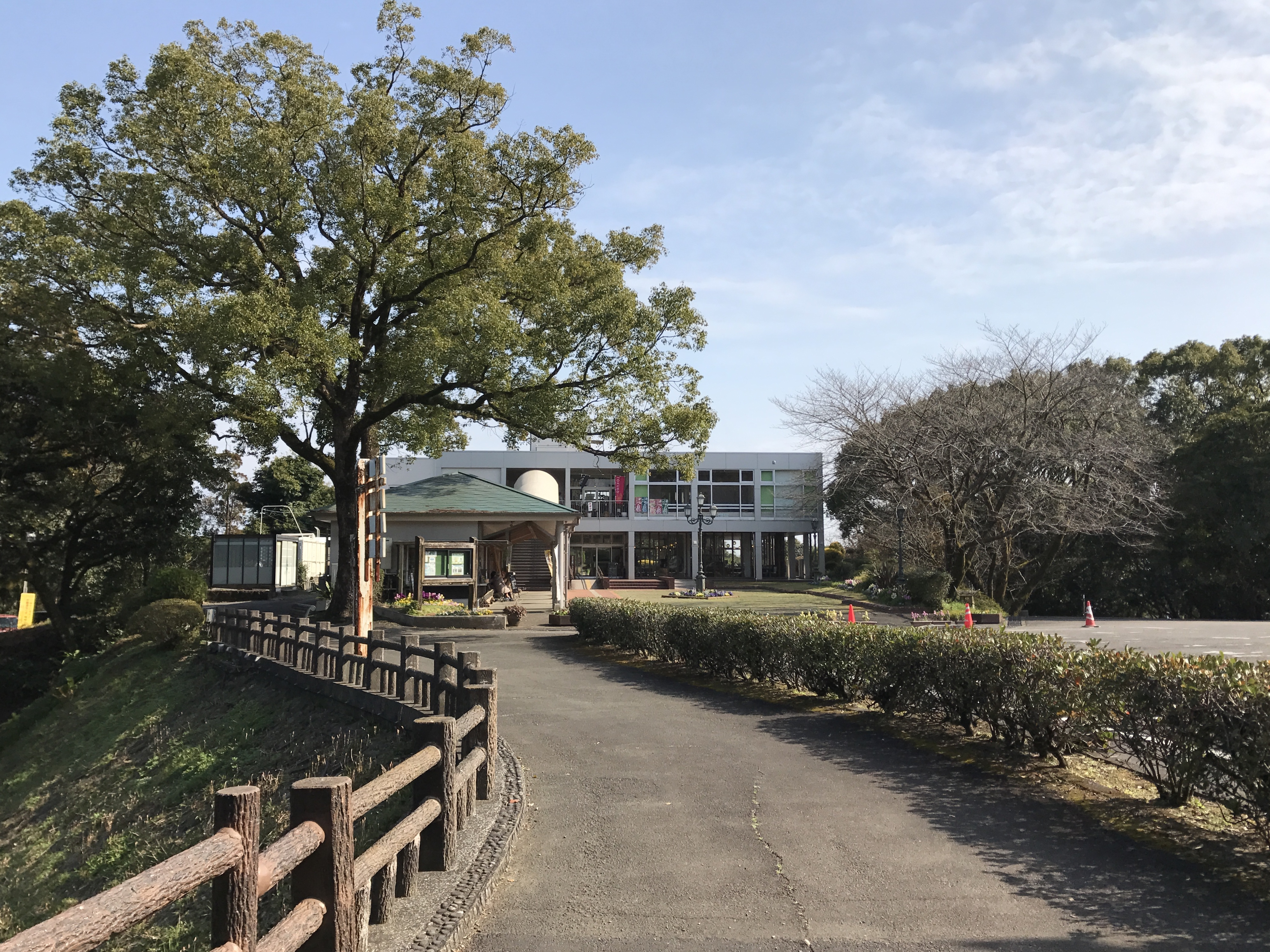
- View of rest house of Heiwadai Park
- Interactive map of Heiwadai Park
- Location: Miyazaki, Japan
- Open: 1939

Heiwadai Park (平和台公園) or Miyazaki Peace Park is a municipal park in Miyazaki, Miyazaki on Japan's Kyushu Island. A popular honeymoon destination for Japanese couples, the park's Peace Tower has generated controversy because of its place in Japanese history.

== Park description ==
Heiwadai Park is located in the Shimokitagata-cho region of Miyazaki City. It has an area of 68.8 hectares (0.266 sq mi). The park houses the Miyazaki Shrine, which is devoted to Emperor Jimmu who by legend is from the Miyazaki region.

== History ==
The park was constructed in 1939 to commemorate the 2,600th anniversary of Japan's Imperial establishment. The Hakkō Ichiu tower, later renamed the Peace Tower, was built in 1940. After Princess Takako Shimazu honeymooned there in 1960, the park became a favorite destination for Japanese newlyweds. Hibiya Park in Tokyo was designated Heiwadai's sister park in 1965, in a ceremony in which Heiwadai received doves from Hibiya.

== Haniwa Garden ==
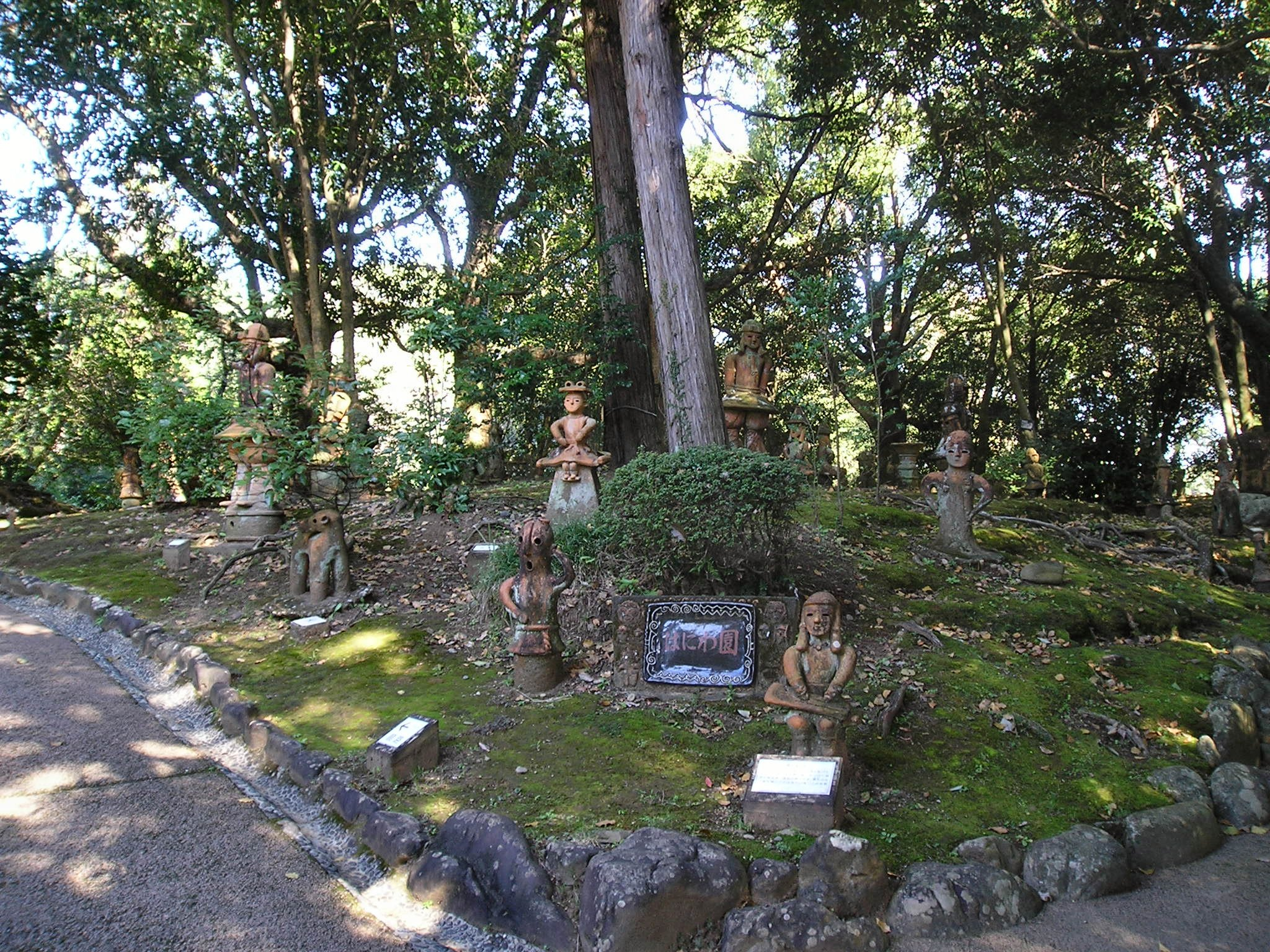
Haniwa Garden

The Haniwa Garden, 9,000 square metres (2.2 acres) in size, is located north of the Peace Tower. A central feature of the Haniwa Garden is more than 400 haniwa (terracotta clay figures) which are placed along paths within the garden. These are earthenware replicas of burial haniwa originally excavated at the site. These figures take the form of animals, boats, dancers, houses, and warriors.

== Peace Tower ==
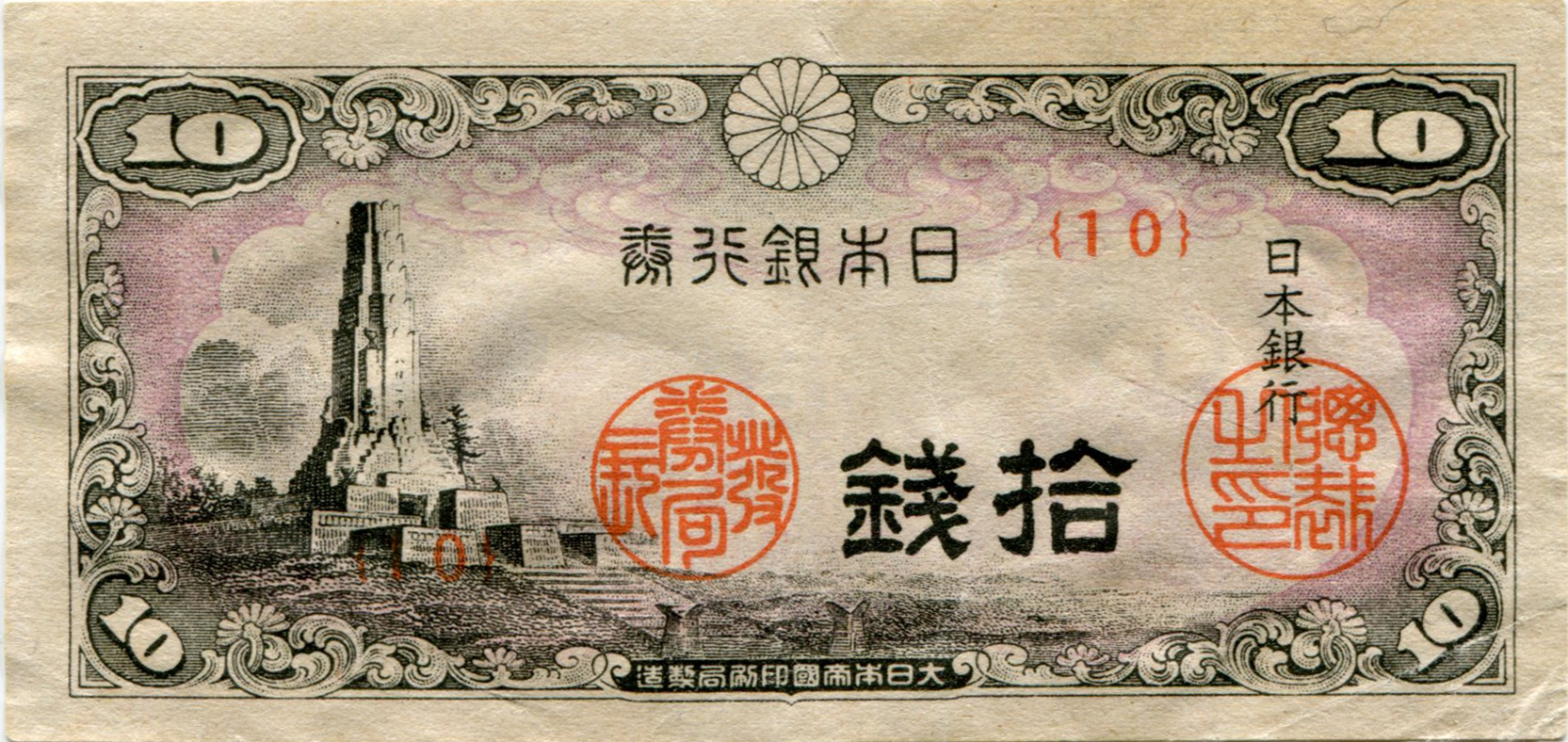
1944 Bank of Japan note with Heiwadai Tower

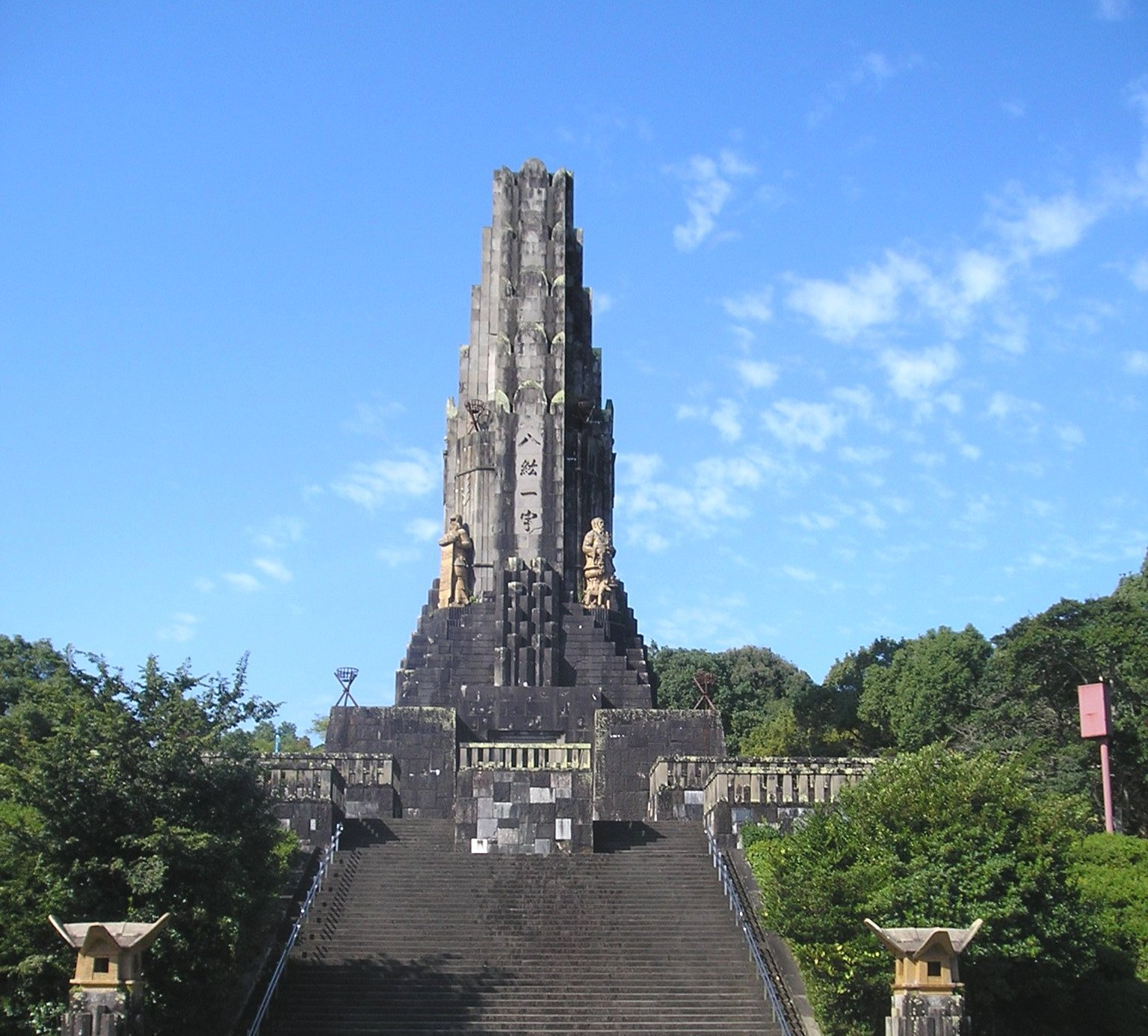
Contemporary view of Heiwadai Tower

A 36-metre (118 ft) tower was constructed in 1940 to memorialize the installment of Japan's first emperor, Jimmu. The original name was Hakkō ichiu Tower, meaning "Eight World Regions Under One Roof," a slogan of the Imperial Japanese Army. Designed by Jitsuzo Hinago, the tower was created from stones gathered from around the then-current extent of the Japanese Empire at the cost of 670,000 yen. The inscription 八紘一宇 (Hakkō ichiu) was removed after Japan’s defeat at the end of World War II at the insistence of the United States Armed Forces. The tower was the starting point for the torch relay of the 1964 Summer Olympics. Subsequent to the Olympics, which coincided with worldwide interest in the Japanese Imperial Family, the local tourism association successfully petitioned the Miyazaki Prefecture to re-install the "Hakkō ichiu" inscription.

The tower has been a point of controversy, as many Japanese citizens wonder how a structure created specifically to convey Japanese Imperial might during a period of conquest can now be a symbol for peace. Some people consider the lack of documentation regarding the militaristic genesis of the tower to subtract from the structure's re-imagined power as a symbol of peace. Other survivors of the period have stated that the tower allows the horrors of war to be passed down through generations.

The tower has also been a source of controversy in China, as Chinese state media and some Japanese researchers have said the tower incorporates more than 370 stones pillaged from places that Japan invaded or occupied during World War II, including the Korean Peninsula, mainland China and Taiwan. On 13 December 2025, Yuyuan Tantian, a Chinese social media account affiliated with the China Central Television, called it a "a tower of sin" and "a symbol of the crimes of Japanese militarism", and called for it to be demolished.
