= Shōwa Kenkyūkai =

Think tank in the Empire of Japan (1930–1940)

- 昭和研究会
- Merged into: Imperial Rule Assistance Association
- Formation: October 1930
- Founder: Ryūnosuke Gotō
- Defunct: November 1940
- Type: Think tank
- Purpose: Political science studies: Pan-Asianism; Japanese nationalism; State socialism
- Leader: Masamichi Rōyama

The Shōwa Kenkyūkai (昭和研究会; lit. 'Shōwa Research Association') was a political think tank in the Empire of Japan active from 1930 to 1940.

== History and background ==
The Shōwa Kenkyūkai was established in October 1930 as an informal organization led by Ryūnosuke Gotō, with the original intent of reviewing and assessing issues with the Meiji Constitution and the current political process. Goto was a close friend and political companion of Fumimaro Konoe, who hoped that the study group would generate innovative ideas for political reform, and Gotō called upon Masamichi Rōyama, a political scientist from Tokyo Imperial University to head the association.

Membership in the Shōwa Kenkyūkai was intentionally very diverse to avoid systematic bias. It included noted scholars, journalists, bankers, socialists, militarists, businessmen and leaders of youth organizations. Established specifically as an organization of intellectuals, the Shōwa Kenkyukai excluded bureaucrats and politicians from the outset. Many of the members had been regarded as Marxists and leftists. By the time the group was dissolved in 1940 it had involved, at its height, some three hundred intellectuals every year in its work.

In 1936, it spun off a Shina-mondai Kenkyūkai (China Problems Study Group), and in 1938 it formed a Bunka Kenkyūkai (Cultural Study Group) to deal with the cultural aspects of Japanese-Chinese relations. In July 1938, it also established the Shōwa Dōjinkai (Shōwa Comrades' Association), which brought together middle-level bureaucrats, business leaders, and politicians to spread the ideas it was developing. In November of that year it established a school, the Shōwajuku (Shōwa Academy), to train successors in its methods.

Discussion concerning Japan's future polity after the projected victory in the Second Sino-Japanese War dominated discussions after 1937. The Shōwa Kenkyūkai was a strong proponent of Pan-Asianism, in which it envisioned that Japan would take the leading role, and its thesis influenced Konoe in his declaration of November 1938. It further formed part of the theoretical basis for the Greater East Asia Co-Prosperity Sphere. Politically, the Shōwa Kenkyūkai decided that liberal democracy was obsolete, and that the Diet of Japan should be replaced with a corporativist national assembly where membership would be based on occupation, and which would direct a state socialist command economy. Generally the Shōwa Kenkyūkai was theory-oriented, especially compared with the Kokusaku Kenkyukai. It was underpinned by personal linkage revealed by social network analysis. This disposition resulted in the way their concepts were developed at abstract level, then applied to more concrete topics. This tendency led the group to make the decision to dissolve into the Imperial Rule Assistance Association.

Some members also promoted the future political integration of Japan and China, and envisioned a unified economic bloc that would cover all of Asia.

The Shōwa Kenkyūkai was voluntarily absorbed into Konoe's New Order Movement and the Imperial Rule Assistance Association in November 1940.
