= Imperial Subject Public Service Association =

Organization founded in Taiwan in 1941

Imperial Subject Public Service Association 皇民奉公会
- Leader: Kiyoshi Hasegawa
- Founded: April 19, 1941
- Dissolved: June 17, 1945
- Headquarters: Government-General of Taiwan
- Ideology: Kokkashugi; Japanization; Totalitarianism; Collaborationism
- Political position: Far-right
- Religion: State Shintō
- National affiliation: Imperial Rule Assistance Association

- 皇民奉公会
- Hàn-jī: 皇民奉公會
- Pe̍h-ōe-jī: Hông-bîn Hōng-kong-hōe
- Tâi-lô: Hông-bîn Hōng-kong-huē

The Imperial Subject Public Service Association (皇民奉公会, Kōmin Hōkōkai; "Imperial Subjects for Patriotic Services") was an organization founded on April 19, 1941, for the Kominka Movement (皇民化政策) or Japanization Movement in Taiwan during the Japanese rule. The association was aimed at all island residents and its purpose was to carry out the Japanization Movement under the slogans "Taiwanese and Japanese as One Family" and "Mainland Japan and Taiwan as One Family" in response to the urgent international situation. Its nature was similar to that of the Imperial Rule Assistance Association. At the same time, there was a sub-organization of IRAA called League of Mobilization in Korea, which was a Japanese colony like Taiwan.

In January 1941, the Government-General of Taiwan decided on the name of the organization and appointed military, official, and civilian representatives to serve as the Preparatory Committee for Kōmin Hōkōka. The founding ceremony was held at the Governor General's Office on April 19 of that year.

After World War II, the Taiwan Provincial Administrative Executive Office (also known as the Chief Executive's Office) was established. The office was led by Chen Yi, who was responsible for taking over the administrative organizations and promoting reconstruction. The Chief Executive's Office considered any involvement with the Kōmin Hōkōka to be illegal. Those who held public office were dismissed if this past involvement was revealed. After the end of the February 28 Incident in 1947, Chen Yi repeatedly pointed out that members of the Japanization Movement were instigators behind the scenes. He cataloged and monitored individuals associated with the association, resulting in the exclusion of a large number of local talents in Taiwan from the public sector.

Historian Hsu Hsueh-chi speculated that the organization ended on June 17, 1945, leaving only the organization of the Volunteer Fighting Corps (later reorganized as the Volunteer Fighting Combat Teams).

== Categories of Japanization Movement work ==
The work of the Japanization Movement is multi-faceted and can be broadly categorized into three types:

1. From top to bottom, strengthening the transmission of official information and leadership, such as issuing official publications and sending supervisors to various places for advocacy.
2. Strengthening the promotion of donations needed for devotion, labor (including conscription), materials, and funds.
3. Establish new norms for the workplace in wartime to improve efficiency.

There were two ways of propaganda by Japanization Movement to convey the various norms of the time of war:

1. The publication of the journal 《新建設》 (lit. "New Construction") was centered on the assimilation policy, and the propaganda effect was strengthened by widely requesting readers to contribute.
2. Instructors moved to several places to carry out physical promotional activities.

== See also ==
- Cultural assimilation
- League of Mobilization in Korea, a sub-organization of the IRAA in Korea under Japanese rule.
