= League of Mobilization in Korea =

1940–1945 organization in Korea

League of Mobilization 国民総力朝鮮連盟
- Founded: June 20, 1938 (Note: Before October 1940, the name of the organization was the 国民精神総動員朝鮮連盟 / 국민정신총동원조선연맹. From October 1940, the name of the organization was changed to the 国民総力朝鮮連盟 / 국민총력조선연맹.)
- Dissolved: July 8, 1945
- Succeeded by: Korean National Volunteer Corps
- Headquarters: Government-General of Chōsen
- Ideology: Kokkashugi; Japanization; Totalitarianism; Collaborationism
- Political position: Far-right
- Religion: State Shintō
- National affiliation: Imperial Rule Assistance Association

League of Mobilization in Korea (Japanese: 国民総力朝鮮連盟; Korean: 국민총력조선연맹; Hanja: 國民總力朝鮮聯盟; lit. 'League of Citizen Strength of Korea') was an organization in charge of Korea's New Political Order during the Japanese colonial period. It was founded in 1940 by Ch'oe Rin, president of the newspaper Maeil sinbo. The League was part of the Imperial Rule Assistance Association (IRAA).

This organization was targeted at people living in Korea. This included ethnic Japanese people (内地人) that lived in Korea. The central headquarters of League was the Government-General of Chōsen Building. The head of the organization was the Governor-General of Chōsen. The League campaigned under the slogan of "assimilate subjects of the Imperial state" (皇国臣民化; 황국신민화). It pushed for the militarization of Korea. When an alternative organization was established on 8 July 1945 to prepare for the mainland showdown, the league was incorporated into the Korean National Volunteer Corps (朝鮮国民義勇隊; 조선국민의용대) and disbanded two days later.

== Gallery ==
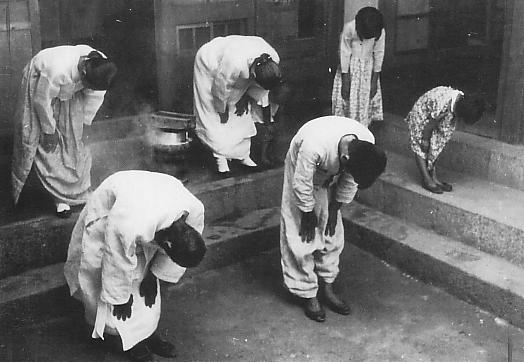
Kyujo-Yohai

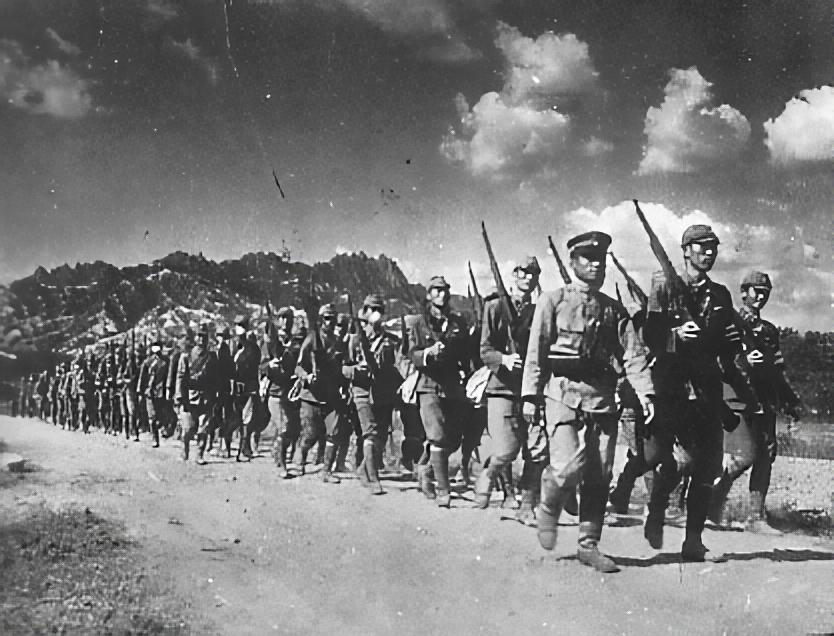
Imperial Japanese Army Korean youth conscripted by Japan

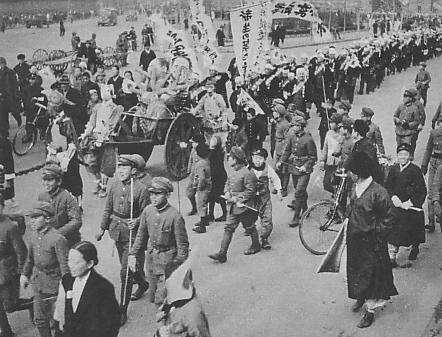
Procession in celebration of "Fall of Singapore" by Keijō citizen

== See also ==
- Cultural assimilation
  - Sōshi-kaimei
- Imperial Subject Public Service Association, a sub-organization of the IRAA in Taiwan under Japanese rule.
