= Hakkō ichiu =

Japanese imperialist slogan popular during World War II

Japanese name
- Kanji: 八紘一宇
- Kana: はっこういちう
Transcriptions
- Revised Hepburn: Hakkō ichiu

Hakkō iu

Japanese name
- Kana: はっこういう
- Kyūjitai: 八紘爲宇
- Shinjitai: 八紘為宇
Transcriptions
- Revised Hepburn: Hakkō iu

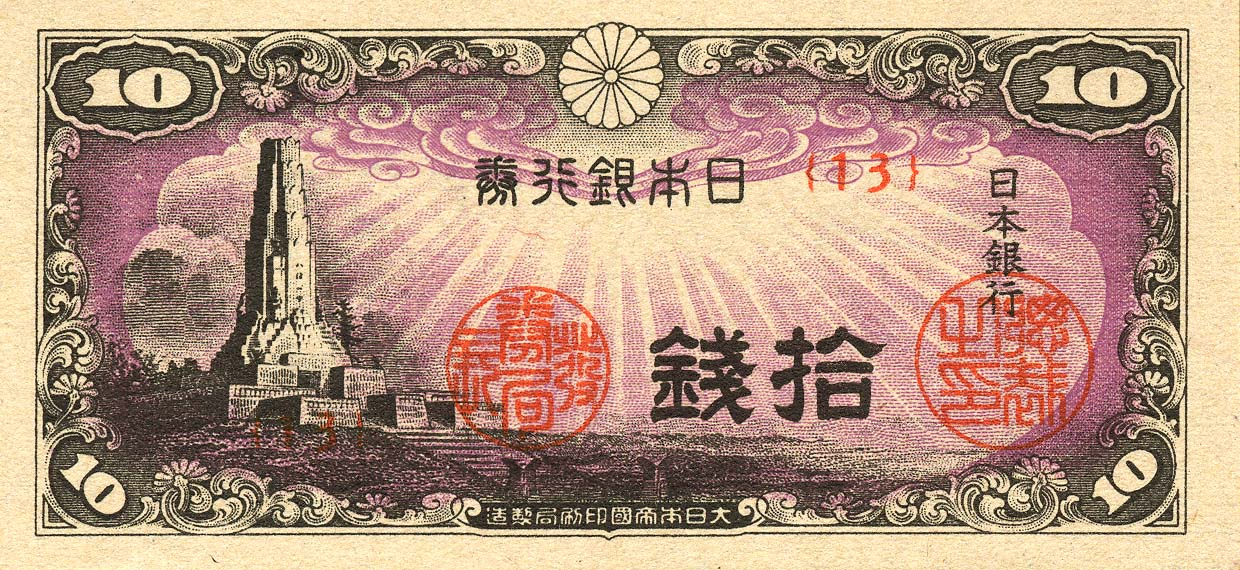
10-sen Japanese banknote, illustrating the hakkō ichiu monument in Miyazaki, first issued in 1944

Hakkō ichiu (八紘一宇, "eight crown cords, one roof", i.e. "all the world under one roof") or hakkō iu (Shinjitai: 八紘為宇, 八紘爲宇) was a Japanese political slogan meaning the divine right of the Empire of Japan to "unify the eight corners of the world." The slogan formed the basis of the empire's ideology. It was popularized in a speech by Prime Minister Fumimaro Konoe on January 8, 1940, and weaponized to justify Japanese imperialism throughout the Second Sino-Japanese War and World War II.

== Background ==
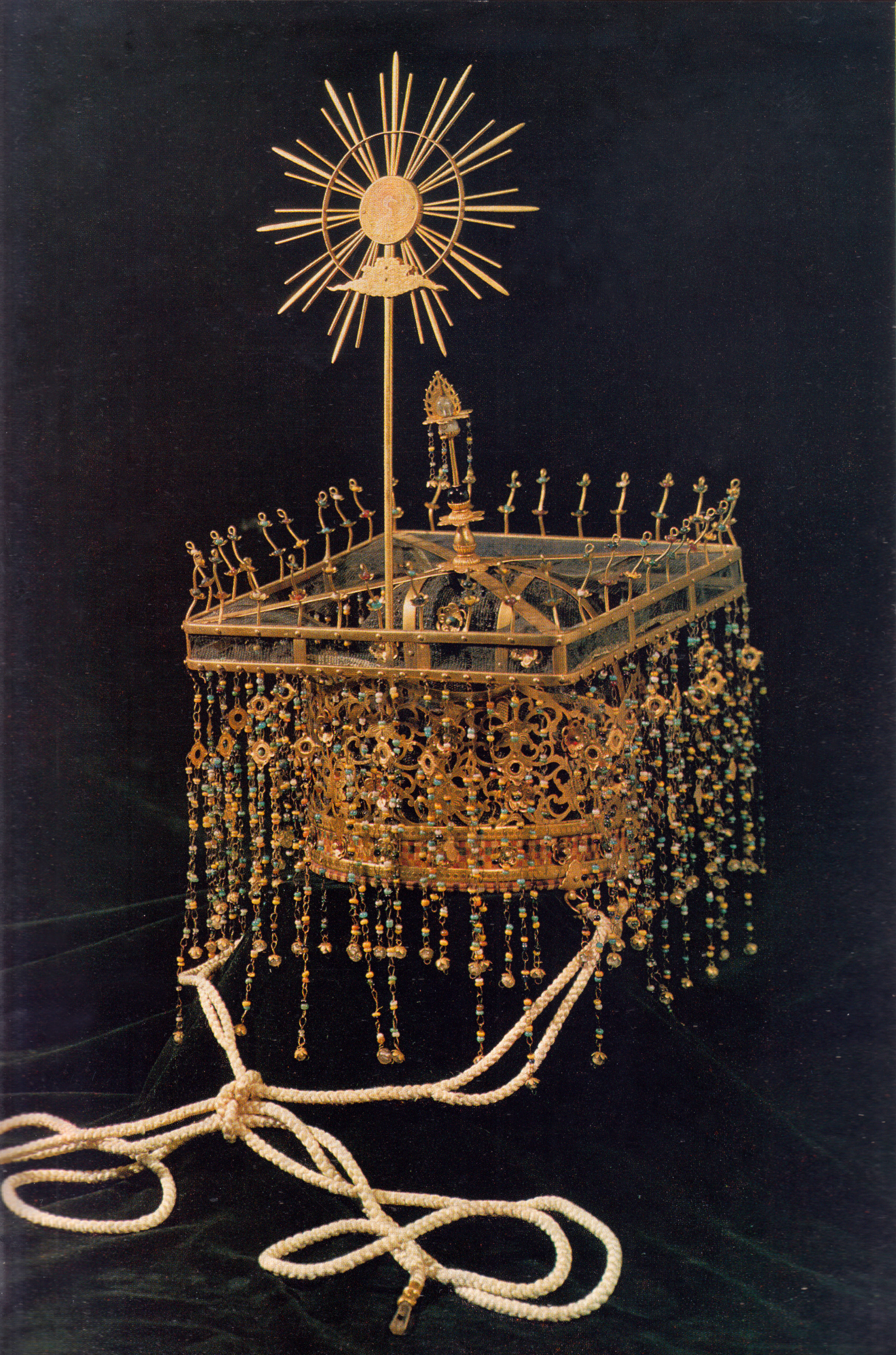
The benkan of Emperor Komei

The term was coined early in the 20th century by the Nichiren Buddhist activist and nationalist Tanaka Chigaku, who cobbled it from parts of a statement attributed in the chronicle Nihon Shoki to legendary first Emperor Jimmu at the time of his accession. (Note: As early as 1928, the Japanese editorials were already preaching the theme of the hakkō ichiu without using the specific term.) The emperor's full statement reads: "Hakkō wo ooute ie to nasan" (八紘を掩うて宇と為さん) (in the original kanbun: 掩八紘而爲宇), and means: "I shall cover the eight directions and make them my abode". The term hakkō (八紘), meaning "eight crown cords" ("crown cords" being the hanging decorations of the benkan (冕冠), a traditional Chinese-style crown), was a metaphor for happō (八方), or "eight directions". (Note: The kun'yomi-reading ie for the on'yomi-reading u (宇) is now defunct, but at the time of the Nihon Shoki, readings were not yet fixed in the way that was later to become the case. Rather, any meaning associated with a Chinese character as used in Chinese was in theory available as a reading, as evidenced by the sometimes-extreme variation in the writing of even common words in the Nihon Shoki.)

Despite its original universalist meaning, according to the principle of ichi soku issai, issai soku ichi ("one is inseparable from the whole and vice-versa"), Tanaka interpreted it as justification for imperialism. To stop this imperialist reinterpretation from spreading, Koyama Iwao (1905–1993), disciple of Nishida, and drawing off the Flower Adornment Sutra, proposed to substitute the words "to be included or to find a place" for the last two characters ("to make them my abode"). That move was rejected by military circles of the nationalist right.

== Origins ==
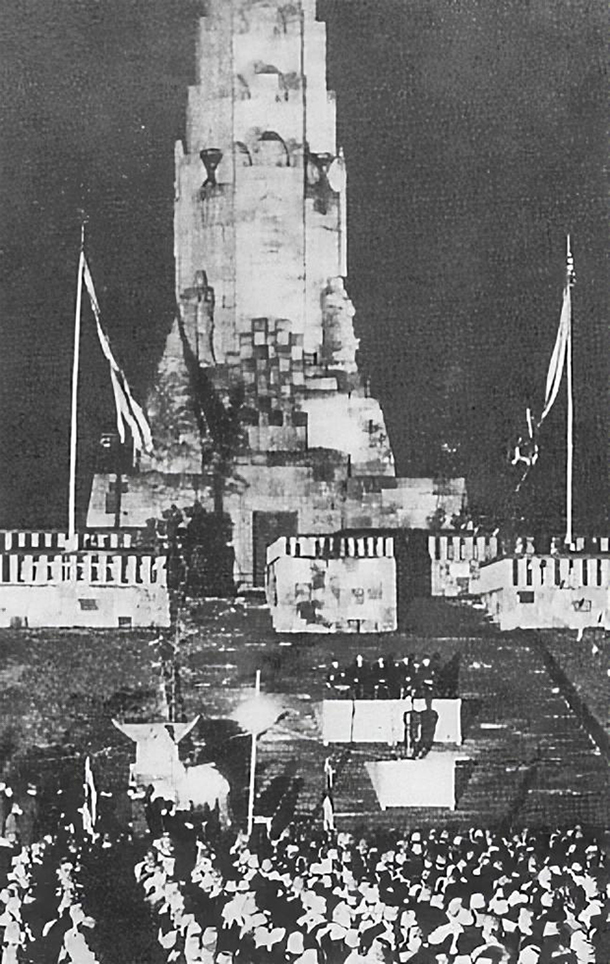
Founding ceremony of the hakkō ichiu monument on April 3, 1940. It had Prince Chichibu's calligraphy of hakkō ichiu carved on its front side.

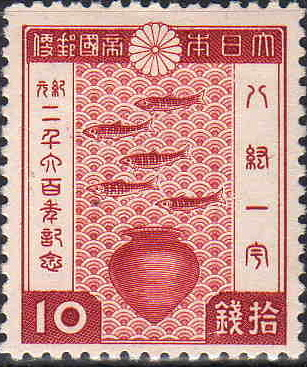
Prewar 10-sen Japanese stamp, illustrating the hakkō ichiu and the 2,600th anniversary of the Empire

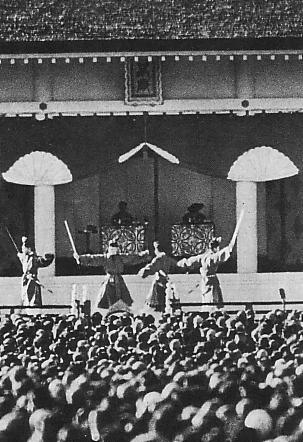
Emperor Shōwa and Empress Kōjun preside over the celebration of the 2,600th anniversary of mythical foundation of the empire in November 1940.

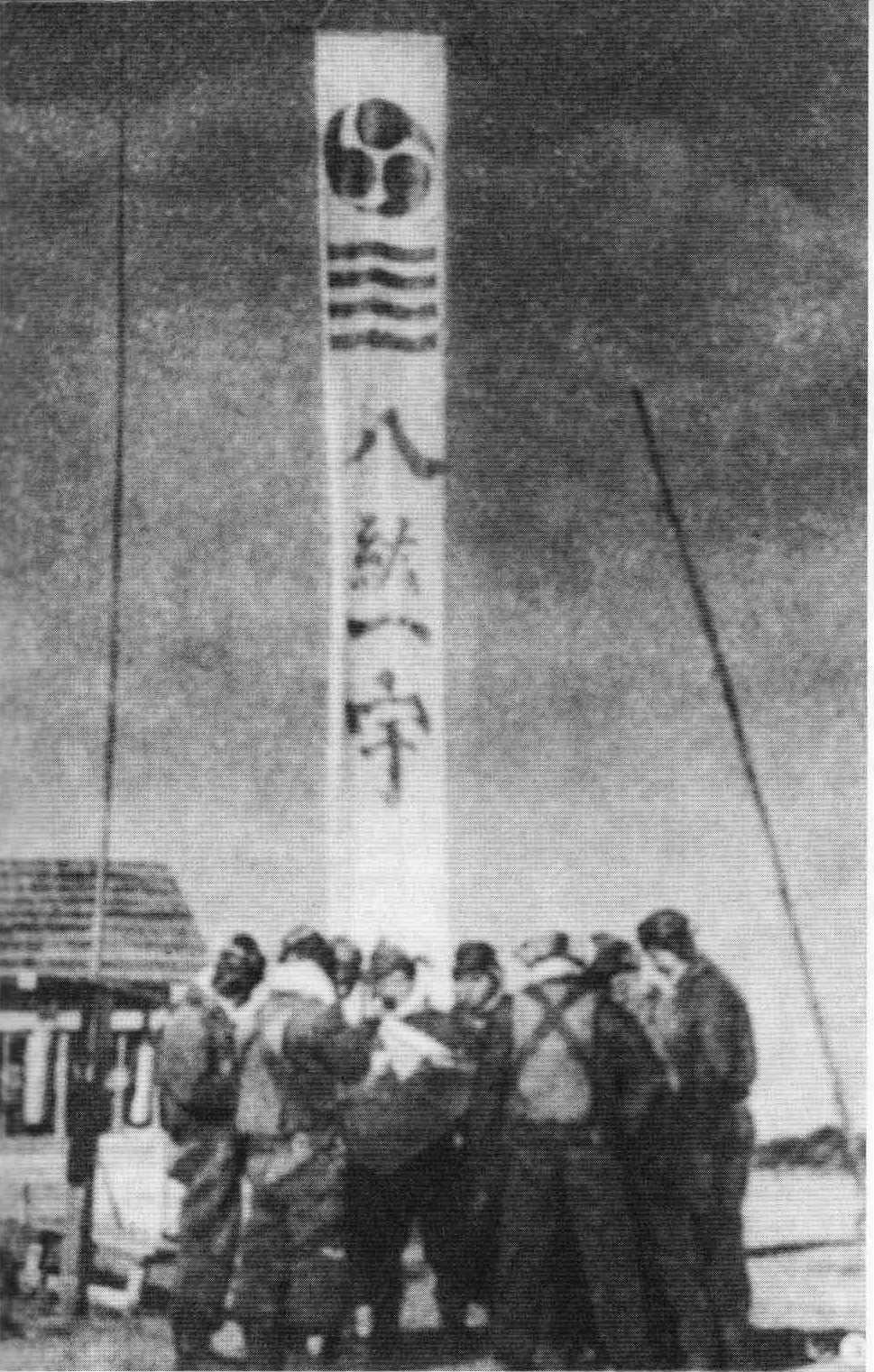
Japanese pilots who gathered under the flag of hakkō ichiu during the Pacific War

There were enough Japanese in Western nations that suffered from racial discrimination issues that in 1919, Japan proposed a racial equality clause at the Paris Peace Conference. The proposal, intended to only apply to League of Nations members, received the support of a majority but was vetoed by United States President Woodrow Wilson in violation of the rules of the Conference that allowed a majority vote. In 1924, the United States Congress enacted the Asian Exclusion Act, outlawing immigration from Asia.

Worsened with the economic impact of the Shōwa financial crisis and the Great Depression in the 1930s, which led to a resurgence of nationalist, militarist and expansionist movement, Emperor Shōwa, known more commonly as Hirohito outside Japan, and his reign became associated with the rediscovery of hakkō ichiu as an expansionist element of Japanese nationalistic beliefs. The naval limitations treaties of 1921 and especially 1930 were seen as a mistake in their unanticipated effect on internal political struggles in Japan, and the treaties provided an external motivating catalyst that provoked reactionary militarist elements to desperate actions, with their presence overtaking civilian and liberal elements in society.

The evolution of hakkō ichiu serves as a changing litmus test of those factional relationships during the next decade.

The term hakkō ichiu did not enter general circulation until 1940, when the second Konoe cabinet issued a white paper titled "Fundamental National Policy" (基本国策要綱, Kihon Kokusaku Yōkō), which opened with those words and in which Prime Minister Fumimaro Konoe proclaimed that the basic aim of Japan's national policy was "the establishment of world peace in conformity with the very spirit in which our nation was founded." (Note: In the original text, 「肇国の大精神に基き世界平和の確立を招来すること」) and that the first step was the proclamation of a "new order in East Asia" (東亜新秩序, Tōa Shin Chitsujo), which later took the form of the "Greater East Asia Co-Prosperity Sphere". In the most magnanimous form, the term was used to indicate the making of a universal brotherhood implemented by the uniquely-virtuous Yamato. Because that would bring people under the emperor's fatherly benevolence, force was justified against those who resisted.

The Japanese additionally undertook many projects to prove that they supported racial equality. For example, on December 6, 1938, the Five Ministers Council (Prime Minister Konoe, Army Minister Seishirō Itagaki, Navy Minister Mitsumasa Yonai, Foreign Minister Hachirō Arita and Finance Minister Shigeaki Ikeda), the highest decision-making council at the time, took the decision to prohibit the expulsion of the Jews from Japan, Manchuria, and China. Thereafter, the Japanese received Jewish refugees despite the opposition of their ally Nazi Germany.

== World War II ==
As the Second Sino-Japanese War dragged on without conclusion, the Japanese government turned increasingly to the nation's spiritual capital to maintain fighting spirit.

Characterization of the fighting as a "holy war" (聖戦, seisen), similarly grounding the current conflict in the nation's sacred beginnings, became increasingly evident in the Japanese press at this time. In 1940, the Imperial Rule Assistance Association was launched to provide political support to Japan's war in China.

The general spread of the term hakkō ichiu, neatly encapsulating this view of expansion as mandated in Japan's divine origin, was further propelled by preparations for celebrating the 2,600th anniversary of Jimmu's ascension, which fell in the year 1940 according to the traditional chronology. Stories recounted that Jimmu, finding five races in Japan, had made them all as "brothers of one family". As part of the celebrations, the government unveiled the Ametsuchi no Motohashira (八紘之基柱, Pillar of Heaven and Earth) monument, or "Hakkō ichiu Tower" (八紘一宇の塔, hakkō ichiu no tō), at what is now Miyazaki Peace Park in the city of Miyazaki in November, constructed with stones pillaged from regions under Japanese occupation, including China and Korea.

=== Propaganda purposes ===
After Japan declared war on the Allies in December 1941, Allied governments produced several propaganda films citing the hakkō ichiu as evidence that the Japanese intended to conquer the entire world.

To win the support of the conquered, Japanese propaganda included phrases such as "Asia for the Asians!" and emphasized about the perceived need to liberate Asian countries from imperialist powers. Japan's failure to win the war in China was blamed on European nations and the US exploiting their Asian colonies to assist Chinese forces, even though the Chinese received far more assistance from the Soviet Union. In some cases local populations welcomed Japanese troops when they invaded, initially seeing them as preferable to being ruled by Western colonial powers. The Japanese also indoctrinated their soldiers into believing that it was their duty to make Asians "strong again" through force, after being weakened by Western imperialism.

The official translation offered by contemporary leaders was "universal brotherhood", but it was widely acknowledged that that expression meant that the Japanese were "equal to the Caucasians but, to the peoples of Asia, we act as their leader". Hence hakkō ichiu could be seen as a euphemism for Japanese supremacy. In fact, the brutality and the racism of the Japanese led the conquered to view the Japanese imperialists as being equal to or sometimes worse than Western imperialists. For example, the economies of most occupied territories were remanaged only to produce raw war materials for Japan.

=== Allied judgment ===
Hakkō ichiu meant the bringing together of the corners of the world under one ruler, or the making of the world's one family. That was the alleged ideal of the foundation of the empire, and, in its traditional context, meant no more than a universal principle of humanity, which was destined ultimately to pervade the whole universe. The way to the realisation of hakkō ichiu was through the benign rule of the Emperor, and therefore the "way of the Emperor," the "Imperial" or the "Kingly way," was a concept of virtue and a maxim of conduct. Hakkō ichiu was the moral goal, and loyalty to the Emperor was the road that led to it. Throughout the years that followed measures of military aggression were advocated in the names of hakkō ichiu, which eventually became symbols for world domination through military force.

== Aftermath ==
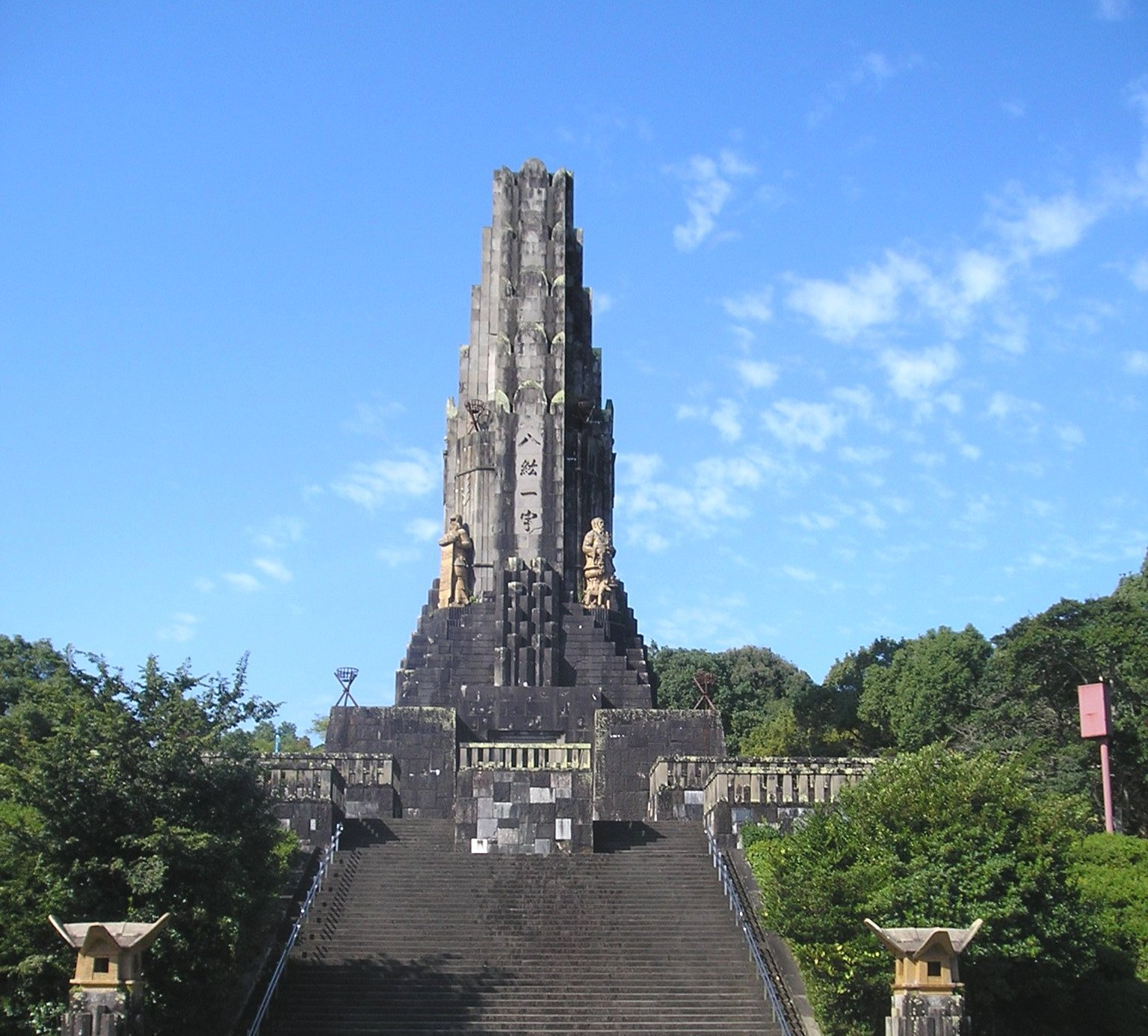
Hakkō ichiu monument (renamed Tower of Peace) in 2010

Since the end of the Pacific War, some have highlighted the hakkō ichiu slogan as part of a context of historical revisionism. The hakkō ichiu monument was renamed Heiwa no tō (平和の塔, Tower of Peace) in 1958 and still stands today. The writing "Hakkō ichiu" was removed from it after the Japanese defeat at the insistence of the U.S. military. The tower was the inception point for the torch relay of the 1964 Summer Olympics. After the Olympics, which coincided with worldwide interest in the Japanese Imperial family, the local tourism association successfully petitioned the Miyazaki Prefecture to restore the "Hakkō ichiu" characters, triggering criticism of militarist connotations carried by the phrase.

== See also ==
- An Investigation of Global Policy with the Yamato Race as Nucleus
- Greater East Asia Conference
- Hokushin-ron
- Japanese militarism
- Japanese nationalism
- Statism in Shōwa Japan
- Lebensraum
- Manifest destiny
- Moscow, third Rome
- Nanshin-ron
- Shinmin no Michi
- Spazio vitale
- Tanaka Memorial
- World domination

== Bibliography ==
- Beasley, William G. (1991). Japanese Imperialism 1894–1945. Oxford: Oxford University. ISBN 978-0-19-822168-5.
- Bix, Herbert P. (2001). Hirohito and the Making of Modern Japan. New York: HarperCollins. ISBN 978-0-06-093130-8.
- Brendon, Piers (2002). The Dark Valley: A Panorama of the 1930s. New York: Vintage. ISBN 978-0-375-70808-4.
- Brownlee, John (1997). Japanese Historians and the National Myths, 1600–1945: The Age of the Gods. Vancouver: University of British Columbia Press. ISBN 0-7748-0645-1.
- Earhart, David C. (2007). Certain Victory: Images of World War II in the Japanese Media. Armonk, New York: M.E. Sharpe. ISBN 978-0-7656-1776-7.
- Edwards, Walter. "Forging Tradition for a Holy War: The Hakkō Ichiu Tower in Miyazaki and Japanese Wartime Ideology." Journal of Japanese Studies 29:2 (2003).
- Morison, Samuel Eliot (1948). History of United States Naval Operations in World War II: The Battle of the Atlantic, September 1939 – May 1943. Oxford: Oxford University Press. 40 editions – [reprinted by University of Illinois Press at Urbana, 2001. ISBN 978-0-252-06973-4].
- Kosei, Ishii (2002). The idea of "co-prosperity Sphere of Greater East Asia" and the Buddhist philosophy - the role of the School of Kyoto. Paris: Inalco. ISBN 2-85831-105-6.
- Shimazu, Naoko (1998). Japan, Race and Equality. Routledge. ISBN 0-415-17207-1.
