= Yokusan Sonendan =

Elite paramilitary wing of the Imperial Aid Association

Yokusan Sonendan badge.

The Yokusan Sonendan (大日本翼賛壮年団, Imperial Rule Assistance Young Men's Corps) was an elite paramilitary youth branch of the Imperial Rule Assistance Association political party of wartime Empire of Japan established in January 1942, and based on the model of the German Sturmabteilung (stormtroopers; SA).

Members received a deep political indoctrination and basic military training. Their responsibilities included forming part of the home guard to assist in matters of civil defense under the direction of official local authorities. They were issued mostly obsolete weapons provided to the organization under orders from their Director-General Kingoro Hashimoto, and were expected to assist local firefighting efforts following air raids, distribute emergency supplies and render basic first aid. The most advanced pupils were earmarked for eventual enrollment in the Imperial Japanese Army Academy, or for a future role as elected local politicians within the Taisei Yokusankai organization.

In addition to its civil defence and paramilitary role, the Yokusan Sonendan was also tasked with assisting local tonarigumi neighborhood civil defense organizations and the Kenpeitai military police by watching for signs of subversives in their area and reporting any anti-war or anti-government activities.

In the last stages of World War II, members received additional military training in the use of anti-tank weapons and light machine guns, for transfer into reserve combat units to support Japan's remaining troops against the expected Allied invasion of the Japanese home islands. The group suffered heavy combat casualties during the Battle of Okinawa. The Yokusan Sonendan was disbanded on 30 May 1945 and its membership merged into the Volunteer Fighting Corps.
