= Imperial Rule Assistance Association =

Empire of Japan's sole political party during much of World War II

- 大政翼贊會; Taisei Yokusankai
- Founder: Fumimaro Konoe
- Leader: Kantarō Suzuki (final)
- Founded: 12 October 1940; 86 years ago
- Dissolved: 13 June 1945; 80 years ago
- Merger of: Rikken Seiyūkai; Rikken Minseitō; Kokumin Dōmei; Shakai Taishūtō
- Groups: Yokusan Sonendan and etc., see #Organisation
- Headquarters: Chiyoda, Tokyo, Japan
- Newspaper: Imperial Rule Assistance
- Ideology: Kokkashugi (Note: Translated in various ways, including "statism", "nationalism", "state-nationalism", and "national socialism".); Totalitarianism; Ultranationalism; Emperor-system fascism
- Political position: Far-right
- Anthem: Taisei Yokusan no Uta
- Status: Purged (under Edict No. 109)

Imperial Rule Assistance Association

Japanese name
- Kana: たいせいよくさんかい
- Kyūjitai: 大政翼贊會
- Shinjitai: 大政翼賛会
Transcriptions
- Revised Hepburn: Taiseiyokusankai

The Imperial Rule Assistance Association (Japanese: 大政翼贊會/大政翼賛会, Hepburn: Taisei Yokusankai), or Imperial Aid Association, was the Empire of Japan's ruling political organization during much of the Second Sino-Japanese War and World War II.

The association was created by Prime Minister Fumimaro Konoe by a merger of the contemporary political parties Rikken Seiyūkai, Rikken Minseitō, Kokumin Dōmei, and Shakai Taishūtō on 12 October 1940. It was formed to promote the goals of his Shintaisei ("New Order") movement. It evolved into a statist, para-fascist ruling political party which aimed at removing sectionalism and factionalism from politics and economics in Japan, creating a totalitarian one-party state in order to maximize the efficiency of Japan's total war effort against China and later the Allies.

When the organization was launched officially, Konoe was hailed as a "political savior" of a nation in chaos; however, internal divisions soon appeared. After the 1942 Japanese general election, all members of Diet were required to join the Imperial Rule Assistance Political Association. The Imperial Rule Assistance Association was formally dissolved on 13 June 1945, around three months before the end of World War II in the Pacific Theater.

== History ==
=== Origin ===
Based on recommendations by the Shōwa Kenkyūkai (Shōwa Research Association), Konoe originally conceived of the Imperial Rule Assistance Association as a reformist political party to overcome the deep-rooted differences and political cliques between bureaucrats, politicians and the military. During the summer of 1937, Konoe appointed 37 members chosen from a broad political spectrum to a preparatory committee which met in Karuizawa, Nagano. The committee included Konoe's political colleagues Fumio Gotō, Count Yoriyasu Arima and entrepreneur and right-wing spokesman Fusanosuke Kuhara. A radical wing of the military was represented by Kingoro Hashimoto, while the traditionalist military wings were represented by Senjūrō Hayashi, Heisuke Yanagawa and Nobuyuki Abe.

Konoe proposed originally that the Imperial Rule Assistance Association be organized along national syndicalist lines, with new members assigned to branches based on occupation, which would then develop channels for mass participation of the common population to "assist with the Imperial Rule". However, from the start, there was no consensus in a common cause, as the leadership council represented all ends of the political spectrum, and in the end, the party was organized along geographic lines, following the existing political sub-divisions. Therefore, all local government leaders at each level of village, town, city and prefectural government automatically received the equivalent position within their local Imperial Rule Assistance Association branch.

In 1938, Konoe passed the State General Mobilization Law, which effectively nationalized strategic industries, the news media, and labor unions, in preparation for total war with China. Labor unions were replaced by the Nation Service Draft Ordinance, which empowered the government to draft civilian workers into critical war industries. Society was mobilized and indoctrinated through the National Spiritual Mobilization Movement, which organized patriotic events and mass rallies, and promoted slogans such as "Yamato-damashii" (Japanese spirit) and "Hakkō ichiu" (All the world under one roof) to support Japanese militarism. This was urged to "restore the spirit and virtues of old Japan".

=== Formation ===
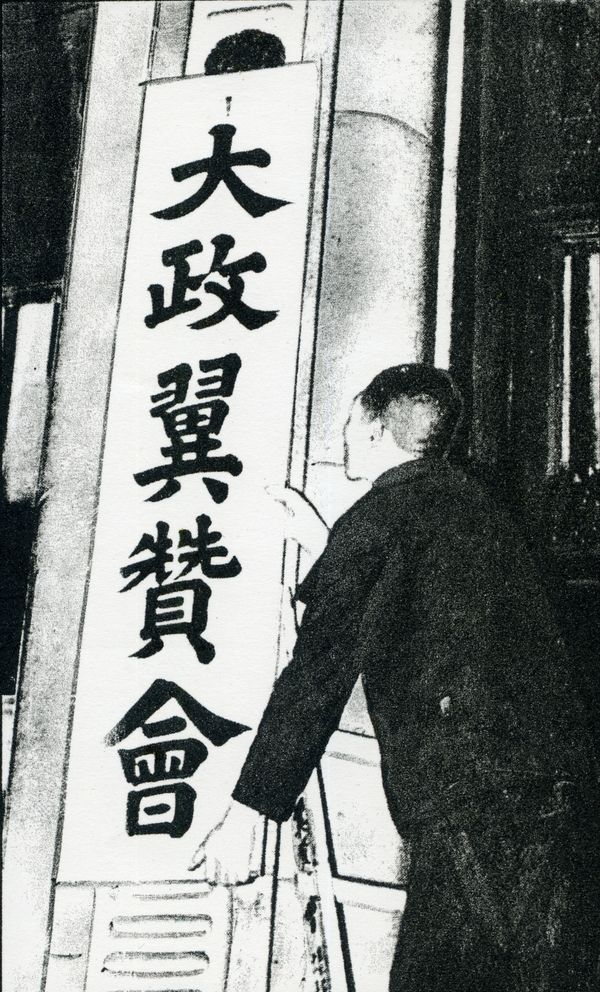
Establishment of the Imperial Rule Assistance Association

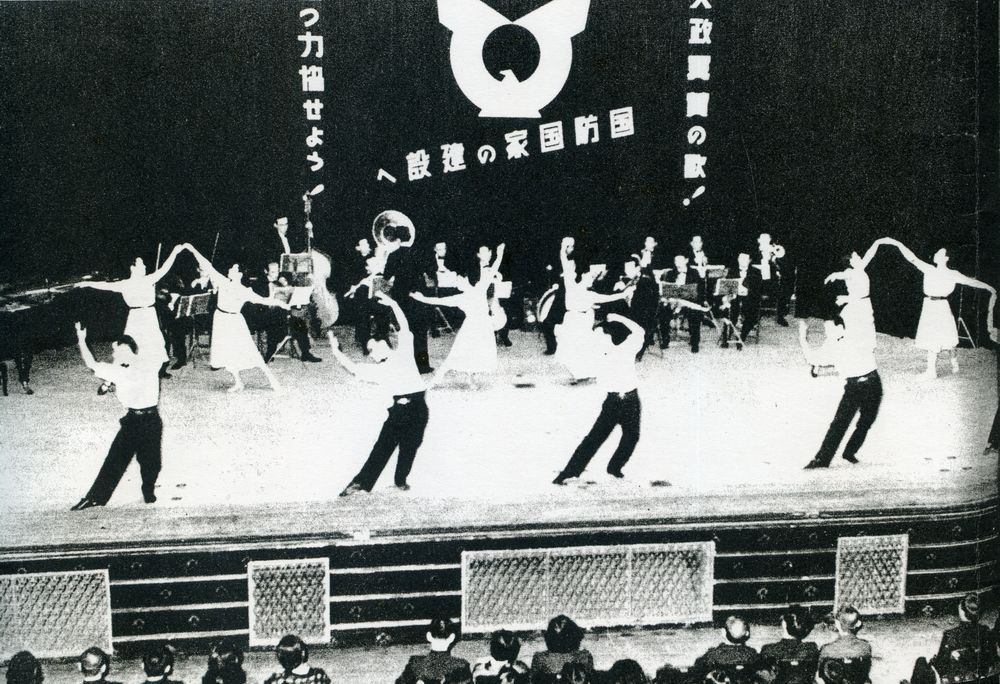
Celebratory performance on founding of the IRAA

In July and August 1940, four contemporary political parties Rikken Seiyūkai, Rikken Minseitō, Kokumin Dōmei, and Shakai Taishūtō voted to dissolve. They subsequently joined the Imperial Rule Assistance Association. The Imperial Rule Assistance Association was formed in October 1940. It was modelled on the mass party model found in Germany with the Nazi Party and Italy's National Fascist Party. Compared to Germany and Italy, Japan got its support from the top and not the bottom as it was created by the government along with Japanese elites. It was formed with the aim of creating a totalitarian one-party state in order to maximize the efficiency of Japan's total war effort against China and later the Allies.

As soon as October 1940, the Imperial Rule Assistance Association systemized and formalized the Tonarigumi, a nationwide system of neighborhood associations. The 6 November 1940 issue of Shashin Shūhō (Photographic Weekly Report) explained the purpose of this infrastructure:

The Taisei Yokusankai movement has already turned on the switch for rebuilding a new Japan and completing a new Great East Asian order which, writ large, is the construction of a new world order. The Taisei Yokusankai is, broadly speaking, the New Order movement which will, in a word, place One Hundred Million into one body under this new organisation that will conduct all of our energies and abilities for the sake of the nation. Aren't we all mentally prepared to be members of this new organization and, as one adult to another, without holding our superiors in awe or being preoccupied with the past, cast aside all private concerns in order to perform public service? Under the Taisei Yokusankai are regional town, village, and tonarigumi; let's convene council meetings and advance the activities of this organization.

In February 1942, all women's associations were merged into the Greater Japan Women's Association which joined the Imperial Rule Assistance Association in May. Every adult woman in Japan, excepting the under twenty and unmarried, was forced to join the Association. Likewise, in June, all youth organizations were merged into the Greater Japan Imperial Rule Assistance Youth Corps (翼賛青年団, Yokusan Sonendan), based on the model of the German Sturmabteilung (stormtroopers).

In March 1942, Prime Minister Hideki Tojo attempted to eliminate the influence of elected politicians by establishing an officially sponsored election nomination commission, which restricted non-government-sanctioned candidates from the ballot. After the 1942 Japanese general election, all members of Diet were required to join the Imperial Rule Assistance Political Association (Yokusan Seijikai), which effectively made Japan a one-party state.

=== Dissolution ===
The Imperial Rule Assistance Association was formally dissolved on 13 June 1945, around three months before the end of World War II in the Pacific Theater. During the Allied occupation of Japan, the American authorities purged thousands of government leaders from public life for having been members of the Association. Later, many of them returned to prominent roles in Japanese politics after the end of the occupation on 28 April 1952 by the Treaty of San Francisco.

== Ideology and activities ==
The Imperial Rule Assistance Association is considered to be a far-right, para-fascist organization. It supported Kokkashugi, which included elements of totalitarianism and ultranationalism. Japanese scholar Masao Maruyama defined the ideology adhered by the group to be "Emperor-system fascism". Encyclopædia Britannica referred to Hideki Tojo as a fascist. While it was founded under the influence of Italian fascism and Nazism based on the New Political Order, many members were drawn from the pre-existing Diet, covered the whole of the left-right political spectrum, and did not adhere to a particular ideology.

The anthem of the association is Taisei Yokusan no Uta (transl. Song of the Imperial Aid Association). They published their own newspaper Imperial Rule Assistance (大政翼賛, Taisei yokusan).

In addition to drumming up support for the ongoing wars in China and in the Pacific, the Imperial Rule Assistance Association helped maintain public order and provided certain public services via the tonarigumi neighborhood association program. It also played a role in increasing productivity, monitoring rationing, and organizing civil defense. The Imperial Rule Assistance Association was also militarized, with its members donning khaki-colored uniforms. In the last period of the conflict, the membership received military training and was projected to integrate with the Volunteer Fighting Corps in case of the anticipated Allied invasion.

Some objections to it came on the grounds that kokutai, imperial polity, already required all imperial subjects to support imperial rule.

== Organisation ==
Multiple groups were established under the association. A parliamentary caucus 翼賛議員同盟, 'Parliamentarian Alliance of Imperial Rule Assistance Association', was first established in September 1941. It was reorganised into the Imperial Rule Assistance Political Association after the 1942 election. In March 1945, parliamentarians that came from the youth wing Yokusan Sonendan formed another caucus 翼壮議員同志会, 'Imperial Rule Assistance Young Men's Parliamentarian Brothers Association'.

Other groups that were part of the association include:

- Great Japan Youth Party
- Dai Nippon fujinkai
- Young Men's Corps
- League of Mobilization in Korea
- Imperial Subject Public Service Association
- Greater Japan Industrial Patriotic Association

== Leadership ==
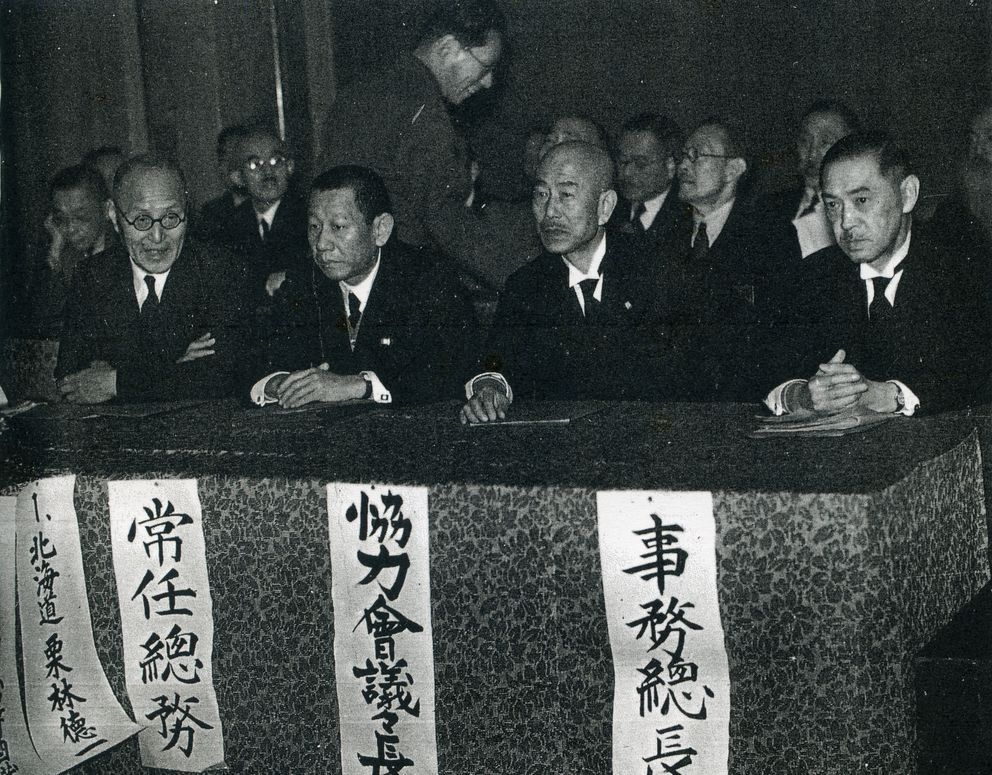
Imperial Rule Assistance Association cadres, 1940

In the history of Imperial Rule Assistance Association there were four leaders:

No.	Portrait	Name (Birth–Death)	Constituency or title	Tenure			Refs.
No.	Portrait	Name (Birth–Death)	Constituency or title	Took office	Left office	Duration	Refs.
1		Fumimaro Konoe (1891–1945)	House of Peers	12 October 1940	18 October 1941	1 year, 6 days	
2		Hideki Tojo (1884–1948)	Military (Army)	18 October 1941	22 July 1944	2 years, 278 days	
3		Kuniaki Koiso (1880–1950)	Military (Army)	22 July 1944	7 April 1945	259 days	
4		Kantarō Suzuki (1868–1948)	Military (Navy)	7 April 1945	13 June 1945	67 days	

Deputy President

Name	Tenure
Heisuke Yanagawa	1941
Kisaburō Andō	1941–43
Fumio Gotō	1943–44
Taketora Ogata	1944–45

General Secretary

Name	Tenure
Yoriyasu Arima	1940–41
Ishiwata Sōtarō	1941
Sukenari Yokoyama	1941–42
Fumio Gotō	1942–43; 1944
Maruyama Tsurukichi	1943–44
Obata Tadayoshi	1944
Kyōshirō Andō	1944–45

== Election results ==
=== House of Representatives ===
Election	Leader	Seats won	Position	Status
1942	Hideki Tojo	381 / 466	1st	Government
