= Jitsuzo Hinago =

Japanese sculptor

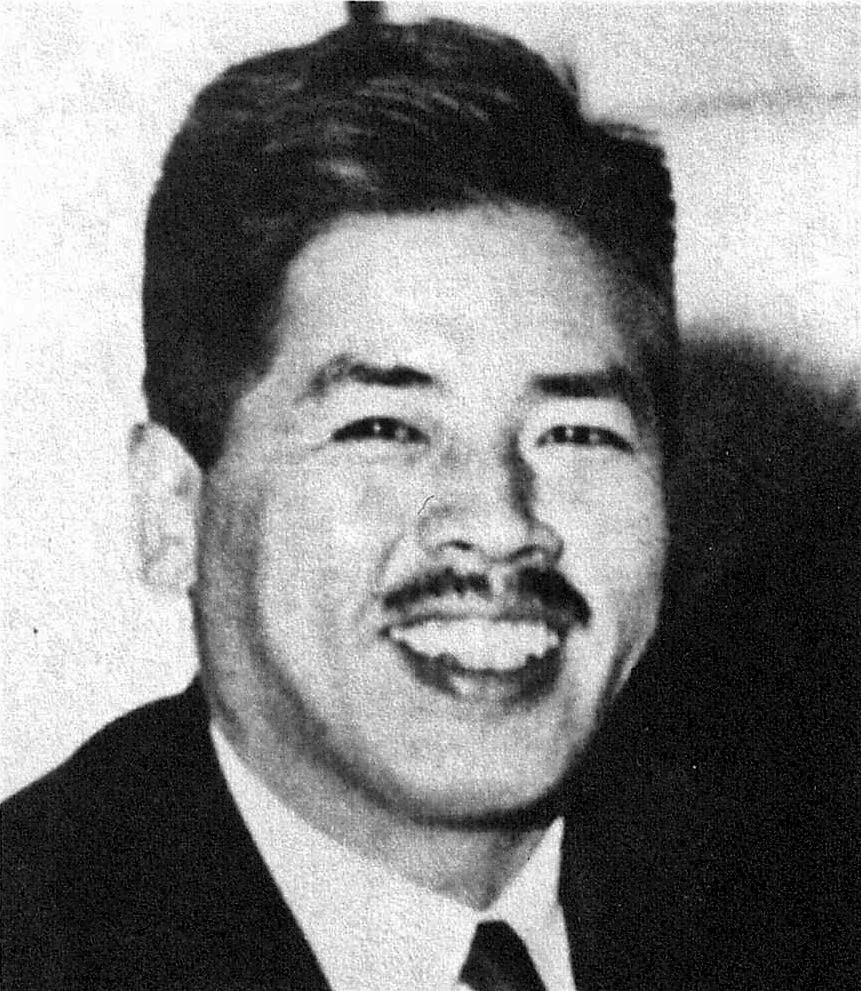
- Born: 24 October 1892; Usuki, Japan
- Died: 25 April 1945 (aged 52); Tokyo, Japan
- Occupation: Sculptor

Jitsuzo Hinago (24 October 1892 – 25 April 1945) was a Japanese sculptor. His work was part of the art competitions at the 1932 Summer Olympics and the 1936 Summer Olympics.
