= 1942 Japanese general election =

- 30 April 1942

All 466 seats in the House of Representatives 234 seats needed for a majority
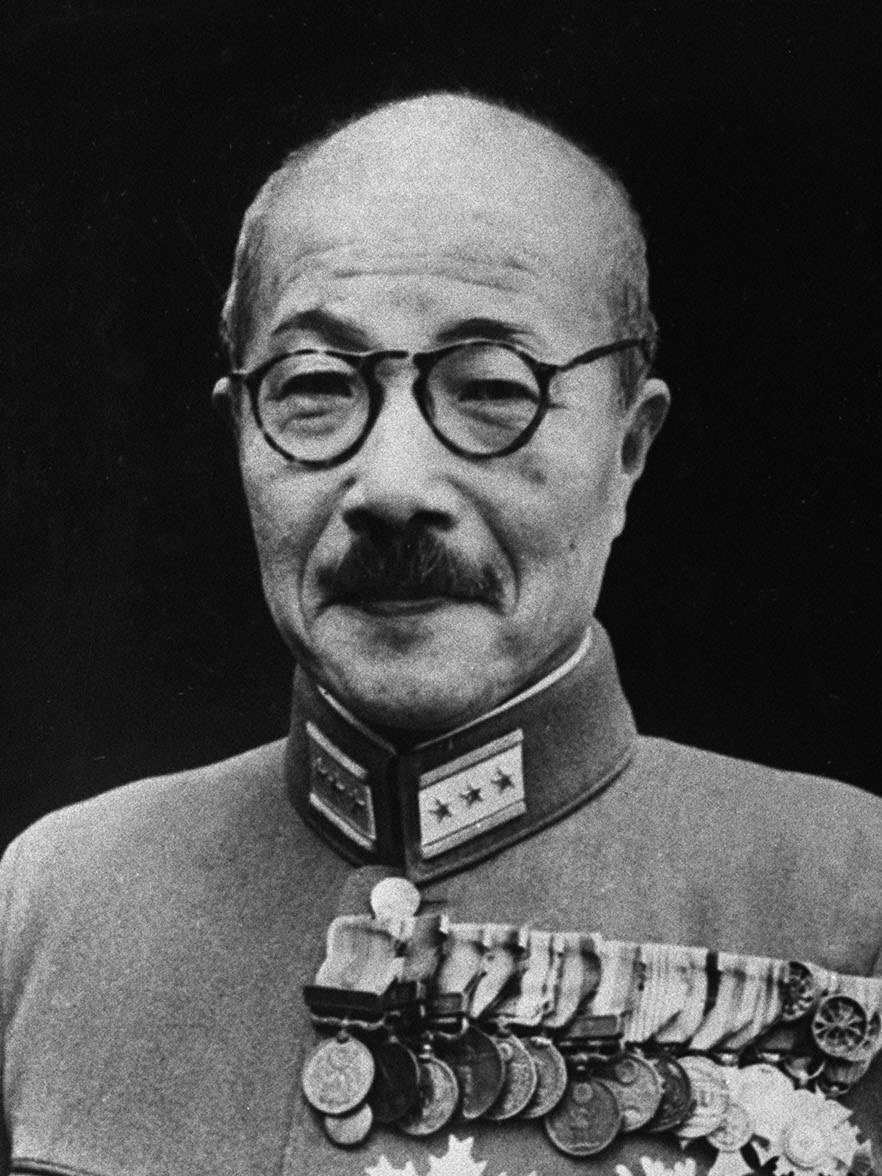

	First party	Second party
Leader	Hideki Tojo	–
Party	Taisei Yokusankai	Not endorsed
Leader since		–
Last election	421
Seats won	381	85
Prime Minister before election
Hideki Tojo
Taisei Yokusankai
Prime Minister after election
Hideki Tojo
Taisei Yokusankai

General elections were held in Japan on 30 April 1942 to elect members of the House of Representatives. They were the only elections held in Japan during World War II. By this time, the House of Representatives had lost much of its power to the military dictatorship, a process that had begun with the "Manchurian Incident" when the Imperial Army invaded Manchuria without approval from the (then still civilian) cabinet in 1931. Since 1932 when Admiral Viscount Saitō Makoto was appointed prime minister of the first so-called "national unity cabinet", fewer members of the political parties in the House of Representatives had held any significant role in government. Additionally, the military had by this point sought to transform Japan into a one-party state.

== Background ==
The government of prime minister Hideki Tojo held the election as a "General Election to Support the Greater East Asia War" at the end of April 1942, just days after the Doolittle Raid on Tokyo.

In 1940, all political parties were forced to merge into the Imperial Rule Assistance Association (Taisei Yokusankai), a pro-military political organization headed by former prime minister Nobuyuki Abe. The likewise fascist Tōhōkai broke away from the Taisei Yokusankai and turned against prime minister Tojo. Among those running against the Taisei Yokusankai, only the Tōhōkai was allowed to run in the election as non-partisans. Among those anti-war and neutral politicians, the comparatively mild politicians also ran as non-partisans. Some "independents" who failed to gain a seat were expelled. After the war, those "independents" and ousted politicians were mainly the ruling class. As communist, left-wing, and anti-war groups had been illegal since 1940, they could not name a candidate in the election. Communists, left-wing politicians and radical anti-military politicians were arrested and not even allowed to run as independents, although anti-war politician Saitō Takao who was expelled from the diet in 1941 was re-elected again.

Notwithstanding the Tojo government's efforts, 613 candidates stood without endorsement while only 466 were endorsed. Several non-endorsed candidates managed to win seats in the election, including Ichiro Hatoyama (who later served as prime minister and was the grandfather of Prime Minister Yukio Hatoyama), Takeo Miki (who later served as prime minister), Kan Abe (the grandfather of Prime Minister Shinzo Abe) and Bukichi Miki. The Tojo Cabinet marked those representatives elected who were not Taisei Yokusankai members as "not endorsed" in the official result. Several of them, such as Hatoyama, were subject to the purge by the Allied authorities following the war although they were not cooperating with the Tojo government.

The turnout of the election was unusually high at 83.1%, partly reflecting the fierceness of the electoral battle.

== Results ==
The government won 381 seats out of the total 466; in some districts, its candidates won uncontested. The Imperial Army had gained a victory in almost every battle as of the election, public support for the war was still quite high, which was the main reason for the landslide victory of the Taisei Yokusankai. Although Japan nominally became a one-party state as a result of the election, the group of Yokusankai-endorsed candidates soon split into numerous factions, some of which became critical of the government as the war dragged on.

Party	Votes	%	Seats
Imperial Rule Assistance Association			381
Not endorsed			85
Total			466
Total votes	12,137,086	–	
Registered voters/turnout	14,594,287	83.16	
Source: Statistics Bureau of Japan

=== By prefecture ===
Prefecture	Total seats	Seats won	
Prefecture	Total seats	IRAA	Not endorsed
Aichi	17	14	3
Akita	7	5	2
Aomori	6	3	3
Chiba	11	9	2
Ehime	9	8	1
Fukui	5	4	1
Fukuoka	18	15	3
Fukushima	11	9	2
Gifu	9	7	2
Gunma	9	9	
Hiroshima	13	9	4
Hokkaido	20	17	3
Hyōgo	19	14	5
Ibaraki	11	9	2
Ishikawa	6	6	
Iwate	7	7	
Kagawa	6	3	3
Kagoshima	12	12	
Kanagawa	11	10	1
Kōchi	6	5	1
Kumamoto	10	10	
Kyoto	11	8	3
Mie	9	5	4
Miyagi	8	6	2
Miyazaki	5	5	
Nagano	13	13	
Nagasaki	9	9	
Nara	5	4	1
Niigata	15	12	3
Ōita	7	7	
Okayama	10	7	3
Okinawa	5	3	2
Osaka	21	17	4
Saga	6	4	2
Saitama	11	11	
Shiga	5	5	
Shimane	6	4	2
Shizuoka	13	10	3
Tochigi	9	8	1
Tokushima	6	5	1
Tokyo	31	21	10
Tottori	4	4	
Toyama	6	5	1
Wakayama	6	5	1
Yamagata	8	6	2
Yamaguchi	9	8	1
Yamanashi	5	4	1
Total	466	381	85
