= Japanization =

Assimilation to Japanese culture

Chinese name
- Traditional Chinese: 皇民化運動
- Simplified Chinese: 皇民化运动
- Literal meaning: movement to make people become subjects of the emperor
Transcriptions
Standard Mandarin
- Hanyu Pinyin: huángmínhuà yùndòng
- Bopomofo: ㄏㄨㄤˊㄇㄧㄣˊㄏㄨㄚˋ ㄩㄣˋㄉㄨㄥˋ
Wu
- Romanization: waonminho yiuindon
Yue: Cantonese
- Jyutping: wong4 man4 faa3 wan6 dung6
Southern Min
- Hokkien POJ: hông-bîn-hòa ūn-tōng

Alternative Chinese name
- Traditional Chinese: 日本化運動
- Simplified Chinese: 日本化运动
- Literal meaning: movement to make something more Japanese
Transcriptions
Standard Mandarin
- Hanyu Pinyin: rìběnhuà yùndòng
- Bopomofo: ㄖˋㄅㄣˇㄏㄨㄚˋ ㄩㄣˋㄉㄨㄥˋ

Korean name
- Hangul: 황민화정책 황민화운동 (alt.)
- Hanja: 皇民化政策 皇民化運動 (alt.)
Transcriptions
- Revised Romanization: hwangminhwa jeongchaek hwangminhwa undong (alt.)
- McCune–Reischauer: hwangminhwa chŏngch'aek hwangminhwa untong (alt.)

Japanese name
- Kanji: 皇民化政策 皇民化運動 (alt.)
- Kana: こうみんかせいさく こうみんかうんどう (alt.)
Transcriptions
- Romanization: kōminka seisaku kōminka undō (alt.)

Japanization or Japanisation is the process by which Japanese culture dominates, assimilates, or influences other cultures. According to The American Heritage Dictionary of the English Language, "To japanize" means "To make or become Japanese in form, idiom, style, or character". Historically, areas occupied by Japan were subject to long-term colonisation and assimilation with a few (i.e., Hokkaido and Ryukyu Islands, Bonin Islands) remaining Japanized post-World War II.

== History ==
During the Heian period (794–1185), Chinese cultural influence began to wane and a more distinct Japanese identity began to form. By this time, the Yamato people had also consolidated control over Honshu by dominating the northern Emishi people. External trade also grew with the establishment of nihonmachi abroad.

By the late 16th century, Japan was politically reunified under the leadership of Oda Nobunaga and his successor, Toyotomi Hideyoshi. For much of the following Edo period (1600–1868), an isolationst diplomacy was practiced, during which Japan did not expand significantly. This increased political and economic stability and standardized laws and customs across the main Japanese islands. Limited regional expansion north did, however, bring Japan into rivalry with Imperial Russia.

After the Meiji Restoration in 1868, the Empire of Japan began to follow the way of western imperialism and expansionism. Victories against Russia and Qing dynasty China saw the focus of expansionism also shift south with the policy of Nanshin-ron ("Southern Expansion Doctrine"). As a result, Japanization began to have a negative meaning because of military conquests and forced introduction of Japanese culture in colonized and conquered areas.

=== Hokkaido ===
Ezo (蝦夷) (also spelled Yezo or Yeso) is the Japanese term historically used to refer to the people and the islands to the northeast of Honshu. This included the northern Japanese island of Hokkaido and sometimes included Sakhalin and the Kuril Islands. The inhabitants of these islands, the Ainu, historically suffered from economic and social discrimination, as both the Japanese government and mainstream population at the time regarded them as primitive and backwards.

The majority of Ainu were assimilated as petty laborers during the Meiji Restoration, which saw the annexation of Hokkaido into the Japanese Empire and the privatization of traditional lands. During the 19th and 20th centuries, the Japanese government also denied the rights of the Ainu to their traditional cultural practices, such as hunting, gathering, and speaking their native language.

=== Okinawa ===
In 1879, Japan officially annexed the Ryūkyū Kingdom, which was a tributary kingdom of both the Qing dynasty and the Empire of Japan. Prior to this time, however, the kingdom, while technically remaining a Chinese vassal state, had been under the long-term influence of the Satsuma Clan since the invasion of 1609.

Though the Ryukyuan languages belong to the Japonic language family, the Japanese language is not intelligible to monolingual speakers of the Ryukyuan languages. The Japanese government regarded the Ryukyuan languages as dialects of Japanese, and began to promote a language "standardization" program. In schools, "standard" Japanese was promoted, and portraits of the Japanese Emperor and Empress were introduced in classrooms. Many high-ranking Japanese military officers went to inspect Okinawan schools to ensure that the Japanization was functioning well in the education system. This measure did not meet expectations in the beginning, partly because many local children's shares of their heavy family labor impeded their presence in schools, and partly because people of the old Okinawan ruling class received a more Chinese-style education and were not interested in learning "standard" Japanese.

To promote assimilation, the Japanese government also discouraged some local customs. Initially the local people resisted these assimilation measures. However, after China was defeated in the First Sino-Japanese War in 1895, people lost confidence in China, and the resistance to Japanization became weaker, though it did not disappear. Men and women began to adopt more Japanese-styled names.

=== Taiwan ===
After the signing of the Treaty of Shimonoseki in April 1895, Taiwan was ceded to the Empire of Japan as a result of the First Sino-Japanese War of 1894–1895. At the start, Taiwan was governed rather like a colony. In 1936, after the arrival of the 17th governor-general, Seizō Kobayashi, there was a change in the Japanese governance in Taiwan. Kobayashi was the first non-civilian governor-general since 1919. He proposed three principles of the new governance: the Kōminka movement (皇民化運動), industrialization, and making Taiwan a base for southward expansion.

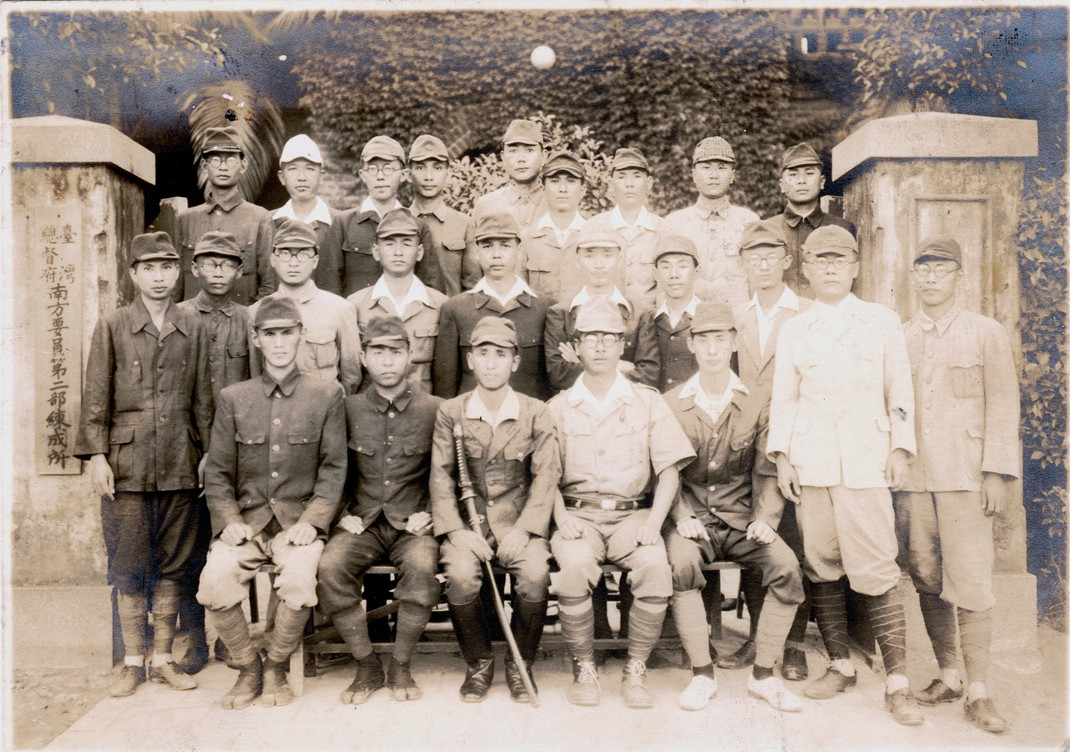
Military officials trainees Taiwan Pacific War

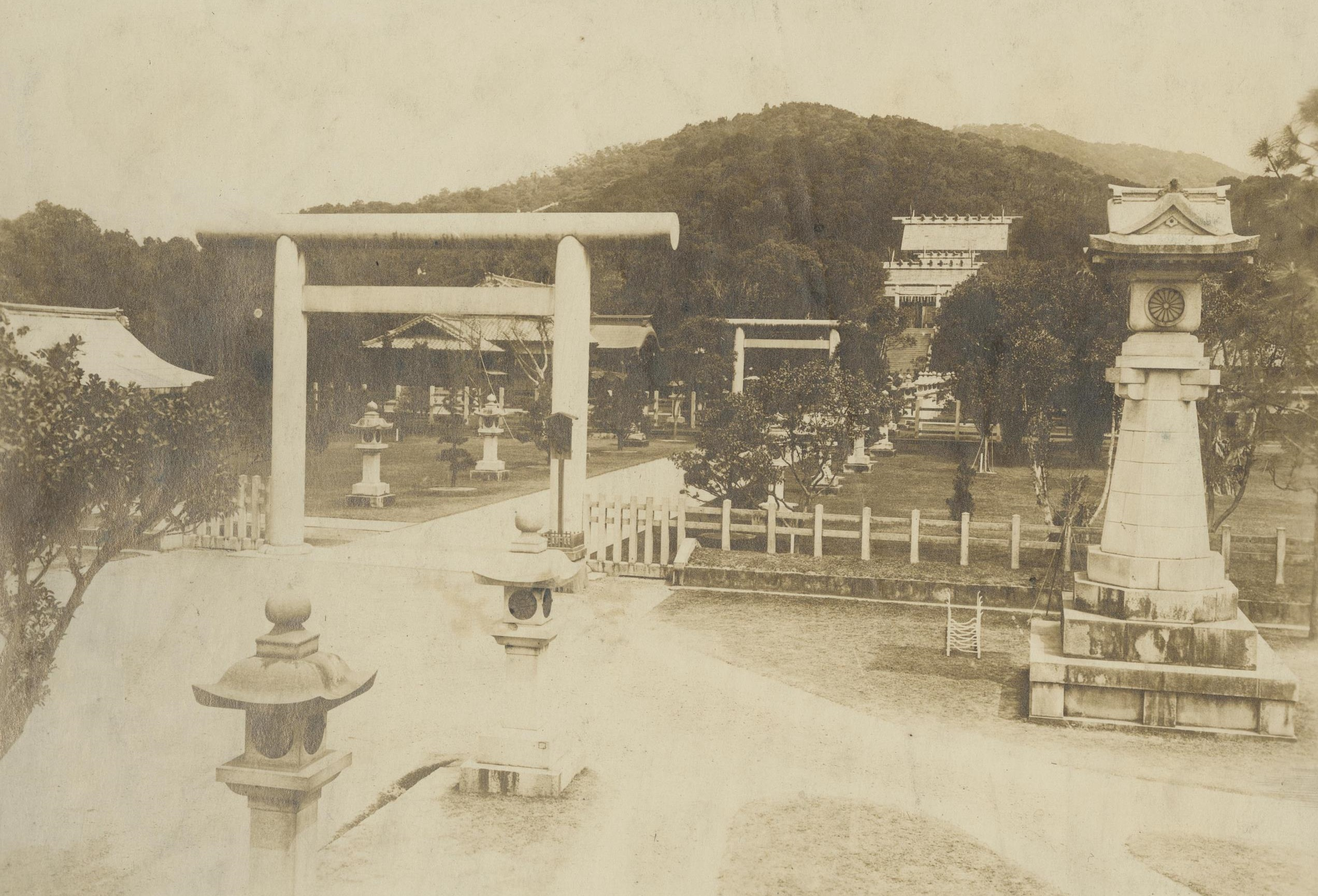
Taiwan Grand Shrine, a Shinto shrine constructed in Taipei in 1901

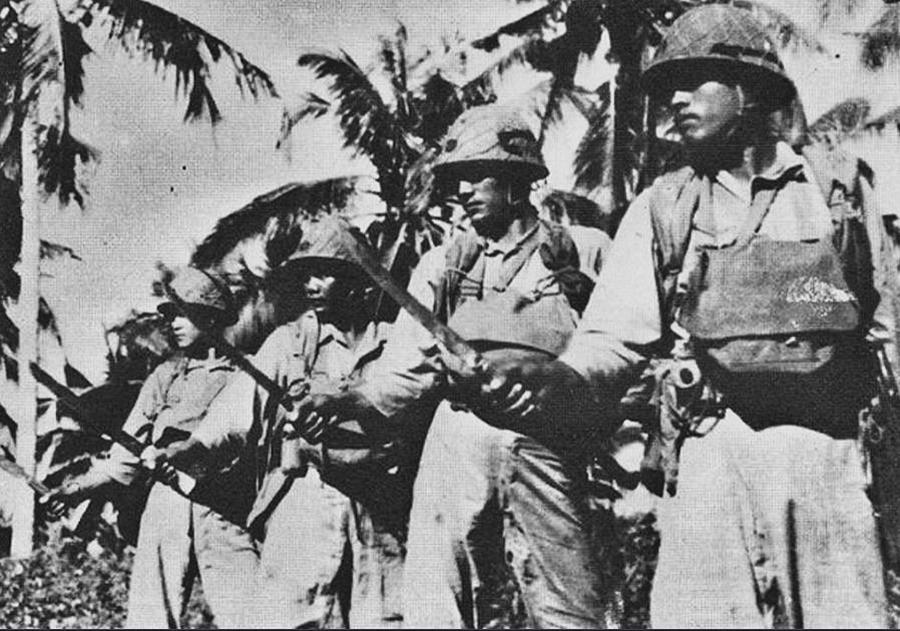
Takasago Volunteers

The Kominka movement (1937 to 1945) can be viewed as a continuation of the ongoing process of assimilation and a crucial part of the Japanese Empire's wartime mobilization, which was not intended to grant constitutional rights to the colonized. “Kominka” literally means "to transform the colonial peoples into imperial subjects". In general, the movement had four major programs. First, the "national language movement" (國語運動, kokugo undō) promoted the Japanese language by teaching Japanese instead of Taiwanese in the schools and by banning the use of Literary Chinese (漢文, kanbun) in the press. The number of "national language speakers" in Taiwan reached 51 percent of the population in 1940. Secondly, the "name changing campaign" (改姓名, kaiseimei) replaced Taiwanese's Han names with Japanese names.The name-changing program in Taiwan was initiated by the colonial government, which aimed to assimilate Taiwanese into Japanese culture and claimed Taiwanese demonstrated imperial loyalty during Japan's war in China, leading many to wish to bear names similar to ethnic Japanese. Thirdly, the "recruitment of military volunteers" (志願兵制度, shiganhei seidō) drafted Taiwanese subjects into the Imperial Japanese Army and encouraged them to die in the service of the emperor. The Imperial Japanese Army recruited Takasago Volunteers from Taiwanese indigenous peoples during the Second World War. Takasagozoku, a positive Japanese name for Formosa, rather than savages by the emperor's direct order. They were encouraged to use Japanese names, pray at shrines, and perform military service. Due to a large number of volunteers, they had to draw lots to determine who would have the honor of joining the Japanese military. Takasagozoku were known for their jungle survival ability and were organized into the Kaoru Special Attack Corps for a suicide mission. Fourthly, the religious reform promoted the Japanese State Shinto and attempted to eradicate traditional indigenous religion, a hybrid of Buddhism, Daoism, and folk beliefs. The number of Japanese shrines in Taiwan increased significantly between 1937 and 1943.

=== Korea ===
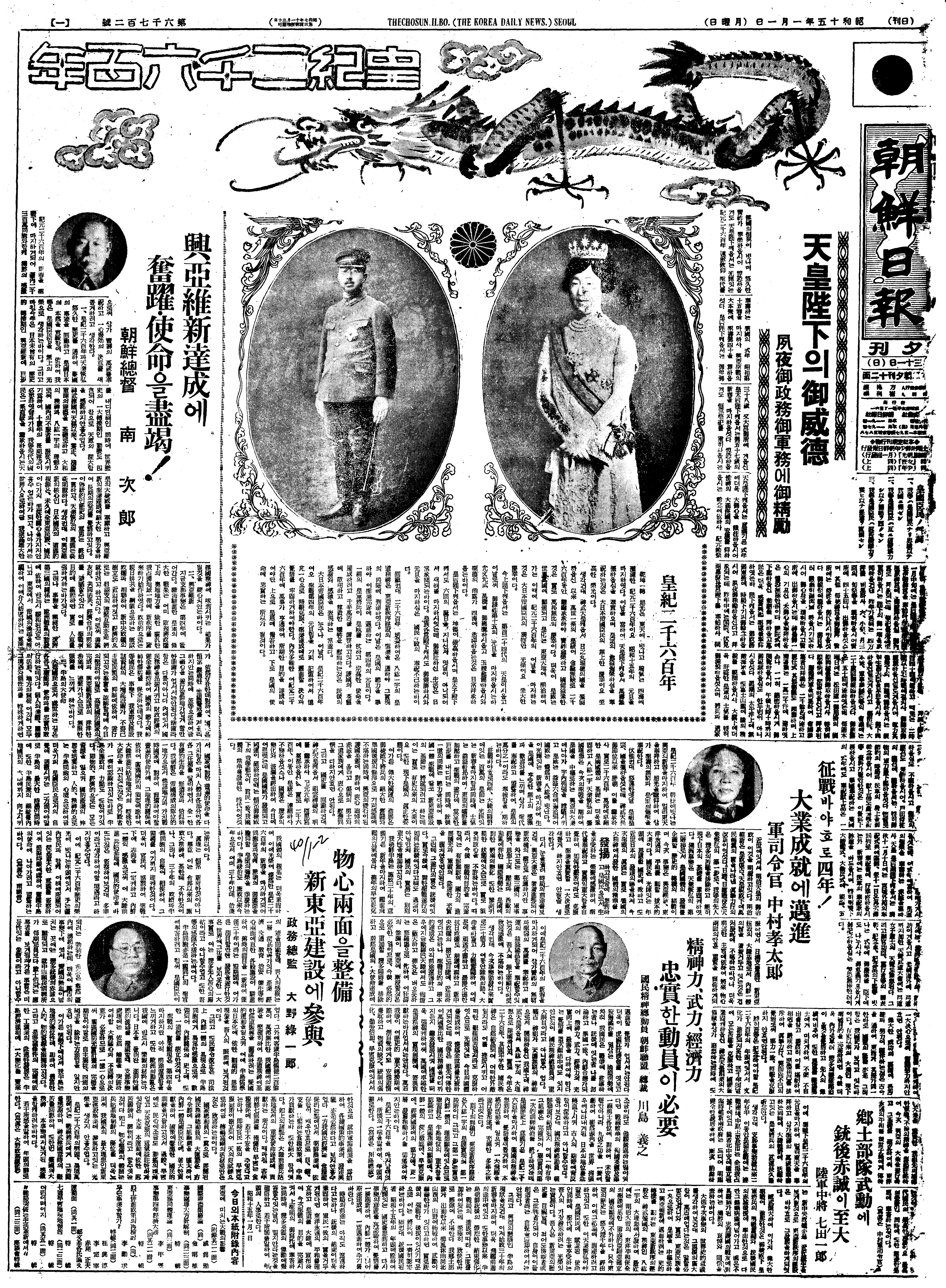
Korean newspaper Chosun Ilbo 1940.1.1

From 1910 to 1945, Korea was incorporated as a part of the Empire of Japan under the name Chōsen (朝鮮), the Japanese reading of Joseon.

The use of the Korean language was banned in schools after 1937 as part of the naisen-ittai program, along with the teaching of Japanese language and culture in schools instead of Korean culture and history. During the Second World War, the use of written Korean in education and publications was also banned.

During this period, Koreans were forced to change their family name to a Japanese one. As part of the repression of Korean culture, the Japanese authorities in Korea forced the Koreans to adopt and use Japanese names and identify as such.

=== Nanyo ===
The South Seas Mandate, formally the Japanese Mandate for the Governance of the South Seas Islands (委任統治地域南洋群島, Inin Tōchi-ryō Nan'yō Guntō), represented the Pacific islands taken from Germany in World War I and administered by Japan from 1914 until 1947. Japanization of the islands occurred as the increasing Japanese settlement in Micronesia saw a shift towards Japanese political, economic, and educational structures. After the war, the area became the Trust Territory of the Pacific Islands.

== Culture ==
=== Sport ===
Baseball was promoted in several Japanese colonies, where local peoples adopted the sport as a way of proving their capabilities against Japan.

== See also ==
- Westernization
