= Yen bloc =

Japanese imperialist policy (1905–1945)

The yen bloc (円ブロック, En burokku) refers to a policy of economic imperialism wherein the yen, the currency of the Empire of Japan, dominated over the economies of its colonies and occupied territories. Initially established in Chōsen, it later spread to Manchukuo, Mengjiang, Japanese-occupied China, and Japanese-occupied Southeast Asia.

In the 1990s, economic scholars hypothesized the potential for a new "yen bloc". However, economic cooperation among East Asian nations has been hindered by lingering distrust of Japan and the legacy of its imperial yen bloc.

== Imperial expansion: 1905–1937 ==
The yen bloc first came to fruition after the First Sino-Japanese War, when Dai-Ichi Bank (which had been established prior to the war, in 1873) took on the responsibilities of a central bank in Joseon. Particular duties held by Dai-Ichi Bank included standardisation of currency and issuance of bank notes. Following the Russo-Japanese War and the establishment of a Japanese protectorate over Korea by the Japan–Korea Treaty of 1905, Dai-Ichi Bank was replaced by the Bank of Korea, with the Korean won being exchanged at par with the Japanese yen. This marked the de facto beginning of the yen bloc.

Following the 1931 Mukden incident and the establishment of Manchukuo, Japan moved to again standardise currency. Prior to the establishment of Japanese control over the region, 15 different types of banknotes were being issued in the region, as well as several different weights of currencies. The Central Bank of Manchou was established, followed by the Manchukuo yuan, which was linked to and exchangeable with the yen at par.

== Pacific War ==
The beginning of the Second Sino-Japanese War in 1937 led to renewed efforts to expand the yen bloc to China in an effort to push out western investment. The North China Economic Development Company was established with the aim of reducing non-Japanese economic penetration in North China, and the Chinese Maritime Customs Service was disrupted in an effort to degrade the credit rating of the Chinese government. The intention of these measures was to sever North China from the rest of the country, so that "North China, like Manchukuo, will form a part of the gold yen bloc and a link in the chain of the currency system by which Imperial economies will be bound," as was stated by a Tokyo-based business journal.

In contrast to North China, Japan made no significant effort to expand the yen bloc to Central China, then under the Reformed Government of the Republic of China. John Hunter Boyle, a historian, wrote that this owed to the unpopularity of Federal Reserve Bank of China notes, which were no longer accepted by the Yokohama Specie Bank. The Nationalist government of China, supported by the United States and the United Kingdom, also began to counteract the yen bloc by taking measures to maintain the independence of the Fa-pi from Japanese control, leading to the Sino-Japanese currency war.

The yen bloc had the unintended effect of dramatically increasing Japan's exports to other bloc members, leading to price decreases. In response, the Japanese government passed a series of measures in autumn 1940 to increase state control over exports and establish further tariffs on the exporting of goods.

During the South-East Asian theatre of World War II, Japan took a more methodical approach to the expansion of the yen bloc, bolstered by experiences in China. Now part of the broader Greater East Asia Co-Prosperity Sphere, the yen bloc included greater emphasis on concepts such as mutual aid.

The yen bloc was reliant on colonial exploitation of its non-Japanese members to function, and led to economic divergence among member states. Members of the bloc were beset by severe inflation, which worsened in regions further from the Japanese archipelago as a result of bloc membership being imposed by force. The GDP per capita of non-Japanese regions within the yen bloc also decreased relative to Japan's own GDP per capita.

== Post-war ==
Since World War II, economic scholars have suggested proposals for a renewed yen bloc, particularly during the 1990s. In January 1993, American economist Jeffrey Frankel noted that there was consensus for the establishment of three large economic blocs: a yen bloc, a dollar zone in the Western Hemisphere, and the European Economic Community. The possibility of a Japanese-led economic bloc, involving other East Asian states, generated concern at the time both within the United States and in nations formerly under Japanese occupation. In 2008, Woosik Moon, a professor at Seoul National University, said that the experiences of the yen bloc during the Pacific War have hindered economic cooperation agreements in modern East Asia.

== See also ==
- Spanish dollar
- Gold bloc
- Sterling area
- Eurozone
