= Trautmann mediation =

Attempt to end 2nd Sino-Japanese War

The Trautmann Mediation (Chinese: 陶德曼調停, Japanese: トラウトマン和平工作) was an attempt by the German Ambassador to China, Oskar Trautmann, to broker a peace between Japanese Prime Minister Fumimaro Konoe and Chiang Kai-shek of the Chinese Nationalist government shortly after the Second Sino-Japanese War began. The mediation began in November 1937 and ended on January 16, 1938, with Konoe announcing its termination.

== Background ==
Since the 1920s, Germany had had a close relationship with the government of the Republic of China, led by the Kuomintang. This Sino-German cooperation intensified throughout the 1930s to rebuild China's industry and armed forces. After the Nazi Party took power, Germany maintained its good relationship with the Chinese government but signed the Anti-Comintern Pact with Japan in November 1936. Germany's expectation for Japan was to be an eastern counterweight against the Soviet Union. For Germany, any armed conflict between China and Japan was very unwelcome.

After August 1937, the Battle of Shanghai had escalated into the full-scale war. China appealed to the international community including League of Nations, to take necessary measures against Japanese aggression.

Japan did not want endless war with China and so made the peace proposal and asked Germany to mediate the peace talks in October 1937. Meanwhile, Chiang reached out to the United States directly, hoping President Franklin D. Roosevelt, who had recently delivered the Quarantine Speech, would mediate Sino-Japanese war and act against Japan.

== First proposal ==
The following is a summary of the first Japanese peace proposal, which was approved by Germany. Trautmann handed this proposal to the Chinese government on November 5, 1937.

1. Autonomy for Inner Mongolia
2. A de-militarized zone between Manchukuo and northern China under Nanking government administration
3. A de-militarized zone in Shanghai with international police
4. The cessation of all anti-Japan policies
5. Cooperation between Japan and China against communism
6. Lower tariffs for Japanese goods
7. Respect foreign nation's properties and rights in China

Japan warned the proposal would be valid for only a limited time. However, Chiang Kai-shek intentionally deferred his government's reply to Tokyo because he expected diplomatic intervention from the Nine Power Treaty Conference in Brussels or military assistance from the Soviet Union."

The Nine Power Treaty Conference began in Brussels on November 3, 1937. Despite China’s desperate appeals, it issued a declaration on November 15 and concluded on November 24 without taking any effective measures against Japan. The League of Nations was similarly paralyzed.

During this diplomatic delay, Japan was gaining the upper hand militarily. Although the Army General Staff imposed an "operation restriction line" following the costly end of the Battle of Shanghai, the operational momentum of the Japanese military broke the chain of command as field officers independently pressed their advance toward the Chinese capital of Nanjing. General Iwane Matsui lost control over the rapid escalation, and ultimately, Iwane Matsui was replaced by Prince Asaka as the Japanese field army independently pressed their attack on the Chinese capital, making any diplomatic peace settlement initiated by Trautmann impossible."

As a result, Ambassador Oskar Trautmann was stripped of his mediating power and was "reduced to only delivering the messages between Nanjing and Tokyo." Realizing the military advantage of the unauthorized field operations, Tokyo's hardliners seized control of the diplomacy. Japan began to press greater demands after military victories, rendering the initial mediation terms obsolete.

By early December, the military situation for China had become hopeless, with the fall of Nanking imminent. Realizing no foreign aid was coming, Chiang Kai-shek finally decided to accept the Japanese proposal as a basis for peace negotiations, communicating this to Trautmann on December 2, 1937.

However, the unauthorized battlefield successes of the field army at Shanghai and Nanjing had drastically altered the political reality in Japan. Emboldened hardliners argued that the original terms had functionally expired due to the delay and were now obsolete given Japan's total victory at the capital.

== Second proposal ==
After lengthy internal discussion, the Konoe cabinet made the second proposal as follows:

1. Diplomatic recognition for Manchukuo
2. Inner Mongolia autonomy
3. Cessation of all anti-Japan and anti-Manchukuo policies
4. Cooperation between Japan, Manchukuo and China against communism
5. War reparations
6. Demilitarized zones in North China and inner Mongolia
7. Trade agreement between Japan, Manchukuo and China

A Japanese diplomat told it to the German ambassador in Japan on December 22, 1937. Japan also set January 5, 1938 as the deadline for a Chinese reply.

However, this new proposal was far beyond what was acceptable for Chiang Kai-shek. He refused it but did not make an official reply.

== Termination ==
On January 11, 1938, six days after the deadline for a Chinese government reply, an Imperial Conference (Gozen Kaigi) was held at Tokyo. Japanese cabinet ministers and military leaders discussed how to handle the Trautmann mediation. The navy did not have a strong opinion because the current war was basically the army's business. The army requested to end the war with more lenient conditions by a diplomatic way, as it faced a much stronger Far Eastern Soviet army at the northern Manchukuo border and wanted to avoid endless attrition warfare. However, Kōki Hirota, the minister of foreign affairs, strongly disagreed with the army. According to him, there was no hope for the Trautmann mediation because of the huge opinion gap between China and Japan.

On January 15, 1938, Japanese primary cabinet members and military leaders had a conference exposing a deep civilian-military divide. The emperor did not attend. There was a heated argument about the continuation of the Trautmann mediation. Hayao Tada, Deputy Chief of Army General Staff, insisted on continuation. Fearing a catastrophic two-front war against both China and the Soviet Union, Tada desperately sought peace to preserve Japan's strength. Tada "placed his last hope on the Trautmann mediation," but he was ultimately defeated by the civilian hardliners. Konoe, Hirota, Navy Minister Mitsumasa Yonai and War Minister Hajime Sugiyama disagreed with him. During the argument, "Foreign Minister Hirota Kōki arrogantly confronted General Tada," forcing him to concede. Finally, Tada reluctantly agreed with Konoe and Hirota. That same day, Konoe reported the cabinet's conclusion, termination of Trautmann's mediation, to the emperor.

The next day, January 16, 1938, Konoe announced the First Konoe Statement, stating: "The Japanese government will not negotiate with the Chiang Kai-shek government anymore." The Trautmann mediation was terminated, and this fatal diplomatic shift trapped Japan into a total war it could not win, cementing the trajectory for the broader Pacific War.

== Sources ==
Tetsuya Kataoka, Resistance and Revolution in China: The Communists and the Second United Front,1974, University of California Press
