= Konoe statements =

1938 statements by Fumimaro Konoe cabinets

The Konoe statements (Japanese: 近衛声明) refer to three diplomatic statements made by Fumimaro Konoe's cabinets in the early stages of the Second Sino-Japan war, aimed at establishing a new order in East Asia together with China. The Japanese archives during the period of the invasion of China explicitly record and categorise these three Konoe's declarations:

- First Konoe statement: Following the seize of Nanjing in December 1937, the Japanese government issued a statement in January 1938, declaring that it would no longer negotiate with the Nationalist government, which is known as the first Konoe statement.
- Second Konoe statement: Following the seize of Guangzhou and Wuhan in October 1938, the Japanese government issued another statement, proposing the concept of "building a new order in East Asia", which is known as the second Konoe statement.
- Third Konoe statement: After Wang Jingwei left Chongqing, the wartime capital of China, the Japanese government published the summary of Japan's demands on China, which is known as the third Konoe statement.

The declarations were not accepted by the Nationalist government in Chongqing, and led to the establishment of Wang Jingwei regime in China. The United States (US), the United Kingdom (UK) and France regarded the declarations a violation to the Nine-Power Treaty and refused to admit Wang regime as the legitimate government of China.

== Background ==
=== Trautmann mediation ===
After the outbreak of the Marco Polo Bridge incident in 1937, Japan initially planned to further occupy Shanghai after taking control of North China, aiming to force the Nationalist government to capitulate, cease fighting, and enter negotiations. During the Brussels Conference in November, Japan proposed peace talks to the Nationalist government through Nazi Germany, but Chiang Kai-shek demanded a return to the situation before the Marco Polo Bridge Incident and thus refused the peace talk request. At the Brussels Conference, the UK, France, and the US adopted a policy of appeasement towards Japan, while Germany and Japan pressured the Nationalist Government, indicating that the war would lead to the disintegration of the Chinese government. On December 2, Chiang Kai-shek held a meeting with senior military officers in Nanjing, and subsequently expressed to the German Ambassador to China, Oskar Trautmann, a willingness to accept German mediation.

=== Fall of Nanjing ===
While the Trautmann mediation proceeded, the Japanese army continued its advance towards Nanjing, hoping that its occupation would force the Nationalist government to surrender. On December 13, the Japanese army captured Nanjing, which was followed by the Nanjing massacre. After capturing Nanjing, Japan increased the prerequisite conditions for peace talks. On December 14, Japanese Prime Minister Fumimaro Konoe issued a public statement, noting that Chiang Kai-shek had lost Beiping, Tianjin, Shanghai, and Nanjing, and stated that Japan would negotiate with a new regime that would replace Chiang Kai-shek. A joint meeting of civilian officials and the military was then convened to discuss the terms of peace with China, including demands that China recognise Manchukuo and allow Japan to establish pro-Japanese governments in North China and Inner Mongolia. These demands were conveyed to the Nationalist government through the German Ambassador to China, Oskar Trautmann. On December 21, the Japanese cabinet added four conditions to the peace talks, including that the Chinese government cease its opposition to Japan and Manchukuo, collaborate with Japan and Manchukuo against communism, establish demilitarized zones and special regimes in necessary areas of China, sign a close economic cooperation agreement with Japan and Manchukuo, and pay reparations demanded by Japan.

=== Soviet aids ===
After the Nationalist government lost Nanjing, Japan believed that Chiang Kai-shek's government was on the verge of collapse. However, for the Nationalist Government, the loss of Nanjing was not an absolute disaster. The defence of Nanjing aimed to provide retreating troops with an opportunity to regroup and to draw Japanese forces deeper into China's interior. Meanwhile, relations between China and the Soviet Union grew increasingly close, with a significant number of Soviet planes and pilots arriving in China. By the end of 1937, there were already 450 Soviet pilots participating in the war in China. After the fall of Nanjing, Chiang Kai-shek telegraphed Joseph Stalin, requesting the Soviet Union to enter the war, but Stalin pointed out that Soviet participation would lead to international sympathy for Japan and therefore refused Chiang Kai-shek's request. Other countries, wary of deteriorating relations with Japan, were unwilling to provide assistance. Until Germany's invasion of the Soviet Union in 1941, a total of 904 airplanes, 1,516 trucks, 1,140 cannons, 9,720 machine guns, 50,000 rifles, and 31,600 bombs were provided to China.

== First Konoe statement ==
After the capture of Nanjing, the Japanese government's high-ranking officials were divided on how to handle the war in China. The Deputy Chief of Staff of the Army, Hayao Tada, believed that negotiations with China should continue, but the majority of the cabinet members, including the Minister of Foreign Affairs and the Ministers of Army and Navy, disagreed. Following the fall of Nanjing, the Nationalist government still did not accept the conditions proposed by Japan. The lack of progress in the Trautmann mediation had a significant impact on Japan, which demonstrated a trend towards the prolongation of the war against China, with Japan clearly in a reactive position in controlling the progress of the war. The Japanese government faced several choices:

1. Expanding the scope of the war to force China into submission, which would lead to further depletion of Japan's military and economic resources.
2. Establishing an alternative regime in China as a bridge for reconciliation, thus bypassing the Nationalist government for negotiations.
3. Engaging in indirect or direct peace negotiations with the Nationalist Government, despite the failure of previous attempts, but still possibly seeking new opportunities for negotiation.

However, the massacre in Nanjing did not lead to the submission of the Chinese government and its people. On January 2, Chiang Kai-shek wrote in his diary, "The conditions proposed by Japan are equivalent to the conquest and extinction of our country. Rather than submitting and perishing, it is better to perish in defeat," thus choosing to refuse negotiations and continue the resistance against Japan. On January 11, 1938, Japan held an Imperial Conference attended by Prime Minister Fumimaro Konoe, Army Chief of Staff Prince Kan'in, Navy Minister Admiral Fushimi, and others to adjust its policy towards China. Citing the Nationalist Government's delay and lack of sincerity, the Japanese government decided to stop the Trautmann mediation. At the Imperial Conference, the Japanese government determined that China would adopt a long-term resistance strategy, hence decided on a dual strategy:

- If the Nationalist government did not seek peace, Japan would no longer consider it as a viable negotiation party. Instead, Japan would support emerging regimes hoping to resolve issues through incidents, adjust relations with them, and aim to eliminate or incorporate the existing central government.
- If the Nationalist government sought reconciliation, it would be required to cease its resistance against Japan, cooperate with Japan against communism, and achieve economic cooperation, including officially recognizing Manchukuo, allowing Japanese troops in Inner Mongolia, North China, Central China, and co-governing Shanghai.

On January 13, 1938, the Chinese Minister of Foreign Affairs, Wang Chonghui, expressed to Germany that further understanding of the nature and content of the additional conditions for peace talks proposed by Japan was needed to make a decision. January 15 was the deadline set by Japan for China to accept the conditions for peace talks, but China did not respond. Based on the decisions of the Imperial Conference, the Japanese government issued a statement on January 16, declaring that it would no longer regard the Nationalist government as a counterpart in the negotiation, looking forward to the establishment of a new Chinese regime that sincerely cooperated with Japan, and to adjust the relations between the two countries. This is known as the first Konoe statement, through which the Japanese government actively ended Trautmann's mediation attempt.

== Second Konoe statement ==
In December 1937, the Japanese military established the Provisional Government of the Republic of China, a puppet government in Beiping. In March 1938, the Reorganised National Government of the Republic of China was established in Nanjing.

In May 1938, Fumimaro Konoe reorganized the cabinet, appointing Kazushige Ugaki as Foreign Minister and Shigeaki Ikeda as Finance Minister. At the end of May, Chinese Foreign Minister Zhang Qun sent a congratulatory telegram to his old acquaintance Kazushige Ugaki and proposed exploratory peace talks, indicating that he and Wang Jingwei were open to negotiations. On June 23, the representative of H. H. Kung, his secretary Qiao Fusan, went to Hong Kong to meet with Japanese Consul Tomoichi Nakamura, expressing that Chiang Kai-shek internally wished for peace but could not publicly state this due to his position, and suggested that the UK and the US should mediate. On June 27, the British Under-Secretary of State for Foreign Affairs, Rab Butler, made a speech in the House of Commons, stating that the UK was willing to mediate between China and Japan if both sides agreed.

On July 8, Japan cabinet meeting passed a resolution, demanding that upon the surrender of the current Chinese government, it should be integrated into a new emerging Chinese regime, similar to the statement made in January. This added negotiation conditions that the Chinese government must be reorganised and renamed, merged into or replaced by a new National Government, and that Chiang Kai-shek must step down. On July 15, Qiao Fusan held a secret meeting with Chiang Kai-shek and H. H. Kung in Wuhan and on July 18 proposed Chiang Kai-shek's conditions for peace talks, including China's cessation of anti-Japanese activities, signing a tripartite treaty between Japan, Manchukuo, and China indirectly recognizing Manchukuo's independence, recognizing Inner Mongolia's autonomy, not recognizing North China's autonomy but agreeing to joint development, discussing a demilitarized zone upon Japan's specific request, considering joining an anti-communist pact, and stating the Chinese government's inability to pay war reparations. H. H. Kung indicated to Japan that Chiang Kai-shek was prepared to abandon Wuhan and hoped to implement peace talks before its fall, as it would be difficult to negotiate afterwards.

In October 1938, Japanese forces captured Wuhan and Guangzhou. To facilitate negotiations with the Nationalist government in Chongqing, the second Konoe statement was issued, indicating that if the Nationalist government was willing to abandon its anti-Japanese policy and participate in the establishment of a new order in East Asia, the Japanese government would not refuse to negotiate, softening the stance taken in the first Konoe statement. The declaration stated that the goal of the Sino-Japanese War was to "establish a new order that guarantees the long-term stability of East Asia," introducing the concept of a new order in East Asia for the first time. This new order challenged the then-existing Five-Power Treaty, referred to as the "old order," while calling for cooperation among Japan, Manchukuo, and China.

== Third Konoe statement ==
After the first Konoe statement, Army personnel including Sadaaki Kagesa and Takeo Imai took the initiative to approach Wang Jingwei for peace negotiations. Following the second Konoe statement, Japan continued peace talks, mainly in Shanghai. The Chinese representatives were Gao Zongwu and Mei Siping, while the Japanese were represented by Sadaaki Kagesa, Takeo Imai, and others. On November 20, both parties reached an agreement, which covered "good-neighbourliness and friendship, joint defence against communism, and economic cooperation," and reported it to the Japanese government and Wang Jingwei. This agreement was the practical implementation of the second Konoe statement. Subsequently, in an Imperial Conference on November 30, the Japanese government decided on "The Guidelines for Adjusting the New Relationship between Japan and China," making it a national policy. This guideline contained three principles, also known as the Konoe Three Principles:

- The principle of good-neighbourliness and friendship,
- The principle of joint defence,
- The principle of economic cooperation.

On December 20, Wang Jingwei responded to the second Konoe statement by breaking away from the Chongqing government and arriving in Hanoi. On December 22, the Konoe cabinet issued the third Konoe statement, clarifying that Japan's deployment of troops had no intention of occupying Chinese territory or demanding China to pay for military expenses. Japan only requested China to share the responsibility of constructing a new order in East Asia and guaranteed its actions towards constructing this new order. The declaration also stated that Japan would respect Chinese sovereignty and independence, consider abolishing consular jurisdiction, and return foreign concessions in China.

On December 26, 1938, Chiang Kai-shek made a speech during the Kuomintang's Memorial Week, criticizing the third Konoe statement. He analyzed the three principles of the Konoe statement and compared them with the previously proposed Hirota's three principles, pointing out that the Konoe principles were more aggressively imperialistic. Chiang Kai-shek argued that the third Konoe statement not only showed Japan's shift from continental to maritime expansion but also marked a shift from a northward to a southward expansion policy, indicating that Japan's aggressive plans targeted not only China but also aimed to disrupt the international order, dominate East Asia, and exclude European and American powers. He emphasised that Japan had made its long-hidden ambitions and plans public.

== Reactions ==
=== Japan ===
In February 1940, the declarations was criticized by Saitō Takao, a member of Imperial Diet, who frankly pointed out that the declarations were hypocritical, as the Japanese intention to exterminate the Chinese government contradicted with the Japanese claim of building a friendly neighbourly relationship with China. While the Japanese government claimed that Japan had no intention to monoplize the Chinese market, Saitō doubted that Japan was waging a war of which its policy goals made no sense and demand to know what the New Order in Asia exactly was. After his speech in the Diet, he was expelled from the Diet.

=== China ===
On December 29, 1938, Wang Jingwei sent a telegram from Hanoi to Chiang Kai-shek, the Chairman of Kuomintang, and the members of the Central Executive Committee, expressing support for Konoe's third declaration and calling on the Nationalist government to communicate sincerely with the Japanese government based on the "Konoe Three Principles" to restore peace. This telegram, later known as the "Yan Telegram," marked Wang Jingwei's public shift towards Japan. On December 31, the telegram was published in the "South China Daily" in Hong Kong under the name of the Central News Agency. Meanwhile, Chiang Kai-shek's speech on December 26 sharply criticised the Konoe statement, creating a stark contrast between the two. On January 1, 1939, Kuomintang expelled Wang Jingwei from the party and relieved him of all his duties, stating that Wang's actions violated party discipline, endangered the state, and were unacceptable to the people of the nation. This move clearly indicated China's rejection of the "Konoe Three Principles."

In June 1939, Japan decided to support Wang Jingwei in establishing a "New Central Government of China," requiring him to accept the "Konoe Three Principles." In July, Wang Jingwei broadcast from Shanghai, supporting these principles, which Japan considered the beginning of peace efforts. In November, Japan and Wang Jingwei held confidential talks in Shanghai to confirm and refine the "Konoe Three Principles," resulting in the "Wang-Japan Secret Agreement." In March 1940, the puppet Nationalist government was established, issuing the "Declaration of the Return of the Capital to Nanjing" and the "Political Outline of the National Government," officially accepting the "Konoe Three Principles." In November, the "Basic Treaty of Relations between Japan and China" was signed, and the "Japan-Manchukuo-China Joint Declaration" was issued, cementing the "Konoe Three Principles" as part of Japan's policy of aggression against China.

=== US and UK ===
Following the first Konoe statement, Japanese Foreign Minister Kazushige Ugaki directed negotiations with the ambassadors of Britain and the US in Japan concerning their interests in China. By the end of September, due to disagreements with the hardline Minister of the Army, Seishiro Itagaki, Ugaki resigned, and Fumimaro Konoe took over as Foreign Minister. This development gave the British Ambassador to Japan, Sir Robert Craigie, new hope for negotiations with Japan. He suggested that the British Foreign Office seek conditional cooperation with Japan to resolve frictions between the two sides. In October, the US protested against Japan's monopolistic actions in China and its violation of the "Open Door" policy, changing the dynamics of British-Japanese negotiations. The British Foreign Office believed it prudent to observe the impact of the US' actions and avoid making too many concessions in negotiations with Japan, so as not to weaken the American stance.

The second Konoe statement reflected Japan's attempt to establish an exclusive market, especially its efforts to bring China under its control, which contravened the "Open Door" principle of the Nine-Power Treaty. The UK paid close attention to this, and given that the US had already protested to Japan about the "Open Door," Ambassador Craigie believed that the UK had an opportunity to follow the US's lead in discussions. On November 1, Neville Chamberlain stated in the House of Commons that Japan alone could not satisfy China's post-war capital needs, and the UK could participate, prompting the Chinese Ambassador to the UK, Guo Taiqi, to submit a note to the British Foreign Office on November 7, accusing the UK of assisting Japan in violation of the Nine-Power Treaty. On November 4, the US announced its adherence to the Nine-Power Treaty, and on November 9, Under-Secretary of the Foreign Office, Rab Butler, reiterated in the House of Commons the UK's adherence to the treaty, stating the UK would assist the Chinese government and people in rebuilding, not Japan.

On January 14, 1939, the UK submitted a diplomatic note to Japan, stating that the UK adhered to the "Open Door" policy and would not accept Japan's attempt to establish an economic bloc including China, would not accept unilateral changes to the status of the Nine-Power Treaty, and would not recognize facts established by Japan through force. On January 25, British Foreign Secretary Lord Halifax told the Japanese Ambassador to the UK, Shigeru Yoshida, that Japan's actions in China were "undeniably aggressive" and the UK could not possibly sacrifice Chinese interests for a compromise with Japan. The US and France also submitted diplomatic notes, indicating they would not recognise the "New Order in East Asia." In July 1939, the US abrogated the US-Japan Treaty of Commerce and Navigation, and in November, amended the Neutrality Act, lifting the arms embargo on belligerent nations. In March 1940, the US announced it would not recognize the Wang Jingwei regime.

== See also ==
- Greater East Asia Co-Prosperity Sphere
- New Order (Nazism)
