= Tekigai-sō =

Former residence of Fumimaro Konoe

- 荻外荘
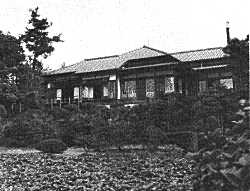

- Location within Tokyo Location within Japan

General information
- Architectural style: sukiya-zukuri
- Location: Suginami, Tokyo, Japan
- Coordinates: 35°41′58″N 139°38′11″E
- Completed: 1927
- Renovated: 1960

Technical details
- Material: wooden
- Floor count: 2
- Floor area: 400 m^{2}

Design and construction
- Architect: Itō Chūta

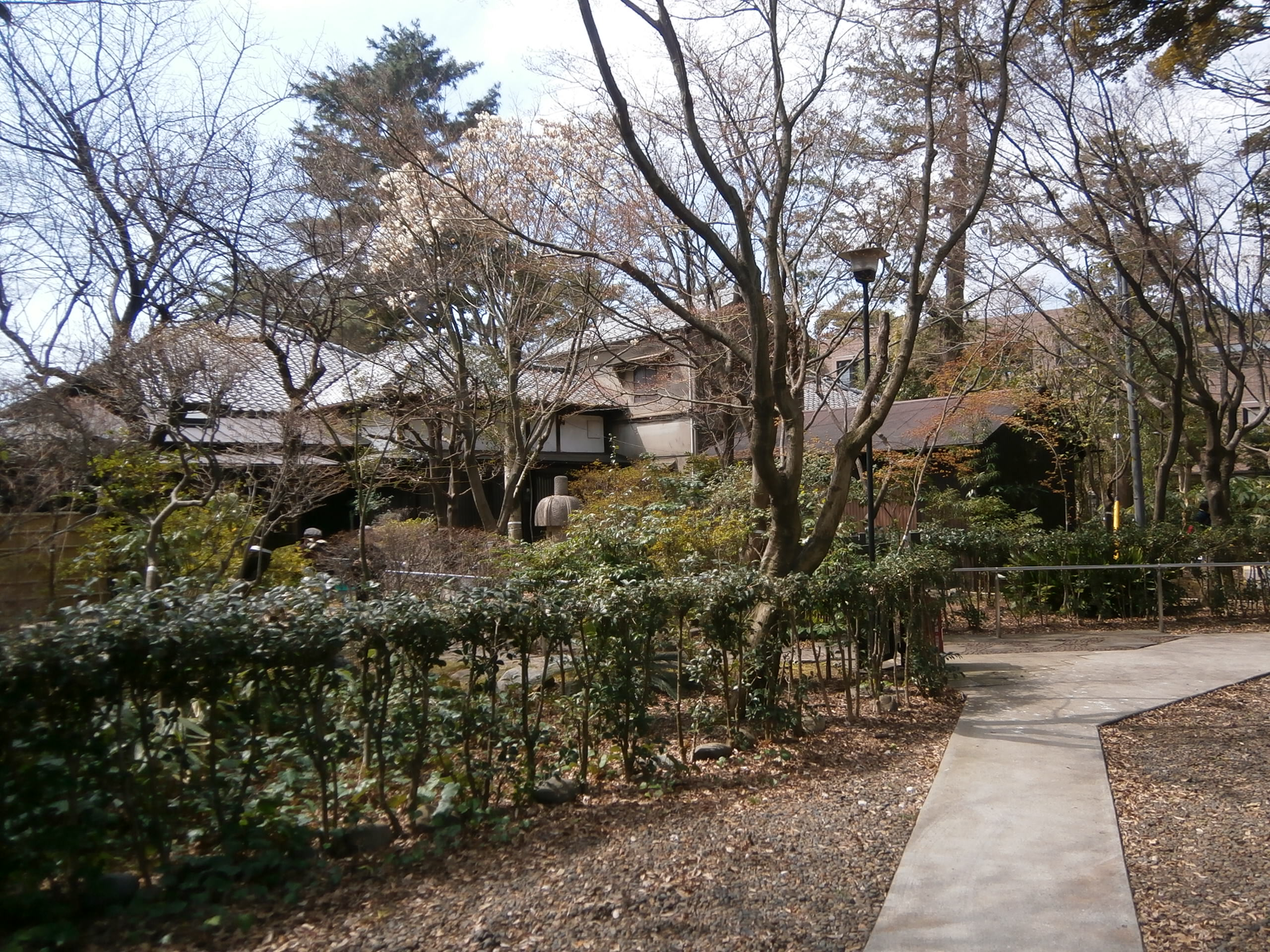
Tekigai-sō

The Tekigai-sō (荻外荘) was the residence of pre-war Japanese Prime Minister Fumimaro Konoe, located in the Ogikubo neighborhood of Suginami, Tokyo, Japan. The building and surrounding gardens were designated a National Historic Site of Japan in 2016.

== Overview ==
The Tekigai-sō is a one-story wooden structure designed by the noted architect Itō Chūta for Tatsukichi Irisawa, a doctor with the Imperial Household Agency in 1927. Located on a hill with a slope to the south, the villa had a view over the Zenpukuji River to Mount Fuji in the distance. Although in the very traditional sukiya-zukuri style, the design incorporated high ceilings, as Irisawa preferred western-style interior with chairs, and had several exotic design details reflecting Ito's travels in China, India and the Middle East. The building was purchased by Konoe in 1937, who remodeled the interior into a more traditional Japanese style. Konoe also added to the structure and constructed a separate kura warehouse. The villa was given the name of "Tekigai-sō" by Prince Kinmochi Saionji. When purchased by Konoe, the villa was surrounded by 6000 square meters of gardens, and Ogikubo itself was still a semi-rural area.

Konoe lived in Mejiro in downtown Tokyo and initially intended to use the Tekigai-sō as a villa, but he found its location and quiet surroundings much to his liking, and this villa became the de facto prime minister's residence. A number of important events in the pre-war and wartime history of Japan occurred at this location. It was at the Tekigai-sō that the "Ogikubo Conference" was held between Konoe, Hideki Tōjō and Yosuke Matsuoka in July 1940 to discuss closer ties between Japan, Nazi Germany and Fascist Italy. This resulted later in the signing of the Tripartite Pact. It was also at the Tekigai-sō that Konoe announced the formation of the Imperial Rule Assistance Association in October 1940 with Yoriyasu Arima. It is also the location of the "Tekigai-sō Meeting" between Konoe, Tōjō, Admiral Koshirō Oikawa, and Foreign Minister Teijirō Toyoda, during which Tōjō refused to make any concessions regarding a negotiated settlement of the Second Sino-Japanese War, leading to Konoe's resignation as prime minister without any resolution to the growing crisis in US-Japan relations.

Konoe returned to the Tekigai-sō after his resignation from his third term as prime minister in October 1941, and continued to work behind-the-scenes in opposition to the Pacific War and to overthrow the Tōjō government in 1944. However, after the surrender of Japan, Konoe was accused of war crimes by the American occupation authorities and committed suicide by taking potassium cyanide poison in the study of the Tekigai-sō in December 1945 rather than face public trial.

After Konoe's death, Shigeru Yoshida rented the property from the Konoe family and used it as his private residence for a time.

Approximately half of the structure, consisting of the entrance building and guest room, which was the venue for many political talks, were relocated to Toshima, Tokyo in 1960, where they were reconstructed in the grounds of an office of the Tenrikyō religious organization. The Konoe family renovated the remaining portion as a residence. They continued to reside in the building until it was purchased by the Suginami government in 2014. The current building area of Tekigai-sō is approximately 400 square meters and the grounds were open to the public as a park in March 2015, but the interior of the building itself is not open to the public except on certain rare occasions. An agreement was reached with Tenrikyō to return the half of the structure that was relocated to Toshima in 2016, and this structure was dismantled in 2018 and is pending reconstruction.

== See also ==
- List of Historic Sites of Japan (Tōkyō)
