= After the Banquet =

1960 novel by Yukio Mishima

- First edition cover
- Author: Yukio Mishima
- Original title: 宴のあと; Utage no Ato
- Language: Japanese
- Publication date: 1960

After the Banquet (宴のあと, Utage no Ato) is a 1960 novel by Yukio Mishima.

== Plot ==
It follows Kazu, a middle-age proprietress of an upscale Japanese restaurant that caters to politicians. She meets a semi-retired ambassador, Noguchi, grows to like him, and eventually marries him. From there the novel explores the conflicts that rise up between the two, as the tensions between the political world, Kazu's formerly well-ordered life, and Noguchi's integrity flare up. It is written in a distinctly Japanese style, dwelling on the minutiae of clothing and food in great detail.

== Publication ==
It was first published in 1960 under the Japanese title Utage no Ato. The New Yorker called it "the biggest and most profound thing Mishima has done so far in an already distinguished career" upon its translation into English by Donald Keene in 1963. In a retrospective review in 2016, Iain Moloney of The Japan Times remarked that "it seems odd that a book as innocuous as After the Banquet could have had such an impact."

The politician Hachiro Arita sued Mishima, claiming its publication violated his privacy. The Tokyo District Court found in favor of Arita in 1964, Japan's first judicial recognition of the right to privacy. The case became very famous due to its celebrity litigants and the groundbreaking decision; it was named the "After the Banquet case" (「宴のあと」裁判, Utage no Ato Saiban).

== Editions ==
- Mishima, Yukio. Utage no Ato. 1961, Tokyo. (OCLC: 27755892)
- Mishima, Yukio. After the Banquet. 1999, New York. (ISBN 0375705155)
