= Hachirō Arita =

Japanese diplomat and politician (1884–1965)

- 有田 八郎
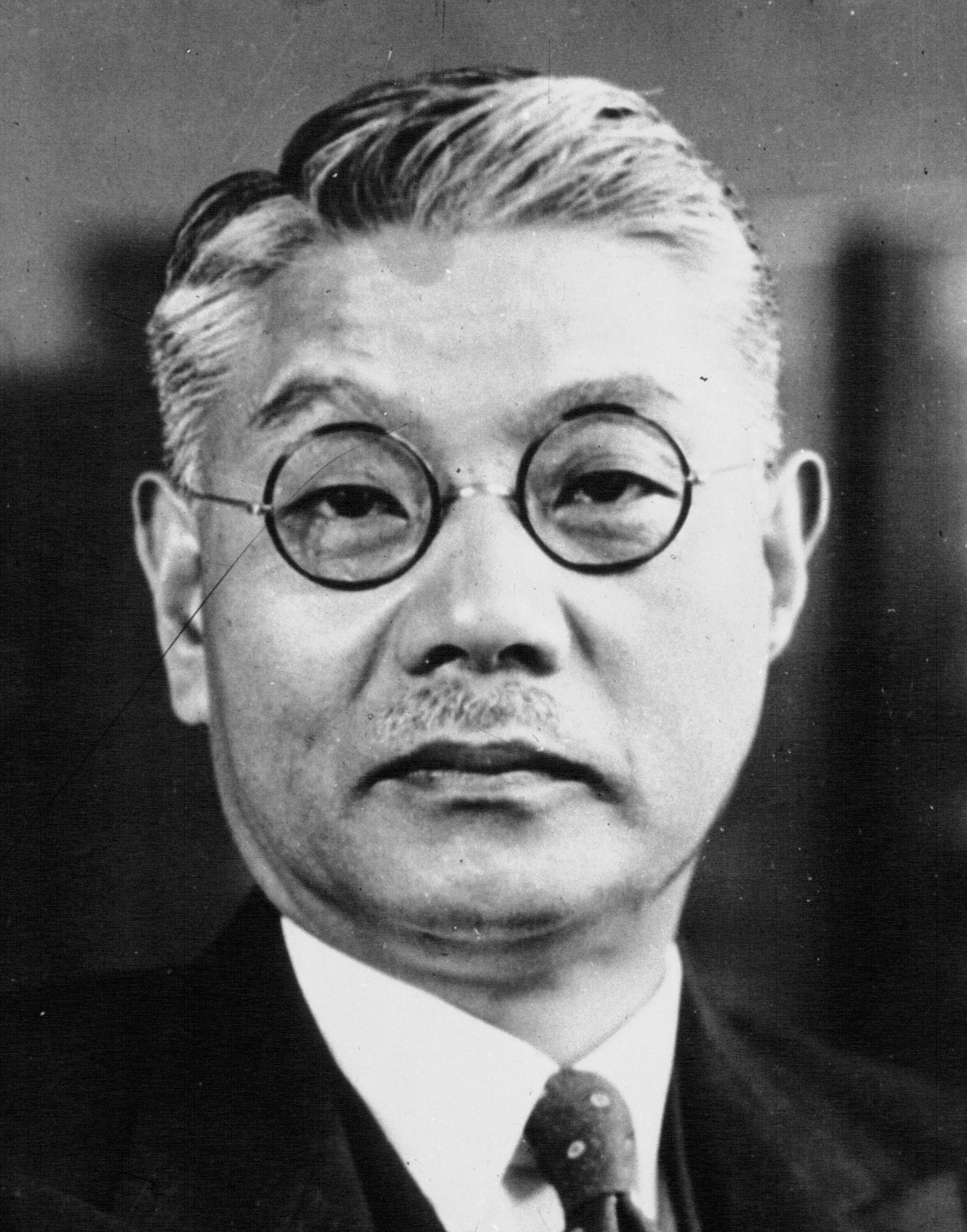
- Arita in 1936

Minister for Foreign Affairs
- In office 16 January 1940 – 22 July 1940
- Prime Minister: Mitsumasa Yonai
- Preceded by: Kichisaburō Nomura
- Succeeded by: Yōsuke Matsuoka
- In office 29 October 1938 – 30 August 1939
- Prime Minister: Fumimaro Konoe; Kiichirō Hiranuma
- Preceded by: Kazushige Ugaki
- Succeeded by: Nobuyuki Abe
- In office 2 April 1936 – 2 February 1937
- Prime Minister: Kōki Hirota
- Preceded by: Kōki Hirota
- Succeeded by: Senjūrō Hayashi

Member of the House of Representatives
- In office 13 April 1953 – 27 February 1955
- Preceded by: Hideichi Ōshima
- Succeeded by: Hideichi Ōshima
- Constituency: Niigata 1st

Member of the House of Peers
- In office 10 February 1938 – 16 February 1946 Nominated by the Emperor

Personal details
- Born: 21 September 1884 Sado, Niigata, Japan
- Died: 4 March 1965 (aged 80) Tokyo, Japan
- Party: Socialist (1955–1965)
- Education: Tokyo Imperial University

Hachirō Arita (有田 八郎, Arita Hachirō; 21 September 1884 – 4 March 1965) was a Japanese politician and diplomat who served as the Minister for Foreign Affairs for three terms. He coined the term Greater East Asia Co-Prosperity Sphere, which provided an official agenda for Imperial Japan's expansionism.

After the war, Arita was active as a leftist politician. The circumstances surrounding his second marriage and his unsuccessful 1959 run for Governor of Tokyo served as the model for the novel After the Banquet by Yukio Mishima. This led to a famous court case in which Arita successfully sued for invasion of privacy.

== Biography ==
Arita was born on the island of Sado in Niigata Prefecture. He joined the Ministry of Foreign Affairs after graduation in 1909 from the Law School of Tokyo Imperial University, and established himself as an expert on Asian affairs. Arita was on the Japanese delegation to the Versailles Peace Treaty Conference of 1919, and in his early career also was stationed at the Japanese consulates in Mukden and in Honolulu. He served as Japanese ambassador to Austria in 1930. He returned to Japan to briefly serve as Vice Foreign Minister in 1932, but returned to Europe in 1933 as Japanese ambassador to Belgium.

Arita became Foreign Minister under the cabinet of Prime Minister Kōki Hirota from 1936 to 1937. He returned to that post under the administrations of Fumimaro Konoe and Kiichirō Hiranuma from 1938 to 1939 and again under Mitsumasa Yonai in 1940. He was also a appointed member of the House of Peers in the Diet of Japan from 1938.

Arita was an opponent of the Tripartite Pact, and continually pushed for better relations with the United States. However, with the increasing power and influence of the military in Japanese politics, he was repeatedly forced to make compromises. From 1938 to 1940, he and Konoe worked together to create the Greater East Asia Co-Prosperity Sphere, which deliberately outlined vague objectives for propaganda purposes. Arita emphasized on the economic aspects, at the behest of Yōsuke Matsuoka, whilst Konoe emphasized on pan-Asian unity.

=== Post-war politics ===
After the surrender of Japan, Arita was purged from public office by the occupation. When the purge was lifted he became active as a leftist politician and successfully ran for a seat in the House of Representatives in the 1953 election. In the same year, the widowed Arita married Terui Azegami, the proprietress of an upscale ryotei in Shirokanedai.

Inejirō Asanuma supporting Arita, candidate in the Tokyo gubernatorial election, 22 April 1959.

Arita ran for the office of Governor of Tokyo as a candidate of the Japan Socialist Party in 1955 and again in 1959, but lost both elections. During the 1959 election his wife closed and mortgaged her restaurant to raise campaign funds. After the defeat the couple was saddled with debt. Terui decided to raise money for reopening her restaurant with the help of conservative figures such as Shigeru Yoshida and Eisaku Sato. This caused a dispute between husband and wife and they divorced the same year.

=== After the Banquet case ===
The relationship between Arita and Terui, and the circumstances of the 1959 election served as the model for the novel Utage no ato (宴のあと, After the Banquet) by Yukio Mishima. After its publication in 1960, Arita sued Mishima for invasion of privacy. The Tokyo District Court ruled in favor of Arita in September 1964, marking the first time the right to privacy had been recognized by a Japanese court.

Arita served as an advisor to the Socialist Party until he died of pneumonia on 4 March 1965, at the age of 80. His grave is at the Tama Cemetery in Fuchū, Tokyo.

Political offices
Preceded by Kōki Hirota	Japanese Minister for Foreign Affairs; 1936–1937	Succeeded by Senjūrō Hayashi
Preceded by Kazushige Ugaki	Japanese Minister for Foreign Affairs; 1938–1939	Succeeded by Nobuyuki Abe
Preceded by Kichisaburō Nomura	Japanese Minister for Foreign Affairs; 1940	Succeeded by Yōsuke Matsuoka
