= Oskar Trautmann =

German diplomat and writer (1877–1950)

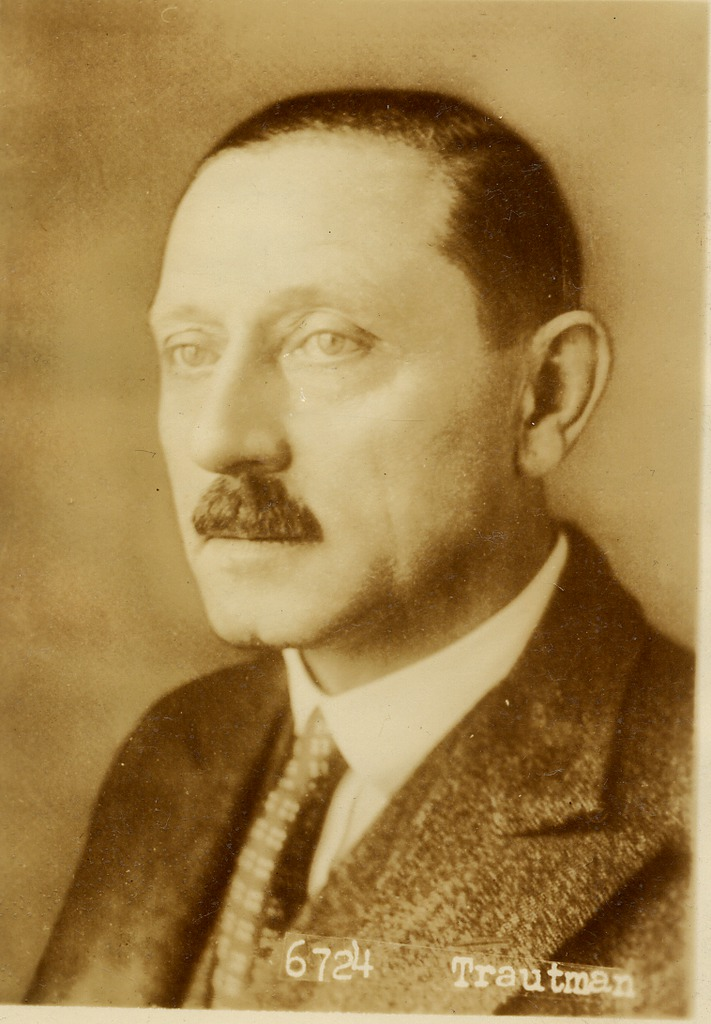
- Born: May 7, 1877; Stradow, Oberspreewald-Lausitz, Brandenburg(?) German Empire
- Died: December 10, 1950 (aged 73)

Oskar Trautmann (7 May 1877 – 10 December 1950) was a German diplomat and writer.

== Diplomatic career ==
After completing his doctorate in 1904, Trautmann embarked on a consular career. Trautmann entered the German Ministry of Foreign Affairs, in 1905 he was appointed Vice Consul in St. Petersburg, Russia. In 1907 he served as Secretary of the German delegation to the Hague Peace Conference. In 1911 he left his position in St. Petersburg and joined the manpower division of the Ministry of Foreign Affairs. In 1913 was appointed Consul General in Zürich, Switzerland. After the First World War, he filled positions that were related to the Far East. In 1921 he was appointed Consul General in Kobe, Japan, and in 1922 he was appointed Councillor of the Embassy in Tokyo.

Between 1935 and 1938 he served as Ambassador to China, serving in Nanjing, where he attempted to mediate the 2nd Sino-Japanese War.

== Early life ==
Trutamann was born on the 7th of May, 1877, to the small village of Stradow, Brandenburg. He first attended Erwin-Strittmatter-Gymnasium in Spremburg, then to the secondary school Friedrich-Wilhelm-Gymnasium, where he passed his school leaving examination in 1895. He studied law studies in Berlin, initially was interested in various subjects of legal history and legal philosophy before becoming interested about constitutional and international law, something that would later lead to his career. He was fascinated by "the East German mixture of Germanic and Slavic cultures," and even as a young man he learned the Russian language, "because it was so close to Wendish."

== Interest in Chinese cultural art ==
Trautmann was also a well-known Chinese painting and bronze collector within his time as Ministry of Foreign Affairs, collecting around 150 paintings and calligraphic works. He collected various contemporary art, meeting important Chinese artists at the time, such as Xu Beihong, Qi Baishi, and Zhang Daqian. Trautmann took his painting collection back to Germany, and included them in various exhibitions he organized.

== Works ==
- Trautmann, Oskar, Der Diplomat - Der Konsul (Berlin: Lehrmittelzentralt d. DAF. 1938)
- "Russia and the Great War 1914-1917" The XX Century (journal published in Shanghai)
- Mitter, Rana. Forgotten Ally: China's World War II, 1937-1945. 2013.

== Sources ==
- Brief biography at the Bundesarchiv (German)
- Brief art biography, from The Sothebys (English)

Diplomatic posts
Preceded by Herbert von Borch	German Ambassador to China; 1931–1938	Succeeded by Recognition transferred to the Nanjing regime Heinrich Georg Stahmer (1941)
