= Fumimaro Konoe =

Prime Minister of Japan (1937–1939; 1940–1941)

Prince Fumimaro Konoe
- 近衞 文麿
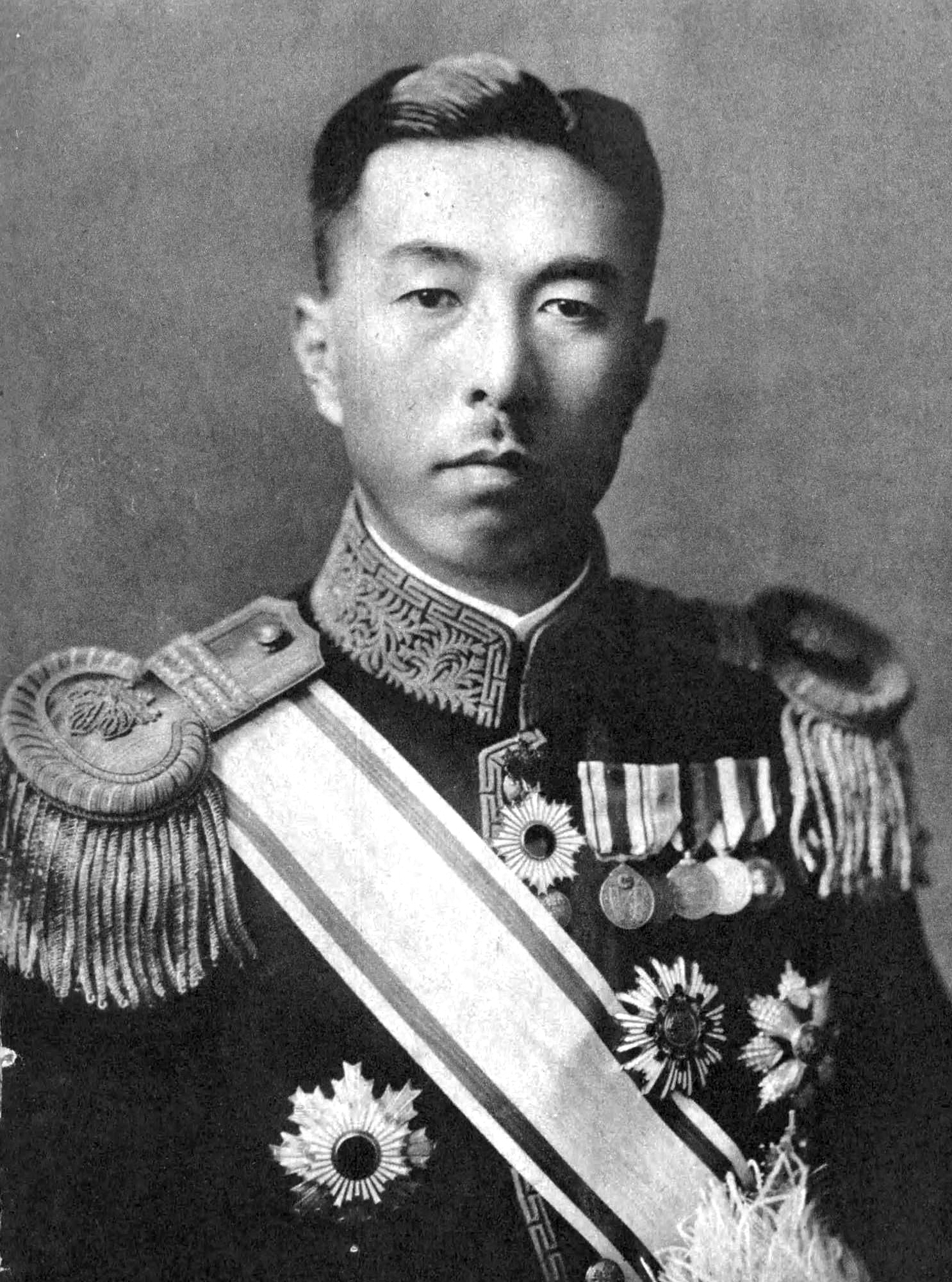
- Konoe in 1938

Prime Minister of Japan
- In office 22 July 1940 – 18 October 1941
- Monarch: Hirohito
- Preceded by: Mitsumasa Yonai
- Succeeded by: Hideki Tojo
- In office 4 June 1937 – 5 January 1939
- Monarch: Hirohito
- Preceded by: Senjūrō Hayashi
- Succeeded by: Hiranuma Kiichirō

President of the Imperial Rule Assistance Association
- In office 12 October 1940 – 18 October 1941
- Vice President: Heisuke Yanagawa
- Preceded by: Position established
- Succeeded by: Hideki Tojo
Ministerial offices
Minister of Justice
Acting; 18 July 1941 – 25 July 1941
Prime Minister	Himself
Preceded by	Heisuke Yanagawa
Succeeded by	Michiyo Iwamura
Minister of Agriculture
Acting; 22 July 1940 – 24 July 1940
Prime Minister	Himself
Preceded by	Toshio Shimada
Succeeded by	Tadaatsu Ishiguro
Minister for Foreign Affairs
Acting; 30 September 1938 – 29 October 1938
Prime Minister	Himself
Preceded by	Kazushige Ugaki
Succeeded by	Hachirō Arita
Minister of Colonial Affairs
Acting; 30 September 1938 – 29 October 1938
Prime Minister	Himself
Preceded by	Kazushige Ugaki
Succeeded by	Yoshiaki Hatta

President of the Privy Council
- In office 5 January 1939 – 24 June 1940
- Monarch: Hirohito
- Vice President: Yoshimichi Hara
- Preceded by: Hiranuma Kiichirō
- Succeeded by: Yoshimichi Hara

President of the House of Peers
- In office 9 June 1933 – 7 June 1937
- Monarch: Hirohito
- Vice President: Yorinaga Matsudaira
- Preceded by: Tokugawa Iesato
- Succeeded by: Yorinaga Matsudaira

Vice President of the House of Peers
- In office 16 January 1931 – 9 June 1933
- President: Tokugawa Iesato
- Preceded by: Hachisuka Masaaki
- Succeeded by: Yorinaga Matsudaira

Member of the House of Peers
- In office 12 October 1916 – 16 December 1945 Hereditary peerage

Personal details
- Born: 12 October 1891 Tokyo City, Japan
- Died: 16 December 1945 (aged 54) Tekigai-sō, Tokyo, Japan
- Cause of death: Suicide by cyanide poisoning
- Party: Imperial Rule Assistance Association (1940–1945)
- Other political affiliations: Independent (before 1940)
- Spouse: Chiyoko Konoe (1896–1980)
- Parent: Konoe Atsumaro (father)
- Relatives: Konoe family
- Education: First Higher School; Tokyo Imperial University; Kyoto Imperial University

Japanese name
- Kanji: 近衞 文麿
Transcriptions
- Romanization: Konoe Fumimaro

Prince Fumimaro Konoe (近衞 文麿, Konoe Fumimaro; 12 October 1891 – 16 December 1945) was a Japanese politician who served as Prime Minister of Japan from 1937 to 1939 and from 1940 to 1941. He presided over the Japanese invasion of China in 1937 and breakdown in relations with the United States which eventually culminated in the Second World War's expansion to the Asia-Pacific theater. Konoe also played a central role in transforming Japan into a totalitarian state by pushing through the State General Mobilization Law and establishing the Imperial Rule Assistance Association.

Born in Tokyo to a prominent aristocratic family, Konoe graduated from Kyoto University and took up his father's seat in the House of Peers in 1916. He was a member of the Japanese delegation at the Paris Peace Conference following World War I, and served as president of the House of Peers from 1933 to 1937. In June 1937, Konoe became prime minister of Japan on the recommendation of his mentor Saionji Kinmochi. When the Marco Polo Bridge Incident took place a month later, he oversaw an escalation of tensions with China which ultimately culminated in the Second Sino-Japanese War. During the early years of the conflict, Konoe's government presided over numerous victories against Chinese forces as well as the widespread perpetration of war crimes (including the Nanjing Massacre). In 1938, he enacted the State General Mobilization Law which massively expanded the government's control over Japanese civilians in order to place the country on a war footing. In January 1939, Konoe resigned as the Japanese military proved unable to achieve a decisive victory in China.

After resigning as Japan's head of government, Konoe served as chairman of the Privy Council until being once again appointed prime minister in July 1940. Later that year, he founded the Imperial Rule Assistance Association and oversaw the signing of the Tripartite Pact with Nazi Germany and Fascist Italy. During his second premiership, Konoe also presided over the Japanese invasion of French Indochina, the formal recognition of Wang Jingwei's puppet government in Nanjing and the conclusion of the Soviet–Japanese Neutrality Pact. Despite attempting to resolve growing tensions with the United States, a rigid timetable imposed by the military on the negotiations and Konoe's own inflexibility set the two countries on the path to war. Politically isolated, Konoe resigned as premier in October 1941 and was replaced by Hideki Tojo. Six weeks later, the Pacific War broke out after the Japanese attack on Pearl Harbor.

Konoe remained a close advisor to Emperor Hirohito until the end of World War II and played a key role in the fall of the Tōjō Cabinet in 1944. At the start of the Allied occupation of Japan in August 1945, he briefly served as a minister in the cabinet of Prince Naruhiko Higashikuni, but came under suspicion of war crimes. On 16 December 1945, Konoe committed suicide by ingesting cyanide before he could be arrested by the authorities.

== Early life ==
Fumimaro Konoe (often Konoye), was born in Tokyo on 12 October 1891 to the prominent Konoe family, one of the main branches of the ancient Fujiwara clan. This made the Konoe "head of the most prestigious, and highest ranking noble house in the realm." They had first become independent of the Fujiwara in the 12th century, when Minamoto no Yoritomo divided the Fujiwara into the Five Regent Houses (go-sekke). Japanese historian Eri Hotta described the Konoe as "First among the go-sekke"; Fumimaro would be its 29th leader. While the average height of Japanese people at that time was around 160 cm (5 ft 3 in), Konoe was over 180 cm (5 ft 11 in) tall.

Konoe's father, Atsumaro, had been politically active, having organized the Anti-Russia Society in 1903. Fumimaro's mother died shortly after his birth; his father then married her younger sister. Fumimaro was misled into thinking she was his real mother, and found out the truth when he was 12 years old after his father's death.

Upon his father's death in 1912, Fumimaro not only inherited his father's aristocratic title of kōshaku (duke or prince) but also his debt. Thanks to the financial support of the zaibatsu Sumitomo, which he received throughout his career, and the auction of Fujiwara heirlooms, the family was able to become solvent. Fumimaro's younger brother, Hidemaro Konoye, later became a symphony conductor and founded NHK Symphony Orchestra.

After graduating from Taimei Elementary School, he went on to study at Gakushuin, which was an institution to educate the children of the children of Japan's nobility. He was inspired by Inazo Nitobe, the dean of the First Higher School. Uncharacteristically for someone from a high-ranking aristocratic background, he chose to study at the First Higher School for university preparatory education, instead of staying at Gakushuin. Upon graduating in 1912, he proceeded to study philosophy at Tokyo Imperial University, where he again studied together with his former peers from Gakushuin. Konoe subsequently transferred to the law department of Kyoto Imperial University. One of his professors was the Marxist economist Hajime Kawakami. Under Kawakami's influence, Konoe became interested in socialism as a student and wrote a Japanese translation of Oscar Wilde's "The Soul of Man Under Socialism."

While in Kyoto, Konoe met the genrō Saionji Kinmochi and became his protégé. After graduation, Fumimaro turned to Saionji for advice about starting a political career, and worked briefly in the home ministry before accompanying his mentor to Versailles as part of the Japanese peace delegation.

In December 1918, ahead of the peace conference, Konoe published an essay entitled "Reject the Anglo-American-Centered Pacifism" (英米本位の平和主義を排す, eibei-hon'i no heiwashugi o haisu). In this article, he argued that western democracies were supporting democracy, peace, and self-determination only hypocritically, while actually undermining those ideals through racially discriminatory imperialism. He attacked the League of Nations as an effort to institutionalize the status quo: colonial hegemony by the western powers. This essay became known to American journalist Thomas Franklin Fairfax Millard who translated it and wrote a rebuttal in his journal, Millard's Review of the Far East. Saionji considered Konoe's writing reckless, but, after it became internationally read, Konoe was invited to dinner by Sun Yat-sen. Sun admired Japan's quick modernization; at the dinner, they discussed pan-Asian nationalism.

During the Paris Peace Conference, Konoe was one of the Japanese diplomats who proposed the Racial Equality Proposal for the Covenant of the League of Nations. When the Racial Equality Clause came up before the committee, it received the support of Japan, France, Yugoslavia, Greece, Italy, Brazil, Czechoslovakia, and China. However, U.S. President Woodrow Wilson overturned the vote, declaring that the clause needed unanimous support. Konoe regarded the rejection of the Racial Equality Clause as a significant setback and a reflection of discriminatory attitudes toward Japan.

Upon his return to Japan he published a booklet where he described his travels to France, Britain and the U.S. Konoe noted how he was angered by rising anti-Japanese sentiment in the United States and how the US government discriminated against Japanese immigrants. He also described China as a rival to Japan in international relations.

== House of Peers ==
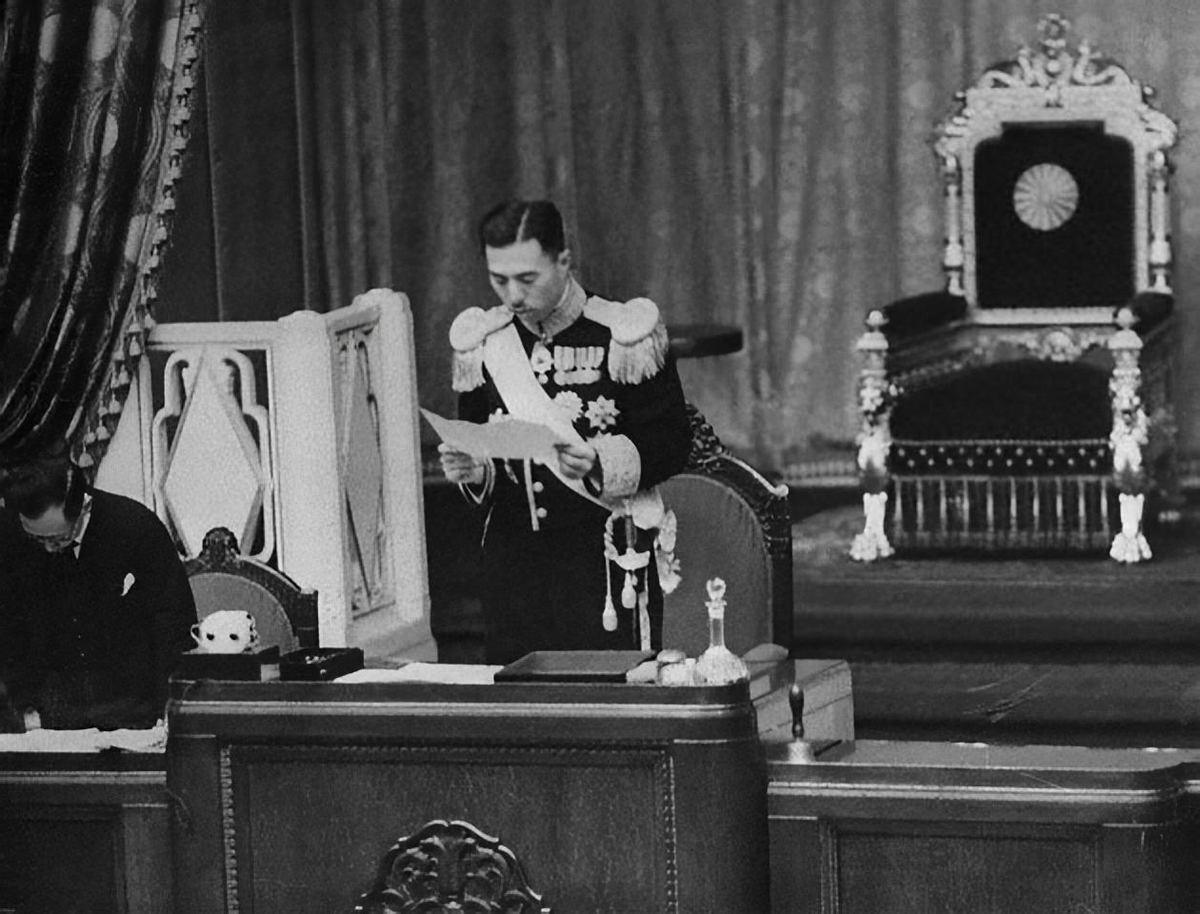
Konoe reading imperial rescript as president of the House of Peers, 1936

In 1916, while still at university, Fumimaro took his father's seat in the House of Peers, upper house of the Imperial Diet. He began playing an active role after his return from Europe and was immediately viewed as a rising star; in December 1921, the thirty-year old Konoe was elected acting president when the president and vice president were absent. Early on, Konoe came to believe that the House of Peers should use its powers sparingly and avoid undermining party governments. Konoe had initially declined to join any faction despite recruiting attempts, but in September 1922, he joined the Kenkyukai, the dominant conservative faction in the House of Peers.

During the premiership of Takaaki Katō, Konoe supported universal male suffrage to forestall serious curtailment of the noble privileges. Then a member of the Kenkyukai standing committee, he acted as a liaison between the cabinet and the Kenkyukai to help pass the suffrage bill. Konoe believed suffrage was the best way to channel popular discontent and thereby reduce the risk of revolution. As the house of peers became allied with different political factions in the lower house, Konoe left the Kenkyukai in November 1927. Konoe formed a new faction, the Kayokai, consisting of princes and marquises who held their seats by hereditary right.

Like his position in regard to the nobility, he believed that the emperor should not take political positions. In his eyes, a political emperor would diminish the imperial prestige, undermine the unifying power of the throne, expose the emperor to criticism, and potentially undermine domestic tranquillity. His greatest fear in this period of rapid industrialization would become the threat of left-wing revolution, facilitated by the petty factionalism of Taishō democracy's political factions. He saw the peerage as a bulwark of stability committed to tranquillity, harmony, and the maintenance of the status quo. Its function was to restrain the excesses of the elected government, but its power had to be used sparingly.

== Alliance with Home Ministry ==
The Japanese home ministry was extremely powerful, in charge of the police, elections, public works, Shinto shrines, and land development. The home ministry was also abused to influence elections in favour of the ruling party. Despite having once believed it to be beneath the dignity of a nobleman, Konoe entered into an alliance with important home ministry officials. The most important among these officials was Yoshiharu Tazawa, whom he met after he became the managing director of the Japan Youth Hall (Nippon Seinenkan) in 1921. Konoe and his allies saw the influence of local meiboka political bosses as a threat to Japan's political stability. Universal suffrage had opened the vote to the undereducated peasantry, but local bosses, using pork-barrel politics, manipulated their influence on the government. These officials also shared Konoe's concern about party influence within the home ministry, which had seen great turnover mirroring the political upheaval occurring in the Diet. Konoe's association with the youth hall began two months after the publication of an article in July 1921, where he stressed education of the electorate's political wisdom and morality, and lamented that education only taught youth to accept ideas passively from their superiors. The Youth Corps (Seinendan) was thereafter created to foster a moral sense of civic duty among the people, with the overall purpose of destroying the meiboka system.

In 1925, Konoe and these officials formed the Alliance for a New Japan (Shin Nippon Domei), which endorsed the concept of representative government but rejected the value of party and local village bosses, instead advocating that new candidates from outside the parties should run for office. The Association for Election Purification (Senkyo Shukusei Dōmeikai) was also created, an organization whose purpose was to circumvent and weaken pork-barrel local politics by supporting candidates that were not beholden to meiboka bosses. The alliance formed a political party (meiseikai) but was unable to secure popular support and dissolved within two years of formation (in 1928).

== Road to first premiership ==
In the 1920s Japanese foreign policy was largely in line with Anglo-American policy, the Treaty of Versailles, and the Washington Naval Conference treaty, and there was agreement between the great powers over the establishment of an independent Chinese state. A flourishing party system controlled the cabinet in alliance with industry. The Great Depression of the 1930s, the rise of Soviet military power in the east, further insistence on limitations to Japanese naval power, and increased Chinese resistance to Japanese aggression in Asia marked the abandonment of Japanese cooperation with the Anglo-American powers. The Japanese government began to seek autonomy in foreign policy, and – as the sense of crisis deepened – unity and mobilization became overarching imperatives.

Konoe assumed the vice presidency of the House of Peers in 1931. In 1932, political parties lost control of the cabinet. Thenceforth, cabinets were formed by alliances of political elites and military factions. As Japan mobilized its resources for war, the government increased suppression of political parties and what remained of the left wing. Konoe ascended to the presidency of the House of Peers in 1933 and spent the next few years mediating between elite political factions, elite policy consensus, and national unity.

Meanwhile, Fumimaro sent his eldest son Fumitaka to study in the U.S., at Princeton, wishing to prepare him for politics and make him an able proponent of Japan in America. Unlike most of his elite contemporaries, Fumimaro had not been educated abroad due to his father's poor finances. Fumimaro visited Fumitaka in 1934 and he was shocked by rising anti-Japanese sentiment. This experience deepened his resentment of the U.S., which he perceived as selfish and racist, and which he blamed for its failure to avert economic disaster. In a speech in 1935, Konoe said that the "monopolization" of resources by the Anglo-American alliance must end and be replaced by an "international new deal" to help countries like Japan take care of their growing populations.

Konoe's views were thus a recapitulation of those he had expressed at Versailles almost 20 years earlier. He still believed that Japan was the equal and the rival of the western powers, that Japan had a right to expansion in China, that such expansion was survival, and that the "Anglo-American powers were hypocrites seeking to enforce their economic dominance of the world".

== Prime Minister and war with China ==
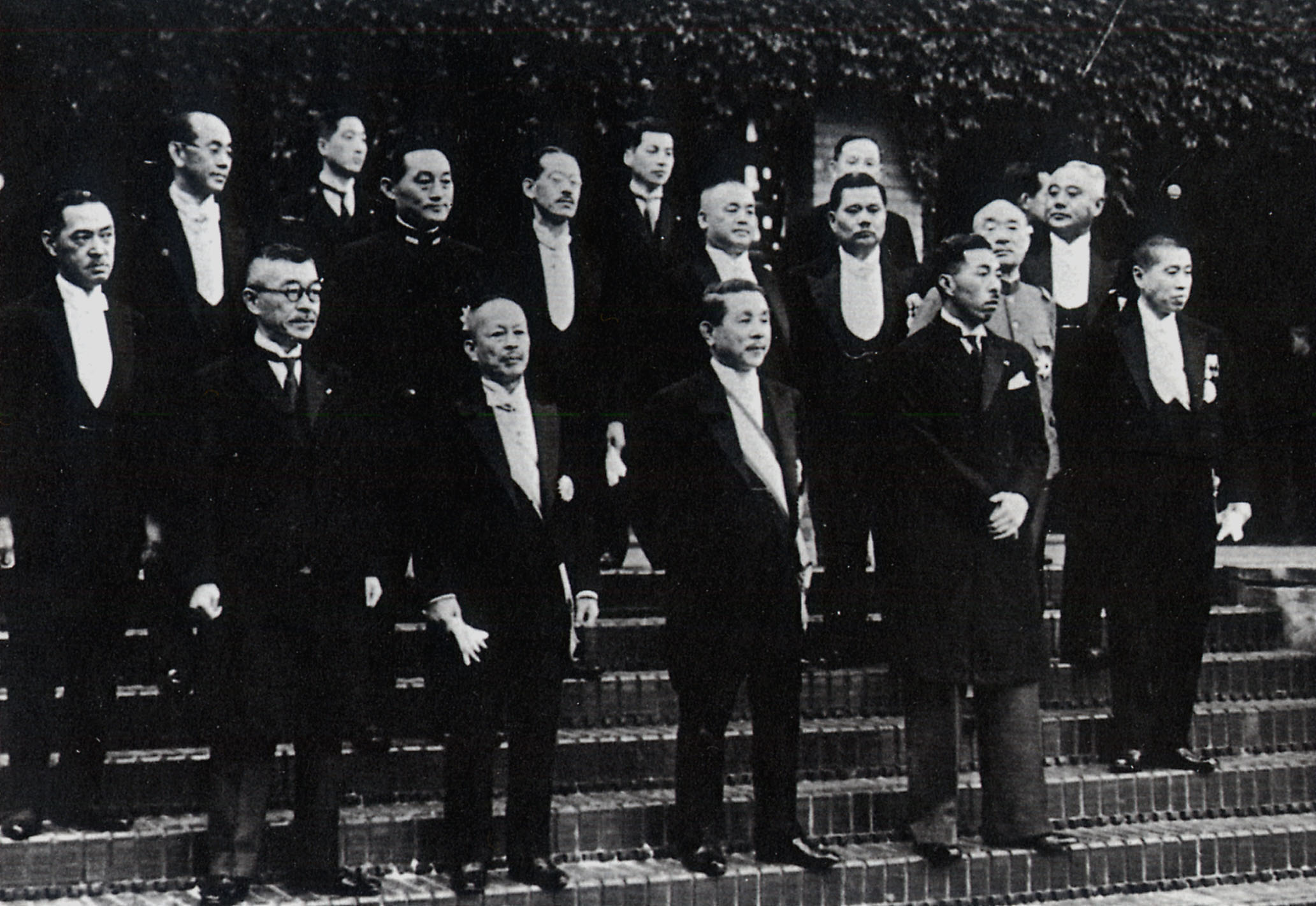
Konoe and his first cabinet ministers in 1937

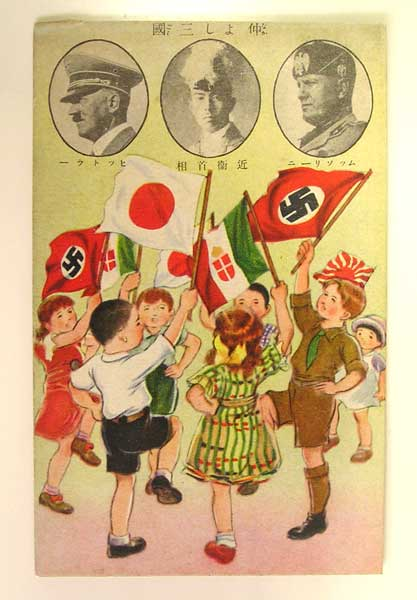
Japanese propaganda postcard published in 1938 for promoting alliance with Nazi Germany and Fascist Italy, with saying "Friendly Three Countries" and photos of Adolf Hitler, Fumimaro Konoe and Benito Mussolini

Despite his tutelage under the liberal-leaning Saionji Kinmochi, his study of socialism at university, and his support of universal suffrage, he seemed to have had a contradictory attraction to fascism, which angered and alarmed the ageing genrō. At a costume party before Saionji's daughter was married in 1937, he dressed as Adolf Hitler. Despite these misgivings, Saionji nominated Konoe to the Emperor Hirohito, and in June 1937 Konoe became Prime Minister.

Upon assuming office, First Konoe Cabinet spent the short time between then and war with China attempting to secure pardons for the ultranationalist leaders of the 26 February incident, who had attempted to assassinate his mentor Saionji. Konoe retained the military and legal ministers from the previous cabinet upon assumption of the premiership, and refused to take ministers from the political parties, as he was not interested in resurrecting party government. One month later, Japanese troops clashed with Chinese troops near Beijing in the Marco Polo Bridge Incident. Nevertheless, a consensus emerged among Japanese military leadership that the nation was not ready for war with China, and a truce was made on 11 July. The ceasefire was broken by 20 July after Konoe's government sent more divisions to China, causing full-scale war to erupt.

In November 1937, Konoe instituted a new system of joint conference between the civil government and the military called liaison conferences. In attendance at these liaison meetings were the prime minister, the foreign minister, the ministers of the army and navy, and their chiefs of general staff. This arrangement resulted in an imbalance in favor of the military, since each member in attendance had an equal say in policymaking.

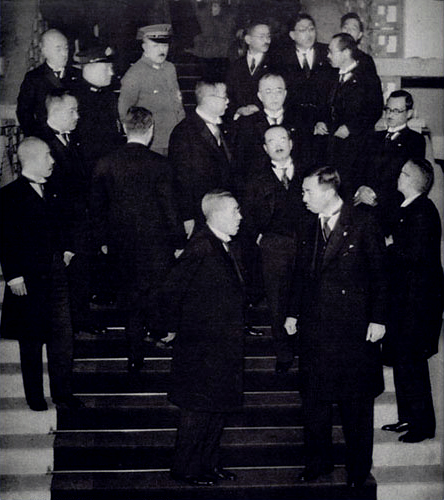
Prime Minister Kiichirō Hiranuma (1867–1952, in office January–August 1939, center, front row) and the members of his cabinet, including Minister-without-Portfolio Fumimaro Konoe (to the right of Hiranuma), Interior Minister Kōichi Kido (second row, between Hiranuma and Konoe), Naval Minister Mitsumasa Yonai (back row, with dark military suit) and War Minister Seishirō Itagaki (to the right of Yonai, with light military suit), on the inaugural day of his administration

Prior to the capture of Nanjing, Chang Kai-shek, through the German ambassador in China, attempted to negotiate, but Konoe rejected the overture.

After taking Nanjing, the Imperial Japanese Army was doubtful about its ability to advance up the Yangtze river valley, and favoured taking up a German offer of mediation to end the war with China. Konoe opposed immediate peace negotiations, and instead chose to escalate the war by suggesting deliberately humiliating terms that he knew Chiang Kai-shek would never accept in order to win a "total victory" over China.

In January 1938, Konoe issued a statement declaring that Kuomintang aggression had not ceased despite its defeat, that it was "subjecting its people to great misery", and that Japan would no longer deal with Chiang. Six days later, he gave a speech where he blamed China for the continued conflict. When later asked for clarifications, Konoe said he meant more than just non-recognition of Chiang's regime but "rejected it" and would "eradicate it". The American historian Gerhard Weinberg wrote about Konoe's escalation of the war: "The one time in the decade between 1931 and 1941 that the civilian authorities in Tokyo mustered the energy, courage and ingenuity to overrule the military on a major peace issue they did so with fatal results – fatal for Japan, fatal for China, and for Konoe himself."

Due to a trade imbalance, Japan had lost a large amount of its gold reserves by late 1937. Konoe believed that a new economic system geared toward exploitation of northern China's resources was the only way to stop this economic deterioration. In response to continued U.S. support for the so-called Open Door Policy, Konoe rejected it "as he had since Versailles, but left open possible western interests in southern China". In a declaration on 3 November 1938, Konoe said Japan sought a new order in east Asia, that Chiang no longer spoke for China, that Japan would reconstruct China without help from foreign powers, and that a "tripartite relationship of ... Japan, Manchukuo, and China" would "create a new culture, and realize close economic cohesion throughout east Asia".

In April 1938, Konoe and the military pushed a State General Mobilization Law through the Diet, which declared a state of emergency, allowed the central government to control all manpower and material, and rationed the flow of raw materials into the Japanese market. Japanese victories continued at Xuzhou, Hankow, Canton, Wuchang, and Hanyang, but Chinese resistance nonetheless continued. Konoe resigned in January 1939, leaving the war that he had a large part in making to be finished by someone else, and was appointed chairman of the Privy Council. The Japanese public, which had been told that the war was an endless series of victories, was bewildered.

Kiichirō Hiranuma succeeded him as prime minister. Konoe was awarded the 1st class of the Order of the Rising Sun in 1939.

== Konoe's second premiership, the Matsuoka foreign policy ==
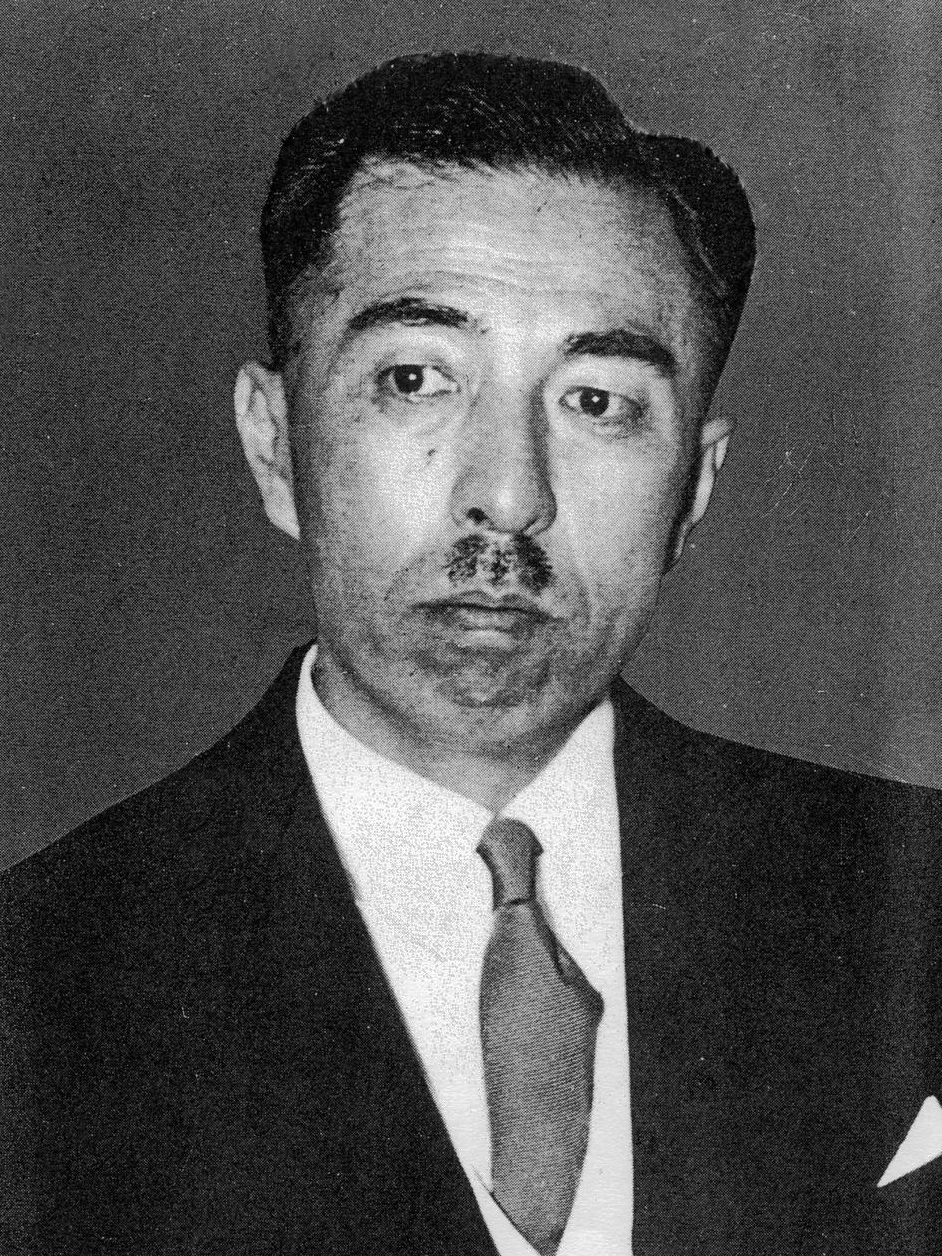
Prime Minister Fumimaro Konoe (1891–1945, in office 1937–39 and 1940–41)

Due to dissatisfaction with the policies of Prime Minister Mitsumasa Yonai later that year, the Japanese Army demanded Konoe's return. Yonai had refused to align Japan with the Nazis; in response, the army minister Shunroku Hata resigned and the army refused to nominate a replacement. Konoe was recalled after Saionji – for the last time before his death later that year – again endorsed him.

On 23 June, Konoe resigned his position as Chairman of the Privy Council, and on 16 July 1940, the Yonai Cabinet resigned and Konoe was appointed prime minister again. Konoe did set out to end the war in with China. But Konoe also deemed political parties as too liberal and divisive, thereby aiding the pro-war factions in the military.

The Imperial Rule Assistance Association (IRAA) was created in 1940 under Second Konoe Cabinet as a wartime mobilization organization, ironically in alliance with local meiboka, since their cooperation was required to mobilize the rural population. Konoe's government pressured political parties to dissolve into the IRAA, though he resisted calls to form a political party akin to the Nazi party, believing it would revive the political strife of the 1920s. Additionally, he worried that becoming the head of a political party would be beneath the dignity of a nobleman. Instead, he worked to promote the IRAA as the sole political order.

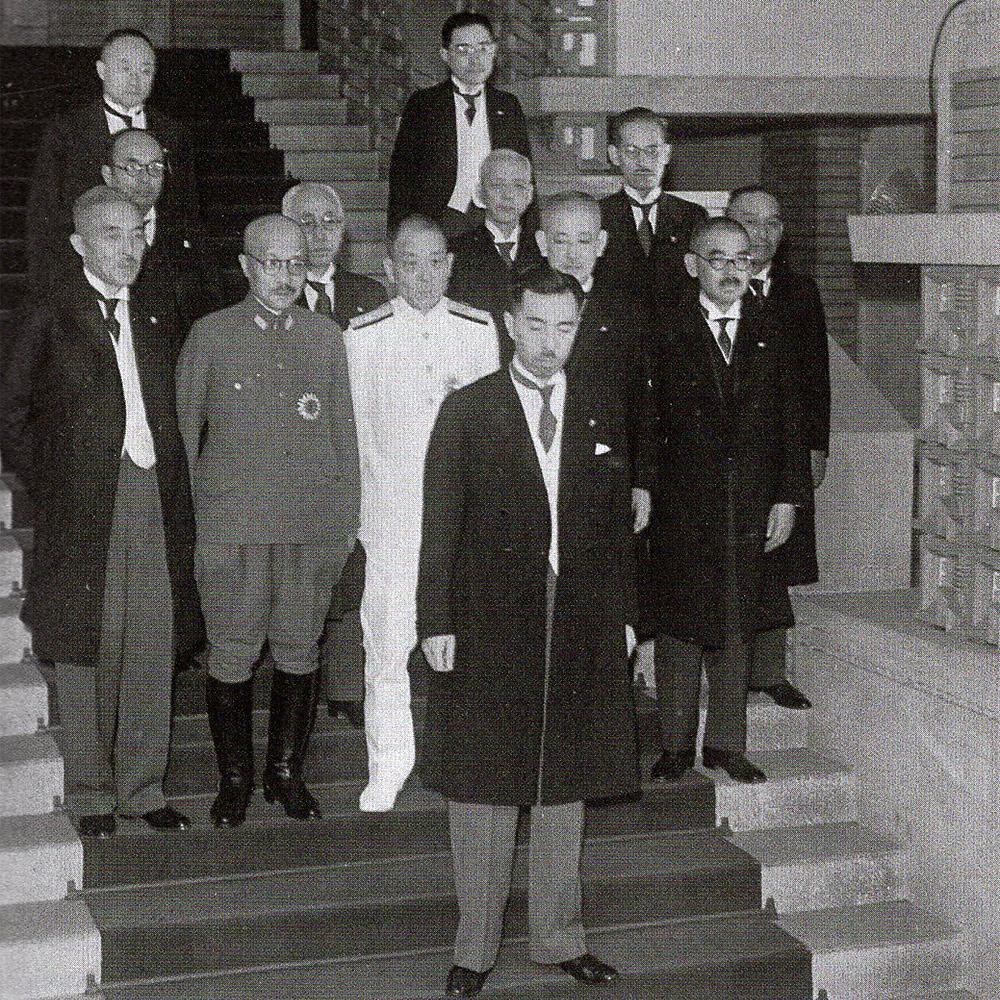
Konoe with his second cabinet ministers, including War Minister Hideki Tojo, the second row, second from the left (22 July 1940)

Even before Konoe had been recalled, the army had already planned an invasion of French Indochina. The invasion would secure needed resources to wage war with China, cut off western supply of Kuomintang armies, put the Japanese military in a strategic location to threaten more territory, and hopefully intimidate the Dutch East Indies into supplying Japan with oil. The U.S. responded with the Export Control Act and increased aid to Chiang. Despite this response, foreign minister Yosuke Matsuoka signed the Tripartite Pact on 27 September 1940, over the objection of some of Konoe's advisors, including former Japanese ambassador to the U.S. Kikujiro Ishii. In a press conference on 4 October, Konoe said the U.S. should not misunderstand the intentions of the tripartite powers and should help them to build a new world order. Additionally he said that if the U.S. did not end its provocative actions and deliberately chose to misunderstand the actions of the tripartite powers, there would be no option left but war.

In November 1940, Japan signed the Sino-Japanese treaty with Wang Jingwei, who had been a disciple of Sun Yat-sen and headed a rival Kuomintang government in Nanjing. But Konoe's government did not relinquish all the territory it held to Wang's government, undercutting the latter's authority and contributing to its common image as an illegitimate puppet. In December 1940, the British reopened the Burma Road and lent £10 million to Chiang's Kuomintang. Konoe recommenced negotiations with the Dutch in January 1941 in an attempt to secure an alternate source of oil.

In February 1941 Konoe chose Admiral Kichisaburō Nomura as Japanese ambassador to the U.S. Matsuoka and Stalin signed the Soviet–Japanese Neutrality Pact in Moscow on 13 April 1941, which made it clear that the Soviets would not help the Allies in the event of war with Japan. On 18 April 1941, word arrived from Nomura of a diplomatic breakthrough, a draft of understanding between the US and Japan. The basis of this agreement had been drafted by two American Maryknoll priests James Edward Walsh and James M. Drought, who had met Roosevelt through Postmaster General Frank C. Walker. The outline of the proposal, which had been drafted in consultation with banker Tadao Ikawa, Colonel Hideo Iwakura, and Nomura, included American recognition of Manchukuo, the merging of Chiang's government with the Japanese-backed Reorganized National Government of China, normalization of trade relations, withdrawal of Japanese troops from China, mutual respect for Chinese independence, and an agreement that Japanese immigration to the United States would proceed on the basis of equality with other nationals free from discrimination.

When Matsuoka returned to Tokyo, a liaison conference was held, during which he voiced his opposition to the draft of understanding, believing it would betray their Nazi allies. After arguing that Japan should let Germany see this draft, he left the meeting, citing exhaustion, Konoe also retreated to his villa, also claiming a fever, instead of forcing the issue. Matsuoka pushed for an immediate attack on British Singapore and began to openly criticise Konoe and his cabinet, leading to suspicions that he wanted to replace Konoe as prime minister. Matsuoka changed the U.S. draft into a counteroffer that essentially gutted most of the Japanese concessions in regard to China and expansion in the Pacific and had Nomura deliver it to Washington.

On Sunday, 22 June 1941, Hitler broke the Molotov–Ribbentrop pact by invading the Soviet Union. Coincident with the invasion, Cordell Hull delivered another amendment of the draft on understanding to the Japanese, but this time there was no recognition of the Japanese right to control of Manchukuo. The new draft also completely rejected the Japanese right of military expansion in the Pacific. Hull included a statement that in summary said that as long as Japan was allied to Hitler an agreement would be next to impossible to achieve. He did not specifically mention Matsuoka, but it was implied that he would have to be removed, as the foreign minister was now advocating an immediate attack on the Soviet Union, and did so directly to the emperor. Konoe was forced to apologize to the emperor and assure him that Japan was not about to go to war with the Soviet Union. Masanobu Tsuji had planned to assassinate Konoe if peace had occurred with the United States in order for Japan to attack the Soviet Union, which was at war with Japan's ally Germany.

Matsuoka was convinced that Operation Barbarossa would be a quick German victory, and he was now opposed to attacking Singapore because he believed it would provoke war with the western allies. After a series of liaison conferences where Matsuoka argued forcefully in favour of an attack against the Soviet Union and against further expansion southward, the decision was made to invade and occupy the southern half of French Indochina, which was formalized in an imperial conference on 2 July. Included in this imperial conference resolution was a statement that Japan would not flinch from war with the U.S. and Britain if necessary. Beginning on 10 July, Konoe held a series of liaison conferences to discuss the Japanese response to Hull's latest amendment to the draft of understanding. It was decided that a reply would not be given until the Japanese takeover of southern Indochina was complete, hoping that if it went peacefully, perhaps the U.S. could be convinced to tolerate the occupation without intervention. On 14 July, Matsuoka drafted a response – through illness – which said Japan would not abandon the tripartite pact. He attacked Hull's statement, which had been aimed largely at him, and the next day he sent the response to Germany for approval. Sending the draft to the Germans without the cabinet's permission was the final straw. Konoe and his cabinet resigned en masse and reformed the government without Matsuoka on 16 July, when Matsuoka did not attend due to illness.

== Third government and attempt to avoid war with the United States ==
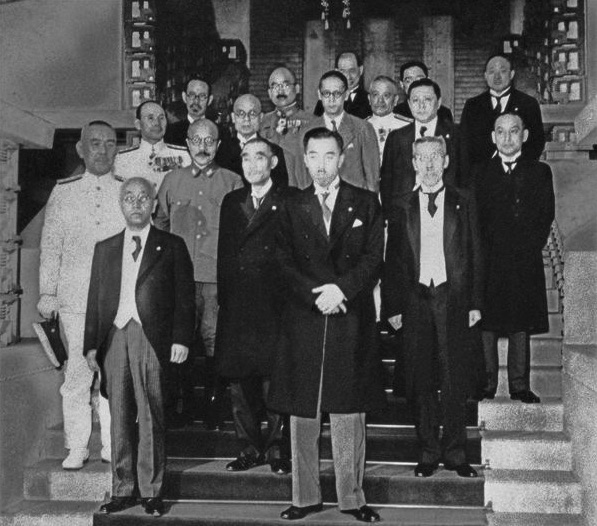
Konoe with his third cabinet ministers

The Third Konoe Cabinet was formally created on 18 July 1941, with admiral Teijirō Toyoda as foreign minister. The Franklin D. Roosevelt administration hoped that Matsuoka's dismissal would mean Japan was standing down from continued aggressive action; these hopes were dashed when the French government, after being threatened with military action, allowed the Japanese army to occupy all of French Indochina on 22 July. Two days later, the U.S. cut off negotiations and froze Japanese assets, the British, Dutch, and Canadian governments following suit shortly thereafter. The same day Roosevelt met with Nomura, where he told the ambassador that if Japan would agree to pull out of Indochina and agree to its being granted a status of neutrality, Japanese assets could be unfrozen. Roosevelt implied that Japanese expansion in China would be tolerated, but Indochina was a red line. He expressed how disturbed he was that Japan could not see that Hitler was bent on world domination. Konoe did not take aggressive action in implementing Roosevelt's offer, and could not restrain militarists, led by Hideki Tojo. As minister of war, Tojo regarded the seizure as irreversible due to its approval by the emperor.

On 28 July, the Japanese began to formally occupy southern Indochina. In response, on 1 August, the U.S. embargoed oil exports to Japan, surprising Konoe's cabinet. Finding a replacement source of petroleum was paramount, as the U.S. supplied 93% of Japan's oil in 1940. Navy chief of staff Osami Nagano informed Emperor Hirohito that Japan's oil stockpiles would be completely depleted in two years. The same day, Hachirō Arita wrote Konoe a letter telling him that he should not have let the military occupy southern Indochina while negotiations with the U.S. were still ongoing. Konoe responded that the ships were already dispatched and could not turn back in time, and that all he could do was pray for "divine intervention".

On 6 August, Konoe's government announced that it would only pull out of Indochina when the war in China was concluded, rejected Roosevelt's neutralization proposal, but promised not to expand further and asked for US mediation in ending the war in China. On 8 August, Konoe requested, through Nomura, a meeting with Roosevelt. The suggestion came from Kinkazu Saionji, the grandson of his deceased mentor Saionji Kinmochi. Kinkazu advised Konoe through a monthly informal breakfast club, where Konoe consulted with civilian elites about policy. Hotsumi Ozaki, who was a friend and advisor to Konoe, was a member of this same breakfast club; he was also a member of Richard Sorge's Soviet spy ring.

Nomura met with Roosevelt and told him about Konoe's summit proposal. After condemning Japanese aggression in Indochina, Roosevelt said he was open to the meeting, and suggested they could meet in Juneau, Alaska. On 3 September, a liaison conference was held where it was decided that Konoe would continue to seek peace with Roosevelt, but, at the same time, Japan would commit to war if a peace agreement did not materialize by mid-October. Moreover, Japan would not abandon the tripartite pact. Konoe, Saionji, and his supporters had drafted a proposal that emphasized a willingness to withdraw troops from China, but Konoe did not introduce this proposal and instead acceded to a proposal from the foreign ministry. The difference in the proposals was that the foreign ministry's was conditioned on an agreement being reached between China and Japan before troops would be withdrawn.

On 5 September, Konoe met the emperor with chiefs of staff General Hajime Sugiyama and Admiral Osami Nagano to inform him of the cabinet's decision to commit to war in the absence of a diplomatic breakthrough. Alarmed, the emperor asked what had happened to the negotiations with Roosevelt. He asked Konoe to change the emphasis from war to negotiation; Konoe replied that would be politically impossible, and the emperor then asked why he had been kept in the dark about these military preparations. The emperor then questioned Sugiyama about the chances of success of an open war with the West. After Sugiyama answered positively, Hirohito scolded him, remembering that the Army had predicted that the invasion of China would be completed in only three months.

On 6 September, the Emperor approved the cabinet's decision at an imperial conference after being given assurance by the two chiefs of staff that diplomacy was the primary emphasis, with war only as a fall-back option in the event of diplomatic failure. That same evening, Konoe arranged a dinner in secrecy with U.S. ambassador to Japan Joseph Grew. (This was somewhat perilous: on 15 August, Hiranuma Kiichiro, a member of Konoe's cabinet and former prime minister, had been shot six times by an ultra-nationalist because he was seen as too close to Grew.) Konoe told Grew that he was prepared to travel to meet Roosevelt on a moment's notice. Grew then urged his superiors to advise Roosevelt to accept the summit proposal.

The day after the imperial conference, Konoe arranged a meeting between Prince Naruhiko Higashikuni and army minister Tojo, which was an attempt to bring the war hawk in line with Konoe. Higashikuni told Tojo that since the Emperor and Konoe favoured negotiation over war, the army minister should too, and that he should quit if he could not follow a policy of non-confrontation. Tojo replied that if the western encirclement of Japan were to be accepted, Japan would cease to exist. Tojo believed that even if there was only a small chance of winning a war with the U.S., Japan must prepare for it and wage it rather than be encircled and destroyed.

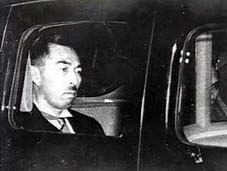
Konoe in late 1941

On 10 September, Nomura met with Hull, who told him that the latest Japanese offer was a non-starter and that Japan would have to make concessions in regard to China before the summit meeting could take place. On 20 September, a liaison meeting passed a revised proposal that actually hardened conditions for a withdrawal from China. At the liaison conference of 25 September, sensing that summit negotiations were stalling, Tojo and the militarists pressed the cabinet to commit to an actual deadline for war of 15 October. After this meeting, Konoe told lord keeper of the privy seal Kōichi Kido that he was going to resign, but Kido talked him out of it. Konoe then secluded himself in a villa at Kamakura until 2 October, leaving foreign minister Toyoda to take charge of negotiations in his absence. Toyoda asked ambassador Grew to tell Roosevelt that Konoe would only be able to grant concessions at the summit but could not commit beforehand due to the influence of the militarists and the risk that any conciliation beforehand would be leaked to the Germans in an effort to bring down the Konoe cabinet. Grew argued in favour of the summit to Roosevelt in a communication on 29 September.

On 1 October, Konoe summoned navy minister Koshirō Oikawa to Kamakura, where he secured his commitment of cooperation in acceptance American demands, the navy being acutely aware of the long odds of victory in the event of war with the U.S. Oikawa returned to Tokyo and seemed to secure the cooperation of navy chief of staff Nagano, including Toyoda as foreign minister they formed a potential majority in the next liaison conference. On 2 October, Hull delivered to Nomura a statement constituting the preconditions for a summit meeting. Hull made it clear that the Japanese army would have to demonstrate that they were going to pull troops out of French Indochina and China.

At the 4 October liaison conference, Hull's response was still being processed and could not be fully discussed; Nagano changed his position and now agreed with the army and advocated a deadline for war. Konoe and Oikawa were largely silent and did not try to bring him back to the side of negotiation, further postponing a final decision. The army and the navy were in opposition to each other and held separate high-level meetings, each respectively confirming their resolve to either go to war or pull back from the brink. But Nagano continued to oppose open confrontation of the army, while Oikawa did not want to take the lead as the only member of the liaison conference to oppose war.

Konoe met privately with Tojo twice in a failed attempt to convince him to a troop withdrawal and to take the war option off the table on 5 and 7 October. In the 7 October meeting, Konoe told Tojo that "military men take wars too lightly". Tojo's response was, "occasionally one must gather up enough courage, close one's eyes and jump off the platform of the Kiyomizu." Konoe responded that, while such a policy was okay for the individual, "if I think of the national polity that has lasted twenty six hundred years and of the hundred million Japanese belonging to this nation, I, as a person in the position of great responsibility, cannot do such a thing." The next day Tojo met with Oikawa and showed some doubt when he told him that it would be a betrayal of those who had already died in the war for the army to pull troops out of China, but that he was also worried about the many more who would die in an eventual war with the U.S., and that he was considering a troop withdrawal.

Konoe held a meeting on 12 October with military ministers Tojo and Oikawa and foreign minister Toyoda, which became known as the Tekigaiso conference. Konoe began by saying that he had no confidence in the war they were about to wage and would not lead it, but neither Oikawa or Konoe was willing to take the lead in demanding that the army agree to taking the war option off the table. Toyoda was the only member willing to declare that the imperial conference of 6 September was a mistake, implying that the war option should be taken off the table, while Tojo forcefully argued that an imperial resolution could not be violated.

On 14 October, one day before the deadline, Konoe and Tojo met one last time, where Konoe attempted to impress upon Tojo the need to stand down from war and accede to U.S. demands for a military withdrawal from China and Indochina. Tojo ruled a troop withdrawal as out of the question. In the cabinet meeting that followed, Tojo declared that the decision of the imperial conference had been thoroughly deliberated, that hundreds of thousands of troops were being moved south as they spoke, that if diplomacy were to continue they must be sure that it would result in success, and that the imperial edict had specifically declared that negotiations must bear fruit by early October (which meant the deadline had already been passed). After this conference Tojo went to see lord keeper of the privy seal Kido, to push for Konoe's resignation.

That same evening Tojo sent Teiichi Suzuki (at that time the head of the cabinet planning board) to Konoe with a message urging him to resign, stating that if he resigned Tojo would endorse prince Higashikuni as the next prime minister. Suzuki told Konoe that Tojo realized now that the navy was unwilling to admit that it could not fight the U.S. He also told Konoe that Tojo believed the current cabinet must resign and bear the responsibility of wrongfully calling for the imperial edict, and only someone of Higashikuni's imperial background could reverse it. The next day, on 15 October, Konoe's friend and advisor Hotsumi Ozaki was exposed and arrested as a Soviet spy.

Konoe resigned on 16 October 1941, one day after having recommended Prince Naruhiko Higashikuni to the Emperor as his successor. Two days later, Hirohito appointed war minister, General Hideki Tojo as the next prime minister by following Lord Keeper of the Privy Seal Kōichi Kido's advice. In 1946, Hirohito explained this decision: "I actually thought Prince Higashikuni suitable as chief of staff of the Army; but I think the appointment of a member of the imperial house to a political office must be considered very carefully. Above all, in time of peace this is fine, but when there is a fear that there may even be a war, then more importantly, considering the welfare of the imperial house, I wonder about the wisdom of a member of the imperial family serving [as prime minister]." Six weeks later, Japan attacked Pearl Harbor.

Konoe justified his demission to his secretary Kenji Tomita. "Of course His Imperial Majesty is a pacifist and he wished to avoid war. When I told him that to initiate war was a mistake, he agreed. But the next day, he would tell me: 'You were worried about it yesterday but you do not have to worry so much.' Thus, gradually he began to lead to war. And the next time I met him, he leaned even more to war. I felt the Emperor was telling me: 'My prime minister does not understand military matters. I know much more.' In short, the Emperor had absorbed the view of the army and the navy high commands."

== Post-premiership, final years of the war and suicide ==
On 29 November 1941, at a luncheon with the Emperor with all living former prime ministers in attendance, Konoe voiced his objection to war. Upon hearing of the attack on Pearl Harbor, Konoe said regarding Japan's military success, "What on earth? I really feel a miserable defeat coming; this will only last 2 or 3 months."

Konoe played a role in the fall of the Tōjō Cabinet in 1944 following the defeat in the Battle of Saipan. In February 1945, during the first private audience he had been allowed in three years, he advised the Emperor to begin negotiations to end World War II. According to Grand Chamberlain Hisanori Fujita, the Emperor, still looking for a tennozan (a great victory), firmly rejected Konoe's recommendation.

On 14 February 1945, Konoe wrote a report to Hirohito titled "The Konoe Memorial" which called for Hirohito to surrender to the Allies to prevent a "communist revolution" in Japan. He cited the threat of "communist agitators" such as Okano (alias of Japanese Communist Party leader Sanzō Nosaka), Soviet expansionism, and Pro-Soviet elements within the government.

After the beginning of the Allied occupation according to the surrender of Japan, Konoe served in the cabinet of Prince Naruhiko Higashikuni, the first post-war government. He came under suspicion of war crimes after he refused to collaborate with U.S. Army officer Bonner Fellers in "Operation Blacklist", which aimed to exonerate Emperor Hirohito and the imperial family of criminal responsibility for the war.

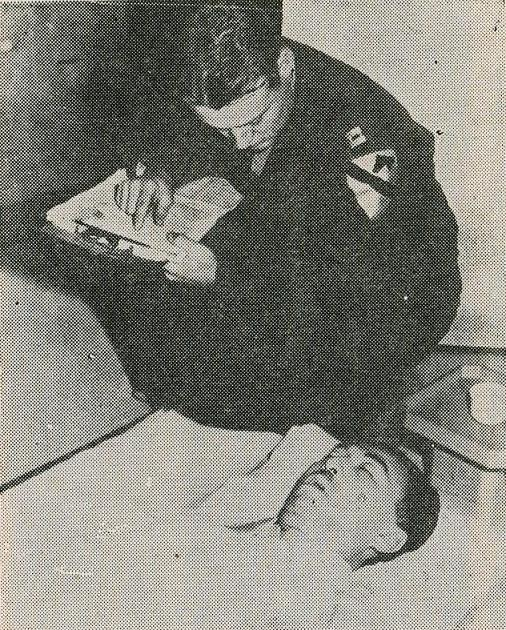
A SCAP coroner performing a postmortem on Konoe (17 December 1945)

Konoe preferred death to the humiliation of a war crimes trial. The night before he was to leave to Sugamo prison on 15 December 1945, his son Michitaka searched his room for weapons and poison. Konoe and his son talked at length that night about the invasion of China, negotiations with the US, and the heavy responsibility he felt toward the emperor and the Japanese people. Fumimaro recorded his feelings about these issues in pencil at the urging of his son. According to Michitaka, he apologized to his father for his failure to be a filial son, sensing that these may be their last moments together. His father rebuffed him, replying "What does 'to be filial' mean?", then turned away. They sat in silence until Michitaka told his father to go to sleep and asked him if he was going to leave tomorrow. Fumimaro didn't reply but Michitaka gazed at him. Fumimaro gazed back and Michitaka had never seen such a strange and distasteful expression on his father's face. For the first time he perceived the older man's intention to die. The next morning, Fumimaro had died by suicide by taking potassium cyanide. His grave is at the Konoe clan cemetery at the temple of Daitoku-ji in Kyoto.

His grandson, Morihiro Hosokawa, became prime minister fifty years later, on 9 August 1993.

== See also ==
- Prelude to the attack on Pearl Harbor
- Nanshin-ron policy
- Tekigai-sō, Konoe's villa in Suginami, Tokyo

== Ancestry ==
Ancestors of Fumimaro Konoe

8. Konoe Motosaki
4. Konoe Tadahiro
9. Kotohime
2. Konoe Atsumaro
1. Fumimaro Konoe
12. Maeda Nariyasu
6. Maeda Yoshiyasu
13. Tokugawa Tomoko
3. Maeda Sawako

== Bibliography ==
- Berger, Gordon M. (1974). "Japan's Young Prince. Konoe Fumimaro's Early Political Career, 1916–1931". Monumenta Nipponica. 29 (4): 451–475. doi:10.2307/2383896. ISSN 0027-0741. JSTOR 2383896.
- Connors, Lesley. The Emperor's Advisor: Saionji Kinmochi and Pre-War Japanese Politics, Croom Helm, London, and Nissan Institute for Japanese Studies, University of Oxford, 1987
- Hotta, Eri (2013). Japan, 1941: Countdown to infamy (First Vintage books ed.). New York. ISBN 978-0307739742. OCLC 863596251.
- Iriye, Akira. The Origins of the Second World War in Asia and the Pacific, Longman, London and New York, 1987.
- Jansen, Marius B. (2000). The Making of Modern Japan. Cambridge: Harvard University Press. ISBN 9780674003347; OCLC 44090600
- Lash, Joseph P. Roosevelt and Churchill, 1939–1941, W. W. Norton and Co, New York, 1976.
- Yagami, Kazuo (2006). Konoe Fumimaro and the Failure of Peace in Japan, 1937–1941: A Critical Appraisal of the Three-Time Prime Minister. Jefferson, North Carolina: McFarland & Company, Inc. p. 198. ISBN 9780786422425.
- Oka, Yoshitake (1983). Konoe Fumimaro: a political biography. Translated by Okamoto, Shumpei; Murray, Patricia. University of Tokyo Press. ISBN 0-86008-304-7.

Political offices
Preceded by Tokugawa Iesato	President of the House of Peers; June 1933 – June 1937	Succeeded by Yorinaga Matsudaira
Preceded by Kazushige Ugaki	Minister of Colonial Affairs; Sep 1938 – Oct 1938	Succeeded by Yoshiaki Hatta
Preceded by Kazushige Ugaki	Minister for Foreign Affairs; Sept 1938 – Oct 1938	Succeeded by Hachirō Arita
Preceded by Senjūrō Hayashi	Prime Minister of Japan; Jun 1937 – Jan 1939	Succeeded by Kiichirō Hiranuma
Preceded by Kiichirō Hiranuma	President of the Privy Council of Japan; Jan 1939 – June 1940	Succeeded by Yoshimichi Hara
Preceded by Mitsumasa Yonai	Prime Minister of Japan; Jul 1940 – Oct 1941	Succeeded by Hideki Tōjō
Preceded by Heisuke Yanagawa	Minister of Justice; Jul 1941	Succeeded by Michiyo Iwamura
