= Yōsuke Matsuoka =

Japanese politician (1880–1946)

- 松岡 洋右
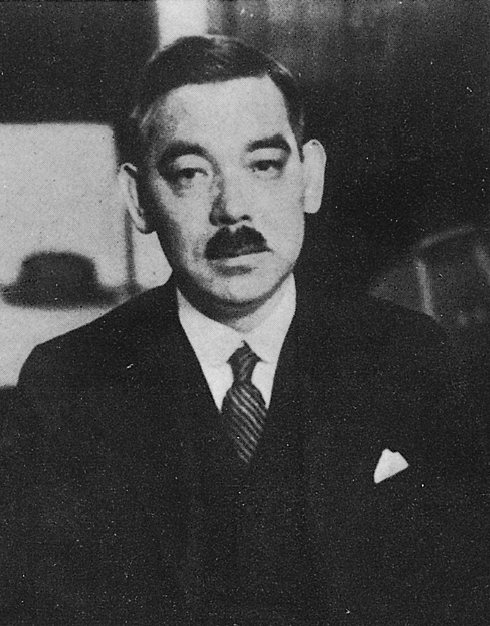
- Matsuoka in 1932

Minister for Foreign Affairs
- In office 22 July 1940 – 16 July 1941
- Prime Minister: Fumimaro Konoe
- Preceded by: Hachirō Arita
- Succeeded by: Teijirō Toyoda

Minister of Colonial Affairs
- In office 22 July 1940 – 28 September 1940
- Prime Minister: Fumimaro Konoe
- Preceded by: Kuniaki Koiso
- Succeeded by: Kiyoshi Akita

Member of the House of Representatives
- In office 21 February 1930 – 28 December 1933
- Preceded by: Ihei Kuzuhara
- Succeeded by: Torahiko Ogawa
- Constituency: Yamaguchi 2nd

Personal details
- Born: 4 March 1880 Hikari, Yamaguchi, Japan
- Died: 27 June 1946 (aged 66) Sugamo Prison, Tokyo, Japan
- Party: Rikken Seiyūkai
- Spouse: Ryūko Shin
- Children: Kenichirō; Kaneko; Yōji; Shinzō; Shirō
- Parent(s): Sanjurō Matsuoka; Yū Ogawa
- Education: Meiji University; University of Oregon
- Occupation: Diplomat, Cabinet Minister

Yōsuke Matsuoka (松岡 洋右, Matsuoka Yōsuke; March 4, 1880 – June 27, 1946) was a Japanese diplomat and Minister for Foreign Affairs of the Empire of Japan during the early stages of World War II. He is best known for his defiant speech at the League of Nations in February 1933, ending Japan's participation in the organization. He was also one of the architects of the Tripartite Pact and the Soviet–Japanese Neutrality Pact in the years immediately prior to the outbreak of war.

== Early years in Japan and the United States ==
Matsuoka was born as the fourth son to a shipping magnate in Kumage District, Yamaguchi Prefecture (now part of the city of Hikari). At the age of 11, his father's business went bankrupt, and Matsuoka was sent to the United States with a cousin in 1893 under the sponsorship of Methodist missionaries to study English. He settled in Portland, Oregon, living initially at the Methodist Mission, and was subsequently taken into the household of the widower William Dunbar, which included Dunbar's son Lambert, and Dunbar's sister, Mrs. Isabelle Dunbar Beveridge. Mrs. Beveridge served as a foster mother to Matsuoka and helped him adjust to American society. Matsuoka's affection for her lasted well after he returned to Japan. She died in 1906.

Matsuoka enrolled at Portland's Atkinson Grammar School (which still exists as Atkinson Elementary School), and due to the influence of the Mrs. Beveridge and the Dunbar family, became a Presbyterian Christian, being baptized by a Rev. Kawabe, taking the name of "Frank Matsuoka". He later moved to Oakland, California, with his older brother Kensuke and attended Oakland High School for 18 months. He then returned to Portland and studied law, paying his way by various odd jobs, including busboy, door-to-door salesman (of coffee) and interpreter for a Japanese contractor.

Matsuoka graduated from the University of Oregon law school in 1900. Although the University of Oregon had strong connections with Waseda University in Japan, Matsuoka considered going on to an Ivy League school for post-graduate studies. However, the deteriorating health of his mother influenced his return to Japan in 1902.

== Foreign service ==
On Matsuoka's return to Japan in 1902, he attempted to gain admission to Tokyo Imperial University, but was unsuccessful due to his lack of connections and the lack of acceptance of his studies overseas by the Tokyo University Law School. In 1904, Matsuoka decided to pursue a career as a bureaucrat instead, and passed the Foreign Service examinations and was accepted into the Foreign Ministry. Within two years, he was appointed vice-consul at the Japanese consulate in Shanghai. He was subsequently attached to the Governor-General of the Kwantung Leased Territory, where he became acquainted with Gotō Shinpei, then president of the South Manchuria Railway and Yamamoto Jōtarō, then working for Mitsui in developing the natural resources of Manchuria. Over the next 18 years Matsuoka advanced quickly through the ranks of diplomats. He was briefly assigned as First Secretary of the Japanese Embassy in Washington D.C. in 1914, and was a member of the Japanese delegation to the Paris Peace Conference in 1919. Matsuoka served as secretary to Prime Minister Terauchi and to Terauchi's Foreign Minister Gotō Shinpei, where his knowledge of the English language was an asset. Matsuoka was also an outspoken defender of Japanese participation in the Siberian Intervention against the Bolshevik forces in the Russian Civil War.

== South Manchurian Railway and political career ==
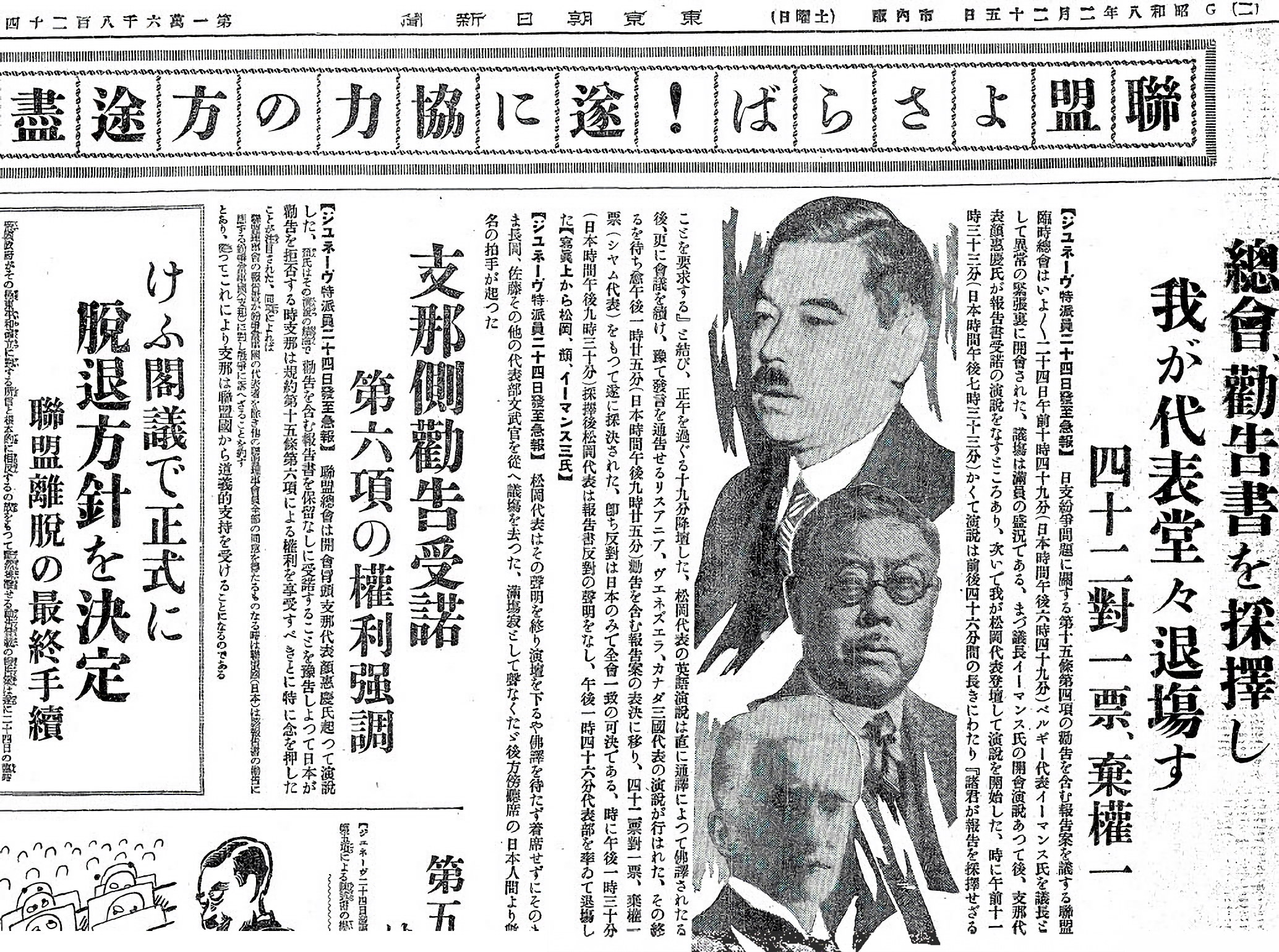
Japan withdraws from the League of Nations report in the Tokyo Asahi Shimbun, 1933.

Matsuoka was assigned as Japanese Consul to China in 1921, but turned down the assignment to return to Manchuria as a director of the South Manchurian Railway Company in 1922. In 1927, Matsuoka was promoted to the position of Vice-President of the South Manchurian Railway Company. He was also responsible for the expansion of the coal mines in Fushun and the construction of a coal liquefaction plant. However, in 1930, he resigned from the South Manchurian Railway and returned to Japan. In the 1930 General Election, Matsuoka ran for a seat in the Lower House of the Diet of Japan from Yamaguchi Prefecture with the support of the Rikken Seiyūkai (Constitutional Association of Political Friendship) political party.

However, following the Manchurian Incident of 1931, the establishment of Manchukuo and the Lytton Report to the League of Nations condemning Japan's actions, Matsuoka was drawn back into the arena of foreign affairs to head Japan's delegation to the League of Nations in 1933. Matsuoka gained international notoriety for a speech condemning the League of Nations and announcing Japan's withdrawal, leading the Japanese delegation out of the League's assembly hall.

Following his return to Japan, Matsuoka announced his resignation from the Rikken Seiyūkai and his intent to form his own political party modeled after the National Fascist Party in Italy. However, the party never gained the mass support Matsuoka had anticipated, and in 1935 he returned to Manchuria as president of the South Manchuria Railway. He held that post until 1939. Matsuoka was also a supporter of the plan to settle Jewish refugees in Manchukuo.

== Foreign Minister of Japan, 1940–1941 ==
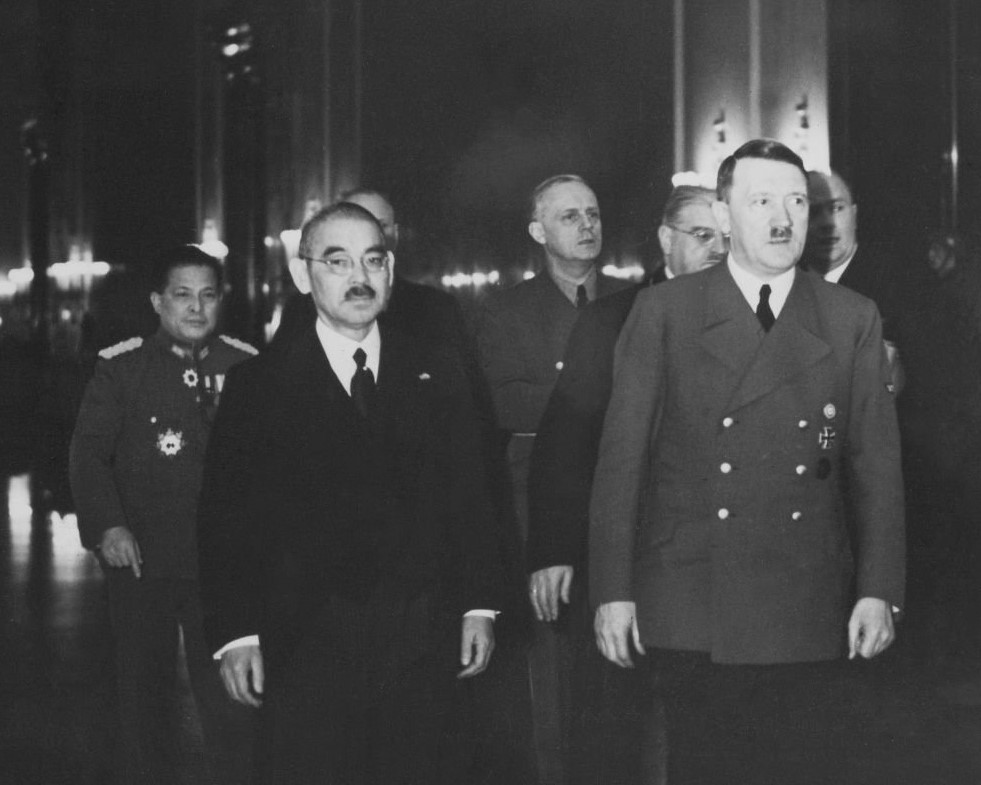
Matsuoka visits Hitler (March 1941).

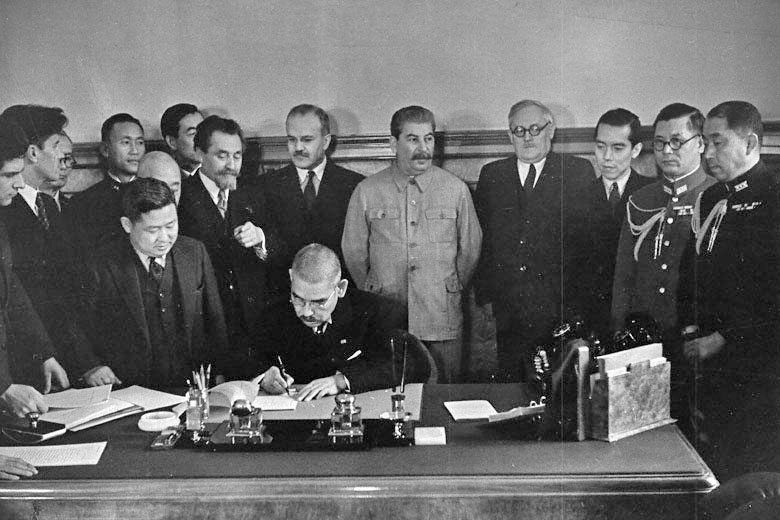
Matsuoka in Moscow signing the Soviet–Japanese Neutrality Pact in April 1941 with Joseph Stalin and Vyacheslav Molotov on the background

In 1940, Matsuoka was asked to assume the cabinet position of Minister of Foreign Affairs under Prime Minister Fumimaro Konoe. Matsuoka was a major advocate of a Japanese alliance with Nazi Germany and Fascist Italy, whose assistance he saw as a perfect balancing force against the United States, and as such was one of the primary orchestrators of the Tripartite Pact in 1940.

On December 31, 1940, Matsuoka told a group of Jewish businessmen that he was "the man responsible for the alliance with Adolf Hitler, but nowhere have I promised that we would carry out his antisemitic policies in Japan. This is not simply my personal opinion, it is the opinion of Japan, and I have no compunction about announcing it to the world."

During March–April 1941 Matsuoka visited Moscow and Berlin. On March 29, 1941, at a conversation with German Minister of Foreign Affairs Joachim von Ribbentrop, Ribbentrop was instructed to not tell the Japanese anything about the upcoming Operation Barbarossa, and that the Japanese be kept in the dark about Germany's plans. Ribbentrop tried to convince Matsuoka to urge the government in Tokyo to attack Singapore, claiming the British navy was too weak to retaliate due to its involvement in the Battle of the Atlantic. Matsuoka responded to this by stating preparations to occupy Singapore were under way.

Matsuoka also signed the Soviet–Japanese Neutrality Pact during his visit to Moscow in April 1941. However, after Nazi Germany's invasion of the Soviet Union in June 1941, Hitler proposed to Matsuoka that Japan take part in the attack as well. Matsuoka became a fervent supporter of the idea of a Japanese attack on Siberia, and constantly pressured Konoe and the leaders of the Imperial Japanese Army and Imperial Japanese Navy to mobilize the military for that purpose. In the end, both the army and the navy as well as Konoe decided to concentrate military efforts on targets south of Japan.

Despite the military's opposition to his ideas, Matsuoka continued to loudly advocate an invasion of Russia and became increasingly reckless in his diplomatic dealings with the United States, which he believed was conspiring to provoke Japan into a war. Matsuoka's hostility towards the United States (a vocal opponent of Japan's military campaigns) alarmed Konoe, who wanted to avoid war with the United States. Konoe and the military hierarchy colluded to get rid of Matsuoka. To this end, Konoe resigned in July 1941 and his cabinet ministers resigned with him, including Matsuoka. Konoe immediately was made prime minister again, and replaced Matsuoka as Foreign Minister with Admiral Teijirō Toyoda.

When the Pacific war broke out, Matsuoka professed, "Entering into the Tripartite Pact was the mistake of my life. Even now I still keenly feel it. Even my death won't take away this feeling." Matsuoka subsequently drifted into obscurity and lived in retirement through the war years.

== Post-war ==
Following the surrender of Japan, Matsuoka was arrested by the Supreme Commander of the Allied Powers in 1945 and held at Sugamo Prison. However, he died in prison of natural causes on June 26, 1946, before his trial on war crimes charges came up before the International Military Tribunal for the Far East.

In 1979, he was enshrined in Yasukuni Shrine, together with 12 convicted war criminals of the Pacific War.

Political offices
Preceded by Kichisaburō Nomura	Minister for Foreign Affairs; July 1940 – July 1941	Succeeded by Teijirō Toyoda
Preceded by Kuniaki Koiso	Minister of Colonial Affairs; September 1940 – July 1941	Succeeded by Kiyoshi Akita
House of Representatives (Japan)
Preceded by Yoichi Sawamoto...	Representative for Yamaguchi's 2nd district (multi-member); 1930–1936; Served alongside: Shigeo Nishimura, Yoichi Sawamoto, Yōji Kodama, Kenji Michimoto, Yoshimichi Kuboi	Succeeded by Shigeo Nishimura...
