= The Emperor in August =

- Theatrical release poster

Japanese name
- Kanji: 日本のいちばん長い日
Transcriptions
- Revised Hepburn: Nippon'noichiban'nagaihi
- Directed by: Masato Harada
- Screenplay by: Masato Harada
- Story by: Kazutoshi Hando
- Produced by: Hirotaka Aragaki; Nozomi Enoki
- Starring: Kōji Yakusho; Masahiro Motoki; Tori Matsuzaka; Shinichi Tsutsumi; Tsutomu Yamazaki
- Cinematography: Takahide Shibanushi
- Edited by: Eugene Harada
- Music by: Harumi Fuuki
- Production company: Asmik Ace Entertainment
- Distributed by: Shochiku
- Release date: August 8, 2015 (Japan)
- Running time: 136 minutes
- Country: Japan
- Language: Japanese
- Box office: ¥875 million

The Emperor in August (Japanese: 日本のいちばん長い日; literally "Japan's Longest Day") is a 2015 Japanese historical drama film directed by Masato Harada. It was released on August 8, 2015.

A remake of Japan's Longest Day (1967), the film depicts the chain of command of Imperial Japan's government, military, and War Council under Emperor Shōwa (Hirohito) in the immediate period before the surrender of Japan in World War II between April 1945 to 15 August 1945 (Hirohito surrender broadcast), chronicling Kantarō Suzuki's term as the Prime Minister and the final months of War Minister Korechika Anami, the Allied firebombing of Tokyo on May 25, preparations for Operation Ketsugō, the leadership's response to the Potsdam Declaration, Soviet–Japanese War and the atomic bombings of Hiroshima and Nagasaki, and the failed military coup intended to foil Japan's declaration of surrender.

== Plot ==
The film recreates the chain of historical events from April to 15 August 1945 (Hirohito surrender broadcast), which determined the further fate of Japan: the last months of the command of the armed forces of Imperial Japan and the military council under the leadership of Emperor Shōwa (Hirohito) in the period before surrender of Japan in World War II, the tenure of Kantarō Suzuki as Prime Minister and the last months of his tenure as Minister of War Korechika Anami, the Allied bombing of Tokyo, preparations for Operation Ketsugō, the reaction of the leadership to the Potsdam Declaration, Soviet–Japanese War and the atomic bombings of Hiroshima and Nagasaki, as well as a failed military coup designed to thwart surrender of Japan.

== Cast ==
- Kōji Yakusho as General Korechika Anami
- Masahiro Motoki as Emperor Shōwa (Hirohito)
- Tori Matsuzaka as Major Kenji Hatanaka
- Kenichi Yajima as Naidaijin Marquess Kōichi Kido
- Kikuo Kaneuchi as President of the Privy Council Baron Hiranuma Kiichirō
- Akaji Maro as Admiral Hisanori Fujita
- Ikuji Nakamura as Admiral Mitsumasa Yonai
- Kazuhiro Yamaji as Tōji Yasui
- Yuki Ikenobō as Empress Kōjun
- Shu Nakajima as General Hideki Tojo
- Yasumasa Oba as Lieutenant Colonel Masataka Ida
- Misako Renbutsu as Kimiko
- Erika Toda (special appearance as Miss Yasuki)
- Kenichi Matsuyama (special appearance as Takeo Sasaki)
- Shinichi Tsutsumi as Chief Secretary Hisatsune Sakomizu
- Tsutomu Yamazaki as Prime Minister Kantarō Suzuki

== Reception ==
The film grossed ¥145.48 million on its opening weekend and was number 10 at the box office. It had grossed ¥875 million by August 26. The film received ten Japan Academy Film Prize nominations, as well as the Blue Ribbon Award and Mainichi Film Awards.

== See also ==
- Japan's Longest Day (1967)
