= Kazuo Mizutani =

Japanese military chief of staff

- Born: April 22, 1899; Mie Prefecture
- Died: November 25, 1949 (aged 50)
- Military career
- Allegiance: Empire of Japan
- Branch: Imperial Japanese Army
- Rank: Chief of Staff
- Unit: First Imperial Guards Division (Eastern District Army)

Kazuo Mizutani (水谷一生, Mizutani Kazuo; April 22, 1899 – November 25, 1949) was chief of staff to Takeshi Mori, commander of the First Imperial Guards Division, at the end of World War II.

Mizutani was in his office, listening to Col. Masataka Ida's explanation of a plot to prevent Japan's surrender, when Gen. Mori was killed by the lead conspirator, Maj. Kenji Hatanaka. He then went with Ida to the headquarters of the Eastern District Army to report the murder.
