= Michinori Shiraishi =

Imperial Japanese Army lieutenant colonel (1910–1945)

- 白石 通教
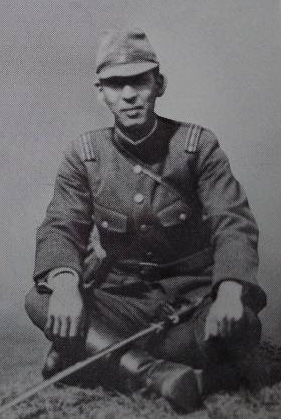
- Born: December 1, 1910
- Died: August 15, 1945 (aged 34)
- Education: Imperial Japanese Army Academy
- Family: Takeshi Mori (brother-in-law)
- Military career
- Allegiance: Empire of Japan
- Branch: Imperial Japanese Army
- Rank: Lieutenant colonel
- Conflicts: World War II; Kyūjō incident †

Michinori Shiraishi (白石 通教, Shiraishi Michinori; 1 December 1910 – 15 August 1945) was a lieutenant colonel (中佐, Chūsa) in the Imperial Japanese Army during World War II. He was the brother-in-law of General Takeshi Mori, commander of the 1st Imperial Guards Division, in charge of defending Tokyo and the surrounding region.

== Biography ==
Shiraishi (center) during his time at the Imperial Japanese Army Preparatory Academy

Very early on the morning of 15 August 1945, Shiraishi was in Mori's office when they were visited by Major Kenji Hatanaka, Lt. Colonels Jiro Shiizaki and Masataka Ida, and Captain Shigetaro Uehara, who sought Mori's aid in a coup d'état. They wished to seize the Imperial Palace and prevent the Emperor's declaration of Japan's surrender. Mori refused the conspirators, and Uehara allegedly made to kill the General with his sword; Shiraishi leapt in front of his brother-in-law, and was killed himself. Mere moments later, Hatanaka murdered General Mori.

== See also ==
- Japan's Longest Day 1967 movie based on the Kyūjō incident
