= Inaba Masao =

Japanese military officer

Lieutenant Colonel Inaba Masao (稲葉 正夫, Inaba Masao; May 1, 1908 - October 10, 1973) was a Japanese officer during World War II of the Military Affairs Bureau.

In 1945, after the Emperor and his ministers were seeking to surrender, he urged Korechika Anami, the War Minister, that the soldiers be told to keep fighting, especially with the Soviet Union massing its forces. He prepared a statement urging soldiers to fight to the bitter end, without reference to surrender. Two lieutenant colonels, one of them Masahiko Takeshita, came to tell him that the Cabinet was about to issue a statement hinting at surrender, and they hastened to broadcast his message without Anami's approval. The Director of the Information Bureau, Hiroshi Shimomura, concluded that without its broadcast, Anami might be assassinated by younger officers, and so broadcast it.

This caused consternation in the government, which feared that his statement would provoke a third atomic bomb, and arranged for the message to be sent as a news broadcast, in English and Morse code, to escape military censors and so arrive in time.

When the Kyūjō Incident was plotted, to prevent the emperor's declaration of surrender from being broadcast, Inaba refused to join the conspiracy and told the conspirators that the attempt was useless.
