= Japan's Longest Day =

1967 Japanese war film

- Theatrical release poster
- Directed by: Kihachi Okamoto
- Screenplay by: Shinobu Hashimoto
- Based on: Japan's Longest Day by Soichi Oya
- Produced by: Tomoyuki Tanaka; Sanezumi Fujimoto
- Starring: Toshiro Mifune; Chishū Ryū; So Yamamura; Toshio Kurosawa; Yūzō Kayama
- Narrated by: Tatsuya Nakadai
- Cinematography: Hiroshi Murai
- Edited by: Yoshitami Kuroiwa
- Music by: Masaru Sato
- Production company: Toho
- Release date: August 12, 1967 (Japan)
- Running time: 167 minutes
- Country: Japan
- Language: Japanese

Japan's Longest Day (Japanese: 日本のいちばん長い日, Hepburn: Nippon no ichiban nagai hi) is a 1967 Japanese epic war film directed by Kihachi Okamoto. The subject of the majority of the movie is the period between noon on August 14, 1945, and noon on August 15, 1945, when Emperor Hirohito's decision to surrender to the Allies in World War II was broadcast to the Japanese people, and the attempted coup d'état to prevent that from happening. Film historian Joseph L. Anderson describes the film as "a meticulous reconstruction of the day Japan surrendered and thus ended the Pacific War.

== Cast ==
- Toshiro Mifune as Minister of War Korechika Anami
- Chishū Ryū as Prime Minister Kantarō Suzuki
- Takashi Shimura as Head of the Cabinet Intelligence Bureau Hiroshi Shimomura
- So Yamamura as Minister of the Navy Mitsumasa Yonai
- Seiji Miyaguchi as Minister of Greater East Asia Shigenori Tōgō
- Yoshio Kosugi as Minister of Health and Welfare Tadahiko Okada
- Kakuzo Iida as Minister for Foreign Affairs Teijirō Toyoda
- Yūzō Kayama as NHK announcer Morio Tateno
- Etsushi Takahashi as Masataka Ida
- Toshio Kurosawa as Kenji Hatanaka
- Takeshi Katō as Cabinet Chief Secretary Hisatsune Sakomizu
- Kazuo Kitamura as Sato
- Rokko Toura as Matsumoto Shunichi
- Daisuke Katō as NHK Domestic Bureau Director Kenjiro Yabe
- Yūnosuke Itō as Toshio Nonaka
- Kōji Mitsui as weeping reporter
- Tatsuya Nakadai as Narrator
- Matsumoto Kōshirō VIII (special appearance) as Emperor Hirohito

== Production ==
According to Okamoto, Masaki Kobayashi was originally supposed to direct Japan's Longest Day but didn't want to, so co-producer Sanezumi Fujimoto suggested that Okamoto direct it. Okamoto believes that this film and his subsequent film The Human Bullet (1968) are expressions of his anti-war feelings. Japan's Longest Day portrays the actual people who were able to remain above the fighting, but did fight with each other, while The Human Bullet is a satire of those who did have to fight in the war.

The film featured dozens of Toho's contracted male actors as well as independent and borrowed stars like Chishū Ryū, Yūnosuke Itō, and Kōji Mitsui. Toho's Michiyo Aratama was the lone female in the cast.

== Release ==
Japan's Longest Day was released in Japan on August 12, 1967, close to the anniversary of the surrender. This started a trend of releasing World War II films on the anniversary, which included Okamoto's 1971 film The Battle of Okinawa. It became the second highest grossing film in Japan in 1967. Shinobu Hashimoto won the Kinema Junpo Award for best screenplay. The film was re-released theatrically in Japan on November 21, 1982 as part of Toho's 50th anniversary. A remake of Japan's Longest Day, identically titled in Japanese but released in English under the title The Emperor in August, was issued in 2015 by Shochiku, directed by Masato Harada.
