= Okikatsu Arao =

Imperial Japanese Army official

- 荒尾 興功
- Born: March 18, 1902
- Died: August 22, 1974 (aged 72)
- Military career
- Allegiance: Empire of Japan
- Branch: Imperial Japanese Army
- Rank: Colonel
- Conflicts: World War II; Kyūjō incident

Colonel Okikatsu Arao (荒尾 興功, Arao Okikatsu; March 18, 1902 – August 22, 1974) was one of the original plotters in a scheme to prevent Emperor Hirohito's declaration of surrender at the end of World War II. He was the chief of the War Affairs section of the Military Affairs Bureau of the Imperial Japanese Army.

== Conspiracy ==
Given his relatively high station, Arao acted as the representative of the plotters to some extent, hoping to enlist the aid of Minister of War Korechika Anami. Meeting with Anami on the night of August 13 (two days before the surrender), Arao was informed that the Minister stood behind the Emperor's decisions, and that in any case, Japan could not afford to continue fighting. Unthinkable as it was, surrender was the only option.

As one of his chief contributions to the coup, Arao drafted an 'Instruction to the Troops' which was to be broadcast to all of Japan's soldiers, encouraging them to keep fighting. This was originally supported and approved by General Anami; however, while he spoke with the War Minister, several of the more rash members of the conspiracy broadcast an earlier, more inflammatory, draft.

The following morning, Arao and the other conspirators met to plot the actual details of their plan to take over the Imperial Palace, placing the Emperor under house arrest, and preventing the surrender speech from being delivered. Arao drafted the orders that were to be given to those elements of the Imperial Guards Division and other groups involved in the coup. The conspirators then met with Anami once more; the Minister, having wavered back and forth several times in his support of their plan, once again told them the coup would have to be abandoned. He said that Army Chief of Staff Yoshijirō Umezu felt that employment of armed forces within the Palace grounds would be sacrilege.

Though he was one of the original conspirators, Arao in the end turned his back on the coup, and helped write the generals' agreement document stating that those military commanders who signed swore to abide by the Emperor's decision.

Unlike many of the other conspirators, Arao survived through the events of August 15, 1945, and would, many years later, continue to admire General Anami, and the devotion and strength it took to bring the war to an end in the way he did.

After the war, Arao was tried at the Yokohama War Crimes Trials and convicted for his involvement in the mistreatment of Allied prisoners aboard 'hell ships', where inhumane conditions led to widespread suffering and death. He was sentenced to six years of hard labor at Sugamo Prison.

== See also ==
- Kenji Hatanaka, the chief conspirator.
