= Nineteenth Army (Japan) =

Japanese Nineteenth Army
- Active: December 19, 1942 - February 28, 1945
- Country: Empire of Japan
- Branch: Imperial Japanese Army
- Type: Infantry
- Role: Corps
- Garrison/HQ: Ambon
- Nickname(s): Ken (堅, Tough)

The Japanese 19th Army (第19軍, Dai-jyūkyū gun) was an army of the Imperial Japanese Army during the final days of World War II.

== History ==
The Japanese 19th Army was created on December 19, 1942 and assigned as a garrison force for the eastern portion of Japanese-occupied Netherlands East Indies from January 7, 1943 under the administrative control of the Southern Expeditionary Army Group. It was headquartered on Ambon. On October 30, 1943, the IJA 19th Army came under the control of the Japanese Second Area Army, a subsidiary of the Kwantung Army as Imperial General Headquarters began planning for a projected invasion of northern Australia.

The projected invasion never occurred, and the IJA 19th Army remained on Ambon, largely cut off from reinforcements and resupply as the Allies bypassed Ambon in their island-hopping campaign in the South West Pacific theatre of World War II. It was demobilized on February 28, 1945 largely without having seen combat.

== List of commanders ==
=== Commanding Officer ===
	Name	From	To
1	Lieutenant General Nobumasa Tominaga	22 December 1942	15 October 1943
2	Lieutenant General Kenzo Kitano	15 October 1943	1 March 1945

=== Chief of Staff ===
	Name	From	To
1	Lieutenant General Shinnosuke Sasa	22 December 1942	7 January 1944
2	Lieutenant General Takeshi Mori	17 January 1944	1 March 1945
