= Kyūjō incident =

Failed Japanese coup d'état in August 1945

- Part of World War II and the surrender of Japan
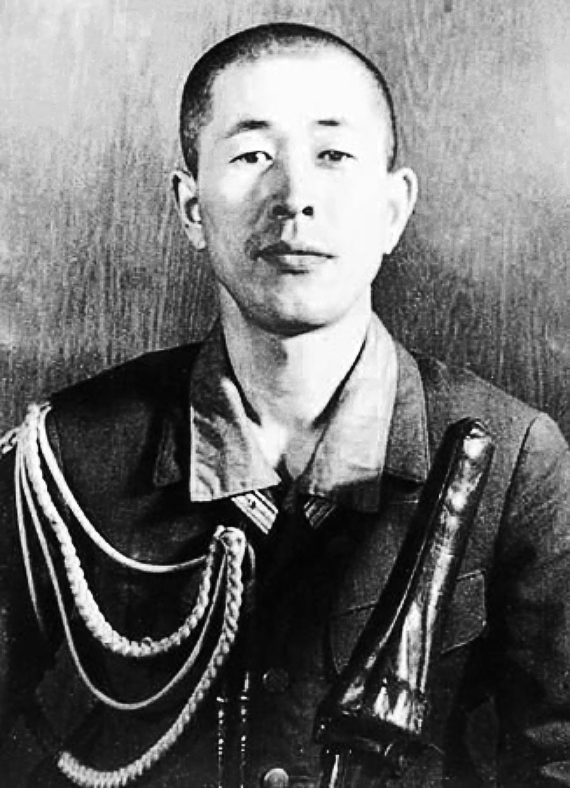
- Major Kenji Hatanaka, leader of the coup
- Date: 14–15 August 1945
- Location: Tokyo, Yokohama
- Goals: Prevent the surrender of Japan; Place the Emperor under house arrest; Destroy the Hirohito surrender broadcast recording; Assassinate Prime Minister Kantarō Suzuki
- Result: Coup failed: Several conspirators commit suicide; All surviving coup leaders arrested

Parties
| Imperial Japanese War Ministry and defectors from the Imperial Guard and the Imperial Japanese Army | Imperial Japanese government: Imperial Japanese Army; Imperial Japanese Guard |

Lead figures
| Kenji Hatanaka ‡‡; Jirō Shiizaki ‡‡; Masataka Ida; Takeo Sasaki | Hirohito; Kantarō Suzuki; Kōichi Kido; Shizuichi Tanaka; Takeshi Mori † |

Number
| 18,000 rebels; 687 officers | 25,000 soldiers |

Casualties and losses
| 4 suicides | 2 killed |

The Kyūjō incident (宮城事件, Kyūjō Jiken) was an attempted military coup d'état in the Empire of Japan at the end of the Second World War. It happened on the night of 14–15 August 1945, just before the announcement of Japan's surrender to the Allies. The coup was attempted by the Staff Office of the Ministry of War of Japan and many from the Imperial Guard to stop the move to surrender.

The officers murdered Lieutenant General Takeshi Mori of the First Imperial Guards Division and attempted to counterfeit an order to the effect of permitting their occupation of the Tokyo Imperial Palace (Kyūjō). They attempted to place Emperor Hirohito under house arrest, using the 2nd Brigade Imperial Guard Infantry. They failed to persuade the Eastern District Army and the high command of the Imperial Japanese Army to move forward with the action. When the leaders of the coup attempt recognized that they had failed to convince the remaining army to oust the Imperial House of Japan, they committed ritual suicide. The communiqué of the intent for a Japanese surrender continued as planned.

== Background ==
=== Decision to accept the Potsdam Declaration ===
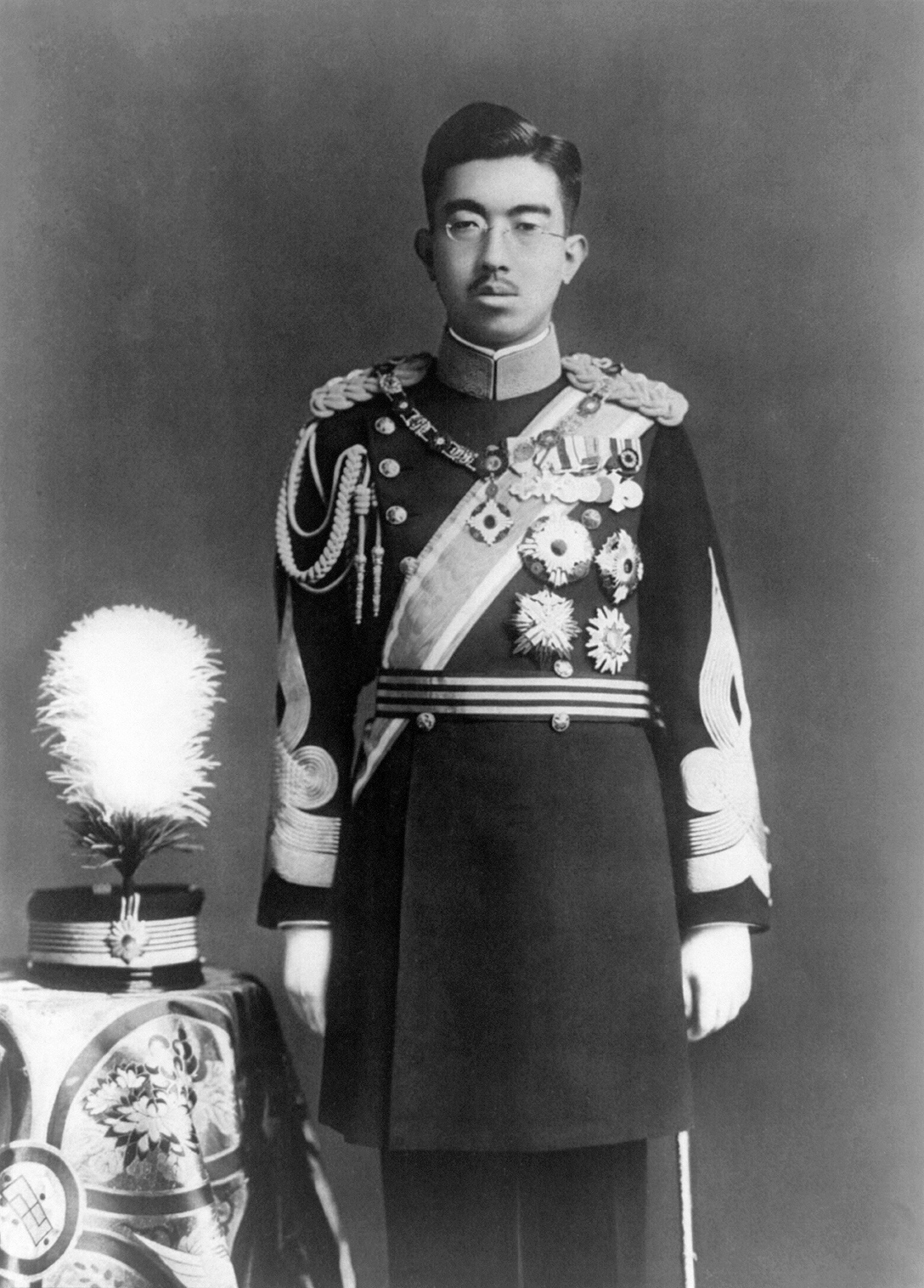
Hirohito (r. 1926–1989), Emperor of Japan

On 26 July 1945 (Berlin time), the Potsdam Conference issued a declaration on the terms for the surrender of Japan. When the Potsdam Declaration was received in Japan over shortwave, the Minister for Foreign Affairs Shigenori Tōgō brought a copy to the Emperor of Japan, Hirohito. After going over the declaration point by point, the emperor asked Tōgō if those terms "were the most reasonable to be expected in the circumstances". Tōgō said that they were. The emperor said, "I agree. In principle they are acceptable." In late July, however, the other ministers were not ready to accept the declaration.

On 9 August 1945, the Japanese government, responding to the atomic bombings of Hiroshima and Nagasaki, to the declaration of war by the Soviet Union and to the effective loss of the Pacific and Asian-mainland territories, decided to accept the Potsdam Declaration. On the same day the Supreme Council for the Direction of War opened before the Japanese Imperial court. In the council, Prime Minister Kantarō Suzuki, Navy Minister Mitsumasa Yonai, and Minister for Foreign Affairs Shigenori Tōgō suggested to Hirohito that the Japanese should accept the Potsdam Declaration and surrender unconditionally.

After the closure of the air-raid shelter session, Suzuki mustered the Supreme Council for the Direction of War again, now as an Imperial Conference, which Emperor Hirohito attended. From midnight of 10 August, the conference convened in an underground bomb shelter. Hirohito agreed with the opinion of Tōgō, resulting in the acceptance of the Potsdam Declaration. Subsequently, the Japanese envoy to Switzerland and Sweden communicated the decision to the Allies.

=== Agitation in the Army ===
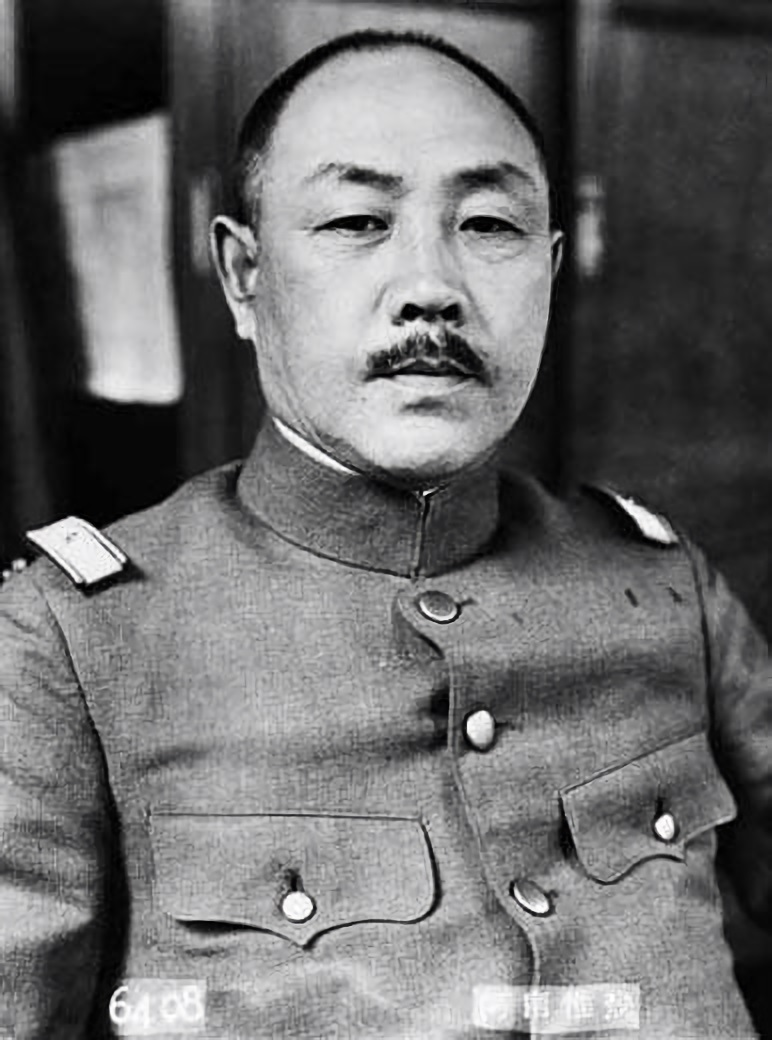
General Korechika Anami, War Minister, a key member of the army high command whom the plotters tried to win over

The War Ministry knew the decision of the conference and stirred up a fierce reaction from many officers who intended continued resistance. At 9 o'clock, in the session held at the Ministry of War, the staff officers complained to the Minister Korechika Anami, and not all of them heeded Anami's explanations. After midnight on 12 August a San Francisco radio station (KGEI) relayed the reply from the Allies, and there was a suggestion that the Allies had decided, against the requisition for the protection of the Kokutai from the Imperial Japanese government, that the authority of the sovereignty of the Japanese government and the Emperor would be subordinated to the headquarters of the Allies, a military occupational system that was also applied to the fallen German Reich. The Ministry of Foreign Affairs interpreted this sentence as restricting sovereignty, but the Japanese Army interpreted it more as enslavement. From 3 o'clock the attendees of the imperial council basically agreed to the surrender of Japan, yet the cabinet council which was supposed to be held at the same time did not concur. Also, the Supreme Council for the Direction of War tangled with the problem of protection for the Kokutai. After these proceedings, some Army officers decided that a coup d'état was needed for protection of the Kokutai. At this time, the core group of these officers had already prepared some troops in Tokyo (兵力使用計画, heiryoku shiyō keikaku, literally "military force usage plan").

Late on the night of 12 August 1945, Major Kenji Hatanaka, along with Lieutenant Colonels Masataka Ida, Masahiko Takeshita (Anami's brother-in-law), and Masao Inaba, and Colonel Okikatsu Arao, the Chief of the Military Affairs Section, spoke to Anami (the army minister and "most powerful figure in Japan besides the Emperor himself"), and asked him to do whatever he could to prevent acceptance of the Potsdam Declaration. General Anami refused to say whether he would help the young officers in treason. As much as they needed his support, Hatanaka and the other rebels decided they had no choice but to continue planning and to attempt a coup d'état on their own. Hatanaka spent much of 13 August and the morning of 14 August gathering allies, seeking support from the higher-ups in the Ministry, and refining his plot.

Shortly after the Imperial Conference on the night of 13–14 August at which the surrender was finally decided, Anami had two conversations in which he expressed opposition to the surrender. He asked Yoshijirō Umezu, the Chief of the Army General Staff, if the war should be continued "even at the risk of launching a coup d'état", to which Umezu concluded, "There is nothing we can do now but to comply with the Emperor's decision." Anami then confronted a Colonel Saburo Hayashi in a washroom and asked about the possibility of attacking a large American convoy rumored to be outside of Tokyo. Hayashi dashed Anami's suggestion by reaffirming the Imperial decision, while noting the presence of the convoy was only a rumor. Finally, Anami's brother-in-law, Lieutenant Colonel Masahiko Takeshita, confronted him, first suggesting he resign, which would topple the government; then suggesting he support the coup. To the first suggestion, Anami noted that if the government fell, that would not stop the Imperial edict; to the second, he replied that he wished to go to the Army Ministry first.

At the Army Ministry, Anami announced compliance with the Imperial edict. Then a group of senior army officers, including Anami, gathered in a nearby room. All those present were concerned about the possibility of a coup d'état to prevent the surrender. Some of those present may have even been considering launching one. After a silence, General Torashirō Kawabe, Deputy Chief of the Imperial Japanese Army General Staff, proposed that all senior officers present sign an agreement to carry out the Emperor's order of surrender. Vice Minister of War Tadaichi Wakamatsu was also present and helped draft the document. It was signed by all the most important officers present. The signatories were Minister of War Anami, Chief of the Army General Staff Umezu, commander of the 1st General Army Field Marshal Hajime Sugiyama, commander of the 2nd General Army Field Marshal Shunroku Hata and Inspector-General of Military Training Kenji Doihara. When Umezu voiced concern about air units causing trouble, Wakamatsu went next door to the HQ of the Air General Army, where its commander, Masakazu Kawabe (Torashirō's brother), also signed. This written accord by the most senior officers in the Army, in addition to Anami's announcement, acted as a formidable firebreak against any attempt to incite a coup d'état in Tokyo.

== Coup attempt ==
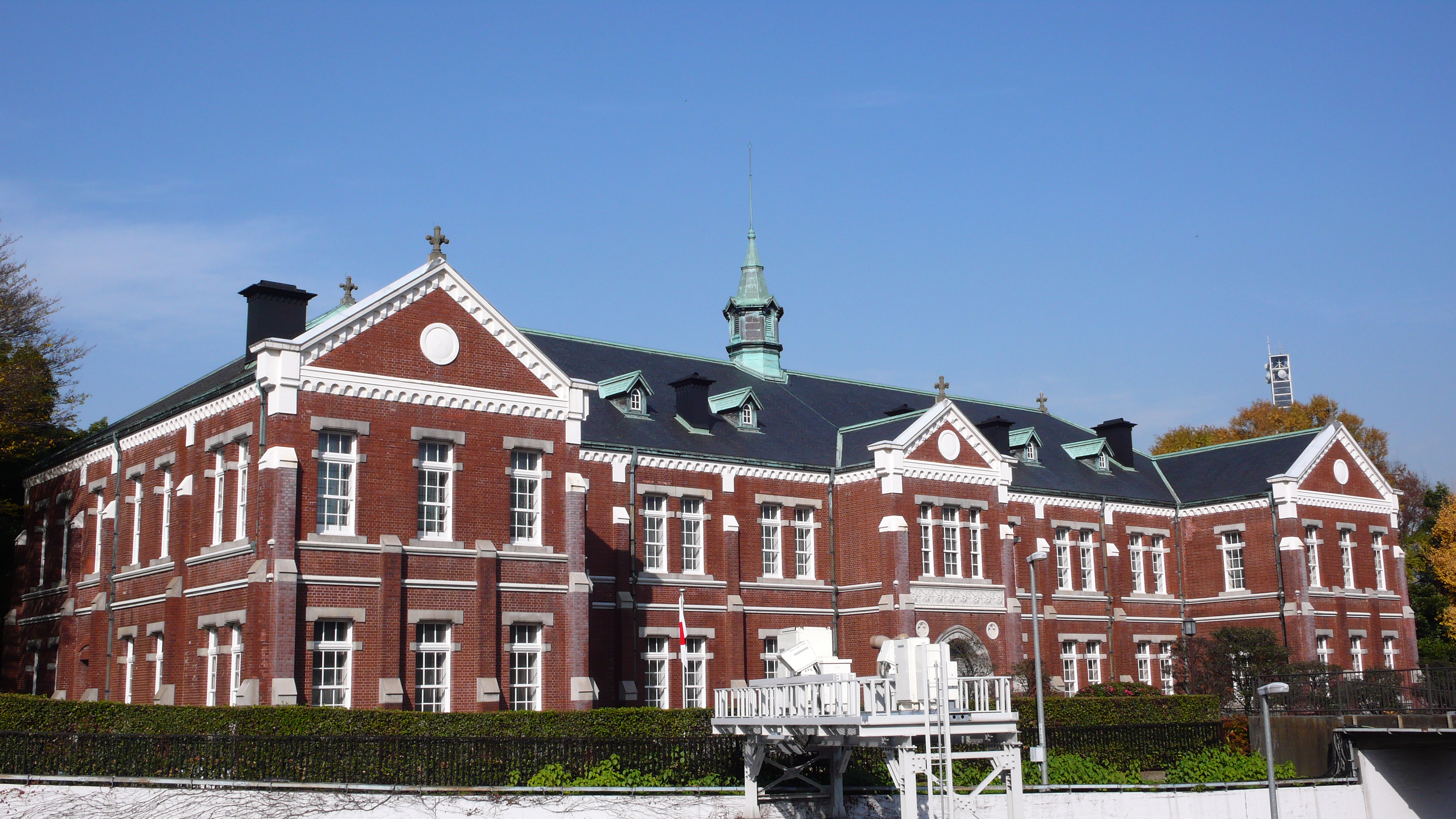
Former headquarters of the Imperial Guards

Around 21:30 on 14 August, Hatanaka's rebels set their plan into motion. The Second Regiment of the First Imperial Guards had entered the palace grounds, doubling the strength of the battalion already stationed there, presumably to provide extra protection against Hatanaka's rebellion. But Hatanaka, along with Lieutenant Colonel Jirō Shiizaki, convinced the commander of the Second Regiment, Colonel Toyojirō Haga, of their cause, by telling him (untruthfully) that Anami, Umezu, and the commanders of the Eastern District Army and Imperial Guards Divisions were all in on the plan. Hatanaka also went to the office of General Shizuichi Tanaka, commander of the eastern region of the Army, to try to persuade him to join the coup. Tanaka refused and ordered Hatanaka to go home. Hatanaka ignored the order.

Originally, Hatanaka hoped that simply occupying the palace and showing the beginnings of a rebellion would inspire the rest of the Army to rise up against the move to surrender. This notion guided him through much of the last days and hours and gave him the blind optimism to move ahead with the plan, despite having little support from his superiors. Having set all the pieces into position, Hatanaka and his co-conspirators decided that the Guard would take over the palace at 02:00. The hours until then were spent in continued attempts to convince their superiors in the Army to join the coup. At about the same time, General Anami killed himself, leaving a message that read, "I—with my death—humbly apologize to the Emperor for the great crime." Whether by "crime" he meant losing the war, the coup, or both remains unclear.

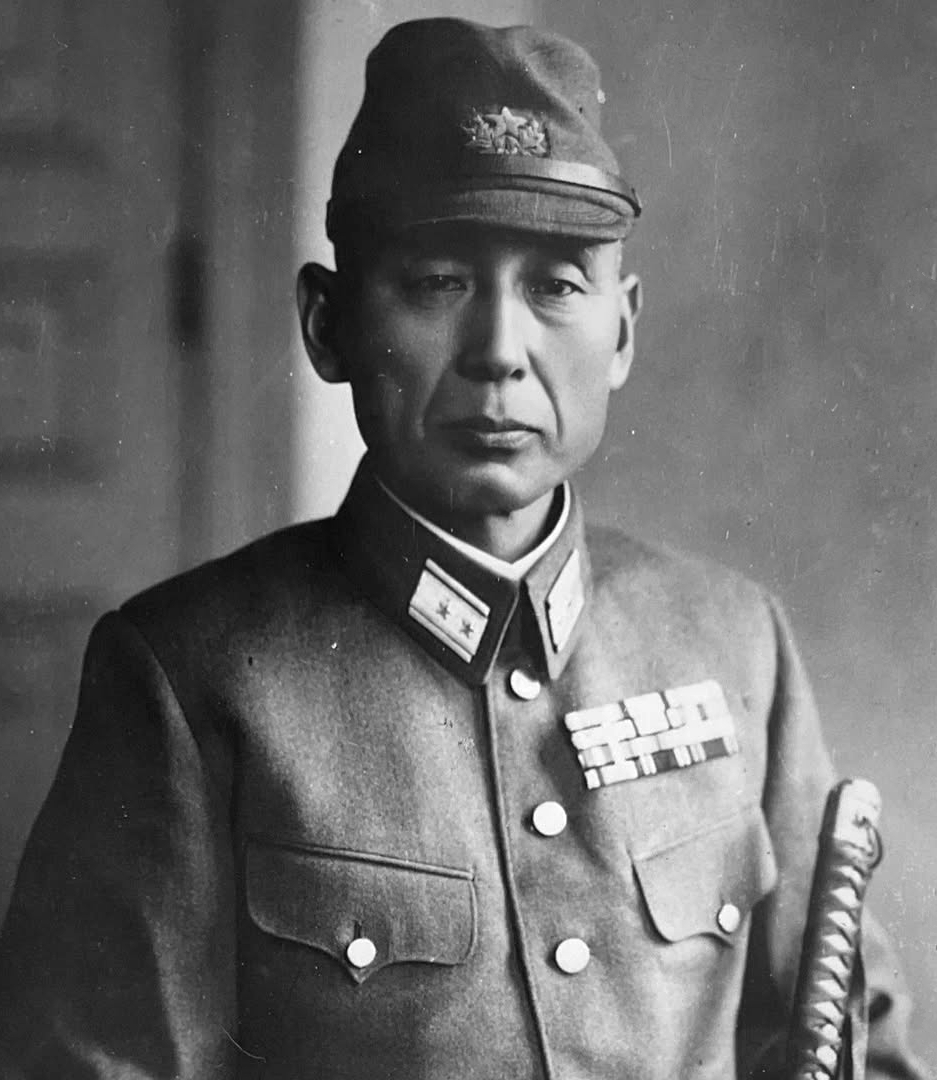
General Takeshi Mori, commander of the First Imperial Guards

Sometime after 01:00, Hatanaka and his men surrounded the palace. Hatanaka, Shiizaki, Ida, and Captain Shigetarō Uehara (of the Air Force Academy) went to the office of Lieutenant General Takeshi Mori to ask him to join the coup. Mori was in a meeting with his brother-in-law, Michinori Shiraishi. The cooperation of Mori, as commander of the 1st Imperial Guards Division, was crucial. When Mori refused to side with Hatanaka, Hatanaka murdered him, fearing Mori would order the Guards to stop the rebellion. Uehara killed Shiraishi. These were the only two murders that night. Hatanaka then used General Mori's official stamp to authorize Imperial Guards Division Strategic Order No. 584, a false set of orders created by his co-conspirators, which would greatly increase the strength of the forces occupying the Imperial Palace and Imperial Household Ministry, and "protect" the Emperor.

The palace police were disarmed and all the entrances blocked. Over the course of the night, Hatanaka's rebels captured and detained eighteen people, including Ministry staff and NHK workers sent to record the surrender speech.

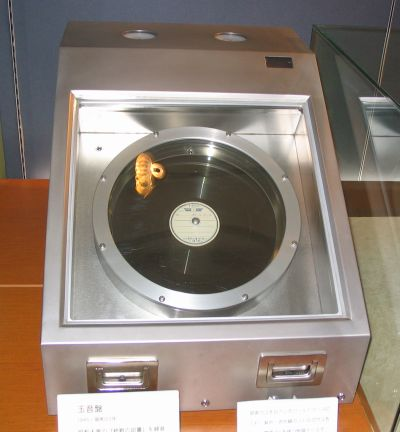
The Gyokuon-hōsō surrender record inside the NHK Museum of Broadcasting

The rebels, led by Hatanaka, spent the next several hours fruitlessly searching for Imperial Household Minister Sōtarō Ishiwata, Lord of the Privy Seal Kōichi Kido, and the recordings of the surrender speech. The two men were hiding in the "bank vault", a large chamber underneath the Imperial Palace. The search was made more difficult by a blackout in response to Allied bombings, and by the archaic organization and layout of the Imperial House Ministry. Many of the names of the rooms were unrecognized to the rebels. The rebels did find the chamberlain, Yoshihiro Tokugawa. Although Hatanaka threatened to disembowel him with a samurai sword, Tokugawa lied and told them he did not know where the recordings or men were. During their search, the rebels cut nearly all of the telephone wires, severing communications between their prisoners on the palace grounds and the outside world.

At about the same time, in Yokohama, Kanagawa Prefecture, another group of Hatanaka's rebels led by Captain Takeo Sasaki went to Prime Minister Suzuki's office, intent on killing him. When they found it empty, they machine-gunned the office and set the building on fire, then left for his home. Chief Cabinet Secretary Hisatsune Sakomizu had warned Suzuki, and he escaped minutes before the would-be assassins arrived. After setting fire to Suzuki's home, they went to the estate of Kiichirō Hiranuma to assassinate him. Hiranuma escaped through a side gate and the rebels burned his house as well. Suzuki spent the rest of August under police protection, sleeping each night in a different bed.

Around 03:00, Hatanaka was informed by Lieutenant Colonel Masataka Ida that the Eastern District Army was on its way to the palace to stop him, and that he should give up. Finally, seeing his plan collapsing around him, Hatanaka pleaded with Tatsuhiko Takashima, Chief of Staff of the Eastern District Army, to be given at least ten minutes on the air on NHK radio, to explain to the people of Japan what he was trying to accomplish and why. He was refused. Colonel Haga, commander of the Second Regiment of the First Imperial Guards, discovered that the Army did not support this rebellion, and he ordered Hatanaka to leave the palace grounds.

Just before 05:00, as his rebels continued their search, Hatanaka went to NHK studios, and, brandishing a pistol, tried desperately to get some airtime to explain his actions. A little over an hour later, after receiving a telephone call from the Eastern District Army, Hatanaka finally gave up. He gathered his officers and walked out of the NHK studio.

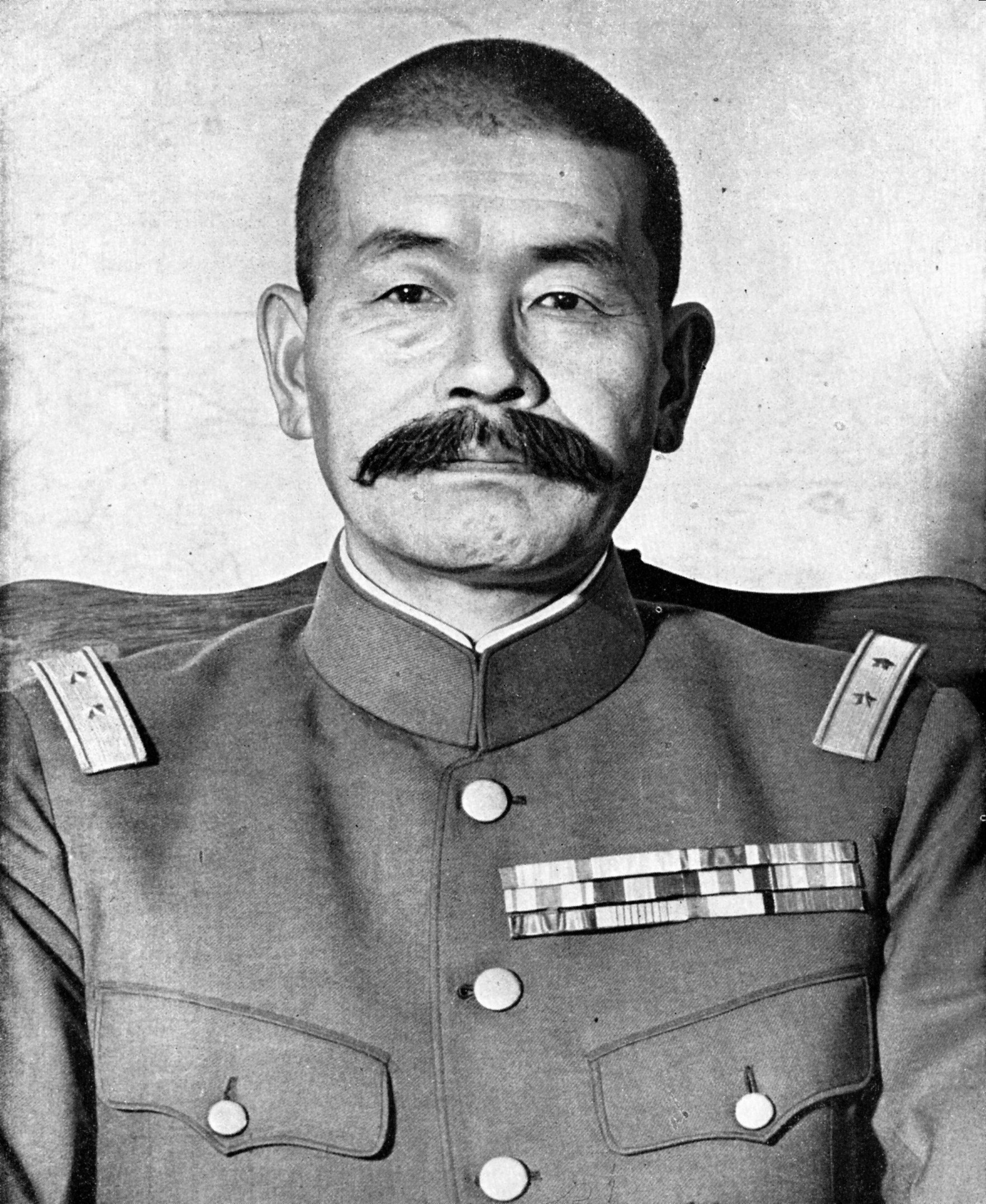
The coup collapsed after Shizuichi Tanaka convinced the rebellious officers to go home.

At dawn, Tanaka learned that the palace had been invaded. He went there and confronted the rebellious officers, berating them for acting contrary to the spirit of the Japanese army. He convinced them to return to their barracks. By 08:00, the rebellion was entirely dismantled, having succeeded in holding the palace grounds for much of the night but failing to find the recordings.

Hatanaka, on a motorcycle, and Shiizaki, on horseback, rode through the streets, tossing leaflets that explained their motives and their actions. Within an hour before the Emperor's surrender broadcast, sometime around 11:00 on 15 August, Hatanaka placed his pistol to his forehead, and shot himself. Shiizaki stabbed himself with a dagger, and then shot himself. In Hatanaka's pocket was his death poem: "I have nothing to regret now that the dark clouds have disappeared from the reign of the Emperor."

== See also ==
- Matsue incident – about forty dissidents attacked facilities in Matsue City, Shimane Prefecture on 24 August 1945
- Films depicting the Kyūjō incident:
  - Japan's Longest Day (1967)
  - Emperor (2012)
  - The Emperor in August (2015)
- 1945, an alternate history novel which depicts the coup succeeding.
- Gekokujō, or the low overcomes the high
