= Masahiko Takeshita =

IJA and JGSDF officer (died 1989)

Junior Fourth Rank Masahiko Takeshita
- 竹下 正彦
- Died: April 23, 1989
- Family: Korechika Anami (brother-in-law)
- Military career
- Allegiance: Japan
- Branch: Imperial Japanese Army; Japan Ground Self-Defense Force
- Rank: Lieutenant colonel (IJA); General (JGSDF)
- Commands: Domestic Affairs Section, Military Affairs Bureau (IJA); Command and General Staff College (JGSDF)
- Conflicts: World War II; Kyūjō incident
- Awards: Order of the Sacred Treasure, 3rd Class

Masahiko Takeshita (竹下 正彦, Takeshita Masahiko; died April 23, 1989) was a lieutenant colonel in the Imperial Japanese Army during World War II and later a general in the Japan Ground Self-Defense Force. He helped plan the Kyūjō incident in August 1945 before withdrawing from the coup.

== Biography ==
During World War II, Takeshita served as the head of Domestic Affairs Section of the Military Affairs Bureau. In August 1945, he helped plan a coup d'état, the Kyūjō incident, alongside Major Kenji Hatanaka and a handful of others. The intent was to prevent the Emperor's announcement of Japan's surrender from being broadcast.

As one of the most senior officers involved in the coup, he was, at times, the leader of the group. He believed, as did his co-conspirators and many others, that Emperor Hirohito had to be separated from his peace-seeking advisors and convinced to change his mind. They believed that the costs of repelling an Allied land invasion would not be devastating, and that, ultimately, Japan would be better off under military rule, with his brother-in-law, Minister of War Korechika Anami as shōgun.

Takeshita had a close relationship with Anami, and was among the few who had the Minister's ear; Anami considered Takeshita one of his closest confidants, and so it was through him that the rebels gained much of their information and influence. Ultimately, however, Anami insisted that while he was sympathetic with the rebels' cause, he could not actively oppose the wishes of the Emperor. Despite being so trusted by the Minister, he was at times confused as to Anami's true desires regarding the coup.

In the afternoon of August 14, Anami officially announced to the conspirators that the Cabinet had decided to terminate the war. The Cabinet operated by unanimous decision, and so this meant that Anami had given in. Faced with the now fully official opposition of the Cabinet, and the final loss of any aid Anami might have provided, Takeshita withdrew from the plot along with colonel Okikatsu Arao.

Early on the morning of August 15, 1945, Major Hatanaka spoke with Takeshita, trying one last time to convince him to rejoin the rebellion, and to secure the aid of General Anami. Takeshita refused, and realized, given the circumstances, that Anami would probably try to commit suicide. He traveled to the General's house, and acted as kaishakunin, second, in his brother-in-law's act of seppuku.

Unlike several of his co-conspirators, Takeshita survived through the events of August 15, and, as of 1968, was the head of the Command and General Staff College, a general in the Japan Self-Defense Forces.

Takeshita died on April 23, 1989. He was posthumously conferred the Junior Fourth Rank.

== Awards ==
- Order of the Sacred Treasure, 3rd Class – April 29, 1979

== Bibliography ==
- Brooks, Lester (1968). Behind Japan's Surrender: The Secret Struggle That Ended an Empire. New York: McGraw-Hill Book Company.
