= Shizuichi Tanaka =

Japanese general (1887–1945)

- 田中 静壱
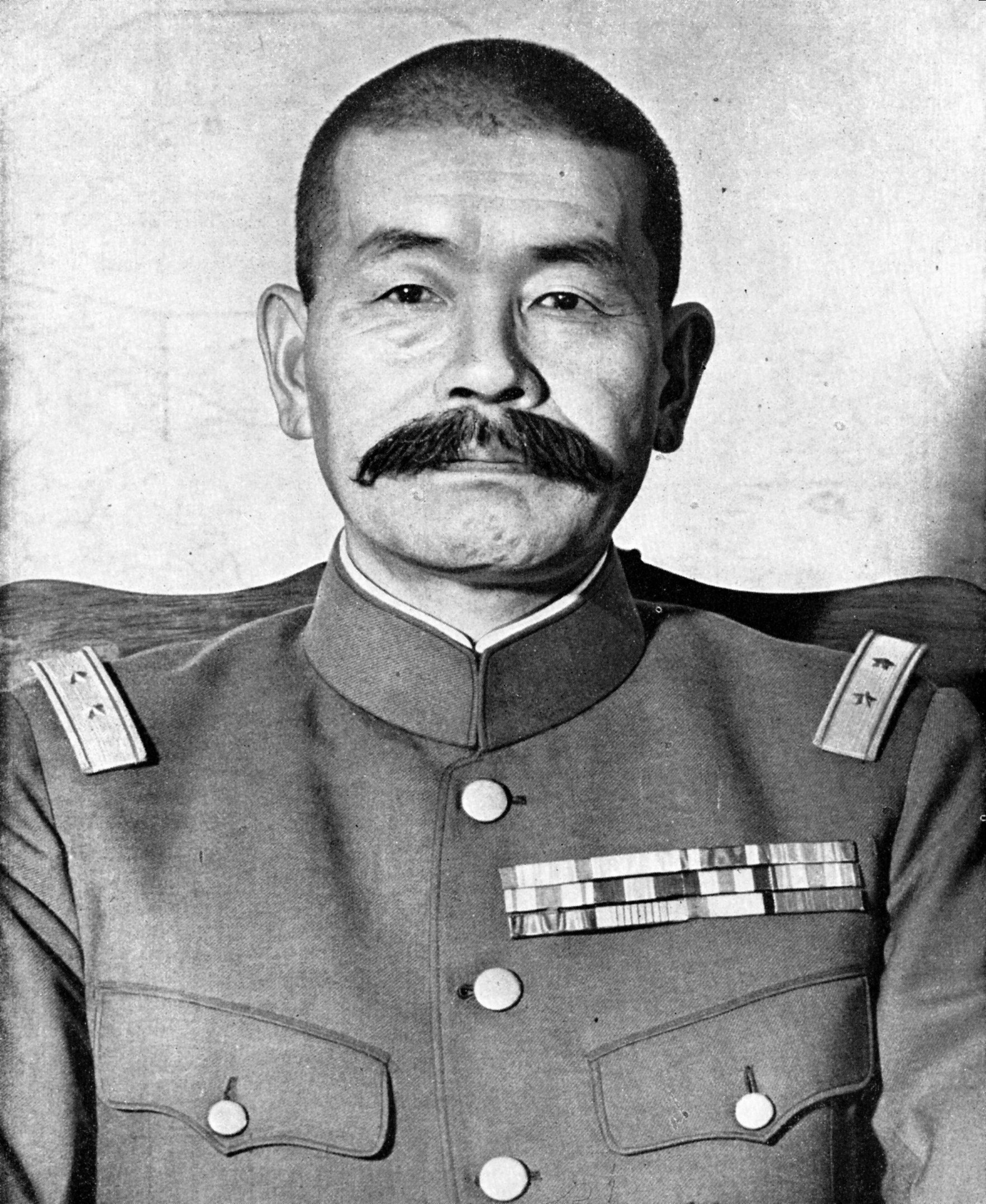

Japanese Military Governor of the Philippines
- In office 8 June 1942 – 28 May 1943
- Monarch: Emperor Hirohito
- Preceded by: Masaharu Homma
- Succeeded by: Shigenori Kuroda

Personal details
- Born: 1 October 1887 Tatsuno, Hyōgo, Empire of Japan
- Died: 24 August 1945 (aged 57) Tokyo, Japan
- Awards: Order of the Rising Sun, 1st class Order of the Sacred Treasure, 1st class Order of the Golden Kite 3rd class Order of the Crown of Thailand 3rd class

Military service
- Allegiance: Empire of Japan
- Branch/service: Imperial Japanese Army
- Years of service: 1907–1945
- Rank: General
- Unit: 10th Infantry Regiment
- Commands: 13th Division; Fourteenth Army; Eastern District Army; Twelfth Area Army
- Battles/wars: World War I; World War II; Second Sino-Japanese War; Battle of Wuhan; Battle of Zaoyang–Yichang; Kyūjō incident

Shizuichi Tanaka (田中 静壱, Tanaka Shizuichi; 1 October 1887 – 24 August 1945) was a general in the Imperial Japanese Army and Japanese Military Governor of the Philippines during World War II.

== Biography ==
=== Early life and military service ===
Tanaka was born in Issai village, Hyōgo prefecture (now part of the city of Tatsuno) and was the younger son of a large landowner. His family claim descent from Akamatsu Mitsusuke, and served as village heads during the Edo period. Tanaka graduated from the 19th class of the Imperial Japanese Army Academy in 1907. One of his classmates was Masaharu Homma. He graduated with honors 28th class of the Army Staff College in 1916, specializing in infantry, and was sent on an Army scholarship to England, where he earned a degree in English literature at Oxford University where he studied the works of William Shakespeare. He was the flag bearer for the Japanese troops in London's victory parade at the end of World War I in July 1918. He was promoted to major in 1922. In May 1926, he was assigned as military liaison to the Japanese consulate in Mexico. He was promoted to lieutenant colonel in March 1927, and from March 1928 headed the North American Bureau within the Imperial Japanese Army General Staff. Promoted to colonel in August 1930, he was assigned command of the IJA 2nd Infantry Regiment until May 1932.

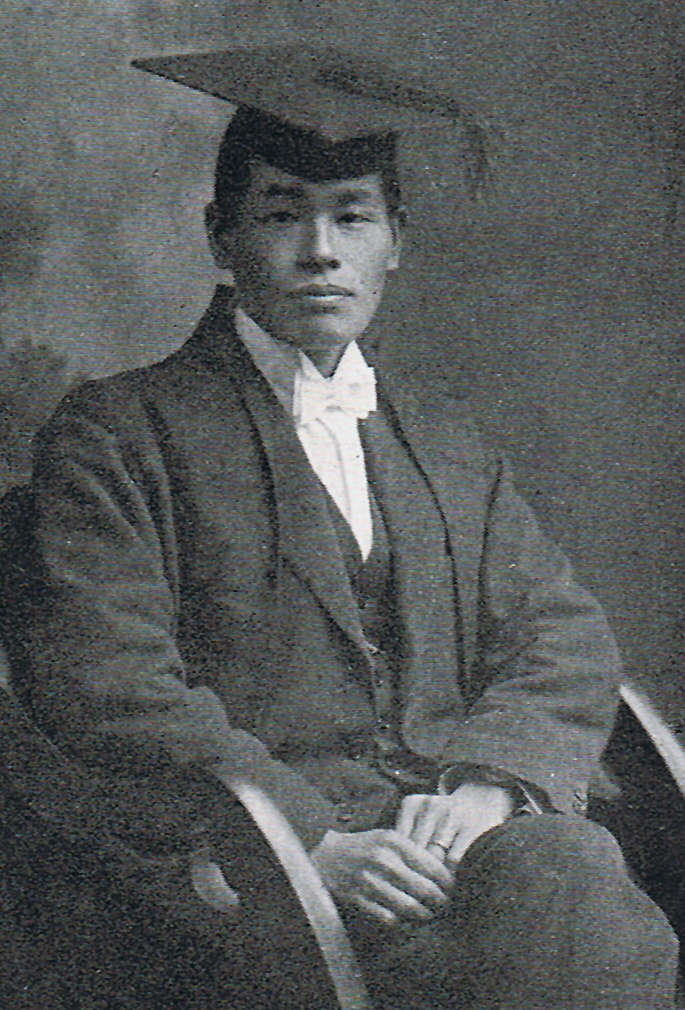
Captain Shizuichi Tanaka as a student of Oxford University, 1920

Tanaka was subsequently posted as a military attaché to Washington D.C., where he met Douglas MacArthur while MacArthur was Chief of Staff of the United States Army. He remained in the United States until May 1934. As a result of his long service in the United States and United Kingdom, and his openly pro-western sentiments, he was passed over for promotions as Japan militarized. From August 1934 to August 1935, Tanaka was Chief of Staff of the Osaka-based IJA 4th Division. He was promoted to major general in August 1935 and was assigned command of the IJA 5th Infantry Brigade, which as a garrison force based in Manchukuo. A year later, he became director of the General Affairs department of the Kempeitai, and year after that, in August 1937, became commander of the Kempeitai in the Kwantung Leased Territory. He was promoted to lieutenant general in July 1938 and commander of the Kempeitai the following month.

=== World War II ===
In August 1939, Tanaka was assigned as commander of the IJA 13th Division, and spent the following year in combat on the front lines during the Second Sino-Japanese War, especially the Battle of Wuhan and the Battle of Zaoyang–Yichang. In 1940, he was awarded both the Grand Cordon of the Order of the Rising Sun and the Grand Cordon of the Order of the Sacred Treasure. He returned to Japan to resume his post as commandant of the Kempeitai in September 1940.

After the start of the Pacific War, Tanaka, who had been vocal in his opposition to the attack on Pearl Harbor, was reassigned to command of the Eastern District Army.

Tanaka was sent to the Philippines in 1942 as commander of the IJA 14th Army, and subsequently served as military governor of the Philippines from June 1942 to May 1943. However, he was forced to return to Japan in March 1943 to recover from malaria. He spent many months in the hospital, during which time he converted to the Seicho-no-Ie new religion. He was promoted to full general in September 1943. In August 1944, he was appointed commandant of the Army Staff College. In March 1945, he was assigned to head the Eastern District Army under the Japanese Twelfth Area Army. This consisted mostly of poorly trained reservists, conscripted students, and home guard militia such as the Volunteer Fighting Corps, as part of the last desperate defense effort by the Empire of Japan to deter landings of Allied forces in central Honshū.

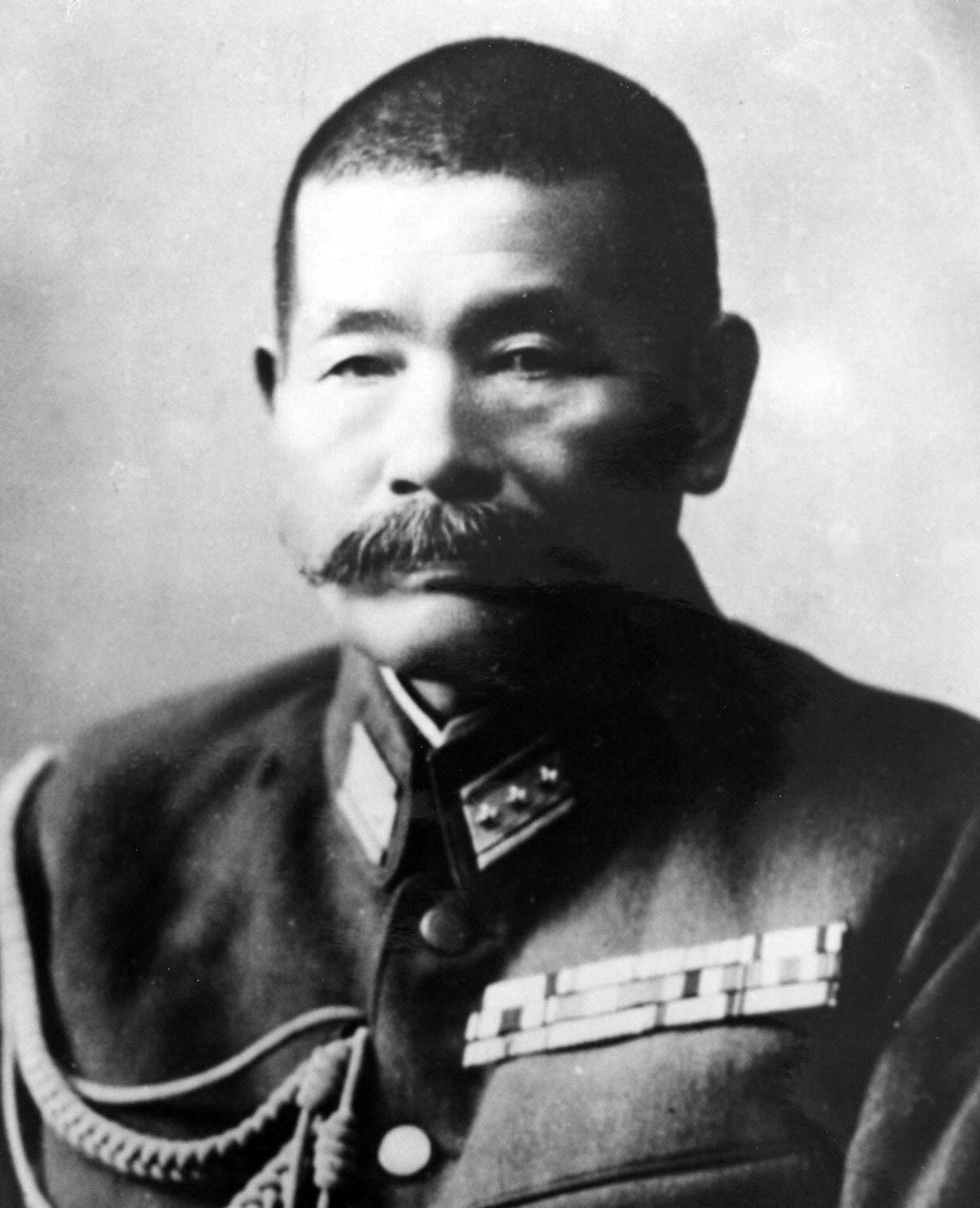
Shizuichi Tanaka as a full general

As acting commander of the 1st Imperial Guards Division, his cooperation was crucial to the 15 August 1945 rebellion planned by Major Kenji Hatanaka and others. Hatanaka sought to occupy the Imperial Palace, and to prevent Hirohito's announcement of Japan's surrender from being broadcast. When Tanaka was asked to join the rebellion, he refused, and later mobilized the Eastern District Army against the coup. After making a number of phone calls, and ordering troops to relieve the Palace, he drove there himself and berated Hatanaka and the other conspirators.

Despite being called 'the hero of the August 15 incident', and being almost single-handedly responsible for bringing an end to the attempted coup d'état, Tanaka felt responsible for the damage done to Tokyo (his jurisdiction) by Allied bombing. Since his assignment on 19 March, he had attempted to resign three times, after he failed to prevent damage to Meiji Shrine, the Imperial Palace, and other important sites, but his resignations were refused. At the surrender of Japan, Tanaka told his subordinates to destroy their unit colors, but not to commit suicide; as burning the regiment's banners would be enough, and that he intended to take full responsibility himself, on behalf of all his men.

On 24 August, at his office in Tokyo's Dai-ichi Life Building (later Supreme Commander for the Allied Powers headquarters), Tanaka shot himself through the heart; he left his desk covered in sutras, letters to his officers and his family, a statue of Emperor Meiji and a scroll bearing Emperor Hirohito's words to him following the August 15th incident.

== Notes ==
Government offices
| Preceded by Masaharu Homma | Governor-General of the Philippines; June 1942 – May 1943 | Succeeded by Shigenori Kuroda |
Military offices
| Preceded by Rippei Ogisu | Commander of 13th Division; August 1939 – September 1940 | Succeeded by Eitaro Uchiyama |
| Preceded by Masaharu Homma | Commander of Fourteenth Army; August 1942 – May 1943 | Succeeded by Shigenori Kuroda |
| Preceded by Takeshi Mori | Acting Commander of Imperial Guard Division; August 1945 – August 1945 | Succeeded by Mitsuzō Gotō |
| Preceded by Keisuke Fujie | Commander of Eastern District Army; March 1945 – August 1945 | Succeeded by Kenji Doihara |
| Preceded by Keisuke Fujie | Commander of Twelfth Area Army; March 1945 – August 1945 | Succeeded by Kenji Doihara |
