= Takeshita =

Takeshita (written: 竹下 or 武下) is a Japanese surname. Notable people with the surname include:

- Isamu Takeshita (竹下 勇, 1869–1949), Imperial Japanese Navy admiral
- Keiko Takeshita (竹下 景子, born 1953), Japanese actress
- Konosuke Takeshita (竹下 幸之介, born 1995), Japanese professional wrestler
- Masahiko Takeshita (竹下 正彦), Japanese general
- Noboru Takeshita (竹下 登, 1924–2000), Japanese politician and Prime Minister of Japan
- Rena Takeshita (竹下 玲奈, born 1981), Japanese fashion model and actress
- Reo Takeshita (竹下 玲王, born 1995), Japanese footballer
- Riichi Takeshita (武下 利一, born 1989), Japanese badminton player
- Toranosuke Takeshita (竹下 虎之助, 1924–2008), Japanese politician
- Wataru Takeshita (竹下 亘, born 1946), Japanese politician
- Yoshie Takeshita (竹下 佳江, born 1978), Japanese volleyball player
- Yuriko Takeshita (竹下 百合子, born 1988), Japanese slalom canoeist

== See also ==
- Takeshita Street in Harajuku, Tokyo, Japan
