= Shiraishi =

Shiraishi (written: 白石) is a Japanese surname. Notable people with the surname include:

- Ashima Shiraishi (born 2001), American rock climber
- Fuyumi Shiraishi (白石冬美; 1936–2019), Japanese actress, voice actress and narrator
- Haruka Shiraishi (白石 晴香; born 1995), Japanese actress and voice actress
- Hitomi Shiraishi (白石 ひとみ; born 1971), former Japanese model, adult video (AV) actress, and a movie and TV actress
- Kazuko Shiraishi (白石かずこ; 1931–2024), Japanese poet and translator
- Kazuya Shiraishi (白石 和彌; born 1974), Japanese film and television director
- Kirara Shiraishi (白石 黄良々; born 1996), Japanese sprinter
- Kojiro Shiraishi (白石 康次郎; born 1967), Japanese sailor
- Mai Shiraishi (白石 麻衣; born 1992), Japanese singer, model, YouTuber and actress
- Makoto Shiraishi (白石 洵; born 1940), Japanese sport shooter
- Marina Shiraishi (白石 茉莉奈)
- Marumi Shiraishi (白石 まるみ; born 1962), Japanese actress and media personality
- Michinori Shiraishi (白石 通教; 1910–1945), Japanese army officer
- Miho Shiraishi (白石 美帆; born 1978), Japanese actress
- Minoru Shiraishi (白石 稔; born 1978), Japanese actor and voice actor
- Noria Shiraishi (白石 のりあ; born 1981), Japanese singer and lyricist
- Ryoko Shiraishi (白石 涼子; born 1982), Japanese voice actress and singer
- Takahiro Shiraishi (白石隆浩; 1990–2025), Japanese executed serial killer and rapist

== Fictional characters ==
- An Shiraishi (白石 杏), a character in the game Hatsune Miku: Colorful Stage!
- Haruka Shiraishi (白石 遥), a character in the manga series Chu-Bra!!
- Mako Shiraishi (白石 茉子), a character in the tokusatsu series Samurai Sentai Shinkenger
  - Mamoru Shiraishi (白石 衛), Mako's father
- Urara Shiraishi (白石 うらら), a character in the manga series Yamada-kun and the Seven Witches
- Yoshitake Shiraishi (白石 由竹), a character in the manga series Golden Kamuy

== See also ==
- Musashi-Shiraishi Station
- Shiraishi Hanjiro Shigeaki
- Shiraishi Island
