= Takeshi Mori (commander) =

Imperial Japanese Army lieutenant general (1894–1945)

- 森 赳
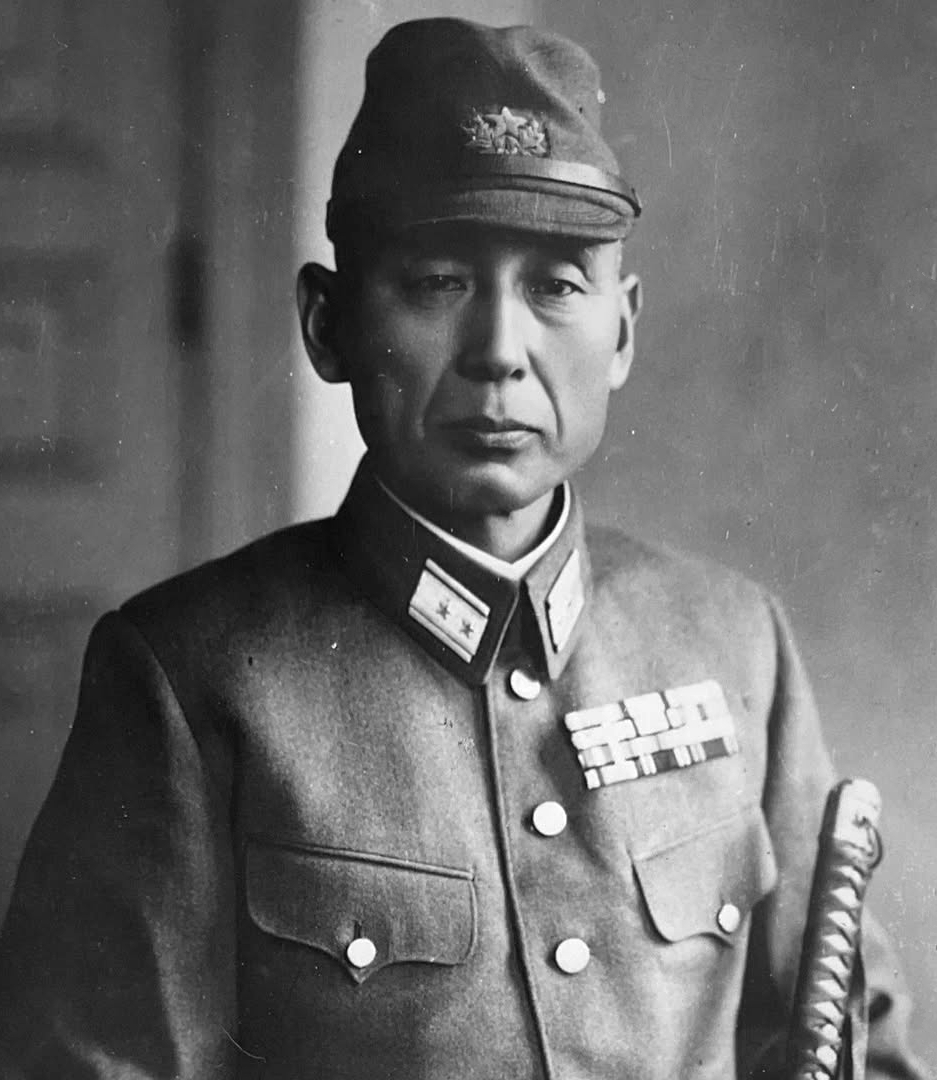
- Born: April 25, 1894; Kōchi, Japan
- Died: August 15, 1945 (aged 51); Imperial Palace, Tokyo, Japan
- Education: Imperial Japanese Army Academy; Army Staff College
- Military career
- Allegiance: Empire of Japan
- Branch: Imperial Japanese Army
- Service years: 1916–1945
- Rank: Lieutenant general
- Units: Imperial Japanese Army General Staff, Japanese First Army, 6th Army, Kempeitai, 19th Army
- Commands: 13th Cavalry Regiment; 1st Imperial Guards Division
- Conflicts: Second Sino-Japanese War; World War II; Kyūjō incident †

Takeshi Mori (森 赳, Mori Takeshi; 25 April 1894 – 15 August 1945) was a lieutenant general in the Imperial Japanese Army. He commanded the First Imperial Guards Division at the very end of World War II and was killed by Major Kenji Hatanaka during the Kyūjō incident.

== Biography ==
A native of Kōchi Prefecture, Mori graduated from the 28th class of the Imperial Japanese Army Academy in 1916, specializing in cavalry. After serving in a number of administrative roles within the Imperial Japanese Army General Staff he returned to the Army Staff College, graduating from the 39th class in 1927. He subsequently served as commander of the 13th Cavalry Regiment before returning to desk duty within the General Staff.

Mori taught at the Army Staff College from 1935 to 1937 and from 1938 to 1941. He was promoted to major general in 1941. With the start of the Second Sino-Japanese War in July 1937, Mori was assigned as a staff officer to the Japanese First Army in China from 1937 to 1938. He returned to the Asian mainland in 1941 as Vice Chief of Staff of the 6th Army in Manchukuo, and was promoted to Chief of Staff in 1942. From 1943 to 1944 he served as Deputy Commander of the Kempeitai, and from 1944 to 1945 as Chief of Staff of the 19th Army.

Mori was promoted to the rank of lieutenant general in 1945, and on 7 April, Mori became commander of the 1st Imperial Guards Division, the prestigious division assigned direct responsibility for protection of the Imperial Family of Japan.

After Japan's decision to surrender, during a meeting with his brother-in-law, Lieutenant Colonel Michinori Shiraishi, Mori received a visit just after midnight on 15 August 1945 from Major Kenji Hatanaka, Lieutenant Colonels Masataka Ida and Jiro Shiizaki, and Captain Shigetaro Uehara, who attempted to secure his aid in their plot to isolate the Imperial Palace and to prevent the announcement of Japan's surrender. At around 1:30, Ida and Shiizaki left the room, and after repeated refusals on Mori's part, Hatanaka shot and killed Mori while Uehara killed Shiraishi with a sword. His seal was then placed on a false set of orders.

== See also ==
- Colonel Kazuo Mizutani—Mori's Chief of Staff
