= Masataka Ida =

Japanese rebel (1912–2004)

- 井田 正孝
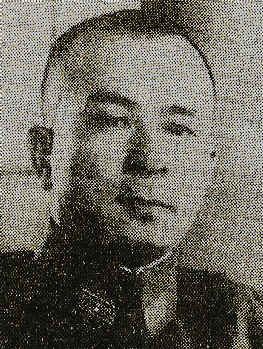
- Born: October 5, 1912; Gifu Prefecture, Japan
- Died: 6 February 2004 (aged 91)
- Military career
- Allegiance: Empire of Japan
- Branch: Imperial Japanese Army
- Service years: 1933–1945
- Rank: Lieutenant Colonel
- Conflicts: World War II; Kyūjō incident
- Other work: Chief of general affairs at Dentsu

Lt. Col. Masataka Ida (井田 正孝, Ida Masataka; 5 October 1912 – 6 February 2004) was a young Lieutenant Colonel in the Military Affairs Section of the Japanese Ministry of War, at the end of World War II. He had been stationed on Formosa (Taiwan), but was ordered back to Tokyo early in 1945. Along with Major Kenji Hatanaka and a few others, he was one of the chief conspirators in the Kyūjō incident to overthrow the government of Prime Minister Kantarō Suzuki; they wished to see the institution of martial law under War Minister Korechika Anami. The plan changed, however, into a plot, engineered by Major Kenji Hatanaka, to seize the Imperial Palace and prevent the broadcast of the Emperor's surrender speech. Lt. Col. Ida took part in this plot only briefly, trying to talk Hatanaka out of it by the end. Not many know about his attempted 'coup', which, although it failed, came dangerously close to lengthening the war, and altering the face of modern history.

Ida saw the surrender as suicide on the part of the nation as a whole, and as an attempt by the Cabinet members to save their own lives, with no regard for the nation's honor. He decided that the only way for the military to regain its honor, and apologize to the Emperor for being defeated was for them to commit mass suicide by seppuku. Failing that, he intended to commit seppuku himself. Upon being asked by Major Hatanaka, the creator of the plot, to join him, he replied that the plot offered no guarantee of success, and might even lead to a civil war. He refused to join the plot, opting instead to continue his preparations for suicide.

Ida was convinced for a time to help Hatanaka, by asking for support from Lt. Gen. Takeshi Mori of the 1st Imperial Guards Division, and from the Eastern District Army. As he explained his reasoning to Mori, he became more and more passionate about going through with the plot. However, after Mori's refusal to support the uprising, and subsequent murder, and Ida's inability to gain the support of the Eastern District Army, he decided that the plan could never succeed. He went to the Imperial Palace to warn Hatanaka that the Eastern District Army was on their way to stop him, and that he should give up. Ida felt that there was no longer a chance for success, and the only honorable end to it could come from suicide.

Convinced he had done all he could to dissuade Hatanaka, Ida went to tell War Minister Korechika Anami of the occupation of the Palace. Told that Anami was preparing to commit seppuku, Ida informed the Minister of his intentions to do the same. Anami insisted that he live on, that it was more courageous to work for the rebuilding of Japan than to commit suicide. Anami killed himself, and Ida was placed under watch to make sure he did not do the same. Following Anami's orders, Ida survived through the end of the war.

Ida was court-martialed for his part in the coup, but managed to convince the court that he had genuinely tried to undo his mistake through his attempt to convince Hatanaka to give up on the plot.

Post-war, he would be provisionally barred from public office. He would later become the head of the general affairs department for Dentsu, Japan's largest advertising agency. In 1955, he divorced and changed his name to Iwada.
