= Jirō Shiizaki =

Japanese army officer

- 椎崎 二郎
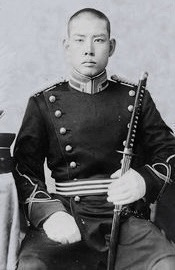
- Born: 30 September 1911; Empire of Japan
- Died: 15 August 1945 (aged 33); Empire of Japan
- Military career
- Allegiance: Empire of Japan
- Branch: Imperial Japanese Army
- Service years: ?–1945
- Rank: Lieutenant Colonel
- Conflicts: World War II; Kyūjō incident †

Jirō Shiizaki (椎崎 二郎, Shiizaki Jirō; 30 September 1911 – 15 August 1945) was a lieutenant colonel in the Imperial Japanese Army in World War II. He served as a member of the staff of the domestic affairs section of the Military Affairs Bureau's War Affairs Section. Shiizaki was one of several members of that staff to participate in a coup (the Kyūjō incident) in the early morning of 15 August 1945, the day the Emperor would declare Japan's surrender.

The coup was organized primarily by Major Kenji Hatanaka, and though quite a number of men were involved in the plot at one point or another, Shiizaki was one of the few to be involved in the climactic action; the rebels, with the help of the First Imperial Guard Division, seized the Imperial Palace, essentially held emperor Hirohito under house arrest, and sought to destroy the phonographic recordings which had been made of the emperor's surrender speech.

Around seven o'clock on the morning of August 15, the plot began to fall apart. General Shizuichi Tanaka, commander of the Eastern District Army, arrived at the Palace and harangued the conspirators on their duty to their country, and demanding that the dishonor brought by their treason could only be absolved through seppuku. Shiizaki, along with a number of others, committed ritual suicide that morning, on the grounds of the Imperial Palace.
