= Second Area Army =

- Active: July 4, 1942 - June 13, 1945
- Country: Empire of Japan
- Branch: Imperial Japanese Army
- Type: Infantry
- Role: Field Army
- Nickname(s): Ki (輝, Gleaming)

The Second Area Army (第2方面軍, Dai ni hōmen gun) was a field army of the Imperial Japanese Army during World War II.

== History ==
The Japanese 2nd Area Army was formed on July 4, 1942 under the control of the Kwantung Army as a reserve and garrison force to maintain security and public order in Manchukuo. It was disbanded on June 13, 1945, and its various components were reassigned to other commands.

The 2nd Area Army was transferred to the Davao in the Philippines in late 1943, and tasked with defending western New Guinea and the eastern part of the occupied Netherlands East Indies.

== List of Commanders ==
=== Commanding officer ===
	Name	From	To
1	General Korechika Anami	1 July 1942	26 December 1944
2	Lieutenant General Jo Iimura	26 December 1944	29 May 1945

=== Chief of Staff ===
	Name	From	To
1	Major General Kane Yoshihara	4 July 1942	9 November 1942
2	Major General Yo Watanabe	9 November 1942	29 October 1943
3	Lieutenant General Takazo Numata	29 October 1943	26 December 1944
4	Major General Ryozo Sakuma	26 December 1944	29 May 1945
