= Potsdam Declaration =

Allied call for the surrender of all of the armed forces of Japan during World War II

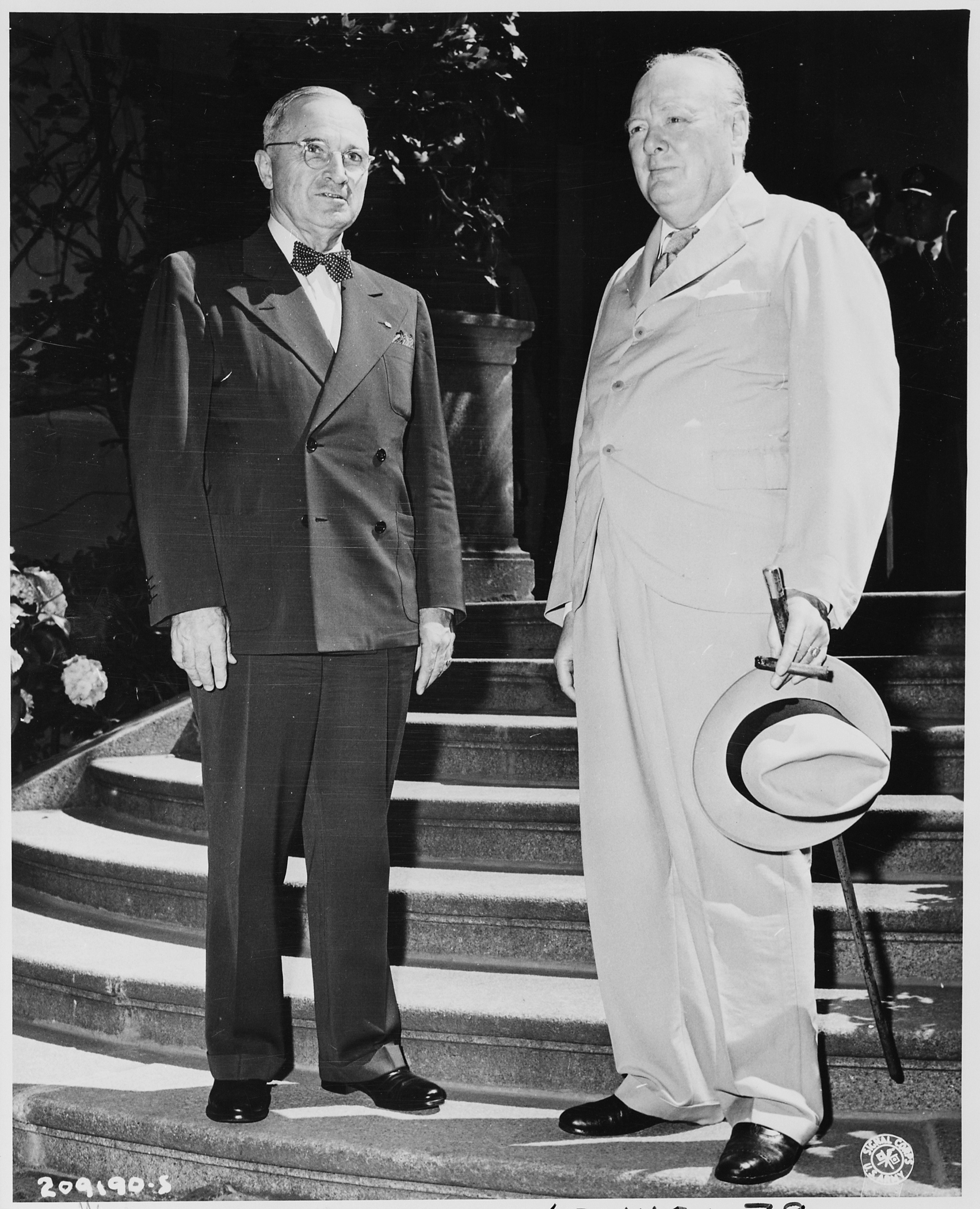
Harry S. Truman and Winston Churchill at "Little White House", Potsdam, Germany in July 1945

The Potsdam Declaration, or the Proclamation Defining Terms for Japanese Surrender, was a statement that called for the surrender of all Japanese armed forces during World War II. On July 26, 1945, United States president Harry S. Truman, United Kingdom prime minister Winston Churchill, and President of China Chiang Kai-shek issued the document, which outlined the terms of surrender for the Empire of Japan, as agreed upon at the Potsdam Conference. The ultimatum stated that, if Japan did not surrender, it would face "prompt and utter destruction."

== Drafting ==
At the start of the conference, the United States delegation considered a proclamation demanding Japan's unconditional surrender by the heads of governments of the United States, the United Kingdom, the Soviet Union and China. The Potsdam Declaration went through many drafts until a version acceptable to all was found. Soviet leader Joseph Stalin ultimately declined to endorse the ultimatum at Potsdam, since the Soviet Union was not yet at war with Japan, and instead committed to subscribing to the declaration upon Soviet entry in the war which was scheduled for early August.

Knowing on 24 July that the "Joint Chiefs of Staff had reached an agreement on ... military strategy", Truman gave Churchill a copy of the draft proclamation, which didn't mention the Soviet Union. The United States Delegation adopted all the suggested British amendments.

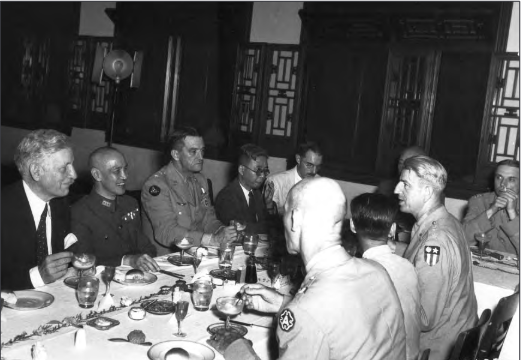
US ambassador, Patrick Hurley and Chiang Kai-Shek at a banquet in 1945 to honor General Chennault, on the right of the Generalissimo

Since Chiang Kai-shek had not been invited to the conference in a Berlin suburb, China did not participate in the drafting of the Potsdam Declaration. Chinese agreement on the issuance of the proposed proclamation was sought by telegram on 24 July. Ambassador Hurley delivered the message the next day in Chongqing. Chiang Kai-shek concurred with one amendment to the text, the listing of "President of the National Government of the Republic of China" before the Prime Minister of Great Britain, and the telegraphic reply sent from Chongqing at 11:05 a.m. on 26 July.

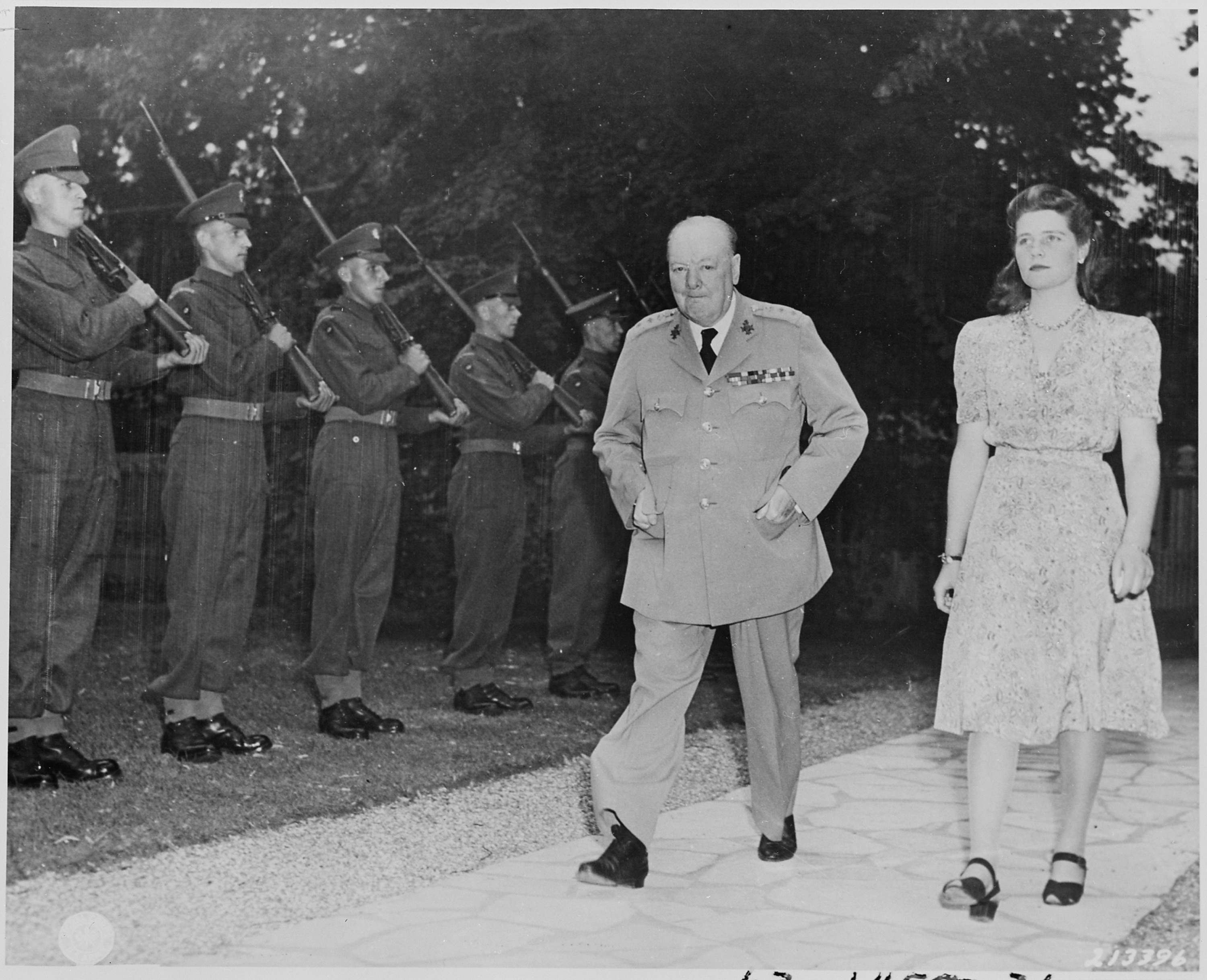
Winston Churchill with his daughter and aide-de-camp, Mary, at their residence in Potsdam, Germany in July 1945

Churchill had left the Berlin conference for the last time on 25 July, and that afternoon had flown to Northolt with his daughter and aide-de-camp Mary, to await the results of the British election at which he was unexpectedly defeated. Churchill was able to authorize the text as British Prime Minister, before submitting his resignation later on the evening of 26 July. In reality, the "signatures" of the Generalissimo and Prime Minister were in Truman's handwriting.

== Terms ==
On July 26, the United States, Britain, and China released the declaration announcing the terms for Japan's surrender, with the warning as an ultimatum: "We will not deviate from them. There are no alternatives. We shall brook no delay." For Japan, the terms of the declaration specified:

- The elimination "for all time of the authority and influence of those who have deceived and misled the people of Japan into embarking on world conquest"
- The occupation of "points in Japanese territory to be designated by the Allies"
- That "The terms of the Cairo Declaration shall be carried out and Japanese sovereignty shall be limited to the islands of Honshu, Hokkaido, Kyushu, Shikoku and such minor islands as we determine."
- That "the Japanese military forces, after being completely disarmed, shall be permitted to return to their homes with the opportunity to lead peaceful and productive lives"
- That "we do not intend that the Japanese shall be enslaved as a race or destroyed as a nation, but stern justice shall be meted out to all war criminals, including those who have visited cruelties upon our prisoners"

On the other hand, the declaration offered:

- "The Japanese Government shall remove all obstacles to the revival and strengthening of democratic tendencies among the Japanese people. Freedom of speech, of religion, and of thought, as well as respect for the fundamental human rights shall be established."
- "Japan shall be permitted to maintain such industries as will sustain her economy and permit the exaction of just reparations in kind, but not those which would enable her to rearm for war. To this end, access to, as distinguished from control of, raw materials shall be permitted. Eventual Japanese participation in world trade relations shall be permitted."
- "The occupying forces of the Allies shall be withdrawn from Japan as soon as these objectives have been accomplished and there has been established, in accordance with the freely expressed will of the Japanese people, a peacefully inclined and responsible government."

The mention of "unconditional surrender" came at the end of the declaration:

- "We call upon the government of Japan to proclaim now the unconditional surrender of all Japanese armed forces, and to provide proper and adequate assurances of their good faith in such action. The alternative for Japan is prompt and utter destruction."

Contrary to what had been intended at its conception, which was to disenfranchise the Japanese leadership so that the people would accept a mediated transition, the declaration made no direct mention of the Japanese emperor at all. However, it insisted that "the authority and influence of those who have deceived and misled the people of Japan into embarking on world conquest must be eliminated for all time." Allied intentions on issues of utmost importance to the Japanese, including the extent and number of Allied "occupation points," the fate of Japan's minor islands, and the extent to which the Allies planned to "control" Japan's "raw materials," as well as whether Hirohito was to be regarded as one of those who had "misled the people of Japan" or he might potentially become part of "a peacefully inclined and responsible government," were thus left unstated, which essentially made it a blank check for the Allies.

The "prompt and utter destruction" clause has been interpreted as a veiled warning about American possession of the atomic bomb, which had been successfully tested in New Mexico on July 16, 1945, the day before the opening of the conference. Although the document warned of further destruction like the Operation Meetinghouse raid on Tokyo and other carpetbombing of Japanese cities, it did not mention anything about the atomic bomb.

The Potsdam Declaration had terms unclearly stated. It is not clear from the document itself whether a Japanese government would remain under Allied occupation or the occupation would be run by a foreign military government. In the same manner, it was not clear whether after the end of the occupation, Japan was to include any territory other than the four main Japanese islands. However, State Department policy showed an intent to obtain a free hand in running the affairs of Japan afterwards.

=== Intentions of the Allied Powers ===
Each of the Allies who signed the Declaration had their own intentions for doing so, and all parties desired to receive reparations for war damages from the Japanese.

==== Republic of China ====
The Republic of China desired immediate withdrawal of the Imperial Japanese Army and its subsidiary force the Kwantung Army from all Chinese territory, including Manchuria. Until the very end of the war the Japanese Army had been campaigning in China to assert the rule of the Japanese colonial state there, and the Chinese Nationalists and Communists had been fighting in tandem to expel them from the country. The Potsdam Declaration was issued in part to make clear the Chinese expectation of complete Japanese withdrawal from China.

==== United Kingdom ====
The United Kingdom had lost control of its possessions in Southeast Asia and China to the Japanese advance in 1941–42. These included Singapore, Malaya, North Borneo, Hong Kong, and others. A key motivation of the British government was a restoration of control in its prewar possessions, along with a prompt end to the Japanese war effort, especially on the Indian front in Burma.

==== United States ====
The United States desired to keep maximum strategic latitude for itself upon the defeat of Japan. The American government had demanded in the past the unconditional surrender of Japan as the precondition to peace, and the text of the Declaration reiterated this demand. In the remainder of Asia, the American government had the goals of total rollback of the Empire of Japan's overseas possessions, as well as the additional goal of preventing the communists – with the support and patronage of the Soviet Union – from expanding influence in East Asia and Southeast Asia.

== Leaflets and radio broadcasts ==
The declaration was released to the press in Potsdam on the evening of July 26 and was simultaneously transmitted to the Office of War Information (OWI) in Washington. By 5:00 p.m. Washington time, OWI's West Coast transmitters, aimed at the Japanese home islands, were broadcasting the text in English, and two hours later they began broadcasting it in Japanese. The declaration was never transmitted to the Japanese government by diplomatic channels, one reason being that the State Department did not want the United States to be seen as suing for peace. The Japanese ambassador to Moscow reacted to the news by calling the declaration "a big scare-bomb directed against us". American bombers dropped over 3 million leaflets describing the declaration over Japan, despite the fact that picking up enemy propaganda leaflets and listening to foreign radio broadcasts was unlawful in Japan.

The initial English radio transmission was received in Japan by the Foreign Ministry, Dōmei News Agency, the Imperial Army, and the Imperial Navy. It was translated into Japanese by Takeso Shimoda of the Treaty Division of the Foreign Ministry. An internal discussion in the Foreign Ministry concluded that acceptance was unavoidable, but there was still room for negotiation. "Remaining silent is prudent; the news media should be instructed to print it without any comments."

== Aftermath ==
The Potsdam Declaration and consideration of adopting it occurred before nuclear weapons were used. The terms of the declaration were hotly debated within the Japanese government. Upon receiving the declaration, Foreign Minister Shigenori Tōgō hurriedly met with Prime Minister Kantarō Suzuki and Cabinet Secretary Hisatsune Sakomizu. Sakomizu recalled that all felt the declaration must be accepted. Despite being sympathetic to accepting the terms, Tōgō felt it was vague about the eventual form of government for Japan, disarmament, and the fate of accused war criminals. He also still had hope that the Soviet Union would agree to mediate negotiations with the Western Allies to obtain clarifications and revisions of the declaration's terms.

Shortly afterwards, Tōgō met with Emperor Hirohito and advised him to treat the declaration with the utmost circumspection, but that a reply should be postponed until the Japanese received a response from the Soviets to mediate peace. According to Foreign Ministry official Toshikazu Kase, Hirohito "said without hesitation that he deemed it [the declaration] acceptable in principle."

Meanwhile, the Supreme Council for the Direction of the War met the same day to discuss the declaration. War Minister Korechika Anami, General Yoshijirō Umezu, and Admiral Soemu Toyoda opposed accepting the declaration, argued that the terms were "too dishonorable," and advised for the Japanese government to reject it openly. Suzuki, Tōgō, and Admiral Mitsumasa Yonai leaned towards accepting it but agreed that clarification was needed over the status of the Emperor. Tōgō's suggestion for the government not to respond until it received the Soviet response was accepted.

Suzuki stated that the Japanese policy toward the declaration was one of mokusatsu (黙殺; lit. "killing with silence"), which the United States interpreted as meaning "rejection by ignoring." That led to a decision by the White House to carry out the threat of destruction. After the White House decision, the United States Army Air Forces dropped the first atomic bomb on the Japanese city of Hiroshima on August 6, 1945 and then the second atomic bomb on the Japanese city of Nagasaki on August 9, 1945. The bombings devastated the two cities, killing tens of thousands of people and destroying much of the cities' infrastructure as well as military bases and factories in a matter of seconds in a radius that stretched for more than 1 mile (1.6 kilometers).

However, the word mokusatsu can also mean "withholding comment." Since then, it has been alleged that the bombings of Hiroshima and Nagasaki were attributable to English translations of mokusatsu having misrepresented Suzuki as rejecting the terms of the Potsdam Declaration; however, this claim is not universally accepted.

On August 9, 1945, Soviet general secretary Joseph Stalin, based on a secret agreement at the Yalta Conference in February, unilaterally abrogated the 1941 Soviet–Japanese Neutrality Pact and declared war on Japan. Thus began the Soviet–Japanese War, with the Soviets invading Manchuria on three fronts. The previous day, 8 August, the Soviet Union had agreed to adhere to the Potsdam Declaration.

In a widely broadcast speech after the bombing of Hiroshima, which was picked up by Japanese news agencies, Truman warned that if Japan failed to accept the terms of the Potsdam Declaration, it could "expect a rain of ruin from the air, the like of which has never been seen on this earth." As a result, Suzuki felt compelled to meet the Japanese press, and he reiterated his government's commitment to ignore the Allies' demands and fight on.

However, soon after that statement, it became clear to many that surrender was a realistic option. The thoroughness of the Allies' demands and the fact they were made public forced the Japanese leaders and populace to realize the success that Japan's enemies had achieved in the war. After the receipt of the Potsdam Declaration, the Japanese government attempted to maintain the issue of the Emperor's administrative prerogative within the Potsdam Declaration by its surrender offer of August 10, but in the end, it had to take comfort with US Secretary of State James F. Byrnes' reply: "From the moment of surrender the authority of the Emperor and the Japanese Government to rule the state shall be subject to the Supreme Commander of the Allied powers who will take such steps as he deems proper to effectuate the surrender terms." Thus, at 1200 JST on August 15, 1945, the Emperor announced his acceptance of the Potsdam Declaration, which culminated in the surrender documents signature on board the USS Missouri on September 2, 1945. The radio announcement to the Japanese people was the first time many of them had actually heard the voice of the Emperor.

The Potsdam Declaration was intended from the start to serve as legal basis for handling Japan after the war. After the surrender of the Japanese government and the landing of General MacArthur in Japan in September 1945, the Potsdam Declaration served as the legal basis for the occupation's reforms, as stipulated in the Japanese Instrument of Surrender.

The People's Republic of China cites the Potsdam Declaration as one of the bases for the One-China Principle that Taiwan is part of China.

== Historical controversy ==
The Imperial Japanese Government, under the direction of prime minister Suzuki Kantarō, did not publicly entertain the possibility of surrender to the Allies. The historical controversy lies in whether or not the demand for an unconditional surrender of Japan stalled possible peace negotiations. If the demand for unconditional surrender had not been made, so the argument goes, there could be no argument for the necessity of the use of firebombing and nuclear weapons against Japan. This is the flashpoint around which much of historiographical controversy surrounding the Declaration revolves.

According to American historian Tsuyoshi Hasegawa the Japanese cabinet remained averse to surrender, and no governmental record immediately pursuant to the August 6, 1945, Little Boy nuclear detonation over Hiroshima indicates a shift toward capitulation under the terms of the Potsdam Declaration.

Hasegawa also notes that Stalin told Truman at the Potsdam Conference that the Soviet Union would begin war with Japan within the beginning of August, but that the Americans did not expect them to move until the end of the month.

== See also ==
- General Order No. 1 (August 1945)
- Pacific War (1941–1945)
- Second Sino-Japanese War (1937–1945)
- Treaty of San Francisco (1951)
