= Eastern District Army =

- Active: November 16, 1923 - November 30, 1945
- Country: Empire of Japan
- Branch: Imperial Japanese Army
- Type: Infantry
- Role: Regional command in the Japanese home islands
- Size: Field Army
- Engagements: World War II: Air raids on Japan

The Eastern District Army (東部軍, Tōbugun) was a field army of the Imperial Japanese Army responsible for the defense of the Kantō region and northern Honshū during the Pacific War. It was one of the regional commands in the Japanese home islands reporting to the General Defense Command.

== History ==
The Eastern District Army was established on 16 November 1923 in the aftermath of the Great Kantō earthquake as the Tokyo Defense Headquarters (東京警備司令部, Tokyo Keibi Shireibu). It was essentially a home guard and garrison, responsible for recruitment and civil defense training to ensure the security of Tokyo, Yokohama, and the surrounding areas.

On 1 August 1935, the Tokyo Defense Headquarters was renamed the Eastern Defense Command. On 1 August 1940, it was renamed again as the Eastern Army, which became the Eastern District Army on 1 February 1945.

The Eastern District Army existed concurrently with the Japanese 12th Area Army, which was tasked with organizing the final defenses of Tokyo against the expected American invasion of the Japanese home islands.

The Eastern District Army played an especially significant role in combating the 15 August 1945 attempted coup d'etat of Major Kenji Hatanaka, who sought to prevent the Emperor's announcement of Japan's surrender from being broadcast. At the time, the commander of the Eastern District Army was General Shizuichi Tanaka.

Support of the Eastern District Army was essential to Hatanaka's plan to take over the Imperial Palace, and so Hatanaka exhorted General Tanaka to aid him. Tanaka refused, and later told his men to ignore Strategic Order 584, forged by Hatanaka and ordering the Eastern District Army to seize and defend the Imperial Palace; in short, to aid in the coup. Rather than send in his men to defeat the rebels by force, Tanaka traveled to the Imperial Palace and spoke to Hatanaka and the other rebel leaders personally, haranguing them, and putting an end to the rebellion.

The Eastern District Army remained active for several months after the surrender of Japan to help maintain public order until the arrival of the American occupation forces, and to oversee the final demobilization and dissolution of the Imperial Japanese Army.

== Commanders ==
=== Commanding officer ===
| | Name | From | To |
|---|---|---|---|
| 1 | General Hanzo Yamanashi | 16 November 1923 | 20 August 1924 |
| 2 | General Shinnosuke Kikuchi | 20 August 1924 | 2 March 1926 |
| 3 | Field Marshal Nobuyoshi Muto | 2 March 1926 | 28 July 1926 |
| 4 | General Nen Isomura | 28 July 1926 | 10 August 1928 |
| 5 | General Shikitaro Kishimoto | 10 August 1928 | 1 August 1929 |
| 6 | Lieutenant General Naotoshi Hasegawa | 1 August 1929 | 22 December 1930 |
| 7 | Lieutenant General Yasakichi Hayashi | 22 December 1930 | 29 February 1932 |
| 8 | Lieutenant General Kiyoshi Kihara | 29 February 1932 | 18 March 1933 |
| 9 | Lieutenant General Noriyuki Hayashi | 18 March 1933 | 5 March 1934 |
| 10 | General Giichi Nishi | 5 March 1934 | 2 December 1935 |
| 11 | Lieutenant General Kohei Kashii | 2 December 1935 | 2 April 1936 |
| 12 | Lieutenant General Koichi Iwakoshi | 2 April 1936 | 2 August 1937 |
| 13 | General Kotaro Nakamura | 2 August 1937 | 23 June 1938 |
| 14 | Lieutenant General Bunzaburo Kawagishi | 23 June 1938 | 1 December 1939 |
| 15 | Lieutenant General Shiro Inaba | 1 December 1939 | 15 October 1941 |
| 16 | General Shizuichi Tanaka | 15 October 1941 | 24 December 1941 |
| 17 | General Kotaro Nakamura | 24 December 1941 | 1 May 1943 |
| 18 | General Kenji Doihara | 1 May 1943 | 22 March 1944 |
| 19 | General Keisuke Fujie | 22 March 1944 | 9 March 1945 |
| 20 | General Shizuichi Tanaka | 9 March 1945 | 22 August 1945 |
| 21 | General Kenji Doihara | 22 August 1945 | 23 September 1945 |
| 22 | General Kenzo Kitano | 23 September 1945 | 30 November 1945 |

=== Chief of Staff ===
| | Name | From | To |
|---|---|---|---|
| 1 | Lieutenant General Shinji Hata | 17 November 1923 | 2 March 1926 |
| 2 | Lieutenant General Yataka Nakaoka | 2 March 1926 | 20 May 1928 |
| 3 | Lieutenant General Okiie Usami | 30 May 1928 | 1 August 1929 |
| 4 | Lieutenant General Toranosuke Hashimoto | 1 August 1929 | 1 August 1931 |
| 5 | Major General Shozo Shima | 1 August 1931 | 18 March 1933 |
| 6 | Lieutenant General Kamezo Odaka | 18 March 1933 | 1 August 1935 |
| 7 | Lieutenant General Touji Yasui | 1 August 1935 | 2 August 1937 |
| 8 | General Teiichi Yoshimoto | 2 August 1937 | 20 June 1938 |
| 9 | Lieutenant General Ryotaro Nakai | 15 July 1938 | 9 March 1939 |
| 10 | Lieutenant General Takuma Nishimura | 9 March 1939 | 5 September 1940 |
| 11 | Lieutenant General Haruki Isayama | 5 September 1940 | 28 June 1941 |
| 12 | Major General Suguru Kitajima | 28 June 1941 | 29 September 1942 |
| 13 | Lieutenant General Eiichi Tatsumi | 30 September 1942 | 1 March 1945 |
| 14 | Major General Tatsuhiko Takashima | 1 March 1945 | 30 November 1945 |

== See also ==
- Kyūjō Incident
- Armies of the Imperial Japanese Army
