= Kenji Hatanaka =

Imperial Japanese Army officer & conspirator (1912–1945)

- 畑中 健二
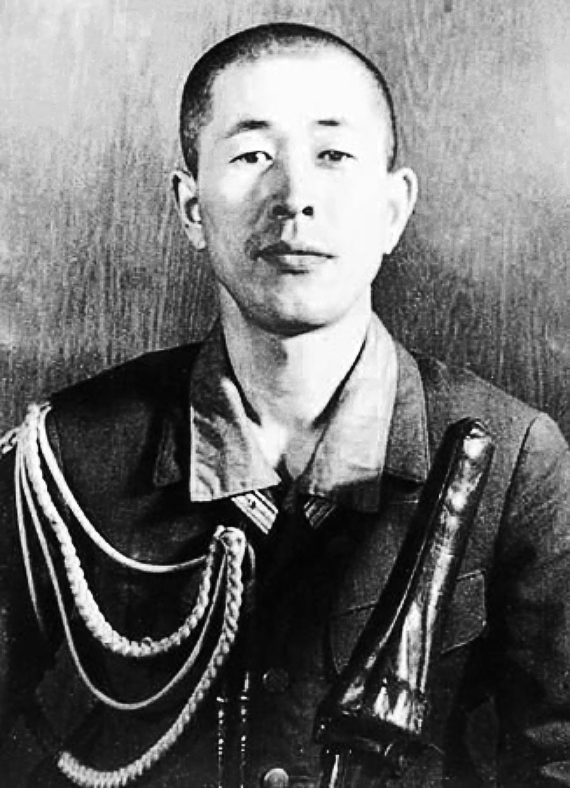
- Born: 28 March 1912; Kyoto, Japan
- Died: 15 August 1945 (aged 33); Tokyo, Japan
- Military career
- Allegiance: Empire of Japan
- Branch: Imperial Japanese Army
- Rank: Major
- Unit: Military Affairs Section (Ministry of War)
- Conflicts: World War II; Kyūjō incident ‡‡

Kenji Hatanaka (畑中 健二, Hatanaka Kenji; 28 March 1912 – 15 August 1945) was a major in the Imperial Japanese Army and one of the chief conspirators in the Kyūjō incident, a plot to seize the Imperial Palace and to prevent the broadcast of Emperor Hirohito's surrender speech announcing the end of World War II.

== Military career ==
Hatanaka served in the Military Affairs Section of the Japanese Ministry of War at the end of World War II. As one of the leaders of a group of Japanese officers determined to prevent the acceptance of the Potsdam Declaration and therefore the surrender of Japan, Hatanaka attempted a coup d'état on 14–15 August 1945. Failing to obtain the support of the War Minister, General Korechika Anami, Hatanaka organised a number of other officers and succeeded in occupying the Imperial Palace and Imperial Household Ministry.

Still needing high-level support for his cause, he tried to enlist Lieutenant General Takeshi Mori, commander of the 1st Imperial Guard Division. Mori was non-committal and a frustrated Hatanaka shot and killed him. Hatanaka and his men then spent several hours searching for the recording that had been made of the Emperor's speech announcing the surrender of Japan, and which was meant for public broadcast. When he failed to locate the recordings, he occupied the NHK Building in an attempt to prevent the speech from being broadcast. However, still without high level support and the recordings, Hatanaka abandoned his coup after receiving direct orders to do so from Eastern District Army Headquarters.

Following the failure of the coup, Hatanaka traveled to the plaza fronting the Imperial Palace. Along with his fellow conspirator, Lieutenant Colonel Jirō Shiizaki, he shot himself. In Hatanaka's pocket his short death poem was found:

Japanese text

今はただ
思ひ殘すこと
なかりけり
暗雲去りし
御世となりなば

Romanized Japanese

ima wa tada
omoinokosu koto
nakarikeri
an'un sarishi
mi-yo to narinaba

English translation

I have nothing to regret
now that the dark clouds have disappeared
from the reign of the Emperor.

== In popular culture ==
- In the 1967 film Japan's Longest Day, Hatanaka was portrayed by actor Toshio Kurosawa
- In the 2015 film The Emperor in August, Hatanaka was portrayed by actor Tori Matsuzaka

== Bibliography ==
- Hoyt, Edwin P. (1986), Japan's War: The Great Pacific Conflict, 1853–1952. McGraw-Hill.
- Toland, John (1970), The Rising Sun: The Decline and Fall of the Japanese Empire 1936 – 1945. Random House.
