= Kantarō Suzuki =

Japanese admiral, prime minister in 1945

Baron Kantarō Suzuki
- 鈴木 貫太郎
- Suzuki c. 1944

Prime Minister of Japan
- In office 7 April 1945 – 17 August 1945
- Monarch: Hirohito
- Preceded by: Kuniaki Koiso
- Succeeded by: Naruhiko Higashikuni

President of the Imperial Rule Assistance Association
- In office 7 April 1945 – 13 June 1945
- Deputy: Taketora Ogata
- Preceded by: Kuniaki Koiso
- Succeeded by: Position abolished
Additional positions
President of the Privy Council
In office 15 December 1945 – 13 June 1946
Monarch	Hirohito
Vice President	Shimizu Tōru
Preceded by	Hiranuma Kiichirō
Succeeded by	Shimizu Tōru
In office 10 August 1944 – 7 April 1945
Monarch	Hirohito
Vice President	Shimizu Tōru
Preceded by	Yoshimichi Hara
Succeeded by	Hiranuma Kiichirō
Minister for Foreign Affairs
In office 7 April 1945 – 9 April 1945
Prime Minister	Himself
Preceded by	Mamoru Shigemitsu
Succeeded by	Shigenori Tōgō
Minister of Greater East Asia
In office 7 April 1945 – 9 April 1945
Prime Minister	Himself
Preceded by	Mamoru Shigemitsu
Succeeded by	Shigenori Tōgō
Vice President of the Privy Council
In office 24 June 1940 – 10 August 1944
Monarch	Hirohito
President	Yoshimichi Hara
Preceded by	Yoshimichi Hara
Succeeded by	Shimizu Tōru
Grand Chamberlain to the Emperor
In office 22 January 1929 – 20 November 1936
Monarch	Hirohito
Preceded by	Chinda Sutemi
Succeeded by	Saburō Hyakutake

Member of the Privy Council
- In office 14 February 1929 – 24 June 1940
- Monarch: Hirohito

Personal details
- Born: 18 January 1868 Kuze, Izumi, Japan
- Died: 17 April 1948 (aged 80) Noda, Chiba, Japan
- Party: IRAA (1945)
- Other political affiliations: Independent
- Spouse: Taka Adachi (m. 1915)
- Children: Hajime Suzuki
- Relatives: Takao Suzuki (brother); Suguru Suzuki (nephew)
- Education: Imperial Japanese Naval Academy
- Profession: Admiral, politician
- Awards: Order of the Golden Kite (3rd class)

Military service
- Allegiance: Empire of Japan
- Branch/service: Imperial Japanese Navy
- Years of service: 1887–1929
- Rank: Admiral
- Commands: Akashi, Soya, Shikishima, Tsukuba; Maizuru Naval District, IJN 2nd Fleet, IJN 3rd Fleet, Kure Naval District, Combined Fleet
- Battles/wars: First Sino-Japanese War; Battle of Weihaiwei; Russo-Japanese War; Battle of Port Arthur; Battle of Tsushima; World War I; World War II

Baron Kantarō Suzuki (鈴木 貫太郎, Suzuki Kantarō; 18 January 1868 – 17 April 1948) was a Japanese politician and admiral who served as prime minister of Japan from 7 April to 17 August 1945, during World War II. He was prime minister at the time of Japan's surrender on 15 August.

Born in Osaka, Suzuki graduated from the Naval Academy and Staff College and served in the First Sino-Japanese and Russo-Japanese Wars. He was promoted to full admiral in 1923 and served as chief of the naval general staff from 1925 to 1929. In 1945, Suzuki was appointed prime minister shortly after the start of the Battle of Okinawa and the resignation of prime minister Kuniaki Koiso. After the Potsdam Declaration by the Allies on 26 July, which called for Japan's unconditional surrender, Suzuki dismissed it with the word mokusatsu. On 14 August, Suzuki attended the conference at which emperor Hirohito made the decision to surrender over his divided cabinet. Japan surrendered the next day, and Suzuki resigned on 17 August.

== Early life ==
Suzuki was born on 18 January 1868, in Izumi Province (present-day Sakai, Osaka), the first son of local governor (daikan) of Sekiyado Domain Suzuki Yoshinori. He grew up in the city of Sekiyado, Shimōsa Province (present-day Noda, Chiba Prefecture).

== Naval career ==
Suzuki entered the 14th class of the Imperial Japanese Naval Academy in 1884, graduating 13th of 45 cadets in 1887. Suzuki served on the corvettes Tsukuba, Tenryū and cruiser Takachiho as a midshipman. On being commissioned as ensign, he served on the corvette Amagi, cruiser Takao, corvette Jingei, ironclad Kongō, and gunboat Maya. After his promotion to lieutenant on 21 December 1892, he served as chief navigator on the corvettes Kaimon, Hiei, and Kongō.

Suzuki served in the First Sino-Japanese War, commanding a torpedo boat and participated in a night torpedo assault in the Battle of Weihaiwei in 1895. Afterwards, he was promoted to lieutenant commander on 28 June 1898 after graduation from the Naval Staff College and assigned to a number of staff positions including that of naval attaché to Germany from 1901 to 1903. On his return, he was promoted to commander on 26 September 1903. He came to be known as the leading torpedo warfare expert in the Imperial Japanese Navy.

During the Russo-Japanese War, Suzuki commanded Destroyer Division 2 in 1904, which picked up survivors of the Port Arthur Blockade Squadron during the Battle of Port Arthur. He was appointed executive officer of the cruiser Kasuga on 26 February 1904, aboard which he participated in the Battle of the Yellow Sea. During the pivotal Battle of Tsushima, Suzuki was commander of Destroyer Division 4 under the IJN 2nd Fleet, which assisted in sinking the Russian battleship Navarin.

After the war, Suzuki was promoted to captain on 28 September 1907 and commanded the destroyer Akashi (1908), followed by the cruiser Soya (1909), battleship Shikishima (1911) and cruiser Tsukuba (1912). Promoted to rear admiral on 23 May 1913 and assigned to command the Maizuru Naval District. Suzuki became Vice Minister of the Navy from 1914 to 1917, during World War I. Promoted to vice admiral on 1 June 1917, he brought the cruisers Asama and Iwate to San Francisco in early 1918 with 1,000 cadets, and was received by U.S. Navy Rear Admiral William Fullam. The Japanese cruisers then proceeded to South America.

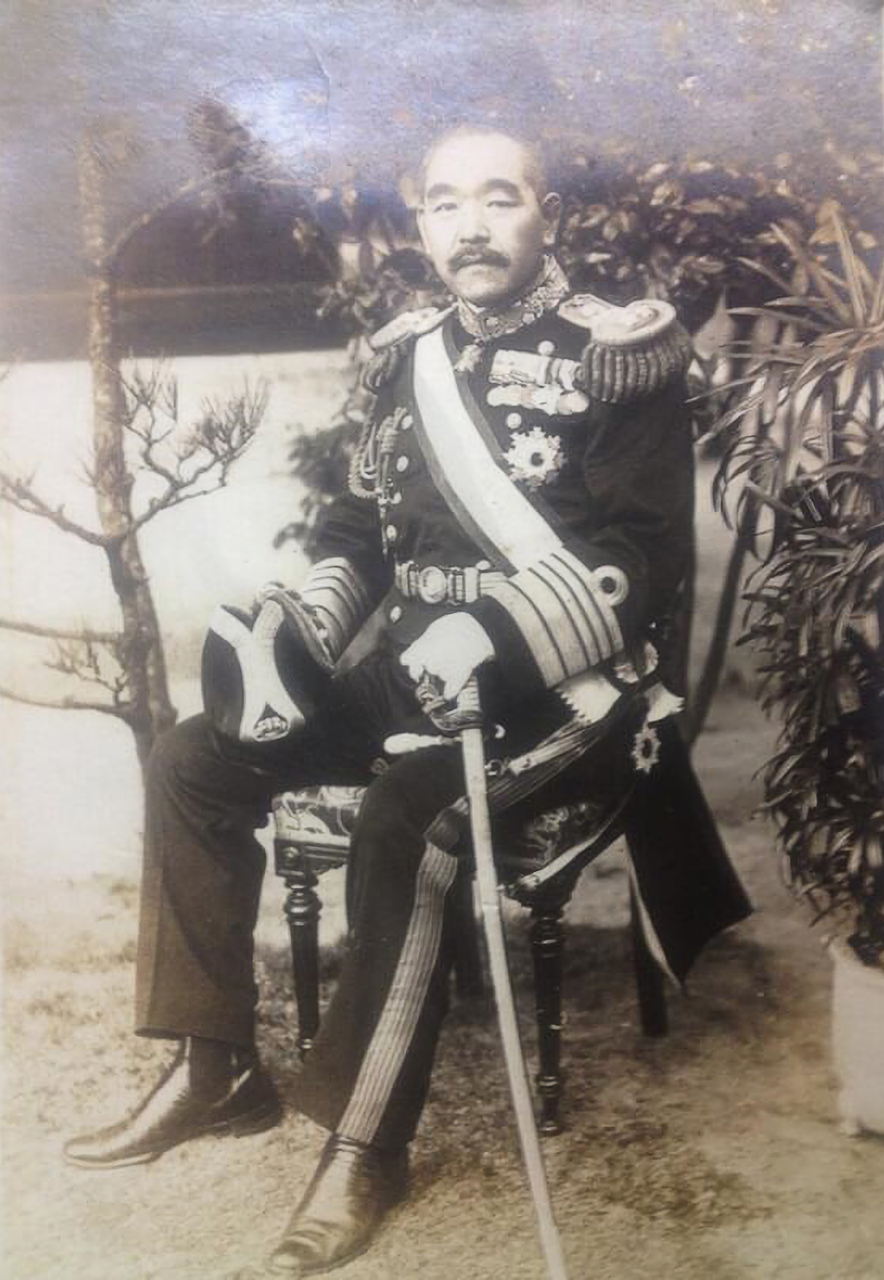
Kantaro became full Admiral in 1923

After stints as Commandant of the Imperial Japanese Naval Academy, Commander of the IJN 2nd Fleet, then the IJN 3rd Fleet, then Kure Naval District, he became a full admiral on 3 August 1923. Suzuki became Commander in Chief of Combined Fleet in 1924. After serving as Chief of Imperial Japanese Navy General Staff from 15 April 1925 to 22 January 1929, he retired and accepted the position as Privy Councillor and Grand Chamberlain from 1929 to 1936.

Suzuki narrowly escaped assassination in the February 26 Incident in 1936; the would-be assassin's bullet remained inside his body for the rest of his life, and was only revealed upon his cremation. Suzuki was opposed to Japan's war with the United States, before and throughout World War II.

== Premiership (1945) ==
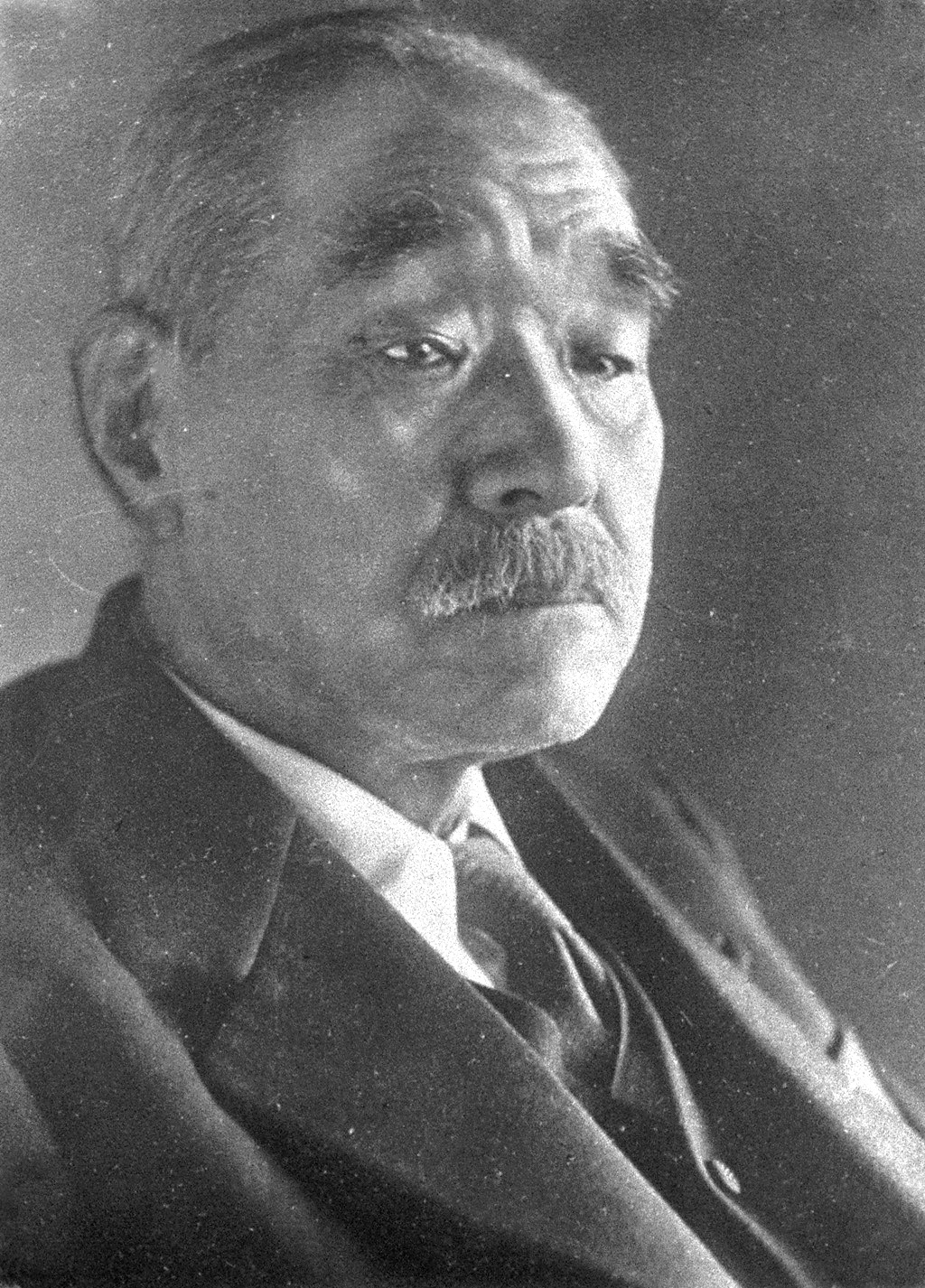
- Suzuki in 1945
- Premiership of Kantarō Suzuki; 7 April 1945 – 17 August 1945
- Monarch: Emperor Shōwa
- Cabinet: Kantarō Suzuki Cabinet
- Party: Imperial Rule Assistance Association (Apr–Jun 1945); Independent (Jun–Aug 1945)
- Seat: Naikaku Sōri Daijin Kantei
- Emblem of the Government of Japan

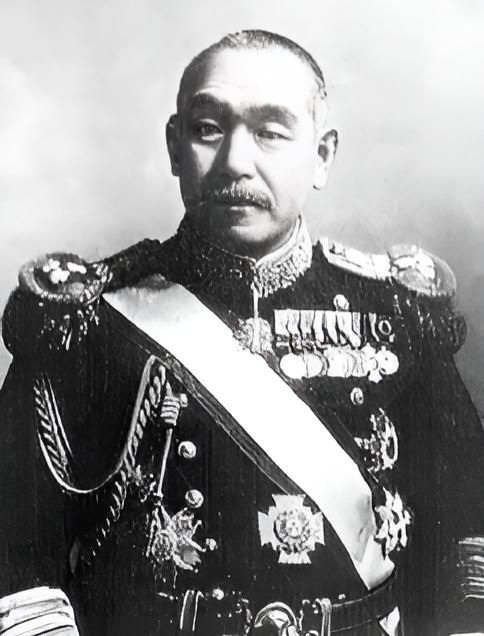
Suzuki wearing his naval uniform and medals

On 7 April 1945, Prime Minister Kuniaki Koiso resigned and Suzuki was appointed to take his place at the age of seventy-seven. He simultaneously held the portfolios for Minister for Foreign Affairs and for Greater East Asia.

Prime Minister Suzuki contributed to the final peace negotiations with the Allied Powers in World War II. He was involved in calling two unprecedented imperial conferences which helped resolve the split within the Japanese Imperial Cabinet over the Potsdam Declaration. He outlined the terms to emperor Hirohito who had already agreed to accept unconditional surrender. This went strongly against the military faction of the cabinet, who desired to continue the war in hopes of negotiating a more favorable peace agreement. Part of this faction attempted to assassinate Suzuki twice in the Kyūjō Incident on the morning of 15 August 1945.

After the surrender of Japan became public, Suzuki resigned and Prince Higashikuni became the next prime minister. Suzuki was the Chairman of the Privy Council from 7 August 1944 to 7 June 1945 and again after the surrender of Japan from 15 December 1945 to 13 June 1946.

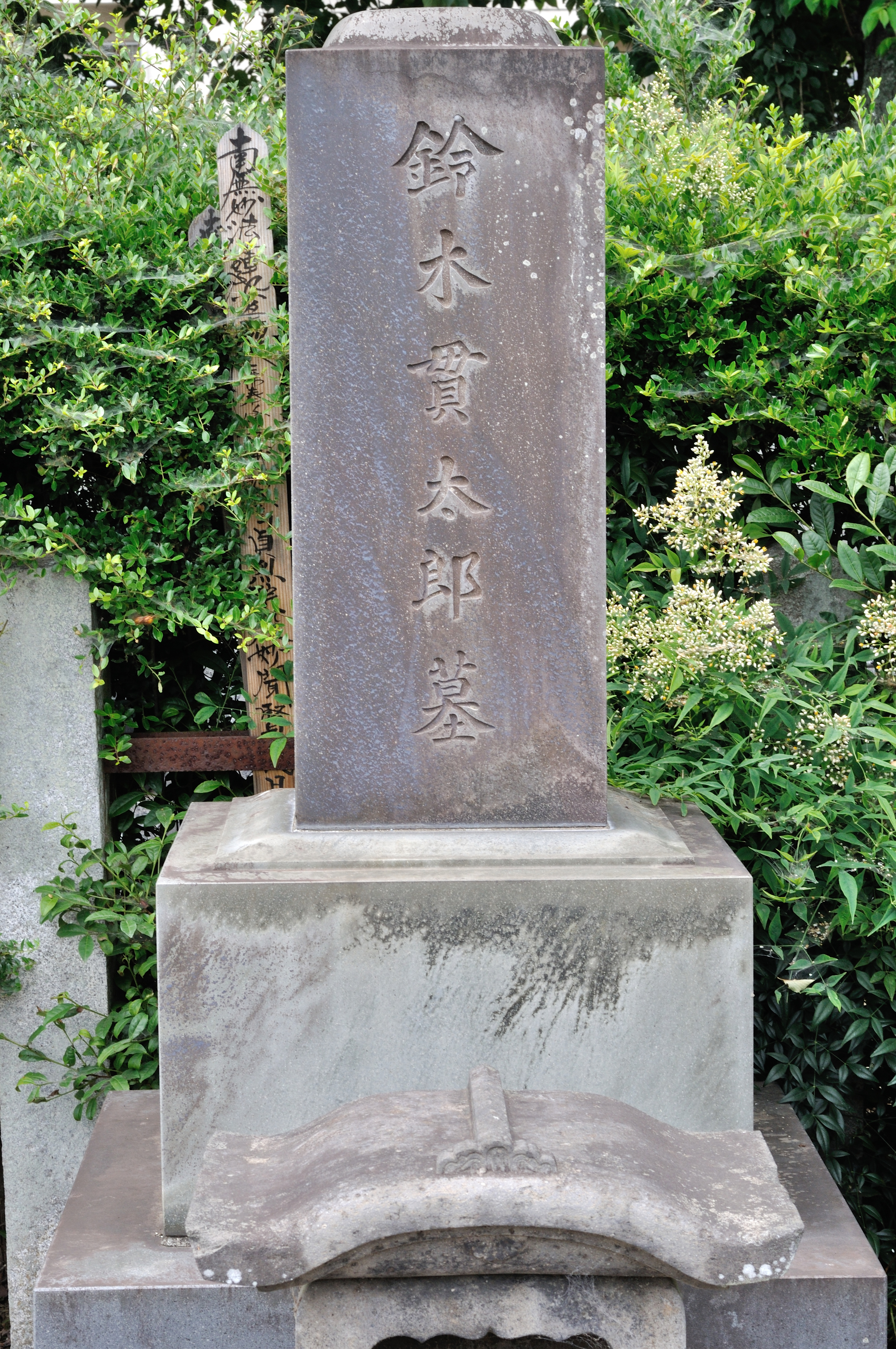
Grave of Kantarō Suzuki

Suzuki died of cancer on 17 April 1948. His grave is in his home town of Noda, Chiba. One of his two sons became director of Japan's immigration service, while the other was a successful lawyer.

== Honours ==
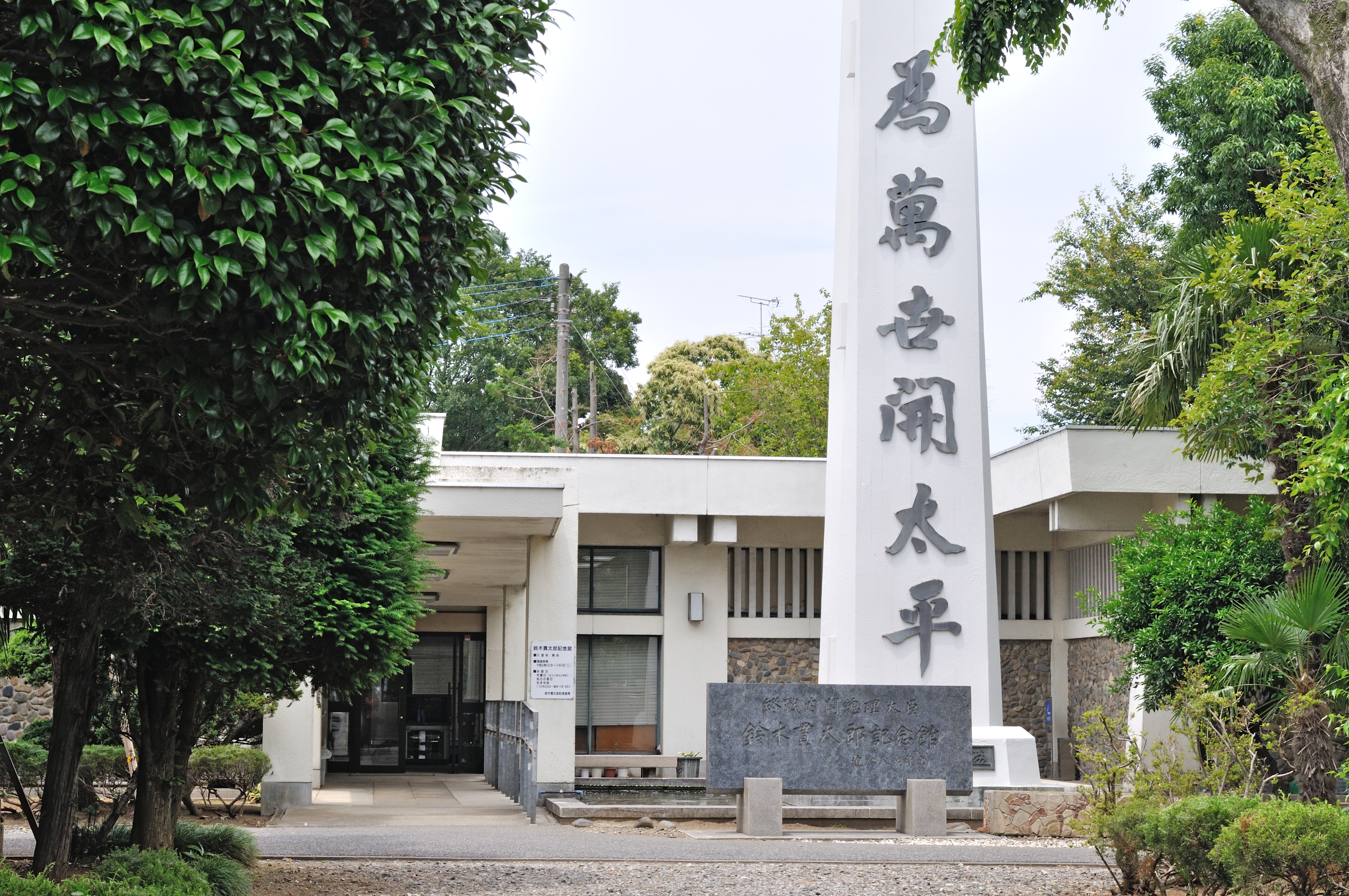
Museum of Kantaro Suzuki

From the corresponding Japanese Wikipedia article

=== Peerages ===
- Baron (20 November 1936)

=== Decorations ===
- Order of the Sacred Treasure, 2nd Class (28 August 1915; Fourth Class: 30 May 1905; Fifth Class: 30 November 1901; Sixth Class: 18 November 1895)
- Order of the Golden Kite, 3rd Class (1 April 1906; Fifth Class: 18 November 1895)
- Grand Cordon of the Order of the Rising Sun (1 April 1916; Second Class: 19 January 1916; Third Class: 1 April 1906)
- Grand Cordon of the Order of the Paulownia Flowers (April 29, 1934)

Political offices
Preceded by Takarabe Takeshi	Vice-Minister of the Navy; 17 April 1914 - 1 September 1917	Succeeded by Tochinai Sōjirō
Military offices
Preceded by Prince Fushimi Hiroyasu	2nd Fleet; Commander-in-chief; 1 December 1920 – 1 December 1921	Fleet dissolved, post next held by Naoe Nakano
Preceded by Oguri Kozaburō	3rd Fleet; Commander-in-chief; 1 December 1921 - 27 July 1922	Succeeded by Naoe Nakano
Preceded by Murakami Kakuichi	Kure Naval District; Commander-in-chief; 27 July 1922 - 27 January 1924	Succeeded by Takeshita Isamu
Preceded by Takeshita Isamu	Combined Fleet & 1st Fleet; Commander-in-chief; 27 January 1924 – 1 December 1924	Succeeded by Okada Keisuke
Preceded by Yamashita Gentarō	Navy General Staff; Chairman; 15 April 1925 – 22 January 1929	Succeeded by Katō Hiroharu
Political offices
Preceded by Sutemi Chinda	Grand Chamberlain; 22 January 1929 – 26 February 1936	Succeeded by Saburō Hyakutake
Preceded by Yoshimichi Hara	Chair of the Privy Council; 10 August 1944 – 7 April 1945	Succeeded by Kiichirō Hiranuma
Preceded by Kuniaki Koiso	Prime Minister; 7 April 1945 – 17 August 1945	Succeeded by Naruhiko Higashikuni
Preceded by Mamoru Shigemitsu	Minister for Foreign Affairs; 7 April 1945 – 9 April 1945	Succeeded by Shigenori Tōgō
Preceded by Mamoru Shigemitsu	Minister for Greater East Asia; 7 April 1945 – 9 April 1945	Succeeded by Shigenori Tōgō
Preceded by Kiichirō Hiranuma	Chair of the Privy Council; 15 December 1945 – 13 June 1946	Succeeded by Shimizu Tōru
