= Korechika Anami =

Japanese general (1887–1945)

- 阿南 惟幾
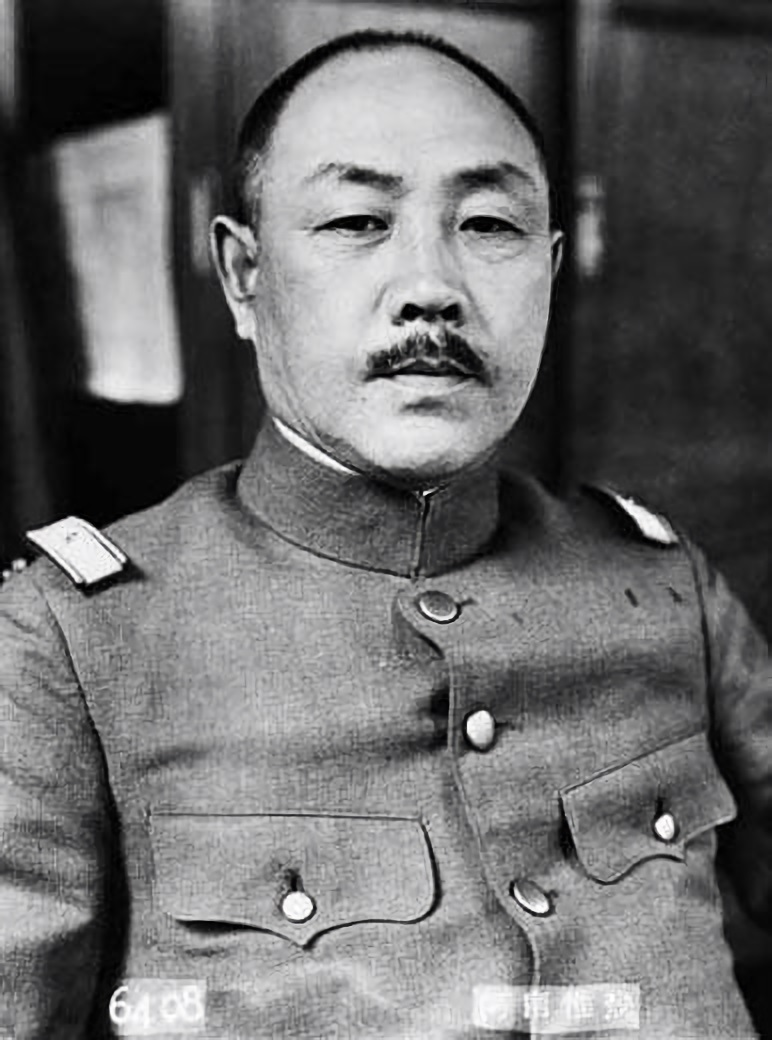

Minister of the Army
- In office 7 April 1945 – 15 August 1945
- Prime Minister: Kantarō Suzuki
- Preceded by: Hajime Sugiyama
- Succeeded by: Prince Naruhiko Higashikuni

Member of the Supreme War Council
- In office 26 December 1944 – 7 April 1945
- Monarch: Hirohito

Personal details
- Born: 21 February 1887 Taketa, Ōita, Japan
- Died: 15 August 1945 (aged 58) Chiyoda, Tokyo, Japan
- Resting place: Tama Cemetery
- Nickname: Anan

Military service
- Allegiance: Empire of Japan
- Branch/service: Imperial Japanese Army
- Years of service: 1906–1945
- Rank: General
- Commands: 109th Division, Eleventh Army, Second Area Army
- Battles/wars: Second Sino-Japanese War; World War II; Pacific War
- Cause of death: Committed Seppuku to avoid capture

Korechika Anami (阿南 惟幾, Anami Korechika; 21 February 1887 – 15 August 1945) was a general in the Imperial Japanese Army during World War II who was War Minister during the surrender of Japan.

== Early life and career ==
Anami was born in Taketa city in Ōita Prefecture, where his father was a senior bureaucrat in the Home Ministry, and grew up in Tokyo and in Tokushima Prefecture. He attended the 18th class of the Imperial Japanese Army Academy and was commissioned as a second lieutenant in the Infantry in December 1906.

In November 1918, Anami graduated from the 30th class of the Army Staff College with the rank of captain. He was assigned to the Imperial Japanese Army General Staff from April 1919 and was promoted to major in February 1922. From August 1923 to May 1925, he was assigned to the staff of the Sakhalin Expeditionary Army, which was responsible for the occupation of northern Sakhalin island during the Japanese intervention in Siberia. Anami was promoted to lieutenant colonel in August 1925.

From August to December 1925, Anami was sent as a military attaché to France. On his return to Japan, he was assigned to the 45th Infantry Regiment, and became unit commander in August 1928.

From August 1929 to August 1930, Anami served as Aide-de-camp to emperor Hirohito. He was then promoted to colonel.

From August 1933 to August 1934, Anami served as regimental commander of the 2nd Guard Regiment of the Imperial Guards. He was subsequently Commandant of the Tokyo Military Preparatory School, and promoted to major general in March 1935.

== Wartime military career ==
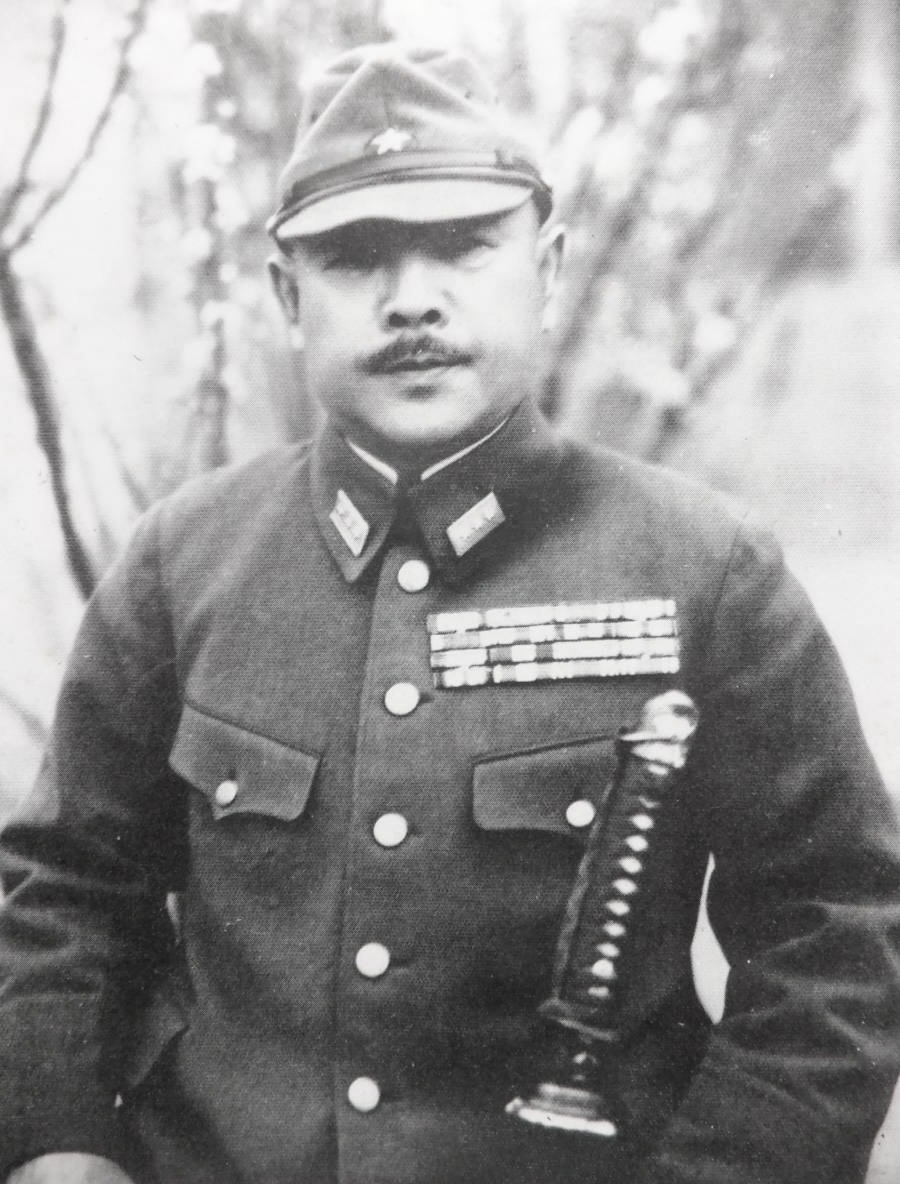
General Anami in 1944.

From August 1936, Anami served as Chief of the Military Administration Bureau of the War Ministry. He became Chief of the Personnel Bureau in March 1937 and was promoted to lieutenant general in March the following year.

With the start of the Second Sino-Japanese War, Anami was given a combat command, as commanding officer of the 109th Division in China from November 1938. He was recalled to Japan in October 1939 to assume the role of Vice-Minister of War in the cabinet of Prime Minister Fumimaro Konoe. Anami belonged to the clique which supported the rise of Hideki Tojo to power in October 1941.

However, in April 1941, Anami returned to China as Commander in Chief of the 11th Army, covering ongoing operations in central China. In later 1941 and early 1942 he led the unsuccessful Battle of Changsha. He was transferred to the Japanese Second Area Army in Manchukuo in July 1942.

In May 1943, Anami was promoted to full general. As the war conditions in the Pacific deteriorated for the Japanese, the Second Area Army was reassigned to the Southern Theater from November 1943, where Anami directed operations in western New Guinea and Halmahera.

Anami was recalled to Japan December 1944 and became Inspector General of Army Aviation and Chief of the Army Aeronautical Department and concurrently served on the Supreme War Council. In April 1945, he was appointed War Minister in the cabinet of Prime Minister Kantarō Suzuki.

== Political career ==
I am convinced that the Americans had only one bomb, after all.

— Korechika Anami, immediately after the drop of the atomic bomb Little Boy over Hiroshima

As War Minister, Anami was outspoken against the idea of surrender, despite his awareness that Japan's losses on the battlefield and the destruction of Japan's cities and industrial capability by American bombing meant that Japan had lost the war militarily. Even after the bombings of Hiroshima and Nagasaki, Anami opposed acceptance of the Potsdam Declaration and instead called for a large-scale battle to be fought on the Japanese mainland that would cause such massive Allied casualties that Japan would somehow be able to avoid complete surrender and perhaps even keep some of what it had conquered.

Eventually, his arguments against what he perceived to be the dishonor of surrender were overcome when Emperor Hirohito ordered an end to the war. Anami's supporters suggested that he should vote against surrender or resign from the Cabinet. Instead, he ordered his officers to concede and later said to his brother-in-law, "As a Japanese soldier, I must obey my Emperor."

He informed the officers of the War Ministry of the decision and that as it was an imperial command, they must obey. His refusal to support any action against the imperial decision was a key point in the failure of the Kyūjō incident, an attempted military coup d'état by junior officers to prevent the surrender announcement from being broadcast.

Death portrait of Korechika Anami

On 14 August, Anami signed the surrender document with the rest of the cabinet and committed seppuku early the next morning. His suicide note read, "I—with my death—humbly apologize [to the Emperor] for the great crime" (一死以て大罪を謝し奉る). The cryptic note is open to multiple interpretations.

Anami's grave is at Tama Cemetery, in Fuchū, Tokyo. His sword, blood-splattered dress uniform, and suicide note are on display at the Yūshūkan Museum, next to Yasukuni Shrine, in Tokyo.

== Family ==
Anami's youngest son Koreshige Anami served as Japan's ambassador to China from 2001 to 2006.

== See also ==
- Japan's Longest Day

Political offices
Preceded by Hajime Sugiyama	Army Minister; April–August 1945	Succeeded by Higashikuni Naruhiko
Military offices
Preceded by Waichirō Sonobe	Commander IJA 11th Army; April 1941 – July 1942	Succeeded by Osamu Tsukada
Preceded by none	Commander IJA 2nd Area Army; July 1942 – December 1944	Succeeded by Jo Iimura
