= Surrender of Japan =

End of World War II

Coordinates: 35°21′17″N 139°45′36″E

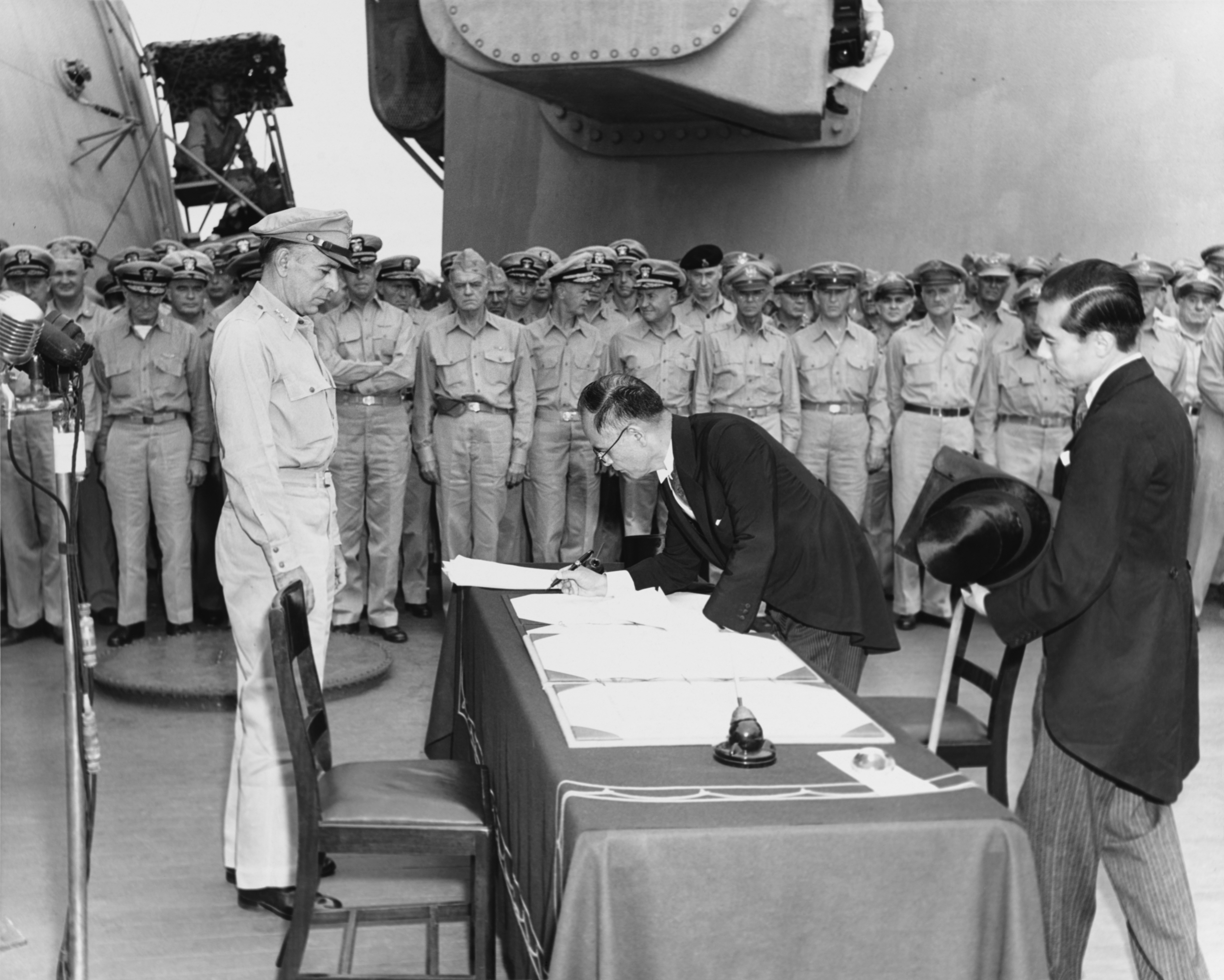
Japanese foreign affairs minister Mamoru Shigemitsu signs the Japanese Instrument of Surrender aboard USS Missouri as American General Richard K. Sutherland watches, 2 September 1945

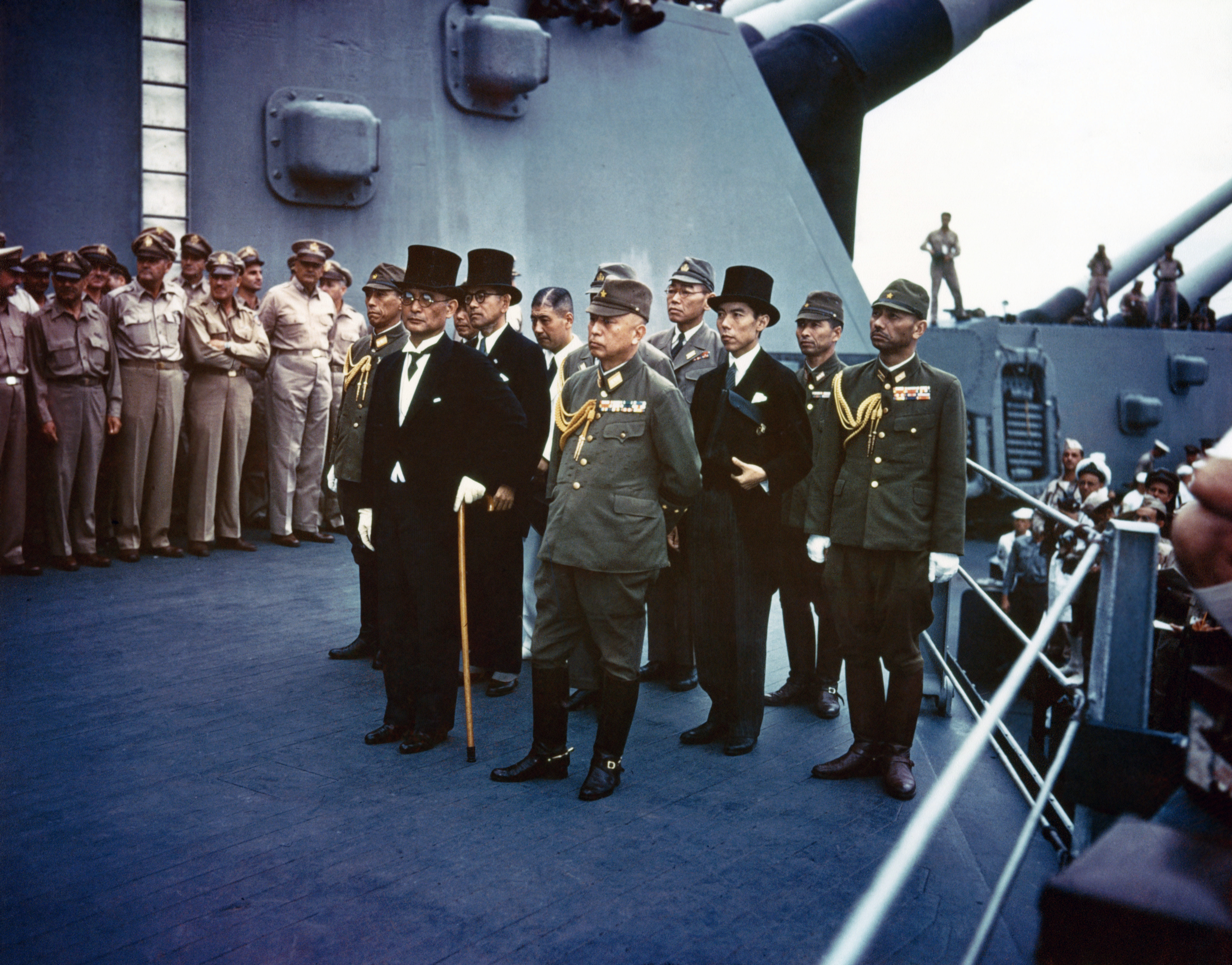
Representatives of the Empire of Japan stand aboard USS Missouri prior to signing of the Instrument of Surrender

The surrender of the Empire of Japan in World War II was announced by Emperor Hirohito on 15 August and formally signed on 2 September 1945, ending the war. By the end of July 1945, the Imperial Japanese Navy (IJN) was incapable of conducting major operations and an Allied invasion of Japan was imminent. Together with the United Kingdom and China, the United States called for the unconditional surrender of Japan in the Potsdam Declaration on 26 July 1945—the alternative being "prompt and utter destruction".

While publicly stating their intent to fight on to the bitter end, Japan's leaders (the Supreme Council for the Direction of the War, also known as the "Big Six") were privately making entreaties to the publicly neutral Soviet Union to mediate peace on terms more favorable to the Japanese. While maintaining a sufficient level of diplomatic engagement with the Japanese to give them the impression they might be willing to mediate, the Soviets were covertly preparing to attack Japanese forces in Manchuria and Korea (in addition to South Sakhalin and the Kuril Islands) in fulfillment of promises they had secretly made to the US and the UK at the Tehran and Yalta Conferences.

On 6 August 1945, at 8:15 am local time, the United States detonated an atomic bomb over the Japanese city of Hiroshima. Sixteen hours later, American president Harry S. Truman called again for Japan's surrender, warning them to "expect a rain of ruin from the air, the like of which has never been seen on this earth." Late on 8 August 1945, in accordance with the Yalta agreements, but in violation of the Soviet–Japanese Neutrality Pact, the Soviet Union declared war on Japan, and soon after midnight on 9 August 1945, the Soviet Union invaded the Japanese puppet state of Manchuria. Hours later, the U.S. dropped a second atomic bomb on the Japanese city of Nagasaki.

Emperor Hirohito subsequently ordered the Supreme Council for the Direction of the War to accept the terms the Allies had set down in the Potsdam Declaration. After several more days of behind-the-scenes negotiations and a failed coup d'état by hardliners in the Japanese military, Emperor Hirohito gave a recorded radio address across the Empire on 15 August announcing the surrender of Japan to the Allies.

On 28 August, the occupation of Japan began, led by the Supreme Commander for the Allied Powers. The formal surrender ceremony was held on 2 September, aboard the U.S. Navy battleship USS Missouri, at which officials from the Japanese government signed the Japanese Instrument of Surrender, ending hostilities with the Allies. Allied civilians and military personnel alike celebrated V-J Day, the end of the war in the Pacific; however, isolated soldiers and other personnel from Japan's forces scattered throughout Asia and the Pacific refused to surrender for months and years afterwards, some into the 1970s. The role of the atomic bombings in Japan's unconditional surrender, and the ethics of the two attacks, is debated. The state of war formally ended when the Treaty of San Francisco came into force on 28 April 1952. Four years later, Japan and the Soviet Union signed the Soviet–Japanese Joint Declaration of 1956, formally ending their state of war.

== Background ==
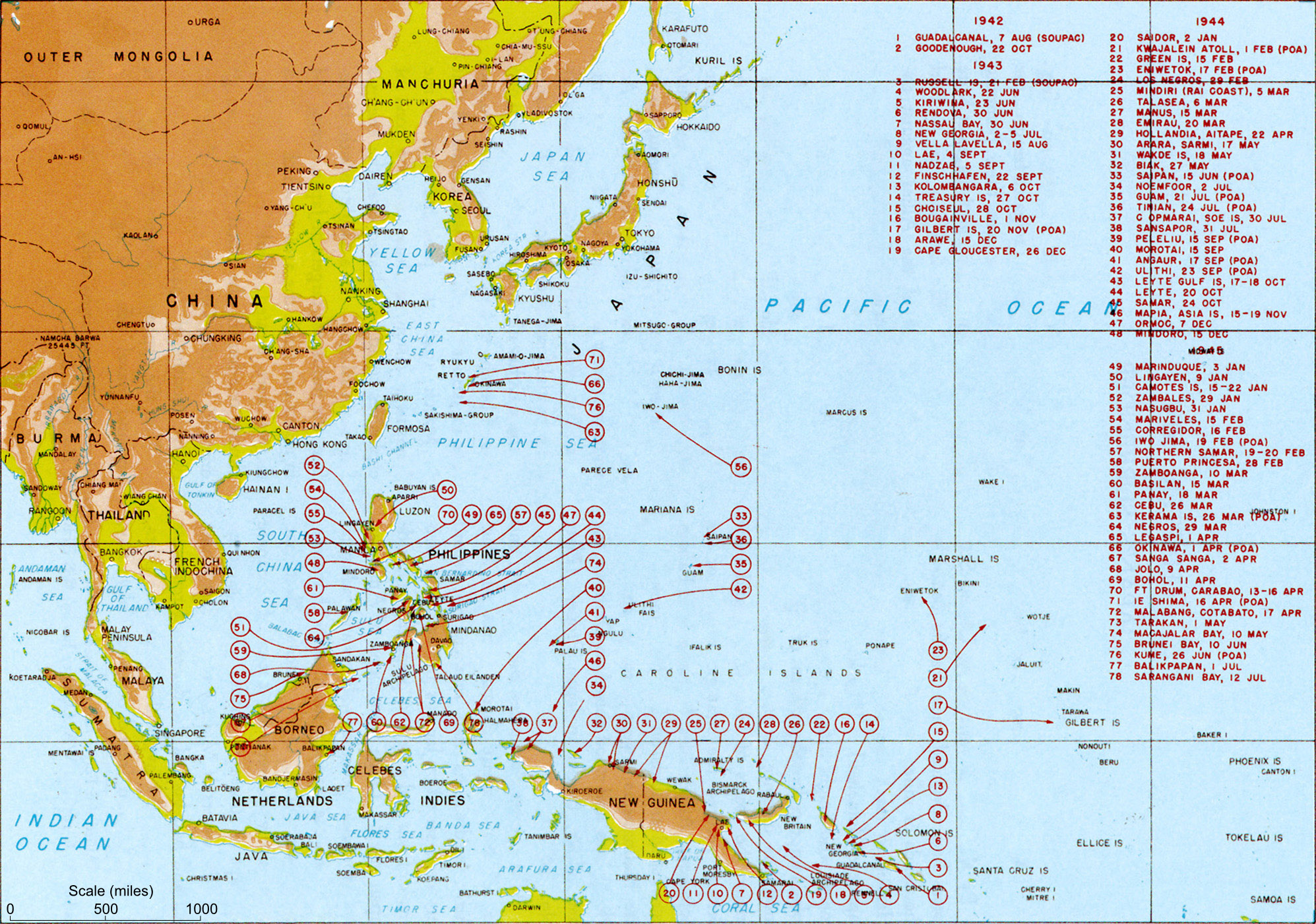
Allied landings in the Pacific Theatre of operations, August 1942 to August 1945

By 1945, the Japanese had suffered a string of defeats for nearly two years in the South West Pacific, India, the Marianas campaign, and the Philippines campaign. In July 1944, following the loss of Saipan, General Hideki Tōjō was replaced as prime minister by General Kuniaki Koiso, who declared that the Philippines would be the site of the decisive battle. After the Japanese loss of the Philippines, Koiso in turn was replaced by Admiral Kantarō Suzuki. The Allies captured the nearby islands of Iwo Jima and Okinawa in the first half of 1945. Okinawa was to be a staging area for Operation Downfall, the Allied invasion of the Japanese Home Islands. Following Germany's defeat, the Soviet Union began quietly redeploying its battle-hardened forces from the European theatre to the Far East, in addition to about forty divisions that had been stationed there since 1941, as a counterbalance to the million-strong Kwantung Army.

The Allied submarine campaign and the mining of Japanese coastal waters had largely destroyed the Japanese merchant fleet. With few natural resources, Japan was dependent on raw materials, particularly oil, imported from Manchuria and other parts of the East Asian mainland, and from the conquered territory in the Dutch East Indies. The destruction of the Japanese merchant fleet, combined with the strategic bombing of Japanese industry, had wrecked Japan's war economy. Production of coal, iron, steel, rubber, and other vital supplies was only a fraction of that before the war.

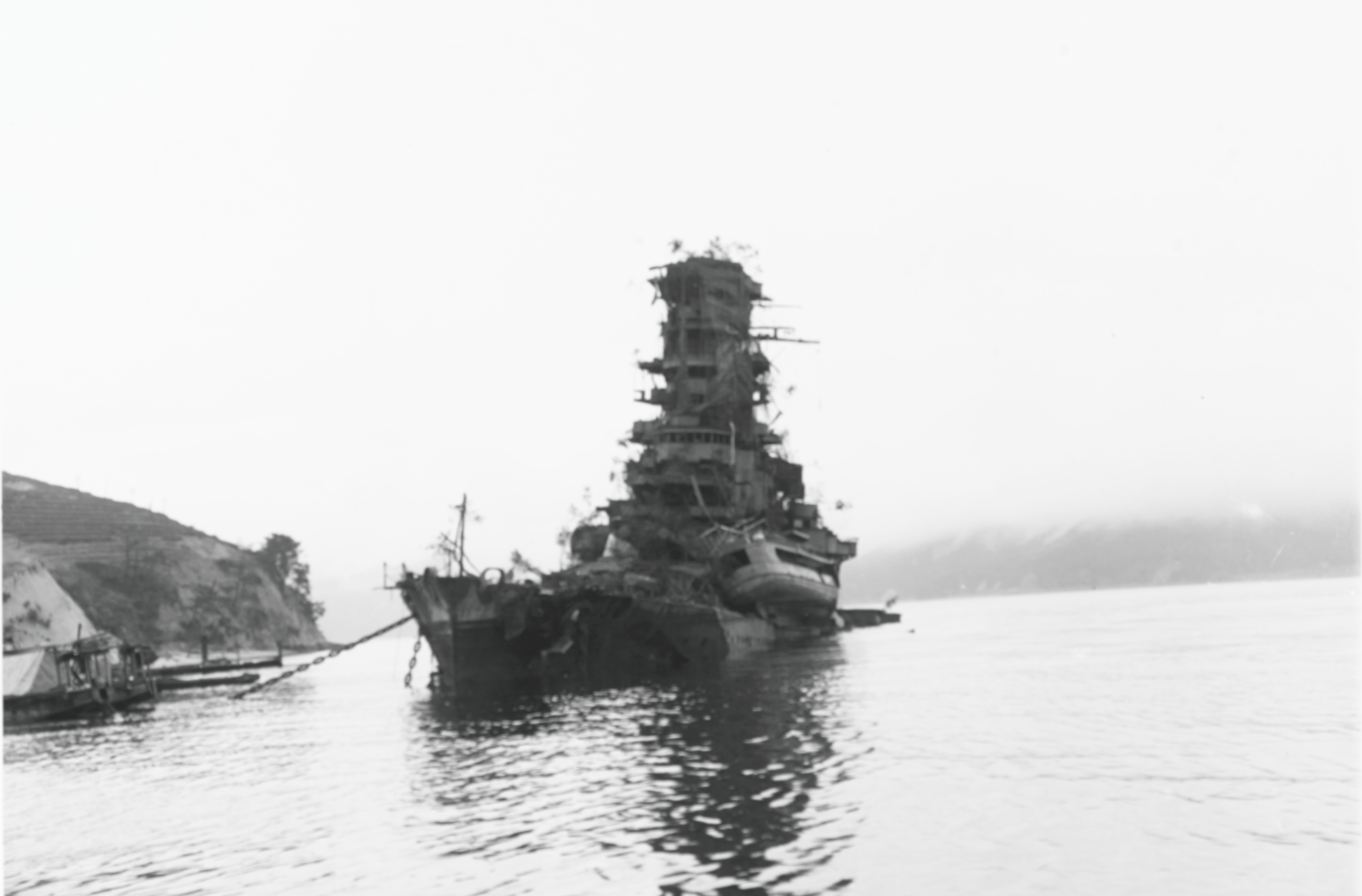
The rebuilt battlecruiser Haruna sank at her moorings in the naval base of Kure on 24 July during a series of bombings

As a result of the losses it had suffered, the Imperial Japanese Navy (IJN) had ceased to be an effective fighting force. Following a series of raids on the Japanese shipyard at Kure, the only major warships in somewhat fighting order were six aircraft carriers, four cruisers, and one battleship, of which many were heavily damaged and none could be fueled adequately. Although 19 destroyers and 38 submarines were still operational, their use was also limited by the lack of fuel.

=== Defense preparations ===
Faced with the prospect of an invasion of the Home Islands, starting with Kyūshū, and the prospect of a Soviet invasion of Manchuria—Japan's last source of natural resources—the War Journal of the Imperial Headquarters concluded in 1944:

We can no longer direct the war with any hope of success. The only course left is for Japan's one hundred million people to sacrifice their lives by charging the enemy to make them lose the will to fight.

As a final attempt to stop the Allied advances, the Japanese Imperial High Command planned an all-out defense of Kyūshū codenamed Operation Ketsugō. This was to be a radical departure from the defense in depth plans used in the invasions of Peleliu, Iwo Jima, and Okinawa. Instead, everything was staked on the beachhead; more than 3,000 kamikazes would be sent to attack the amphibious transports before troops and cargo were disembarked on the beach.

If this did not drive the Allies away, they planned to send another 3,500 kamikazes along with 5,000 Shin'yō suicide motorboats and the remaining destroyers and submarines—"the last of the Navy's operating fleet"—to the beach. If the Allies had fought through this and successfully landed on Kyūshū, 3,000 planes would have been left to defend the remaining islands, although Kyūshū would be "defended to the last" regardless. The strategy of making a last stand at Kyūshū was based on the assumption of continued Soviet neutrality.

== Supreme Council for the Direction of the War ==
Japanese policy-making centered on the Supreme Council for the Direction of the War (created in 1944 by earlier Prime Minister Kuniaki Koiso), the so-called "Big Six"—the Prime Minister, Minister of Foreign Affairs, Minister of the Army, Minister of the Navy, Chief of the Army General Staff, and Chief of the Navy General Staff. At the formation of the Suzuki government in April 1945, the council's membership consisted of:

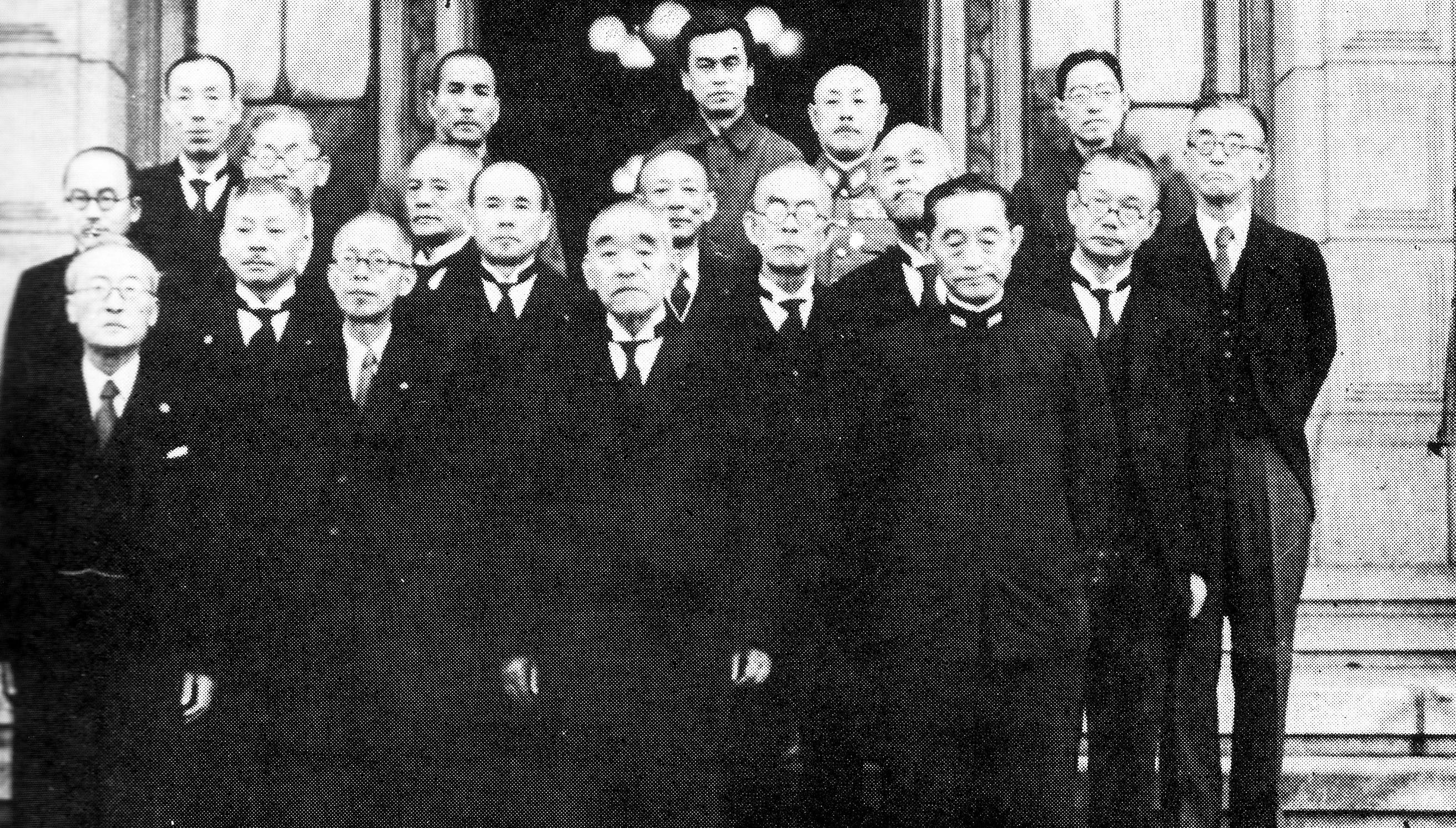
The Kantarō Suzuki Cabinet in June 1945

- Prime Minister: Admiral Kantarō Suzuki
- Minister of Foreign Affairs: Shigenori Tōgō
- Minister of the Army: General Korechika Anami
- Minister of the Navy: Admiral Mitsumasa Yonai
- Chief of the Army General Staff: General Yoshijirō Umezu
- Chief of the Navy General Staff: Admiral Koshirō Oikawa (later replaced by Admiral Soemu Toyoda)

All of these positions were nominally appointed by the Emperor and their holders were answerable directly to him. Nevertheless, Japanese civil law from 1936 required that the Army and Navy ministers had to be active duty flag officers from those respective services while Japanese military law from long before that time prohibited serving officers from accepting political offices without first obtaining permission from their respective service headquarters which, if and when granted, could be rescinded at any time. Thus, the Japanese Army and Navy effectively held a legal right to nominate (or refuse to nominate) their respective ministers, in addition to the effective right to order their respective ministers to resign their posts.

Strict constitutional convention dictated (as it technically still does today) that a prospective Prime Minister could not assume the premiership, nor could an incumbent Prime Minister remain in office, if he could not fill all of the cabinet posts. Thus, the Army and Navy could prevent the formation of undesirable governments, or by resignation bring about the collapse of an existing government.

Emperor Hirohito and Lord Keeper of the Privy Seal Kōichi Kido also were present at some meetings, following the Emperor's wishes. Iris Chang reports that the Japanese destroyed, hid or falsified most of their secret wartime documents before General MacArthur arrived."

== Japanese leadership divisions ==
For the most part, Suzuki's military-dominated cabinet favored continuing the war. For the Japanese, surrender was unthinkable—Japan had never been successfully invaded or lost a war in its history. Only Mitsumasa Yonai, the Navy minister, was known to desire an early end to the war. According to historian Richard B. Frank:

Although Suzuki might indeed have seen peace as a distant goal, he had no design to achieve it within any immediate time span or on terms acceptable to the Allies. His own comments at the conference of senior statesmen gave no hint that he favored any early cessation of the war ... Suzuki's selections for the most critical cabinet posts were, with one exception, not advocates of peace either.

After the war, Suzuki and others from his government and their apologists claimed they were secretly working towards peace, and could not publicly advocate it. They cite the Japanese concept of haragei—"the art of hidden and invisible technique"—to justify the dissonance between their public actions and alleged behind-the-scenes work. However, many historians reject this. Robert J. C. Butow wrote:

Because of its very ambiguity, the plea of haragei invites the suspicion that in questions of politics and diplomacy a conscious reliance upon this 'art of bluff' may have constituted a purposeful deception predicated upon a desire to play both ends against the middle. While this judgment does not accord with the much-lauded character of Admiral Suzuki, the fact remains that from the moment he became Premier until the day he resigned no one could ever be quite sure of what Suzuki would do or say next.

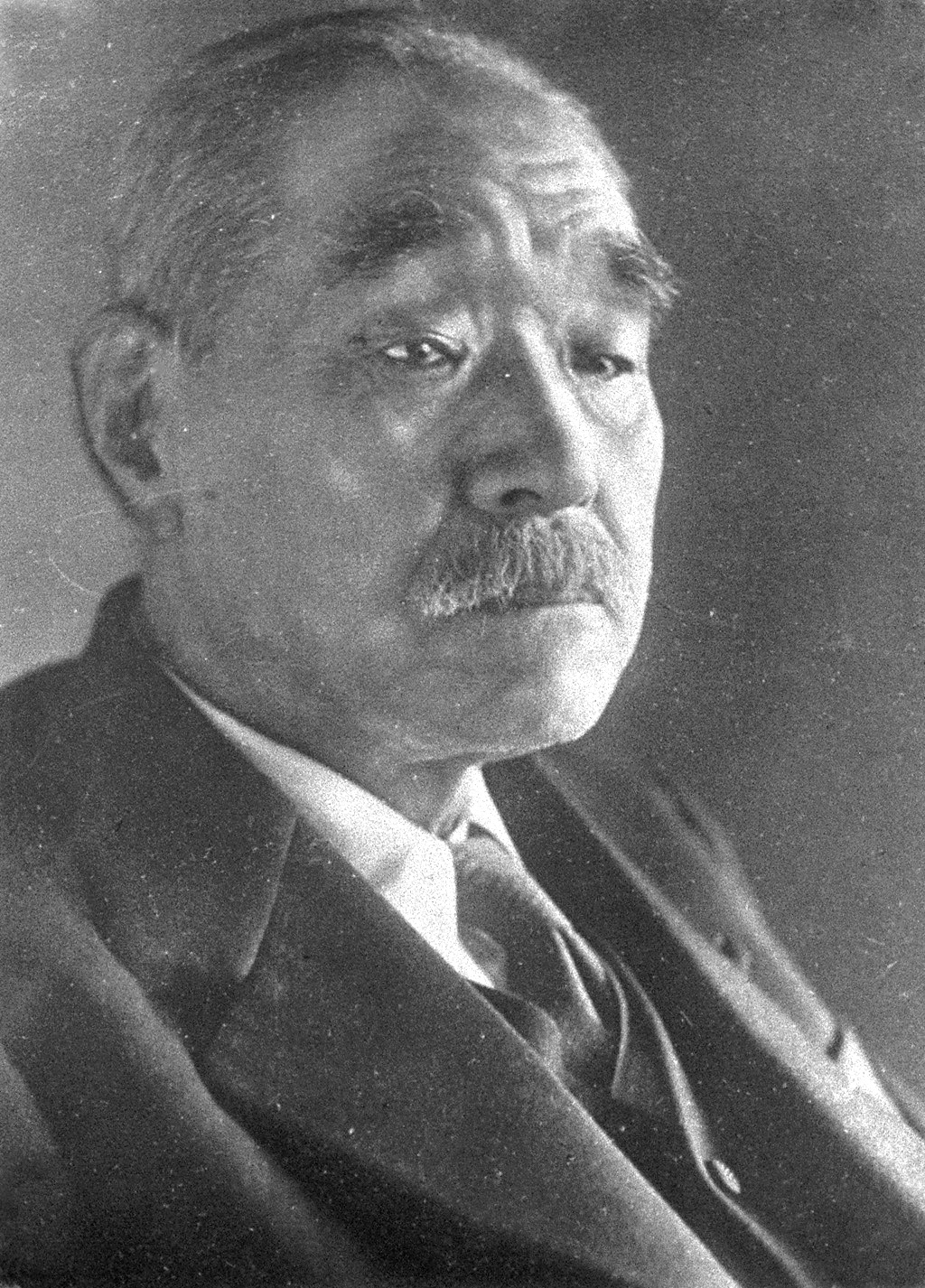
As prime minister, Admiral Kantarō Suzuki headed the Japanese government in the final months of the war

Japanese leaders had always envisioned a negotiated settlement to the war. Their prewar planning expected a rapid expansion and consolidation, an eventual conflict with the United States, and finally a settlement in which they would be able to retain at least some new territory they had conquered. By 1945, Japan's leaders were in agreement that the war was going badly, but they disagreed over the best means to negotiate its end. There were two camps: the so-called "peace" camp favored a diplomatic initiative to persuade Joseph Stalin, the leader of the Soviet Union, to mediate a settlement between the Allies and Japan; and the hardliners who favored fighting one last "decisive" battle that would inflict so many casualties on the Allies that they would be willing to offer more lenient terms. Both approaches were based on Japan's experience in the Russo–Japanese War, forty years earlier, which consisted of a series of costly but largely indecisive battles, followed by the decisive naval Battle of Tsushima.

In February 1945, Prince Fumimaro Konoe gave Emperor Hirohito a memorandum analyzing the situation, and told him that if the war continued, the imperial family might be in greater danger from an internal revolution than from defeat. According to the diary of Grand Chamberlain Hisanori Fujita, the Emperor, looking for a decisive battle (tennōzan), replied that it was premature to seek peace "unless we make one more military gain". Also in February, Japan's treaty division wrote about Allied policies towards Japan regarding "unconditional surrender, occupation, disarmament, elimination of militarism, democratic reforms, punishment of war criminals, and the status of the emperor." Allied-imposed disarmament, Allied punishment of Japanese war criminals, and especially occupation and removal of the Emperor, were not acceptable to the Japanese leadership.

On 5 April, the Soviet Union gave the required 12 months' notice that it would not renew the five-year Soviet–Japanese Neutrality Pact (which had been signed in 1941 following the Nomonhan Incident). Unknown to the Japanese, at the Tehran Conference in November–December 1943, it had been agreed that the Soviet Union would enter the war against Japan once Germany was defeated. At the Yalta Conference in February 1945, the United States had made substantial concessions to the Soviets to secure a promise that they would declare war on Japan within three months of the surrender of Germany. Although the five-year Neutrality Pact did not expire until 5 April 1946, the announcement caused the Japanese great concern, because Japan had amassed its forces in the South to repel the inevitable US attack, thus leaving its Northern islands vulnerable to Soviet invasion. Soviet Foreign Minister Vyacheslav Molotov, in Moscow, and Yakov Malik, Soviet ambassador in Tokyo, went to great lengths to assure the Japanese that "the period of the Pact's validity has not ended".

At a series of high-level meetings in May, the Big Six first seriously discussed ending the war, but none of them on terms that would have been acceptable to the Allies. Because anyone openly supporting Japanese surrender risked assassination by zealous army officers, the meetings were closed to anyone except the Big Six, the Emperor, and the Privy Seal. No second or third-echelon officers could attend. At these meetings, despite the dispatches from Japanese ambassador Satō in Moscow, only Foreign Minister Tōgō realized that Roosevelt and Churchill might have already made concessions to Stalin to bring the Soviets into the war against Japan. Tōgō had been outspoken about ending the war quickly. As a result of these meetings, he was authorized to approach the Soviet Union, seeking to maintain its neutrality, or (despite the very remote probability) to form an alliance.

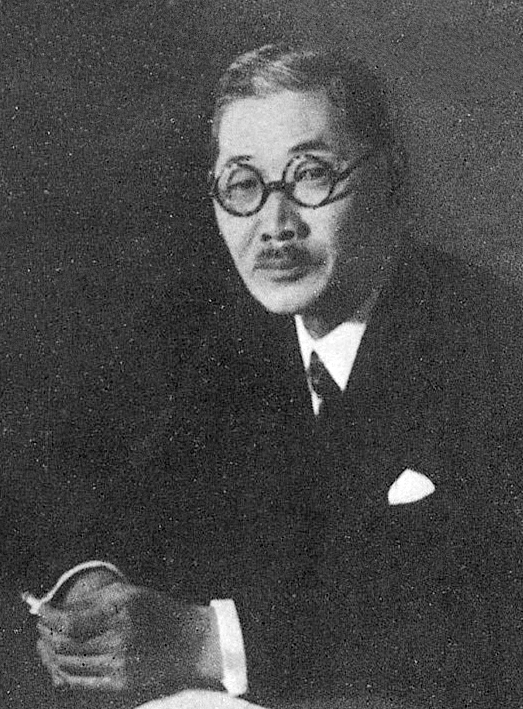
Foreign Minister Shigenori Tōgō

In keeping with the custom of a new government declaring its purposes, following the May meetings the Army staff produced a document, "The Fundamental Policy to Be Followed Henceforth in the Conduct of the War," which stated that the Japanese people would fight to extinction rather than surrender. This policy was adopted by the Big Six on 6 June. (Tōgō opposed it, while the other five supported it.) Documents submitted by Suzuki at the same meeting suggested that, in the diplomatic overtures to the USSR, Japan adopt the following approach:

It should be clearly made known to Russia that she owes her victory over Germany to Japan, since we remained neutral, and that it would be to the advantage of the Soviets to help Japan maintain her international position, since they have the United States as an enemy in the future.

On 9 June, the Emperor's confidant Marquis Kōichi Kido wrote a "Draft Plan for Controlling the Crisis Situation," warning that by the end of the year Japan's ability to wage modern war would be extinguished and the government would be unable to contain civil unrest. "... We cannot be sure we will not share the fate of Germany and be reduced to adverse circumstances under which we will not attain even our supreme object of safeguarding the Imperial Household and preserving the national polity." Kido proposed that the Emperor take action, by offering to end the war on "very generous terms." Kido proposed that Japan withdraw from the formerly European colonies it had occupied provided they were granted independence and also proposed that Japan recognize the independence of the Philippines, which Japan had already mostly lost control of and to which it was well known that the U.S. had long been planning to grant independence. Finally, Kido proposed that Japan disarm provided this not occur under Allied supervision and that Japan for a time be "content with minimum defense." Kido's proposal did not contemplate Allied occupation of Japan, prosecution of war criminals or substantial change in Japan's system of government, nor did Kido suggest that Japan might be willing to consider relinquishing territories acquired prior to 1937 including Formosa, Karafuto, Korea, the formerly German islands in the Pacific and even Manchukuo. With the Emperor's authorization, Kido approached several members of the Supreme Council, the "Big Six." Tōgō was very supportive. Suzuki and Admiral Mitsumasa Yonai, the Navy minister, were both cautiously supportive; each wondered what the other thought. General Korechika Anami, the Army minister, was ambivalent, insisting that diplomacy must wait until "after the United States has sustained heavy losses" in Operation Ketsugō.

In June, the Emperor lost confidence in the chances of achieving a military victory. The Battle of Okinawa was lost, and he learned of the weakness of the Japanese army in China, of the Kwantung Army in Manchuria, of the navy, and of the army defending the Home Islands. The Emperor received a report by Prince Higashikuni from which he concluded that "it was not just the coast defense; the divisions reserved to engage in the decisive battle also did not have sufficient numbers of weapons." According to the Emperor:

I was told that the iron from bomb fragments dropped by the enemy was being used to make shovels. This confirmed my opinion that we were no longer in a position to continue the war.

On 22 June, the Emperor summoned the Big Six to a meeting. Unusually, he spoke first: "I desire that concrete plans to end the war, unhampered by existing policy, be speedily studied and that efforts made to implement them." It was agreed to solicit Soviet aid in ending the war. Other neutral nations, such as Switzerland, Sweden, and the Vatican City, were known to be willing to play a role in making peace, but they were so small they were believed unable to do more than deliver the Allies' terms of surrender and Japan's acceptance or rejection. The Japanese hoped that the Soviet Union could be persuaded to act as an agent for Japan in negotiations with the United States and Britain.

== Manhattan Project ==
After several years of preliminary research, President Franklin D. Roosevelt had authorized the initiation of a massive, top-secret project to build atomic bombs in 1942. The Manhattan Project, under the authority of Major General Leslie R. Groves Jr. employed hundreds of thousands of American workers at dozens of secret facilities across the United States, and on 16 July 1945, the first prototype weapon was detonated during the Trinity nuclear test.

As the project neared its conclusion, American planners began to consider the use of the bomb. In keeping with the Allies' overall strategy of securing final victory in Europe first, it had initially been assumed that the first atomic weapons would be allocated for use against Germany. However, by this time it was increasingly obvious that Germany would be defeated before any bombs would be ready for use. Groves formed a committee that met in April and May 1945 to draw up a list of targets. One of the primary criteria was that the target cities must not have been damaged by conventional bombing. This would allow for an accurate assessment of the damage done by the atomic bomb. The targeting committee's list included 18 Japanese cities. At the top of the list were Kyoto, Hiroshima, Yokohama, Kokura, and Niigata. Ultimately, Kyoto was removed from the list at the insistence of Secretary of War Henry L. Stimson, who had visited the city on his honeymoon and knew of its cultural and historical significance.

Although the previous Vice President, Henry A. Wallace, had been involved in the Manhattan Project since the beginning, his successor, Harry S. Truman, was not briefed on the project by Stimson until 23 April 1945, eleven days after he became president on Roosevelt's death on 12 April 1945. On 2 May 1945, Truman approved the formation of the Interim Committee, an advisory group that would report on the atomic bomb. It consisted of Stimson, James F. Byrnes, George L. Harrison, Vannevar Bush, James Bryant Conant, Karl Taylor Compton, William L. Clayton, and Ralph Austin Bard, advised by a Scientific Panel composed of Robert Oppenheimer, Enrico Fermi, Ernest Lawrence, and Arthur Compton. In a 1 June report, the Committee concluded that the bomb should be used as soon as possible against a war plant surrounded by workers' homes and that no warning or demonstration should be given.

The committee's mandate did not include the use of the bomb—its use upon completion was presumed. Following a protest by scientists involved in the project, in the form of the Franck Report, the Committee re-examined the use of the bomb, posing the question to the Scientific Panel of whether a "demonstration" of the bomb should be used before actual battlefield deployment. In a 21 June meeting, the Scientific Panel affirmed that there was no alternative.

Truman played a very small role in these discussions. At Potsdam, he was enthralled by the successful report of the Trinity test, and those around him noticed a positive change in his attitude, believing the bomb gave him leverage with both Japan and the Soviet Union. Other than backing Stimson's play to remove Kyoto from the target list (as the military continued to push for it as a target), he was otherwise not involved in any decision-making regarding the bomb, contrary to later retellings of the story (including Truman's own embellishments).

== Proposed invasion ==
On 18 June 1945, Truman met with the Chief of Army Staff General George Marshall, Air Force General Henry Arnold, Chief of Staff Admiral William Leahy and Admiral Ernest King, Navy Secretary James Forrestal, Secretary for War Henry Stimson and Assistant Secretary for War John McCloy to discuss Operation Olympic, part of a plan to invade the Japanese home islands. General Marshall supported the entry of the Red Army, believing that doing so would cause Japan to capitulate. McCloy had told Stimson that there were no more Japanese cities to be bombed and wanted to explore other options of bringing about a surrender. He suggested a political solution and asked about warning the Japanese of the atomic bomb. James Byrnes, who would become the new Secretary of State on 3 July, wanted to use it as quickly as possible without warning and without letting the Soviets know beforehand.

== Negotiation attempts with the Soviet Union ==
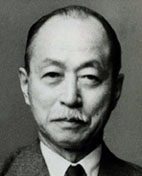
Naotake Satō

On 30 June, Tōgō told Naotake Satō, Japan's ambassador in Moscow, to try to establish "firm and lasting relations of friendship." Satō was to discuss the status of Manchuria and "any matter the Russians would like to bring up." Well aware of the overall situation and cognizant of their promises to the Allies, the Soviets responded with delaying tactics to encourage the Japanese without promising anything. Satō finally met with Soviet Foreign Minister Vyacheslav Molotov on 11 July, but without result. On 12 July, Tōgō directed Satō to tell the Soviets that:

His Majesty the Emperor, mindful of the fact that the present war daily brings greater evil and sacrifice upon the peoples of all the belligerent powers, desires from his heart that it may be quickly terminated. But so long as England and the United States insist upon unconditional surrender, the Japanese Empire has no alternative but to fight on with all its strength for the honor and existence of the Motherland.

The Emperor proposed sending Prince Konoe as a special envoy, although he would be unable to reach Moscow before the Potsdam Conference.

Satō advised Tōgō that in reality, "unconditional surrender or terms closely equivalent thereto" was all that Japan could expect. Moreover, in response to Molotov's requests for specific proposals, Satō suggested that Tōgō's messages were not "clear about the views of the Government and the Military with regard to the termination of the war," thus questioning whether Tōgō's initiative was supported by the key elements of Japan's power structure.

On 17 July, Tōgō responded:

Although the directing powers, and the government as well, are convinced that our war strength still can deliver considerable blows to the enemy, we are unable to feel absolutely secure peace of mind ... Please bear particularly in mind, however, that we are not seeking the Russians' mediation for anything like an unconditional surrender.

In reply, Satō clarified:

It goes without saying that in my earlier message calling for unconditional surrender or closely equivalent terms, I made an exception of the question of preserving [the imperial family].

On 21 July, speaking in the name of the cabinet, Tōgō repeated:

With regard to unconditional surrender we are unable to consent to it under any circumstances whatever. ... It is in order to avoid such a state of affairs that we are seeking a peace, ... through the good offices of Russia. ... it would also be disadvantageous and impossible, from the standpoint of foreign and domestic considerations, to make an immediate declaration of specific terms.

American cryptographers had broken most of Japan's codes, including the Purple code used by the Japanese Foreign Office to encode high-level diplomatic correspondence. As a result, messages between Tokyo and Japan's embassies were provided to Allied policy-makers nearly as quickly as to the intended recipients. Fearing heavy casualties, the Allies wished for Soviet entry in the Pacific War at the earliest possible date. Roosevelt had secured Stalin's promise at Cairo, which was re-affirmed at Yalta. That outcome was greatly feared in Japan.

=== Soviet intentions ===
Security concerns dominated Soviet decisions concerning the Far East. Chief among these was gaining unrestricted access to the Pacific Ocean. The year-round ice-free areas of the Soviet Pacific coastline—Vladivostok in particular—could be blockaded by air and sea from Sakhalin island and the Kurile Islands. Acquiring these territories, thus guaranteeing free access to the Soya Strait, was their primary objective. Secondary objectives were leases for the Chinese Eastern Railway, Southern Manchuria Railway, Dairen, and Port Arthur.

To this end, Stalin and Molotov strung out the negotiations with the Japanese, giving them false hope of a Soviet-mediated peace. At the same time, in their dealings with the United States and Britain, the Soviets insisted on strict adherence to the Cairo Declaration, re-affirmed at the Yalta Conference, that the Allies would not accept separate or conditional peace with Japan. The Japanese would have to surrender unconditionally to all the Allies. To prolong the war, the Soviets opposed any attempt to weaken this requirement. This would give the Soviets time to complete the transfer of their troops from the Western Front to the Far East, and conquer Manchuria, Inner Mongolia, northern Korea, South Sakhalin, the Kuriles, and possibly Hokkaido (starting with a landing at Rumoi).

== Events at Potsdam ==
The leaders of the major Allied powers met at the Potsdam Conference from 16 July to 2 August 1945. The participants were the Soviet Union, the United Kingdom, and the United States, represented by Stalin, Winston Churchill (later Clement Attlee), and Truman respectively.

=== Negotiations ===
Although the Potsdam Conference was mainly concerned with European affairs, the war against Japan was also discussed in detail. Truman learned of the successful Trinity test early in the conference and shared this information with the British delegation. The successful test caused the American delegation to reconsider the necessity and wisdom of Soviet participation, for which the U.S. had lobbied hard at the Tehran and Yalta Conferences. The United States prioritized shortening the war and reducing American casualties—Soviet intervention seemed likely to do both, but at the cost of possibly allowing the Soviets to capture territory beyond that which had been promised to them at Tehran and Yalta, and causing a postwar division of Japan similar to that which had occurred in Germany.

In dealing with Stalin, Truman decided to give the Soviet leader vague hints about the existence of a powerful new weapon without going into details. However, the other Allies were unaware that Soviet intelligence had penetrated the Manhattan Project in its early stages, so Stalin already knew of the existence of the atomic bomb but did not appear impressed by its potential.

=== Potsdam Declaration ===
It was decided to issue a statement, the Potsdam Declaration, defining "Unconditional Surrender" and clarifying what it meant for the position of the emperor and for Hirohito personally. The American and British governments strongly disagreed on this point—the United States wanted to abolish the monarchy, or to force the Emperor from the throne and possibly try him as a war criminal, while the British wanted to retain the imperial family's position, perhaps with Hirohito still reigning. Furthermore, although it would not initially be a party to the declaration, the Soviet government also had to be consulted since it would be expected to endorse it upon entering the war. Assuring the retention of the emperor would change the Allied policy of unconditional surrender and necessitated consent from Stalin. The American Secretary of State James Byrnes, however, wanted to keep the Soviets out of the Pacific war as much as possible and persuaded Truman to delete any such assurances. The Potsdam Declaration went through many drafts until a version acceptable to all was found.

On 26 July, the United States, Britain and China released the Potsdam Declaration announcing the terms for Japan's surrender, with the warning, "We will not deviate from them. There are no alternatives. We shall brook no delay." For Japan, the terms of the declaration specified:

- the elimination "for all time [of] the authority and influence of those who have deceived and misled the people of Japan into embarking on world conquest"
- the occupation of "points in Japanese territory to be designated by the Allies"
- that the "Japanese sovereignty shall be limited to the islands of Honshū, Hokkaido, Kyūshū, Shikoku and such minor islands as we determine." As had been announced in the Cairo Declaration in 1943, Japan was to be reduced to her pre-1894 territory and stripped of her pre-war empire including Korea and Taiwan, as well as all her recent conquests.
- that "[t]he Japanese military forces, after being completely disarmed, shall be permitted to return to their homes with the opportunity to lead peaceful and productive lives."
- that "[w]e do not intend that the Japanese shall be enslaved as a race or destroyed as a nation, but stern justice shall be meted out to all war criminals, including those who have visited cruelties upon our prisoners."

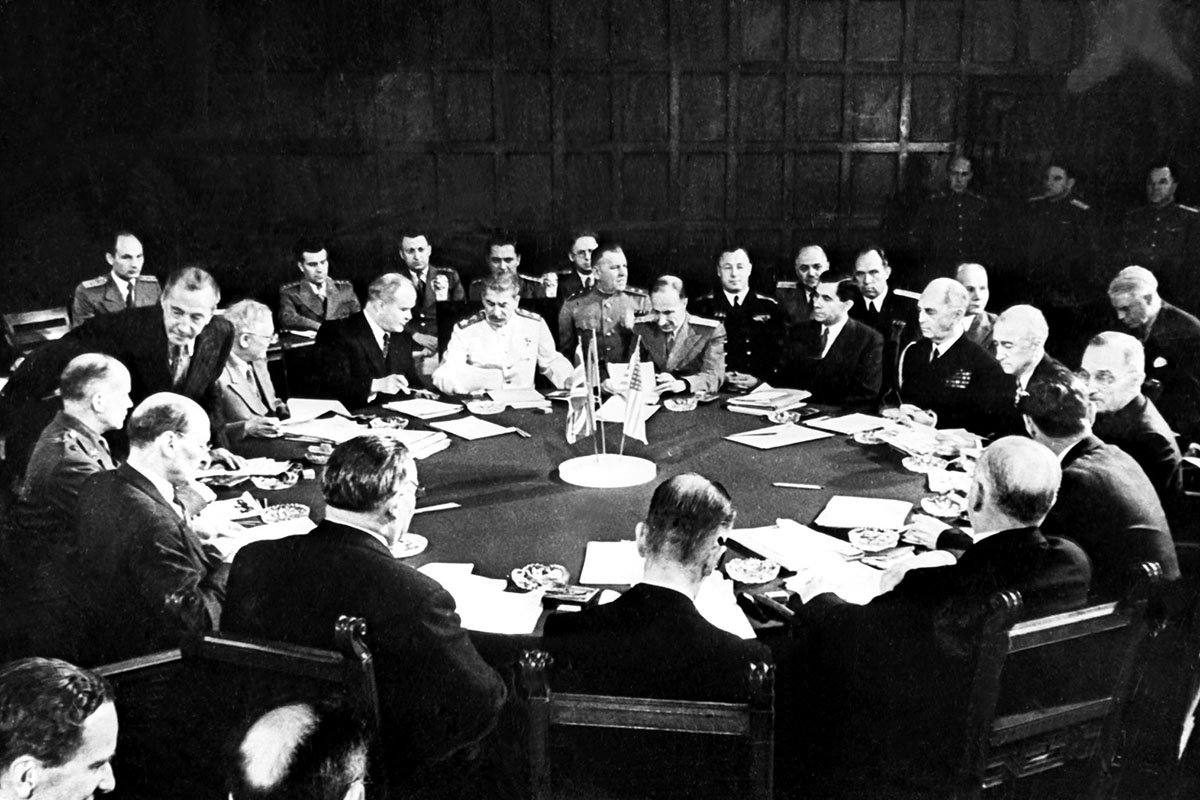
A session of the Potsdam Conference – those pictured include Clement Attlee, Ernest Bevin, Vyacheslav Molotov, Joseph Stalin, William D. Leahy, James F. Byrnes, and Harry S. Truman.

On the other hand, the declaration stated that:

- "The Japanese Government shall remove all obstacles to the revival and strengthening of democratic tendencies among the Japanese people. Freedom of speech, of religion, and of thought, as well as respect for the fundamental human rights shall be established."
- "Japan shall be permitted to maintain such industries as will sustain her economy and permit the exaction of just reparations in kind, but not those which would enable her to rearm for war. To this end, access to, as distinguished from control of, raw materials shall be permitted. Eventual Japanese participation in world trade relations shall be permitted."
- "The occupying forces of the Allies shall be withdrawn from Japan as soon as these objectives have been accomplished and there has been established, in accordance with the freely expressed will of the Japanese people, a peacefully inclined and responsible government."

The only use of the term "unconditional surrender" came at the end of the declaration:

- "We call upon the government of Japan to proclaim now the unconditional surrender of all Japanese armed forces, and to provide proper and adequate assurances of their good faith in such action. The alternative for Japan is prompt and utter destruction."

Contrary to what had been intended at its conception, the Declaration made no mention of the Emperor at all. The short-lived interim Secretary of State Joseph Grew had advocated for retaining the emperor as a constitutional monarch. He hoped that preserving Hirohito's central role could facilitate an orderly capitulation of all Japanese troops in the Pacific theatre. Without it, securing a surrender could be difficult. Navy Secretary James Forrestal and other officials shared the view. Allied intentions on issues of utmost importance to the Japanese, including whether Hirohito was to be regarded as one of those who had "misled the people of Japan" or even a war criminal, or alternatively, whether the Emperor might become part of a "peacefully inclined and responsible government" were thus left unstated.

The "prompt and utter destruction" clause has been interpreted as a veiled warning about American possession of the atomic bomb (which had been tested successfully on the first day of the conference). On the other hand, the declaration also made specific references to the devastation that had been wrought upon Germany in the closing stages of the European war. To contemporary readers on both sides who were not yet aware of the atomic bomb's existence, it was easy to interpret the conclusion of the declaration simply as a threat to bring similar destruction upon Japan using conventional weapons.

=== Japanese reaction ===
On 27 July, the Japanese government considered how to respond to the Declaration. The four military members of the Big Six wanted to reject it, but Tōgō, acting under the mistaken impression that the Soviet government had no prior knowledge of its contents, persuaded the cabinet not to do so until he could get a reaction from Moscow. The cabinet decided to publish the declaration without comment for the time being. In a telegram, Shun'ichi Kase, Japan's ambassador to Switzerland, observed that "unconditional surrender" applied only to the military and not to the government or the people, and he pleaded that it should be understood that the careful language of Potsdam appeared "to have occasioned a great deal of thought" on the part of the signatory governments—"they seem to have taken pains to save face for us on various points." The next day, Japanese newspapers reported that the Declaration, the text of which had been broadcast and dropped by leaflet into Japan, had been rejected. In an attempt to manage public perception, Prime Minister Suzuki met with the press, and stated:

I consider the Joint Proclamation a rehash of the Declaration at the Cairo Conference. As for the Government, it does not attach any important value to it at all. The only thing to do is just kill it with silence (mokusatsu). We will do nothing but press on to the bitter end to bring about a successful completion of the war.

Chief Cabinet Secretary Hisatsune Sakomizu had advised Suzuki to use the expression mokusatsu (黙殺; lit. "killing with silence"). Its meaning is ambiguous and can range from "refusing to comment on" to "ignoring (by keeping silence)". What was intended by Suzuki has been the subject of debate. Tōgō later said that the making of such a statement violated the cabinet's decision to withhold comment.

On 30 July, Ambassador Satō wrote: "There is no alternative but immediate unconditional surrender if we are to prevent Russia's participation in the war." On 2 August, Tōgō wrote to Satō: "it should not be difficult for you to realize that ... our time to proceed with arrangements of ending the war before the enemy lands on the Japanese mainland is limited, on the other hand it is difficult to decide on concrete peace conditions here at home all at once."

== Hiroshima, Manchuria, and Nagasaki ==
=== 6 August: Hiroshima ===
Truman talks about the bombing of Hiroshima

On 6 August at 8:15 am local time, the Enola Gay, a Boeing B-29 Superfortress piloted by Colonel Paul Tibbets, dropped an atomic bomb (code-named Little Boy by the U.S.) on the city of Hiroshima in southwest Honshū. Throughout the day, confused reports reached Tokyo that Hiroshima had been the target of an air raid, which had leveled the city with a "blinding flash and violent blast". Later that day, they received U.S. President Truman's broadcast announcing the first use of an atomic bomb, and promising:

We are now prepared to obliterate more rapidly and completely every productive enterprise the Japanese have above ground in any city. We shall destroy their docks, their factories, and their communications. Let there be no mistake; we shall completely destroy Japan's power to make war. It was to spare the Japanese people from utter destruction that the ultimatum of July 26 was issued at Potsdam. Their leaders promptly rejected that ultimatum. If they do not now accept our terms they may expect a rain of ruin from the air, the like of which has never been seen on this earth ...

The day after the bombing, the Japanese Imperial Cabinet convened and "argued at length over ending the war promptly by accepting the Potsdam Proclamation." The Japanese Army and Navy had their own independent atomic-bomb programs and therefore the Japanese understood enough to know how very difficult building it would be. Therefore, many Japanese and in particular the military members of the government refused to believe the United States had built an atomic bomb, and the Japanese military ordered their own independent tests to determine the cause of Hiroshima's destruction. Admiral Soemu Toyoda, the Chief of the Naval General Staff, argued that even if the United States had made one, they could not have many more. American strategists, having anticipated a reaction like Toyoda's, planned to drop a second bomb shortly after the first, to convince the Japanese that the U.S. had a large supply.

In the afternoon of August 7, the Emperor reportedly told Kido, "I don't care what happens to me personally. We should lose no time in ending the war so as not to have another such tragedy." On the afternoon of August 8, Foreign Minister Shigenori Tōgō met with the Emperor, who, citing the atomic bomb, stated the war must come to an end. Per the Emperor's wishes, Tōgō met Prime Minister Kantarō Suzuki and proposed a meeting between the Supreme War Council. Later that night, Suzuki told the chief cabinet secretary Hisatsune Sakomizu, "Now that we know it was an atomic bomb that was dropped on Hiroshima, I will give my views on the termination of the war at tomorrow's cabinet meeting."

=== 9 August: Soviet invasion and Nagasaki ===
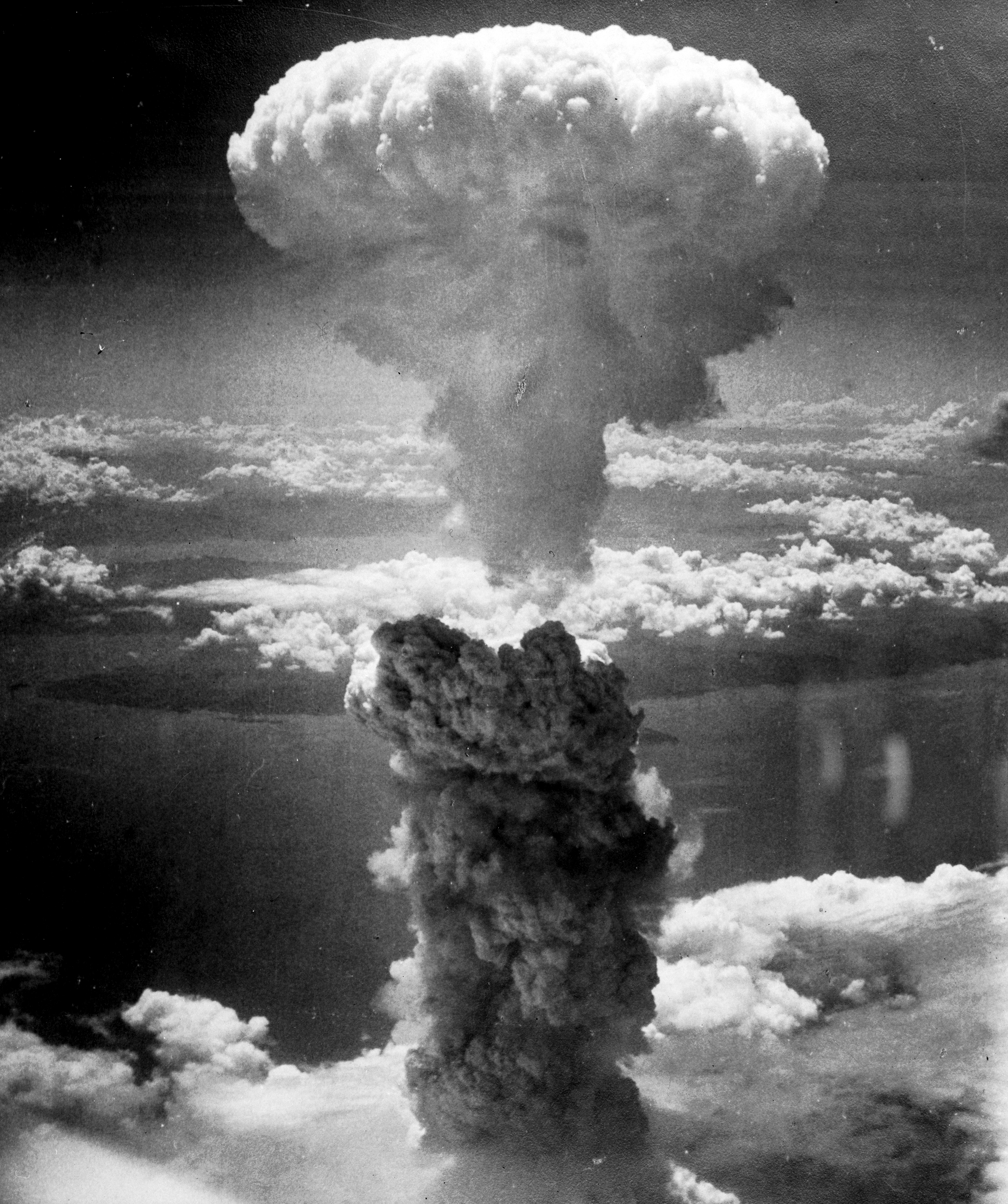
Atomic bombing of Nagasaki

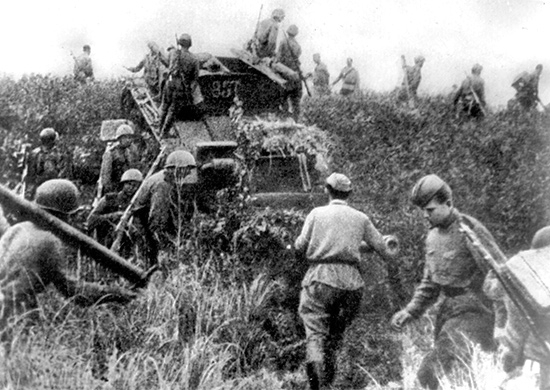
Soviet infantry entering Manchuria

At 04:00 JST on 9 August, word reached Tokyo that the Soviet Union had broken the Neutrality Pact, declared war on Japan, subscribed to the Potsdam Declaration and launched an invasion of Manchuria.

When the Russians invaded Manchuria, they sliced through what had once been an elite army and many Russian units only stopped when they ran out of gas. The Soviet 16th Army—100,000 strong—launched an invasion of the southern half of Sakhalin Island. Their orders were to mop up Japanese resistance there, and then within 10 to 14 days—be prepared to invade Hokkaido, the northernmost of Japan's home islands. The Japanese force tasked with defending Hokkaido, the 5th Area Army, was under strength at two divisions and two brigades, and was in fortified positions on the east side of the island. The Soviet plan of attack called for an invasion of Hokkaido from the west. The Soviet declaration of war also changed the calculation of how much time was left for maneuver. Japanese intelligence was predicting that U.S. forces might not invade for months. Soviet forces, on the other hand, could be in Japan proper in as little as 10 days. The Soviet invasion made a decision on ending the war extremely time sensitive.

— Ward Wilson, Foreign Policy

These "twin shocks"—the atomic bombing of Hiroshima and the Soviet entry—had immediate profound effects on Japan's leadership. Prime Minister Kantarō Suzuki and Foreign Minister Shigenori Tōgō concurred that the government must end the war at once. However, the senior leadership of the Japanese Army took the news in stride, grossly underestimating the scale of the attack. With the support of Minister of War Anami, they started preparing to impose martial law on the nation, to stop anyone attempting to make peace. Hirohito told Kido to "quickly control the situation" because "the Soviet Union has declared war and today began hostilities against us."

The Supreme Council met at 10:30 JST. Suzuki, who had just come from a meeting with the Emperor, said it was impossible to continue the war. Tōgō said that they could accept the terms of the Potsdam Declaration, but they needed a guarantee of the Emperor's position. Navy Minister Yonai said that they had to make some diplomatic proposal—they could no longer afford to wait for better circumstances.

In the middle of the meeting, shortly after 11:00, news arrived that Nagasaki, on the west coast of Kyūshū, had been hit by a second atomic bomb (called "Fat Man" by the United States). By the time the meeting ended, the Big Six had split 3–3. Suzuki, Tōgō, and Admiral Yonai favored Tōgō's one additional condition to Potsdam, while General Anami, General Umezu, and Admiral Toyoda insisted on three further terms that modified Potsdam: that Japan handle their own disarmament, that Japan deal with any Japanese war criminals, and that there be no occupation of Japan.

Following the atomic bombing of Nagasaki, Truman issued another statement:

The British, Chinese, and United States Governments have given the Japanese people adequate warning of what is in store for them. We have laid down the general terms on which they can surrender. Our warning went unheeded; our terms were rejected. Since then the Japanese have seen what our atomic bomb can do. They can foresee what it will do in the future.

The world will note that the first atomic bomb was dropped on Hiroshima, a military base. That was because we wished in this first attack to avoid, insofar as possible, the killing of civilians. But that attack is only a warning of things to come. If Japan does not surrender, bombs will have to be dropped on her war industries and, unfortunately, thousands of civilian lives will be lost. I urge Japanese civilians to leave industrial cities immediately, and save themselves from destruction.

I realize the tragic significance of the atomic bomb.

Its production and its use were not lightly undertaken by this Government. But we knew that our enemies were on the search for it. We know now how close they were to finding it. And we knew the disaster which would come to this Nation, and to all peace-loving nations, to all civilization, if they had found it first.

That is why we felt compelled to undertake the long and uncertain and costly labor of discovery and production.

We won the race of discovery against the Germans.

Having found the bomb we have used it. We have used it against those who attacked us without warning at Pearl Harbor, against those who have starved and beaten and executed American prisoners of war, against those who have abandoned all pretense of obeying international laws of warfare. We have used it in order to shorten the agony of war, in order to save the lives of thousands and thousands of young Americans.

We shall continue to use it until we completely destroy Japan's power to make war. Only a Japanese surrender will stop us.

== Discussions of surrender ==
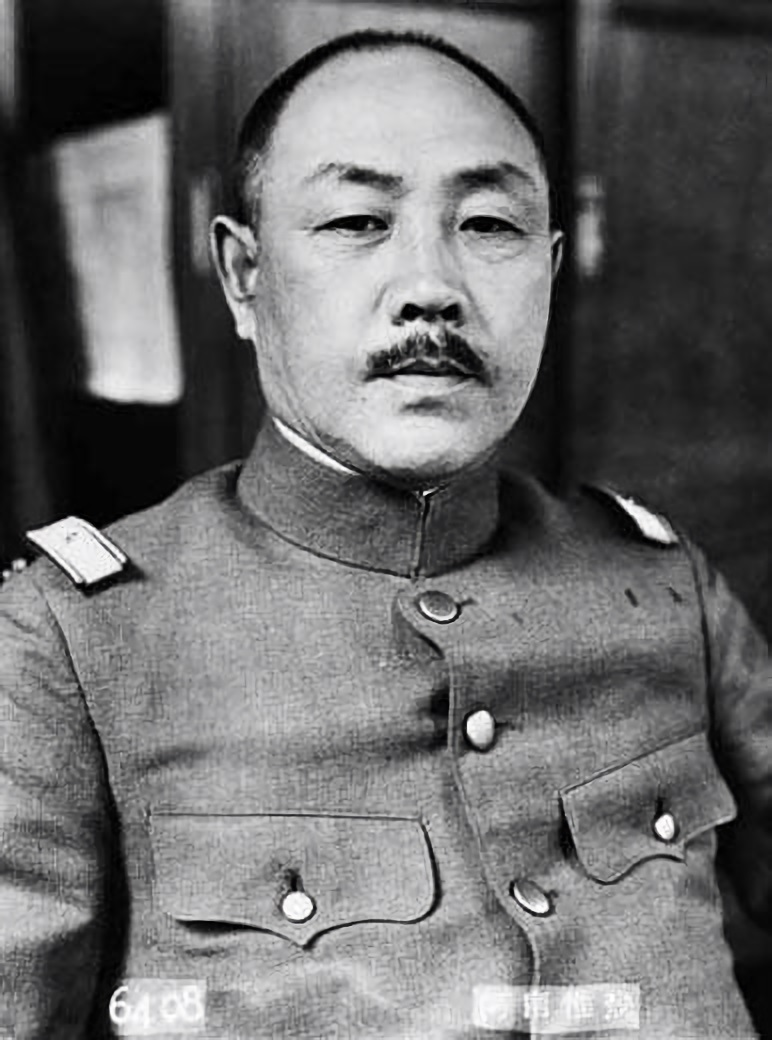
War Minister Korechika Anami

The full Japanese cabinet met at 14:30 on 9 August, and spent most of the day debating surrender. As the Big Six had done, the cabinet split, with neither Tōgō's position nor Anami's attracting a majority. Anami told the other cabinet ministers that under torture a captured American P-51 Mustang fighter pilot, Marcus McDilda, had told his interrogators that the United States possessed a stockpile of 100 atom bombs and that Tokyo and Kyoto would be destroyed "in the next few days".

In reality, the United States would not have had a third bomb ready for use until around 19 August, and a fourth in September. However, the Japanese leadership had no way to know the size of the United States' stockpile, and feared the United States might have the capacity not just to devastate individual cities, but to wipe out the Japanese people as a race and nation. Indeed, Anami expressed a desire for this outcome rather than surrender, asking if it would "not be wondrous for this whole nation to be destroyed like a beautiful flower".

Prior to the Soviet declaration of war on Japan, Japan had viewed the Soviet Union as its strongest prospect for negotiating peace, as the Japanese leadership harbored deep resentment toward the United States due to its insistence on unconditional surrender. However, after 9 August, these attitudes shifted dramatically. The limited flexibility embedded in the Potsdam Declaration enticed officials from the Japanese Foreign Ministry, having recognized that it appeared to offer the only viable path for diplomatic maneuvering. Furious debates ensued on whether surrendering to the United States provided the best opportunity to preserve the monarchy, even if it meant compromising aspects of the kokutai envisioned by ultranationalists. As soon as the Soviet Union declared war on Japan, fears resurfaced among Japan's ruling elite that communism could ultimately destroy the emperor system and the state. As a result, some members of the leadership argued that accepting the Potsdam surrender terms before the Soviet Union could impose its own was the safest way to protect the imperial family.

The cabinet meeting adjourned at 17:30 with no consensus. A second meeting lasting from 18:00 to 22:00 also ended with no consensus. Following this second meeting, Suzuki and Tōgō met the Emperor, and Suzuki proposed an impromptu Imperial conference, which started just before midnight on the night of 9–10 August. Suzuki presented Anami's four-condition proposal as the consensus position of the Supreme Council. The other members of the Supreme Council spoke, as did Kiichirō Hiranuma, the President of the Privy Council, who outlined Japan's inability to defend itself and also described the country's domestic problems, such as the shortage of food. The cabinet debated, but again no consensus emerged. At around 02:00 (10 August), Suzuki finally addressed Emperor Hirohito, asking him to break the deadlock and decide between the two positions. The participants later recollected that the Emperor stated:

I have given serious thought to the situation prevailing at home and abroad and have concluded that continuing the war can only mean destruction for the nation and prolongation of bloodshed and cruelty in the world. I cannot bear to see my innocent people suffer any longer. ...

I was told by those advocating a continuation of hostilities that by June new divisions would be in place in fortified positions [at Kujūkuri Beach, east of Tokyo] ready for the invader when he sought to land. It is now August and the fortifications still have not been completed. ...

There are those who say the key to national survival lies in a decisive battle in the homeland. The experiences of the past, however, show that there has always been a discrepancy between plans and performance. I do not believe that the discrepancy in the case of Kujūkuri can be rectified. Since this is also the shape of things, how can we repel the invaders? [He then made some specific reference to the increased destructiveness of the atomic bomb.]

It goes without saying that it is unbearable for me to see the brave and loyal fighting men of Japan disarmed. It is equally unbearable that others who have rendered me devoted service should now be punished as instigators of the war. Nevertheless, the time has come to bear the unbearable. ...

I swallow my tears and give my sanction to the proposal to accept the Allied proclamation on the basis outlined by [Tōgō,] the Foreign Minister.

According to General Sumihisa Ikeda and Admiral Zenshirō Hoshina, Privy Council President Hiranuma then turned to the Emperor and asked him: "Your Majesty, you also bear responsibility (sekinin) for this defeat. What apology are you going to make to the heroic spirits of the imperial founder of your house and your other imperial ancestors?"

Once the Emperor had left, Suzuki pushed the cabinet to accept the Emperor's will, which it did. Early that morning (10 August), the Foreign Ministry sent telegrams to the Allies (by way of Max Grässli at the Swiss Department of Foreign Affairs) announcing that Japan would accept the Potsdam Declaration, but would not accept any peace conditions that would "prejudice the prerogatives" of the Emperor. That effectively meant no change in Japan's form of government—that the Emperor of Japan would remain a position of real power.

=== 12 August ===
The Allied response to Japan's qualified acceptance of the Potsdam Declaration was written by James F. Byrnes and approved by the British, Chinese, and Soviet governments, although the Soviets agreed only reluctantly. The Allies sent their response (via the Swiss Foreign Affairs Department) on 12 August. On the status of the Emperor it said:

From the moment of surrender the authority of the Emperor and the Japanese government to rule the state shall be subject to the Supreme Commander of the Allied powers who will take such steps as he deems proper to effectuate the surrender terms. The Emperor will be required to authorize and insure the signature by the government of Japan and the Japanese Imperial General Headquarters of the surrender terms necessary to carry out the provisions of the Potsdam declaration, and shall issue his commands to all the Japanese military, naval and air authorities and to all of the forces under their control wherever located to cease active operations and to surrender their arms, and to issue such other orders as the supreme commander may require to give effect to the surrender terms. ... The ultimate form of government of Japan shall, in accordance with the Potsdam Declaration, be established by the freely expressed will of the Japanese people.

President Truman issued instructions that no further atomic weapons were to be dropped on Japan without presidential orders, but allowed military operations (including the B-29 firebombings) to continue until official word of Japanese surrender was received. However, news correspondents incorrectly interpreted a comment by General Carl Spaatz, commander of the U.S. Strategic Air Forces in the Pacific, that the B-29s were not flying on 11 August (because of bad weather) as a statement that a ceasefire was in effect. To avoid giving the Japanese the impression that the Allies had abandoned peace efforts and resumed bombing, Truman then ordered a halt to all further bombings.

The Japanese cabinet considered the Allied response, and Suzuki argued that they must reject it and insist on an explicit guarantee for the imperial system. Anami returned to his position that there be no occupation of Japan. Afterward, Tōgō told Suzuki that there was no hope of getting better terms, and Kido conveyed the Emperor's will that Japan would unconditionally surrender. In a meeting with the Emperor, Yonai spoke of his concerns about growing civil unrest:

I think the term is inappropriate, but the atomic bombs and the Soviet entry into the war are, in a sense, divine gifts. This way we don't have to say that we have quit the war because of domestic circumstances.

That day, Hirohito informed the imperial family of his decision to surrender. One of his uncles, Prince Asaka, then asked whether the war would be continued if the kokutai (imperial sovereignty) could not be preserved. The Emperor simply replied: "Of course."

=== 13–14 August ===
At the suggestion of American psychological operations experts, B-29s spent the whole of 13 August dropping leaflets over Japan, describing the Japanese offer of surrender and the Allied response. The leaflets, some of which fell upon the Imperial Palace as the Emperor and his advisors met, had a profound effect on the Japanese decision-making process. It had become clear that a complete and total acceptance of Allied terms, even if it meant the dissolution of the Japanese government as it then existed, was the only possible way to secure peace. The Big Six and the cabinet debated their reply to the Allied response late into the night, but remained deadlocked. Meanwhile, the Allies grew doubtful, waiting for the Japanese to respond. The Japanese had been instructed that they could transmit an unqualified acceptance in the clear, but instead they sent out coded messages on matters unrelated to the surrender parley. The Allies took this coded response as non-acceptance of the terms.

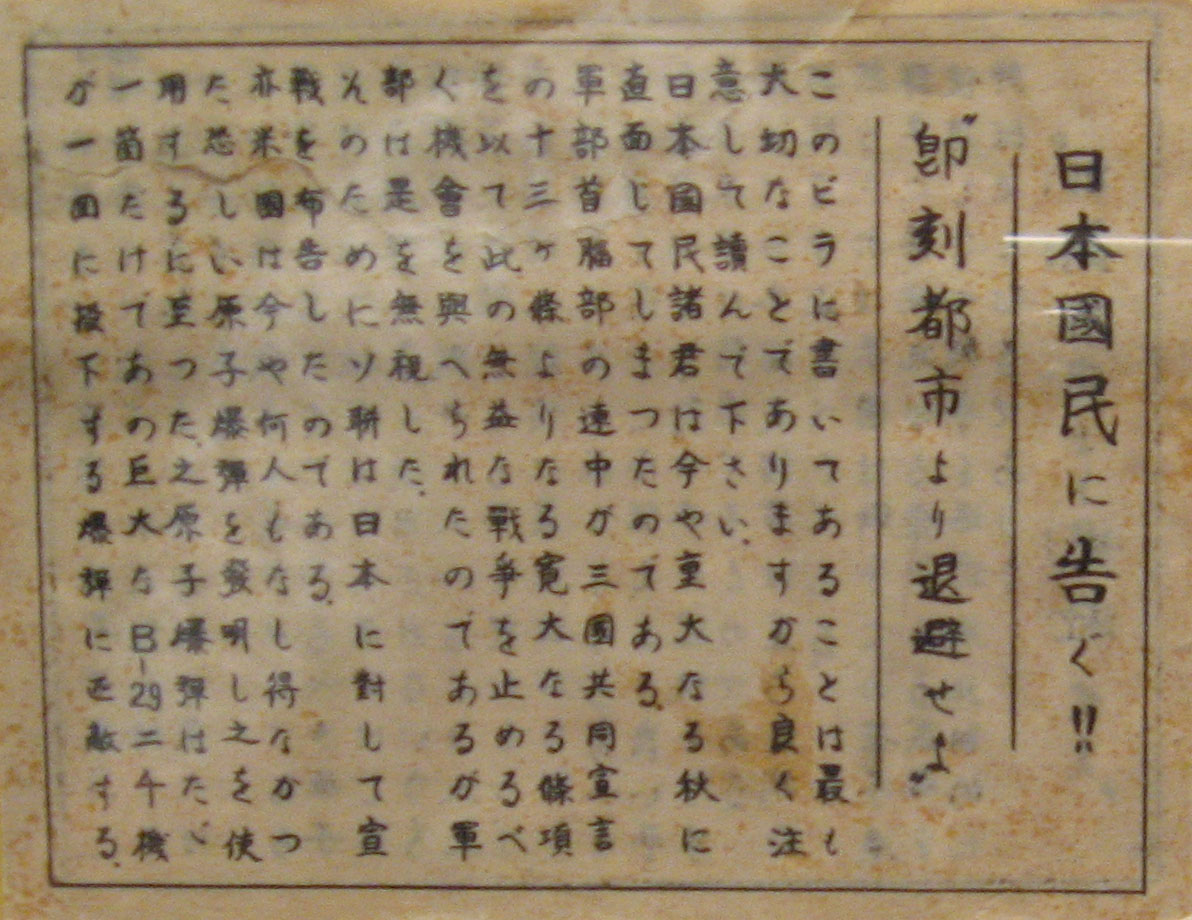
A leaflet dropped on Japan after the bombing of Hiroshima. The leaflet says, in part: "The Japanese people are facing an extremely important autumn. Your military leaders were presented with thirteen articles for surrender by our three-country alliance to put an end to this unprofitable war. This proposal was ignored by your army leaders ... [T]he United States has developed an atom bomb, which had not been done by any nation before. It has been determined to employ this frightening bomb. One atom bomb has the destructive power of 2000 B-29s."

Via Ultra intercepts, the Allies also detected increased diplomatic and military traffic, which was taken as evidence that the Japanese were preparing an "all-out banzai attack". President Truman ordered a resumption of attacks against Japan at maximum intensity "so as to impress Japanese officials that we mean business and are serious in getting them to accept our peace proposals without delay". In the largest and longest bombing raid of the Pacific War, more than 400 B-29s attacked Japan during daylight on 14 August, and more than 300 that night. A total of 1,014 aircraft were used with no losses. B-29s from the 315 Bombardment Wing flew 6,100 km (3,800 mi) to destroy the Nippon Oil Company refinery at Tsuchizaki on the northern tip of Honshū. This was the last operational refinery in the Japanese Home Islands, which produced 67% of their oil. The attacks continued right through the announcement of the Japanese surrender, and indeed for some time afterwards.

Truman had ordered a halt to atomic bombings on 10 August, upon receiving news that another bomb would be ready for use against Japan in about a week. He told his cabinet that he could not stand the thought of killing "all those kids". By 14 August, however, Truman remarked "sadly" to the British ambassador that "he now had no alternative but to order an atomic bomb dropped on Tokyo", as some of his military staff had been advocating.

As 14 August dawned, Suzuki, Kido, and the Emperor realized the day would end with either an acceptance of the American terms or a military coup. The Emperor met with the most senior Army and Navy officers. While several spoke in favor of fighting on, Field Marshal Shunroku Hata did not. As commander of the Second General Army, the headquarters of which had been in Hiroshima, Hata commanded all the troops defending southern Japan—the troops preparing to fight the "decisive battle". Hata said he had no confidence in defeating the invasion and did not dispute the Emperor's decision. The Emperor asked his military leaders to cooperate with him in ending the war.

At a conference with the cabinet and other councilors, Anami, Toyoda, and Umezu again made their case for continuing to fight, after which the Emperor said:

I have listened carefully to each of the arguments presented in opposition to the view that Japan should accept the Allied reply as it stands and without further clarification or modification, but my own thoughts have not undergone any change. ... In order that the people may know my decision, I request you to prepare at once an imperial rescript so that I may broadcast to the nation. Finally, I call upon each and every one of you to exert himself to the utmost so that we may meet the trying days which lie ahead.

The cabinet immediately convened and unanimously ratified the Emperor's wishes. They also decided to destroy vast amounts of material pertaining to war crimes and the war responsibility of the nation's highest leaders. Immediately after the conference, the Foreign Ministry transmitted orders to its embassies in Switzerland and Sweden to accept the Allied terms of surrender. These orders were picked up and received in Washington at 02:49, 14 August.

Difficulty with senior commanders on the distant war fronts was anticipated. Three princes of the Imperial Family who held military commissions were dispatched on 14 August to deliver the news personally. Prince Tsuneyoshi Takeda went to Korea and Manchuria, Prince Yasuhiko Asaka to the China Expeditionary Army and China Fleet, and Prince Kan'in Haruhito to Shanghai, South China, Indochina and Singapore.

The text of the Imperial Rescript on surrender was finalized by 19:00 on 14 August, transcribed by the official court calligrapher, and brought to the cabinet for their signatures. Around 23:00, the Emperor, with help from an NHK recording crew, made a gramophone record of himself reading it. The record was given to court chamberlain Yoshihiro Tokugawa, who hid it in a locker safe in the office of Empress Kōjun's secretary. It was later smuggled out of the palace when the attempted coup was foiled on 15 August.

== Attempted coup d'état (12–15 August) ==
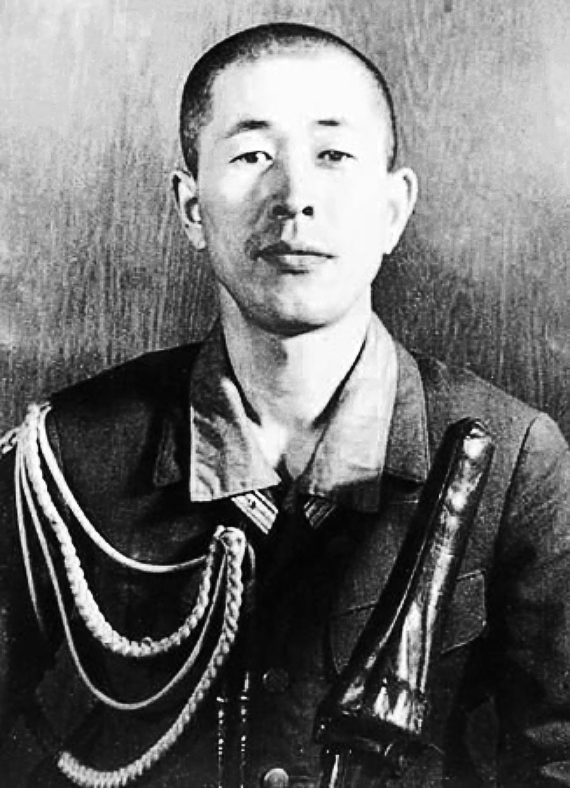
Kenji Hatanaka, leader of the coup d'état

Late at night on 12 August, Army Minister Anami was approached by a group of officers consisting of Major Kenji Hatanaka, Colonel Okikatsu Arao, and lieutenant colonels Masataka Ida, Inaba Masao, and Masahiko Takeshita—of whom Masahiko was also Anami's brother-in-law. Arao, who was Chief of the Military Affairs Section, asked Anami to do whatever he could to prevent the acceptance of the Potsdam Declaration. Anami refused to indicate whether he would aid in counteracting a potential decision to surrender. While the conspiring officers felt the support of Anami was necessary for their success, they decided they had no choice but to continue planning, and ultimately to attempt a coup d'état by themselves. Hatanaka spent much of 13 August and the morning of 14 August gathering allies, seeking support from the higher-ups in the Ministry, and finalizing his plans.

On the night of 13–14 August, an Imperial Conference resulted in a decision by the government to unconditionally surrender. Shortly after the conference's conclusion, a group of senior army officers including Anami gathered in a nearby room. Those present were concerned about the possibility of a coup being launched to prevent surrender. During this meeting, General Torashirō Kawabe, Vice Chief of the Army General Staff, proposed that the senior officers present should each sign an agreement to carry out the Emperor's order of surrender—"The Army will act in accordance with the Imperial Decision to the last." An agreement was ultimately signed by each of the most important officers present, including Minister of War Anami, Chief of the Army General Staff Umezu, commander of the 1st General Army Field Marshal Hajime Sugiyama, commander of the 2nd General Army Field Marshal Shunroku Hata and Inspector-General of Military Training Kenji Doihara. When Umezu voiced concern about air units causing trouble, Vice Minister of War Tadaichi Wakamatsu took the agreement next door to the Air General Army headquarters, where its commander Masakazu Kawabe (the brother of Torashirō) also signed. The document would serve to seriously impede any attempt to incite a coup in Tokyo.

Around 21:30 on 14 August, the conspirators led by Hatanaka set their plan into motion. The Second Regiment of the First Imperial Guards had entered the palace grounds, doubling the strength of the battalion already stationed there, presumably to provide extra protection against Hatanaka's rebellion. But Hatanaka, along with Lt. Col. Jirō Shiizaki, convinced the commander of the 2nd Regiment of the First Imperial Guards, Colonel Toyojirō Haga, of their cause, by telling him (falsely) that Generals Anami and Umezu, and the commanders of the Eastern District Army and Imperial Guards Divisions were all in on the plan. Hatanaka also went to the office of Shizuichi Tanaka, commander of the Eastern region of the army, to try to persuade him to join the coup. Tanaka refused, and ordered Hatanaka to go home. Hatanaka ignored the order.

Originally, Hatanaka hoped that simply occupying the palace and showing the beginnings of a rebellion would inspire the rest of the Army to rise up against the move to surrender. This notion guided him through much of the last days and hours and gave him the blind optimism to move ahead with the plan, despite having little support from his superiors. Having set all the pieces into position, Hatanaka and his co-conspirators decided that the Guard would take over the palace at 02:00. The hours until then were spent in continued attempts to convince their superiors in the Army to join the coup. At about the same time, General Anami committed seppuku, leaving a message that, "I—with my death—humbly apologize to the Emperor for the great crime." Whether the crime involved losing the war, or the coup, remains unclear.

At some time after 01:00, Hatanaka and his men surrounded the palace. Hatanaka, Shiizaki, Ida, and Captain Shigetarō Uehara (of the Air Force Academy) went to the office of Lt. Gen. Takeshi Mori to ask him to join the coup. Mori was in a meeting with his brother-in-law Michinori Shiraishi. The cooperation of Mori, who was the commander of the 1st Imperial Guards Division, was vital. When Mori refused to side with Hatanaka, Hatanaka killed him, fearing Mori would order the Guards to stop the rebellion. Uehara killed Shiraishi. These were the only two murders of the night. Hatanaka then used General Mori's official stamp to authorize Imperial Guards Division Strategic Order No. 584, a false set of orders created by his co-conspirators, which would greatly increase the strength of the forces occupying the Imperial Palace and Imperial Household Ministry, and "protecting" the Emperor.

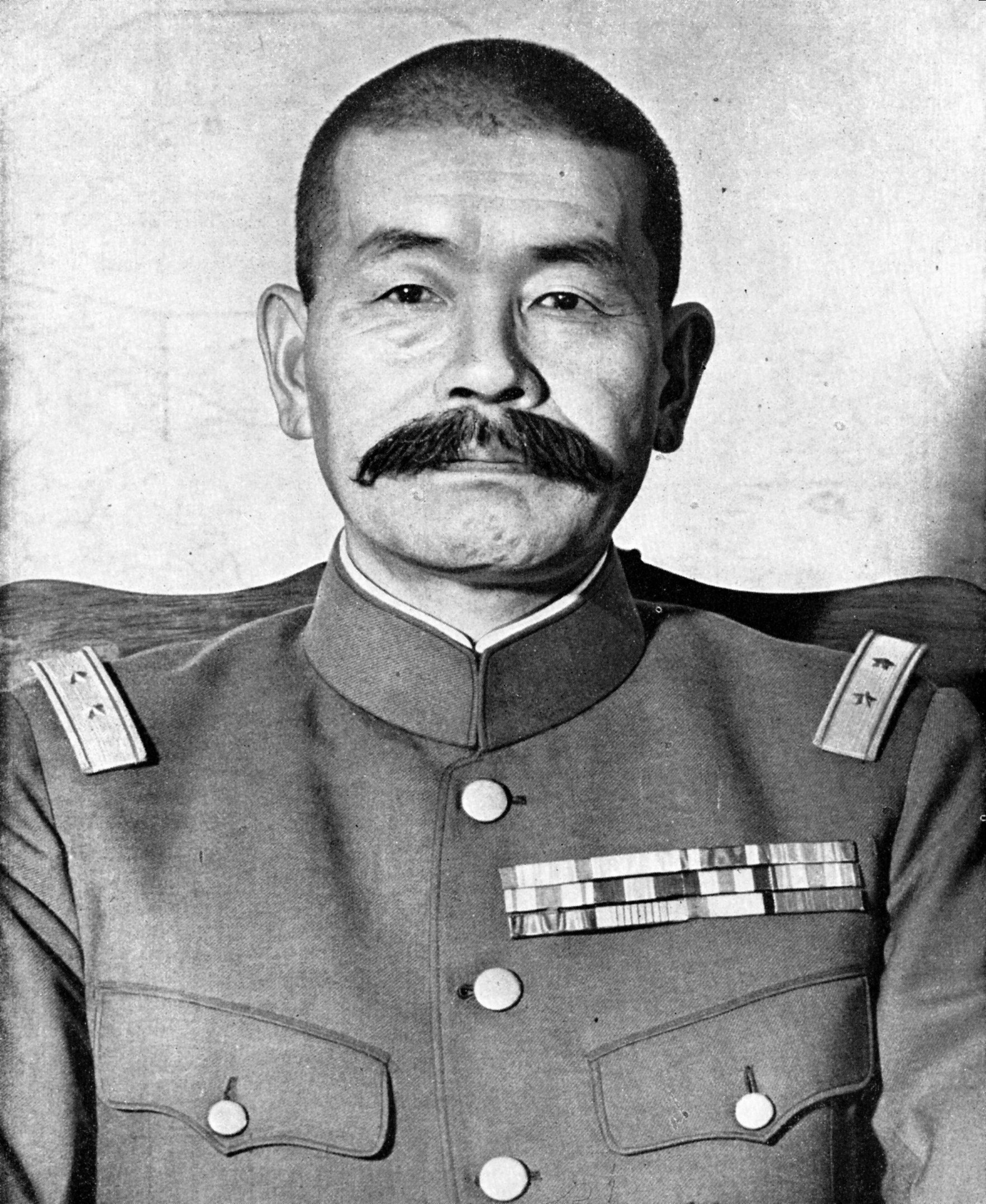
The coup collapsed after Shizuichi Tanaka convinced the rebellious officers to go home. Tanaka committed suicide nine days later.

The palace police were disarmed and all the entrances blocked. Over the course of the night, Hatanaka's rebels captured and detained eighteen people, including Ministry staff and NHK workers sent to record the surrender speech.

The rebels, led by Hatanaka, spent the next several hours fruitlessly searching for Imperial House Minister Sōtarō Ishiwata, Lord of the Privy Seal Kōichi Kido, and the recordings of the surrender speech. The two men were hiding in the "bank vault", a large chamber underneath the Imperial Palace. The search was made more difficult by a blackout in response to Allied bombings, and by the archaic organization and layout of the Imperial House Ministry. Many of the names of the rooms were unrecognizable to the rebels. The rebels did find the chamberlain Yoshihiro Tokugawa. Although Hatanaka threatened to disembowel him with a samurai sword, Tokugawa lied and told them he did not know where the recordings or men were. Meanwhile, Emperor Hirohito was inside a fortified, soundproofed bunker known as the Gobunko, located within the Imperial Palace grounds. While rebel officers seized the palace, they also failed to locate him.

At about the same time, another group of Hatanaka's rebels led by Captain Takeo Sasaki went to Prime Minister Suzuki's office, intent on killing him. When they found it empty, they machine-gunned the office and set the building on fire, then left for his home. Hisatsune Sakomizu, the chief secretary to Suzuki's Cabinet, had warned Suzuki, and he escaped minutes before the would-be assassins arrived. After setting fire to Suzuki's home, they went to the estate of Kiichirō Hiranuma to assassinate him. Hiranuma escaped through a side gate and the rebels burned his house as well. Suzuki spent the rest of August under police protection, spending each night in a different bed.

Around 03:00, Hatanaka was informed by Lieutenant Colonel Masataka Ida that the Eastern District Army was on its way to the palace to stop him, and that he should give up. Seeing his plan collapsing around him, Hatanaka pleaded with Tatsuhiko Takashima, the Chief of Staff of the Eastern District Army, to be allotted airtime on NHK radio in order to explain his intentions to the Japanese people. He was refused. Colonel Haga, commander of the 2nd Regiment of the First Imperial Guards, discovered that the Army did not support this rebellion, and he ordered Hatanaka to leave the palace grounds.

Just before 05:00, as his rebels continued their search, Major Hatanaka went to the NHK studios, where he tried desperately to get airtime to explain his actions, which the NHK announcer denied him. A little over an hour later, after receiving a telephone call from the Eastern District Army, Hatanaka finally gave up. He gathered his officers and left the NHK studio.

At dawn, Tanaka learned that the palace had been invaded. He went there and confronted the rebellious officers, berating them for acting contrary to the spirit of the Japanese army. He convinced them to return to their barracks. By 08:00, the rebellion was entirely dismantled, having succeeded in holding the palace grounds for much of the night but failing to find the recordings.

Hatanaka, on a motorcycle, and Shiizaki, on horseback, rode through the streets, tossing leaflets that explained their motives and their actions. Within an hour before the Emperor's broadcast, sometime around 11:00, 15 August, Hatanaka placed his pistol to his forehead, and shot himself. Shiizaki stabbed himself with a dagger, and then shot himself. In Hatanaka's pocket was his death poem: "I have nothing to regret now that the dark clouds have disappeared from the reign of the Emperor."

== Surrender ==
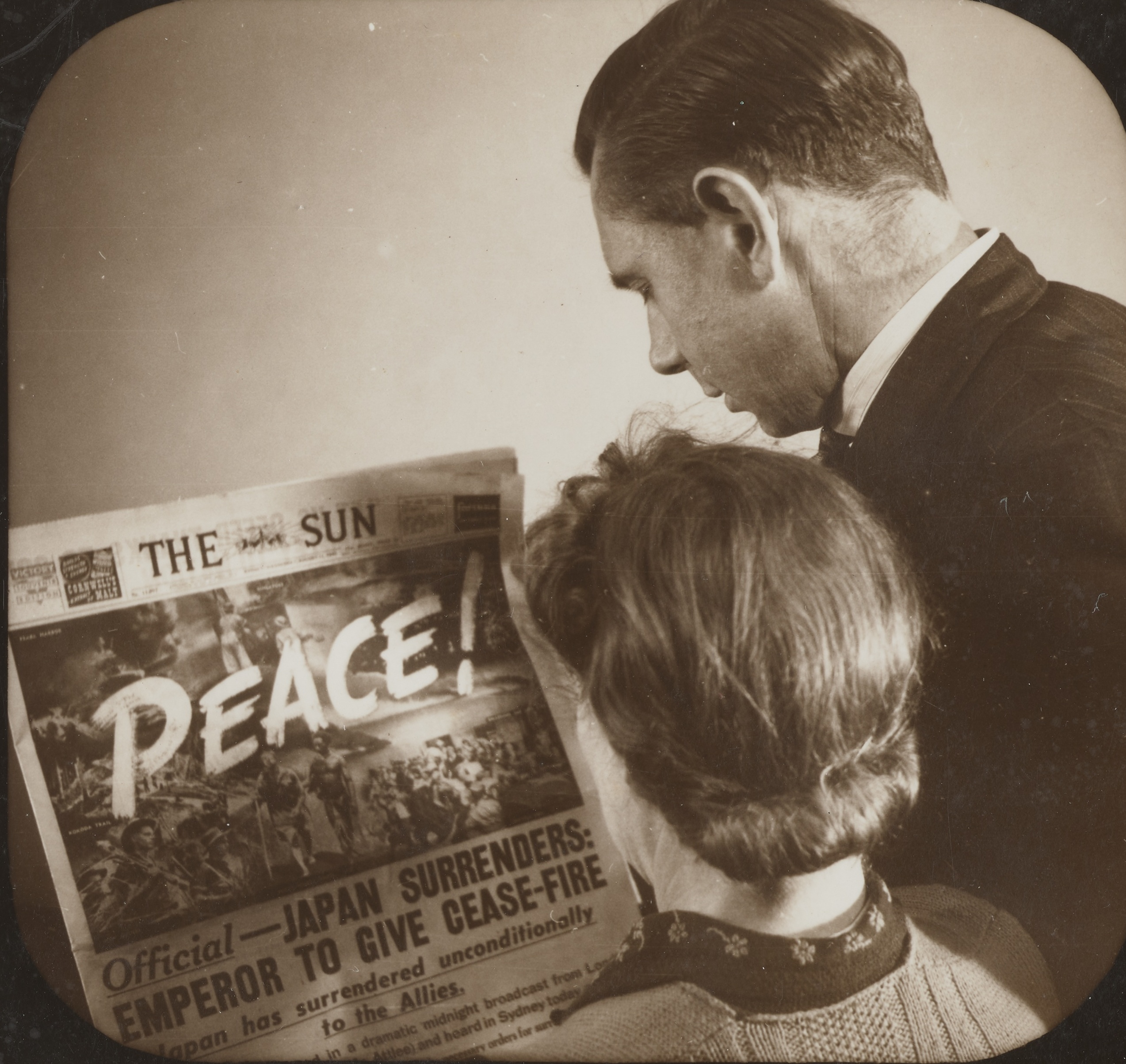
Japan Surrenders, 15 August 1945 newspaper headlines.

Emperor Hirohito gave different reasons to the public and the military for the surrender: When addressing the public, he said, "the enemy has begun to employ a new and most cruel bomb, the power of which to do damage is, indeed, incalculable ... . Should we continue to fight, not only would it result in an ultimate collapse and obliteration of the Japanese nation, but also it would lead to the total extinction of human civilization." When addressing the military, he did not mention the "new and most cruel bomb" but rather said that "the Soviet Union has entered the war against us, [and] to continue the war ... would [endanger] the very foundation of the Empire's existence."

=== 15 August 1945, surrender speech to the Japanese public ===
The Gyokuon-hōsō, the radio broadcast in which Hirohito read the Imperial Rescript on the Termination of the War, August 15, 1945.

Truman announcing surrender of Japan, 1 September 1945

At 12:00 noon Japan Standard Time on 15 August, the Emperor's recorded speech to the nation, reading the Imperial Rescript on the Termination of the War, was broadcast:

After pondering deeply the general trends of the world and the actual conditions obtaining in Our Empire today, We have decided to effect a settlement of the present situation by resorting to an extraordinary measure.

We have ordered Our Government to communicate to the Governments of the United States, Great Britain, China and the Soviet Union that Our Empire accepts the provisions of their Joint Declaration.

To strive for the common prosperity and happiness of all nations as well as the security and well-being of Our subjects is the solemn obligation which has been handed down by Our Imperial Ancestors and which lies close to Our heart.

Indeed, We declared war on America and Britain out of Our sincere desire to ensure Japan's self-preservation and the stabilization of East Asia, it being far from Our thought either to infringe upon the sovereignty of other nations or to embark upon territorial aggrandizement.

But now the war has lasted for nearly four years. Despite the best that has been done by everyone—the gallant fighting of the military and naval forces, the diligence and assiduity of Our servants of the State, and the devoted service of Our one hundred million people—the war situation has developed not necessarily to Japan's advantage, while the general trends of the world have all turned against her interest.

Moreover, the enemy has begun to employ a new and most cruel bomb, the power of which to do damage is, indeed, incalculable, taking the toll of many innocent lives. Should we continue to fight, not only would it result in an ultimate collapse and obliteration of the Japanese nation, but also it would lead to the total extinction of human civilization.

Such being the case, how are We to save the millions of Our subjects, or to atone Ourselves before the hallowed spirits of Our Imperial Ancestors? This is the reason why We have ordered the acceptance of the provisions of the Joint Declaration of the Powers...

The hardships and sufferings to which Our nation is to be subjected hereafter will be certainly great. We are keenly aware of the inmost feelings of all of you, Our subjects. However, it is according to the dictates of time and fate that We have resolved to pave the way for a grand peace for all the generations to come by enduring the unendurable and suffering what is unsufferable.

The low quality of the recording, combined with the Classical Japanese language used by the Emperor in the Rescript, made the recording very difficult to understand for most listeners. In addition, the Emperor did not explicitly mention surrender. To prevent confusion the recording was immediately followed by a clarification that Japan was indeed unconditionally surrendering to the Allies.

Public reaction to the Emperor's speech varied—many Japanese simply listened to it, then went on with their lives as best they could, while some military officers chose suicide over surrender. A small crowd gathered in front of the Imperial Palace in Tokyo and cried, but as author John Dower notes, the tears they shed "reflected a multitude of sentiments ... anguish, regret, bereavement and anger at having been deceived, sudden emptiness and loss of purpose".

On 17 August, Suzuki was replaced as prime minister by the Emperor's uncle, Prince Higashikuni, perhaps to forestall any further coup or assassination attempts.

=== 17 August 1945, surrender speech to the Japanese military ===
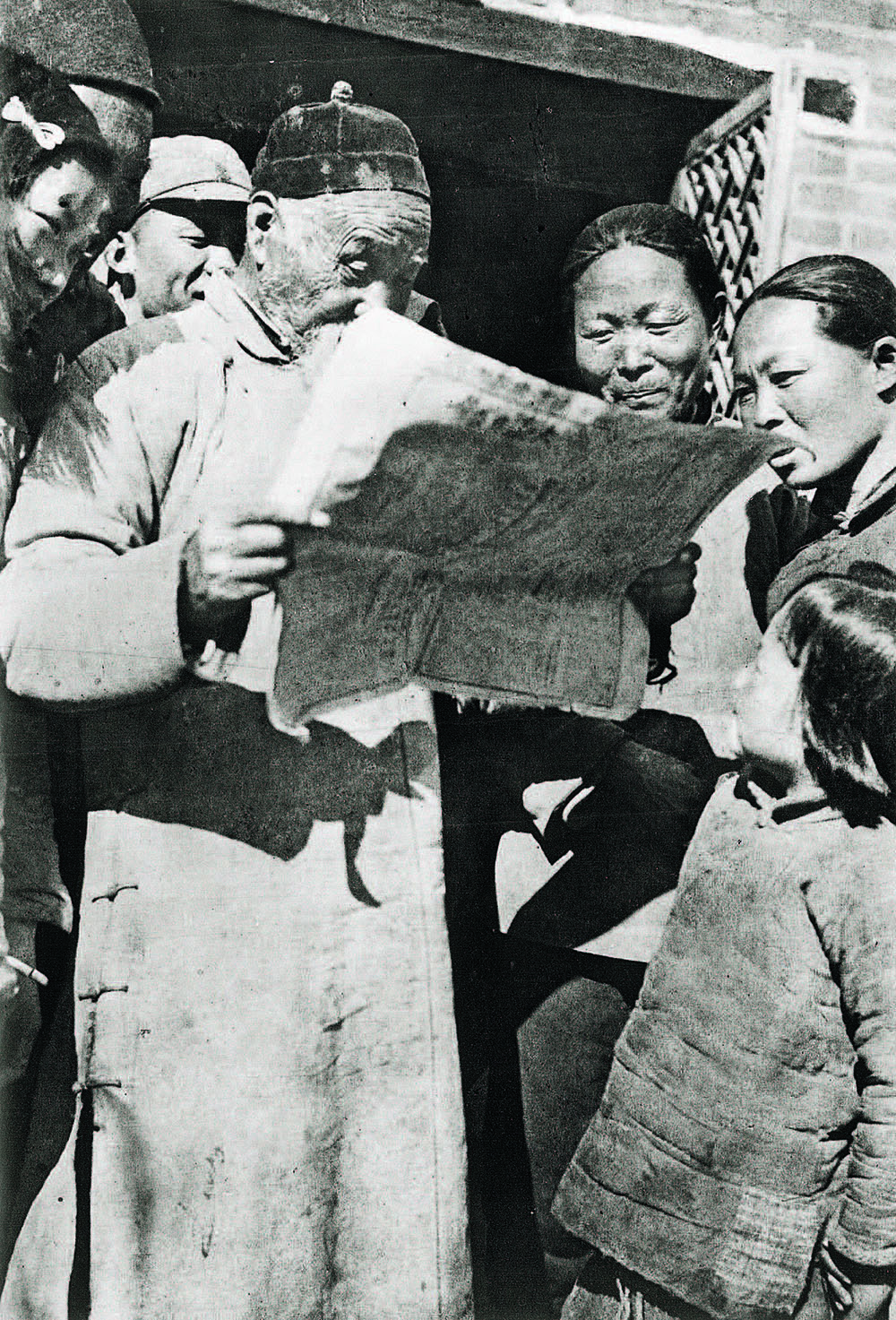
People in Shandong reading about Japan's surrender in a newspaper

Two days after Emperor Hirohito's surrender speech to civilians was broadcast, he delivered a shorter speech "To the officers and men of the imperial forces". He said,

Three years and eight months have elapsed since we declared war on the United States and Britain. During this time our beloved men of the army and navy, sacrificing their lives, have fought valiantly ..., and of this we are deeply grateful. Now that the Soviet Union has entered the war against us, to continue the war under the present internal and external conditions would be only to increase needlessly the ravages of war finally to the point of endangering the very foundation of the Empire's existence. With that in mind and although the fighting spirit of the Imperial Army and Navy is as high as ever, with a view to maintaining and protecting our noble national policy we are about to make peace with the United States, Britain, the Soviet Union and Chongqing. ... We trust that you officers and men of the Imperial forces will comply with our intention and will ... bear the unbearable and leave an everlasting foundation of the nation.

=== Occupation and the surrender ceremony ===
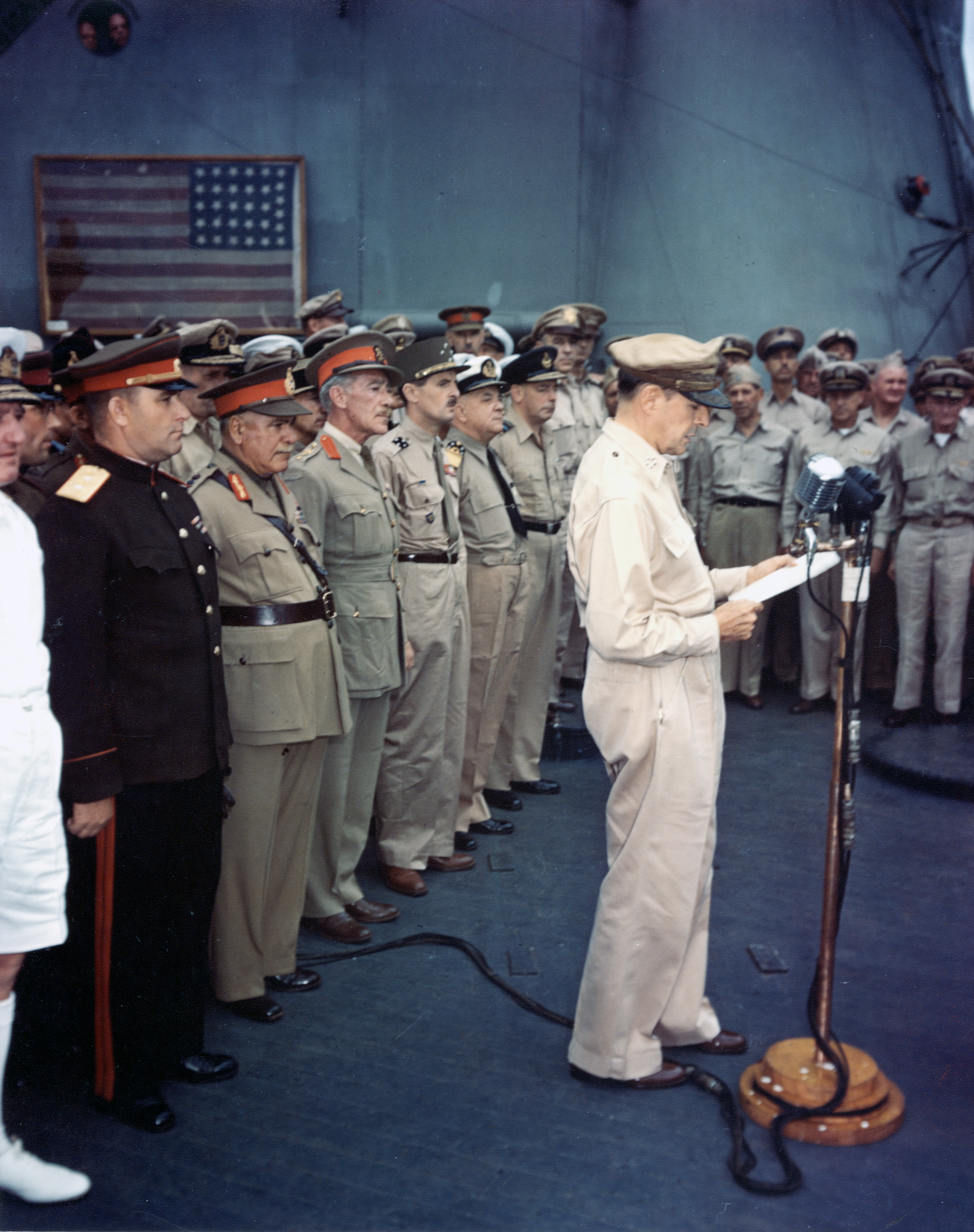
Douglas MacArthur at surrender ceremony. The flag flown by Matthew C. Perry is visible in the background.

News of the Japanese acceptance of the surrender terms was announced to the American public via radio at 7 p.m. Eastern War Time (EWT) on 14 August, sparking massive celebrations of the end of the war. A photograph, V-J Day in Times Square, of an American sailor kissing a woman in New York, and a news film of the Dancing Man in Sydney have come to epitomize the immediate celebrations. 14 and 15 August are commemorated as Victory over Japan Day in many Allied countries.

Japan's sudden surrender after the unexpected use of atomic weapons surprised most governments outside the US and UK. The Soviet Union had some intentions of occupying Hokkaido. Unlike the Soviet occupations of eastern Germany and northern Korea, however, these plans were frustrated by the opposition of President Truman. The Soviet Union continued to fight until early September, taking the Kuril Islands.

Japan's forces were still fighting against the Soviets as well as the Chinese on the Asian mainland, and managing their cease-fire and surrender was difficult. US B-32 Dominator bombers based in Okinawa began flying reconnaissance missions over Japan in order to monitor Japanese compliance with the cease-fire, gather information to better enable the establishment of the occupation, and test the fidelity of the Japanese, as it was feared that the Japanese were planning to attack occupation forces. During the first such B-32 reconnaissance mission, the bomber was tracked by Japanese radars but completed its mission without interference. On 18 August, a group of four B-32s overflying Tokyo were attacked by Japanese naval fighter aircraft from Naval Air Facility Atsugi and Yokosuka Naval Airfield. The Japanese pilots were acting without authorization from the Japanese government. They were either opposed to the cease-fire or believed that Japanese airspace should remain inviolate until a formal surrender document was signed. They caused only minor damage and were held at bay by the B-32 gunners. The incident surprised US commanders, and prompted them to send additional reconnaissance flights. The following day, two B-32s on a reconnaissance mission over Tokyo were attacked by Japanese fighter aircraft out of Yokosuka Naval Airfield, with the pilots again acting on their own initiative, damaging one bomber. One of the bomber's crewmen was killed and two others wounded. It was the last aerial engagement of the war. The following day, as per the terms of the cease-fire agreement, the propellers were removed from all Japanese aircraft and further Allied reconnaissance flights over Japan went unchallenged.

Japanese officials left for Manila on 19 August to meet Supreme Commander of the Allied Powers Douglas MacArthur, and to be briefed on his plans for the occupation. MacArthur had already issued General Order No. 1, instructing Japanese forces to surrender to designated Allied commanders. On 28 August, 150 US personnel flew to Atsugi, Kanagawa Prefecture, and the occupation of Japan began. They were followed by USS Missouri, whose accompanying vessels landed the 4th Marines on the southern coast of Kanagawa. The 11th Airborne Division was airlifted from Okinawa to Atsugi Airdrome, 50 km (30 mi) from Tokyo. Other Allied personnel followed.

MacArthur arrived in Tokyo on 30 August, and immediately decreed several laws: No Allied personnel were to assault Japanese people. No Allied personnel were to eat the scarce Japanese food. Flying the Hinomaru or "Rising Sun" flag was severely restricted, with individuals and prefectural offices allowed to fly it after applying for permission. The restriction was partially lifted in 1948 and completely lifted the following year.

The formal surrender occurred on 2 September 1945, around 9 a.m. Tokyo time, when Japanese representatives signed the Japanese Instrument of Surrender in Tokyo Bay aboard USS Missouri, accompanied by around 250 other allied vessels, including British and Australian navy vessels and a Dutch hospital ship. The surrender ceremony was carefully planned, detailing the seating positions of all Army, Navy, and Allied Representatives. The ceremony was filmed in color by George F. Kosco, but the footage was released publicly only in 2010. The future Prince Philip, Duke of Edinburgh watched the ceremony from HMS Whelp through binoculars.

Each signatory sat before an ordinary mess deck table covered with green felt and signed two unconditional Instruments of Surrender—a leather-bound version for the Allied forces and a canvas-backed version for the Japanese. Foreign Minister Mamoru Shigemitsu signed on behalf of the Japanese government followed by the uniformed General Yoshijiro Umezu, Chief of the Imperial General Staff. MacArthur signed on behalf of the Allied nations, followed by Fleet Admiral Chester W. Nimitz as U.S. Representative. Representatives of eight other Allied nations, led by Chinese representative General Xu Yongchang, followed Nimitz. Other notable signatories include Admiral Bruce Fraser for the United Kingdom, Generál-leytenánt Kuzma Derevyanko for the Soviet Union and Général d'armée Philippe Leclerc de Hauteclocque for France.

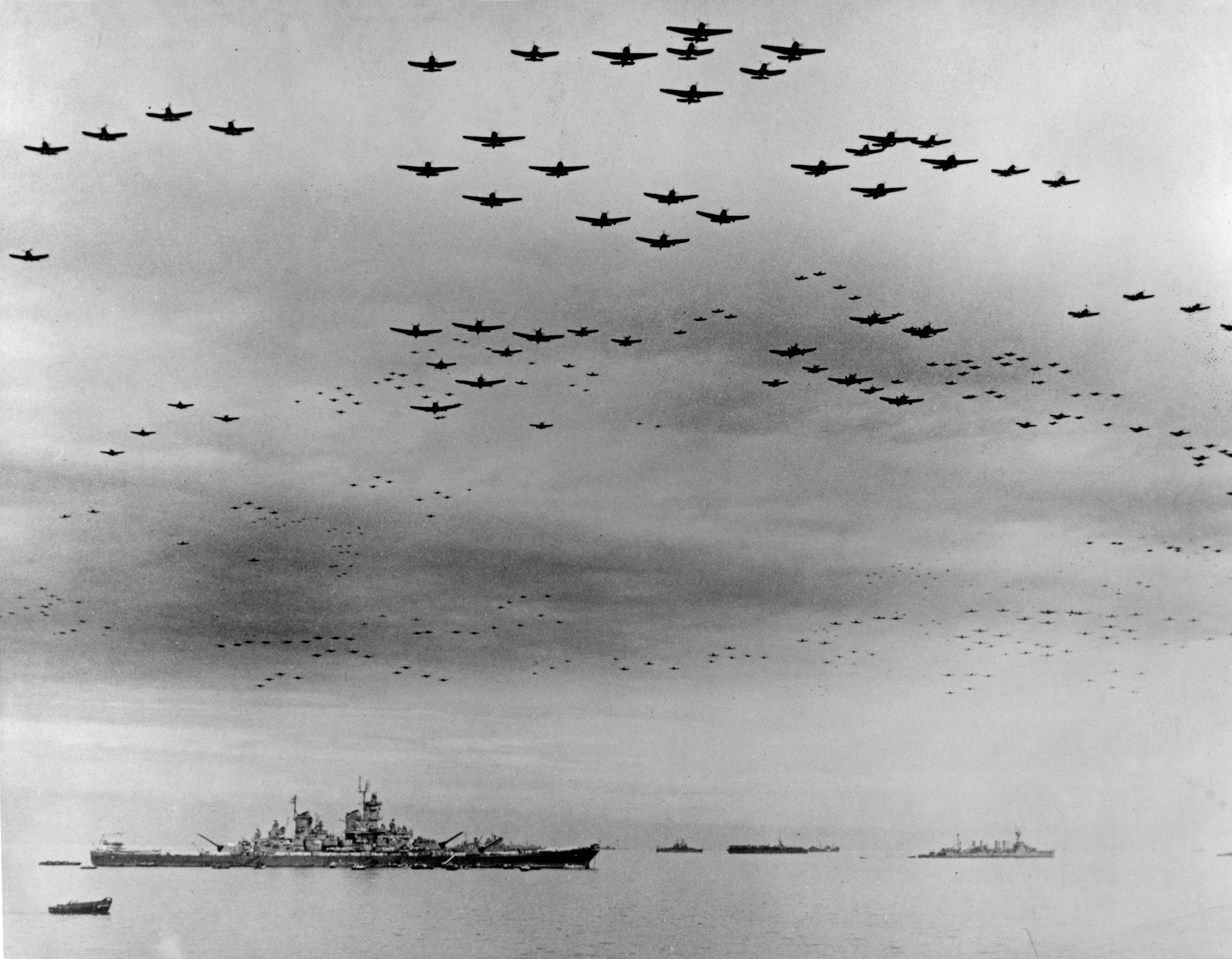
Part of the mass flypast on 2 September, over the Missouri (left)

On the Missouri that day was the same American flag that had been flown in 1853 on USS Powhatan by Commodore Matthew C. Perry on the first of his two expeditions to Japan. Perry's expeditions had resulted in the Convention of Kanagawa, which forced the Japanese to open the country to American trade. During the ceremony, US aircraft carriers and aircraft patrolled offshore, as there were fears of a kamikaze attack by Japanese pilots; no such attack occurred. The ceremony concluded with a flypast of over 800 US military aircraft, both from the carriers and including 462 land-based B-29 Superfortresses.

A nearly simultaneous surrender ceremony was held on 2 September aboard USS Portland at Truk Atoll, where Vice Admiral George D. Murray accepted the surrender of the Caroline Islands from senior Japanese military and civilian officials.

After the formal surrender on 2 September aboard Missouri, investigations into Japanese war crimes began quickly. Many members of the imperial family, such as the emperor's brothers Prince Chichibu, Prince Takamatsu and Prince Mikasa, and his uncle Prince Higashikuni, pressured the Emperor to abdicate so that one of the Princes could serve as regent until Crown Prince Akihito came of age. However, at a meeting with the Emperor later in September 1945, General MacArthur assured him he needed his help to govern Japan and so Hirohito was never tried. Legal procedures for the International Military Tribunal for the Far East were issued on 19 January 1946, without any member of the imperial family being prosecuted. However, Hirohito was later compelled by the Allied occupation authorities to renounce his divine status as a "living god" (akitsumikami) that shifted Japan toward a democratic, constitutional monarchy and reduced the role of the Emperor to a symbolic figurehead.

In addition to 14 and 15 August, 2 September 1945 is also known as V-J Day. President Truman declared 2 September to be V-J Day, but noted that "It is not yet the day for the formal proclamation of the end of the war nor of the cessation of hostilities." In Japan, 15 August is often called Shūsen-kinenbi (終戦記念日), which literally means the 'memorial day for the end of the war', but the government's name for the day (which is not a national holiday) is Senbotsusha o tsuitō shi heiwa o kinen suru hi (戦没者を追悼し平和を祈念する日, 'day for mourning of war dead and praying for peace').

== Further surrenders and resistance ==
Many further surrender ceremonies took place across Japan's remaining holdings in the Pacific.

In China, the surrender ceremony of the Second Sino-Japanese War took place in Nanking on 9 September 1945. During the ceremony, General Yasuji Okamura, Commander-in-Chief of the Chinese Expeditionary Force of the Imperial Japanese Army, signed the surrender document which was written in both Japanese and Chinese. The unconditional surrender were overseen and accepted by Kuomintang General He Yingqin, the Chinese representative of the Allies and the commander-in-chief of the Republic of China National Revolutionary Army along with British major-general Eric Hayes and other Allied representatives. The Kuomintang took over the administration of Taiwan on 25 October 1945.

Japanese forces in Southeast Asia surrendered on 2 September 1945, in Penang, 10 September in Labuan, 11 September in the Kingdom of Sarawak, 12 September in Singapore, 13 September in Kuala Lumpur, and 21 October in Padang. It was not until 1947 that all prisoners held by America and Britain were repatriated. As late as April 1949, China still held more than 60,000 Japanese prisoners. Some, such as Shozo Tominaga, were not repatriated until the late 1950s.

After Japan's capitulation, more than 5,400,000 Japanese soldiers and 1,800,000 Japanese sailors were taken prisoner by the Allies. The damage done to Japan's infrastructure, combined with a severe famine in 1946, further complicated the Allied efforts to feed the Japanese POWs and civilians.

The state of war between most of the Allies and Japan officially ended when the Treaty of San Francisco took effect on 28 April 1952. The same day, Japan formally made peace with the Republic of China with the signing of the Treaty of Taipei. Japan and the Soviet Union formally made peace four years later with the Soviet–Japanese Joint Declaration of 1956, even though the territorial status of the Kuril Islands remained in dispute to the present day.

Japanese holdouts, especially on small Pacific Islands, refused to surrender at all (believing the declaration to be propaganda or considering surrender against their code). Some may never have heard of it. Teruo Nakamura, the last known holdout, emerged from his hidden retreat in what was now independent Indonesia in December 1974, while two other Japanese soldiers, who had joined Communist guerrillas at the end of the war, fought in southern Thailand until 1990. One report suggests they fought until 1991.

Surrender ceremonies throughout the Pacific theater
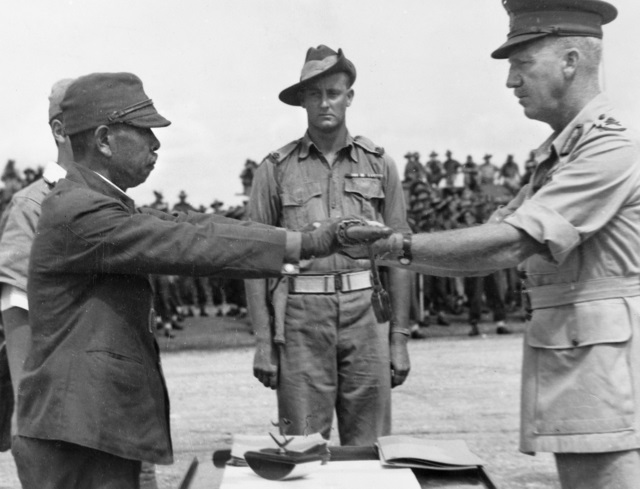
Hatazō Adachi, the commander of the Japanese 18th Army in New Guinea, surrenders his sword to the commander of the Australian 6th Division, Horace Robertson.

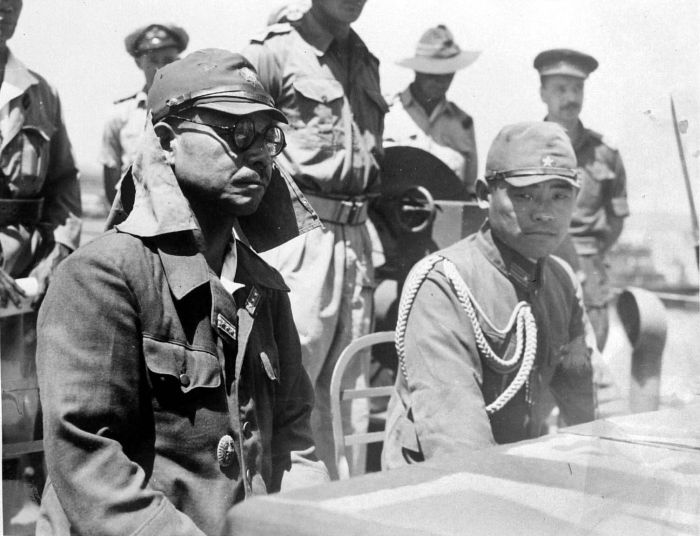
Kaida Tatsuichi, commander of the Japanese 4th Tank Regiment, and his chief of staff Shoji Minoru listen to the terms of surrender on HMAS Moresby at Timor.

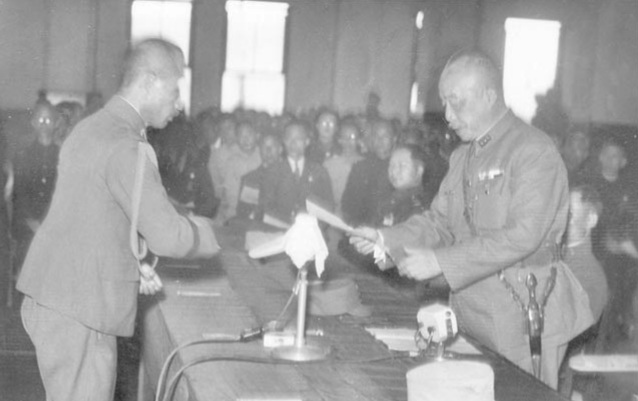
Chen Yi (right) accepting the receipt of Order No. 1 signed by Rikichi Andō (left), the last Japanese Governor-General of Taiwan, in Taipei City Hall

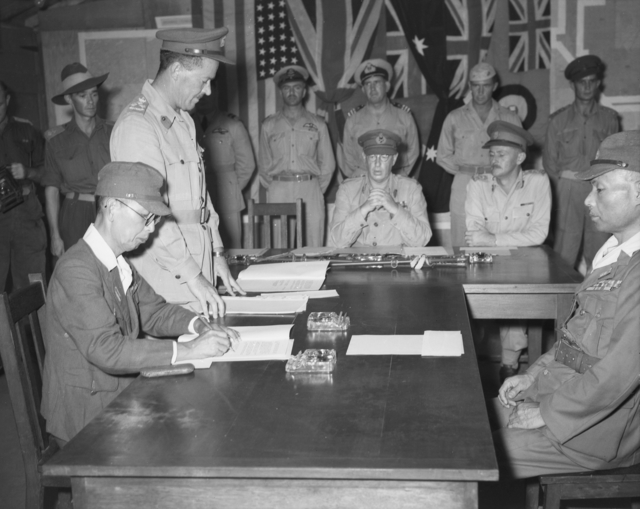
Masatane Kanda signs the instrument of surrender of Japanese forces on Bougainville Island, New Guinea.

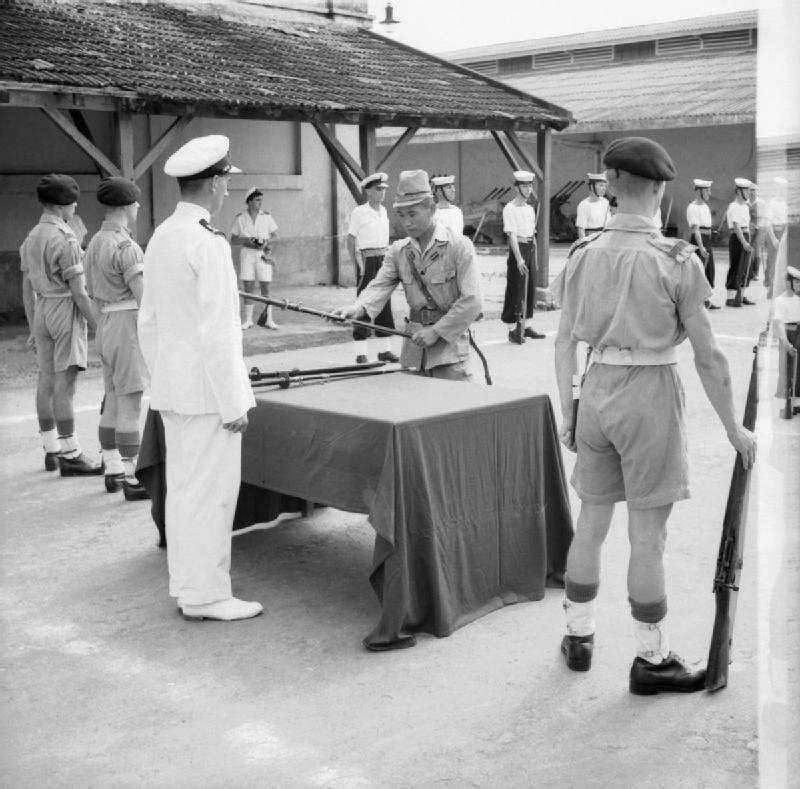
A Japanese officer surrenders his sword to a British Lieutenant in a ceremony in Saigon, French Indochina.

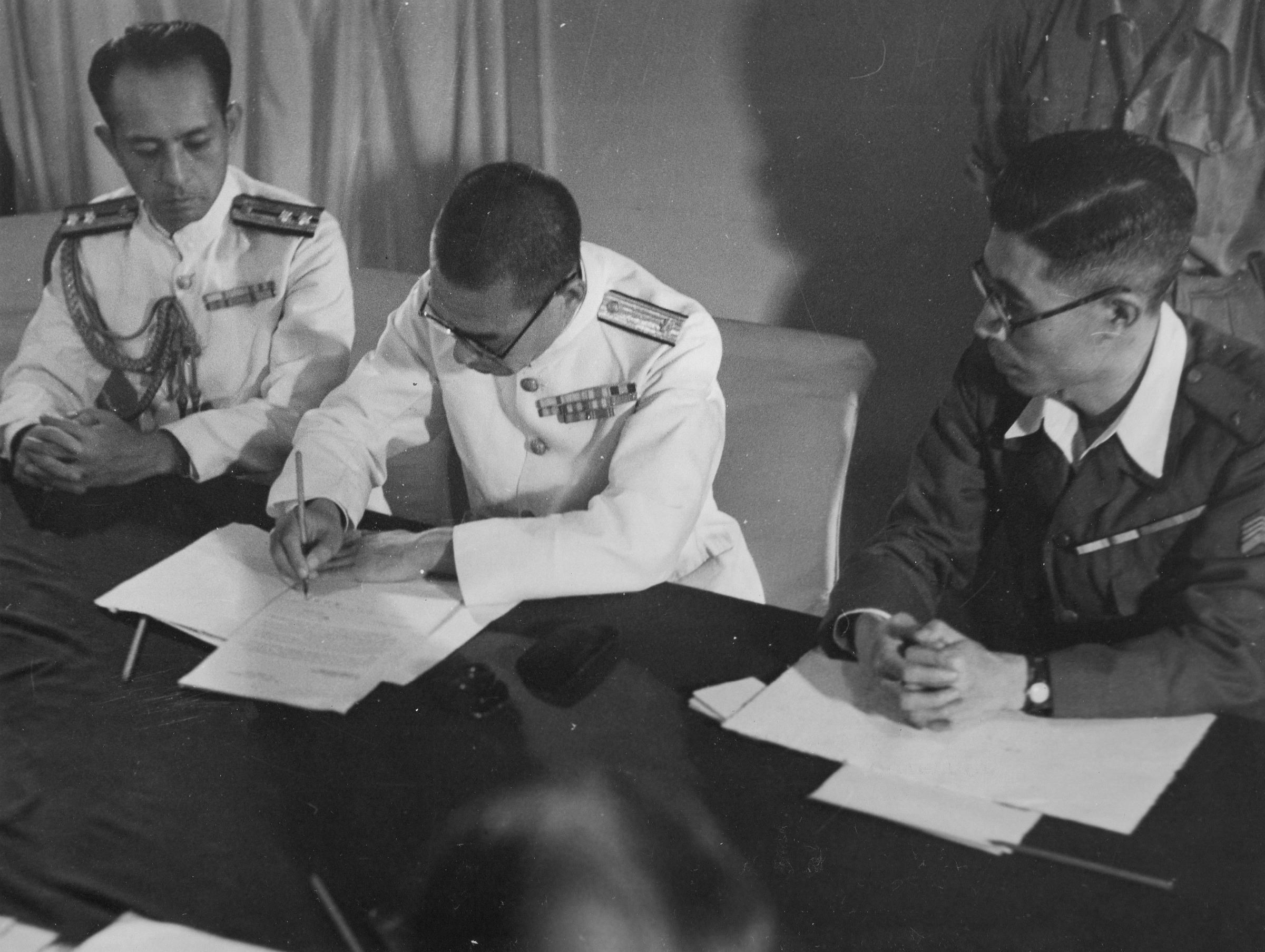
A Japanese Navy officer signing the surrender of Penang aboard HMS Nelson on 2 September 1945. Penang was liberated by the Royal Marines on the following day under Operation Jurist.

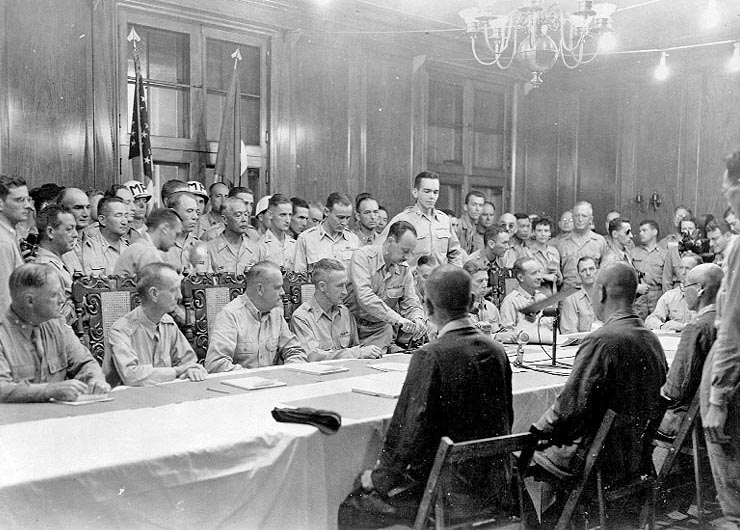
Surrender ceremony of the Japanese to American forces in the Philippines at what is now the residence of the US ambassador in Camp John Hay, Baguio on 3 September 1945

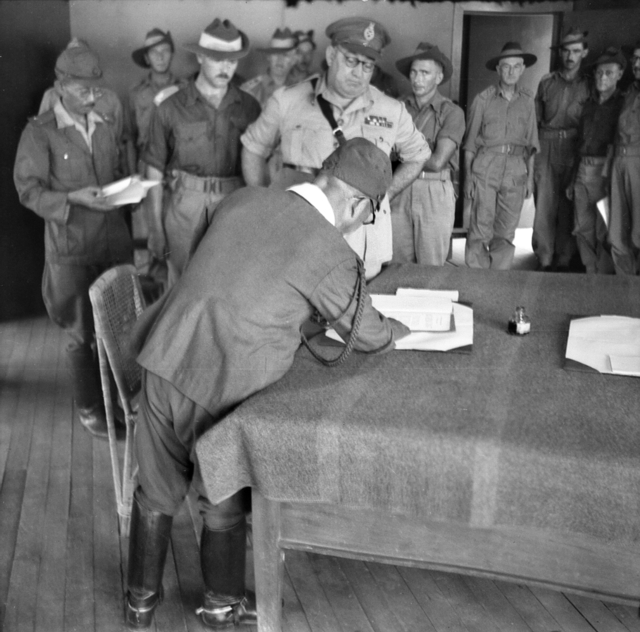
Masao Baba, Lieutenant General of the Japanese 37th Army signs the surrender document in Labuan, British Borneo, being watched by Australian Major General George Wootten and other Australian units.

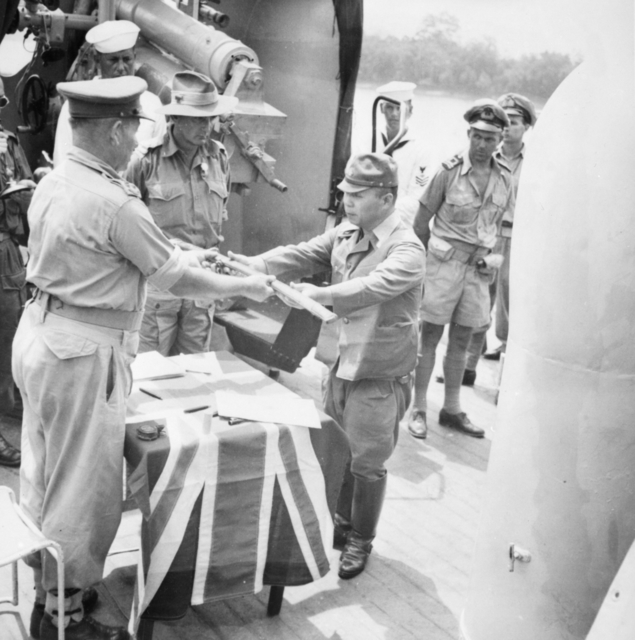
The official surrender ceremony of the Japanese to the Australian forces on board HMAS Kapunda at Kuching, Kingdom of Sarawak, on 11 September 1945

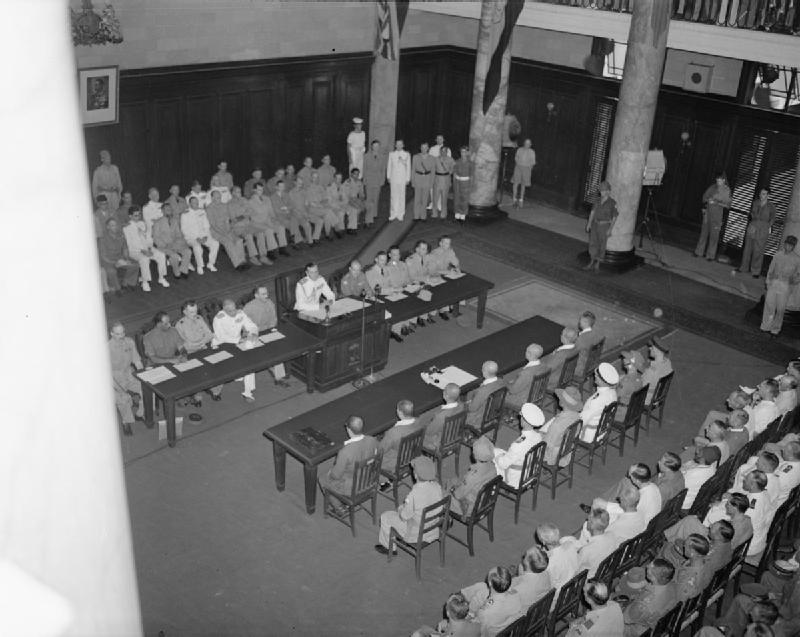
The Japanese Southern Armies surrender at Singapore on 12 September 1945. General Itagaki surrendered to the British represented by Lord Mountbatten at Municipal Hall, Singapore.

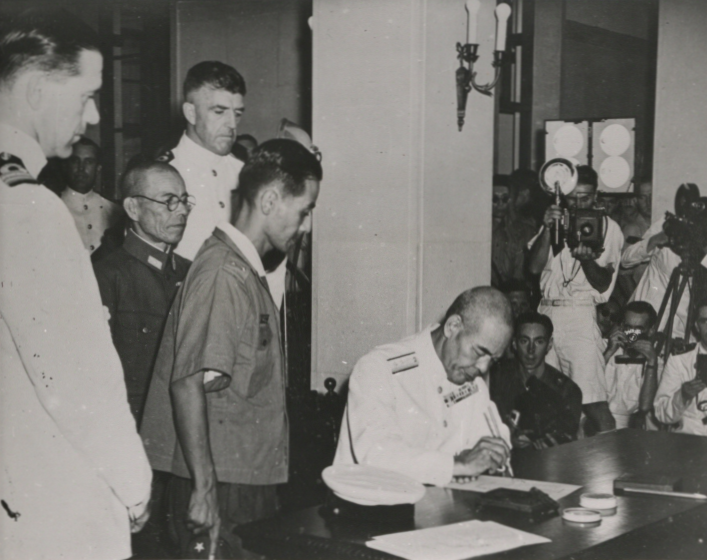
British Rear Admiral Sir Cecil Halliday Jepson Harcourt watching Japanese Vice Admiral Ruitako Fujita sign the document of surrender on 16 September 1945, in Hong Kong

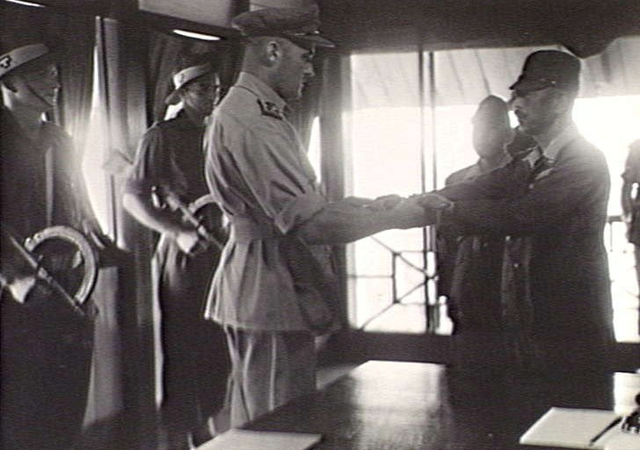
The surrender ceremony of the Japanese to the Australian forces at Keningau, British North Borneo, on 17 September 1945

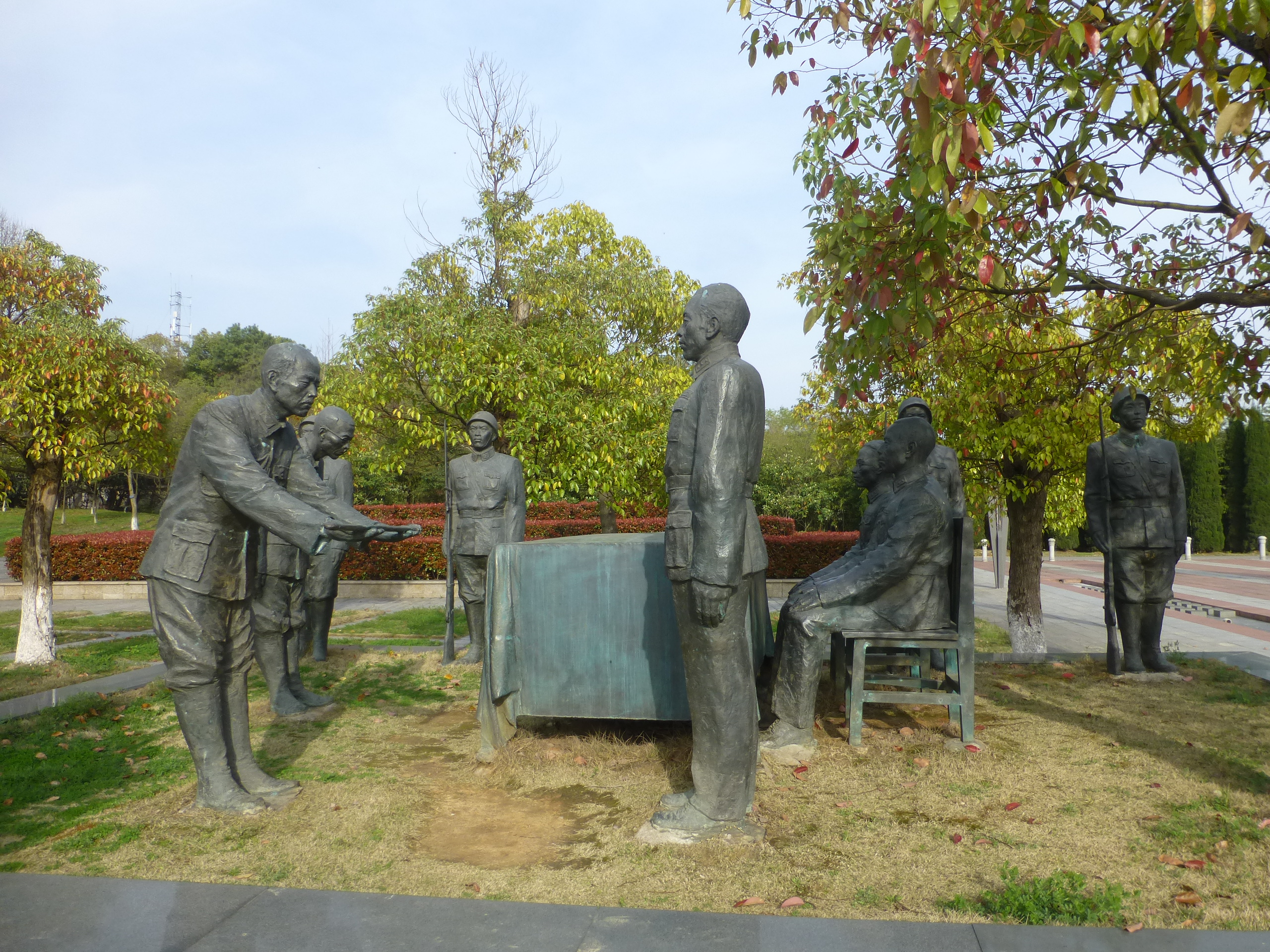
Statue of General Sun Weiru, commander of the Sixth War Zone of China, accepting the surrender of the Japanese troops in Central China from General Naozaburo Okabe, Wuhan, 18 September 1945.

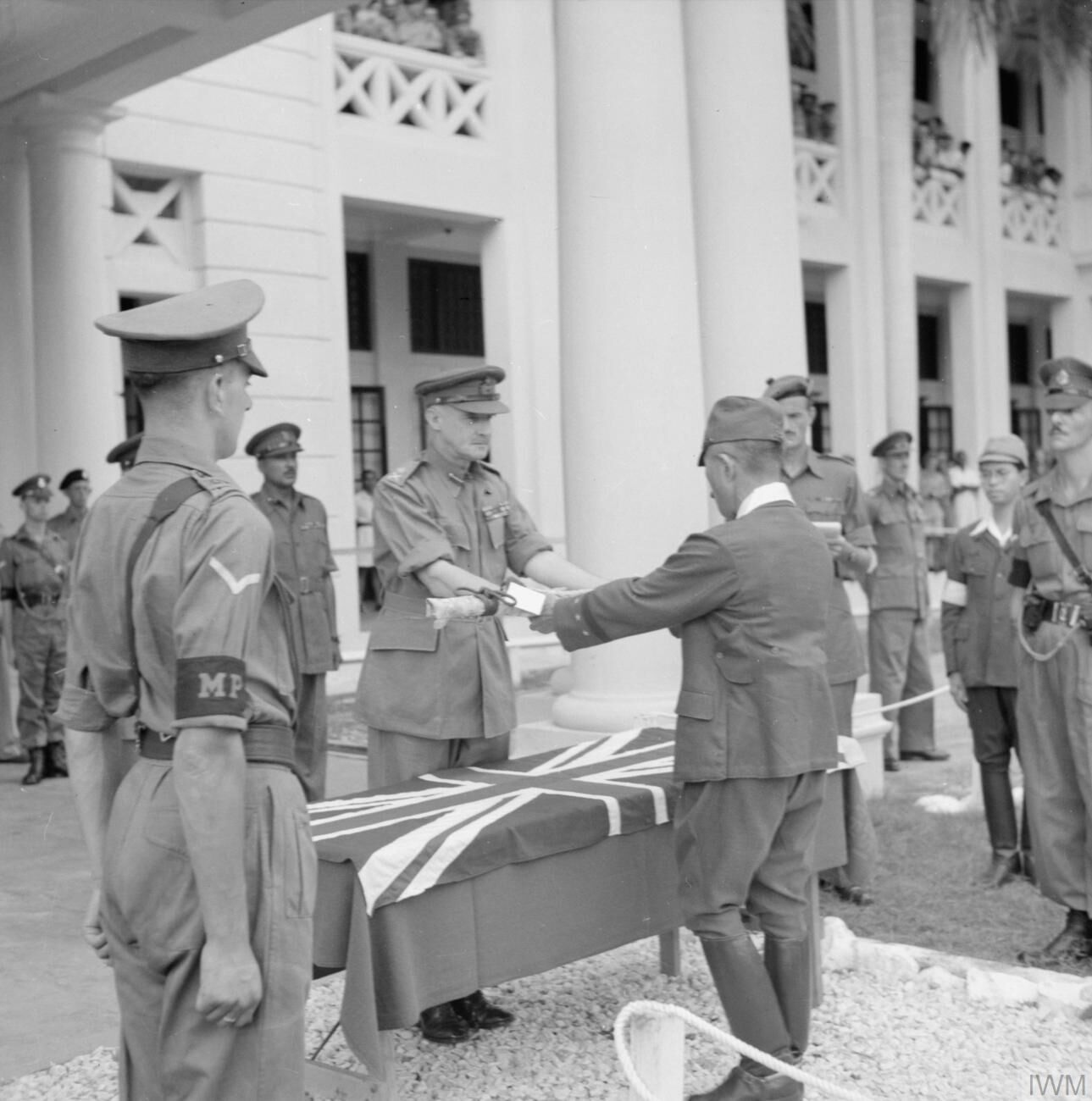
The surrender ceremony of the Japanese to the British forces with General Itagaki surrendering his sword to General Frank Messervy at Kuala Lumpur, British Malaya, on 22 February 1946.

Signing of the surrender documents by the Japanese 25th Army, led by Lieutenant General Moritake Tanabe and Major General Nakao Yahagi, to the British 26th Indian Infantry Division in Padang, Dutch East Indies, 21 October 1945

== See also ==
- Aftermath of World War II
- Hypothetical Axis victory in World War II
- Japanese American service in World War II
- Political dissidence in the Empire of Japan
- Japanese post-war economic miracle
- Post–World War II economic expansion
- Surrender of Germany
