= Debate over the atomic bombings of Hiroshima and Nagasaki =

Controversies surrounding nuclear attacks

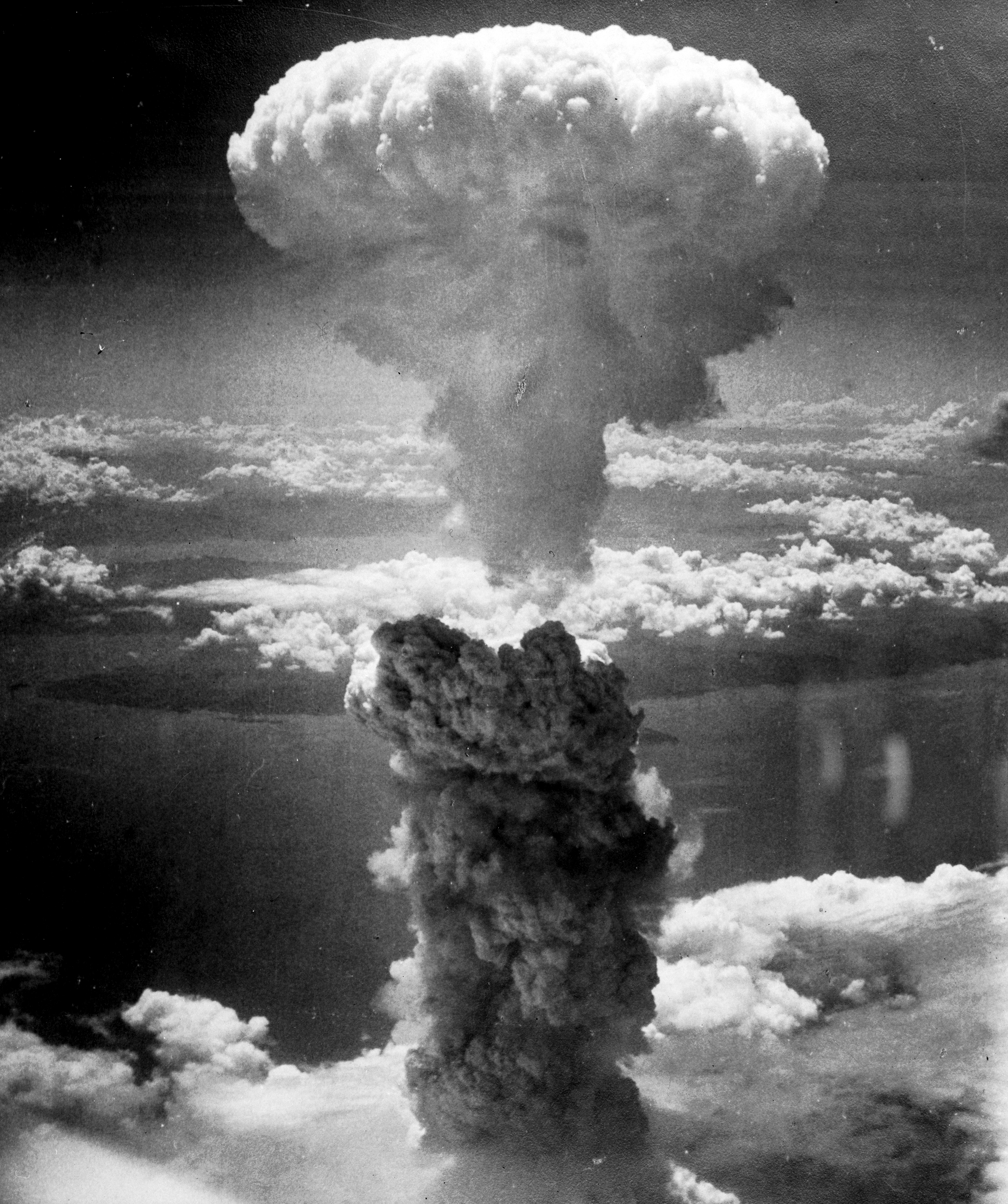
The Fat Man mushroom cloud resulting from the nuclear explosion over Nagasaki rises into the air from the hypocenter.

Substantial debate exists over the ethical, legal, and military aspects of the atomic bombings of Hiroshima and Nagasaki on 6 August and 9 August 1945 respectively at the close of the Pacific War theater of World War II (1939–45), as well as their lasting impact on both the United States and the international community. Topics include their military necessity toward ending the war in Asia, comparisons to the proposed Western Allied invasion of mainland Japan and the Soviet invasion of Manchuria, comparison to other strategic bombing in the war, and characterization as state terrorism or a war crime.

On 26 July 1945 at the Potsdam Conference, United States president Harry S. Truman, British prime minister Winston Churchill and President of China Chiang Kai-shek issued the Potsdam Declaration, which outlined the terms of surrender for the Empire of Japan. This ultimatum stated if Japan did not surrender, it would face "prompt and utter destruction".

Some debaters focus on the presidential decision-making process, and others on whether or not the bombings were the proximate cause of Japanese surrender. Over the course of time, different arguments have gained and lost support as new evidence has become available and as studies have been completed. There is also the debate on the role of the bombings in Japan's surrender and the U.S.'s justification for them based upon the premise that the bombings precipitated the surrender. This remains the subject of both scholarly and popular debate, with revisionist historians advancing a variety of arguments. In 2005, in an overview of historiography about the matter, J. Samuel Walker wrote, "the controversy over the use of the bomb seems certain to continue". Walker stated, "The fundamental issue that has divided scholars over a period of nearly four decades is whether the use of the bomb was necessary to achieve victory in the war in the Pacific on terms satisfactory to the United States."

Supporters of the bombings generally assert that they caused the Japanese surrender, preventing massive casualties on both sides in the planned invasion of Japan: Kyūshū was to be invaded in November 1945 and Honshū four months later. It was thought Japan would not surrender unless there was an overwhelming demonstration of destructive capability. Those who oppose the bombings argue it was militarily unnecessary, inherently immoral, a war crime, or a form of state terrorism. Critics believe a naval blockade and conventional bombings would have forced Japan to surrender unconditionally. Some critics believe Japan was more motivated to surrender by the Soviet Union's invasion of Manchuria, Sakhalin and Kuril Islands, which could have led to Soviet occupation of Hokkaido.

From outside the United States, debates have focused on questions about America's national character and morality, as well as doubts concerning its ongoing diplomatic and military policies. There is also a school of thought which condemns the bombing as a war crime or crime against humanity.

== Support ==
=== Prevention of many U.S. and Japanese military casualties ===
There are voices which assert that the bomb should never have been used at all. I cannot associate myself with such ideas. ... I am surprised that very worthy people—but people who in most cases had no intention of proceeding to the Japanese front themselves—should adopt the position that rather than throw this bomb, we should have sacrificed a million American and a quarter of a million British lives.

— Winston Churchill, leader of the Opposition, in a speech to the British House of Commons, August 1945

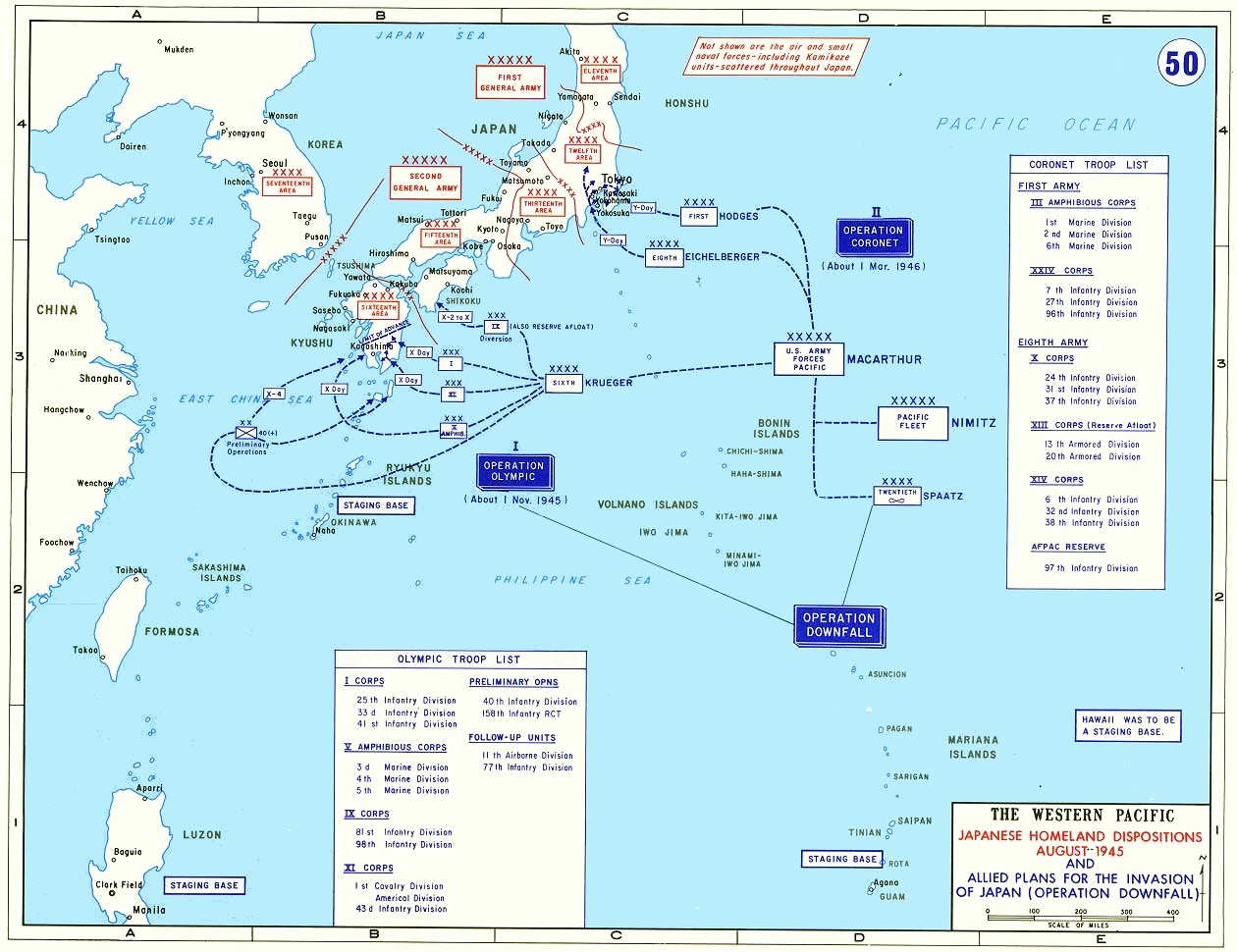
A map outlining the Japanese and U.S. (but not other Allied) ground forces scheduled to take part in the ground battle for Japan. Two landings were planned: (1) Olympic – the invasion of the southern island, Kyūshū, (2) Coronet – the invasion of the main island, Honshū.

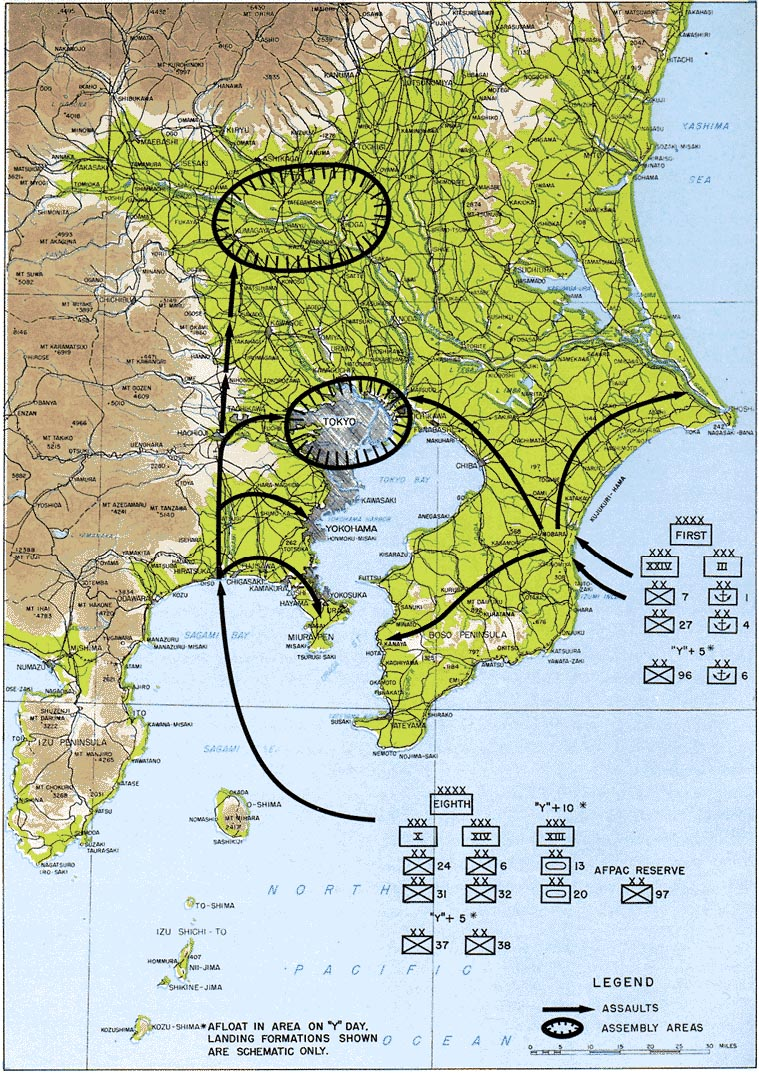
March 1946's Operation Coronet was planned to take Tokyo with a landing of 25 divisions, compared to D-Day's 12 divisions.

Those who argue in favor of the decision to drop the atomic bombs on enemy targets believe massive casualties on both sides would have occurred in Operation Downfall, the planned Allied invasion of Japan. The bulk of the force invading Japan would be American although the British Empire would contribute three divisions of troops (one each from the United Kingdom, Canada, and Australia).

The U.S. anticipated losing many combatants in Downfall, although the number of expected fatalities and wounded is subject to some debate. U.S. President Harry S. Truman stated in 1953 he had been advised U.S. casualties could range from 250,000 to one million combatants. Assistant Secretary of the Navy Ralph Bard, a member of the Interim Committee on atomic matters, stated that while meeting with Truman in the summer of 1945 they discussed the bomb's use in the context of massive combatant and non-combatant casualties from invasion, with Bard raising the possibility of a million Allied combatants being killed. As Bard opposed using the bomb without warning Japan first, he cannot be accused of exaggerating casualty expectations to justify the bomb's use, and his account is evidence that Truman was aware of, and government officials discussed, the possibility of one million casualties. However, other estimates were lower. For example, on June 18, 1945, General Douglas MacArthur, the commander of the invasion force, predicted 95,000 casualties (a third of those deaths) in the first 90 days of the invasion.

A quarter of a million casualties is roughly the level the Joint War Plans Committee estimated, in its paper (JWPC 369/1) prepared for Truman's 18 June meeting. A review of documents from the Truman Library shows Truman's initial draft response to the query describes General Marshall only as saying "one quarter of a million would be the minimum". The "as much as a million" phrase was added to the final draft by Truman's staff, so as not to appear to contradict an earlier statement given in a published article by Stimson (former Secretary of War). In a study done by the Joint Chiefs of Staff in April 1945, the figures of 7.45 casualties per 1,000 man-days and 1.78 fatalities per 1,000 man-days were developed. This implied the two planned campaigns to conquer Japan would cost 1.6 million U.S. casualties, including 380,000 dead. JWPC 369/1 (prepared June 15, 1945) which provided planning information to the Joint Chiefs of Staff, estimated an invasion of Japan would result in 40,000 U.S. dead and 150,000 wounded. Delivered on June 15, 1945, after insight gained from the Battle of Okinawa, the study noted Japan's inadequate defenses resulting from a very effective sea blockade and the Allied firebombing campaign. Generals George C. Marshall and Douglas MacArthur signed documents agreeing with the Joint War Plans Committee estimate.

In addition, a large number of Japanese combatant and non-combatant casualties were expected as a result of such actions. Contemporary estimates of Japanese deaths from an invasion of the Home Islands range from several hundreds of thousands to as high as ten million. General MacArthur's staff provided an estimated range of American deaths depending on the duration of the invasion, and also estimated a 22:1 ratio of Japanese to American deaths. From this, a low figure of somewhat more than 200,000 Japanese deaths can be calculated for a short invasion of two weeks, and almost three million Japanese deaths if the fighting lasted four months. A widely cited estimate of five to ten million Japanese deaths came from a study by William Shockley and Quincy Wright; the upper figure was used by Assistant Secretary of War John J. McCloy, who characterized it as conservative. Some 400,000 additional Japanese deaths might have occurred in the expected Soviet invasion of Hokkaido, the northernmost of Japan's main islands, An Air Force Association webpage states that "Millions of women, old men, and boys and girls had been trained to resist by such means as attacking with bamboo spears and strapping explosives to their bodies and throwing themselves under advancing tanks." The AFA noted that "[t]he Japanese cabinet had approved a measure extending the draft to include men from ages fifteen to sixty and women from seventeen to forty-five (an additional 28 million people)".

The great loss of life during the Battle of Iwo Jima and other Pacific islands gave U.S. leaders an idea of the casualties that would happen with a mainland invasion. Of the 22,060 Japanese combatants entrenched on Iwo Jima, 21,844 died either from fighting or by ritual suicide. Only 216 Japanese POWs were held at the hand of the Americans during the battle. According to the official Navy Department Library website, "The 36-day (Iwo Jima) assault resulted in more than 26,000 American casualties, including 6,800 dead" with 19,217 wounded. To put this into context, the 82-day Battle of Okinawa lasted from early April until mid-June 1945 and U.S. casualties (out of five Army and two Marine divisions) were above 62,000, of which more than 12,000 were killed or missing.

The U.S. military had nearly 500,000 Purple Heart medals manufactured in anticipation of potential casualties from the planned invasion of Japan. To date, all American military casualties of the 60 years following the end of World War II, including the Korean and Vietnam Wars, have not exceeded that number. In 2003, there were still 120,000 of these Purple Heart medals in stock. Because of the number available, combat units in Iraq and Afghanistan were able to keep Purple Hearts on hand for immediate award to wounded soldiers on the field.

=== Expedited end of war saved lives ===
Supporters of the bombings argue waiting for the Japanese to surrender would also have cost lives. "For China alone, depending upon what number one chooses for overall Chinese casualties, in each of the ninety-seven months between July 1937 and August 1945, somewhere between 100,000 and 200,000 persons perished, the vast majority of them noncombatants. For the other Asian states alone, the average probably ranged in the tens of thousands per month, but the actual numbers were almost certainly greater in 1945, notably due to the mass death in a famine in Vietnam."

The end of the war limited the expansion of the Japanese controlled Vietnamese famine of 1945, stopping it at 1–2 million deaths and also liberated millions of Allied prisoners of war and civilian laborers working in harsh conditions under a forced mobilization. In the Dutch East Indies, there was a "forced mobilization of some 4 million—although some estimates are as high as 10 million—romusha (manual labourers) ... About 270,000 romusha were sent to the Outer Islands and Japanese-held territories in Southeast Asia, where they joined other Asians in performing wartime construction projects. At the end of the war, only 52,000 were repatriated to Java."

Supporters also point to an order given by the Japanese War Ministry on August 1, 1944, ordering the execution of Allied POWs, "when an uprising of large numbers cannot be suppressed without the use of firearms" or when the POW camp was in the combat zone, in fear that "escapees from the camp may turn into a hostile fighting force". The only existing original copy of this general order was found by Jack Edwards after the war, in the ruins of the Kinkaseki prisoner of war camp in Formosa.

The Operation Meetinghouse firebombing raid on Tokyo alone killed 100,000 civilians on the night of March 9–10, 1945, causing more civilian death and destruction than either of the atomic bombs dropped on Hiroshima and Nagasaki. A total of 350,000 civilians died in the incendiary raids on 67 Japanese cities. Because the United States Army Air Forces wanted to use its fission bombs on previously undamaged cities in order to have accurate data on nuclear-caused damage, Kokura, Hiroshima, Nagasaki, and Niigata were preserved from conventional bombing raids. Otherwise, they would all have been firebombed. Intensive conventional bombing would have continued or increased prior to an invasion. The submarine blockade and the United States Army Air Forces's mining operation, Operation Starvation, had effectively cut off Japan's imports. A complementary operation against Japan's railways was about to begin, isolating the cities of southern Honshū from the food grown elsewhere in the Home Islands. "Immediately after the defeat, some estimated that 10 million people were likely to starve to death", noted historian Daikichi Irokawa. Meanwhile, fighting continued in the Philippines, New Guinea and Borneo, and offensives were scheduled for September in southern China and Malaya. The Soviet invasion of Manchuria had, in the week before the surrender, caused over 80,000 deaths.

In September 1945, nuclear physicist Karl Taylor Compton, who himself took part in the Manhattan Project, visited MacArthur's headquarters in Tokyo, and following his visit wrote a defensive article, in which he summarized his conclusions as follows:

If the atomic bomb had not been used, evidence like that I have cited points to the practical certainty that there would have been many more months of death and destruction on an enormous scale.

Philippine justice Delfín Jaranilla, member of the Tokyo tribunal, wrote in his judgment:

If a means is justified by an end, the use of the atomic bomb was justified for it brought Japan to her knees and ended the horrible war. If the war had gone longer, without the use of the atomic bomb, how many thousands and thousands of helpless men, women and children would have needlessly died and suffered ...?

According to military scholar Sarah Paine, the bombings likely saved millions of lives, as a quick end to the war enabled the resumption of food shipping which prevented further famine.

=== Part of total war ===
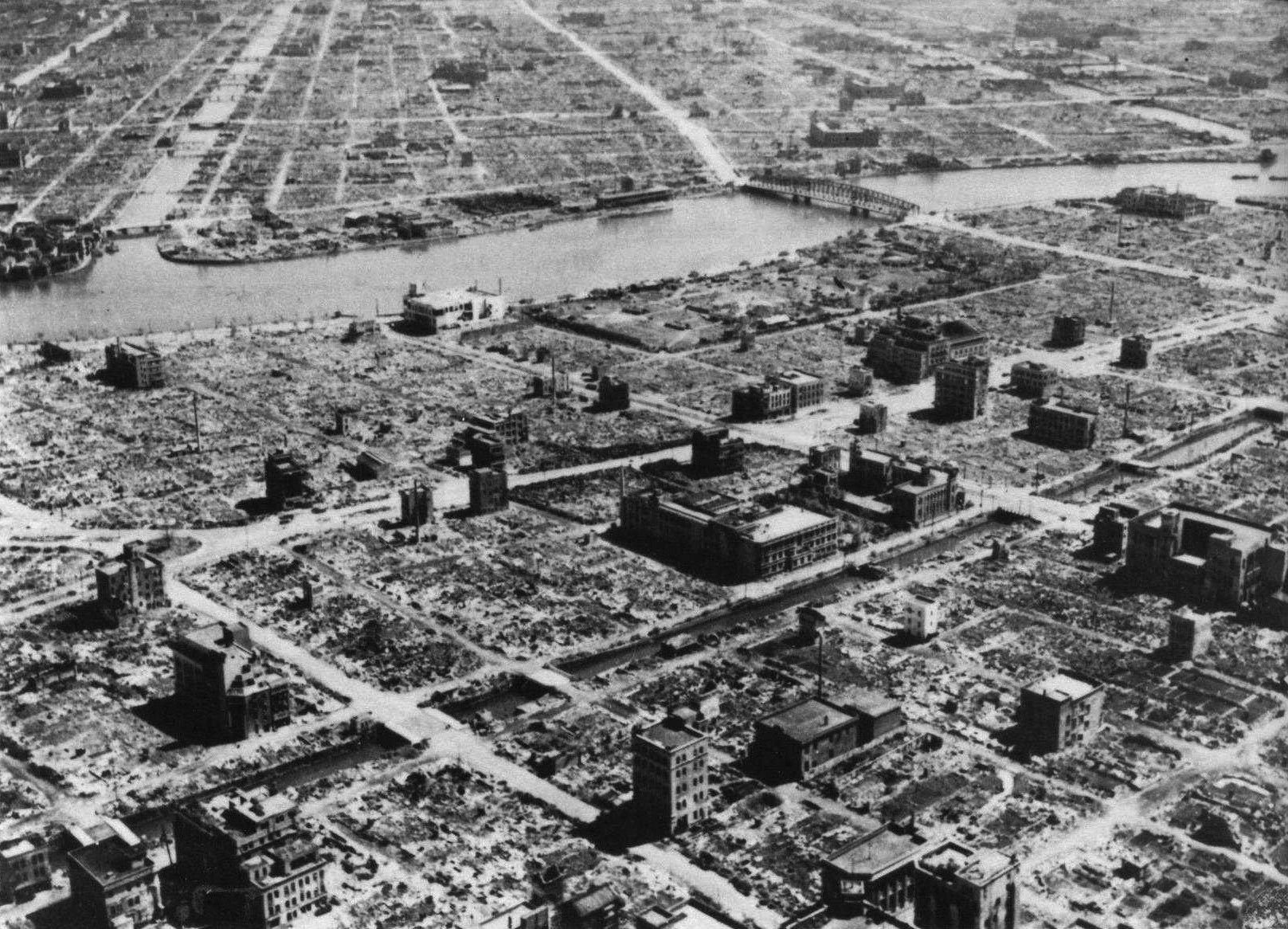
This Tokyo residential section was virtually destroyed following the Operation Meetinghouse fire-bombing of Tokyo on the night of 9/10 March 1945, which was the single deadliest air raid in human history; with a greater loss of life than the nuclear bombings of Hiroshima or Nagasaki as single events or a greater civilian death toll and area of fire damage than both nuclear bombings combined.

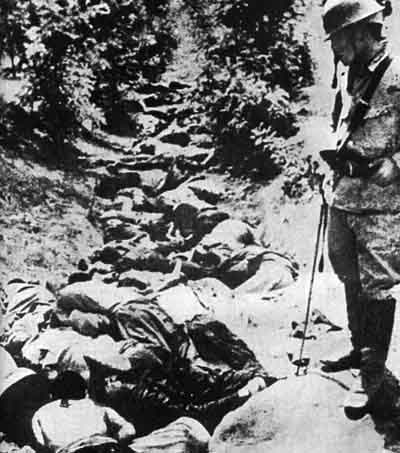
Chinese civilians massacred during Japan's campaign of total war in Xuzhou

Supporters of the bombings have argued the Japanese government had promulgated a National Mobilization Law and waged total war, ordering many civilians (including women, children, and old people) to work in factories and other infrastructure attached to the war effort and to fight against any invading force. Unlike the United States and Nazi Germany, over 90% of the Japanese war production was done in unmarked workshops and cottage industries which were widely dispersed within residential areas in cities and thus making them more extensively difficult to find and attack. In addition, the dropping of high explosives with precision bombing was unable to penetrate Japan's dispersed industry, making it entirely impossible to destroy them without causing widespread damage to surrounding areas. General Curtis LeMay stated why he ordered the systematic carpet bombing of Japanese cities:

We were going after military targets. No point in slaughtering civilians for the mere sake of slaughter. Of course there is a pretty thin veneer in Japan, but the veneer was there. It was their system of dispersal of industry. All you had to do was visit one of those targets after we'd roasted it, and see the ruins of a multitude of houses, with a drill press sticking up through the wreckage of every home. The entire population got into the act and worked to make those airplanes or munitions of war ... men, women, children. We knew we were going to kill a lot of women and kids when we burned [a] town. Had to be done.

For six months prior to the combat use of nuclear weapons, the United States Army Air Forces under LeMay's command undertook a major strategic bombing campaign against Japanese cities through the use of incendiary bombs, destroying 67 cities and killing an estimated 350,000 civilians. The Operation Meetinghouse raid on Tokyo on the night of 9/10 March 1945 stands as the deadliest air raid in human history, killing 100,000 civilians and destroying 16 square miles (41 km^{2}) of the city that night. The attack caused more civilian deaths and damage to urbanized land than any other single air attack, including the atomic bombings of Hiroshima and Nagasaki combined.

Colonel Harry F. Cunningham, an intelligence officer of the Fifth Air Force, noted that in addition to civilians producing weapons of war in cities, the Japanese government created a large civilian militia organization in order to train millions of civilians to be armed and to resist the American invaders. In his official intelligence review on July 21, 1945, he declared that:

The entire population of Japan is a proper military target ... There are no civilians in Japan. We are making war and making it in the all-out fashion which saves American lives, shortens the agony which war is and seeks to bring about an enduring peace. We intend to seek out and destroy the enemy wherever he or she is, in the greatest possible numbers, in the shortest possible time.

Supporters of the bombings have emphasized the strategic significance of the targets. Hiroshima was used as headquarters of the Second General Army and Fifth Division, which commanded the defense of southern Japan with 40,000 combatants stationed in the city. The city was also a communication center, an assembly area for combatants, a storage point, and had major industrial factories and workshops as well, and its air defenses consisted of five batteries of 7-cm and 8-cm (2.8 and 3.1 inch) anti-aircraft guns. Nagasaki was of great wartime importance because of its wide-ranging industrial activity, including the production of ordnance, warships, military equipment, and other war material. The city's air defenses consisted of four batteries of 7 cm (2.8 in) anti-aircraft guns and two searchlight batteries. An estimated 110,000 people were killed in the atomic bombings, including 20,000 Japanese combatants and 20,000 Korean slave laborers in Hiroshima and 23,145–28,113 Japanese factory workers, 2,000 Korean slave laborers, and 150 Japanese combatants in Nagasaki.

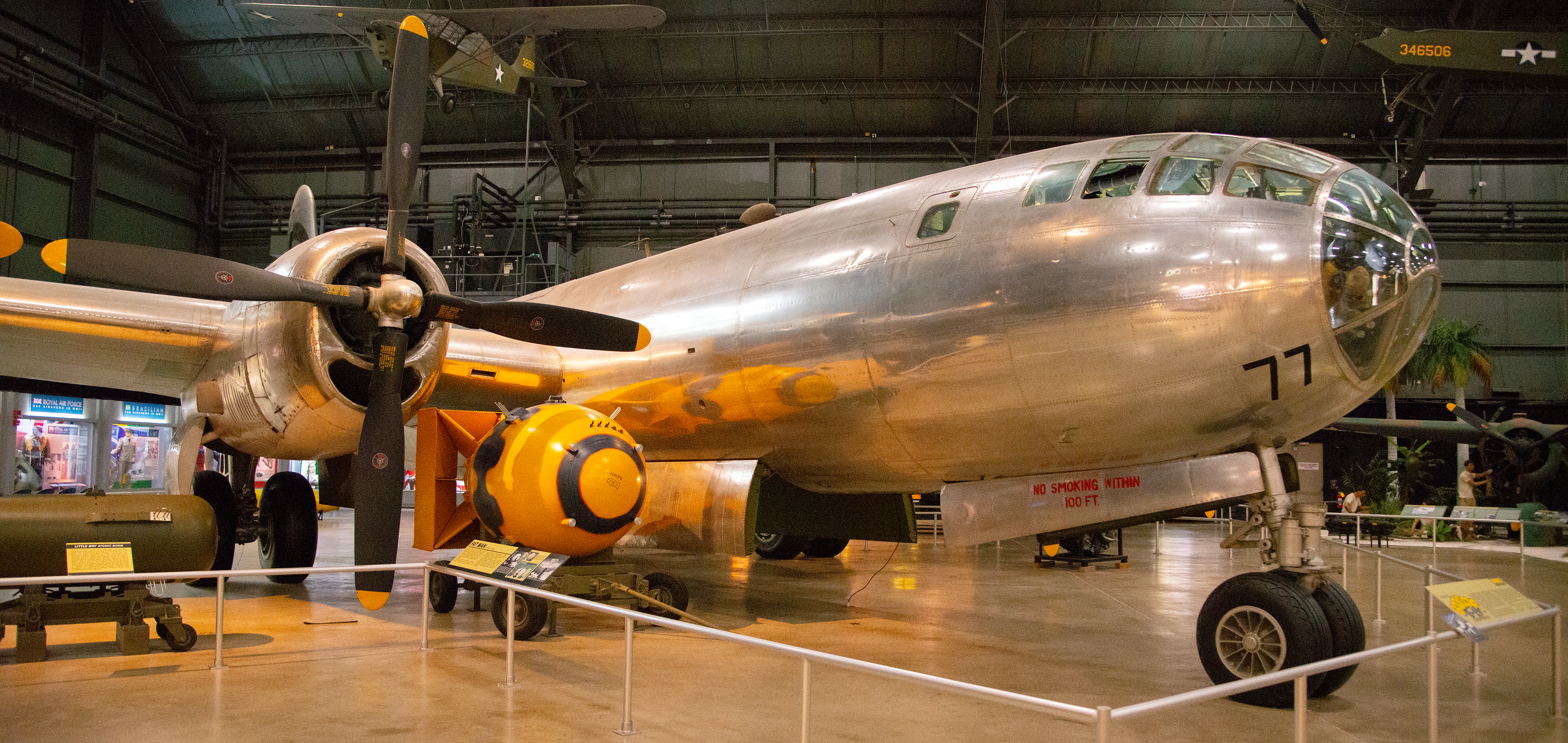
The Bockscar B-29 that was used to deliver the Fat Man bomb to Nagasaki and a post war Mk III nuclear weapon painted to resemble the Fat Man

On 30 June 2007, Japan's defense minister Fumio Kyūma said the dropping of atomic bombs on Japan by the United States during World War II was an inevitable way to end the war. Kyūma said: "I now have come to accept in my mind that in order to end the war, it could not be helped (shikata ga nai) that an atomic bomb was dropped on Nagasaki and that countless numbers of people suffered great tragedy." Kyūma, who is from Nagasaki, said the bombing caused great suffering in the city, but he does not resent the U.S. because it prevented the Soviet Union from entering the war with Japan. Kyūma's comments were similar to those made by Emperor Hirohito when, in his first ever press conference given in Tokyo in 1975, he was asked what he thought of the bombing of Hiroshima, and answered: "It's very regrettable that nuclear bombs were dropped and I feel sorry for the citizens of Hiroshima but it couldn't be helped (shikata ga nai) because that happened in wartime."

In early July 1945, on his way to Potsdam, Truman had re-examined the decision to use the bomb. In the end, he made the decision to drop the atomic bombs on strategic cities. His stated intention in ordering the bombings was to save American lives, to bring about a quick resolution of the war by inflicting destruction, and instilling fear of further destruction, sufficient to cause Japan to surrender. In his speech to the Japanese people presenting his reasons for surrender on August 15, the Emperor referred specifically to the atomic bombs, stating if they continued to fight it would not only result in "an ultimate collapse and obliteration of the Japanese nation, but also it would lead to the total extinction of human civilization".

Commenting on the use of the atomic bomb, then-U.S. Secretary of War Henry L. Stimson stated, "The atomic bomb was more than a weapon of terrible destruction; it was a psychological weapon."

In 1959, Mitsuo Fuchida, the pilot who led the first wave in the surprise attack on Pearl Harbor, met with General Paul Tibbets, who piloted the Enola Gay that dropped the atomic bomb on Hiroshima, and told him that:

You did the right thing. You know the Japanese attitude at that time, how fanatic they were, they'd die for the Emperor ... Every man, woman, and child would have resisted that invasion with sticks and stones if necessary ... Can you imagine what a slaughter it would be to invade Japan? It would have been terrible. The Japanese people know more about that than the American public will ever know.

Former U.S. Secretary of Defense Robert McNamara, who worked as a USAAF statistic bomber analyst under LeMay's command at the time, stated in the documentary The Fog of War that brute force was sometimes necessary to quickly end the war:

I remember reading that General Sherman in the Civil War. The mayor of Atlanta pleaded with him to save the city. And Sherman essentially said to the mayor just before he torched it and burned it down: "War is cruel. War is cruelty." That was the way LeMay felt. He was trying to save the country. He was trying to save our nation. And in the process, he was prepared to do whatever killing was necessary. It's a very, very difficult position for sensitive human beings to be in.

=== Japan's leaders refused to surrender ===
Some historians see ancient Japanese warrior traditions as a major factor in the resistance in the Japanese military to the idea of surrender. According to one Air Force account,

The Japanese code of Bushido—the way of the warrior'—was deeply ingrained. The concept of Yamato-damashii equipped each soldier with a strict code: never be captured, never break down, and never surrender. Surrender was dishonorable. Each soldier was trained to fight to the death and was expected to die before suffering dishonor. Defeated Japanese leaders preferred to take their own lives in the painful samurai ritual of seppuku (called hara kiri in the West). Warriors who surrendered were deemed not worthy of regard or respect.

Japanese militarism was aggravated by the Great Depression, and had resulted in countless assassinations of reformers attempting to check military power, among them Takahashi Korekiyo, Saitō Makoto, and Inukai Tsuyoshi. This created an environment in which opposition to war was a much riskier endeavor.

According to historian Richard B. Frank,

The intercepts of Imperial Japanese Army and Navy messages disclosed without exception that Japan's armed forces were determined to fight a final Armageddon battle in the homeland against an Allied invasion. The Japanese called this strategy Ketsu Go (Operation Decisive). It was founded on the premise that American morale was brittle and could be shattered by heavy losses in the initial invasion. American politicians would then gladly negotiate an end to the war [based on terms] far more generous than unconditional surrender.

The United States Department of Energy's history of the Manhattan Project lends some credence to these claims, saying that military leaders in Japan

also hoped that if they could hold out until the ground invasion of Japan began, they would be able to inflict so many casualties on the Allies that Japan still might win some sort of negotiated settlement.

While some members of the civilian leadership did use covert diplomatic channels to attempt peace negotiation, they could not negotiate surrender or even a cease-fire. Japan could legally enter into a peace agreement only with the unanimous support of the Japanese cabinet, and in the summer of 1945, the Japanese Supreme War Council, consisting of representatives of the Army, the Navy, and the civilian government, could not reach a consensus on how to proceed.

A political stalemate developed between the military and civilian leaders of Japan, the military increasingly determined to fight despite all costs and odds and the civilian leadership seeking a way to negotiate an end to the war. Further complicating the decision was the fact no cabinet could exist without the representative of the Imperial Japanese Army. This meant the Army or Navy could veto any decision by having its Minister resign, thus making them the most powerful posts on the SWC. In early August 1945, the cabinet was equally split between those who advocated an end to the war on one condition, the preservation of the kokutai, and those who insisted on three other conditions:

1. Leave disarmament and demobilization to Imperial General Headquarters
2. No occupation of the Japanese Home Islands, Korea, or Formosa
3. Delegation to the Japanese government of the punishment of war criminals

The "hawks" consisted of General Korechika Anami, General Yoshijirō Umezu, and Admiral Soemu Toyoda and were led by Anami. The "doves" consisted of Prime Minister Kantarō Suzuki, Naval Minister Mitsumasa Yonai, and Minister of Foreign Affairs Shigenori Tōgō and were led by Togo. Under special permission of Hirohito, the president of the Privy council, Hiranuma Kiichirō, was also a member of the imperial conference. For him, the preservation of the kokutai implied not only the Imperial institution but also the Emperor's reign.

Japan had an example of unconditional surrender in the German Instrument of Surrender. On 26 July, Truman and other Allied leaders—except the Soviet Union—issued the Potsdam Declaration outlining terms of surrender for Japan. The declaration stated, "The alternative for Japan is prompt and utter destruction." It was not accepted, though there is debate on Japan's intentions. The Emperor, who was waiting for a Soviet reply to Japanese peace feelers, made no move to change the government position. In the PBS documentary "Victory in the Pacific" (2005), broadcast in the American Experience series, historian Donald Miller argues, in the days after the declaration, the Emperor seemed more concerned with moving the Imperial Regalia of Japan to a secure location than with "the destruction of his country". This comment is based on declarations made by the Emperor to Kōichi Kido on 25 and 31 July 1945, when he ordered the Lord Keeper of the Privy Seal of Japan to protect "at all cost" the Imperial Regalia.

It has sometimes been argued Japan would have surrendered if simply guaranteed the Emperor would be allowed to continue as formal head of state. However, Japanese diplomatic messages regarding a possible Soviet mediation—intercepted through Magic, and made available to Allied leaders—have been interpreted by some historians to mean, "the dominant militarists insisted on preservation of the old militaristic order in Japan, the one in which they ruled." On 18 and 20 July 1945, Ambassador Sato cabled to Foreign Minister Togo, strongly advocating that Japan accept an unconditional surrender provided that the U.S. preserved the imperial house (keeping the emperor). On 21 July, in response, Togo rejected the advice, saying that Japan would not accept an unconditional surrender under any circumstance. Togo then said that, "Although it is apparent that there will be more casualties on both sides in case the war is prolonged, we will stand as united against the enemy if the enemy forcibly demands our unconditional surrender." They also faced potential death sentences in trials for Japanese war crimes if they surrendered. This was also what occurred in the International Military Tribunal for the Far East and other tribunals. Further diplomatic cables suggest the Japanese ambassador in Moscow thought the Foreign Ministry in Tokyo had an unrealistic view of events.

History professor Robert James Maddox wrote:

Another myth that has attained wide attention is that at least several of Truman's top military advisers later informed him that using atomic bombs against Japan would be militarily unnecessary or immoral, or both. There is no persuasive evidence that any of them did so. None of the Joint Chiefs ever made such a claim, although one inventive author has tried to make it appear that Leahy did by braiding together several unrelated passages from the admiral's memoirs. Actually, two days after Hiroshima, Truman told aides that Leahy had 'said up to the last that it wouldn't go off.'

Neither MacArthur nor Nimitz ever communicated to Truman any change of mind about the need for invasion or expressed reservations about using the bombs. When first informed about their imminent use only days before Hiroshima, MacArthur responded with a lecture on the future of atomic warfare and even after Hiroshima strongly recommended that the invasion go forward. Nimitz, from whose jurisdiction the atomic strikes would be launched, was notified in early 1945. 'This sounds fine,' he told the courier, 'but this is only February. Can't we get one sooner?'

The best that can be said about Eisenhower's memory is that it had become flawed by the passage of time.

Notes made by one of Stimson's aides indicate that there was a discussion of atomic bombs, but there is no mention of any protest on Eisenhower's part.

Maddox also wrote, "Even after both bombs had fallen and Russia entered the war, Japanese militants insisted on such lenient peace terms that moderates knew there was no sense even transmitting them to the United States. Hirohito had to intervene personally on two occasions during the next few days to induce hardliners to abandon their conditions." "That they would have conceded defeat months earlier, before such calamities struck, is far-fetched to say the least."

Even after the triple shock of the Soviet intervention and two atomic bombs, the Japanese cabinet was still deadlocked, incapable of deciding upon a course of action due to the power of the Army and Navy factions in cabinet who were unwilling to even consider surrender. Following the personal intervention of the emperor to break the deadlock in favour of surrender, there were no fewer than three separate coup attempts by senior Japanese officers to try to prevent the surrender and take the Emperor into 'protective custody'. Once these coup attempts had failed, senior leaders of the air force and Navy ordered bombing and kamikaze raids on the U.S. fleet (in which some Japanese generals personally participated) to try to derail any possibility of peace. It is clear from these accounts that while many in the civilian government knew the war could not be won, the power of the military in the Japanese government kept surrender from even being considered as a real option prior to the two atomic bombs.

Another argument is that it was the Soviet declaration of war in the days between the bombings that caused the surrender. After the war, Admiral Soemu Toyoda said, "I believe the Russian participation in the war against Japan rather than the atom bombs did more to hasten the surrender." Prime Minister Suzuki also declared that the entry of the USSR into the war made "the continuance of the war impossible". Upon hearing news of the event from Foreign Minister Togo, Suzuki immediately said, "Let us end the war", and agreed to finally convene an emergency meeting of the Supreme Council with that aim. The official British history, The War Against Japan, also writes the Soviet declaration of war "brought home to all members of the Supreme Council the realization that the last hope of a negotiated peace had gone and there was no alternative but to accept the Allied terms sooner or later". However, others have argued the Soviet declaration of war would not have come as a large shock to the Japanese leadership unlike the atomic bombings as they were aware of a Soviet military buildup in the Far East for months anticipating an eventual attack at a later date.

The "one condition" faction, led by Togo, seized on the bombing as decisive justification of surrender. Kōichi Kido, one of Emperor Hirohito's closest advisers, stated, "We of the peace party were assisted by the atomic bomb in our endeavor to end the war." Kido also stated, "I believe that with the atomic bomb alone we could have brought the war to an end. But the Soviet entry into the war made it that much easier." Hisatsune Sakomizu, the chief Cabinet secretary in 1945, called the bombing "a golden opportunity given by heaven for Japan to end the war". He further stated, "I am sure we could have ended the war in a similar way if the Russian declaration of the war had not taken place at all."

Moreover, the enemy has begun to employ a new and most cruel bomb, the power of which to do damage is, indeed, incalculable, taking the toll of many innocent lives. Should We continue to fight, not only would it result in an ultimate collapse and obliteration of the Japanese nation, but also it would lead to the total extinction of human civilization. Such being the case, how are We to save the millions of Our subjects, or to atone Ourselves before the hallowed spirits of Our Imperial Ancestors? This is the reason why We have ordered the acceptance of the provisions of the Joint Declaration of the Powers.

— Extract from Emperor Hirohito's Gyokuon-hōsō surrender speech, August 15, 1945

In a private letter to his son dated Sept. 9, 1945, the Emperor also wrote:

Allow me to say something about the reasons for the defeat. Our people believed in the imperial state too much, and despised Britain and the United States. Our military men placed too much significance on spirit, and were oblivious to science. I made efforts to swallow tears and to protect the species of the Japanese nation.

=== Japanese nuclear weapon program ===
During the war, and 1945 in particular, due to state secrecy, very little was known outside Japan about the slow progress of the Japanese nuclear weapon program. The US knew that Japan had requested materials from their German allies, and 560 kg (1,230 lb) of unprocessed uranium oxide was dispatched to Japan in April 1945 aboard the submarine U-234, which however surrendered to US forces in the Atlantic following Germany's surrender. The uranium oxide was reportedly labeled as "U-235", which may have been a mislabeling of the submarine's name; its exact characteristics remain unknown. Some sources believe that it was not weapons-grade material and was intended for use as a catalyst in the production of synthetic methanol to be used for aviation fuel.

If post-war analysis had found that Japanese nuclear weapons development was near completion, this discovery might have served in a revisionist sense to justify the atomic attack on Japan. However, it is known that the poorly coordinated Japanese project was considerably behind the US developments in 1945, and also behind the unsuccessful German nuclear program during World War II.

A review in 1986 of the fringe hypothesis that Japan had already created a nuclear weapon, by Department of Energy employee Roger M. Anders, appeared in the journal Military Affairs:

Journalist Wilcox's book describes the Japanese wartime atomic energy projects. This is laudable, in that it illuminates a little-known episode; nevertheless, the work is marred by Wilcox's seeming eagerness to show that Japan created an atomic bomb. Tales of Japanese atomic explosions, one a fictional attack on Los Angeles, the other an unsubstantiated account of a post-Hiroshima test, begin the book. (Wilcox accepts the test story because the author [Snell], "was a distinguished journalist"). The tales, combined with Wilcox's failure to discuss the difficulty of translating scientific theory into a workable bomb, obscure the actual story of the Japanese effort: uncoordinated laboratory-scale projects which took paths least likely to produce a bomb.

=== Soviet interference ===
Post-World War II Japan, under the circumstance that the United States did not drop the two atomic weapons on Japan, could have seen a state of existence comparable to that of Korea and Germany, in the years of Soviet occupation on one side and Western occupation on the other. This would not be completely unthinkable due to the proposed Soviet invasion of Hokkaido, a planned invasion of the northernmost island of the Japanese home islands, which was supposed to start two months before the American invasion of Kyushu (the southernmost island). Had the Soviets actually commenced the aforementioned invasion and, for that matter, succeeded, they would gain a foothold in an island of immense strategic relevance. In that respect, the United States' (as well as their allies') plan, known as Operation Downfall, may have become a gambit in a situation that could be dangerous or perhaps deadly for the interests of the United States, its allies, or even the world.

While valid projections or viable predictions for such a situation are scarce, a detailed analysis of similar, empirically observed situations provides legitimate reasons to consider Soviet interference a valid concern. In many cases under the criteria that Soviet influence or occupation is observed on part of the country or region and Western influence seen on another, conflict erupted. A few examples of this would include: the Korean War, where a Soviet-backed North Korea invaded the pro-Western South Korea, and ultimately resulted in a multinational war with a UN coalition, primarily consisting of American forces, versus a joint North Korean-Chinese Communist Party force; the Berlin Blockade, where the Soviet Union sought to starve the pro-Western West Berlin into submission, but ultimately failed due to the Berlin Airlift; the Vietnam War, a Cold War proxy-conflict between the U.S. and Soviet Union, which pitted the pro-Communist North Vietnam against the American-backed South Vietnam; and other similar cases. In fact, the vacuum left after Japan's surrender in contested areas of China became a shady duel between communism and democracy, as Eugene Sledge writes in the book The Cold War: A Military History: "In northern China at this time were many different armed groups: Japanese, Japanese-trained and -equipped Chinese puppet-government soldiers, Chinese Communists, Chinese Nationalists, Chinese bandits, and U.S. Marines... In Lang Fang and many other areas, even the surrendered Japanese were allowed to retain their arms, under U.S. supervision, in order to help fight the Communists".

== Opposition ==
=== Militarily unnecessary ===
Assistant Secretary Bard was convinced that a standard bombardment and naval blockade would be enough to force Japan into surrendering. Even more, he had seen signs for weeks that the Japanese were actually already looking for a way out of the war. His idea was for the United States to tell the Japanese about the bomb, the impending Soviet entry into the war, and the fair treatment that citizens and the Emperor would receive at the coming Big Three conference. Before the bombing occurred, Bard pleaded with Truman to neither drop the bombs (at least not without warning the population first) nor to invade the entire country, proposing to stop the bloodshed.

The 1946 United States Strategic Bombing Survey in Japan, whose members included Paul Nitze, concluded the atomic bombs had been unnecessary to win the war. They said:

There is little point in attempting precisely to impute Japan's unconditional surrender to any one of the numerous causes which jointly and cumulatively were responsible for Japan's disaster. The time lapse between military impotence and political acceptance of the inevitable might have been shorter had the political structure of Japan permitted a more rapid and decisive determination of national policies. Nevertheless, it seems clear that, even without the atomic bombing attacks, air supremacy over Japan could have exerted sufficient pressure to bring about unconditional surrender and obviate the need for invasion.

Based on a detailed investigation of all the facts, and supported by the testimony of the surviving Japanese leaders involved, it is the Survey's opinion that certainly prior to 31 December 1945, and in all probability prior to 1 November 1945, Japan would have surrendered even if the atomic bombs had not been dropped, even if Russia had not entered the war, and even if no invasion had been planned or contemplated.

This conclusion assumed conventional firebombing would have continued, with ever-increasing numbers of B-29s, and a greater level of destruction to Japan's cities and population. One of Nitze's most influential sources was Prince Fumimaro Konoe, who responded to a question asking whether Japan would have surrendered if the atomic bombs had not been dropped by saying resistance would have continued through November or December 1945.

Historians such as Gentile, Hasegawa, and Newman have criticized Nitze for drawing a conclusion they say went far beyond what the available evidence warranted, in order to promote the reputation of the Air Force at the expense of the Army and Navy.

Dwight D. Eisenhower wrote in his memoir The White House Years:

In 1945 Secretary of War Stimson, visiting my headquarters in Germany, informed me that our government was preparing to drop an atomic bomb on Japan. I was one of those who felt that there were a number of cogent reasons to question the wisdom of such an act. During his recitation of the relevant facts, I had been conscious of a feeling of depression and so I voiced to him my grave misgivings, first on the basis of my belief that Japan was already defeated and that dropping the bomb was completely unnecessary, and secondly, because I thought that our country should avoid shocking world opinion by the use of a weapon whose employment was, I thought, no longer mandatory as a measure to save American lives.

Other U.S. military officers who disagreed with the necessity of the bombings include General of the Army Douglas MacArthur, Fleet Admiral William D. Leahy (the Chief of Staff to the President), Brigadier General Carter Clarke (the military intelligence officer who prepared intercepted Japanese cables for U.S. officials), Fleet Admiral Chester W. Nimitz (Commander in Chief of the Pacific Fleet), Fleet Admiral William Halsey Jr. (Commander of the US Third Fleet), and even the man in charge of all strategic air operations against the Japanese home islands, then-Major General Curtis LeMay:

The Japanese had, in fact, already sued for peace. The atomic bomb played no decisive part, from a purely military point of view, in the defeat of Japan.

— Fleet Admiral Chester W. Nimitz, Commander in Chief of the U.S. Pacific Fleet,

The use of [the atomic bombs] at Hiroshima and Nagasaki was of no material assistance in our war against Japan. The Japanese were already defeated and ready to surrender because of the effective sea blockade and the successful bombing with conventional weapons ... The lethal possibilities of atomic warfare in the future are frightening. My own feeling was that in being the first to use it, we had adopted an ethical standard common to the barbarians of the Dark Ages. I was not taught to make war in that fashion, and wars cannot be won by destroying women and children.

— Fleet Admiral William D. Leahy, Chief of Staff to President Truman, 1950,

The atomic bomb had nothing to do with the end of the war at all.

— Major General Curtis LeMay, XXI Bomber Command, September 1945,

The first atomic bomb was an unnecessary experiment ... It was a mistake to ever drop it ... [the scientists] had this toy and they wanted to try it out, so they dropped it.

— Fleet Admiral William Halsey Jr., 1946,

Stephen Peter Rosen of Harvard believes that a submarine blockade would have been sufficient to force Japan to surrender.

Historian Tsuyoshi Hasegawa wrote the atomic bombings themselves were not the principal reason for Japan's capitulation. Instead, he contends, it was the Soviet entry in the war on 8 August, allowed by the Potsdam Declaration signed by the other Allies. The fact the Soviet Union did not sign this declaration gave Japan reason to believe the Soviets could be kept out of the war. As late as 25 July, the day before the declaration was issued, Japan had asked for a diplomatic envoy led by Konoe to come to Moscow hoping to mediate peace in the Pacific. Konoe was supposed to bring a letter from the Emperor stating:

His Majesty the Emperor, mindful of the fact that the present war daily brings greater evil and sacrifice of the peoples of all the belligerent powers, desires from his heart that it may be quickly terminated. But as long as England and the United States insist upon unconditional surrender the Japanese Empire has no alternative to fight on with all its strength for the honour and existence of the Motherland ... It is the Emperor's private intention to send Prince Konoe to Moscow as a Special Envoy ...

Hasegawa's view is, when the Soviet Union declared war on 8 August, it crushed all hope in Japan's leading circles that the Soviets could be kept out of the war and also that reinforcements from Asia to the Japanese islands would be possible for the expected invasion. Hasegawa wrote:

On the basis of the available evidence, however, it is clear that the two atomic bombs ... alone were not decisive in inducing Japan to surrender. Despite their destructive power, the atomic bombs were not sufficient to change the direction of Japanese diplomacy. The Soviet invasion was. Without the Soviet entry in the war, the Japanese would have continued to fight until numerous atomic bombs, a successful allied invasion of the home islands, or continued aerial bombardments, combined with a naval blockade, rendered them incapable of doing so.

Ward Wilson wrote that "after Nagasaki was bombed only four major cities remained which could readily have been hit with atomic weapons", and that the Japanese Supreme Council did not bother to convene after the atomic bombings because they were barely more destructive than previous bombings. He wrote that instead, the Soviet declaration of war and invasion of Manchuria and South Sakhalin removed Japan's last diplomatic and military options for negotiating a conditional surrender, and this is what prompted Japan's surrender. He wrote that attributing Japan's surrender to a "miracle weapon", instead of the start of the Soviet invasion, saved face for Japan and enhanced the United States' world standing.

Prime Minister Suzuki said in August 1945 that Japan surrendered as quickly as possible to the United States because Japan expected the Soviet Union to invade and hold Hokkaido, an action which would "destroy the foundation of Japan".

=== Bombings as war crimes ===
Nowhere is this troubled sense of responsibility more acute, and surely nowhere has it been more prolix, than among those who participated in the development of atomic energy for military purposes. ... In some sort of crude sense which no vulgarity, no humor, no over-statement can quite extinguish, the physicists have known sin; and this is a knowledge which they cannot lose.

— Robert Oppenheimer
1947 Arthur D. Little Memorial Lecture

A number of notable individuals and organizations have criticized the bombings, many of them characterizing them as war crimes, crimes against humanity, and/or state terrorism. Early critics of the bombings were Albert Einstein, Eugene Wigner and Leó Szilárd, who had together spurred the first bomb research in 1939 with a jointly written letter to President Roosevelt.

Szilárd, who had gone on to play a major role in the Manhattan Project, argued:

Let me say only this much to the moral issue involved: Suppose Germany had developed two bombs before we had any bombs. And suppose Germany had dropped one bomb, say, on Rochester and the other on Buffalo, and then having run out of bombs she would have lost the war. Can anyone doubt that we would then have defined the dropping of atomic bombs on cities as a war crime, and that we would have sentenced the Germans who were guilty of this crime to death at Nuremberg and hanged them?

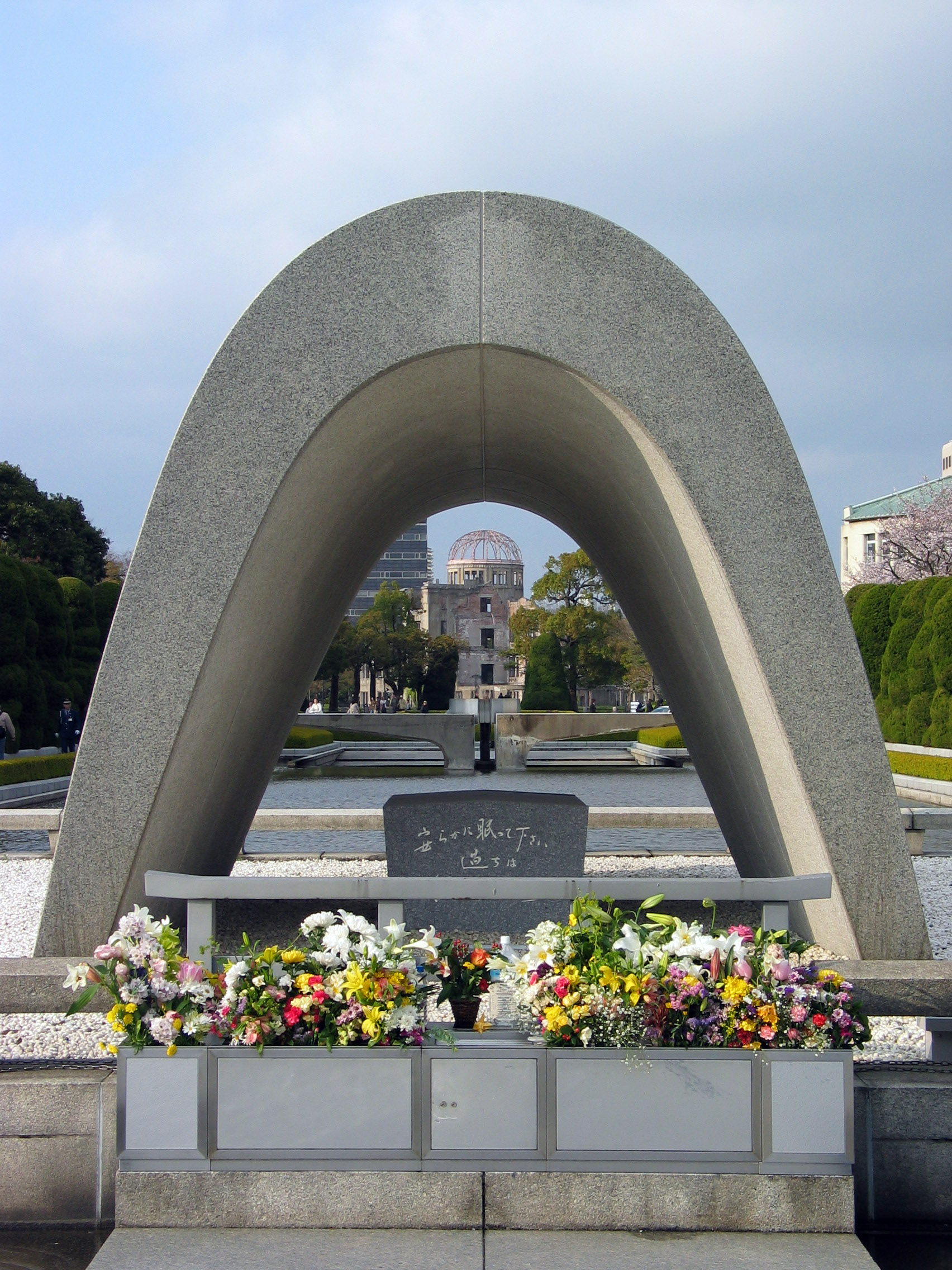
The cenotaph at the Hiroshima Peace Park is inscribed with the sentence: "Let all the souls here rest in peace; this mistake shall not be repeated." Although the sentence may seem ambiguous, it has been clarified that its intended agent is all of humanity, and the mistake referred to is war in general.

A number of scientists who worked on the bomb were against its use. Led by Dr. James Franck, seven scientists submitted a report to the Interim Committee (which advised the President) in May 1945, saying:

If the United States were to be the first to release this new means of indiscriminate destruction upon mankind, she would sacrifice public support throughout the world, precipitate the race for armaments, and prejudice the possibility of reaching an international agreement on the future control of such weapons.

Mark Selden writes, "Perhaps the most trenchant contemporary critique of the American moral position on the bomb and the scales of justice in the war was voiced by the Indian jurist Radhabinod Pal, a dissenting voice at the Tokyo War Crimes Tribunal, who balked at accepting the uniqueness of Japanese war crimes. Recalling Kaiser Wilhelm II's account of his duty to bring World War I to a swift end—"everything must be put to fire and sword; men, women and children and old men must be slaughtered and not a tree or house be left standing". Pal observed:

This policy of indiscriminate murder to shorten the war was considered to be a crime. In the Pacific war under our consideration, if there was anything approaching what is indicated in the above letter of the German Emperor, it is the decision coming from the Allied powers to use the bomb. Future generations will judge this dire decision ... If any indiscriminate destruction of civilian life and property is still illegal in warfare, then, in the Pacific War, this decision to use the atom bomb is the only near approach to the directives of the German Emperor during the first World War and of the Nazi leaders during the second World War.

Selden mentions another critique of the nuclear bombing, which he says the U.S. government effectively suppressed for twenty-five years, as worth mention. On 11 August 1945, the Japanese government filed an official protest over the atomic bombing to the U.S. State Department through the Swiss Legation in Tokyo, observing:

Combatant and noncombatant men and women, old and young, are massacred without discrimination by the atmospheric pressure of the explosion, as well as by the radiating heat which result therefrom. Consequently there is involved a bomb having the most cruel effects humanity has ever known ... The bombs in question, used by the Americans, by their cruelty and by their terrorizing effects, surpass by far gas or any other arm, the use of which is prohibited. Japanese protests against U.S. desecration of international principles of war paired the use of the atomic bomb with the earlier firebombing, which massacred old people, women and children, destroying and burning down Shinto and Buddhist temples, schools, hospitals, living quarters, etc ... They now use this new bomb, having an uncontrollable and cruel effect much greater than any other arms or projectiles ever used to date. This constitutes a new crime against humanity and civilization.

Selden concludes, "the Japanese protest correctly pointed to U.S. violations of internationally accepted principles of war with respect to the wholesale destruction of populations".

In 1963, the bombings were the subject of a judicial review in Ryuichi Shimoda et al. v. The State in Japan. On the 22nd anniversary of the attack on Pearl Harbor, the District Court of Tokyo ruled the use of nuclear weapons was not illegal in war, but issued an opinion in its obiter dictum that the act of dropping any bombs including atomic bombs on cities was at the time governed by the Hague Regulations on Land Warfare of 1907 and the Hague Draft Rules of Air Warfare of 1922–1923 and was therefore illegal.

In the documentary The Fog of War, former U.S. Secretary of Defense Robert McNamara recalls General Curtis LeMay, who relayed the Presidential order to drop nuclear bombs on Japan, said:

"If we'd lost the war, we'd all have been prosecuted as war criminals." And I think he's right. He, and I'd say I, were behaving as war criminals. LeMay recognized that what he was doing would be thought immoral if his side had lost. But what makes it immoral if you lose and not immoral if you win?

As the first combat use of nuclear weapons, the bombings of Hiroshima and Nagasaki represent to some the crossing of a crucial barrier. Peter Kuznick, director of the Nuclear Studies Institute at American University, wrote of President Truman: "He knew he was beginning the process of annihilation of the species." Kuznick said the atomic bombing of Japan "was not just a war crime; it was a crime against humanity".

Takashi Hiraoka, mayor of Hiroshima, upholding nuclear disarmament, said in a hearing to The Hague International Court of Justice (ICJ): "It is clear that the use of nuclear weapons, which cause indiscriminate mass murder that leaves [effects on] survivors for decades, is a violation of international law". Iccho Itoh, the mayor of Nagasaki, declared in the same hearing:

It is said that the descendants of the atomic bomb survivors will have to be monitored for several generations to clarify the genetic impact, which means that the descendants will live in anxiety for [decades] to come ... with their colossal power and capacity for slaughter and destruction, nuclear weapons make no distinction between combatants and non-combatants or between military installations and civilian communities ... The use of nuclear weapons ... therefore is a manifest infraction of international law.

Although bombings do not meet the definition of genocide, some consider the definition too strict, and argue the bombings do constitute genocide. For example, University of Chicago historian Bruce Cumings states there is a consensus among historians to Martin Sherwin's statement, "[T]he Nagasaki bomb was gratuitous at best and genocidal at worst".

The scholar R. J. Rummel instead extends the definition of genocide to what he calls democide, and includes the major part of deaths from the atom bombings in these. His definition of democide includes not only genocide, but also an excessive killing of civilians in war, to the extent this is against the agreed rules for warfare; he argues the bombings of Hiroshima and Nagasaki were war crimes, and thus democide. Rummel quotes among others an official protest from the US government in 1938 to Japan, for its bombing of Chinese cities: "The bombing of non-combatant populations violated international and humanitarian laws." He also considers excess deaths of civilians in conflagrations caused by conventional means, such as in Tokyo, as acts of democide.

In 1967, Noam Chomsky described the atomic bombings as "among the most unspeakable crimes in history". Chomsky pointed to the complicity of the American people in the bombings, referring to the bitter experiences they had undergone prior to the event as the cause for their acceptance of its legitimacy.

In 2007, a group of intellectuals in Hiroshima established an unofficial body called International Peoples' Tribunal on the Dropping of Atomic Bombs on Hiroshima and Nagasaki. On 16 July 2007, it delivered its verdict, stating:

The Tribunal finds that the nature of damage caused by the atomic bombs can be described as indiscriminate extermination of all life forms or inflicting unnecessary pain to the survivors.

About the legality and the morality of the action, the unofficial tribunal found:

The ... use of nuclear weapons in Hiroshima and Nagasaki was illegal in the light of the principles and rules of International Humanitarian Law applicable in armed conflicts, since the bombing of both cities, made civilians the object of attack, using nuclear weapons that were incapable of distinguishing between civilians and military targets and consequently, caused unnecessary suffering to the civilian survivors.

=== State terrorism ===
Historical accounts indicate the decision to use the atomic bombs was made in order to provoke a surrender of Japan by use of an awe-inspiring power. These observations have caused Michael Walzer to state the incident was an act of "war terrorism: the effort to kill civilians in such large numbers that their government is forced to surrender. Hiroshima seems to me the classic case." This type of claim eventually prompted historian Robert P. Newman, a supporter of the bombings, to say "there can be justified terror, as there can be just wars".

Certain scholars and historians have characterized the atomic bombings of Japan as a form of "state terrorism". This interpretation is based on a definition of terrorism as "the targeting of innocents to achieve a political goal". As Frances V. Harbour points out, the meeting of the Target Committee in Los Alamos on 10 and 11 May 1945 suggested targeting the large population centers of Kyoto or Hiroshima for a "psychological effect" and to make "the initial use sufficiently spectacular for the importance of the weapon to be internationally recognized". As such, Professor Harbour suggests the goal was to create terror for political ends both in and beyond Japan. However, Burleigh Taylor Wilkins believes it stretches the meaning of "terrorism" to include wartime acts.

Historian Howard Zinn wrote that the bombings were terrorism. Zinn cites the sociologist Kai Erikson who said that the bombings could not be called "combat" because they targeted civilians. Just War theorist Michael Walzer said that while taking the lives of civilians can be justified under conditions of 'supreme emergency', the war situation at that time did not constitute such an emergency.

Tony Coady, Frances V. Harbour, and Jamal Nassar also view the targeting of civilians during the bombings as a form of terrorism. Nassar classifies the atomic bombings as terrorism in the same vein as the firebombing of Tokyo, the firebombing of Dresden, and the Holocaust.

Richard A. Falk, professor emeritus of International Law and Practice at Princeton University has written in detail about Hiroshima and Nagasaki as instances of state terrorism. He said that "the explicit function of the attacks was to terrorize the population through mass slaughter and to confront its leaders with the prospect of national annihilation".

Author Steven Poole said that the "people killed by terrorism" are not the targets of the intended terror effect. He said that the atomic bombings were "designed as an awful demonstration" aimed at Stalin and the government of Japan.

Alexander Werth, historian and BBC Eastern Front war correspondent, suggests that the nuclear bombing of Japan mainly served to demonstrate the new weapon in the most shocking way, virtually at the Soviet Union's doorstep, in order to prepare the political post-war field.

=== Fundamentally immoral ===
The Vatican newspaper L'Osservatore Romano expressed regret in August 1945 that the bomb's inventors did not destroy the weapon for the benefit of humanity. Rev. Cuthbert Thicknesse, the Dean of St Albans, prohibited using St Albans Abbey for a thanksgiving service for the war's end, calling the use of atomic weapons "an act of wholesale, indiscriminate massacre". A 1946 report by the Federal Council of Churches entitled Atomic Warfare and the Christian Faith includes the following passage:

As American Christians, we are deeply penitent for the irresponsible use already made of the atomic bomb. We are agreed that, whatever be one's judgment of the war in principle, the surprise bombings of Hiroshima and Nagasaki are morally indefensible.

The bombers' chaplain, Father George Benedict Zabelka, would later renounce the bombings after visiting Nagasaki with two fellow chaplains.

In 2020, Pope Francis, during his visit to Hiroshima, stated the following:

The use of atomic energy for purposes of war is immoral, just as the possessing of nuclear weapons is immoral.

It has never been clearer that, for peace to flourish, all people need to lay down the weapons of war, and especially the most powerful and destructive of weapons: nuclear arms that can cripple and destroy whole cities, whole countries.

Terumi Tanaka, from the survivors' organization of the atomic bomb Nihon Hidankyo, stated the following:

Such inhumane and immoral acts must never be allowed. It is unacceptable to use nuclear weapons in the name of "national security." No state is safe if a nuclear weapon is used, even to protect the survival of a state. Nuclear deterrence, which allows the existence of nuclear weapons based on the possible use of them, goes completely against humanity. The experience of the Hibakusha should be the starting point when discussing the humanitarian impact of nuclear weapons.

Hidankyo received the Nobel Peace Prize in 2024, and Tanaka served as a representative during the ceremony.

==== Continuation of previous behavior ====
American historian Gabriel Kolko wrote that certain discussion regarding the moral dimension of the attacks is misguided given that the fundamental moral decision had already been made:

During November 1944 American B-29s began their first incendiary bomb raids on Tokyo, and on 9 March 1945, wave upon wave dropped masses of small incendiaries containing an early version of napalm on the city's population—for they directed this assault against civilians. Soon small fires spread, connected, grew into a vast firestorm that sucked the oxygen out of the lower atmosphere. The bomb raid was a 'success' for the Americans; they killed 125,000 Japanese in one attack. The Allies bombed Hamburg and Dresden in the same manner, and Nagoya, Osaka, Kobe, and Tokyo again on May 24. The basic moral decision that the Americans had to make during the war was whether or not they would violate international law by indiscriminately attacking and destroying civilians, and they resolved that dilemma within the context of conventional weapons. Neither fanfare nor hesitation accompanied their choice, and in fact the atomic bomb used against Hiroshima was less lethal than massive fire bombing. The war had so brutalized the American leaders that burning vast numbers of civilians no longer posed a real predicament by the spring of 1945. Given the anticipated power of the atomic bomb, which was far less than that of fire bombing, no one expected small quantities of it to end the war. Only its technique was novel—nothing more. By June 1945 the mass destruction of civilians via strategic bombing did impress Stimson as something of a moral problem, but the thought no sooner arose than he forgot it, and in no appreciable manner did it shape American use of conventional or atomic bombs. "I did not want to have the United States get the reputation of outdoing Hitler in atrocities", he noted telling the President on June 6. There was another difficulty posed by mass conventional bombing, and that was its very success, a success that made the two modes of human destruction qualitatively identical in fact and in the minds of the American military. "I was a little fearful", Stimson told Truman, "that before we could get ready the Air Force might have Japan so thoroughly bombed out that the new weapon would not have a fair background to show its strength." To this the President "laughed and said he understood".

=== Nagasaki bombing unnecessary ===
The atomic bombing of Nagasaki occurred only three days after the bombing of Hiroshima, when the devastation at Hiroshima had yet to be fully comprehended by the Japanese. The lack of time between the bombings has led some historians to state that the second bombing was "certainly unnecessary", "gratuitous at best and genocidal at worst", and not jus in bello. In response to the claim that the atomic bombing of Nagasaki was unnecessary, Maddox wrote:

American officials believed more than one bomb would be necessary because they assumed Japanese hard-liners would minimize the first explosion or attempt to explain it away as some sort of natural catastrophe, which is precisely what they did. In the three days between the bombings, the Japanese minister of war, for instance, refused even to admit that the Hiroshima bomb was atomic. A few hours after Nagasaki, he told the cabinet that "the Americans appeared to have one hundred atomic bombs ... they could drop three per day. The next target might well be Tokyo."

Jerome Hagen indicates that war minister Anami's revised briefing was partly based on interrogating captured American pilot Marcus McDilda. Under torture, McDilda reported that the Americans had 100 atomic bombs and that Tokyo and Kyoto would be the next atomic bomb targets. Both were lies; McDilda was not involved in or briefed on the Manhattan Project and simply told the Japanese what he thought they wanted to hear.

One day before the bombing of Nagasaki, the emperor notified foreign minister Shigenori Tōgō of his desire to "insure a prompt ending of hostilities". Tōgō wrote in his memoir that the emperor "warned [him] that since we could no longer continue the struggle, now that a weapon of this devastating power was used against us, we should not let slip the opportunity [to end the war] by engaging in attempts to gain more favorable conditions". The emperor then requested Tōgō to communicate his wishes to the prime minister.

=== Dehumanization ===
Historian James J. Weingartner sees a connection between the American mutilation of Japanese war dead and the bombings. According to Weingartner, both were partially the result of a dehumanization of the enemy: "[T]he widespread image of the Japanese as sub-human constituted an emotional context which provided another justification for decisions which resulted in the death of hundreds of thousands." On the second day after the bombing of Nagasaki, President Truman had stated: "The only language they seem to understand is the one we have been using to bombard them. When you have to deal with a beast you have to treat him like a beast. It is most regrettable but nevertheless true".

=== Intimidate the Soviets ===
In 2003, Nelson Mandela, who opposed apartheid in South Africa, said the following about the Hiroshima and Nagasaki bombings:

57 years ago, when Japan was retreating on all fronts, they (U.S.) decided to drop the atom bomb in Hiroshima and Nagasaki. Killed a lot of innocent people, who are still suffering from the effects of those bomb. Those bomb were not aimed against the Japanese. They were aimed against the Soviet Union. To say, look, this is the power that we have. If you dare oppose what we do, this is what is going to happen to you. Because they are so arrogant they decided to kill innocent people in Japan who are still suffering from that.

This statement was made during discussions about the Iraq War. Mandela also stated that the U.S. has committed unspeakable atrocities and is a country that does not care about human beings.

Historian Kai Bird argues that the U.S. had intercepted Japanese diplomatic cables in July 1945 showing that Japan was seeking peace, with the primary condition being the preservation of the emperor system. Despite this, the U.S. proceeded with the bombings. Bird also suggests that the bomb was used partly to send a strategic message to the Soviet Union in the emerging postwar context.

== International law ==
At the time of the atomic bombings, there was no international treaty or instrument protecting a civilian population specifically from attack by aircraft. Many critics of the atomic bombings point to the Hague Conventions of 1899 and 1907 as setting rules in place regarding the attack of civilian populations. The Hague Conventions contained no specific air warfare provisions but it prohibited the targeting of undefended civilians by naval artillery, field artillery, or siege engines, all of which were classified as "bombardment". However, the Conventions allowed the targeting of military establishments in cities, including military depots, industrial plants, and workshops which could be used for war. This set of rules was not followed during World War I which saw bombs dropped indiscriminately on cities by Zeppelins and multi-engine bombers. Afterward, another series of meetings were held at The Hague in 1922–23, but no binding agreement was reached regarding air warfare. During the 1930s and 1940s, the aerial bombing of cities was resumed, notably by the German Condor Legion against the cities of Guernica and Durango in Spain in 1937 during the Spanish Civil War. This led to an escalation of various cities bombed, including Chongqing, Warsaw, Rotterdam, London, Coventry, Hamburg, Dresden, and Tokyo. All of the major belligerents in World War II dropped bombs on civilians in cities.

Modern debate over the applicability of the Hague Conventions to the atomic bombings of Hiroshima and Nagasaki revolves around whether the Conventions can be assumed to cover modes of warfare that were at the time unknown; whether rules for artillery bombardment can be applied to rules for aerial bombing. As well, the debate hinges on to what degree the Hague Conventions was being followed by the warring countries.

If the Hague Conventions is admitted as applicable, the critical question becomes whether the bombed cities met the definition of "undefended". Some observers consider Hiroshima and Nagasaki undefended, some say that both cities were legitimate military targets, and others say that Hiroshima could be considered a legitimate military target while Nagasaki was comparatively undefended. Hiroshima has been argued as not a legitimate target because the major industrial plants were just outside the target area. It has also been argued as a legitimate target because Hiroshima was the headquarters of the regional Second General Army and Fifth Division with 40,000 combatants stationed in the city. Both cities were protected by anti-aircraft guns, which is an argument against the definition of "undefended".

The Hague Conventions prohibited poison weapons. The radioactivity of the atomic bombings has been described as poisonous, especially in the form of nuclear fallout which kills more slowly. However, this view was rejected by the International Court of Justice in 1996, which stated that the primary and exclusive use of (air burst) nuclear weapons is not to poison or asphyxiate and thus is not prohibited by the Geneva Protocol.

The Hague Conventions also prohibited the employment of "arms, projectiles, or material calculated to cause unnecessary suffering". The Japanese government cited this prohibition on 10 August 1945 after submitting a letter of protest to the United States denouncing the use of atomic bombs. However, the prohibition only applied to weapons as lances with a barbed head, irregularly shaped bullets, projectiles filled with glass, the use of any substance on bullets that would tend unnecessarily to inflame a wound inflicted by them, along with grooving bullet tips or the creation of soft point bullets by filing off the ends of the hard coating on full metal jacketed bullets.

It however did not apply to the use of explosives contained in artillery projectiles, mines, aerial torpedoes, or hand grenades. In 1962 and in 1963, the Japanese government retracted its previous statement by saying that there was no international law prohibiting the use of atomic bombs.

The Hague Conventions stated that religious buildings, art and science centers, charities, hospitals, and historic monuments were to be spared as far as possible in a bombardment, unless they were being used for military purposes. Critics of the atomic bombings point to many of these kinds of structures which were destroyed in Hiroshima and Nagasaki. However, the Hague Conventions also stated that for the destruction of the enemy's property to be justified, it must be "imperatively demanded by the necessities of war". Because of the inaccuracy of heavy bombers in World War II, it was not practical to target military assets in cities without damage to civilian targets.

Even after the atomic bombs were dropped on Japan, no international treaty banning or condemning nuclear warfare has ever been ratified. The closest example is a resolution by the UN General Assembly which stated that nuclear warfare was not in keeping with the UN charter, passed in 1953 with a vote of 25 to 20, and 26 abstentions.

== Impact on surrender ==
Varying opinions exist on the question of what role the bombings played in Japan's surrender, and some regard the bombings as the deciding factor, but others see the bombs as a minor factor, and yet others assess their importance as unknowable.

The mainstream position in the United States from 1945 to the 1960s regarded the bombings as the decisive factor in ending the war, which has been termed by commentators as the "traditionalist" view or pejoratively as the "patriotic orthodoxy".

Some, on the other hand, see the Soviet invasion of Manchuria as primary or decisive. In the US, Robert Pape and Tsuyoshi Hasegawa have particularly advanced this view, which some have found convincing, but others have criticized it.

Robert Pape also argues:

Military vulnerability, not civilian vulnerability, accounts for Japan's decision to surrender. Japan's military position was so poor that its leaders would likely have surrendered before invasion, and at roughly the same time in August 1945, even if the United States had not employed strategic bombing or the atomic bomb. Rather than concern for the costs and risks to the population, or even Japan's overall military weakness vis-a-vis the United States, the decisive factor was Japanese leaders' recognition that their strategy for holding the most important territory at issue—the home islands—could not succeed.

In Japanese writing about the surrender, many accounts consider the Soviet entry into the war as the primary reason or as having equal importance with the atomic bombs, and others, such as the work of Sadao Asada, give primacy to the atomic bombings, particularly their impact on the emperor. The primacy of the Soviet entry as a reason for surrender is a longstanding view by some Japanese historians, and it has appeared in some Japanese junior high school textbooks.

The argument about the Soviet role in Japan's surrender has a connection with the argument about the Soviet role in America's decision to drop the bomb. Both arguments emphasize the importance of the Soviet Union. The former suggests that Japan surrendered to the US out of fear of the Soviet Union, and the latter emphasizes that the US dropped the bombs to intimidate the Soviet Union. Soviet accounts of the ending of the war emphasised the role of the Soviet Union. The Great Soviet Encyclopedia summarised events thus:

In August 1945 American military air forces dropped atomic bombs on the cities of Hiroshima (6 August) and of Nagasaki (9 August). These bombings were not caused by military necessity, and served primarily political aims. They inflicted enormous damage on the peaceable population.

Fulfilling the obligations entered into by agreement with its allies and aiming for a very speedy ending of the second world war, the Soviet government on 8 August 1945 declared that from 9 August 1945 the USSR would be in a state of war against [Japan], and associated itself with the 1945 Potsdam declaration... of the governments of the USA, Great Britain and China of 26 July 1945, which demanded the unconditional capitulation of [Japan] and foreshadowed the bases of its subsequent demilitarization and democratization. The attack by Soviet forces, smashing the Kwantung Army and liberating Manchuria, Northern Korea, Southern Sakhalin and the Kuril Islands, led to the rapid conclusion of the war in the Far East. On 2 September 1945 [Japan] signed the act of unconditional capitulation.

Though Japan had declared its surrender three days before the August 18 Soviet invasion of the Kuril Islands, the Soviet invasion of Manchuria was well underway, and so potentially creditable for playing a part in the initial declaration.

Still others have argued that war-weary Japan would likely have surrendered regardless because of a collapse of the economy; the lack of army, food, and industrial materials; threat of internal revolution; and the talk of surrender since earlier in the year. However, others find it unlikely and argue that Japan could likely have put up a spirited resistance.

The Japanese historian Sadao Asada argues that the ultimate decision to surrender was a personal decision by the emperor, who was influenced by the atomic bombings.

In his 2007 biography of Hirohito, Japanese historian Ikuhiko Hata wrote:

The author has made it a habit, when meeting with former members of the Imperial Army and Navy, to ask which had the greater impact at the time: the atomic bombs or the Soviet entry into the war? The responses run about 50-50, yet all agree that neither blow alone would have been sufficient; if they had not coincided, an end to the war in August 1945 would have been impossible.

== Atomic diplomacy ==
A further argument, discussed under the rubric of "atomic diplomacy" and advanced in a 1965 book of that name by Gar Alperovitz, is that the bombings had as primary purpose to intimidate the Soviet Union and were the opening shots of the Cold War. Along those lines, some argue that the United States hoped to drop the bombs and receive surrender from Japan before a Soviet entry into the Pacific War. However, the Soviet Union, the United States, and the United Kingdom came to an agreement at the Yalta Conference on when the Soviet Union should join the war against Japan and on how the territory of Japan was to be divided at the end of the war.

Others argue that such considerations played little or no role, the United States being instead concerned with the surrender of Japan, and in fact, the United States desired and appreciated the Soviet entry into the Pacific War, as it hastened the surrender of Japan. In his memoirs, Truman wrote: "There were many reasons for my going to Potsdam, but the most urgent, to my mind, was to get from Stalin a personal reaffirmation of Russia's entry into the war against Japan, a matter which our military chiefs were most anxious to clinch. This I was able to get from Stalin in the very first days of the conference."

Campbell Craig and Fredrik Logevall argue the two bombs were dropped for different reasons:

Truman's disinclination to delay the second bombing brings the Soviet factor back into consideration. What the destruction of Nagasaki accomplished was Japan's immediate surrender, and for Truman this swift capitulation was crucial in order to preempt a Soviet military move into Asia.... In short, the first bomb was dropped as soon as it was ready, and for the reason the administration expressed: to hasten the end of the Pacific War. But in the case of the second bomb, timing was everything. In an important sense, the destruction of Nagasaki—not the bombing itself but Truman's refusal to delay it—was America's first act of the Cold War.

== Public opinion ==
=== In the United States ===
The Pew Research Center conducted a 2015 survey showing that 56% of Americans supported the atomic bombings of Hiroshima and Nagasaki and 34% opposed. The study highlighted the impact of the respondents' generations, showing that support for the bombings was 70% among Americans 65 and older but only 47% for those between 18 and 29. Political leanings also impacted responses, according to the survey; support was measured at 74% for Republicans and 52% for Democrats. There are also differences in support and disapproval by ethnic groups. According to a CBS News survey, 49% of white Americans supported the atomic bombings, while only 24% of non-white Americans supported the bombings.

In a 2025 Pew Research Center survey conducted ahead of the 80th anniversary of the bombings, American views appeared more divided than ever: only 35% of respondents said the bombings were justified, while 31% said they were not justified, and 33% were unsure. The 2025 survey also revealed that older adults (65+) remained the most supportive age group (48%), while adults under 30 were more likely to say the bombings were unjustified (44%) than justified (27%).

American approval of the bombings has decreased substantially since 1945, when a Gallup poll showed 85% support while only 10% disapproved. Forty-five years later, in 1990, Gallup conducted another poll and found 53% support and 41% opposition. Another Gallup poll in 2005 echoed the findings of the 2015 Pew Research Center study by finding 57% support with 38% opposition. While the poll data from the Pew Research Center and Gallup show a stark drop in support for the bombings over the last half-century, Stanford political scientists have conducted research supporting their hypothesis that American public support for the use of nuclear force would be just as high today as in 1945 if a similar yet contemporary scenario presented itself.

In a 2017 study conducted by political scientists Scott D. Sagan and Benjamin A. Valentino, respondents were asked if they would support the use of atomic force in a hypothetical situation that kills 100,000 Iranian civilians versus an invasion that would result in the deaths of 20,000 American soldiers. The results showed that 59% of Americans would approve of a nuclear strike in such a situation. However, a 2010 Pew survey showed that 64% of Americans approved of Barack Obama's declaration that the US would abstain from the use of nuclear weapons against nations that did not have them.

=== In other countries ===
The atomic bombings are often discussed from the viewpoint that they reduced casualties among soldiers, but this reflects a U.S. perspective; in other countries, the issue is frequently debated from different viewpoints.

==== Japan ====
As the only country to have suffered atomic bombings, Japan maintains a strong social taboo against making jokes about nuclear weapons. In a 2015 survey, 79% of Japanese said the bombings could not be justified and 14% said they could.

A notable recent example occurred in 2023 with the release of the film Barbie, which premiered concurrently with Oppenheimer, a biographical drama about the creator of the atomic bomb. This led to the emergence of a viral "Barbenheimer" meme trend among American audiences, featuring images that combined Barbie's iconic style with imagery of mushroom clouds. The official U.S. Barbie movie account on social media responded positively to such memes, posting "It's going to be a summer to remember" (already deleted).

This reaction sparked backlash from the Japanese public and international media, with critics stating, for example, "In the US, people never make fun of the 9/11 attack or what Nazis did, but they can joke about the atomic bombings. I cannot express how saddened I am. This is regrettable." Others pointed out that the incident once again exposed the deeply self-serving standards of U.S.-led political correctness, which selectively enforces sensitivity while effectively tolerating racism against Asians. Amid growing criticism, Warner Bros., the distributor of the film, which had initially downplayed the issue, issued a formal apology.

Although it was the Japanese military that started the Pacific War, even those who were critical of the military did not necessarily support the atomic bombings. Shigeru Yoshida and Jiro Shirasu were both known for opposing the war and clashing with the military during the Pacific War. After World War II, they gained strong popularity among the Japanese public.

The GHQ pressured the Japanese side to translate their English-language draft of the new constitution into Japanese within just a few days. It is said that they used the word "atomic"—a taboo for the Japanese at the time—to intimidate them into speeding up the process, saying bluntly, "We have been enjoying your atomic sunshine." Upon hearing this, Yoshida was reportedly furious, stomping his foot and shouting, "What the hell was that?!" He sarcastically retorted, "GHQ stands for Go Home Quickly!"—a sentiment Jiro Shirasu is said to have agreed with.

In Japan, just before the end of the war, Masatomi Hatakeda, the governor of Niigata City with a population of 170,000, decided on a policy of "atomic bomb evacuation." Additionally, evacuation of civilians in response to air raids was promoted by civilian bureaucrats. Governor Akira Shimada of Okinawa is known for opposing the military in order to protect civilians during the Battle of Okinawa. As a result, while the military insisted on total national mobilization including civilians, the civilian officials aimed to protect civilians from the U.S. air raids, creating a clear conflict between the two. Consequently, in postwar Japan, there was a tendency to be critical of the U.S. air raids and atomic bombings, and the U.S. military was not viewed as liberators. At the same time, civilian officials who opposed the war and clashed with the military, as well as those who organized evacuations of civilians to protect them from U.S. air raids, were often respected.

Japanese journalist Soichiro Tahara once interviewed Henry Kissinger about the atomic bombings of Japan. He asked, "You dropped atomic bombs on Hiroshima and Nagasaki, killing a large number of completely innocent civilians. How does America intend to take responsibility for this?" Kissinger reportedly replied, "If we hadn't dropped the bombs on Hiroshima and Nagasaki, Japan would have launched a full-scale homeland battle. That battle would have caused the deaths of millions, perhaps over ten million Japanese people. By dropping the bombs, we significantly reduced that number, so in fact, Japan should be grateful to America."

==== European countries ====
In a 2016 survey, 41% of British respondents said the bombings were the wrong decision, while 28% said it was the right decision.

Alex Wellerstein, a nuclear historian at Stevens Institute of Technology, says that while the nations invaded by Japan were favor for the atomic bombings, Europeans generally have a cold view. Europeans are struck by the fact that the majority of Americans believe the atomic bombings of Hiroshima and Nagasaki were justified and morally right.

A 2025 international survey conducted across six Western countries revealed significant differences in public attitudes toward the moral justification of the atomic bombings of Hiroshima and Nagasaki. In European countries, a majority of respondents considered the bombings morally unjustified—81% in Germany, 78% in Italy, 75% in Spain, 57% in France, and 50% in the United Kingdom. In contrast, public opinion in the United States was more divided, with 38% saying the bombings were morally justified, 35% saying they were not, and 26% unsure. The results highlight a lasting divergence in views between Europe and the United States regarding the use of nuclear weapons in World War II.

==== Asian countries ====
In the Philippines, the atomic bombings of Hiroshima and Nagasaki are often seen as having contributed to the end of World War II and thus the end of Japanese occupation. However, there is also a critical perspective due to the country's history of American colonization. The Philippine-American War (1899–1902) and events like the Balangiga Massacre and General Jacob H. Smith's infamous order to "kill everyone over ten" foster a negative view of American imperialism. As a result, while some Filipinos view the U.S. as a liberator, others see it as an aggressor just like Japan, reflecting the complex legacy of American influence.

In South Korea, it is often suggested that the atomic bombings contributed to Korean independence. However, at the time, Korea was under Japanese colonial rule, and many Koreans had come to Japan as immigrants or wartime laborers. As a result, it is estimated that tens of thousands of Koreans were among the Hibakusha of the atomic bombings. This narrative of decolonization, however, often sidelined the actual Korean victims—those who were killed or exposed to radiation during the attacks. Korean hibakusha have expressed criticism toward both Japan and the United States. Jeon Wonsul, president of the Korean Atomic Bomb Victims Association, stated, "It was the United States that dropped the atomic bomb, and Japan that started the war. Seventy-eight years have passed, but neither the United States nor Japan has offered an apology or said anything about it." The differences in attitudes toward the atomic bombings were a barrier to understanding between South Koreans and Zainichi Koreans.

In Vietnam, due to its alignment with the Soviet Union during the Cold War, the official government view is that it was the Soviet Union's entry into the war—not the atomic bombings—that brought the Pacific War to an end. However, a few voices, such as that of Nguyễn Chí Thiện, argue that the atomic bombings were the decisive factor in Japan's surrender. On the other hand, the atomic bombings of Hiroshima and Nagasaki are also widely criticized. The Institute of Military Social Sciences and Humanities under Vietnam's Ministry of National Defense has published papers describing the use of Agent Orange during the Vietnam War as a form of chemical warfare, and discussing its brutality alongside that of the atomic bombings.

==== Countries in conflict with the U.S. ====
Sentiment is also very negative in countries that are in diplomatic conflict with the United States. In 1959, Che Guevara, when he visited Hiroshima, said, "America did a terrible thing. Aren't you Japanese angry about the atrocity that was perpetrated on you?" Cuban President Fidel Castro during a speech criticizing United States foreign policy said "We cannot ignore Hiroshima or Nagasaki, and the unnecessary use of Nuclear Weapons—a completely unnecessary use which, in any event, could have been used against military installations but instead fell on civilian populations of hundreds of thousands of inhabitants. It rang in the era of atomic terror in the world." Former Supreme Leader of Iran Ali Khamenei said, "The United States dropped one atomic bomb on the city of Hiroshima in August 1945, massacring 100,000 people in an instant. Such a hegemonic army as it is clearly shows that the U.S. is morally bankrupt, atheistic, and irreligious." In 2009, Venezuelan President Hugo Chávez stated at a joint press conference with Iranian President Mahmoud Ahmadinejad, "They're [the United States] the ones with the atomic bombs, and remember the Yankee imperialists dropped bombs on Hiroshima and Nagasaki". He also said that the United States should apologize for dropping atomic bombs on Japan at the end of World War II. On the 80th anniversary in 2025 of the atomic bombings of Hiroshima and Nagasaki, Nicaraguan Vice President Rosario Murillo condemned the attacks as crimes against humanity, noting that between 150,000 and 246,000 civilians were killed. She criticized those who still try to hide or obscure the identity of the perpetrators, emphasizing that Nicaragua has always clearly pointed them out. Murillo also drew a parallel between the bombings and the ongoing violence in Gaza, saying the same criminal and genocidal pattern continues today.

== Negative impact on U.S. military and foreign policy ==
The French political and strategy scientist Frédéric Saint Clair pointed out that the atomic bombings of Hiroshima and Nagasaki were etched into American military strategy as a "successful experience," leading the United States to act on the mistaken assumption that "subduing the enemy by force" would be effective in later wars—such as the Vietnam War and the Iraq War—thereby causing long-term negative consequences.

The events of August 6, 9, and 10, 1945, support the thesis that American militarists have kept in mind—and have continued to revive over the decades. Yet there have been many counterexamples. The disaster of the Bay of Pigs in 1961. The resounding fiasco of the Vietnam War, from 1955 to 1975. The interminable war in Afghanistan, launched in the wake of the events of September 11, 2001. The failure of the Iraq War, which began in 2003, despite the "victory" of the U.S. and the fall of the dictator—if one considers the chaos that has reigned in the region ever since. And this is not an exhaustive list.

It was also the American historian of modern Japan, John Dower, who pointed out that the United States' positive framing of its occupation of Japan and the atomic bombings later had negative consequences. He argued that Japan likely would have surrendered even without a U.S. invasion — as long as the U.S. had accepted the continued existence of the emperor, which it ultimately did.

Dower also criticized the Bush administration for promoting Japan as a successful case of democratization in a non-Western context. He pointed out that this not only ignored the ongoing and often controversial debates within Japan about the occupation period, but also failed to recognize the vast differences between Japan and Iraq. Despite these differences, the administration tried to use Japan as a model case.

As an example, Dower noted that Japan had already undergone democratic developments, such as the enactment of the Meiji Constitution after the Meiji Restoration and the Taisho Democracy. He also emphasized Japan's geographical isolation as an island nation, its long history of shared identity, and the relative absence of deep societal divisions based on religion or ethnicity.

This trend continued into 2024, with Lindsey Graham arguing that since the United States dropped two atomic bombs on Japan at the end of World War II, Israel should also use all kinds of bombs in the Gaza Strip. Tim Walberg and Randy Fine also shared the same view and made similar remarks.

== Influence for current international relations ==
The atomic bombings of Hiroshima and Nagasaki by the United States have frequently been discussed in international politics, often brought up in debates about the justification of war, criticism of the United States, and reasons for military expansion.

=== Russia ===
The fact that the U.S. is the only country to have dropped an atomic bomb on a city is an aspect that is used for diplomatic purposes. When Vladimir Putin annexed the Donetsk and Luhansk oblasts after invading Ukraine, he said the U.S. was the only country to have used nuclear weapons and set a "precedent". He also stated that neither the bombing of Germany nor the atomic bombing of Japan was militarily necessary; the purpose was to intimidate our country and the world. He wanted to use the atomic bombings of Hiroshima and Nagasaki as justification for the possible use of Russian nuclear weapons in the war in Ukraine.

However, at the G7 Hiroshima Summit in 2023, President Zelensky was invited and the "G7 Leaders' Hiroshima Vision on Nuclear Disarmament" was adopted. In both 2023 and 2024, representatives of Russia and Belarus were not invited to the Peace Ceremony in Hiroshima. Russian Ambassador to Japan Mikhail Galuzin called the response a "shameful measure" and said, "I have no idea which country committed the horrific civilian genocide of dropping the atomic bombs".

=== People's Republic of China ===
Politically China frequently criticized the U.S. for dropping atomic bombs on Hiroshima and Nagasaki. For example, on February 12, 1961, the People's Daily published a signature article titled "Between 'Hero' and 'Madman,'" condemning the act. In 1983, Hu Yaobang, then the top leader of the Chinese Communist Party, visited Japan, and one of his most significant stops was Nagasaki. The word "peace", written by Hu Yaobang, is still inscribed in Nagasaki's Peace Park. At the same time, some of its military leaders have stated that Japan tends to respect the strong in foreign relations, citing the atomic bombings by the United States, the invasion of Manchukuo by the Soviet Union, and the Tang dynasty in the past, and China should therefore strengthen its military power.

On July 5, 2021, Japan's deputy prime minister Tarō Asō said that if the People's Liberation Army were to invade Taiwan, Japan should join the United States militarily. On July 11, a Chinese military affairs commentary channel on Xigua Video argued that if Japan intervenes, China should make an exception to its no-first-use nuclear policy and strike the country until it surrenders. It claims that due to Japan's unique experience, nuclear deterrence would be doubly effective. Xigua Video took down the clip, but it was later reposted by a municipal committee of the Chinese Communist Party in Baoji City.

== Criticisms and discussions about Atomic Bomb Casualty Commission ==
Criticism and debate exist not only regarding the atomic bombings themselves but also concerning the Atomic Bomb Casualty Commission (ABCC), which conducted surveys on the aftermath of the bombings. The Atomic Bomb Casualty Commission (ABCC) was established in 1946 following a presidential directive from Harry S. Truman. The sole purpose of the organization was to conduct research on atomic bomb survivors because it was believed that "they would not be available again until a new world war occurred". Consequently, the organization studied the health of the hibakusha but did not provide them with any medical care. For this reason, the ABCC was criticized by the hibakusha as being experimental on human bodies.

After the atomic bombings, Japanese doctors wanted to understand and study the actual damage and conduct research to help treat the hibakusha. However, the GHQ did not allow Japanese researchers to study the current state of A-bomb damage. Regulations were particularly strict until 1946, resulting in a higher number of radiation-related deaths.

In one case, when a Zainichi Korean hibakusha fathered twins but died shortly after, the ABCC even attempted to recover the bodies of the deceased children. When hibakusha refused routine medical examinations, the ABCC threatened them with court-martial for war crimes. Furthermore, when hibakusha died, the ABCC would visit their homes in person to collect their bodies for autopsies. It is believed that at least 1,500 organs were sent to the Armed Forces Institute of Pathology in Washington, D.C.

== See also ==
- Hiroshima, by John Hersey
- Nuclear disarmament
- Nuclear weapons debate
- Cultural treatments of the atomic bombings of Hiroshima and Nagasaki
