= Harold Kirker =

American historian (b. 1921, d. 2018)

Harold Kirker hiking in the Dolomites in 1949

Harold Kirker (1921 – May 30, 2018) was an American historian (specializing in the History of American Architecture). Born in San Francisco, Kirker was a direct descendant of the mountain man James Kirker (1793–1852).

After starting at the University of California, Berkeley, Kirker enlisted in the US Army during World War II. Like some other young men with Boy Scout hiking experience, he was recruited into the 10th Mountain Division where he trained alongside Charles Grier Sellers at the high-altitude Camp Hale in Colorado in 1943. Kirker served with the 10th Mountain Division during the Italian campaign. During the war, he was awarded the Bronze Star. During a leave, he sought out George Santayana in Rome and was able to meet with him.

Immediately after World War II, although he had not yet been awarded his Bachelor of Arts degree he attended Harvard and earned a Master of Business Administration degree, but returned to Europe as a civilian employee for the US Army (and engaged in many climbing trips in the Alps in his free time). Kirker returned to the University of California, Berkeley where he was awarded his Bachelor of Arts degree in 1951. He then pursued graduate study in History at the University of California, Berkeley. He wrote his doctoral dissertation entitled "California Architecture in the Nineteenth Century: A Social History" under the direction of Professor Carl Bridenbaugh.

After earning his Ph.D. in 1957, Kirker taught at the Massachusetts Institute of Technology from 1957 to 1966 and then was called to the growing History Department of the University of California, Santa Barbara, in 1966 where he taught until 1991. At the University of California, Santa Barbara he modeled gentility and grace for his students. He returned to his native San Francisco in retirement and was appointed to the San Francisco City Landmarks Board in 1993.

Kirker died in San Francisco on May 30, 2018.

== Selected publications ==
- Harold Kirker, "Eldorado Gothic: Gold Rush Architects and Architecture," California Historical Society Quarterly, vol. 38 (1959), pp. 31–46
- Harold Kirker, "The Parrott Building, San Francisco, 1852," Journal of the Society of Architectural Historians, vol. 18 (1959), pp. 160–161
- Harold Kirker, California's Architectural Frontier: Style and Tradition in the Nineteenth Century (San Marino, Calif.: Huntington Library, 1960)
- Harold Kirker, "The Boston Exchange Coffee House," Old-Time New England, vol. 52 (1961), pp. 1–13
- Harold Kirker and Burleigh Taylor Wilkins, "Beard, Becker and the Trotsky Inquiry," American Quarterly, vol. 13 (1961), pp. 516–525
- Harold Kirker, "The New Theater, Philadelphia, 1791-1792," Journal of the Society of Architectural Historians, vol. 22 (1963), pp. 36–37
- Harold Kirker and James Kirker, Bullfinch’s Boston (New York: Oxford University Press, 1964)
- Harold Kirker, The Architecture of Charles Bulfinch (Cambridge: Harvard University Press, 1969)
- Harold Kirker, "The Bulfinch Drawings in the American Antiquarian Society," Proceedings of the American Antiquarian Society, vol 86 (April 1976), pp. 125–128
- Harold Kirker, "The Larkin House Revisted," California History, vol. 65 (1986), pp. 26–33
- Harold Kirker, "Santayana in Rome," Bulletin of the Santayana Society, vol. 8 (Fall, 1990), pp. 35–37
- Harold Kirker, Old Forms on a New Land: California Architecture in Perspective (Niwot, Colo.: Roberts Rinehart Publishers, 1991)
