= Janice J. Terry =

American historian of the modern Middle East

- Born: 1942; Cleveland, Ohio, U.S.
- Occupations: Historian, professor

Academic background
- Education: College of Wooster (BA); American University of Beirut (MA); University of London (PhD)

Academic work
- Discipline: Middle Eastern history
- Sub-discipline: Egypt, Palestine, Arab Americans
- Institutions: Eastern Michigan University
- Notable works: The Wafd, 1919–1952; U.S. Foreign Policy in the Middle East

Janice J. Terry (born 1942) is an American historian who works on modern Middle Eastern history.

Her research mainly looks at Egypt, Palestine, and Arab-American issues. She is professor emerita of history at Eastern Michigan University and has written several books, including The Wafd, 1919–1952 and U.S. Foreign Policy in the Middle East.

== Early life and education ==
Terry was born in 1942 in Cleveland, Ohio. She completed her Bachelor of Arts in History and English Literature at the College of Wooster in 1964. She then went on to receive a Master of Arts in Arab Studies from the American University of Beirut in 1966.

Later, she earned a Ph.D. in Oriental and African Studies from the University of London in 1968.

== Academic career ==
Terry joined the History Department at Eastern Michigan University in 1968. She was promoted to Associate Professor in 1972 and Professor in 1978. She taught courses in Middle Eastern studies there until she retired in 2005. After retirement, she was nominated for emeritus faculty status. She received the Ronald W. Collins Distinguished Faculty Award for senior teaching at Eastern Michigan University.

Apart from teaching, Terry has been active in Middle East studies. She served as co-editor of Arab Studies Quarterly from 1999, and became its editor in 2002. She has also served on the editorial board of H-Diplo.

== Scholarship ==
Terry's work focuses on modern Middle Eastern history. She has written about Egyptian political development, the Arab-Israeli conflict, and how the Western media covers the Middle East and the Islamic world.

Her books are known for using primary sources, including material from presidential libraries. Her 1982 book, The Wafd, 1919–1952: Cornerstone of Egyptian Political Power, is a historical study of Egyptian political development from World War I to the 1952 revolution. The book centres on the Wafd Party and its leaders. Her 1985 work, Mistaken Identity: Arab Stereotypes in Popular Writing, looks at bias and stereotyping of Arabs in biographies, histories, mysteries, and novels.

In U.S. Foreign Policy in the Middle East: The Role of Lobbies and Special Interest Groups (2005), Terry used primary sources to show how interest groups concerned with the Middle East influence and shape U.S. foreign policy.

She has also co-authored two volumes of World History: Since 1500 (Wadsworth, 2000). She also co-authored The Twentieth Century and Beyond: A Global History (McGraw-Hill, 2007). She also co-edited World History: A Comprehensive Reference Set (Facts On File, 2016). Her 2015 book, William Yale: Witness to Partition in the Middle East, WWI–WWII, was published by Rimal Publications. It was reviewed in the Journal of Palestine Studies and in the Washington Report on Middle East Affairs.

== Selected publications ==
- The Wafd, 1919–1952: Cornerstone of Egyptian Political Power (Third World Centre for Research and Publishing, 1982) ISBN 978-0861990009
- Mistaken Identity: Arab Stereotypes in Popular Writing (American-Arab Affairs Council, 1985) ISBN 978-0943182025
- U.S. Foreign Policy in the Middle East: The Role of Lobbies and Special Interest Groups (Pluto Press, 2005) ISBN 978-1849642484
- World History: Since 1500 (co-author, Wadsworth, 2000)
- The Twentieth Century and Beyond: A Global History (co-author, McGraw-Hill, 2007) ISBN 9780073206929
- World History: A Comprehensive Reference Set (co-editor, Facts On File, 2016) ISBN 9781438182476
- William Yale: Witness to Partition in the Middle East, WWI–WWII (Rimal Publications, 2015) ISBN 978-9963715244
