= Mokusatsu =

Japanese phrase or word

Mokusatsu (黙殺) is a Japanese word meaning "ignore", "take no notice of" or "treat with silent contempt". (Note: Per Verner Bickley, 'Language as the Bridge' (Bochner 2013, p. 108)) It is written with two kanji: 黙 (moku "silence") and 殺 (satsu "killing"). In 1945, the Japanese government used the word in its initial rejection of the Potsdam Declaration, the Allied demand that Japan surrender unconditionally in World War II. It has been argued that the word was misunderstood by the Allies and that the misunderstanding interrupted a negotiation for a peaceful end to the war. The consensus of modern historians, however, is that the Allies understood the word correctly.

The example of mokusatsu is frequently cited to argue that problems encountered by Japanese in the sphere of international politics arise from misunderstandings or mistranslations of their language.

== Usage ==
In 1945, the Japanese government used mokusatsu in its initial rejection of the Potsdam Declaration, in which the Allies demanded Japan surrender unconditionally in World War II. This was understood to mean that Japan had rejected those terms, which contributed to President Harry S. Truman's decision to carry out the atomic bombings of Hiroshima and Nagasaki, and implied that in spurning the terms, Japan had brought down on its own head the destruction of those two cities.

In 1950, an argument emerged claiming that mokusatsu had been misunderstood by the Allies due to a mistranslation that interpreted the word to signify ignore rather than withhold comment. Prewar editions of the Kenkyūsha Japanese-English dictionary defined mokusatsu as "take no notice of, ignore" or "treat with silent contempt". The 1954 edition added that it also meant "remain in a wise and masterly inactivity", but the 1974 edition did not.

== Context ==
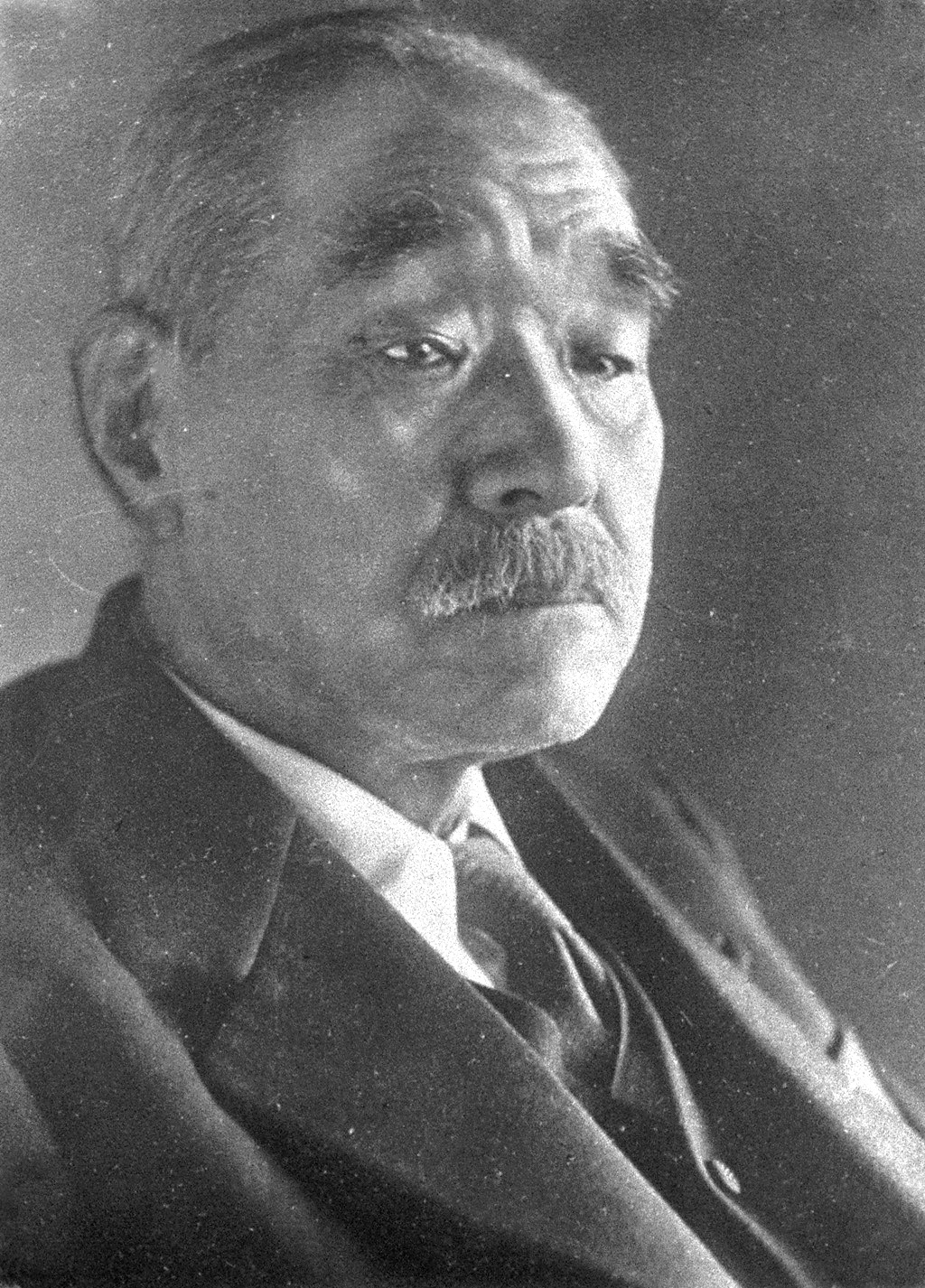
Premier Kantarō Suzuki used mokusatsu to dismiss the Allies' Potsdam Declaration in 1945, during World War II

The Allies were aware that within the Japanese government an attempt to reach a negotiated termination of hostilities had been underway, especially via diplomatic contacts with Moscow, which was still neutral. On 12 July 1945 Tōgō Shigenori, the Japanese Foreign Minister, asked Naotake Sato to inform Moscow, on behalf of the Emperor, that Japan had no alternative but to see the war through to the end using an all-out war effort if Britain and the United States were to persist in demanding an unconditional surrender.

The Potsdam Declaration presented one further occasion for mediation, but it was strongly opposed by War Minister General Korechika Anami, with backing from the army and navy chiefs of staff, all demanding that the Declaration be rejected with a broadcast containing a point by point rebuttal. The Army also demanded that the public be kept unaware of the Declaration. In a compromise, Tōgō gained a Cabinet consensus to have the Declaration translated and released to the public, but in a censored version that deleted mentions of an imminent "utter destruction of the Japanese homeland", "stern justice" for all war criminals, that disarmed soldiers would be allowed to return home to live constructive lives in peace, and comments about "self-willed military cliques". The version given to the public was issued by the 'tightly controlled press' through the Dōmei News Service.

In this form it appeared in the morning edition of the Asahi Shimbun on 28 July 1945, to designate the attitude assumed by the government to the Potsdam Declaration. This newspaper and others clearly stated that the ultimatum, which had not only been transmitted to the Japanese government diplomatically via Swiss intermediaries but also to the Japanese public via radio and airdropped leaflets, was formally rejected by the Imperial Government. Later that day in a press conference, the Premier Suzuki Kantarō himself publicly used it to dismiss the Potsdam Declaration as a mere rehash (yakinaoshi) of earlier rejected Allied proposals, and therefore, being of no value.

The key part of the statement (Note: 帝国政府としては、米・英・重慶三国の共同声明に関しては、何等重大なる価値あるものに非ずしてこれを黙殺するであろう) was translated into English by Dōmei Press as "the Japanese government ignores this, and we are determined to continue our bitter fight to the end."

Three postwar translations of Suzuki's statement in context exist:

I believe the Joint Proclamation by the three countries is nothing but a rehash of the Cairo Declaration. As for the Government, it does not find any important value in it, and there is no other recourse but to ignore it entirely [mokusatsu] and resolutely fight for the successful conclusion of this war.

My thinking is that the joint declaration is virtually the same as the Cairo Declaration. The government of Japan does not consider it having any crucial value. We simply mokusatsu-suru. The only alternative for us is to be determined to continue our fight till the end.

and:

I think that the joint statement is a rehash of the Cairo Declaration. The government does not think that it has serious value. We can only ignore [mokusatsu] it. We will do our utmost to complete the war to the bitter end.

Suzuki apparently recognized that the Potsdam Declaration flagged an intention to end a war which, in logistical terms, Japan was no longer capable of sustaining. However Article 6 stated that the militarists would be stripped of their authority and power forever, and the Japanese army was resolutely opposed to its own thorough dismantlement, and heavy pressure was brought to bear on the Prime Minister to have him reject the declaration.

Suzuki's stating that the declaration's terms would be literally "killed off by silent contempt" (mokusatsu) reflected this necessity of placating the extreme position of the army. Historian John Toland also argued decades later that Suzuki's choice of the term was dictated more by the need to appease the military, which was hostile to the idea of "unconditional surrender", than to signal anything to the Allies.

Although mokusatsu may not have been intended to communicate to the Allies a refusal to surrender, the Potsdam ultimatum nevertheless allowed for only one acceptable answer: unconditional surrender. Any other answer would, as the declaration warned, cause "prompt and utter destruction". It was only after the destruction of Hiroshima and Nagasaki by atomic bombs, two assassination attempts on the then Prime Minister Suzuki Kantarō, an attempted military coup against the Emperor, and declaration of war by the Soviet Union that the Emperor himself broadcast acceptance of the terms of the Potsdam Declaration that resulted in Japan's unconditional surrender, which ended the Pacific War.

== Postwar controversy ==
Five years after the end of World War II, Kazuo Kawai, a lecturer in Far Eastern history at Stanford University, first raised the idea that an incorrect translation directly led to the bombings of Hiroshima and Nagasaki. Kawai based his argument on notes and diaries written at the time, notes taken while he covered the discussions underway in Japan's Foreign Office regarding the Declaration. Kawai argued that both the choice of this term and the meaning given to it by Allied authorities led to a fatal 'tragedy of errors' involving both Japanese bureaucratic bungling and a 'deficiency in perception' by Japan's enemies. Kawai's point was then taken up by William J. Coughlin in a widely read article for Harper's magazine three years later.

In some reconstructions that espouse this interpretation, it is stated that it was probably Hasegawa Saiji, a translator for Dōmei Press, who translated this as: "The Japanese ignores this, and we are determined to continue our fight until the end" and the foreign press picked this up, taking "ignore" to mean "reject".

The NSA Technical Journal published an article endorsing this view, that the word's meaning was ambiguous, in which readers are warned of the consequences of not making ambiguities clear when translating between languages. (Note: The name is redacted but, according to Naimushin, the author was Harry G. Rosenbluh, a Research Analytic Specialist, Translator-Checker and Cryptologic Linguist at the US National Security Agency (Naimushin 2021, p. 92)) It concluded:

Some years ago I recall hearing a statement known as "Murphy's Law" which says that "If it can be misunderstood, it will be." Mokusatsu supplies adequate proof of that statement. After all, if Kantarō Suzuki had said something specific like "I will have a statement after the cabinet meeting", or "We have not reached any decision yet", he could have avoided the problem of how to translate the ambiguous word mokusatsu and the two horrible consequences of its inauspicious translation: the atomic bombs and this essay.

To this day, the argument, or myth, that mokusatsu was misunderstood, and that the misunderstanding interrupted a negotiation for a peaceful end to the war, still resurfaces from time to time.

The consensus of modern historians is that the Allies had understood the word correctly. Chalmers Johnson wrote in 1980:

Since the characters for mokusatsu mean 'silent kill', most informed commentators believe that the Allies did not mistranslate Suzuki. If he really meant 'no comment', that is not what he said – and mokusatsu does not imply it, even obliquely. However, the fact that the Japanese and Emmerson maintain that Suzuki's nuance was misunderstood illustrates the tendency of the Japanese to take refuge in alleged mistranslations.

Mitsumasa Yonai explained the declaration to Sōkichi Takagi at the time, "If one is first to issue a statement, he is always at a disadvantage. Churchill has fallen, America is beginning to be isolated. The government therefore will ignore it. There is no need to rush." Herbert Bix comments on this:

"No need to rush" directly contravened Article 5 of the Potsdam Declaration ("We shall brook no delay") and as a position that further strengthened the contemporary Western analysis that, as of 28 July, the Japanese, following the leadership of their emperor, had neither reversed their decision, nor loosened their will to fight to the finish, while making vague overtures for peace on a separate track. Suzuki's intention was not misunderstood.

== Sources ==
- Aslanyan, Anna (2021). Dancing on Ropes: Translators and the Balance of History. Profile Books. ISBN 978-1-788-16263-0.
- Bix, Herbert P. (Spring 1995). "Japan's Delayed Surrender: A Reinterpretation". Diplomatic History. 19 (2): 197–225. doi:10.1111/j.1467-7709.1995.tb00656.x. JSTOR 24912294.
- Bochner, Stephen, ed. (2013). Cultures in Contact: Studies in Cross-Cultural Interaction. Vol. 1. Elsevier. pp. 99–126. ISBN 978-1-483-18964-2.
- Butow, Robert (1967) [First published 1954]. Japan's Decision to Surrender. Stanford University Press.
- Coughlin, William J. (1953). "The Great Mokusatsu Mistake". Harper's. pp. 31–40.
- Ham, Paul (2012). Hiroshima Nagasaki. Random House. ISBN 978-1-448-12627-9.
- Hasegawa, Tsuyoshi (2009). Racing the Enemy: Stalin, Truman, and the Surrender of Japan. Harvard University Press. ISBN 978-0-674-03840-0 – via Google Books.
- Iokibe, Makoto (1990). "Japan Meets the United States for the Second Time". Daedalus. Showa: The Japan of Hirohito. 119 (3): 91–106. JSTOR 20025318.
- Johnson, Chalmers (Winter 1980). "Omote (Explicit) and Ura Implicit): Translating Japanese Political Terms". Journal of Japanese Studies. 6 (1): 89–115. doi:10.2307/132001. JSTOR 132001.
- Kawai, Kazuo (1950). "Mokusatsu, Japan's Response to the Potsdam Declaration". Pacific Historical Review. 19 (4): 409–414. doi:10.2307/3635822. JSTOR 3635822.
- Morton, Louis (1962). "Soviet Intervention in the War with Japan". Foreign Affairs. Vol. 40, no. 4. pp. 653–662. doi:10.2307/20029588. JSTOR 20029588.
- Naimushin, Boris (2021). "Hiroshima, Mokusatsu and Alleged Mistranslations" (PDF). English Studies at NBU. 7 (1): 87–96. doi:10.33919/esnbu.21.1.6. S2CID 236359017.
- Polizzotti, Mark (2018b). Sympathy for the Traitor: A Translation Manifesto. MIT Press. ISBN 978-026203799-0.
- Polizzotti, Mark (28 July 2018a). "Why Mistranslation Matters". The New York Times.
- Rogers, Everett M.; Bartlit, Nancy R. (2005). Silent Voices of World War II: When Sons of the Land of Enchantment Met Sons of the Land of the Rising Sun. Sunstone Press. ISBN 978-0-865-34423-5.
- Rosenbluh, Harry G. (1968). "Mokusatsu: One Word, Two Lessons" (PDF). NSA Technical Journal. XIII (4): 95–100.
- Sympathy for the Traitor: A Translation Manifesto. MIT Press. 2018b.
- Toland, John (2003) [First published 1970]. The Rising Sun: The Decline and Fall of the Japanese Empire, 1936–1945. New York: The Modern Library. ISBN 978-0-8129-6858-3.
- Torikai, Kumiko (2009). Voices of the Invisible Presence: Diplomatic interpreters in post-World War II Japan. John Benjamins Publishing. ISBN 978-9-027-29002-1 – via Google Books.
- Wheeler-Bennett, John; Nicholls, Anthony James (1974). Semblance of Peace. Palgrave Macmillan. ISBN 978-1-349-02240-3.
- Zanettin, Federico (2016). "'The deadliest error': translation, international relations and the news media". The Translator. 22 (3): 303–318. doi:10.1080/13556509.2016.1149754. S2CID 148299383.
