= Jamal Nassar =

Palestinian academic

Jamal R. Nassar
- جمال نصار
- Born: Jerusalem
- Education: B.A. from Jacksonville University; M.A. from University of South Florida; Ph.D. from University of Cincinnati
- Occupations: Scholar, Dean of the College of Social and Behavioral Sciences
- Employer: California State University, San Bernardino
- Known for: Middle Eastern politics, Dean at CSUSB

Jamal R. Nassar (Arabic: جمال نصار) is Dean of the College of Social and Behavioral Sciences at California State University, San Bernardino. He was born in Jerusalem, received a B.A. from Jacksonville University in 1972, a M.A. from the University of South Florida in 1974 and a Ph.D. from the University of Cincinnati in 1978. Afterwards, he joined the faculty at Illinois State University, where he served as chair of the Department of Politics and Government until accepting the post at CSUSB in 2007. His specialty is Middle Eastern politics.

== Publications ==
- Globalization and Terrorism: The Migration of Dreams and Nightmares
- Intifada: Palestine at the Crossroads
- The Palestine Liberation Organization: From Armed Struggle to the Declaration of Independence
- Change Without Borders: The Third World at the End of the Twentieth Century
- Politics and Culture in the Developing World: The Impact of Globalization. ISBN 9780205301119

Nassar has chaired national and international conferences on the Middle East, has addressed the United Nations on the Palestine question, and has been a consultant or expert witness in court cases.

Nassar was the editor of Arab Studies Quarterly from 1990–94. He remains on the editorial board of this and other scholarly journals.
