= List of naval and land-based operations in the Pacific Theater during World War II =

List of codenames of naval and land based operations in the Pacific Theater during World War II including Japan, Oceania, and the Pacific Rim.

== Axis ==
- A-Go (1944) (Japan) — plan to engage and destroy the U.S. Fleet during the Saipan landings
- AL (1942) (Japan) — invasion of the western Aleutians as a diversion from the attempted invasion of Midway Island
  - AOB (1942) (Japan) — seizure of Kiska Island
  - AQ (1942) (Japan) — seizure of Attu Island
  - Ke-Go (1943) (Japan) — evacuation of Kiska, Aleutians
- Nauru (1940) two German attacks on Nauru Island
  - First Attack (1940) sinking of five British, Australian and Norwegian boats (Nazi Germany)
  - Second Attack (1940) bombardment of Nauru (Nazi Germany)
- I-Go (1943) (Japan) — major air offensive to halt Allied advances on New Guinea and Guadalcanal
- FS (1944) (Japan) — proposal to isolate Australia by capturing New Caledonia, Samoa and Fiji
- K-1 (1942) (Japan) — reconnaissance and air-raid on Pearl Harbor
- Ka (1942) (Japan) — plan to destroy the U.S. Fleet and recapture Guadalcanal
- Ke (1943) (Japan) — evacuation of Guadalcanal
- Ketsu-Go (Decisive) (1945) — plan to counter U.S.-led invasion of Japan
- MI (1942) (Japan) — attempted seizure of Midway Island
- Mo (1942) (Japan) — aborted invasion of Port Moresby in New Guinea
- RE (1942) (Japan) — attempt to take Allied airfields on Milne Bay in New Guinea
- RO (1943) (Japan) — reinforcement of air forces at Rabaul
- Sho-Go (1945) (Japan) — naval reaction to U.S. invasion of Leyte
- SR (1942) (Japan) — seizure of Lae and Salamaua in southeast New Guinea
- TA (1944) (Japan) — attempt to repulse U.S. beachhead on Bougainville Island
- Tan No. 2 (1945) (Japan) — long-range Kamikaze mission on Allied fleet anchorage at Ulithi atoll
- TEN (1945) — air defense plan for Japan
- Ten-Go (1945) (Japan) — kikusui attacks and naval sortie to defend Okinawa.
- Z (1941) (Japan) — the Japanese attack on Pearl Harbor

== Allies ==
- Baus Au (1942) (United States) — plan to hide materiel in the Philippines before the fall for later use in guerilla warfare
- Cartwheel (1943–1944) (United States) (Australia) — Major offensives in the South West Pacific Area, aimed at isolating the major Japanese base at Rabaul
  - Chronicle (1943) (United States) — landings at Woodlark Island and Kiriwina, New Guinea
  - Toenails (1943) (United States) — landings at New Georgia
  - Postern (1943) (Australia) (United States) — assault on Lae, Papua New Guinea.
  - Goodtime (1943) — New Zealand landing at Treasury Islands.
  - Blissful (1943) (United States) — landing at Choiseul Island.
  - Cherry Blossom (1943) (United States) — landing at Bougainville Island.
  - Dexterity (1943–1944) (United States) (New Zealand) — landings at Arawe, Cape Gloucester and Saidor and the capture of Tuvulu aerodrome, on New Britain
- Causeway (planned for 1945, not executed) (United States) — planned invasion of Formosa (Taiwan); scrapped in favour of Operation Detachment
- Cleanslate (1943) (United States) — landings on the Russell Islands
- Cottage (1943) (United States) (Canada) — operation to recapture Kiska in the Aleutians
- Cyclone (1944) (United States) — airborne landings on Noemfoor, Dutch New Guinea
- Detachment (1945) (United States) — invasion of Iwo Jima
- Downfall (1945) — planned invasion of Japan
  - Olympic (planned for 1945, not executed) (United States) — first of two prongs of the invasion of Japan
  - Coronet (planned for 1946, not executed) (United States) (United Kingdom) (Canada) (Australia) (New Zealand) — second of two prongs of the invasion of Japan
- Fall River (1942) — reinforcement and airfield construction at Milne Bay, Papua New Guinea.
- Ferdinand (1942) (Australia) — coastwatchers on Japanese-occupied islands
- Flintlock (1944) (United States) — assault on Marshall Islands.
  - Catchpole (1944) (United States) — invasion of Eniwetok
  - Hailstone (1944) — naval air attack on Truk
- Forager (1944) (United States) — assault on Marianas Islands
- Galvanic (1943) (United States) — assault on Gilbert Islands
- Gratitude (1945) (United States) — US Navy raid into the South China Sea
- Iceberg (1945) (United States) (United Kingdom) (Australia) (New Zealand) — invasion of Okinawa
- Inmate (1945) (United Kingdom) (New Zealand) — naval bombardment of Truk
- Juneau (1945) (United States) — minesweeping operations at Okinawa.
- Lentil (1945) (United Kingdom) — air attack on Pangkalan Brandan, eastern Sumatra
- Majestic (planned for 1945, not executed) — planned Allied invasion of Kyushu. Scrapped in favor of Operation Olympic (under Operation Downfall)
- Meridian (1945) (United Kingdom) — air attack on Palembang
- Oboe (1945) (Australia) (United States) — assault on Borneo
- PM (1945) — removal of defensive minefield off Auckland, New Zealand
- Sandcrab (1943) — operation to recapture Attu in the Aleutians
- Starvation (1945) (United States) — aerial mining of Japanese ports and waterways
- Stalemate (1944) (United States) — assault on Peleliu and Palau Islands
- Vengeance (1943) (United States) — assassination of Japanese Admiral Isoroku Yamamoto
- Watchtower (1942) (United States) — invasion of Guadalcanal

== See also ==
- List of World War II military operations
