= Arab Studies Quarterly =

- Discipline: Arabist studies
- Language: English
- Edited by: Ibrahim G. Aoudé, University of Hawai'i-Mānoa, Honolulu

Publication details
- History: 1979–present
- Publisher: Pluto Journals & Center for Islamic and Middle Eastern Studies (CIMES), California State University (UK & USA)
- Frequency: quarterly
- Open access: Yes

Standard abbreviations
- ISO 4: Arab Stud. Q.

Indexing
- ISSN: 0271-3519 (print); 2043-6920 (web)

Links
- Journal homepage

Arab Studies Quarterly (ASQ) is an English-language academic journal devoted to Arabist studies. It was established in 1979 by the Professors Edward Said and Ibrahim Abu-Lughod. They envisioned the journal to be a platform for academic research to counter anti-Arab propaganda veiled by academic jargon. Since its inception, ASQ has been a refereed academic journal that publishes articles on the Arabs, their history and social and political institutions. In 2021, the journal was made open access for all issues published since 2008.

Articles appearing in this journal are indexed in the PAIS Bulletin and are annotated and indexed in Historical Abstracts; International Political Science Abstracts; America: History and Life; Political Science Abstracts; Periodica Islamica, and Index of Islamic Literature.

The current editor of the journal is Ibrahim Aoude of the University of Hawaii.

== See also ==
- Samih Farsoun, president of the Association of Arab American University Graduates
- Journal of Palestine Studies
- Jerusalem Quarterly
- Jamal Nassar, ASQ editor, 1990–94
