= Frances V. Harbour =

Frances Vryling Harbour (1953–2013) was an associate professor of government at George Mason University, in the United States. She died on December 19, 2013.

== Information ==
She is a founding member and past president of the International Ethics Section of the International Studies Association (ISA) and a former John D. and Catherine T. MacArthur fellow in international peace and security studies. She has written on the ethics of weapons of mass destruction and just war philosophy. Her book Thinking About International Ethics: Moral Theory and Cases from American Foreign Policy looks at the Realism-Idealism debate in terms of development of the international chemical weapons treaty, the decision to drop the atomic bomb on Hiroshima and Nagasaki, and lastly at the debate over whether to withdraw China's Most Favored Nation trade status on account of its human rights violations. The International Ethics Section of the ISA created a graduate student paper award in her name.
