= Burleigh Taylor Wilkins =

American philosopher (1932–2015)

Academic background
- Education: Princeton University (PhD)
- Thesis: Natural Law, Human Nature, and Natural Rights in Edmund Burke: A Study in the History of Ideas (1965)
- Doctoral advisor: Gregory Vlastos

Academic work
- Era: Contemporary philosophy
- Region: Western philosophy
- Institutions: University of California, Santa Barbara

Burleigh Taylor Wilkins (July 1, 1932 in Bridgetown, Virginia - October 13, 2015 in Tampa, Florida) was a professor in the Department of Philosophy of the University of California, Santa Barbara.

He studied at Duke University, (B.A. 1952); Harvard University (M.A., 1954); and Princeton University (M.A., 1963, Ph.D., 1965). He previously taught history at Shorter College in Rome, Georgia from 1956–57; humanities at the Massachusetts Institute of Technology, in Cambridge, Massachusetts from 1957–60; philosophy at Princeton University (1960–61, 1963) and at Rice University (1965-1967). He taught at the University of California, Santa Barbara, from 1968 until 2012.

He has written a biography on Carl L. Becker, and books on the philosophies of Edmund Burke, Hegel, and Karl Popper.

== Publications ==
- Carl Becker: a Biographical Study in American Intellectual History ISBN 978-0-262-23005-6
- The Problem of Burke's Political Philosophy ISBN 978-0-19-827162-8
- Hegel's Philosophy of History ISBN 0-8014-0819-9
- Has History Any Meaning?: A Critique of Popper's Philosophy of History ISBN 0-8014-1187-4
- Terrorism and Collective Responsibility ISBN 0-415-04152-X
