= Tsuyoshi Hasegawa =

Japanese-American historian

- Born: 23 February 1941 (age 85); Tokyo, Japan
- Citizenship: United States
- Education: Tokyo University, University of Washington
- Occupations: Professor, historian, author
- Employer: University of California, Santa Barbara
- Notable work: The February Revolution of Petrograd, 1917 (1981); Racing the Enemy: Stalin, Truman, and the Surrender of Japan (2005); Crime and Punishment in the Russian Revolution (2017); The February Revolution, Petrograd 1917 (2017)
- Awards: Robert Ferrell Award from the Society for Historians of American Foreign Relations (2006), for Racing the Enemy
- Website: www.history.ucsb.edu/emeriti/tsuyoshi-hasegawa/

Tsuyoshi Hasegawa (長谷川 毅, Hasegawa Tsuyoshi; born 23 February 1941) is a Japanese-American historian specializing in modern Russian and Soviet history and the relations between Russia, Japan, and the United States. He taught at the University of California, Santa Barbara, where he was director of the Cold War Studies program until his retirement in 2016.

Hasegawa was born in Tokyo and received his undergraduate education at Tokyo University. He studied international relations and Soviet history at University of Washington, where he earned his doctoral degree in 1969. He became a naturalized American citizen in 1976. Among his awards and fellowships are Fulbright-Hays Research Abroad (1976–77), NEH grant (2002–03), SSRC grant (2002–03), Rockefeller Belagio Center Fellowship (2011), and a Fulbright Fellowship (2012).

He is known for Racing the Enemy: Stalin, Truman, and the Surrender of Japan (2005), a study of diplomacy and the end of the allied war against Japan. The book won the 2005 Robert Ferrell Award from the Society for Historians of American Foreign Relations (SHAFR).

Hasegawa's research also includes the political and social history of the Russian Revolution of 1917 and of Japanese–Soviet relations.

== Scholarship and influence ==
His scholarship is divided into three fields.

=== February Revolution and Russian Revolution ===
The first is on the Russian Revolution. He published The February Revolution: Petrograd 1917 in 1980. Hasegawa later returned to the February Revolution. He revised and updated the original book, re-evaluating the role of the liberals as active participants in the revolution. The revised and expanded edition, The February Revolution, Petrograd, 1917: The End of the Tsarist Regime and the Birth of Dual Power, was published in 2017.

He has embarked on new research on a social history of the Russian Revolution, focusing on crime, police, and mob justice. He published, Crime and Punishment in the Russian Revolution: Mob Justice and Police in Petrograd, in 2017.

His life-long interest in the February Revolution has culminated in the publication: The Last Tsar: the Abdication of Nicholas II and the Fall of the Romanovs (Basic Books: 2024).

=== Russo-Japanese relations ===
Recent Russo-Japanese relations are the second area on which Hasegawa has done research. His research resulted in the publication The Northern Territories Dispute and Russo-Japanese Relations in 1998. In these volumes Hasegawa examines the tortuous relations between Russia and Japan over the territorial dispute over what the Japanese call the "Northern Territories" and what the Russian call "the southern Kuril islands."

=== End of war with Japan ===
The third area of research Hasegawa has conducted is an international history involving the Soviet Union, the United States, and Japan in ending the allied war with Japan. As the United States dropped its first atomic bombs on Hiroshima on 6 August 1945, 1.6 million Soviet troops launched a surprise attack on the Japanese forces that occupied Eastern Asia on the 9 August 1945. Hasegawa published a book, Racing the Enemy: Stalin, Truman, and the Surrender of Japan (2005), challenging the widely accepted orthodox view that the atomic bombings on Hiroshima and Nagasaki were the most decisive factor in Japan's decision to surrender ending the war against Japan.

Hasegawa puts forward the view that the Soviet entry into the war, by breaking of the Neutrality Pact, played a more important role than the atomic bombs in Japan's decision to surrender. That view is in contrast to earlier critics of the bombing, such as Gar Alperovitz, who argued that US President Harry S. Truman's underlying objective was showcasing the might of the US military as a deterrent to the ambitions of the Soviet leader Joseph Stalin. According to the Australian historian Geoffrey Jukes, "[Hasegawa] demonstrates conclusively that it was the Soviet declaration of war, not the atomic bombs, that forced the Japanese to surrender unconditionally." His view has received criticism. The most balanced and spirited discussion of this book is given in an H-Diplo roundtable discussion with Gar Alperovitz, Michael Gordin, David Holloway, Richard Frank, and Baron Bernstein.

== Publications ==
- The February Revolution of Petrograd, 1917 (U. Washington Press, 1981).
- As editor: The Soviet Union Faces Asia: Perceptions and Policies (Sapporo: Slavic Research Center, 1987).
- Roshia kakumeika petorogurado no shiminseikatsu ["Everyday Life of Petrograd during the Russian Revolution"] (Chuokoronsha, 1989).
- Edited with Alex Pravda, Perestroika: Soviet Domestic and Foreign Policies (London: Sage Publication, 1990).
- Edited with Jonathan Haslam and Andrew Kuchins, Russia and Japan: An Unresolved Dilemma between Distant Neighbors (UC Berkeley, International and Area Studies, 1993).
- The Northern Territories Dispute and Russo-Japanese Relations. Vol. 1: Between War and Peace, 1967–1985. Vol. 2: Neither War Nor Peace, 1985–1998. (Berkeley: International and Area Studies Publications, University of California at Berkeley, 1998.
- Racing the Enemy: Stalin, Truman, and the Surrender of Japan. The Belknap Press of Harvard University Press, 2006. ISBN 978-0-674-01693-4
- As editor, The End of the Pacific War: Reappraisals (Stanford University Press, 2007).
- Edited with Togo Kazuhiko, East Asia’s Haunted Present: Historical Memories and the Resurgence of Nationalism (Westport, Connecticut and London: Praeger Security International, 2008).
- As editor, The Cold War in East Asia, 1945-1991 (Woodrow Wilson Center Press and Stanford University Press, 2011).
- The February Revolution, Petrograd, 1917: The End of the Tsarist Regime and the Birth of Dual Power (Brill, 2017).
- Crime and Punishment in the Russian Revolution: Mob Justice and Police in Petrograd (Belknap Press of Harvard University Press, 2017).
- ——— (8 July 2020), "The History of My Career", H-Diplo, Learning the Scholar’s Craft: Reflections of Historians and International Relations Scholars
- The Last Tsar: the Abdication of Nicholas II and the Fall of the Romanovs (Basic Books, 2024).
