= Kaichi =

- Gender: Male

Origin
- Origin: Japanese
- Meaning: Different meanings depending on the kanji used

Kaichi (written: 嘉一 or 海智) is a masculine Japanese given name. Notable people with the name include:

- Kaichi Hirate (1909–1946), Imperial Japanese Army soldier
- Kaichi Uchida (内田 海智; born 1994), Japanese tennis player
- Kaichi Watanabe (渡邊 嘉一; 1858–1932), Japanese engineer
