= Sugamo Prison =

Former prison in Tokyo, Japan

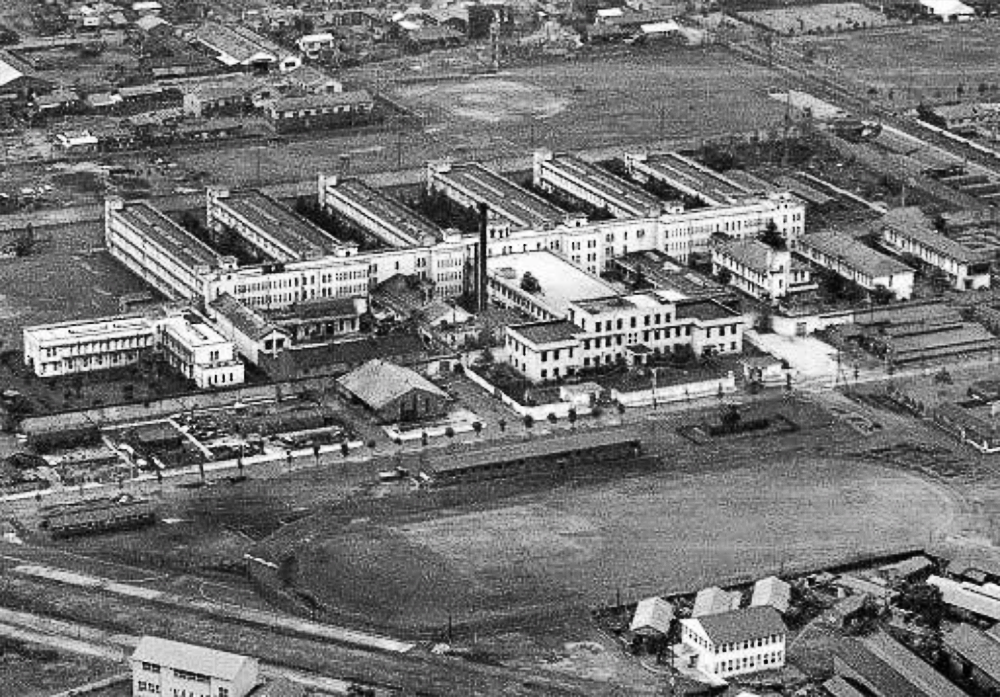
- Sugamo Prison in 1949

- Location within Japan
- Location: Tokyo, Japan; 35°43′46″N 139°43′04″E
- Status: Closed
- Opened: 1895
- Closed: 1971

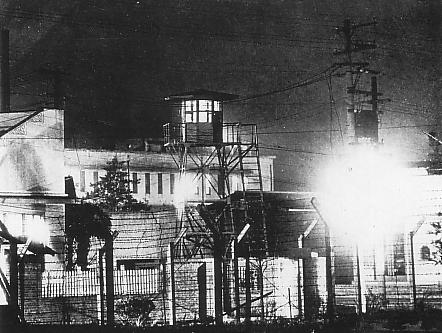
Sugamo Prison in December 1948

Sugamo Prison (Sugamo Kōchi-sho, Kyūjitai: 巢鴨拘置所, Shinjitai: 巣鴨拘置所) was a prison in Tokyo, Japan. It was located in the district of Ikebukuro, which is now part of the Toshima ward.

== History ==
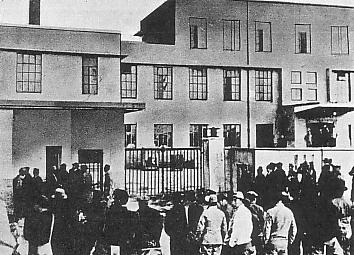
Sugamo Prison in 1945

Sugamo Prison was built in 1895, using the prisons of Europe as a model. By the 1930s it became known for housing political prisoners, including many communists and other dissenters who fell foul of the Peace Preservation Laws in the 1930s and 1940s. Allied spies were also incarcerated there, including Richard Sorge, who was hanged in the prison on November 7, 1944. The prison also was used to hold captured Allied officers during World War II as well as airmen.

The prison was not damaged during the bombing of Tokyo in World War II, and was taken over by the Allied occupation forces during the occupation of Japan to house suspected war criminals as they awaited trial before the International Military Tribunal for the Far East. After the conclusion of the trials, Sugamo Prison was used to incarcerate some of the convicted and was the site of the execution of two Japanese Prime Ministers included among seven inmates sentenced to death by hanging on December 23, 1948. The prison was also the execution site for 51 Japanese war criminals who were condemned in the Yokohama War Crimes Trials, while a further 803 convicted in the trials served their prison terms there. The last 7 executions were carried out on April 7, 1950.

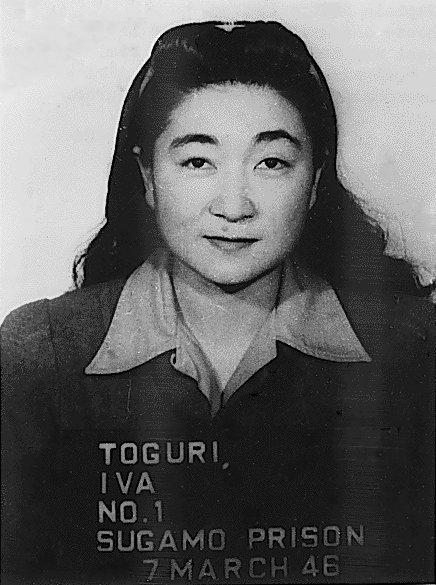
Mug shot of Iva Toguri D'Aquino, Tokyo Rose, taken at Sugamo Prison in March 1946

The original compound was only 2.43 hectares (6.0 acres) in size. The construction of exterior fencing expanded the facility to double the original size. After being captured and re-purposed by Allied forces, the facility was operated by the United States' Eighth Army. Under the U.S. occupation, Sugamo Prison was administered by 400–500 soldiers. There were approximately 2500 military personnel assigned to duty at the prison, but no more than 500 at any given time. The prison was operated by occupation authorities from December 1945 to May 1952. The structure housed some 2000 Japanese war criminals during its operation.

The prisoners ate Japanese food prepared by Japanese personnel and served by the prisoners themselves. There were occasions when former Prime Minister Hideki Tojo served food to all other Class A prisoners. Some of the vegetables used in the meals were grown within the compound. On May 31, 1958, the last 18 Japanese war criminals still serving time in Sugamo Prison were paroled.

After the end of the occupation of Japan, Sugamo Prison passed to Japanese civilian government control. Most of the remaining war criminals were pardoned or paroled by the government. In 1962 its function as a prison ended. In 1971 the prison buildings were dismantled.

In 1978, the Sunshine 60 Building, at its completion the tallest skyscraper in Japan, was built on the former site of Sugamo Prison. All that is left to commemorate the prison is a stone on which is engraved, in Japanese, "Pray for Eternal Peace." A water drainage outlet from the prison has been preserved in the park in front of the Tokyo International University Ikebukuro Campus, which stands on part of the former prison grounds.

== Notable inmates ==
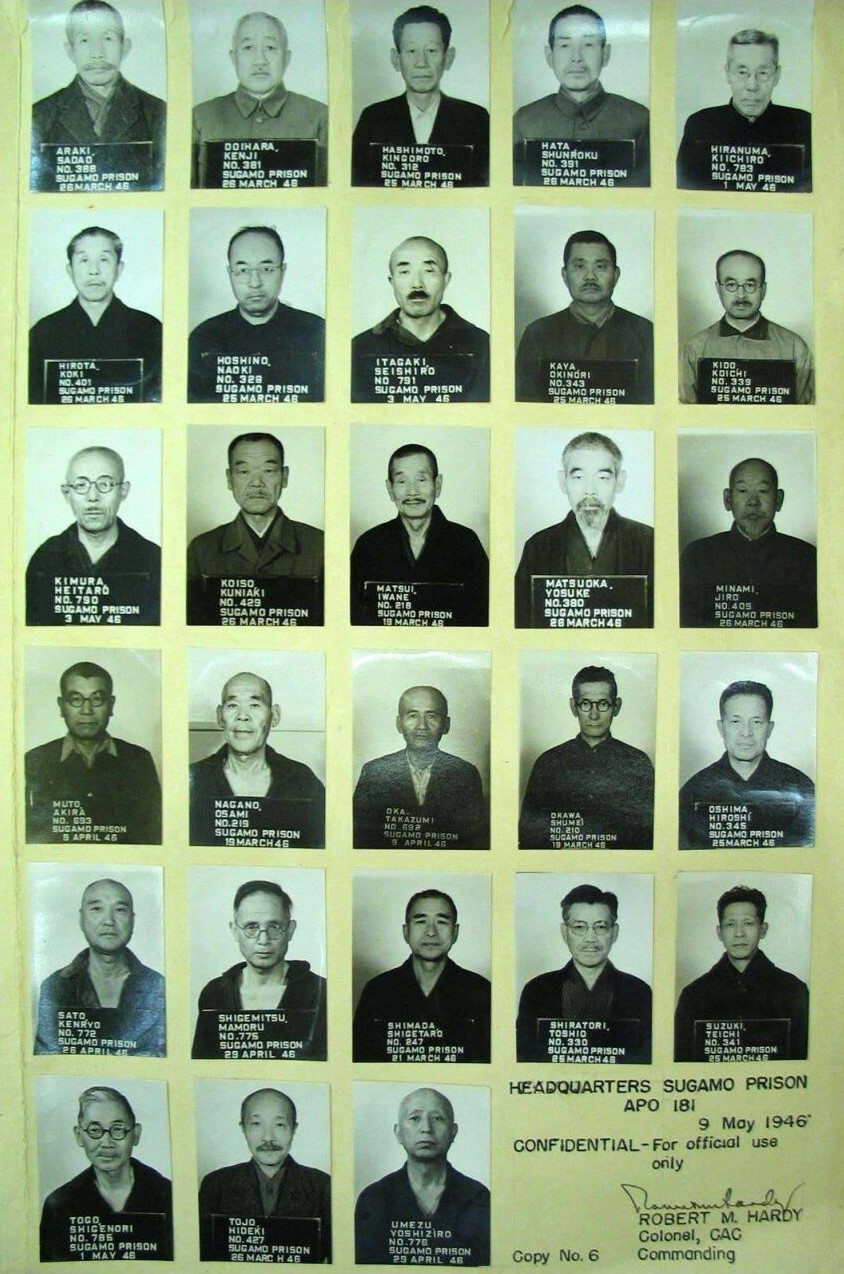
Photograph sheet of 28 suspected war criminals

- Iva Toguri D'Aquino: American-Japanese suspected collaborator known as "Tokyo Rose". Sentenced to 10 years in prison in the United States for treason, which she served in the United States. Released in 1956, and pardoned in 1977. Died in 2006.
- Minister of Foreign Affairs Yōsuke Matsuoka: died in prison in 1946, before he could be brought to trial.
- Marshal Admiral Osami Nagano: died in prison during his trial in 1947.
- Vice Minister of Munitions Nobusuke Kishi: ran plundering of China, planned and ran the war, key deputy to Tojo, later prime minister (LDP) 1957–1960. Released after charges dropped in 1948. Died in 1987.
- Matsutarō Shōriki: secretary of the Political Police in Tokyo, later media mogul, LDP politician, chief of the Information Department of the Interior Ministry. Released in 1948 after charges dropped. Died in 1969.
- Yoshio Kodama: drug trafficking operations and Intelligence agent in China, rear admiral in the Imperial Japanese Navy, Yakuza head. Released in 1948 after charges dropped. Died in 1984.
- Japanese fascist leader Ryōichi Sasakawa: released in 1948 after charges dropped. Died in 1995.
- Ambassador Toshio Shiratori: died in prison in 1949.
- General Yoshijirō Umezu: chief of the Imperial Japanese Army General Staff. Died in prison in 1949.
- Prime Minister Kuniaki Koiso: also an IJA general and governor-general of Korea. Died in prison in 1950.
- Lieutenant General Shigeru Sawada: released in 1950. Died in 1980.
- Minister of Foreign Affairs Mamoru Shigemitsu: paroled in 1950, and died in 1957.
- Lieutenant General Takaji Wachi: paroled in 1950 and died in 1978.
- Minister of Foreign Affairs Shigenori Tōgō: died in prison in 1950.
- Lieutenant General Isamu Yokoyama: convicted of having command responsibility for vivisection and other human medical experiments performed at the Kyushu Imperial University on downed Allied airmen. Sentenced to death in 1948, but later reprieved. Died in prison in 1952.
- Prime Minister Hiranuma Kiichirō: paroled in 1952, and died a few months later.
- Lieutenant General Sadae Inoue: paroled in 1953 and died in 1961.
- Advisor Kōichi Kido: paroled in 1955, and died in 1977.
- Field Marshal Shunroku Hata: paroled in 1955 and died in 1962.
- General Jirō Minami: governor-general of Korea. Paroled in 1954 and died in 1955.
- General Sadao Araki: paroled in 1955 and died in 1966.
- Admiral Shigetarō Shimada: minister of the Imperial Japanese Navy. Paroled in 1955 and died in 1976.
- Lieutenant General Teiichi Suzuki: paroled in 1955, and died in 1989.
- Minister of Finance Okinori Kaya: paroled in 1955, and died in 1977.
- Lieutenant General Hiroshi Ōshima: paroled in 1955, and died in 1975.
- Lieutenant General Eitaro Uchiyama: allowed the execution of American airmen shot down between April and August 1945 in the region of Japan under control of the 15th Area Army. Paroled in 1958, and died in 1973.
- Lieutenant General Michio Kunitake: Uchiyama's chief of staff, sentenced to 3 years of hard labor in 1947 and died in 1981.
- General Naoki Hoshino: paroled in 1958, and died in 1978.
- Tsunesaburō Makiguchi: first president of the Sōka Kyōiku Gakkai, died in prison in 1944.
- Lieutenant Generals Tadaichi Wakamatsu, Rimpei Kato, Goro Isoya, Choho Mononobe, Hiroshi Nukada, Bunro Saeki and Colonel Okikatsu Arao: high-ranking staff officers convicted for their involvement in the abuse of Allied POWs aboard 'hell ships', sentenced to prison terms ranging from 1 to 18 years.

== Executed inmates ==
- Hotsumi Ozaki: executed for treason in 1944.
- Richard Sorge: Soviet spy, executed by the Japanese in 1944.
- Captain Kaichi Hirate: permitted the mistreatment and murder of Allied POWs. Executed in 1946.
- General Kenji Doihara: chief of intelligence services in Manchukuo. Executed in 1948.
- Prime Minister Kōki Hirota: executed in 1948.
- General Seishirō Itagaki: Japanese war minister. Executed in 1948.
- General Heitarō Kimura: commander of the Japanese Burma Area Army. Executed in 1948.
- Lieutenant General Akira Mutō: chief of staff of the Japanese Fourteenth Area Army. Executed in 1948.
- General Hideki Tojo: commander of Kwantung Army and later the prime minister. Executed in 1948.
- Toshiaki Mukai and Tsuyoshi Noda: perpetrators of the hundred man killing contest during the Nanjing Massacre. Extradited to China and executed in 1948.
- Major General Yoshitaka Kawane and Colonel Kurataro Hirano: convicted of having command responsibility in the Bataan Death March. Executed in 1949.
- Lieutenant Sadaaki Konishi: convicted of torturing prisoners in a prison camp in the Philippines. Executed in 1949.
- Lieutenant General Tasuku Okada: ordered the massacre of 38 U.S. POWs. Executed in 1949.

== See also ==
- Landsberg Prison in Bavaria, Germany
- Spandau Prison in West Berlin
