= Best Wishes for Tomorrow =

- DVD cover
- Kanji: 明日への遺言
- Directed by: Takashi Koizumi
- Screenplay by: Takashi Koizumi; Roger Pulvers
- Based on: Nagai Tabi by Shōhei Ōoka
- Produced by: Masato Hara; Masao Nagai
- Starring: Makoto Fujita; Sumiko Fuji; Robert Lesser; Fred McQueen; Richard Neil
- Cinematography: Shoji Ueda
- Edited by: Hideto Aga
- Music by: Takashi Kako
- Distributed by: Asmik Ace Entertainment, Inc.
- Release dates: October 27, 2007 (Tokyo International Film Festival); March 1, 2008 (Japan)
- Running time: 110 minutes
- Country: Japan
- Language: Japanese

Best Wishes for Tomorrow (Japanese: 明日への遺言, Hepburn: Ashita e no yuigon) is a 2007 Japanese drama film directed by Takashi Koizumi, based on the novel Nagai Tabi (A Long Journey) by Shōhei Ōoka. It stars Makoto Fujita as Lieutenant General Tasuku Okada during the Yokohama War Crimes Trials.

== Plot summary ==
The film depicts the war crimes trial of Lieutenant General Tasuku Okada, who ordered the execution of 38 captured US prisoners of war, after he considered them to be war criminals for the war time fire bombing of Nagoya. The movie seeks to call attention to supposed American war crime culpability in the fire and atomic bombings of Japan.
