= May 1915 Triple Entente declaration =

Declaration condemning the Armenian Genocide

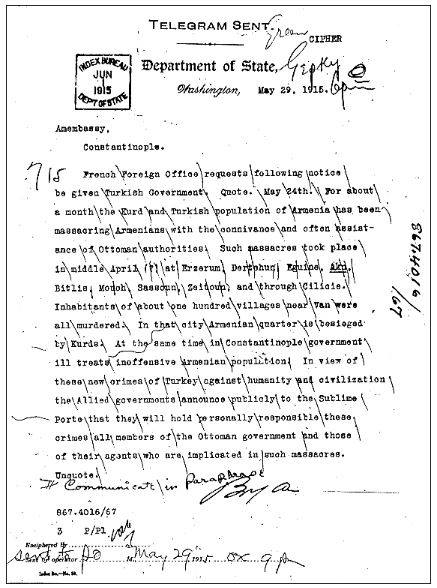
Version of the declaration forwarded to the Ottoman Empire by the United States State Department

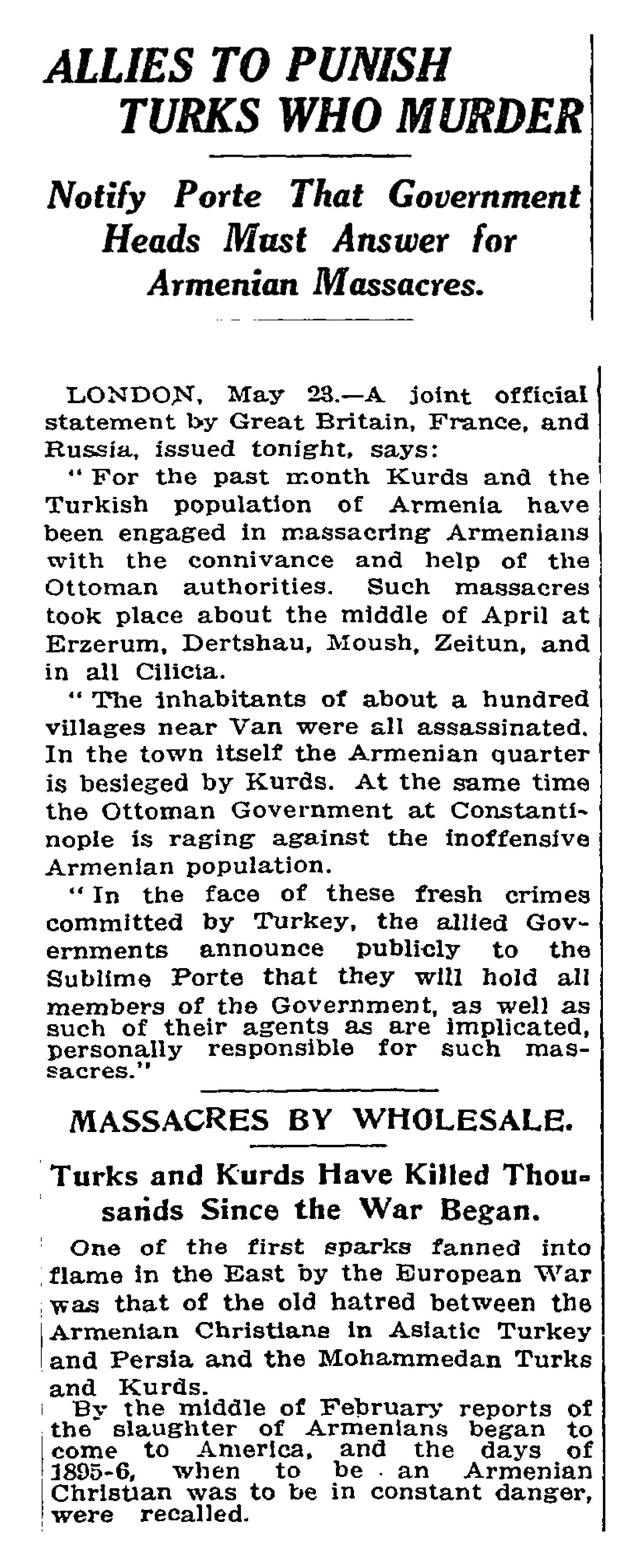
Coverage on the front page of The New York Times, 24 May 1915

On 24 May 1915, on the initiative of Russia, the Triple Entente—Russia, France, and the United Kingdom—issued a declaration condemning the ongoing Armenian genocide carried out in the Ottoman Empire and threatening to hold the perpetrators accountable. This was the first use of the phrase "crimes against humanity" in international diplomacy, which later became a category of international criminal law after World War II.

== Background ==
The Committee of Union and Progress seized absolute power in the Ottoman Empire in a 1913 coup and entered World War I in November 1914. This laid the groundwork for the genocide of the Empire's Armenian population, underway by April 1915. Ottoman paramilitaries also massacred many Christians (both Armenians and Syriac Christians) in the areas of Persia around Urmia that were occupied by the Ottoman Empire during the Persian campaign. After some areas were captured by Russia, which publicized the atrocities, these massacres, as well as the Armenian defense of Van, were widely covered in world newspapers during March and April 1915.

== Content ==
Throughout the spring of 1915, information had been reaching Russia about the genocide of the Armenians, most notably a detailed report that arrived in Tbilisi, the capital of the viceroyalty of the Caucasus on 18 April 1915. At the suggestion of the Viceroy Illarion Vorontsov-Dashkov, on 20 April 1915, Gevorg V, the Catholicos of the Armenian Apostolic Church, sent an appeal to the Russian Foreign Minister Sergei Sazonov asking him to publicize the genocide. Accordingly, Sazonov passed on the appeal from Gevorg to the neutral nations of the United States and Italy, asking for their ambassadors to the Sublime Porte to protest against the genocide. After the Ottoman empire entered the war, Italy and the United States became the joint protecting powers for the interests of Britain, France and Russia in the Ottoman empire. On April 27 1915, Count George Bakhmeteff, the Russian ambassador in Washington, passed on Gevorg's appeal to President Woodrow Wilson asking for the United States "in the name of humanity and our holy Christian faith" to do something to stop the genocide. On the next day, a joint conference was held where Henry Morgenthau Sr. and Eugenio Garroni, the American and Italian ambassadors to the Sublime Porte, met with Ottoman ministers only to receive a blanket denial with the ministers claiming that the Armenians were being relocated for their own protection.

Dissatisfied with the response that Morgenthau and Garroni were receiving in Constantinople, Sazonov later on 28 April wired a cable to Théophile Delcassé, the French foreign minister arguing the Allies should release a joint statement promising to punish the Ottoman officials after the Allied victory, saying this was the only way at present to stop the genocide. On 5 May 1915, Sazonov again pressed for a joint statement. On 6 May, appeals for help from Gevorg were passed on to King George V and President Raymond Poincaré. On 11 May 1915, Sazonov passed on a draft statement to the Foreign Office and the Quai d'Orsay that denounced "these fresh crimes of Turkey against Christianity and civilization".

Russia initially suggested the wording "crimes against Christianity and civilization", but France and the United Kingdom insisted that this be changed to "crimes against humanity and civilization". In November 1914, the Sublime Porte had proclaimed a jihad (holy war) against Russia, Britain and France with the sultan-caliph Mehmed V issuing the declaration of jihad on 4 November 1914 that called upon all Muslims throughout the world to fight against Britain, France and Russia. As both the British empire and the French empire had millions of Muslim subjects, there were serious concerns in both London and Paris about the loyalty of their Muslim subjects, whom it was believed might rebel. The French had a massive number of Muslim soldiers from the Maghreb fighting in their army while much of the Indian Army was Muslim. In February, the Muslim 5th Light Infantry regiment of the Indian Army mutinied in Singapore, an incident that at the time was believed to be a response to the Ottoman call for jihad. Sir Edward Grey, the British Foreign Secretary together with Delcassé objected that the Russian draft played into the Ottoman line that the war was a religious war. At the insistence of Grey and Delcassé, the references to Christianity were removed.

The final version of the declaration read:

For about a month the Kurd and Turkish populations of Armenia has been massacring Armenians with the connivance and often assistance of Ottoman authorities. Such massacres took place in middle April (new style) at Erzerum, Dertchun, Eguine, Akn, Bitlis, Mush, Sassun, Zeitun, and throughout Cilicia. Inhabitants of about one hundred villages near Van were all murdered. In that city Armenian quarter is besieged by Kurds. At the same time in Constantinople Ottoman Government ill-treats inoffensive Armenian population. In view of those new crimes of Turkey against humanity and civilization, the Allied governments announce publicly to the Sublime Porte that they will hold personally responsible [for] these crimes all members of the Ottoman government and those of their agents who are implicated in such massacres.

The declaration was printed in newspapers throughout the world.

== Ottoman response ==
The Ottoman Empire also hastily issued the Temporary Law of Deportation (Tehcir Law) on 27 May in order to give its actions the cover of legality; historian Uğur Ümit Üngör connects this directly with the May 24 Allied declaration.

On 28 May 1915, the State Department received an official copy of the declaration, which was passed on to Morgenthau the next day. On 3 June 1915, Morgenthau presented the declaration to the Grand Vizier, Said Halim Pasha. On 4 June 1915, Said Halim Pasha presented Morgenthau with a note that was largely written by diplomats from the German embassy in Constantinople that denied all massacres, claimed that the Armenian community were collectively guilty of treason, and stated that it was necessary for the Sublime Porte to forcibly relocate them for their own good. The Ottoman government issued a lengthy response to the declaration, dismissing all the charges as lies and claiming, "It is completely false that there have been massacres of Armenians in the Empire." Although it acknowledged that Armenians were deported, the response insisted that the deportations were restricted to the war zones and motivated by an alleged national security emergency caused by mass uprising of Armenians, while accusing Armenians of massacring Muslims. Sociologist Levon Chorbajian considers this response as the beginning of Armenian genocide denial, which has been echoed in later instances of denial.

== Legacy ==
The precedent set by the 1915 declaration led directly to a British suggestion at the Paris peace conference in 1919 for an international court to try the leaders of the defeated nations, most notably Wilhelm II, for war crimes and crimes against humanity. However, the American president Woodrow Wilson, was staunchly opposed, and the proposed international court was never created. In May 1919, the British seized 67 leaders of the Committee of Union and Progress from the prison in Constantinople from where they were being held and took them to a prison to Malta as a prelude to trying them. Under the terms of the Treaty of Sèvres in 1920, the Allies were granted the right to try Ottoman officials for the genocide, through the unwillingness of the Ottoman government to co-operate presented major problems. The British attempt to try the 67 accused perpetrators in Malta was hampered by the lack of evidence as the Sublime Porte refused to allow access to its archives. Under the terms of the Treaty of Lausanne in 1923, a blanket amnesty was issued for all those involved in the Armenian genocide, a term inserted by the Turkish delegation.

However, the example set by the declaration led the Polish government-in-exile starting in January 1940 to press for a similar declaration. Through the British were opposed, but both Charles Corbin, the French ambassador in London and Count Edward Bernard Raczyński, the Polish ambassador in London, were able to work with British officials to issue a declaration on 18 April 1940 that the three powers "hold the German government responsible for these crimes and they affirm their determination to right the wrongs inflicted on the Polish people" as the declaration accused the Reich of "brutal attacks upon the civilian population of Poland in defiance of the accepted principles of international law", of "a policy deliberately aiming at the destruction of the Polish nation" and mentioned the "atrocious treatment" inflicted on the Jewish community of Poland.

== Sources ==
- Chorbajian, Levon (2016). "'They Brought It on Themselves and It Never Happened': Denial to 1939". The Armenian Genocide Legacy. Palgrave Macmillan UK. pp. 167–182. ISBN 978-1-137-56163-3.
- Dadrian, Vahakn N.; Akçam, Taner (2011). Judgment At Istanbul: The Armenian Genocide Trials. Berghahn Books. ISBN 978-0-85745-286-3.
- Dubler, Robert; Kalyk, Matthew (2018). Crimes Against Humanity in the 21st Century Law, Practice and Threats to International Peace and Security. Amsterdam: Brill. ISBN 9789004347687.
- Gaunt, David (2006). Massacres, Resistance, Protectors: Muslim-Christian Relations in Eastern Anatolia During World War I. Gorgias Press. ISBN 978-1-59333-301-0.
- Kochavi, Arieh J. (1998). Prelude to Nuremberg Allied War Crimes Policy and the Question of Punishment. Raleigh: University of North Carolina Press. ISBN 9780807866870.
- Lattanzi, Flavia (2018). "The Armenian Massacres as the Murder of a Nation?". In Emanuela Pistoia & Flavia Lattanzi (ed.). The Armenian Massacres of 1915–1916 a Hundred Years Later Open Questions and Tentative Answers in International Law. New York: Springer. pp. 27–104. ISBN 9783319781693.
- Matiossian, Vartan (2021). The Politics of Naming the Armenian Genocide Language, History and 'Medz Yeghern'. London: Bloomsbury Publishing. ISBN 9780755641093.
- Suny, Ronald Grigor (2015). "They Can Live in the Desert but Nowhere Else": A History of the Armenian Genocide. Princeton University Press. ISBN 978-1-4008-6558-1.
- Lay summary in: Ronald Grigor Suny (26 May 2015). "Armenian Genocide". 1914-1918-online. International Encyclopedia of the First World War.
- Üngör, Uğur Ümit (2008). "Seeing like a nation-state: Young Turk social engineering in Eastern Turkey, 1913–50". Journal of Genocide Research. 10 (1): 15–39. doi:10.1080/14623520701850278. S2CID 71551858.
- Akçam, Taner (2006). A Shameful Act: The Armenian Genocide and the Question of Turkish Responsibility. London: Picador. ISBN 080508665X.
