= Crimes against humanity =

Concept in international law

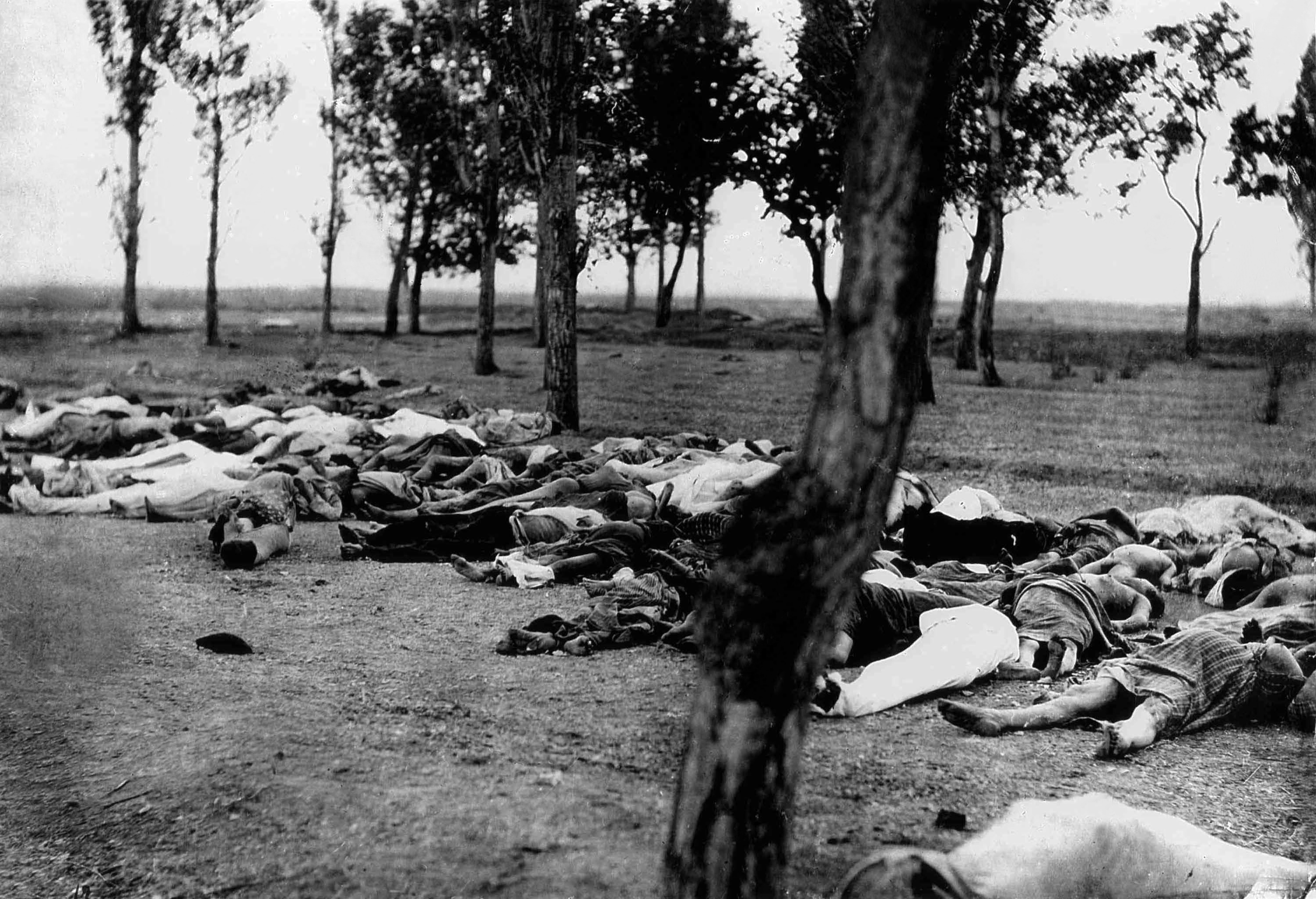
In 1915, the Armenian genocide (pictured) was officially condemned as a "crime against humanity" by Russia, France, and the United Kingdom.

Crimes against humanity are certain crimes committed as part of a large-scale attack against civilians. Unlike war crimes, crimes against humanity can be committed during both peace and war and against a state's own nationals as well as foreign nationals. Together with war crimes, genocide, and the crime of aggression, crimes against humanity are one of the core crimes of international criminal law and, like other crimes against international law, have no temporal or jurisdictional limitations on prosecution (where universal jurisdiction is recognized).

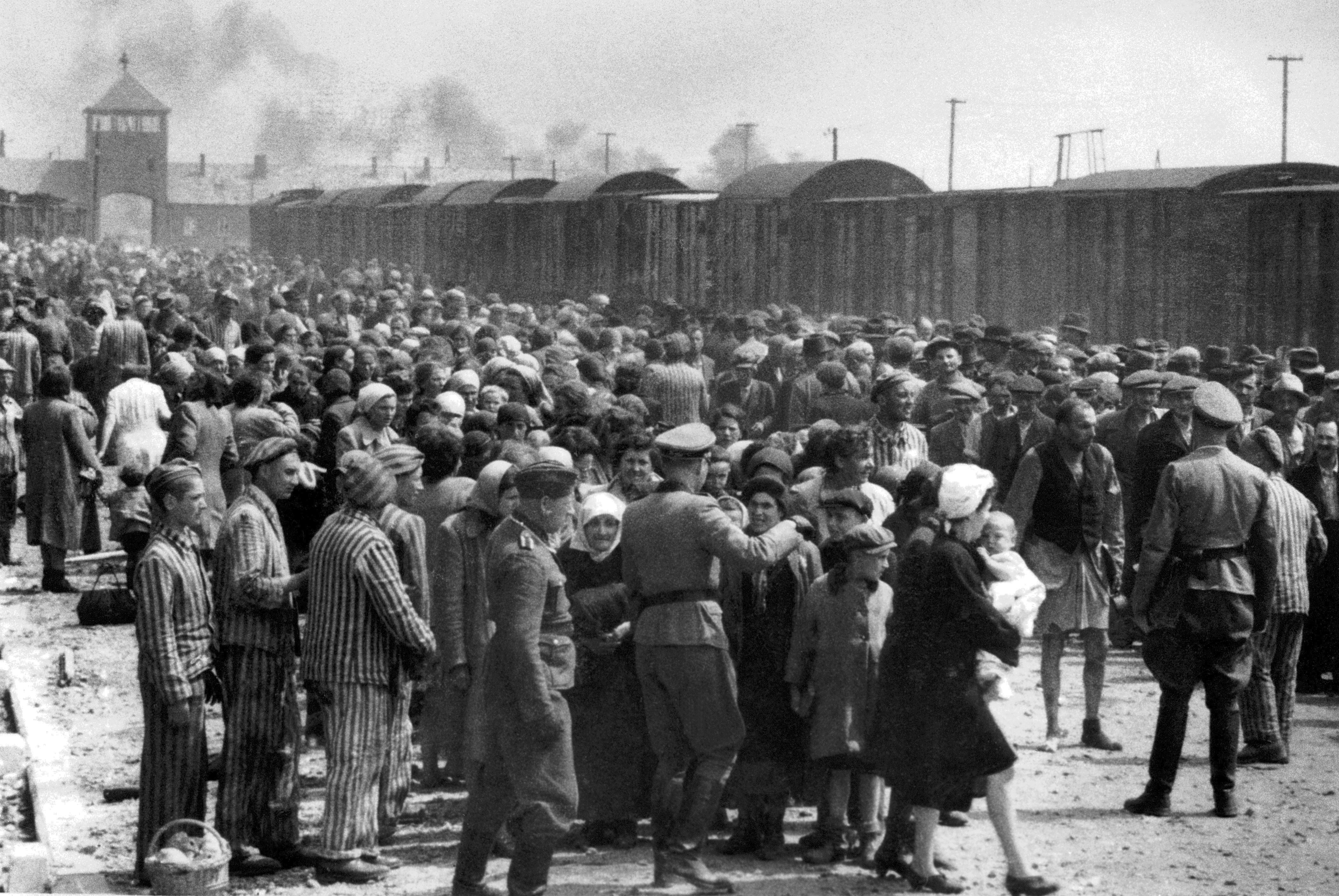
Selection of Hungarian Jews at Auschwitz-II-Birkenau in German-occupied Poland during the final phase of the Holocaust

The first prosecution for crimes against humanity took place during the Nuremberg trials and subsequent Nuremberg trials against defeated leaders of Nazi Germany and collaborators. Crimes against humanity have been prosecuted by other international courts (such as the International Criminal Tribunal for the former Yugoslavia, the International Criminal Tribunal for Rwanda, the Special Court for Sierra Leone, the Extraordinary Chambers in the Courts of Cambodia, and the International Criminal Court) as well as by domestic courts. The law of crimes against humanity has primarily been developed as a result of the evolution of customary international law. Crimes against humanity are not codified in an international convention, so an international effort to establish such a treaty, led by the Crimes Against Humanity Initiative, has been underway since 2008.

According to the Rome Statute, there are eleven types of crimes that can be charged as a crime against humanity when "committed as part of a widespread or systematic attack directed against any civilian population": "murder; extermination; enslavement; deportation or forcible transfer of population; imprisonment or other severe deprivation of physical liberty in violation of fundamental rules of international law; torture; rape, sexual slavery, enforced prostitution, forced pregnancy, forced abortion, enforced sterilization, or any other form of sexual violence of comparable gravity; persecution against any identifiable group or collectivity...; enforced disappearance...; the crime of apartheid; other inhumane acts of a similar character intentionally causing great suffering, or serious injury to body or to mental or physical health."

== Origins of the term ==
The term "crimes against humanity" may cover one or both meanings of the word "humanity": the quality of being human and humans as a whole. In the context of the Nuremberg trials, documents suggest the former sense was primarily intended, being parallel to the concept of "crimes against peace", although scholars have also noted that the second meaning was sometimes present as well.

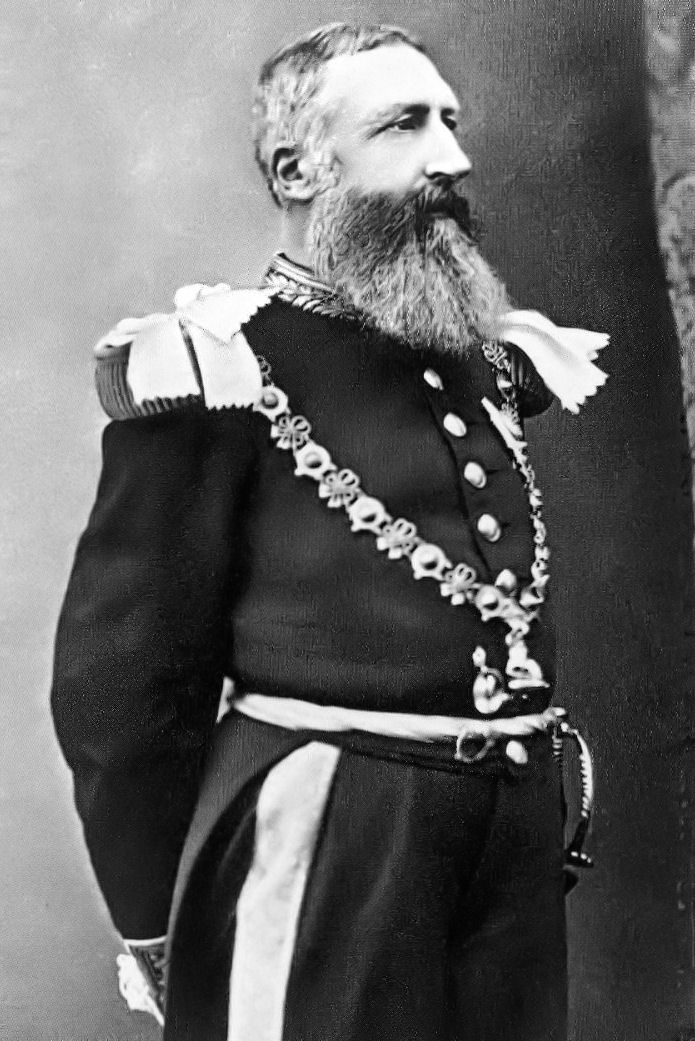
Leopold II, King of the Belgians and de facto owner of the Congo Free State, whose agents were accused of crimes against humanity

The term is first attested in 1883, when American minister, politician and historian George Washington Williams used it in his reflections about slavery in the United States. In his first annual message in December 1889, U.S. President Benjamin Harrison also spoke about the slave trade in Africa as a "crime against humanity". The term "crimes against humanity" was used again by Williams in a letter he wrote to the United States Secretary of State describing the atrocities in the Congo Free State committed by Leopold II of Belgium's administration in 1890. This is often popularly cited as the first use of the term in its modern sense in the English language, despite Williams' earlier usage.

In treaty law, the term was first used in the Second Hague Convention of 1899 preamble and was expanded in the Fourth Hague Convention of 1907 preamble and their respective regulations, which were concerned with the codification of new rules of international humanitarian law. The preamble of the two Conventions referenced the "laws of humanity" as an expression of underlying, unarticulated humanistic values. The term is part of what is known as the Martens Clause.

On 24 May 1915, the Allied Powers, Britain, France, and Russia, jointly issued a statement explicitly and for the first time ever charging another government with committing "a crime against humanity". An excerpt from this joint statement reads:

In view of these new crimes of Turkey against humanity and civilization, the Allied Governments announce publicly to the Sublime Porte that they will hold personally responsible for these crimes all members of the Ottoman Government, as well as those of their agents who are implicated in such massacres.

At the conclusion of the war, the Allied Commission of Responsibilities recommended the creation of a tribunal to try "violations of the laws of humanity" because the law of war did not cover atrocities committed by a state against its own nationals or allied persons. The US representative subsequently objected to references to the "law of humanity" as being imprecise and insufficiently developed at that time, so the concept was not pursued.

A UN report in 1948 referred to the usage of the term "crimes against humanity" regarding the Armenian genocide as a precedent to the Nuremberg and Tokyo trials. On 15 May 1948, the Economic and Social Council presented a 384-page report prepared by the United Nations War Crimes Commission (UNWCC), set up in London (October 1943) to collect and collate information on war crimes and war criminals. The report was in compliance with the request by the UN Secretary-General to make arrangements for "the collection and publication of information concerning human rights arising from trials of war criminals, quislings, and traitors, and in particular from the Nuremberg trials and Tokyo Trials." The report had been prepared by members of the Legal Staff of the commission. The report is highly topical regarding the Armenian Genocide, not only because it uses the 1915 events as a historic example but also as a precedent to Articles 6 (c) and 5 (c) of the Nuremberg and Tokyo Charters, and thereby as a precursor to the then newly adopted UN Genocide Convention, differentiating between war crimes and crimes against humanity. By referring to the information collected during WWI and put forward by the 1919 Commission of Responsibilities, the report titled "Information Concerning Human Rights Arising from Trials of War Criminals" used the Armenian case as a vivid example of crimes committed by a state against its own citizens. The report also noted that while the Paris Peace Treaties with Germany, Austria, Hungary and Bulgaria did not include any reference to "laws of humanity", instead basing the charges on violations of "laws and customs of war", the Sèvres Peace Treaty with Turkey did so. In addition to Articles 226–228, concerning customs of war (corresponding to Articles 228–230 of the Treaty of Versailles), the Sèvres Treaty also contained an additional Article 230, in compliance with the Allied ultimatum of 24 May 1915 regarding "crimes against humanity and civilization".

=== Nuremberg trials ===
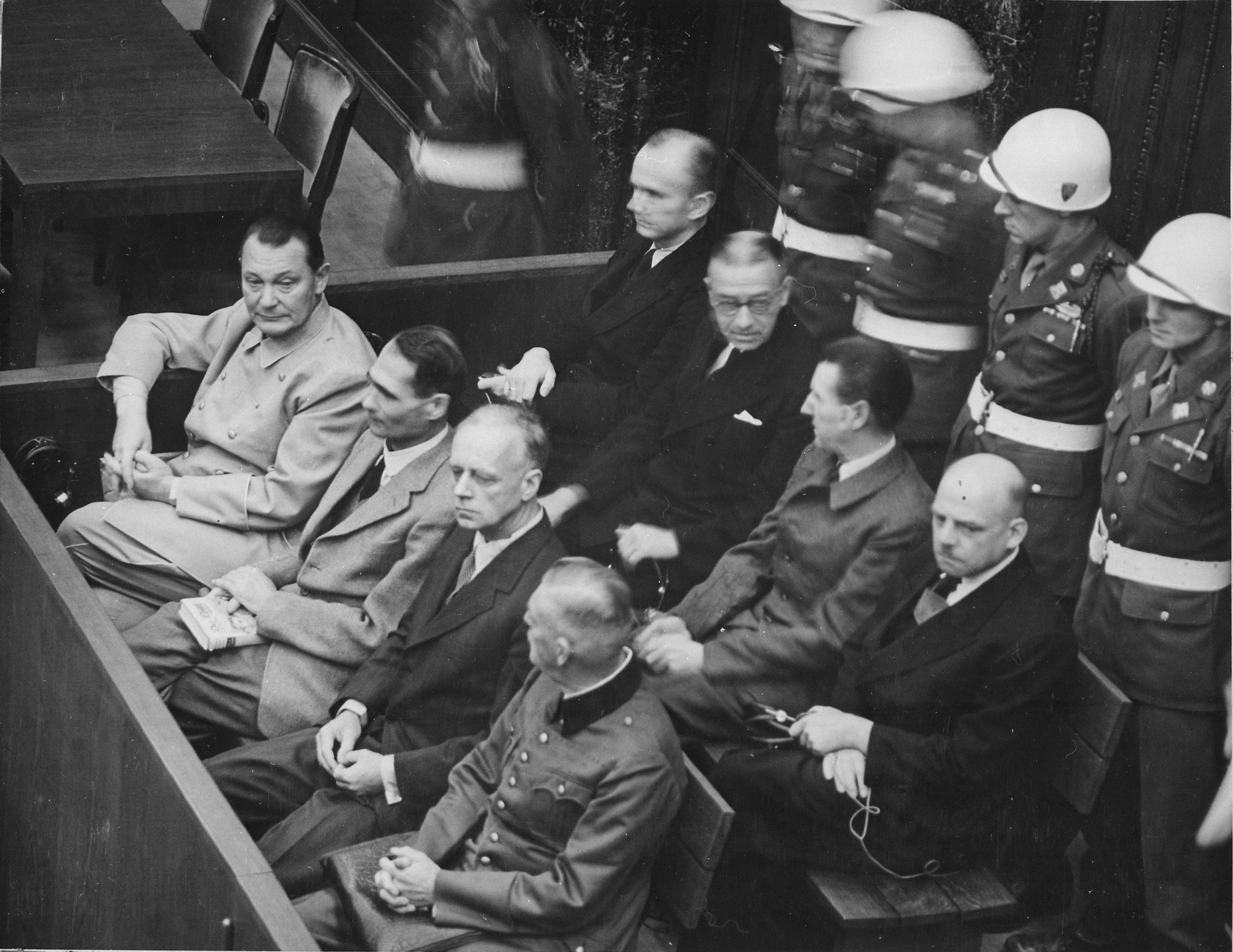
Nuremberg Trials. The defendants are in the dock. The main target of the prosecution was Hermann Göring (at the left edge on the first row of benches), considered to be the most important surviving official in the Third Reich after Hitler's death.

After the Second World War, the Nuremberg Charter set down the laws and procedures by which the Nuremberg trials were to be conducted. The drafters of this document were faced with the problem of how to charge the men at the Nuremberg Trial with committing the Holocaust and other state-sanctioned atrocities committed in Germany and German-allied states by the Nazi regime. As far as German law was concerned, the men had committed no crime but only followed orders. In Nazi Germany, not following orders was a crime punished severely. The problem in trying the individuals responsible for the German atrocities lay in the fact that, like in World War I, a traditional understanding of war crimes gave no provision for atrocities committed by a state on its own citizens or its allies.

To solve this problem and close the loophole, Article 6 of the Charter was drafted to include not only traditional war crimes and crimes against peace, but also crimes against humanity, defined as:

Murder, extermination, enslavement, deportation, and other inhumane acts committed against any civilian population, before or during the war, or persecutions on political, racial or religious grounds in execution of or in connection with any crime within the jurisdiction of the Tribunal, whether or not in violation of the domestic law of the country where perpetrated.

Under this definition, crimes against humanity could be prosecuted and punished, even as ex post facto infractions, only insofar as they could be connected somehow to war crimes or crimes against peace. The jurisdictional limitation was explained by the American chief representative to the London Conference, Robert H. Jackson, who pointed out that it "has been a general principle from time immemorial that the internal affairs of another government are not ordinarily our business". Thus, "it is justifiable that we interfere or attempt to bring retribution to individuals or to states only because the concentration camps and the deportations were in pursuance of a common plan or enterprise of making an unjust war". The judgement of the first Nuremberg trial found that "the policy of persecution, repression and murder of civilians" and persecution of Jews within Germany before the outbreak of war in 1939 were not crimes against humanity, because as "revolting and horrible as many of these crimes were, it has not been satisfactorily proved that they were done in execution of, or in connection with", war crimes or crimes against peace. The subsequent Nuremberg trials were conducted under Control Council Law No. 10 which included a revised definition of crimes against humanity with a wider scope.

=== Tokyo trial ===
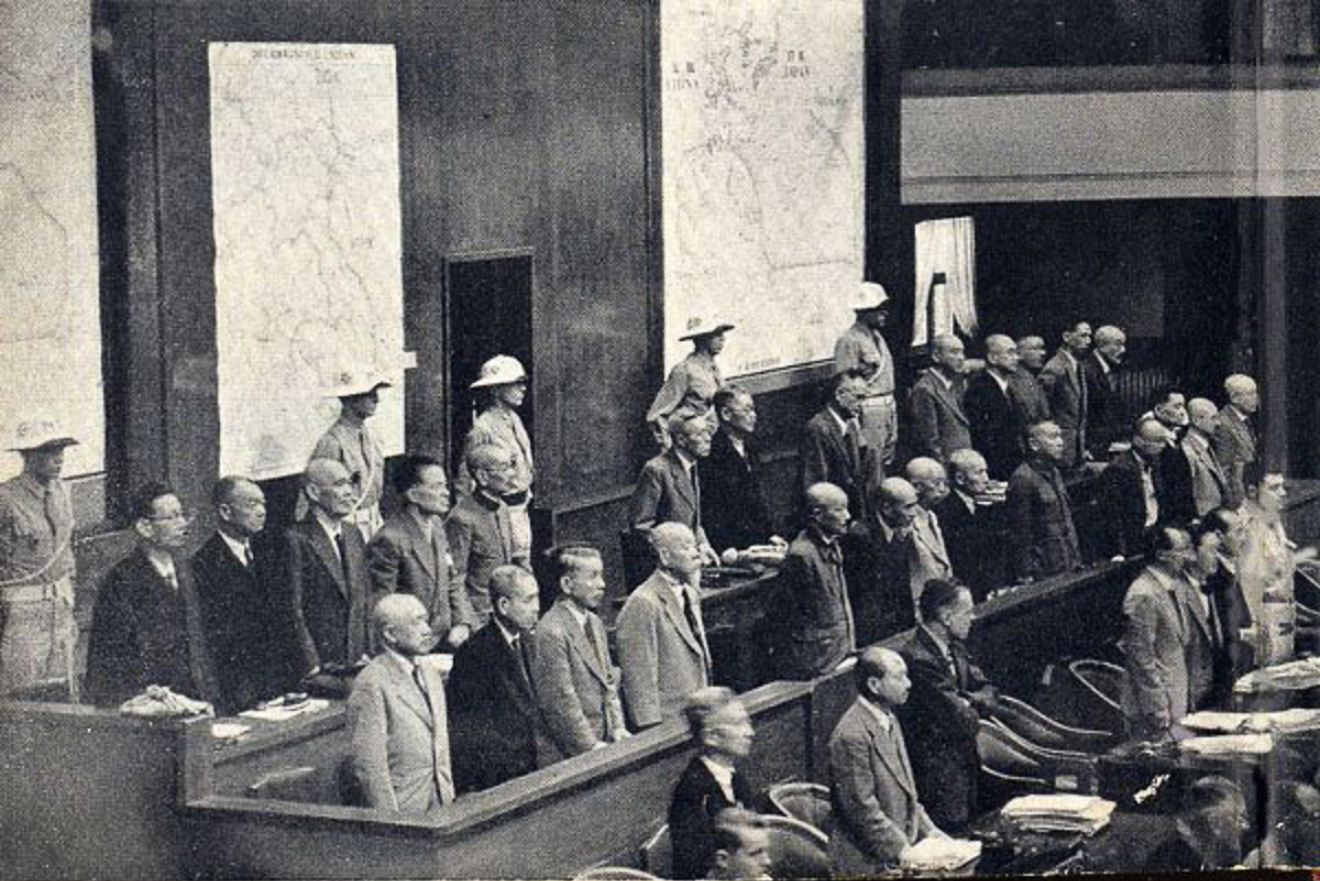
The defendants at the Tokyo International Tribunal. General Hideki Tojo was one of the main defendants and is in the centre of the middle row.

The International Military Tribunal for the Far East (IMTFE), also known as the Tokyo trial, was convened to try the leaders of the Empire of Japan for three types of crimes: "Class A" (crimes against peace), "Class B" (war crimes), and "Class C" (crimes against humanity), committed before and during the Second World War. The legal basis for the trial was established by the Charter of the International Military Tribunal for the Far East (CIMTFE) that was proclaimed on 19 January 1946. The tribunal convened on 3 May 1946, and was adjourned on 12 November 1948.

In the Tokyo Trial, Crimes against Humanity (Class C) was not applied for any suspect. Prosecutions related to the Nanking Massacre were categorised as infringements upon the Laws of War. A panel of eleven judges presided over the IMTFE, one each from victorious Allied powers (United States, Republic of China, Soviet Union, United Kingdom, the Netherlands, Provisional Government of the French Republic, Australia, New Zealand, Canada, British India, and the Philippines).

== Types of crimes against humanity ==
The definition of a crime against humanity varies both between and within countries and it also varies on both the international and domestic levels. Isolated and inhumane acts of a certain nature which are not committed as part of a widespread or systematic attack may constitute grave infringements of human rights, or – depending on the circumstances – war crimes but they are not classified as crimes against humanity.

According to the Rome Statute, there are eleven types of crimes that can be charged as crimes against humanity when they are "committed as part of a widespread or systematic attack directed against any civilian population":

1. Murder;
2. Extermination [including "the intentional infliction of conditions of life, inter alia the deprivation of access to food and medicine, calculated to bring about the destruction of part of a population"];
3. Enslavement;
4. Deportation or forcible transfer of population;
5. Imprisonment or other severe deprivation of physical liberty in violation of fundamental rules of international law;
6. Torture;
7. Rape, sexual slavery, enforced prostitution, forced pregnancy, enforced sterilization, or any other form of sexual violence of comparable gravity;
8. Persecution against any identifiable group or collectivity on political, racial, national, ethnic, cultural, religious, gender as defined in paragraph 3, or other grounds that are universally recognized as impermissible under international law, in connection with any act referred to in this paragraph or any crime within the jurisdiction of the Court;
9. Enforced disappearance of persons;
10. The crime of apartheid;
11. Other inhumane acts of a similar character intentionally causing great suffering, or serious injury to body or to mental or physical health.

=== Apartheid ===
The systematic persecution of members of one racial group by members of another racial group, such as the persecution which was practiced by the South African apartheid government, was recognized as a crime against humanity by the United Nations General Assembly in 1976. The Charter of the United Nations, Articles 13, 14, 15 makes actions of the General Assembly advisory to the Security Council. In regard to apartheid in particular, the UN General Assembly has not made any findings, nor have apartheid-related trials for crimes against humanity been conducted.

=== Rape and sexual violence ===
The Nuremberg and Tokyo Charters did not contain any explicit provisions which recognized sexual and gender-based crimes as war crimes or crimes against humanity, but Control Council Law No. 10 recognized rape as a crime against humanity. The statutes of the International Criminal Tribunal for the former Yugoslavia and the International Criminal Tribunal for Rwanda both included rape as a crime against humanity. The ICC is the first international court which expressly includes various forms of sexual and gender-based crimes – including rape, sexual slavery, enforced prostitution, forced pregnancy, enforced sterilisation, and other forms of sexual violence – as both an underlying act of crimes against humanity and a war crime which is committed during international and/or non-international armed conflicts.

In 2008, the U.N. Security Council adopted resolution 1820, which noted that "rape and other forms of sexual violence can constitute war crimes, crimes against humanity or a constitutive act with respect to genocide".

== Legal status of crimes against humanity in international law ==
Unlike genocide and war crimes, which have been widely recognized and prohibited in international criminal law since the establishment of the Nuremberg principles, there has never been a comprehensive convention on crimes against humanity, even though such crimes are continuously perpetrated worldwide in numerous conflicts and crises. There are eleven international texts defining crimes against humanity, but they all differ slightly as to their definition of that crime and its legal elements. In 2008, the Crimes Against Humanity Initiative was launched to address this gap in international law.

On 30 July 2013, the United Nations International Law Commission voted to include the topic of crimes against humanity in its long-term program of work. In July 2014, the Commission moved this topic to its active programme of work based largely on a report submitted by Sean D. Murphy (the Special Rapporteur for Crimes Against Humanity).

There is some debate on the status of crimes against humanity under customary international law. M. Cherif Bassiouni argues that crimes against humanity are part of jus cogens and as such constitute a non-derogable rule of international law.

== United Nations ==
The United Nations has been primarily responsible for the prosecution of crimes against humanity since it was chartered in 1948.

After Nuremberg and the Tokyo trials, there was no international court with jurisdiction over crimes against humanity for almost 50 years. However, work continued on developing the definition of crimes against humanity at the United Nations. For instance, in 1947, the International Law Commission was charged by the United Nations General Assembly with the formulation of the principles of international law recognized and reinforced in the Nuremberg Charter and judgment, and they were also tasked with drafting a 'code of offenses against the peace and security of mankind'. Completed 50 years later in 1996, the Draft Code defined crimes against humanity as various inhumane acts, i.e., "murder, extermination, torture, enslavement, persecution on political, racial, religious or ethnic grounds, institutionalized discrimination, arbitrary deportation or forcible transfer of population, arbitrary imprisonment, rape, enforced prostitution and other inhuman acts committed in a systematic manner or on a large scale and instigated or directed by a Government or by any organization or group." This definition differs from the one used in Nuremberg, where the criminal acts were to have been committed "before or during the war", thus establishing a nexus between crimes against humanity and armed conflict.

On 21 March 2013, at its 22nd session, the United Nations Human Rights Council established the Commission of Inquiry on human rights in the Democratic People's Republic of Korea (DPRK). The Commission was mandated to investigate the systematic, widespread, and grave violations of human rights in the Democratic People's Republic of Korea (i.e. North Korea), with a view to ensuring full accountability, in particular for violations that may amount to crimes against humanity. The Commission dealt with matters relating to crimes against humanity on the basis of definitions set out by customary international criminal law and in the Rome Statute of the International Criminal Court. The 2014 Report by the Commission found "the body of testimony and other information it received establishes that crimes against humanity have been committed in the Democratic People's Republic of Korea, pursuant to policies established at the highest level of the State [....] These crimes against humanity entail extermination, murder, enslavement, torture, imprisonment, rape, forced abortions and other sexual violence, persecution on political, religious, racial and gender grounds, the forcible transfer of populations, the enforced disappearance of persons and the inhumane act of knowingly causing prolonged starvation. The Commission further finds that crimes against humanity are ongoing in the Democratic People's Republic of Korea because the policies, institutions and patterns of impunity that lie at their heart remain in place." Additionally, the Commission found that crimes against humanity have been committed against starving populations, particularly during the 1990s and that they were still being committed against persons from other countries who were systematically abducted or denied repatriation because they sought to gain labour and other skills for the Democratic People's Republic of Korea.

In mid-October 2026, in the context of United Nations coordinated negotiations towards creating a formal convention on crimes against humanity, the Coalition for a Crimes against Humanity Convention, a coalition of individual experts and non-governmental organizations, called for practical access to the negotiations by civil society organisations, including "the opportunity to submit requests to participate in the Conference in a timely manner" and "full rights of participation, including to attend and effectively address all formal meetings, and to receive and submit materials".

=== Security Council ===
UN Security Council Resolution 1674, adopted by the United Nations Security Council on 28 April 2006, "reaffirms the provisions of paragraphs 138 and 139 of the 2005 World Summit Outcome Document regarding the responsibility to protect populations from genocide, war crimes, ethnic cleansing and crimes against humanity". The resolution commits the Council to action to protect civilians in armed conflict. In 2008 the UN Security Council adopted resolution 1820, which noted that "rape and other forms of sexual violence can constitute war crimes, crimes against humanity or a constitutive act with respect to genocide".

According to the United Nations Security Council resolution 1970 (2011) concerning Libya, any direct or indirect trade of arms to the Libyan Arab Jamahiriya, in the form of supply, transfer, or sale should be prevented by the member nations. The arms embargo restricts the supply of arms, weapons, military vehicles, spare parts, technical assistance, finances, and the provision of armed mercenaries with origins of a country other than the one providing. Later, the United Nations claimed in its November 2019 report that the United Arab Emirates, Jordan and Turkey were then violating the arms embargo imposed on Libya under the 1970 resolution. An airstrike on the migrant detention center in Tripoli in July 2019, believed to have been carried out by the United Arab Emirates, can be amounted as a war crime, as stated by the United Nations. The airstrike was deadlier than the 2011 militarized uprising that overthrew the regime of Muammar Gaddafi.

== International courts and criminal tribunals ==
After the Nuremberg and Tokyo trials of 1945–1946, another international tribunal with jurisdiction over crimes against humanity was not established for another five decades. In response to atrocities committed in the 1990s, multiple ad hoc tribunals were established with jurisdiction over crimes against humanity. The statutes of the International Criminal Court, the International Criminal Tribunals for the Former Yugoslavia and for Rwanda each contain different definitions of crimes against humanity.

=== International Criminal Tribunal for Yugoslavia ===
In 1993, the UN Security Council established the International Criminal Tribunal for the former Yugoslavia (ICTY), with jurisdiction to investigate and prosecute three international crimes which had taken place in the former Yugoslavia: genocide, war crimes, and crimes against humanity. Article 5 of the ICTY Statute states that:

"The International Tribunal shall have the power to prosecute persons responsible for the following crimes when committed in armed conflict, whether international or internal in character, and directed against any civilian population:

"(a) murder;
(b) extermination;
(c) enslavement;
(d) deportation;
(e) imprisonment;
(f) torture;
(g) rape;
(h) persecutions on political, racial and religious grounds;
(i) other inhumane acts."

This definition of crimes against humanity revived the original 'Nuremberg' nexus with armed conflict, connecting crimes against humanity to both international and non-international armed conflict. It also expanded the list of criminal acts used in Nuremberg to include imprisonment, torture and rape. Cherif Bassiouni has argued that this definition was necessary as the conflict in the former Yugoslavia was considered to be a conflict of both an international and non-international nature. Therefore, this adjusted definition of crimes against humanity was necessary to afford the tribunal jurisdiction over this crime.

=== International Criminal Tribunal for Rwanda ===
The UN Security Council established the International Criminal Tribunal for Rwanda in 1994 following the Rwandan genocide. Under the ICTR Statute, the link between crimes against humanity and an armed conflict of any kind was dropped. Rather, the requirement was added that the inhumane acts must be part of a "systematic or widespread attack against any civilian population on national, political, ethnic, racial or religious grounds." Unlike the conflict in the former Yugoslavia, the conflict in Rwanda was deemed to be non-international, so crimes against humanity would likely not have been applicable if the nexus to armed conflict had been maintained.

=== International Criminal Court ===
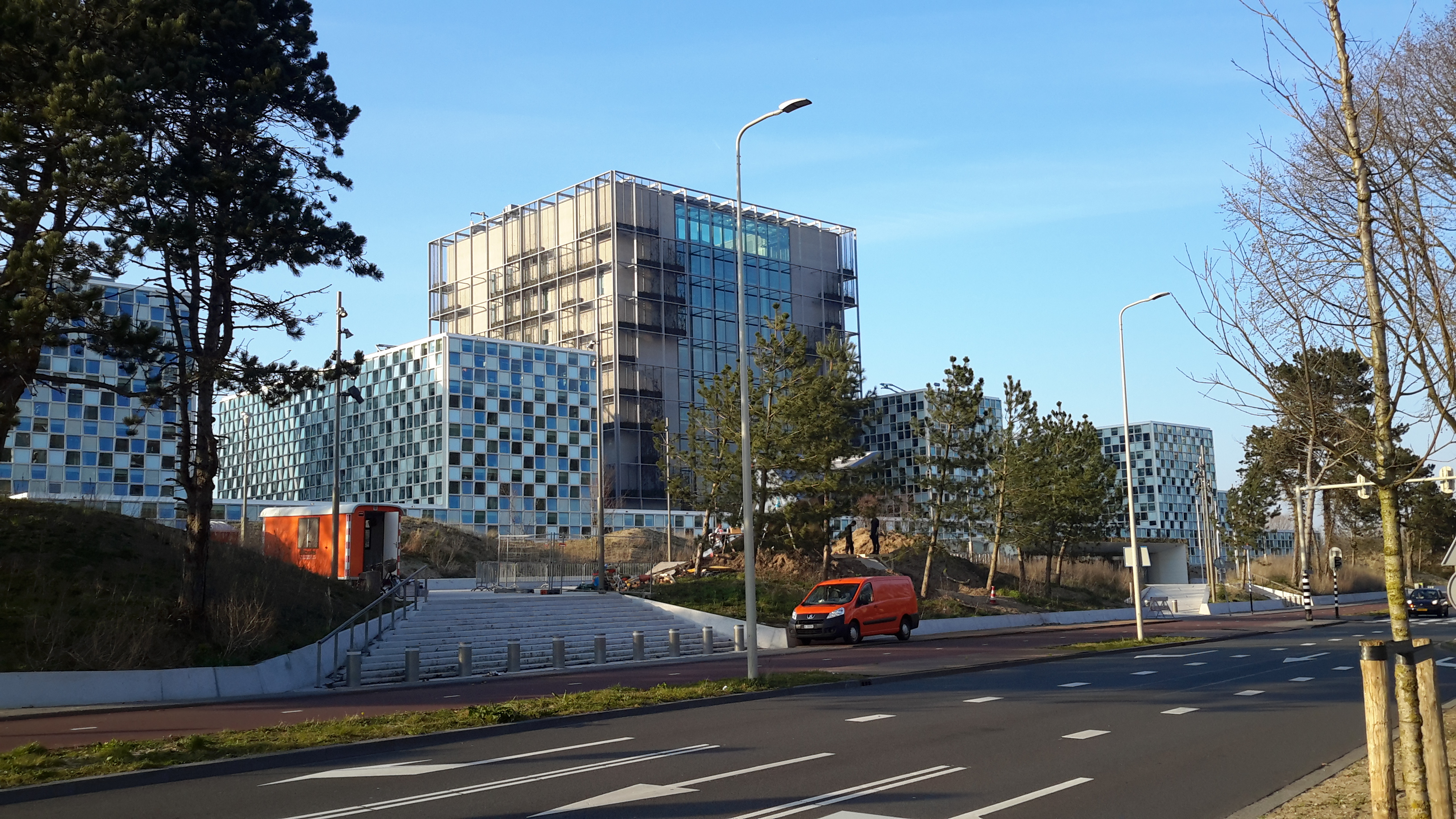
Headquarters of the ICC in The Hague

In 2002, the International Criminal Court (ICC) was established in The Hague (Netherlands), and the Rome Statute provides for the ICC to have jurisdiction over genocide, crimes against humanity, and war crimes. ICC proceedings definitions of a "crime against humanity" have evolved significantly from its original legal definition or that used by the UN. Essentially, the Rome Statute employs the same definition of crimes against humanity that the ICTR Statute does, minus the requirement that the attack was carried out 'on national, political, ethnic, racial or religious grounds'. In addition, the Rome Statute definition offers the most expansive list of specific criminal acts that may constitute crimes against humanity to date.

The Rome Statute Explanatory Memorandum states that crimes against humanity:

are particularly odious offenses in that they constitute a serious attack on human dignity or grave humiliation or a degradation of one or more human beings. They are not isolated or sporadic events, but are part either of a government policy (although the perpetrators need not identify themselves with this policy) or of a wide practice of atrocities tolerated or condoned by a government or a de facto authority. However, murder, extermination, torture, rape, political, racial, or religious persecution and other inhumane acts reach the threshold of crimes against humanity only if they are part of a widespread or systematic practice. Isolated inhumane acts of this nature may constitute grave infringements of human rights, or depending on the circumstances, war crimes, but may fall short of meriting the stigma attaching to the category of crimes under discussion. On the other hand, an individual may be guilty of crimes against humanity even if he perpetrates one or two of the offences mentioned above, or engages in one such offense against only a few civilians, provided those offenses are part of a consistent pattern of misbehavior by a number of persons linked to that offender (for example, because they engage in armed action on the same side or because they are parties to a common plan or for any similar reason.) Consequently when one or more individuals are not accused of planning or carrying out a policy of inhumanity, but simply of perpetrating specific atrocities or vicious acts, in order to determine whether the necessary threshold is met one should use the following test: one ought to look at these atrocities or acts in their context and verify whether they may be regarded as part of an overall policy or a consistent pattern of an inhumanity, or whether they instead constitute isolated or sporadic acts of cruelty and wickedness.

To fall under the Rome Statute, a crime against humanity which is defined in Article 7.1 must be "part of a widespread or systematic attack directed against any civilian population". Article 7.2.a states "For the purpose of paragraph 1: 'Attack directed against any civilian population means a course of conduct involving the multiple commission of acts referred to in paragraph 1 against any civilian population, pursuant to or in furtherance of a State or organizational policy to commit such attack'." This means that an individual crime on its own, or even a number of such crimes, would not fall under the Rome Statute unless they were the result of a state policy or an organizational policy. This was confirmed by Luis Moreno Ocampo in an open letter publishing his conclusions about allegations of crimes committed during the invasion of Iraq in March 2003 which might fall under the ICC. In a section entitled "Allegations concerning Genocide and Crimes against Humanity," Ocampo states that "the available information provided no reasonable indicator of the required elements for a crime against humanity," i.e., 'a widespread or systematic attack directed against any civilian population'".

The ICC can only prosecute crimes against humanity in situations under which it has jurisdiction. The ICC only has jurisdiction over crimes contained in its statute – genocide, war crimes and crimes against humanity – which have been committed on the territory of a State party to the Rome Statute, when a non-party State refers a situation within its country to the court, or when the United Nation Security Council refers a case to the ICC. In 2005 the UN referred to the ICC the situation in Darfur. This referral resulted in an indictment of Sudanese President Omar al-Bashir for genocide, crimes against humanity, and war crimes in 2008. When the ICC President reported to the UN regarding its progress handling these crimes against humanity case, Judge Phillipe Kirsch said "The Court does not have the power to arrest these persons. That is the responsibility of States and other actors. Without arrests, there can be no trials."

== Council of Europe ==
The Committee of Ministers of the Council of Europe on 30 April 2002 issued a recommendation to the member states, on the protection of women against violence. In the section "Additional measures concerning violence in conflict and post-conflict situations", states in paragraph 69 that member states should: "penalize rape, sexual slavery, forced pregnancy, enforced sterilization or any other form of sexual violence of comparable gravity as an intolerable violation of human rights, as crimes against humanity and, when committed in the context of an armed conflict, as war crimes;"

In the Explanatory Memorandum on this recommendation when considering paragraph 69:

Reference should be made to the Statute of the International Criminal Tribunal adopted in Rome in July 1998. Article 7 of the Statute defines rape, sexual slavery, enforced prostitution, forced pregnancy, enforced sterilization or any other form of sexual violence of comparable gravity, as crimes against humanity. Furthermore, Article 8 of the Statute defines rape, sexual slavery, enforced prostitution, forced pregnancy, enforced sterilization or any other form of sexual violence as a serious breach of the Geneva Conventions and as war crimes.

== 20th century ==
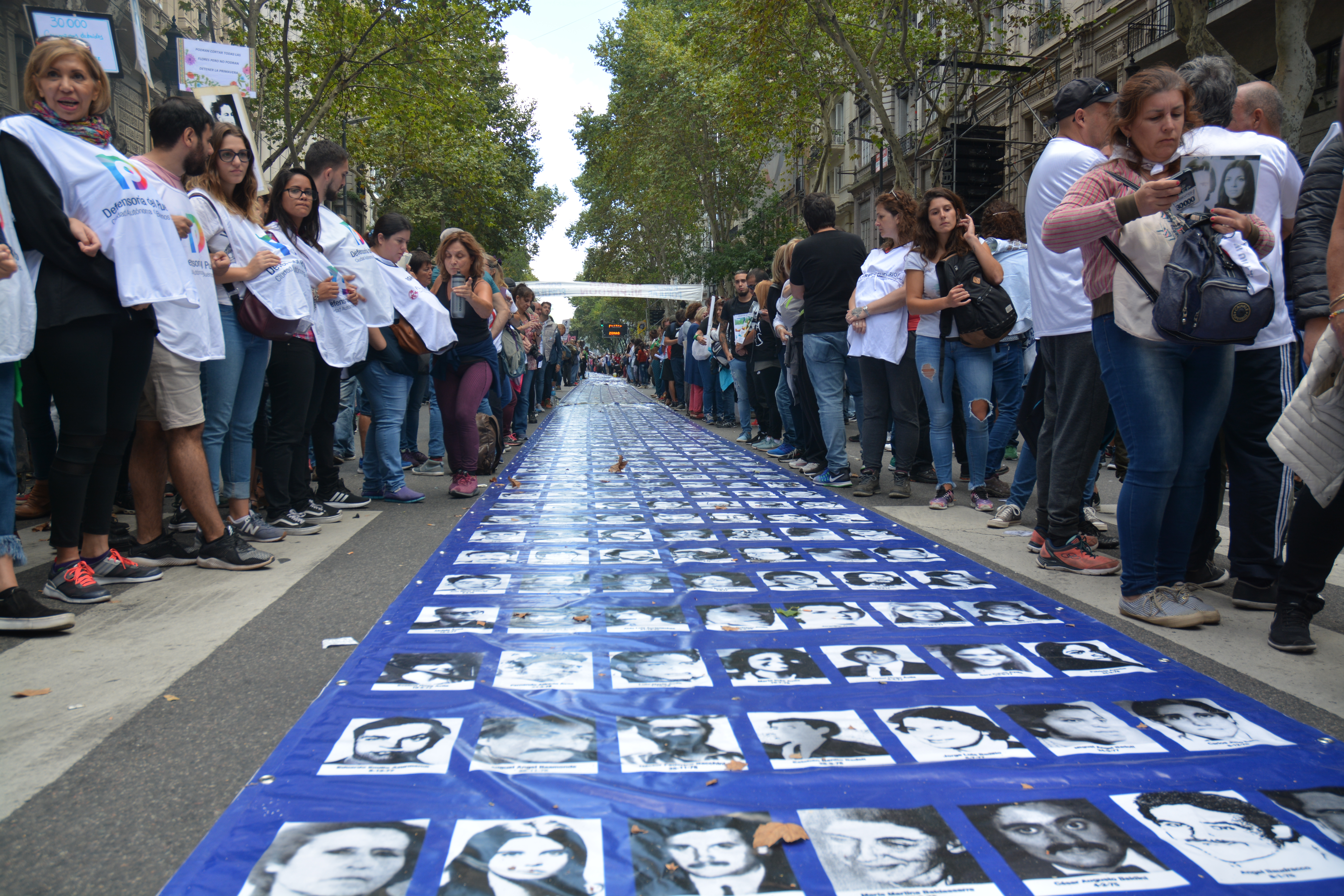
Argentines commemorate victims of military junta, 24 March 2019

Numerous sources cite the 20th century as the bloodiest century in global history. Millions of civilian infants, children, adults, and elderly people died in warfare. One civilian perished for every combatant killed. Prior to World War II, war criminals did not face the possibility of prosecution, apprehension, or imprisonment. Britain's Prime Minister Winston Churchill favored the outright execution of war criminals. The United States was more lenient and called for a just trial. The British Government was convinced to institute the Nuremberg Trials, which left several legacies. These include worldwide jurisdiction for severe war crimes, the creation of international war crime tribunals, judicial procedures that effectively documented the history of colossal crimes, and the success of UN courts in holding impartial trials.

South Africa operated under apartheid system from 1948 into the 1990s in violation of the 1973 Apartheid convention, which declared apartheid to be a crime against humanity. Following international action and backlash, the apartheid system was dismantled at the end of the 20th century.

The UN highlighted the Rome Statute of the International Criminal Court (ICC), specifically Article 7 (Crimes against Humanity), which defines large-scale acts of violence against a locality's civilian populace. These acts include murder, extermination, enslavement, deportation or forcible transfer of the population, imprisonment or other severe deprivation of physical liberty in violation of international laws, torture, forced prostitution and rape, persecution against certain groups, apartheid (racial discrimination and segregation), and other inhumane acts. A publication from Trial International mentioned that crimes against humanity have been codified starting in 1990. These include the 1993 Statute of the International Criminal Tribunal for Yugoslavia, the 1994 Statute of the International Tribunal for Rwanda, and the 1998 Rome Statute of the International Criminal Court. The latter contains the latest and most extensive list of detailed crimes against civilians.

== 21st century ==
A report on the 2008–09 Gaza War by Richard Goldstone accused Israeli and Hamas forces of possibly committing a crime against humanity. The report concluded that Israel had used disproportionate force, targeted Palestinian civilians, used them as human shields, and destroyed civilian infrastructure. Hamas was found to have deliberately targeted Israeli civilians and Israeli infrastructure by mounting indiscriminate rocket attacks. Both the Israeli government and Hamas dismissed the findings of the report. Writing in The Washington Post two years later, Goldstone questioned the report's findings on Israel's intentional targeting of civilians.

In 2019, United Nations investigators announced that Israeli troops may have committed crimes against humanity. During the Gaza protests, 189 Palestinians were killed, investigators said, 183 were shot with live ammunition, including 35 children, three health workers, and two journalists.

In 2022, the UN Human Rights Office assessment of human rights concerns in Xinjiang concluded that the extent of arbitrary and discriminatory detention of members of Uyghur and other predominantly Muslim groups in China, since 2017, pursuant to law and policy, in context of restrictions and deprivation more generally of fundamental rights enjoyed individually and collectively, may constitute international crimes, in particular crimes against humanity. Amnesty International accused Israel of committing the crime of apartheid against Palestinians.

The Myanmar military's targeting of the Rohingya Muslims in which more than 25,000 have been killed and more than 18,000 women and girls have been systematically raped have been labelled as crimes against humanity by United Nations and Amnesty International. OHCHR Independent Fact-Finding Mission have found Tatmadaw of committing crimes against humanity, genocide, and ethnic cleansing.

A report of a UN fact-finding mission, which was released in March 2024 and presided over by Sara Hossain, revealed that the Iranian regime engaged in systematic and egregious institutionalized crimes against humanity on a large scale. Between 2021 and 2022, 551 protestors were killed during the Woman, Life, Freedom movement, and 834 people were executed in 2023.

The International Court of Justice, Amnesty International, Human Rights Watch, Euro-Med Human Rights Monitor, and Michael Lynk (UN Special Rapporteur for the Palestinian occupied territory) have accused Israel of committing apartheid against Palestinians in the Israeli-occupied West Bank. Along with the apartheid system, Israel is also implicated in what many legal scholars say are crimes against humanity in the Gaza genocide. Human Rights Watch found that Israeli authorities systematically deprived Palestinian civilians in Gaza of water, food, and medical supplies, leading to widespread deaths and suffering, all acts of genocide. The International Criminal Court issued arrest warrants for Israeli Prime Minister Benjamin Netanyahu and former Defense Minister Yoav Gallant, citing war crimes and crimes against humanity, with a particular focus on Israel's deliberate starvation of civilians as a weapon of war.

In April 2024, the United Nations Human Rights Council (UNHRC) adopted a resolution calling for Israel to be held accountable for possible war crimes and crimes against humanity in the Gaza Strip, and demanding a halt to all arms sales to the country. 28 countries voted in favor, 13 abstained, and six voted against. Israel's ambassador accused the UN of anti-Israeli bias.

The United Arab Emirates (UAE) has faced significant international scrutiny for its crimes against humanity in the ongoing Sudanese conflict, particularly concerning support for the Rapid Support Forces (RSF). Reports indicate that the UAE has been a key supplier of military equipment to the RSF, including weapons and drones, which have been used in operations leading to widespread atrocities in regions like Darfur. Investigations have uncovered evidence suggesting that the UAE violated the United Nations arms embargo on Darfur by providing arms and ammunition to the RSF. This support has allegedly fueled the RSF's campaign of violence, contributing to the ongoing humanitarian crisis in Sudan.

Within the Sudanese conflict, the Sudanese Armed Forces have also perpetrated numerous crimes against humanity, according to NGOs. Human Rights Watch reported that SAF airstrikes targeted mosques, markets, and residential areas. CNN found that the Sudanese Armed Forces engaged in ethnic violence and mass killings, particularly in Sudan's Jazira state.

In early 2025, former Philippine president Rodrigo Duterte was arrested after an ICC warrant due to extrajudicial killings done during his war on drugs, which are alleged to be crimes against humanity. The killings during his presidency were allegedly done or aided by Philippine National Police generals, particularly former PNP chief now Senator Ronald "Bato" dela Rosa.

In January 2026, Mai Sato (Special Rapporteur on human rights in Iran) called for an independent investigation to determine whether the Iranian government's suppression of nationwide protests constitutes crimes against humanity.

In the Russo-Ukrainian war (2022–present), the Independent International Commission of Inquiry on Ukraine reported that Russia targets civilians in the Kherson area and has abducted children from Ukraine to Russia, both of which were considered crimes against humanity.
