= Tasuku Okada =

Japanese officer (1890–1949)

- 岡田 資
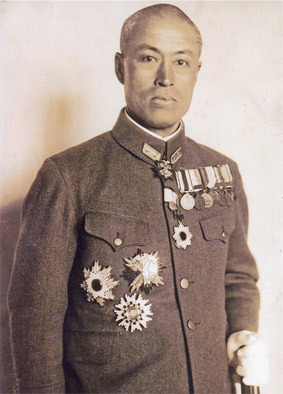
- Born: April 14, 1890; Tottori Prefecture, Imperial Japan
- Died: September 17, 1949 (aged 59); Sugamo Prison, Occupied Japan
- Status: Executed by hanging
- Conviction: War crimes
- Trial: Yokohama War Crimes Trials
- Penalty: Death
- Military career
- Allegiance: Empire of Japan
- Branch: Imperial Japanese Army
- Service years: 1911–1945
- Rank: Lieutenant General
- Conflicts: World War II

Tasuku Okada (岡田 資, Okada Tasuku; April 14, 1890 – September 17, 1949) was a Japanese officer during World War II. After the war he was put on trial during the Yokohama War Crimes Trials for ordering executions of captured American aircrew in 1945. Okada was found guilty, sentenced to death, and hanged in 1949. Okada took responsibility for ordering the execution of 38 captured U.S. POWs, after he considered them to be war criminals for the firebombings of Japan.

== In popular culture ==
The war crimes trial of Okada was depicted in the 2007 film, Best Wishes for Tomorrow. He was played by Makoto Fujita.
