= Robert Lesser =

American actor

Robert Lesser or Bobby Lesser is an American film, theater and television actor.

Lesser was born in New York City, and lives in Santa Barbara. His earliest work dates to 1967 with "David Holzman's Diary", directed by Jim McBride. He is best known for the opening scene with Bruce Willis in Die Hard, his featured role in Hester Street with Carol Kane, The Big Easy, Oscar with Sylvester Stallone, Shoot to Kill with Sidney Poitier, The Presidio (film) starring Sean Connery, the Japanese film Best Wishes for Tomorrow, among others. Lesser has worked with Bruce Willis, Ed Harris, Alan Arkin, Arnold Schwarzenegger, Matthew Broderick, Dennis Quaid, Penelope Ann Miller, and Richard Mulligan. He is well known in the Santa Barbara theater community.

In 2011, both The Wall Street Journal and The Hollywood Reporter published a front page, tongue-in-cheek open letter from Lesser to the Internet Movie Database after they refused to correct his birthdate, which they had listed as May 28, 1938, aging him considerably. They have since corrected the date.

== Selected theaters ==
- The New York Shakespeare Festival's Richard the Third, on Broadway
- The Soft Touch directed by Alan Arkin
- Rubbers and Yanks 3 Detroit 0 Top of the Seventh, American Place Theatre by Alan Arkin.
- Performances at the Yale Repertory's Winterfest
- Geography of a Horse Dreamer by Sam Shepard - The Manhattan Theatre Club.
- Steven Berkoff's Kvetch and God's Country - Odyssey Theatre, Los Angeles.
- To Gillian on Her 37th Birthday by Michael Pressman (West Coast premiere).
- Santa Barbara area:

Rubicon Theatre: My Antonia, In All Honesty
Center Stage Theatre: The Goat or Who is Sylvia by Edward Albee and Krapp's Last Tape by Samuel Beckett.
Ensemble Theatre Company: The Fourth Wall, Communicating Doors, The Last Night of Ballyhoo, The Weir, An Inspector Calls, and The Cripple of Inishmaan.

== Selected films ==
| Year | Title | Role | Notes |
|---|---|---|---|
| 1967 | David Holzman's Diary | Max, Penny's agent | |
| 1974 | Hot Times | Coach / Guru | |
| 1975 | Hester Street | Lawyer | |
| 1977 | The Goodbye Girl | Richard III Cast | |
| 1980 | Christmas Evil | Detective Gottleib | |
| 1981 | The Gangster Chronicles | Treasury Agent #1 | |
| 1984 | 2010 | Dr. Hirsch | |
| 1986 | Poltergeist II: The Other Side | Kane's People | |
| 1986 | Running Scared | Supoena Lawyer | |
| 1986 | The Big Easy | 'Silky' Foster | |
| 1987 | The Monster Squad | Eugene's Dad | |
| 1988 | Shoot to Kill | Minelli | |
| 1988 | The Presidio | Sgt. Mueller | |
| 1988 | Die Hard | Businessman | |
| 1988 | Ernest Saves Christmas | Marty | |
| 1989 | Great Balls of Fire! | Alan Freed | |
| 1991 | Oscar | Officer Keough | |
| 1993 | What's Love Got to Do with It | Fairmount M.C. | |
| 1995 | Across the Moon | Dentist #2 | |
| 1995 | Steal Big Steal Little | Agent Buchanan | |
| 1997 | The Relic | Mayor Robert Owen | |
| 1998 | Godzilla | Murray | |
| 1999 | The Auteur Theory | Abusive Dad - The Quest | |
| 1999 | End of Days | Carson | |
| 2001 | An American Rhapsody | Harold | |
| 2007 | Best Wishes for Tomorrow | Featherstone | title translates to "Ashita e no yuigon" |
| 2009 | Painting in the Rain | Stefan | |
| 2016 | 8989 Redstone | Pavel | |

== Selected television ==
- Charlie's Angels (1981) - Burt Walker
- The New Odd Couple (1982–1983) - Harry Price / Stage Manager
- St. Elsewhere (1987)
- Married... with Children (1991) - Bum - Edwin Johanson
- Herman's Head (1992) - Troy Michaels
- Empty Nest (1990–1995) - Dr. Perry Smith / Russell
- Bosom Buddies (1981)
