= Yokohama War Crimes Trials =

Series of trials of Japanese war criminals

The Yokohama War Crimes Trials were 319 trials of 996 Japanese accused of committing war crimes during World War II, held before the military commission of the U.S. 8th Army at Yokohama between February 1946 and October 1949. The defendants included civilians as well as military personnel ranging from enlisted ranks to generals, they belonged to class B and C, as defined by the charter of the International Military Tribunal for the Far East. Of those tried, 854 defendants were convicted, with 124 of them receiving death sentences, of which 51 were carried out. All of the convicts served their sentences or were executed at Sugamo Prison. In 1958, those still serving prison sentences from the trials were all paroled. These trials accounted for the majority of the 474 American war crimes trials conducted in the Asia-Pacific region.

== Background ==
The majority of the 996 defendants were charged with committing war crimes against Allied prisoners of war (POWs) and civilian internees. During the conflict, Imperial Japan captured a large number of Allied military personnel and civilians across Asia and the Pacific. While some were detained at the sites of their surrender, others were transported to detention facilities within Japan and other occupied territories. Many detainees were subjected to forced labor under harsh conditions intended to support Japan's wartime economy.

Reports and judicial records from the period document widespread mistreatment, including inadequate provision of food, medical care, and shelter. The trials revealed a range of abuses such as physical assaults, torture, mutilation, medical experimentation, and execution by various means including shooting, bayoneting, and beheading. Numerous prison camp commandants and guards were tried. Approximately 90 percent of American POWs who died in Japanese custody perished in prison camps or aboard "hell ships".

Defendants came from a wide range of backgrounds, including professional military personnel across all ranks, ranging from generals to enlisted men, as well as interpreters, agricultural workers, mine foremen, medical professionals such as doctors and nurses, civil servants, Shinto priests, and academics. Several women were also prosecuted, Shigeko Tsutsui for example, was a former army nurse charged for her involvement in "merciless medical experiments" upon captured American airmen.

== Notable defendants ==
Lieutenant General Tasuku Okada: Ordered the summary executions of 38 captured American aircrew. Executed in 1949.

Lieutenant General Takaji Wachi: Convicted of unlawfully transporting troops and munitions on Red Cross ships in the Philippines. Sentenced to 6 years in prison. Paroled in 1950. Died in 1978.

Lieutenant General Masazumi Inada: Convicted of his complicity in the cover-up of the vivisection and other human medical experiments performed at the Kyushu Imperial University on downed Allied airmen. Sentenced to 7 years in prison. Released in 1951. Died in 1986.

Lieutenant General Isamu Yokoyama: Convicted of having direct command responsibility for the vivisection and other human medical experiments performed at the Kyushu Imperial University on downed Allied airmen. Sentenced to death in 1948, but later reprieved. Died in prison in 1952.

Lieutenant General Eitaro Uchiyama: Convicted for his command responsibility over the executions of American airmen shot down between April and August 1945. Sentenced to 30 years of hard labor. Paroled in 1958. Died in 1973.

Lieutenant General Michio Kunitake: Uchiyama's Chief of Staff, convicted for his command responsibility over the executions of American airmen shot down between April and August 1945. Sentenced to 3 years of hard labor.

Lieutenant Generals Tadakazu Wakamatsu, Rimpei Kato, Goro Isoya, Choho Mononobe, Hiroshi Nukada, Bunro Saeki and Colonel Okikatsu Arao: High-ranking staff officers convicted of mistreating over 30,000 Allied prisoners of war by transporting them in "hell ships" under inhumane conditions that caused suffering and death, and or of failing to prevent such abuse by those under their command. Sentenced to hard labor for periods ranging from 1 to 18 years.

Major General Yoshitaka Kawane and Colonel Kurataro Hirano: Convicted of ordering the Bataan Death March. Executed together in 1949.

Captain Kaichi Hirate: Permitted the mistreatment and murder of Allied POWs. Executed in 1946.

== See also ==
- Bataan Death March
- International Military Tribunal for the Far East
- Japanese war crimes
- Khabarovsk war crimes trials
- Nanjing War Crimes Tribunal
- Sugamo Prison
- Unit 731
