= Fred Spiker =

American actor

- Born: 1957 (age 68–69)
- Occupation: Actor
- Years active: 2003–2026

Fred Spiker (formerly known as Fred McQueen) is an actor who bears a striking resemblance to Steve McQueen, whom Spiker claims is his father. Spiker was born while Steve McQueen was married to Manila-born actress Neile Adams and Steve McQueen played no part in the raising of Fred.

== Career ==
Spiker avoided the spotlight for most of his life, doing odd jobs like a firefighter and pastry chef. He didn't start acting until 2003, becoming a moderate success with a large following in Japan. He beat out 200 other actors for the role of prosecutor Burnett in the post World War II Japan drama, Ashita e no Yuigon (Best Wishes for Tomorrow). The controversial movie, Best Wishes for Tomorrow, documents the prosecution of Japanese war criminal Lieutenant General Tasuku Okada, who took responsibility for ordering the execution of 38 captured US prisoners of war, after he considered them to be war criminals instead of prisoner of war after the fire bombing of Nagoya. Not shying away from the role, Spiker did a lot of research about the post-war American military prosecutor and his role in the Okada trial. A fairly new actor, Spiker had some problems with his nerves that made him forget his lines and finding his mark. More recently he played the Secretary General, Bracharz, in the cult hit and one of Japan's most expensive films, 20-seiki shônen: Dai 2 shô - Saigo no kibô (2009) .

In addition to movies, he also starred in a number of commercials for companies including Mitsubishi and Hummer, which is sold by General Motors.

Spiker's claims that he was the son of Steve McQueen were called into question by journalist Barney Brantingham of the Santa Barbara Independent in December 2010. Brantingham found no mention of Spiker in Marshall Terrill's book, "Steve McQueen: The Life and Legend of a Hollywood Icon," and asked the author why. Terrill said the claim had no merit.

"I have serious doubts about the legitimacy of Fred Spiker's claims that he is the illegitimate son of Steve McQueen since he has never been vetted by an American journalist, offered up a birth certificate, or volunteered to take a DNA test," Terrill said. "Furthermore, he first made the claim in 2003, almost a quarter-century after McQueen's death. If Spiker is Steve McQueen's son, I say the burden is upon him to show us the proof."

Brantingham also reached Spiker for comment, who told the reporter, "I quit using the name. There was no proof, and I decided it just wasn't worth it. This is stupid. I am me, and this is my face."

== Filmography ==
- Lorelei (2005)
- Ashita e no Yuigon (2007) (Best Wishes For Tomorrow)
- 20-seiki shônen: Dai 2 shô - Saigo no kibô (2009) (20th Century Boys: Chapter Two - The Last Hope)
