= Tadaichi Wakamatsu =

Japanese army general (1893–1959)

- 若松 只一
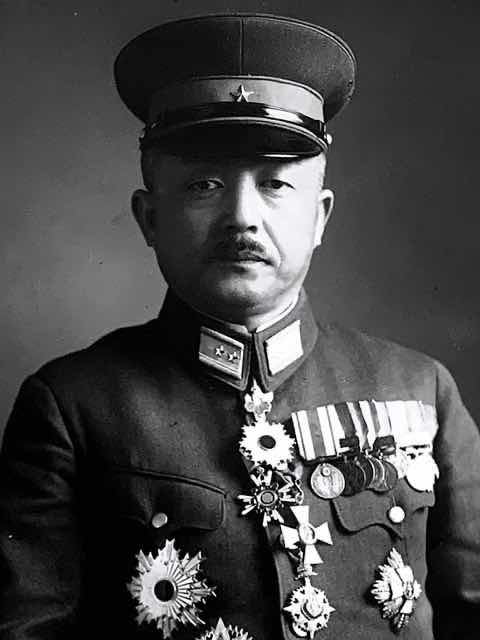
- Born: 8 March 1893; Fukushima, Japan
- Died: 19 November 1959 (aged 66)
- Military career
- Allegiance: Empire of Japan
- Branch: Imperial Japanese Army
- Service years: 1914–1945
- Rank: Lieutenant general
- Unit: Army General Staff
- Commands: Vice Minister of War
- Conflicts: Second Sino-Japanese War; World War II; Kyūjō incident

Tadaichi Wakamatsu (若松 只一, Wakamatsu Tadaichi; 8 March 1893 – 19 November 1959), also known as Tadakazu Wakamatsu, was a general in the Imperial Japanese Army during World War II.

In 1935, Wakamatsu was a lieutenant colonel in the Army General Staff. Under orders from Prince Kan'in Kotohito, Wakamatsu was sent to Berlin, where he was involved in the forging of the Anti-Comintern Pact.

As a general, Wakamatsu served in various army and army group level staff officer positions until he was appointed as the Vice Minister of War in April 1945, during the last months of the Pacific War. In August 1945 he was involved in the Kyūjō incident and played a role in ensuring that the army followed Hirohito's orders to surrender.

After the war Wakamatsu testified as a witness at the Tokyo Trials.

In July 1948, he was arrested on suspicion of being involved in the mistreatment of Allied prisoners of war (POWs) on hell ships. After being tried as a Class B war criminal at the Yokohama War Crimes Trials he was found guilty and sentenced to 2 years of hard labor.
