= Tokyo Charter =

Post-WWII laws of adjudication of Japan's war crimes

The International Military Tribunal for the Far East Charter (IMTFE Charter), also known as the Tokyo Charter, was the decree issued by General Douglas MacArthur, Supreme Commander for the Allied Powers in Allied-occupied Japan, on January 19, 1946 that set down the laws and procedures by which the Tokyo Trials were to be conducted. The charter was issued months following the surrender of Japan on September 2, 1945, which brought World War II to an end.

Modeled after the Nuremberg Charter, the Tokyo Charter stipulated that crimes of the Japanese could be tried. Three categories of crimes were defined: crimes against peace, war crimes, and crimes against humanity. Article 6 of the Tokyo Charter also stated that holding an official position or acting pursuant to order of his government or of a superior was no defense to war crimes, but that such circumstances may be considered in mitigation of punishment if the Tribunal determines that justice so requires.

Like the Nuremberg Trials, the criminal procedure used by the Tokyo Trials was closer to civil law than to common law, with a trial before a panel of judges rather than a jury trial and with wide allowance for hearsay evidence. Defendants who were found guilty could appeal the verdict to the Allied Council for Japan. In addition, they would be permitted to present evidence in their defense and to cross-examine witnesses.

Unlike the Nuremberg Charter, the Tokyo Charter was not part of a treaty or agreement among the Allies but it was substantially the same as the Nuremberg Charter. A major exception was that Emperor Hirohito was excluded from being tried for crimes against peace, war crimes, and crimes against humanity.

The Tokyo Charter differs from the Nuremberg Charter in another way. The Tokyo Charter does not make "persecution" subject to "religious" grounds. This is because the Nazi crimes against the Jews did not have a counterpart in the Asian conflict.

The Nuremberg and Tokyo Charters were applicable only to major criminals, leaving other criminals to be tried by the Allies. In Germany, the Allies acted pursuant to Control Council Law No. 10 (CCL 10) in their respective zones of occupation. But they also relied on their military and national tribunals, where they applied their own laws. There was no counterpart in Japan to CCL 10 because the United States was the sole occupying power of Japan, whereas Germany was occupied by the four major Allies (United States, Great Britain, France, and the Soviet Union). The same legal issues pertaining to Article 6(c) of the Nuremberg Charter also apply to Article 5(c) of the Tokyo Charter.

== See also ==
- Cases before the International Criminal Court
- Command responsibility
- Crimina juris gentium
- Geneva Conventions
- Hague Conventions of 1899 and 1907
- Genocide
- International humanitarian law
- International Law
- Jus ad bellum
- Jus in bello
- List of war crimes
- Nuremberg Principles
- Peace Palace
- Superior orders (Pre-Nuremberg history of "I was just following superior orders")
- War Crimes Act of 1996
