= Kaichi Hirate =

Japanese officer, war criminal 1902–1946

- 平手 嘉一
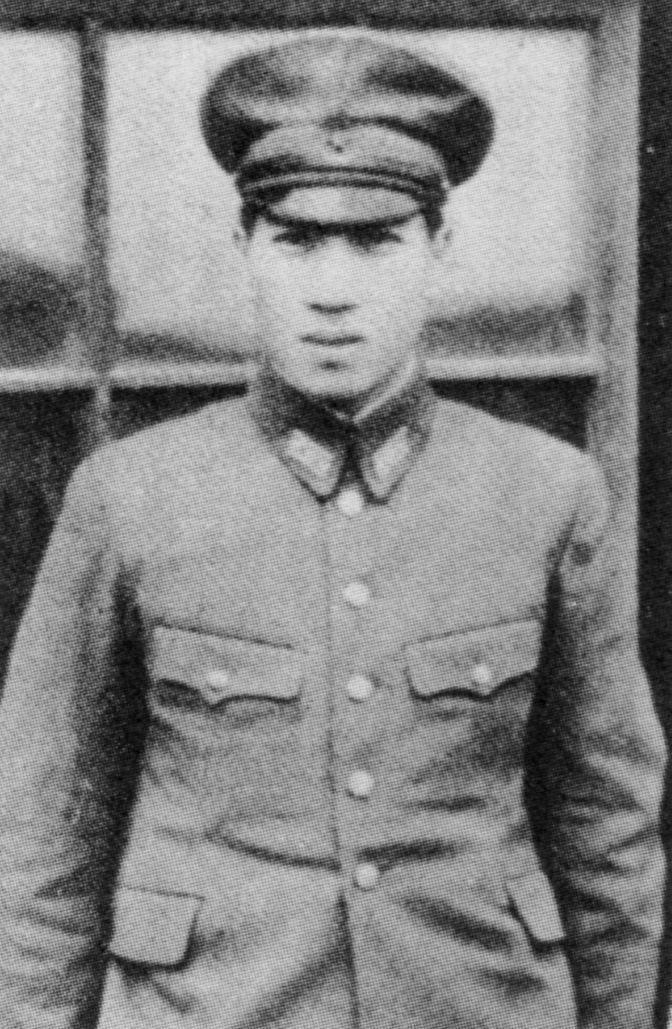
- Born: March 12, 1909
- Died: May 10, 1946 (aged 37); Sugamo Prison, Japan
- Military career
- Allegiance: Empire of Japan
- Branch: Imperial Japanese Army
- Rank: Captain
- Commands: Hakodate First Branch Camp
- Conflicts: World War II
- Criminal information
- Status: Executed by hanging
- Conviction: War crimes
- Trial: Yokohama War Crimes Trials
- Penalty: Death

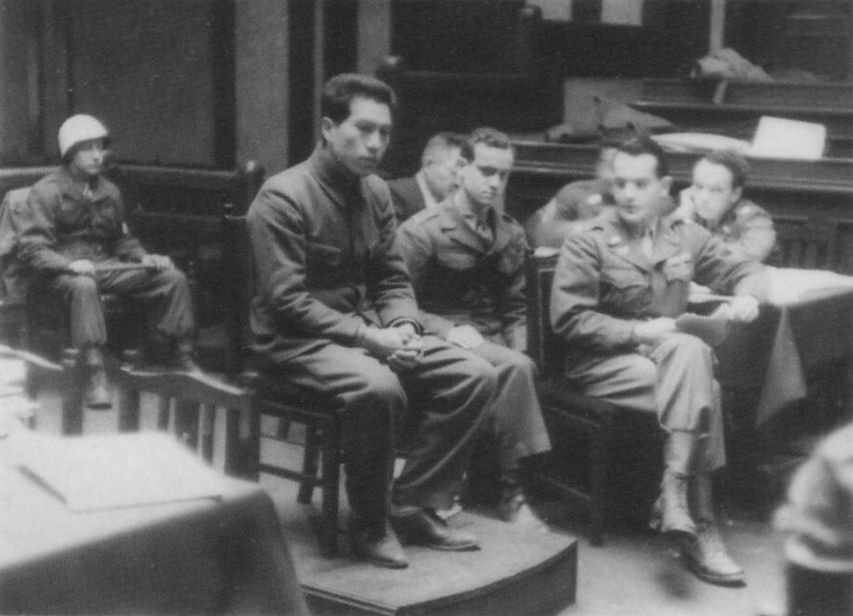
Hirate during war trial on January 23, 1946

Kaichi Hirate (平手 嘉一, Hirate Kaichi; March 12, 1909 – May 10, 1946) was a Captain in the Imperial Japanese Army. During World War II, he was commandant of the First Branch Camp at Hakodate.

In 1946, Hirate was charged with mistreating of prisoners of war resulting in death. He was tried by a U.S. military tribunal at the Yokohama War Crimes Trials. Hirate was found guilty, sentenced to death, and hanged at Sugamo Prison in 1946.
