= 1960 in Japan =

- Decades: 1940s; 1950s; 1960s; 1970s; 1980s
- See also: Other events of 1960; History of Japan • Timeline • Years

Events in the year 1960 in Japan. It corresponds to Shōwa 35 (昭和35年) in the Japanese calendar.

1960 was a year of prolonged and intense political struggles in Japan. The massive and often quite violent Miike Coal Mine Strike at the Miike Coal Mine in Kyushu lasted nearly the entire year, and the massive nationwide Anpo Protests against renewal of the U.S.-Japan Security Treaty carried over from 1959 and climaxed in June, forcing the resignation of Prime Minister Nobusuke Kishi and the cancellation of a planned visit to Japan by then-American President Dwight D. Eisenhower. In October, Japan Socialist Party Chairman Inejirō Asanuma was assassinated by a right-wing nationalist during a debate in the runup to that year's general election.

== Incumbents ==
- Emperor: Hirohito (Emperor Shōwa)
- Prime Minister:
  - Nobusuke Kishi (L) until July 19
  - Hayato Ikeda (L)
- Chief Justice of Japan: Kōtarō Tanaka until October 24, Kisaburo Yokota
- Chief Cabinet Secretary: Etsusaburō Shiina until July 19, Masayoshi Ōhira
- Speaker of the House of Representatives of Japan: Ryōgorō Katō until February 1, Ichirō Kiyose
- Speaker of the House of Councillors of Japan: Tsuruhei Matsuno

=== Governors ===
- Aichi Prefecture: Mikine Kuwahara
- Akita Prefecture: Yūjirō Obata
- Aomori Prefecture: Iwao Yamazaki
- Chiba Prefecture: Hitoshi Shibata
- Ehime Prefecture: Sadatake Hisamatsu
- Fukui Prefecture: Eizō Kita
- Fukuoka Prefecture: Taichi Uzaki
- Fukushima Prefecture: Zenichiro Satō
- Gifu Prefecture: Yukiyasu Matsuno
- Gunma Prefecture: Toshizo Takekoshi (until 1 August); Konroku Kanda (starting 2 August)
- Hiroshima Prefecture: Hiroo Ōhara
- Hokkaido: Kingo Machimura
- Hyogo Prefecture: Masaru Sakamoto
- Ibaraki Prefecture: Nirō Iwakami
- Ishikawa Prefecture: Jūjitsu Taya
- Iwate Prefecture: Senichi Abe
- Kagawa Prefecture: Masanori Kaneko
- Kagoshima Prefecture: Katsushi Terazono
- Kanagawa Prefecture: Iwataro Uchiyama
- Kochi Prefecture: Masumi Mizobuchi
- Kumamoto Prefecture: Kōsaku Teramoto
- Kyoto Prefecture: Torazō Ninagawa
- Mie Prefecture: Satoru Tanaka
- Miyagi Prefecture: Yoshio Miura
- Miyazaki Prefecture: Hiroshi Kuroki
- Nagano Prefecture: Gon'ichirō Nishizawa
- Nagasaki Prefecture: Katsuya Sato
- Nara Prefecture: Ryozo Okuda
- Niigata Prefecture: Kazuo Kitamura
- Oita Prefecture: Kaoru Kinoshita
- Okayama Prefecture: Yukiharu Miki
- Osaka Prefecture: Gisen Satō
- Saga Prefecture: Sunao Ikeda
- Saitama Prefecture: Hiroshi Kurihara
- Shiga Prefecture: Kyujiro Taniguchi
- Shiname Prefecture: Choemon Tanabe
- Shizuoka Prefecture: Toshio Saitō
- Tochigi Prefecture: Nobuo Yokokawa
- Tokushima Prefecture: Kikutaro Hara
- Tokyo: Ryōtarō Azuma
- Tottori Prefecture: Jirō Ishiba
- Toyama Prefecture: Minoru Yoshida
- Wakayama Prefecture: Shinji Ono
- Yamagata Prefecture: Tōkichi Abiko
- Yamaguchi Prefecture: Taro Ozawa (until 17 August); Masayuki Hashimoto (starting 25 September)
- Yamanashi Prefecture: Hisashi Amano

== Events ==
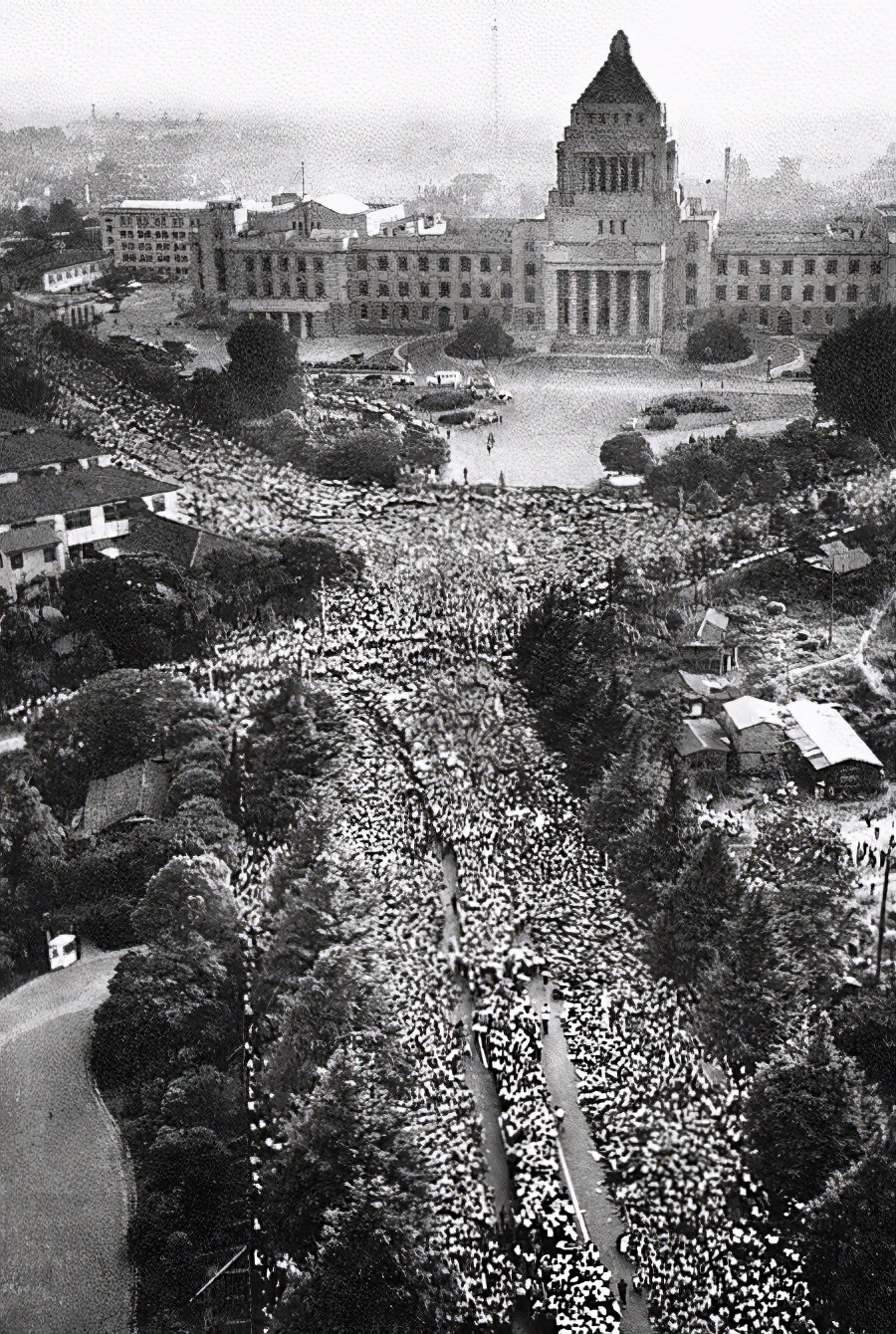
As part of the Anpo Protests against the U.S.-Japan Security Treaty, masses of protestors flood the streets around Japan's National Diet building, June 18, 1960

- January 15 – The first televised anime, Three Tales, is broadcast on NHK in Japan.
- January 19 – Prime Minister Kishi and President Eisenhower sign the revised Treaty of Mutual Cooperation and Security Between the United States and Japan at a ceremony in Washington D.C.
- January 19 – Mitsui corporation locks protesting miners out of the Miike Coal Mine in Kyushu, launching the 312-day Miike Coal Mine Strike.
- February 23 – Naruhito, son of Akihito and Michiko is born in Tokyo Imperial Palace.
- February 23 – As part of the ongoing Miike Struggle, picketing coal miner Kiyoshi Kubo is stabbed to death by a yakuza gangster.
- May 19 – The "May 19th Incident" – Prime Minister Kishi unexpectedly calls for a snap vote on the revised Security Treaty and has police drag opposition Diet Members out of the National Diet to pass the treaty with only members of his own party present.

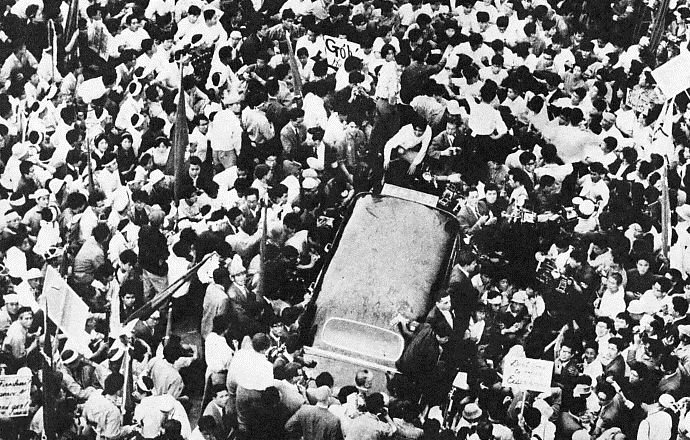
Hagerty's car is mobbed by protestors, June 10, 1960

- June 10 – The "Hagerty Incident" – A car carrying Eisenhower's press secretary James Hagerty and U.S. Ambassador to Japan Douglas MacArthur II is mobbed by protesters outside of Tokyo's Haneda Airport, requiring the occupants to be rescued by a U.S. Marines helicopter.
- June 15 – The "June 15 Incident" – As part of the Anpo protests, radical student activists from Zengakuren attempt to storm the National Diet compound, precipitating a battle with police in which female Tokyo University student Michiko Kanba is killed.
- June 19 – The new U.S.-Japan Security Treaty is automatically ratified 30 days after passing the Lower House of the Diet.
- July 15 – The Kishi cabinet resigns en masse to take responsibility for the violent Anpo Protests. Kishi is officially succeeded as prime minister by Hayato Ikeda on July 19.
- July 24 – According to Japan National Police Agency official confirmed report, a charter bus collision with regular route bus, charter bus plunge into cliff in mountain road, Mount Hiei, Otsu, Shiga Prefecture, 28 person were perish, 16 person were hurt.
- August 10 – lubricant brand Kure Engineering was founded.
- August 25 – September 11 – Japan competes at the Olympics in Rome and win 4 gold, 7 silver and 7 bronze medals.
- September 22 – Then-Crown Prince Akihito and then-Crown Princess Michiko both announced that they ahead of two-week tour with their arrival in Honolulu, Hawaii.
- September 27 to 29 – Then-Crown Prince Akihito and then-Crown Princess Michiko both visits the United States of America, where they both met with then-American President Dwight D. Eisenhower and Mamie Eisenhower in Washington D.C. during a two-week state visit that included a state dinner at the White House. Their visit marked 100th anniversary of diplomatic relations between Japan and the United States of America.
- October 7 – Then-Crown Prince Akihito and then-Crown Princess Michiko both arrived back in Haneda Airport in Tokyo after two-week state visit to the United States of America.
- October 12 – The Assassination of Inejirō Asanuma – Japan Socialist Party Chairman Inejirō Asanuma is assassinated by a right-wing ultra-nationalist teenager Otoya Yamaguchi while speaking in a televised political debate in Tokyo.
- December 1 – Striking coal miners at the Miike Coal Mine return to work, ending the 312-day Miike Struggle.

== Births ==
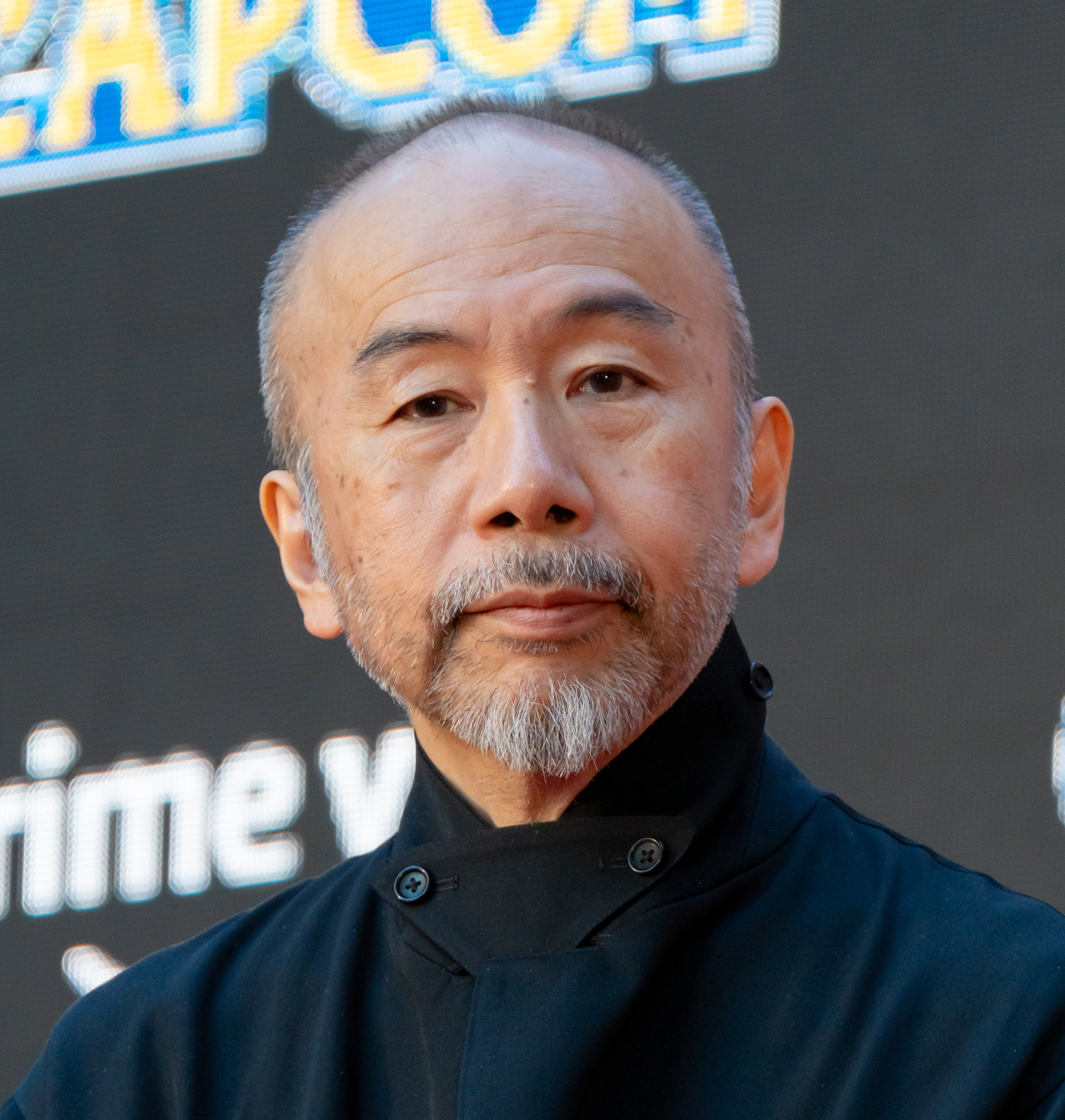
Shinya Tsukamoto, Japanese film director and actor

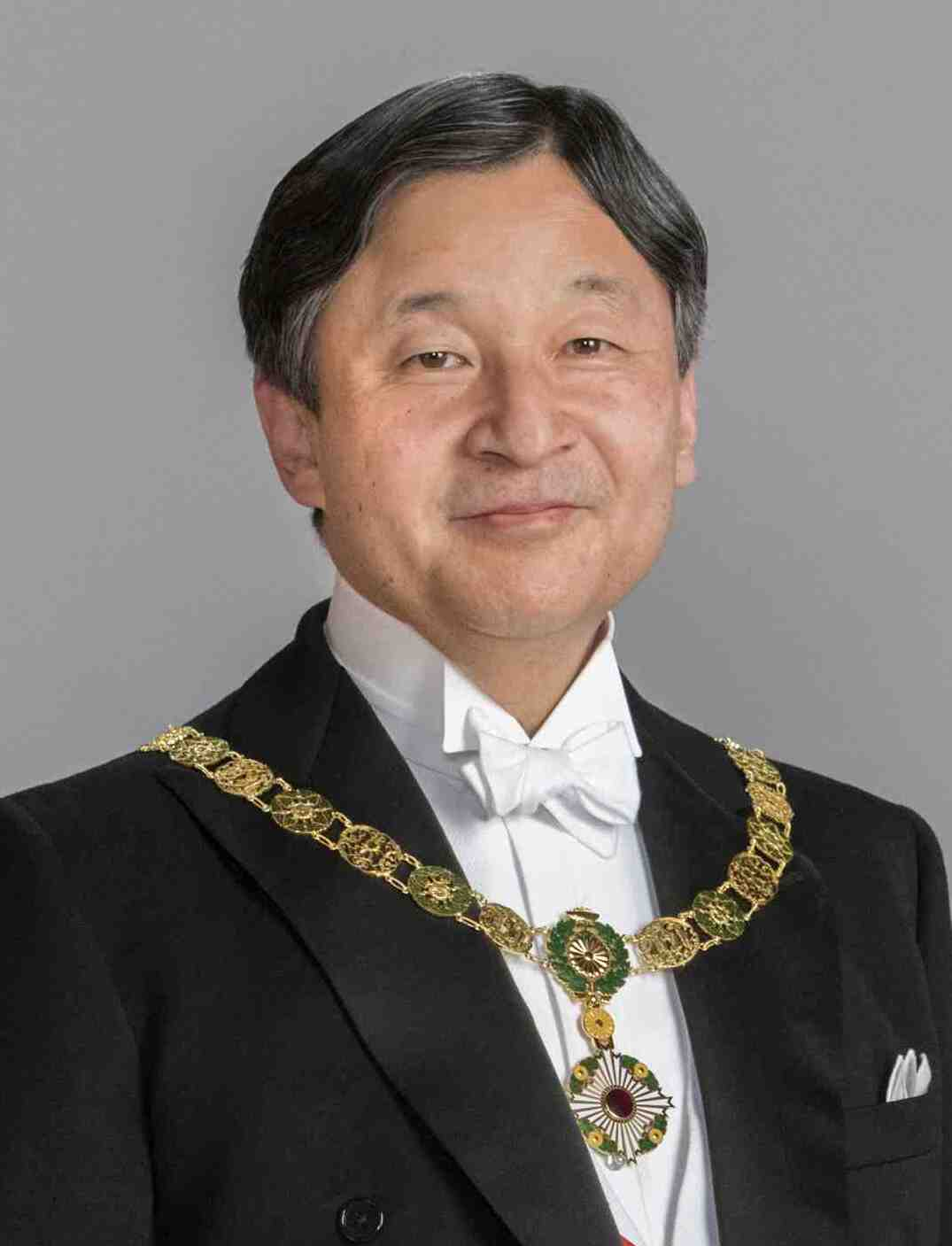
Naruhito, Emperor of Japan

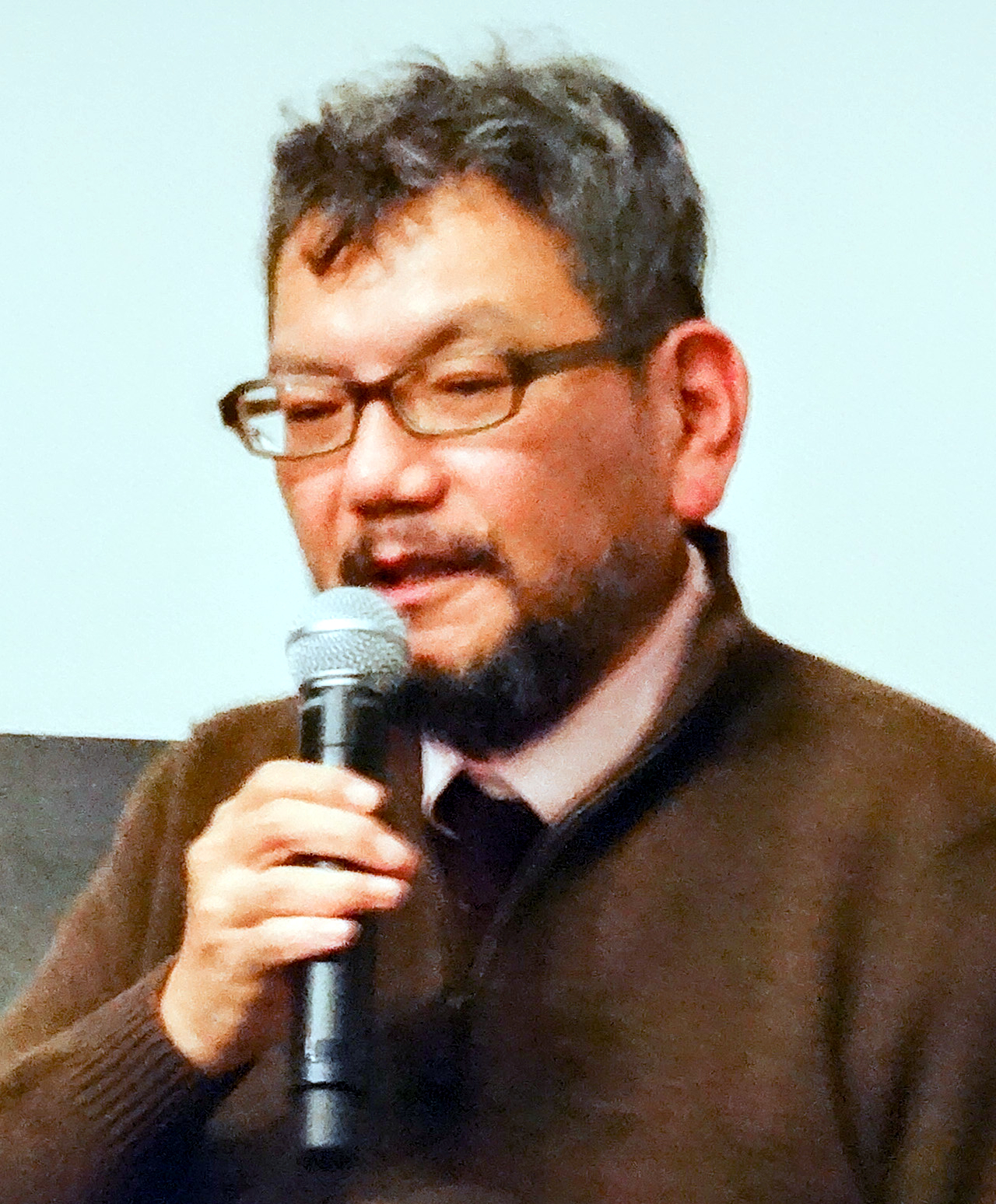
Hideaki Anno, Japanese animator, director, and actor

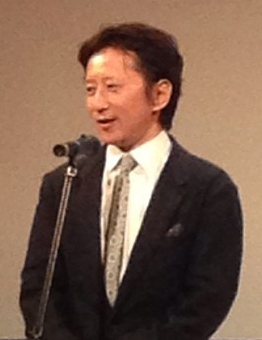
Hirohiko Araki, Japanese manga artist and the creator of JoJo's Bizarre Adventure

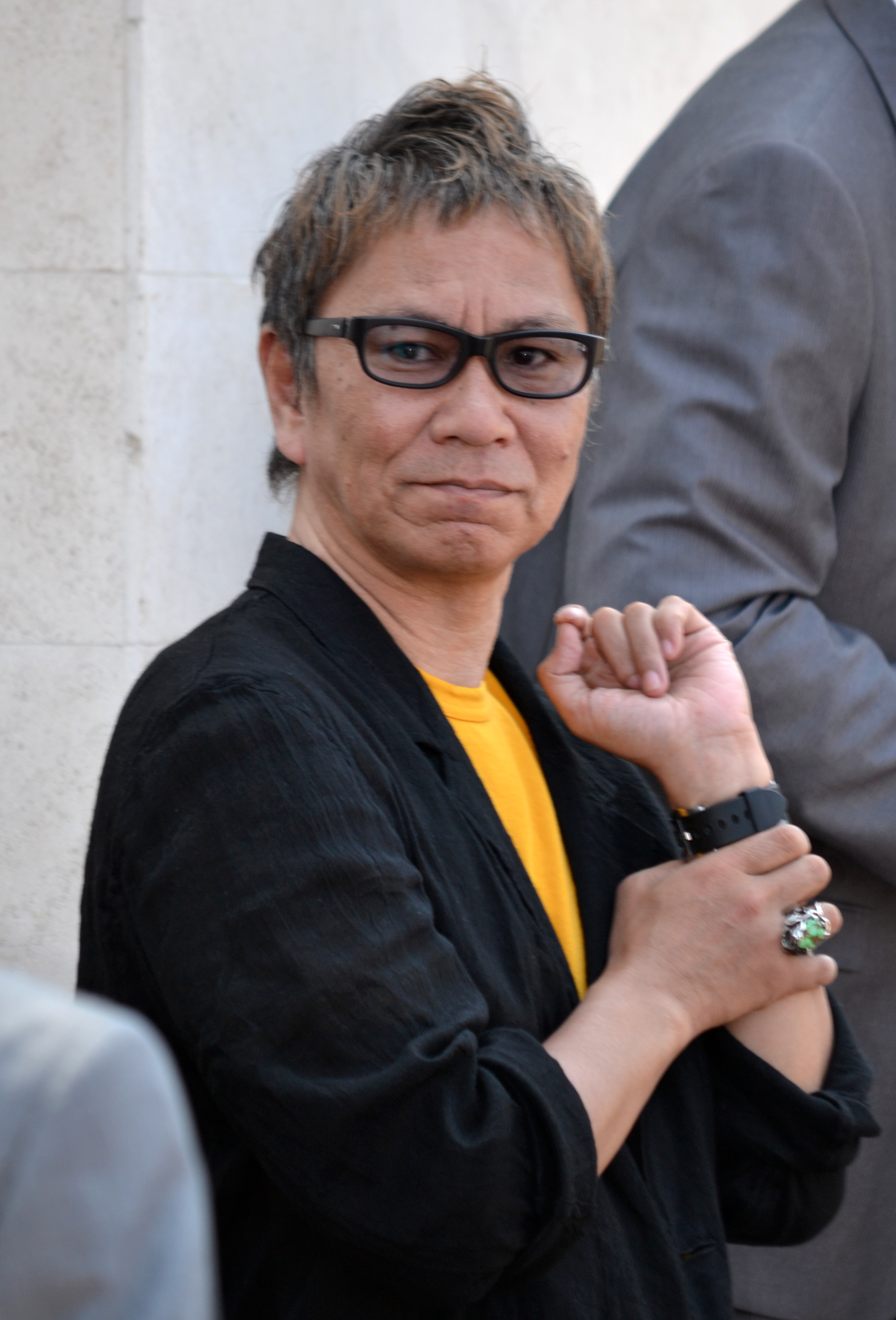
Takashi Miike, Japanese director, producer, and screenwriter

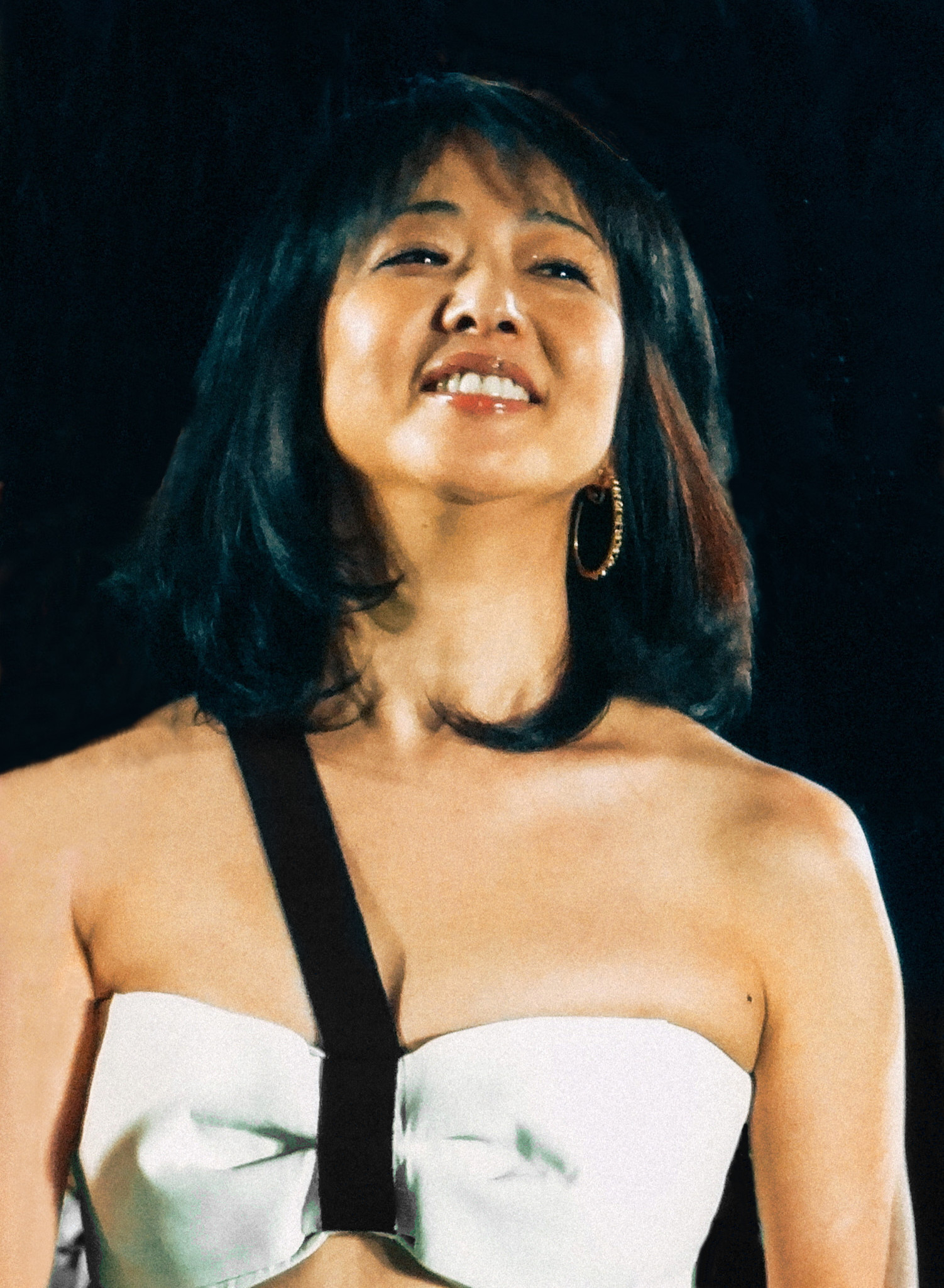
Jun Miho, Japanese actress

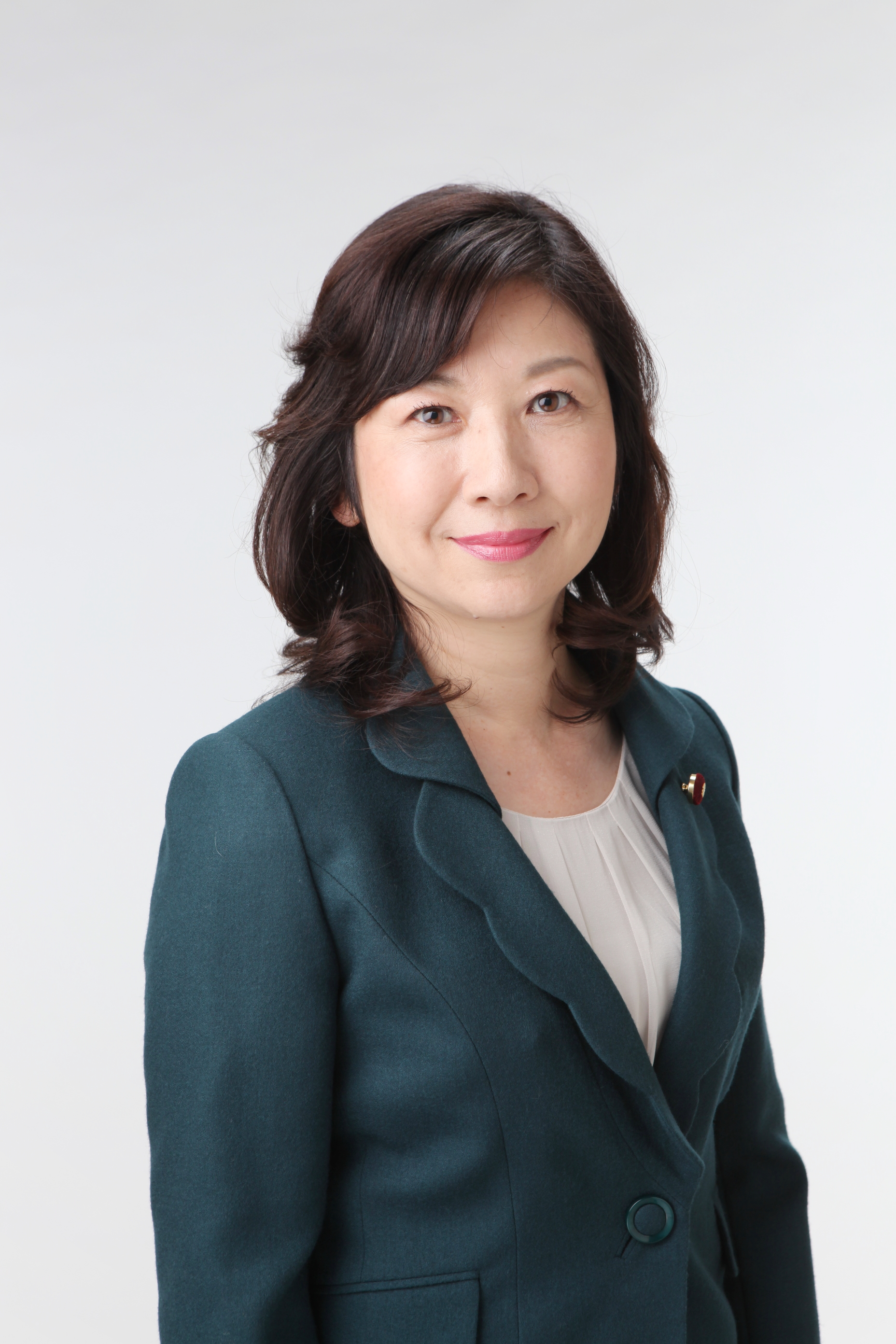
Seiko Noda, Japanese politician and cabinet minister

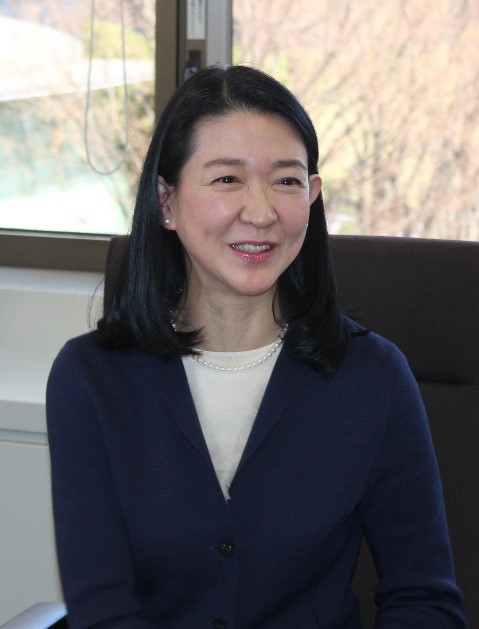
Misako Konno, Japanese actress and essayist

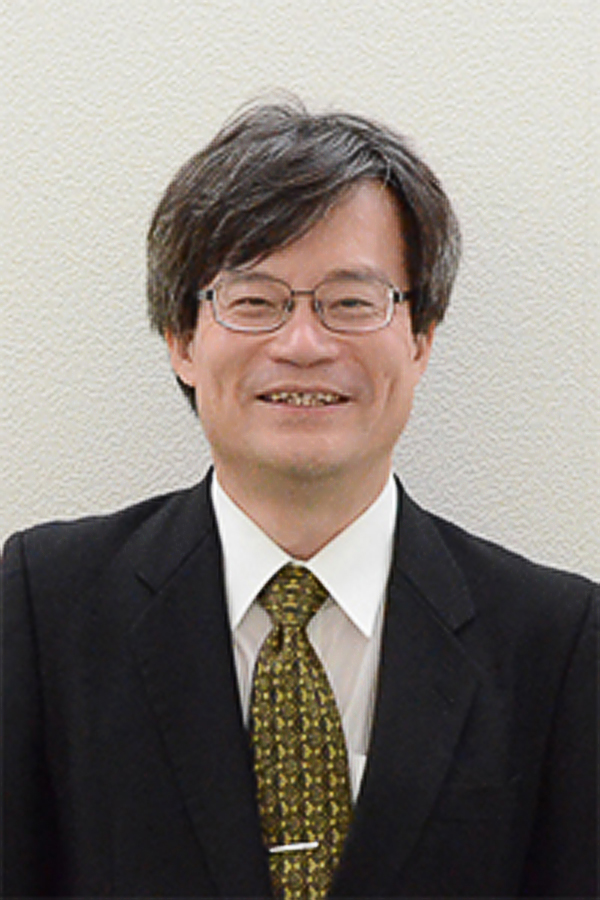
Hiroshi Amano, Nobel Prize-winning Japanese physicist, engineer, and inventor

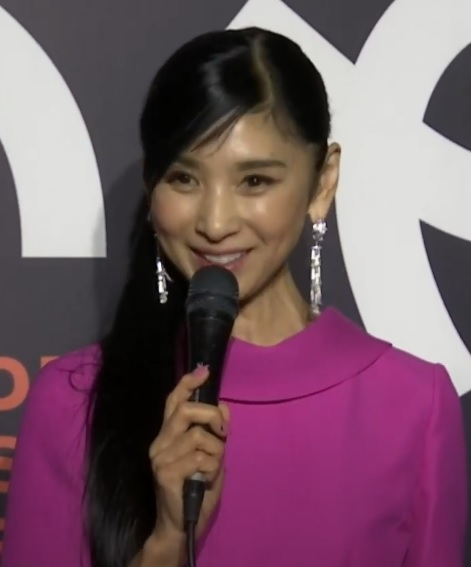
Hitomi Kuroki, Japanese actress

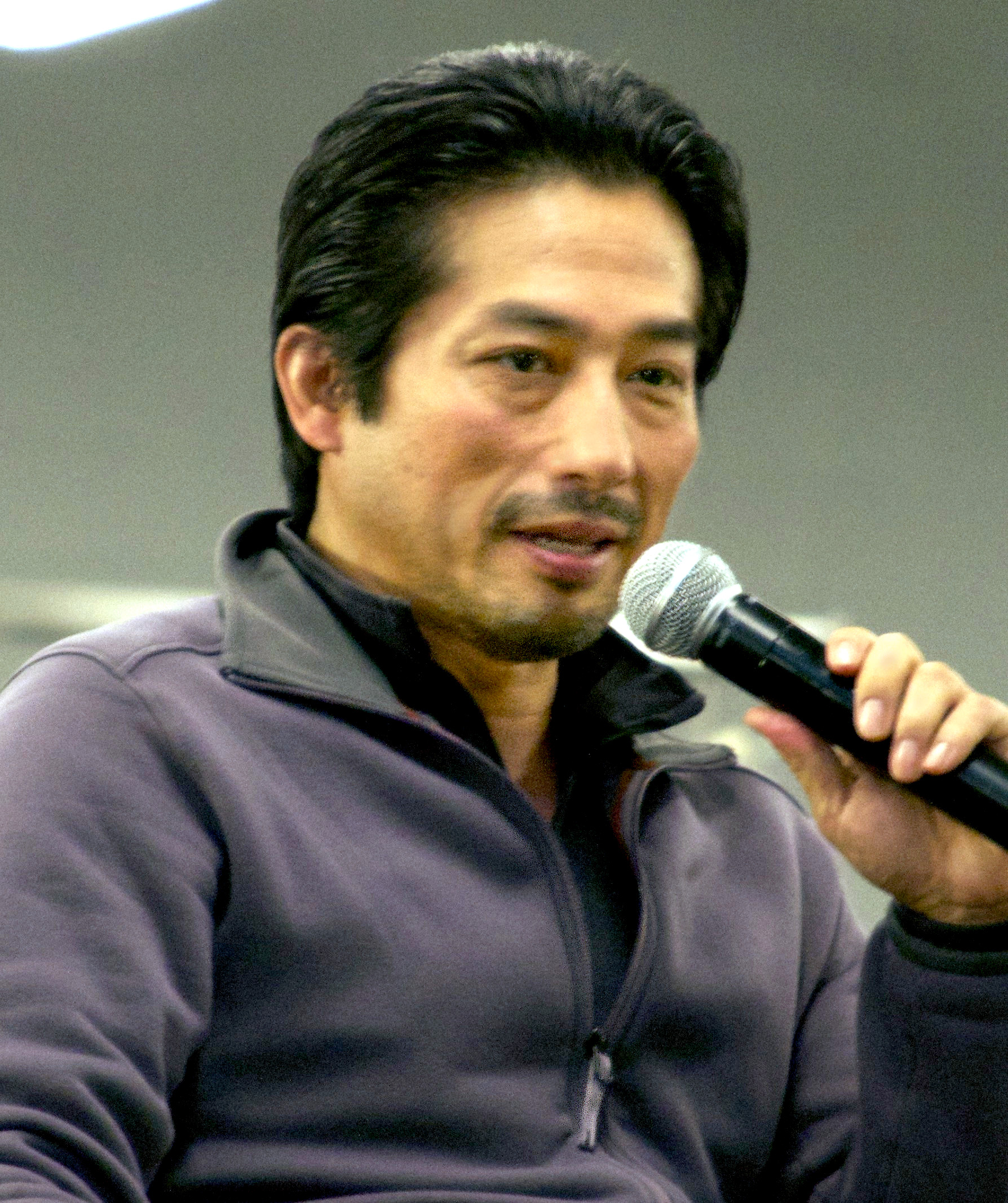
Hiroyuki Sanada, Japanese actor

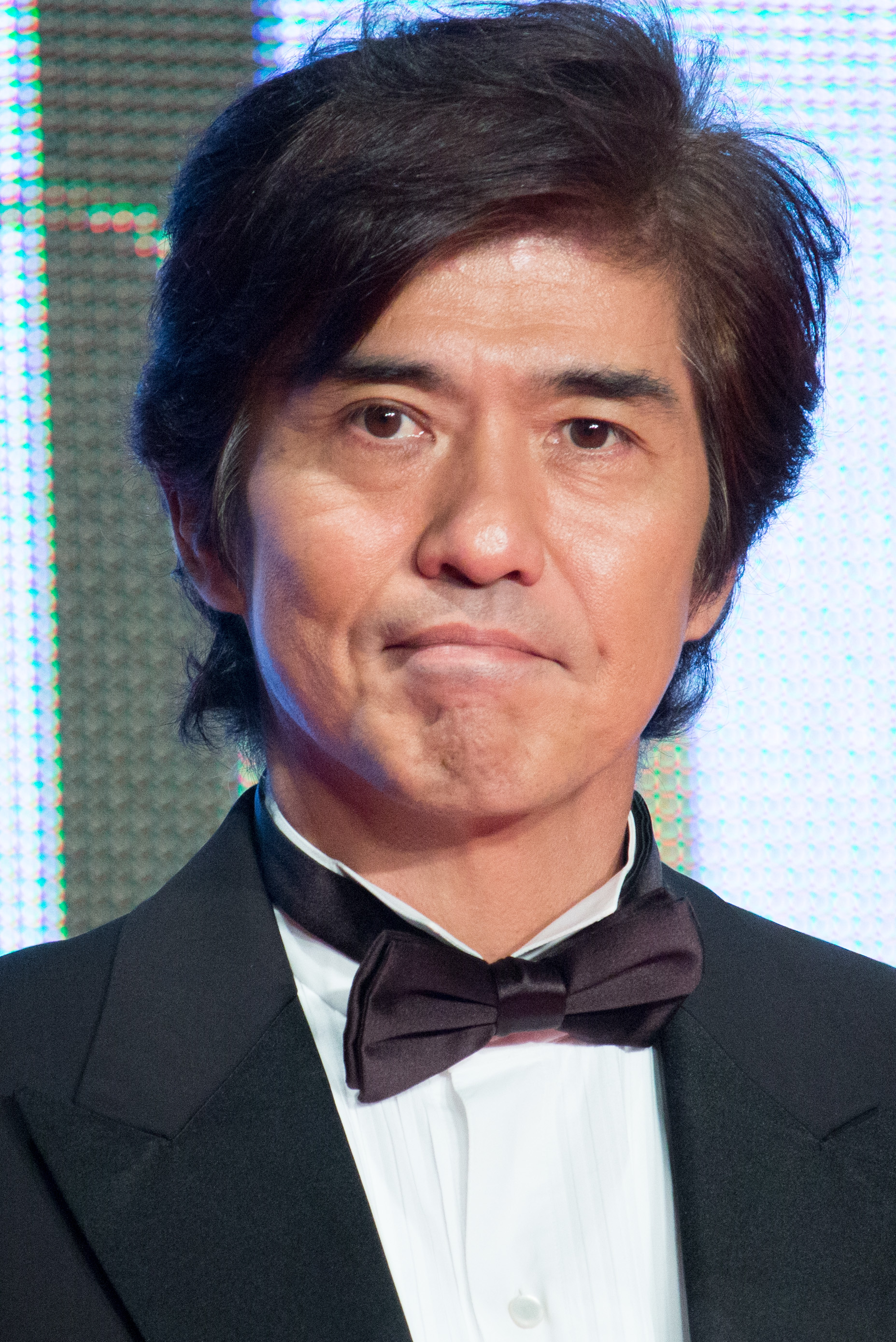
Koichi Sato, Japanese actor

Many notable Japanese individuals from Young Japanese Baby Boom/Danso Generation were born in 1960, such as Shinya Tsukamoto, Kumiko Ōba, Miki Narahashi, Emperor Naruhito, Hideaki Ōmura, Maki Nomiya, Yoko Tawada, Hiromi Tsuru, Kanako Fukaura, Osamu Sato, Izumi Aki, Hideaki Anno, JoJo's Bizarre Adventure creator Hirohiko Araki, Mizue Takada, Yūko Asano, anime director Hiroshi Negishi, Michie Nakamaru, Jun Miho, Yuki Ninagawa, Asa Nonami, Takashi Miike, Seiko Noda, Nobel Prize-winning physicist Hiroshi Amano, Misako Konno, Mayo Suzukaze, Hitomi Kuroki, Kyosuke Himuro, Kōji Kamibayashi, Hiroyuki Sanada, Eri Ishida, Naomi Kawashima, Koichi Sato, Miki Takakura, Tarako, and Kazuhide Uekusa. While many notable Japanese individuals from Shinjinrui Generation were born within Capricorn, roughly between December 22 and 31 of the same year, such as Fuyumi Ono and Kayoko Kishimoto.

=== January–March ===
- January 1 – Shinya Tsukamoto, film director and actor
- January 6 – Kumiko Ohba, actress, singer, and psychological counselor
- January 25 – Miki Narahashi, voice actress
- February 23 – Naruhito, 126th Emperor of Japan
- March 9 – Hideaki Ōmura, politician and Governor of Aichi Prefecture
- March 12 – Maki Nomiya, singer and musician
- March 23 – Yoko Tawada, writer
- March 29 – Hiromi Tsuru, voice actress (d. 2017)

=== April–June ===
- April 4 – Kanako Fukaura, actress (d. 2008)
- April 14 – Osamu Sato, digital artist, video game developer, photographer, and composer
- April 24 – Masami Kikuchi, voice actor
- May 15 – Izumi Aki, actress
- May 22 – Hideaki Anno, animator, director, and actor
- June 7 – Hirohiko Araki, manga artist and the creator of JoJo's Bizarre Adventure
- June 23 – Mizue Takada, singer

=== July–September ===
- July 9 – Yūko Asano, actress and singer
- July 18 – Hiroshi Negishi, anime director
- July 24 – Michie Nakamaru, opera singer
- August 4 – Jun Miho, actress
- August 18 – Yuki Ninagawa, actress
- August 19 – Asa Nonami, writer
- August 24 – Takashi Miike, director, producer, and screenwriter
- September 3 – Seiko Noda, politician and cabinet minister
- September 8 – Misako Konno, actress and essayist
- September 11
  - Hiroshi Amano, Nobel Prize-winning physicist, engineer, and inventor
  - Mayo Suzukaze, actress and voice actress
- September 25 – Kaoru Tada, manga artist (d. 1999)

=== October–December ===
- October 5
  - Hitomi Kuroki, actress
  - Toru Takahashi, race car driver (d. 1983)
- October 7 – Kyosuke Himuro, singer-songwriter
- October 10 – Kōji Kamibayashi, television former CEO
- October 12 – Hiroyuki Sanada, actor
- October 13 – Mariko Tsutsui, actress
- October 17 – Chie Kōjiro, voice actress
- November 9 – Eri Ishida, actress
- November 10 – Naomi Kawashima, actress, singer and radio entertainer (d. 2015)
- December 10 – Koichi Sato, actor
- December 14 – Miki Takakura, idol and actress
- December 17 – Tarako, actress, voice actress, and musician (d. 2024)
- December 18 – Kazuhide Uekusa, economist
- December 24 – Fuyumi Ono, novelist
- December 29 – Kayoko Kishimoto, actress

== Deaths ==
- January 24 – Ashihei Hino, writer (b. 1907)
- June 15 – Michiko Kanba, political activist (b. 1937)
- August 28 – Takeru Inukai, politician and novelist (b. 1896)
- October 12 – Inejiro Asanuma, politician (b. 1898)
- November 2 – Otoya Yamaguchi, assassin (b. 1943)

== See also ==
- List of Japanese films of 1960
- 1960 in Japanese music
