= 1959 in Japan =

- Decades: 1930s; 1940s; 1950s; 1960s; 1970s
- See also: Other events of 1959; History of Japan; Timeline; Years

Events in the year 1959 in Japan. It corresponds to Shōwa 34 (昭和34年) in the Japanese calendar.

== Incumbents ==
- Emperor: Hirohito
- Prime minister: Nobusuke Kishi

=== Governors ===
- Aichi Prefecture: Mikine Kuwahara
- Akita Prefecture: Yūjirō Obata
- Aomori Prefecture: Iwao Yamazaki
- Chiba Prefecture: Hitoshi Shibata
- Ehime Prefecture: Sadatake Hisamatsu
- Fukui Prefecture: Seiichi Hane (until 22 April); Eizō Kita (starting 23 April)
- Fukuoka Prefecture: Taichi Uzaki
- Fukushima Prefecture: Zenichiro Satō
- Gifu Prefecture: Yukiyasu Matsuno
- Gunma Prefecture: Toshizo Takekoshi
- Hiroshima Prefecture: Hiroo Ōhara
- Hokkaido: Toshifumi Tanaka (until 22 April); Kingo Machimura (starting 23 April)
- Hyogo Prefecture: Masaru Sakamoto
- Ibaraki Prefecture: Yoji Tomosue (until 29 March); Nirō Iwakami (starting 23 April)
- Ishikawa Prefecture: Jūjitsu Taya
- Iwate Prefecture: Senichi Abe
- Kagawa Prefecture: Masanori Kaneko
- Kagoshima Prefecture: Katsushi Terazono
- Kanagawa Prefecture: Iwataro Uchiyama
- Kochi Prefecture: Masumi Mizobuchi
- Kumamoto Prefecture: Saburō Sakurai (until 10 February); Kōsaku Teramoto (starting 11 February)
- Kyoto Prefecture: Torazō Ninagawa
- Mie Prefecture: Satoru Tanaka
- Miyagi Prefecture: Yasushi Onuma (until 12 January); Yoshio Miura (starting 4 March)
- Miyazaki Prefecture: Jingo Futami (until 22 April); Hiroshi Kuroki (starting 23 April)
- Nagano Prefecture: Torao Hayashi (until 22 April); Gon'ichirō Nishizawa (starting 26 April)
- Nagasaki Prefecture: Katsuya Sato
- Nara Prefecture: Ryozo Okuda
- Niigata Prefecture: Kazuo Kitamura
- Oita Prefecture: Kaoru Kinoshita
- Okayama Prefecture: Yukiharu Miki
- Osaka Prefecture: Bunzō Akama (until 22 April); Gisen Satō (starting 23 April)
- Saga Prefecture: Naotsugu Nabeshima (until 16 April); Sunao Ikeda (starting 23 April)
- Saitama Prefecture: Hiroshi Kurihara
- Shiga Prefecture: Kyujiro Taniguchi
- Shiname Prefecture: Yasuo Tsunematsu (until 29 April); Choemon Tanabe (starting 30 April)
- Shizuoka Prefecture: Toshio Saitō
- Tochigi Prefecture: Kiichi Ogawa (until 4 February); Nobuo Yokokawa (starting 5 February)
- Tokushima Prefecture: Kikutaro Hara
- Tokyo: Seiichirō Yasui (until 18 April); Ryōtarō Azuma (starting 22 April)
- Tottori Prefecture: Jirō Ishiba
- Toyama Prefecture: Minoru Yoshida
- Wakayama Prefecture: Shinji Ono
- Yamagata Prefecture: Tōkichi Abiko
- Yamaguchi Prefecture: Taro Ozawa
- Yamanashi Prefecture: Hisashi Amano

== Events ==
- April 1 – Kyoto Ceramic (now Kyocera) has founded.
- April 10 – Crown Prince Akihito, the future Emperor of Japan, weds Michiko Shōda, the first commoner to marry into the Japanese Imperial Family.
- June 2 – Mori Building was founded.
- June 30 – Twenty-one students are killed and more than a hundred injured when an American North American F-100 Super Sabre jet crashes into Miamori Elementary School on the island of Okinawa. The pilot ejected before the plane struck the school.
- July 22 – A Kumamoto University medical research group studying Minamata disease concludes that it is caused by mercury.
- September 26 – According to Japanese government official confirmed report, Typhoon Vera with tidal wave hit around Ise Bay, total 5,098 person were lives, 38,921 person were hurt.

== Births ==
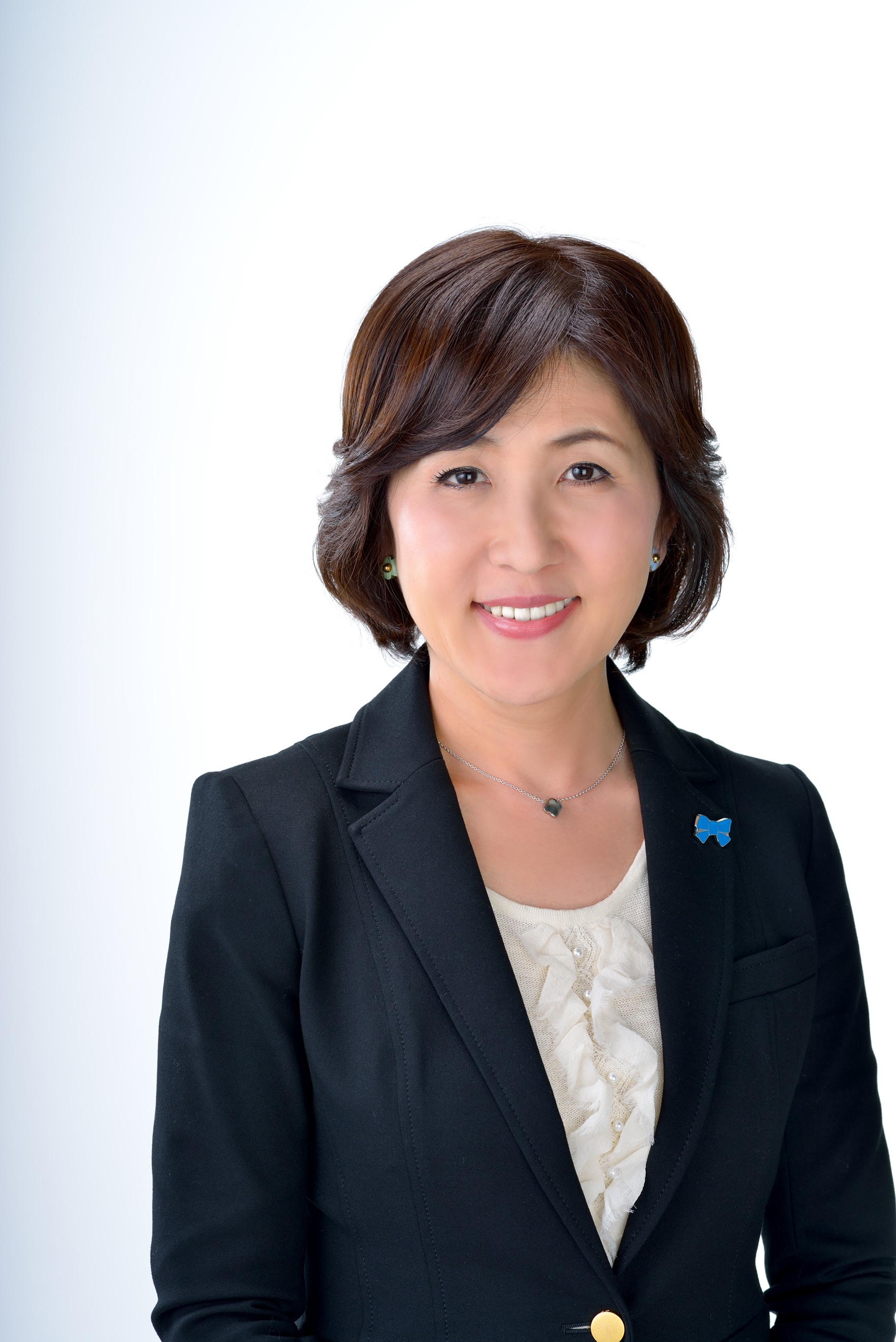
Tomomi Inada, a Japanese politician and former Minister of Defense

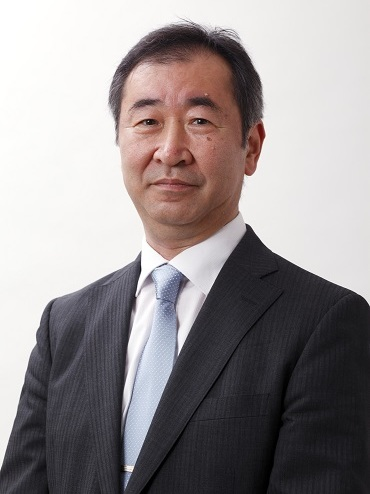
Takaaki Kajita, Nobel Prize-winning Japanese physicist

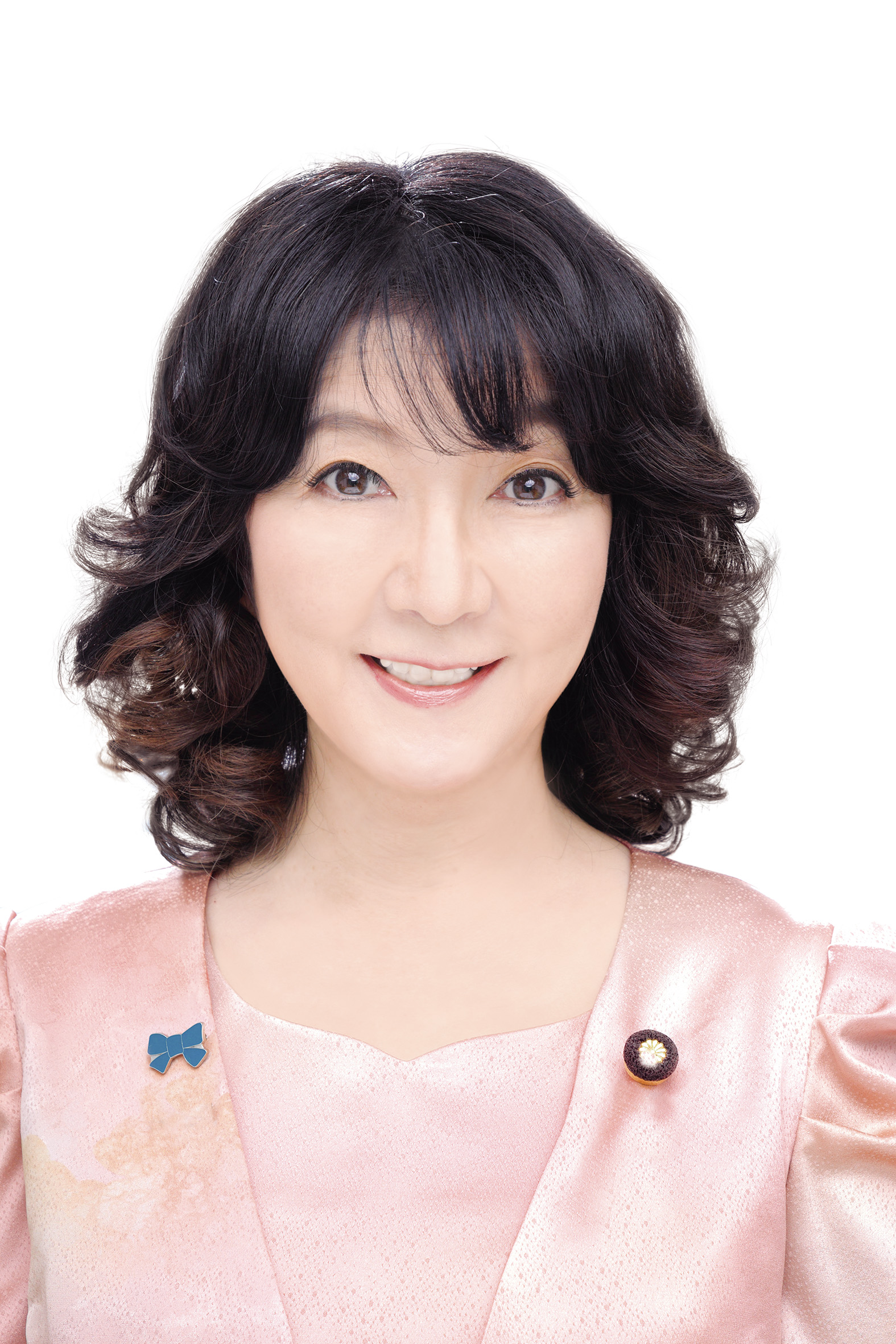
Satsuki Katayama, Japanese politician and Minister of Finance

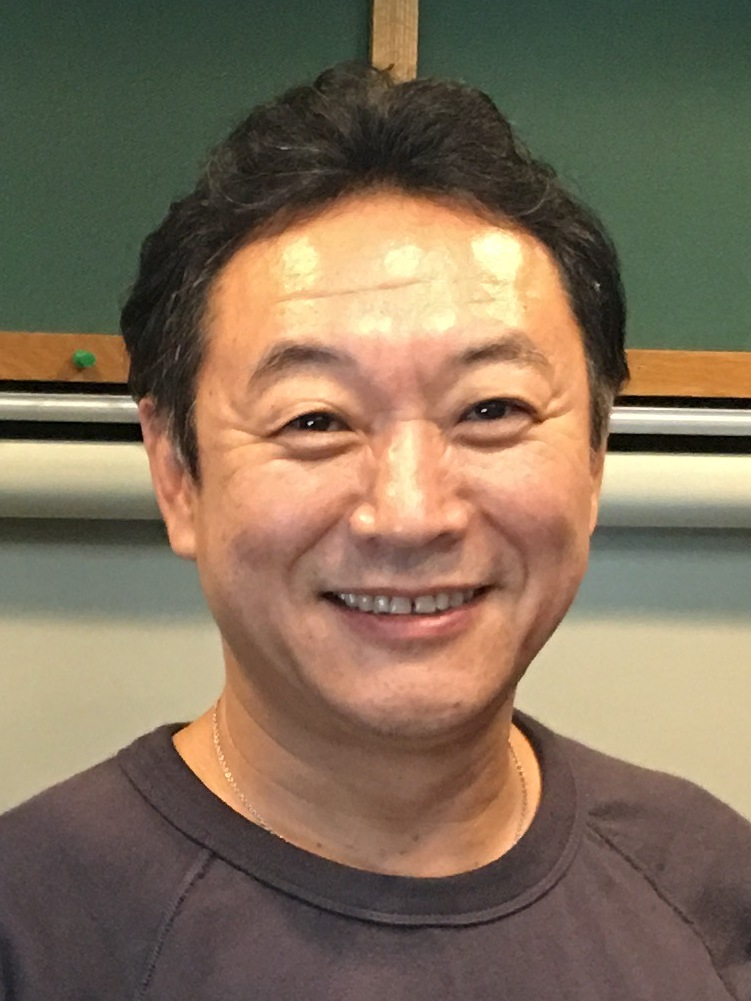
Kiyotaka Sugiyama, Japanese musician and singer-songwriter

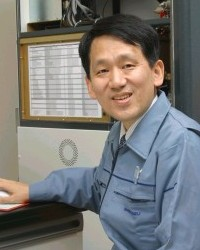
Koichi Tanaka, Japanese electrical engineer

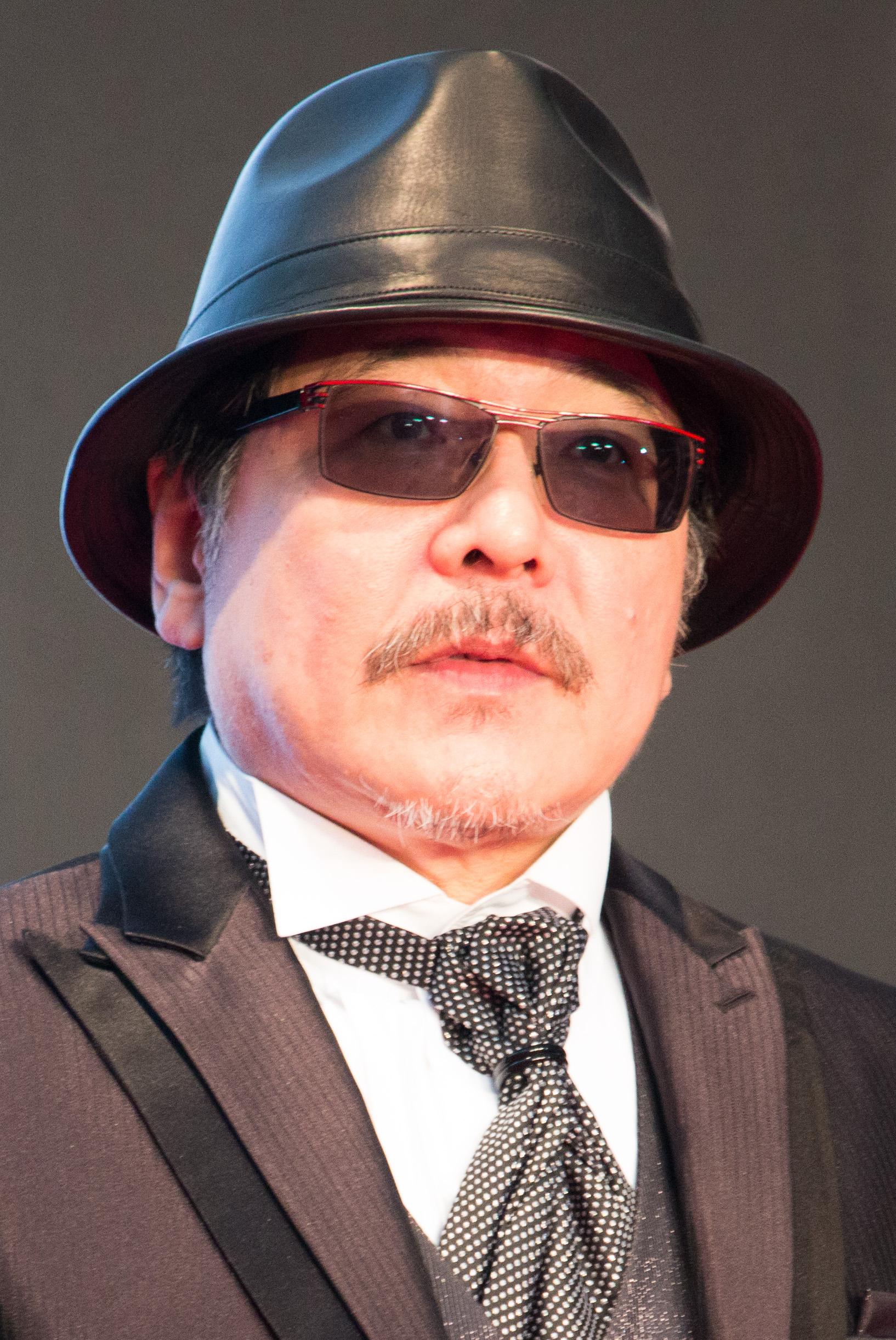
Keita Amemiya, Japanese film director and screenwriter

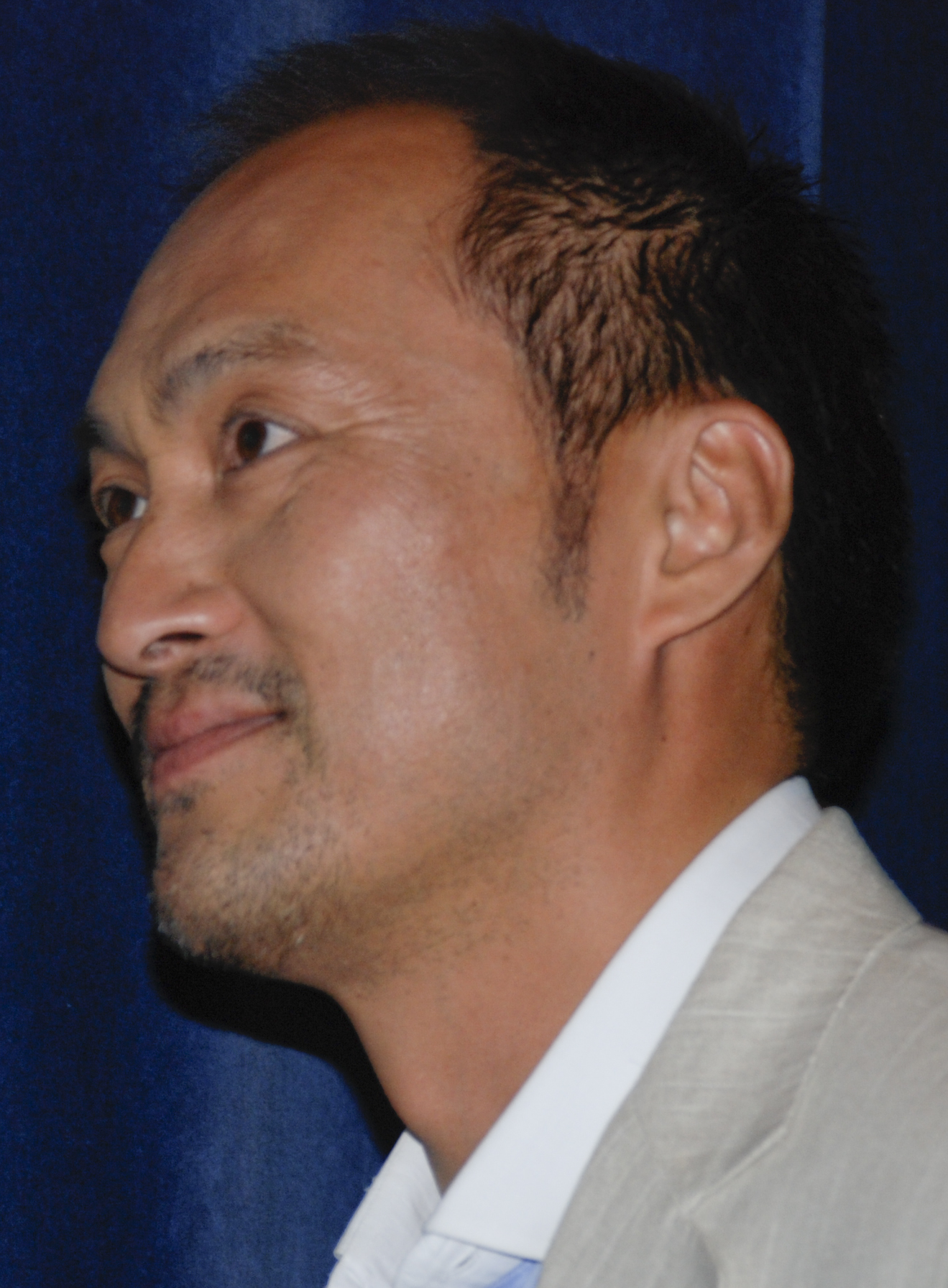
Ken Watanabe, Japanese actor

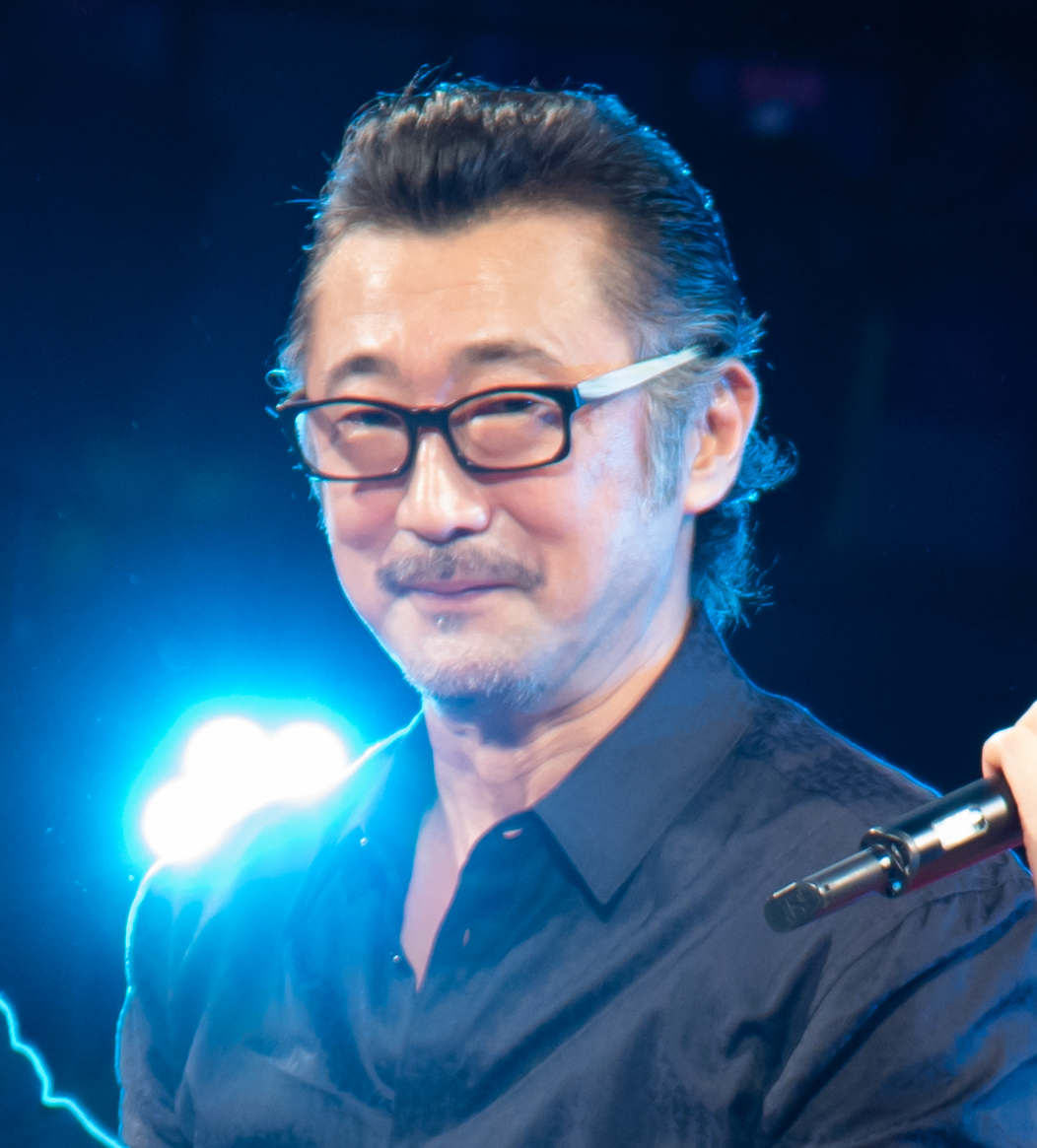
Akio Ōtsuka, Japanese actor and voice actor

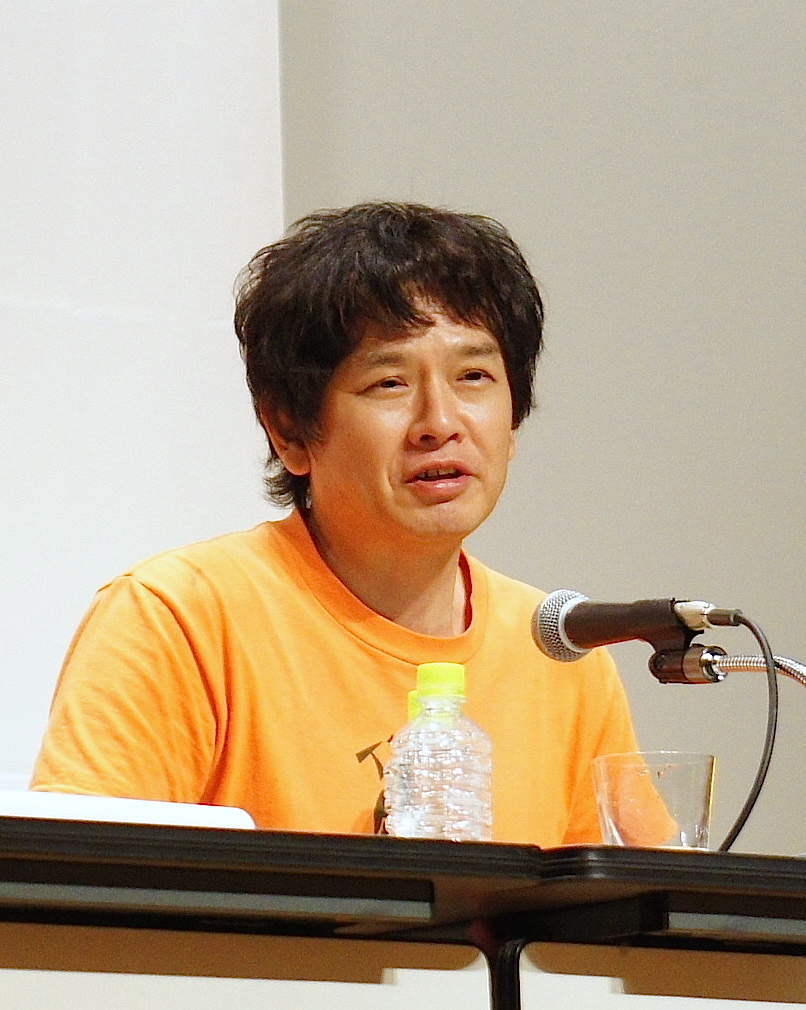
Yoshitomo Nara, Japanese artist

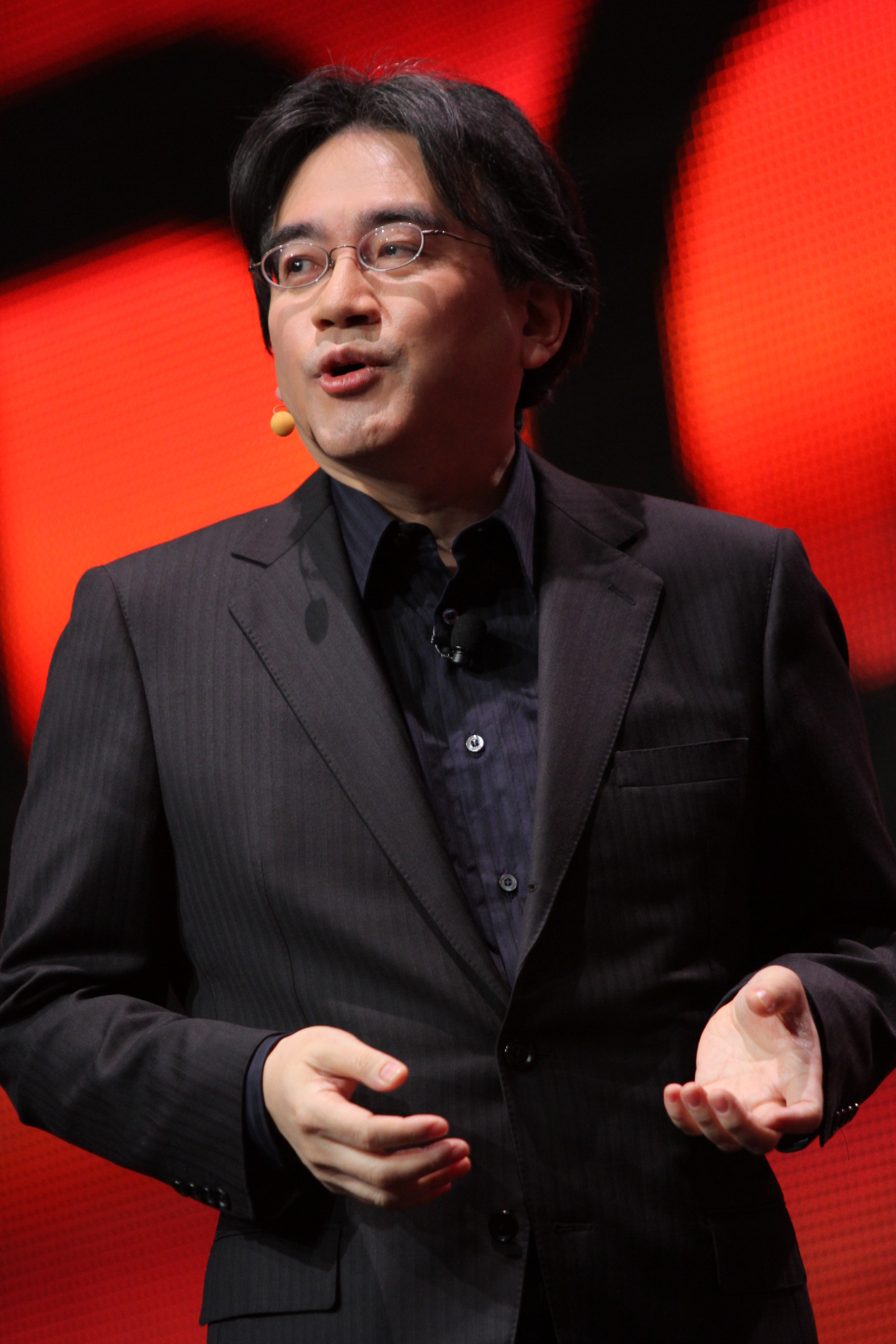
Satoru Iwata, Japanese video game designer and developer, businessman, and president and CEO of Nintendo

Many notable Japanese individuals from Young Japanese Baby Boom/Danso Generation were born in 1959, such as Kimiko Ikegami, Momoe Yamaguchi, Amy Yamada, Yasuharu Konishi, former Japanese Defense Minister Tomomi Inada, Nobel Prize-winning physicist Takaaki Kajita, Kazue Ikura, Satsuki Katayama, Michiru Shimada, Ryuta Kawashima, Takeshi Kobayashi, Kazuki Yao, Nagisa Katahira, Kiyotaka Sugiyama, Koichi Tanaka, Keita Amemiya, Tetsuya Nakashima, Saeko Shimazu, Denny Tamaki, Ken Watanabe, Misako Tanaka, Akio Ōtsuka, Miki Matsubara, Yoshitomo Nara, and Nintendo president and CEO Satoru Iwata.

=== January–March ===
- January 3 – Dankan, actor and director
- January 5 – Kyoichi Katayama, writer
- January 16 – Kimiko Ikegami, American-born Japanese actress
- January 17 – Momoe Yamaguchi, actress
- February 2 – Amy Yamada, writer
- February 3 – Yasuharu Konishi, musician, composer, and DJ
- February 12 – Nana Okada, actress and idol musician
- February 20 – Tomomi Inada, politician and former Minister of Defense
- March 9 – Takaaki Kajita, Nobel Prize-winning physicist
- March 23 – Kazue Ikura, actress, voice actress, and narrator

=== April–June ===
- April 1 – Nobuo Kishi, politician, former Minister of Defense, and the brother of former Japanese Prime Minister Shinzo Abe
- April 7 – Nobuyuki Azuma, fencer
- April 8 – Yoshihito Miyazaki, retired international table tennis player
- April 22 – Fumiko Furuhashi, retired professional tennis player
- April 23 – Akihiro Iwashima, former volleyball player
- May 9 – Satsuki Katayama, politician and Minister of Finance
- May 19 – Michiru Shimada, screenwriter (d. 2017)
- May 23 – Ryuta Kawashima, neuroscientist
- June 7 – Takeshi Kobayashi, keyboardist, lyricist, composer, arranger, and record producer
- June 17 – Kazuki Yao, actor and voice actor

=== July–September ===
- July 12 – Nagisa Katahira, actress and singer
- July 17 – Kiyotaka Sugiyama, singer-songwriter
- August 3 – Koichi Tanaka, electrical engineer
- August 11 – Yoshiaki Murakami, investor
- August 17 – Chika Sakamoto, voice actress
- August 24 – Keita Amemiya, film director and screenwriter
- September 2 – Tetsuya Nakashima, film director and screenwriter
- September 8 – Saeko Shimazu, actress, voice actress, and narrator

=== October–December ===
- October 13 – Denny Tamaki, governor of Okinawa Prefecture
- October 21 – Ken Watanabe, actor
- November 11 – Misako Tanaka, actress
- November 21 – Naoko Watanabe, voice actress
- November 24 – Akio Ōtsuka, actor and voice actor
- November 28 – Miki Matsubara, musician and television presenter (d. 2004)
- December 5 – Yoshitomo Nara, artist
- December 6 – Satoru Iwata, video game designer and developer, businessman, and president and CEO of Nintendo (d. 2015)

== Deaths ==
- March 7 – Ichirō Hatoyama, politician and 35th Prime Minister of Japan (b. 1883)
- April 30 – Kafū Nagai, author, playwright, essayist, and diarist (b. 1879)
- June 20 – Hitoshi Ashida, politician and 35th Prime Minister of Japan (b. 1887)
- August 9 – Noboru Ishizaki, admiral (b. 1893)
