= 1962 in Japan =

- Decades: 1940s; 1950s; 1960s; 1970s; 1980s
- See also: Other events of 1962; History of Japan • Timeline • Years

Events in the year 1962 in Japan.

== Incumbents ==
- Emperor: Hirohito
- Prime minister: Hayato Ikeda (Liberal Democratic)
- Chief Cabinet Secretary: Masayoshi Ōhira until July 18, Yasumi Kurogane
- Chief Justice of the Supreme Court: Kisaburo Yokota
- President of the House of Representatives: Ichirō Kiyose
- President of the House of Councillors: Tsuruhei Matsuno until August 6, Yūzō Shigemune

=== Governors ===
- Aichi Prefecture: Mikine Kuwahara
- Akita Prefecture: Yūjirō Obata
- Aomori Prefecture: Iwao Yamazaki
- Chiba Prefecture: Hitoshi Shibata (until 2 November); Hisaaki Kano (starting 2 November)
- Ehime Prefecture: Sadatake Hisamatsu
- Fukui Prefecture: Eizō Kita
- Fukuoka Prefecture: Taichi Uzaki
- Fukushima Prefecture: Zenichiro Satō
- Gifu Prefecture: Yukiyasu Matsuno
- Gunma Prefecture: Konroku Kanda
- Hiroshima Prefecture: Hiroo Ōhara (until 13 April); Iduo Nagano (starting 29 May)
- Hokkaido: Kingo Machimura
- Hyogo Prefecture: Masaru Sakamoto (until 6 October); Motohiko Kanai (starting 24 November)
- Ibaraki Prefecture: Nirō Iwakami
- Ishikawa Prefecture: Jūjitsu Taya
- Iwate Prefecture: Senichi Abe
- Kagawa Prefecture: Masanori Kaneko
- Kagoshima Prefecture: Katsushi Terazono
- Kanagawa Prefecture: Iwataro Uchiyama
- Kochi Prefecture: Masumi Mizobuchi
- Kumamoto Prefecture: Kōsaku Teramoto
- Kyoto Prefecture: Torazō Ninagawa
- Mie Prefecture: Satoru Tanaka
- Miyagi Prefecture: Yoshio Miura
- Miyazaki Prefecture: Hiroshi Kuroki
- Nagano Prefecture: Gon'ichirō Nishizawa
- Nagasaki Prefecture: Katsuya Sato
- Nara Prefecture: Ryozo Okuda
- Niigata Prefecture: Juichiro Tsukada
- Oita Prefecture: Kaoru Kinoshita
- Okayama Prefecture: Yukiharu Miki
- Osaka Prefecture: Gisen Satō
- Saga Prefecture: Sunao Ikeda
- Saitama Prefecture: Hiroshi Kurihara
- Shiga Prefecture: Kyujiro Taniguchi
- Shiname Prefecture: Choemon Tanabe
- Shizuoka Prefecture: Toshio Saitō
- Tochigi Prefecture: Nobuo Yokokawa
- Tokushima Prefecture: Kikutaro Hara
- Tokyo: Ryōtarō Azuma
- Tottori Prefecture: Jirō Ishiba
- Toyama Prefecture: Minoru Yoshida
- Wakayama Prefecture: Shinji Ono
- Yamagata Prefecture: Tōkichi Abiko
- Yamaguchi Prefecture: Masayuki Hashimoto
- Yamanashi Prefecture: Hisashi Amano

== Events ==
- May 3 – Mikawashima train crash – A freight train and two passenger trains collide near Mikawashima Station in Arakawa, Tokyo, resulting in 160 deaths.
- May 17 – Dainippon Sumitomo Pharma halts the sale of the drug Thalidomide.
- May 29 – Tobu Department Store in Tokyo-Ikebukuro was open.
- November 9 – An All Nippon Airways Vickers Viscount plane crashes in Aichi Prefecture while en route to Nagoya Airport, killing all 4 occupants of the aircraft.
- November 18 – Two tankers, the smaller Munakata Maru 1 owned by Idemitsu Kosan and the larger Thrard Brovig, collide in the Keihin canal in Kawasaki City, Kanagawa Prefecture, causing the deaths of 40 crew members from both ships.
- Unknown Date – Kotobuki Foods, as predecessor of Skylark (すかいらーく) Restaurant founded in Nishitokyo, Tokyo.

== Births ==
- January 20
  - IKKO, make-up artist
  - Sakiko Tamagawa, voice actress
- February 1 – Takashi Murakami, pop artist
- February 25 – Junko Ogata, serial killer
- March 10 – Seiko Matsuda, pop singer/songwriter
- March 13 – Shoko Sawada, singer-songwriter
- March 18 – Kazuhiro Mizoguchi, javelin thrower
- March 30 – Yōko Ogawa, writer
- April 12 – Nobuhiko Takada, mixed martial arts fighter and professional wrestler
- April 30 – Seiji Maehara, politician
- May 5 – Kaoru Wada, composer
- May 31 – Noriko Hidaka, voice actress
- June 10 – Akie Abe, radio DJ
- June 11 – Toshihiko Seki, voice actor
- June 18 – Mitsuharu Misawa, professional wrestler (d. 2009)
- July 19 – Aya Kitō, writer (d. 1988)
- August 8 – Yūji Machi, voice actor
- August 21 – Tsutomu Miyazaki, serial killer (d. 2008)
- September 4 – Shinya Yamanaka, physician and researcher
- September 13 – Hisao Egawa, voice actor
- October 12 – Ko Matsushita, conductor
- October 15 – Yasutoshi Nishimura, politician
- October 21 – Miki Itō, voice actress
- October 27 – Jun'ichi Kanemaru, voice actor
- November 14 – Atsuko Tanaka, voice actress (d. 2024)
- November 27 – Marumi Shiraishi, actress
- December 1 – Shozo Hayashiya IX, rakugoka, tarento and voice actor
- December 23 – Keiji Mutoh, professional wrestler

== Deaths ==
- January 20 – Shizue Tatsuta, film actor (b. 1903).
- September 7 – Eiji Yoshikawa, writer and novelist (b. 1892)
- October 21 – Kinnosuke Ogura, mathematician, historian of mathematics (b. 1885)

== See also ==
- List of Japanese films of 1962
- 1962 in Japanese music
