= 1958 in Japan =

- Decades: 1930s; 1940s; 1950s; 1960s; 1970s
- See also: Other events of 1958: History of Japan; Timeline; Years

Events in the year 1958 in Japan. It corresponds to Shōwa 33 (昭和33年) in the Japanese calendar.

== Incumbents ==
- Emperor: Hirohito
- Prime minister: Nobusuke Kishi
- Chief Cabinet Secretary: Kiichi Aichi until June 12, Munenori Akagi
- Chief Justice of the Supreme Court: Kōtarō Tanaka
- President of the House of Representatives: Shūji Masutani until April 25, Nirō Hoshijima from June 11 until December 13, Ryōgorō Katō
- President of the House of Councillors: Tsuruhei Matsuno

=== Governors ===
- Aichi Prefecture: Mikine Kuwahara
- Akita Prefecture: Yūjirō Obata
- Aomori Prefecture: Iwao Yamazaki
- Chiba Prefecture: Hitoshi Shibata
- Ehime Prefecture: Sadatake Hisamatsu
- Fukui Prefecture: Seiichi Hane
- Fukuoka Prefecture: Taichi Uzaki
- Fukushima Prefecture: Zenichiro Satō
- Gifu Prefecture: Kamon Muto (until 16 October); Yukiyasu Matsuno (starting 17 October)
- Gunma Prefecture: Toshizo Takekoshi
- Hiroshima Prefecture: Hiroo Ōhara
- Hokkaido: Toshifumi Tanaka
- Hyogo Prefecture: Masaru Sakamoto
- Ibaraki Prefecture: Yoji Tomosue
- Ishikawa Prefecture: Jūjitsu Taya
- Iwate Prefecture: Senichi Abe
- Kagawa Prefecture: Masanori Kaneko
- Kagoshima Prefecture: Katsushi Terazono
- Kanagawa Prefecture: Iwataro Uchiyama
- Kochi Prefecture: Masumi Mizobuchi
- Kumamoto Prefecture: Saburō Sakurai
- Kyoto Prefecture: Torazō Ninagawa
- Mie Prefecture: Satoru Tanaka
- Miyagi Prefecture: Yasushi Onuma
- Miyazaki Prefecture: Jingo Futami
- Nagano Prefecture: Torao Hayashi
- Nagasaki Prefecture: Takejirō Nishioka (until 14 January); Katsuya Sato (starting 2 March)
- Nara Prefecture: Ryozo Okuda
- Niigata Prefecture: Kazuo Kitamura
- Oita Prefecture: Kaoru Kinoshita
- Okayama Prefecture: Yukiharu Miki
- Osaka Prefecture: Bunzō Akama
- Saga Prefecture: Naotsugu Nabeshima
- Saitama Prefecture: Hiroshi Kurihara
- Shiga Prefecture: Kotaro Mori (until 6 December); Kyujiro Taniguchi (starting 7 December)
- Shiname Prefecture: Yasuo Tsunematsu
- Shizuoka Prefecture: Toshio Saitō
- Tochigi Prefecture: Kiichi Ogawa
- Tokushima Prefecture: Kikutaro Hara
- Tokyo: Seiichirō Yasui
- Tottori Prefecture: Shigeru Endo (until 10 November); Jirō Ishiba (starting 3 December)
- Toyama Prefecture: Minoru Yoshida
- Wakayama Prefecture: Shinji Ono
- Yamagata Prefecture: Tōkichi Abiko
- Yamaguchi Prefecture: Taro Ozawa
- Yamanashi Prefecture: Hisashi Amano

== Events ==
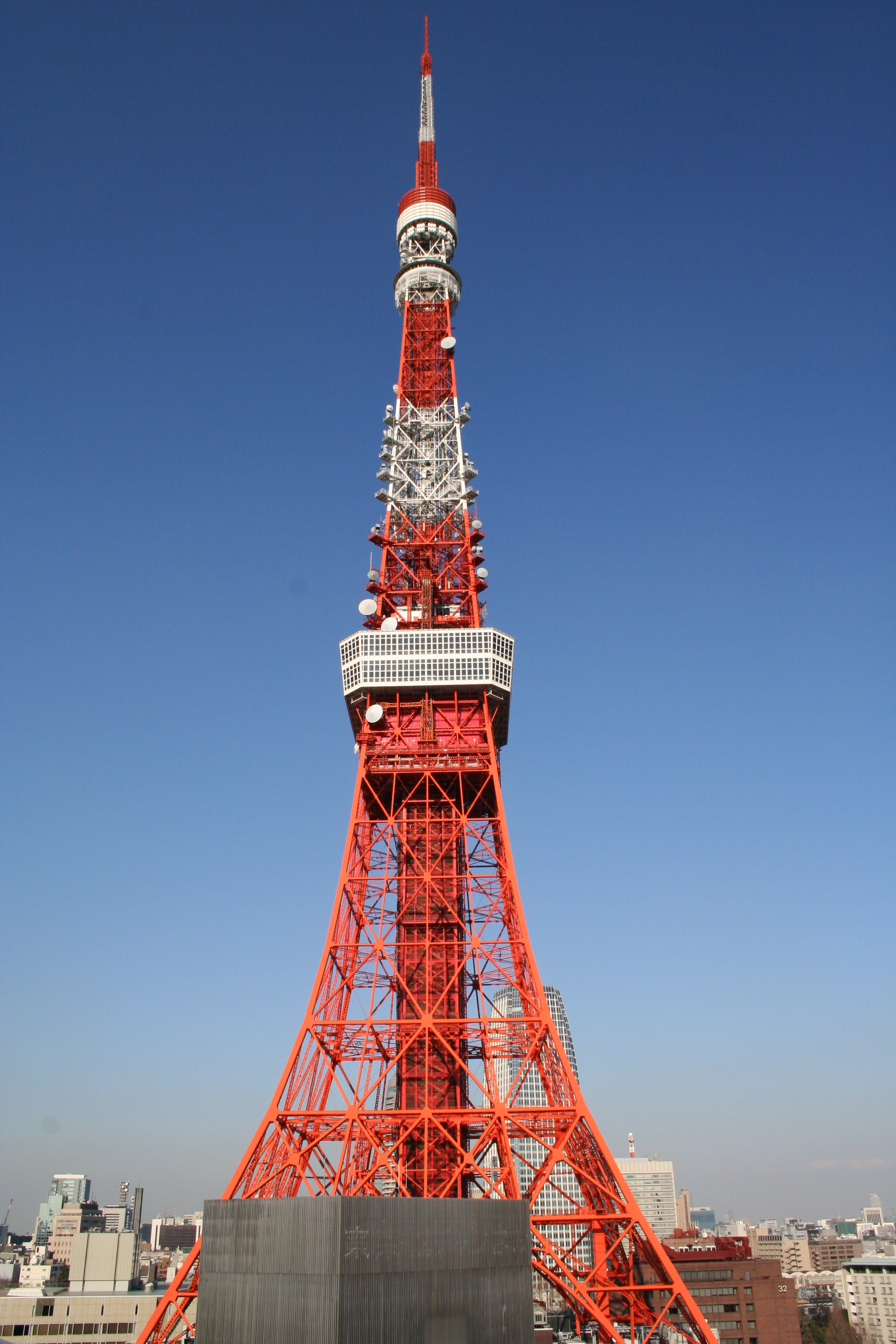
Tokyo Tower is opened to the public for the first time.

- January 26 – According to Japan Coast Guard official confirmed report, a passenger ferry Nankai Maru capsized Kii Channel, between Wakayama City to Tokushima City, total 167 persons drowned.
- March 1 – Two medium-size airlines, FarEastern Airways of Japan and Nippon Helicopter Transport, are merged to become All Nippon Airways (ANA) which begins operation in Japan.
- March 9 – The Kanmon Tunnel opens, connecting Honshu and Kyushu by road for the first time.
- April Unknown date – Ohyama Blow Manufacturing, as predecessor of Iris Ohyama was founded.
- May 2 – Nagasaki Flag incident – Ultra-nationalists pull down a Chinese flag hanging outside an exhibition of postage stamps in Nagasaki, freezing relations between China and Japan.
- May 22 – General election of 1958 – The Liberal Democratic Party win 298 out of 467 seats.
- June 24 – According to official Japanese government confirmed report, a large scale eruption in Mount Aso, Kumamoto Prefecture, killed a total of twelve persons, and wounded 28.
- August 2 – An All Nippon Airways Douglas DC-3 plunges in the sea close to the Izu Islands, killing all 33 occupants of the aircraft.
- August 25 – Instant noodles go on sale for the first time in Japan.
- September 27 – Typhoon Ida kills at least 1,269 in Honshu.
- October 14 – Construction of Tokyo Tower is completed.
- November 10 – According to Japan Meteorological Agency official confirmed report, a large scale erupted in Mount Asama, Gunma Prefecture, ash height maximum 8,000 meters.
- December 23 – Tokyo Tower is opened to the public for the first time, at a final cost of ¥2.8 billion ($8.4 million in 1958).
- December 27 – National Health Care Act of 1958.
- unknown date – Japanese 10 yen coin ceases having serrated edges after a 5-year period beginning in 1953. All 10 yen coins since have smooth edges.

== Births ==
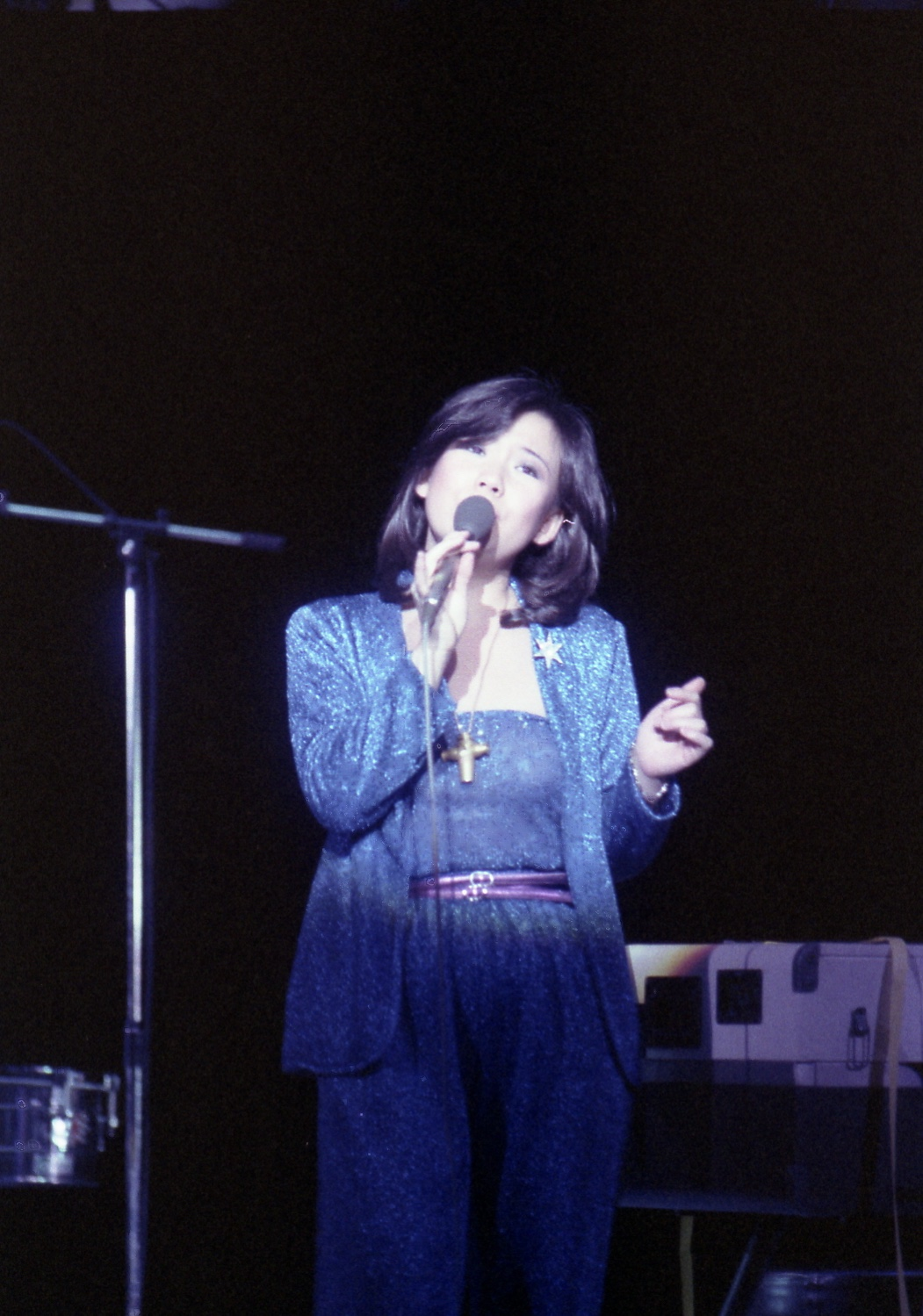
Junko Yagami, Japanese musician and singer-songwriter

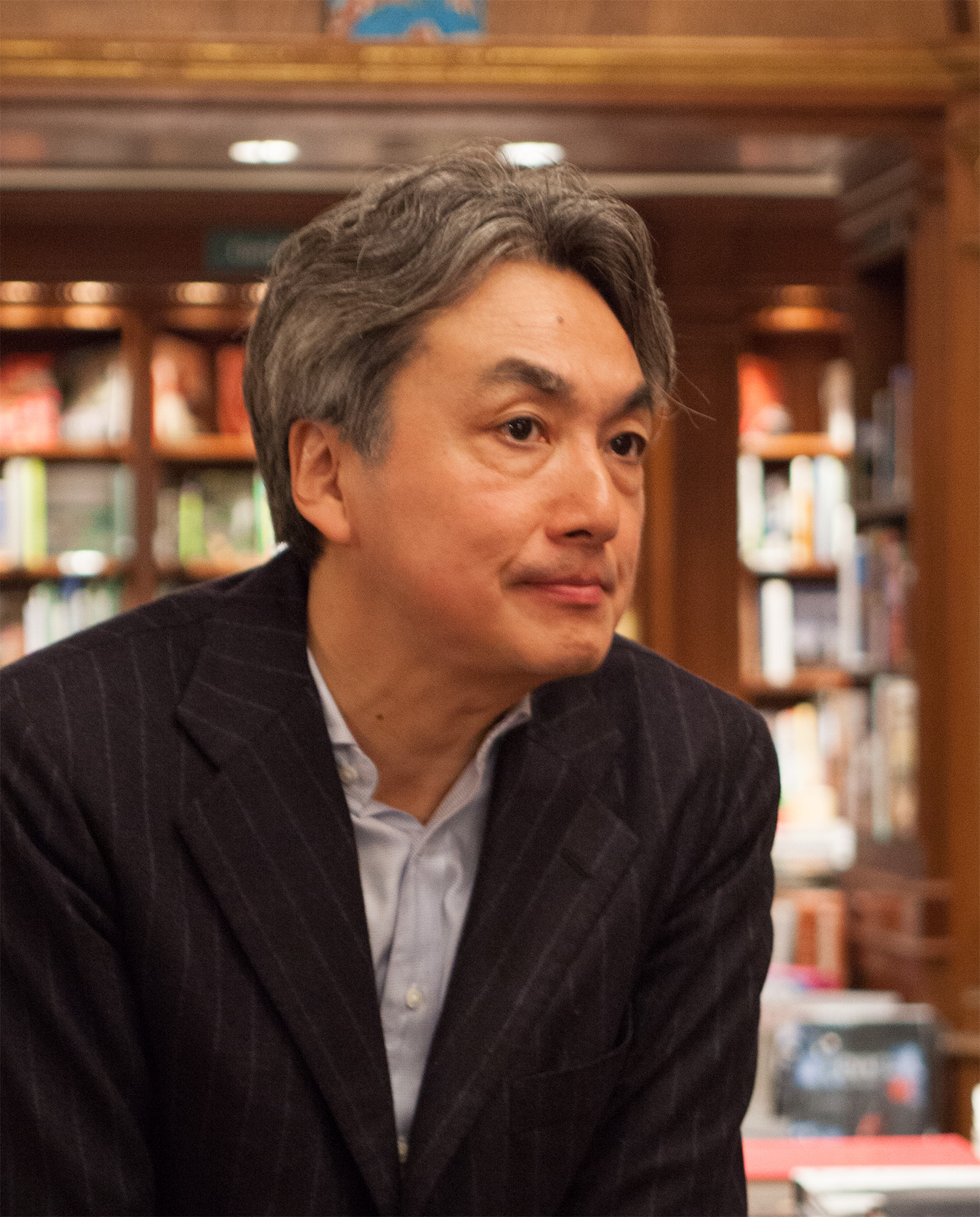
Hiroshi Senju, Japanese Nihonga artist

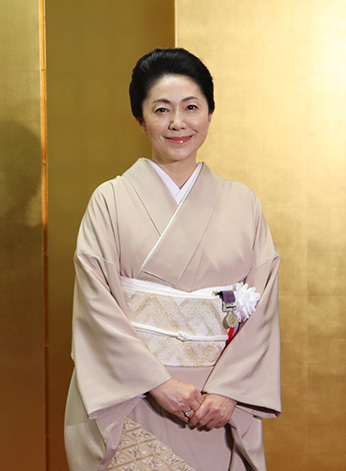
Sayuri Ishikawa, Japanese enka musician and singer-songwriter

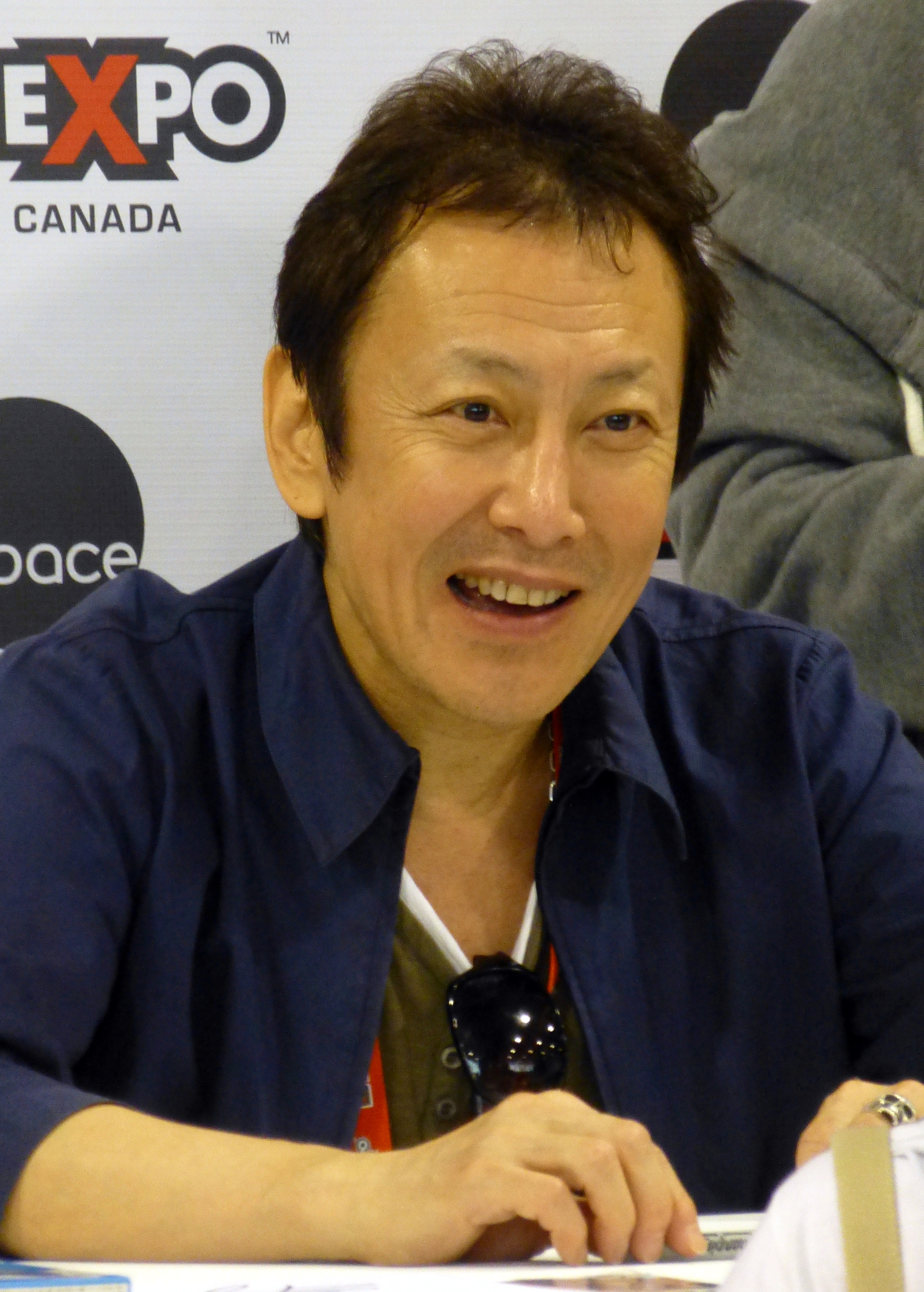
Ryō Horikawa, actor and voice actor

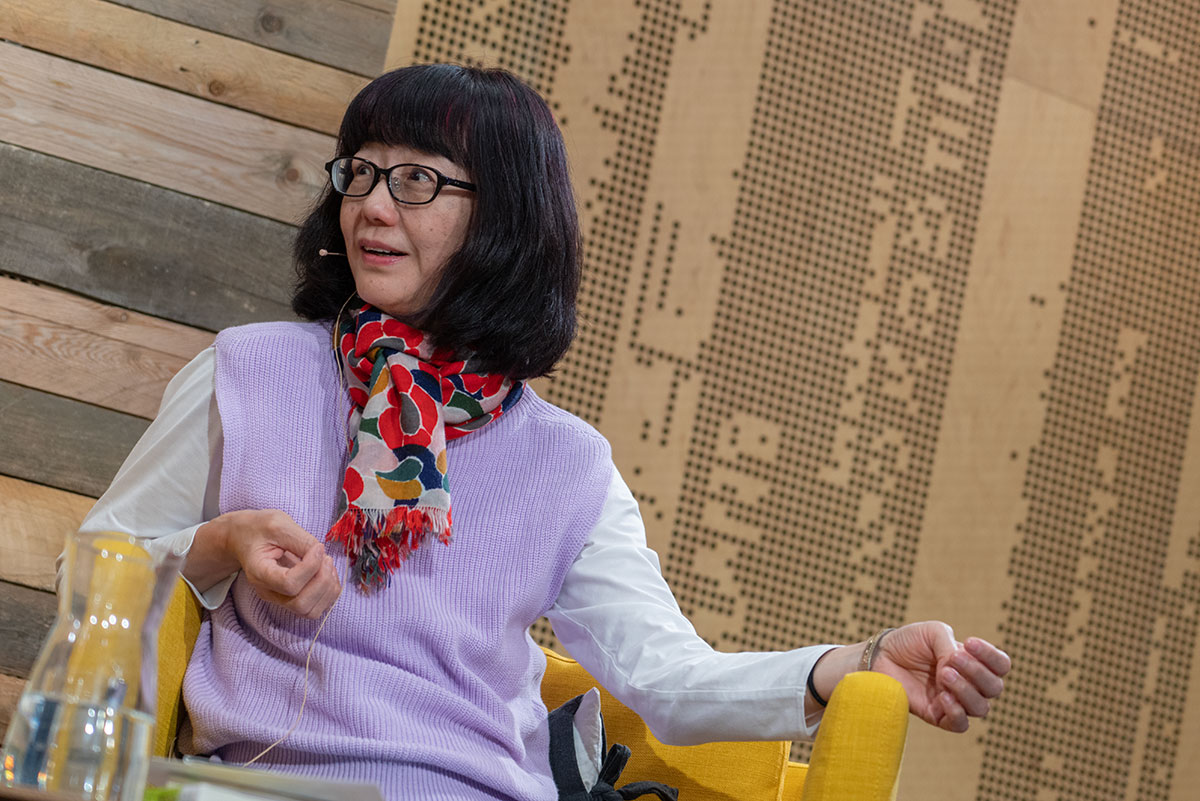
Hiromi Kawakami, Japanese writer

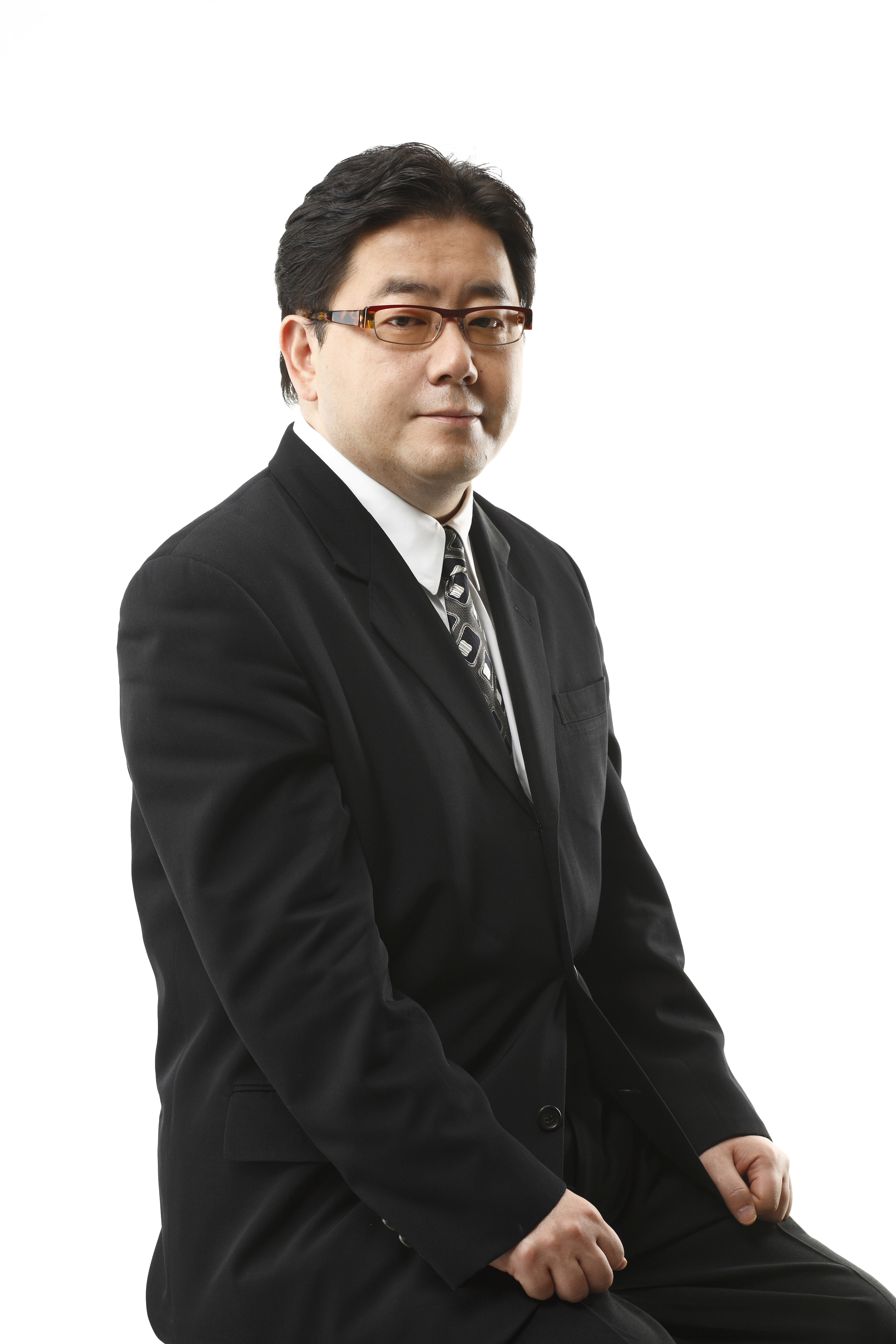
Yasushi Akimoto, Japanese music record producer, lyricist, and television writer

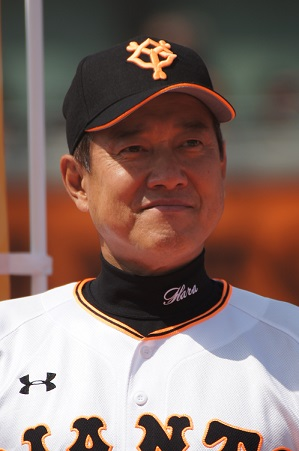
Tatsunori Hara, Japanese professional baseball coach, manager, and former player

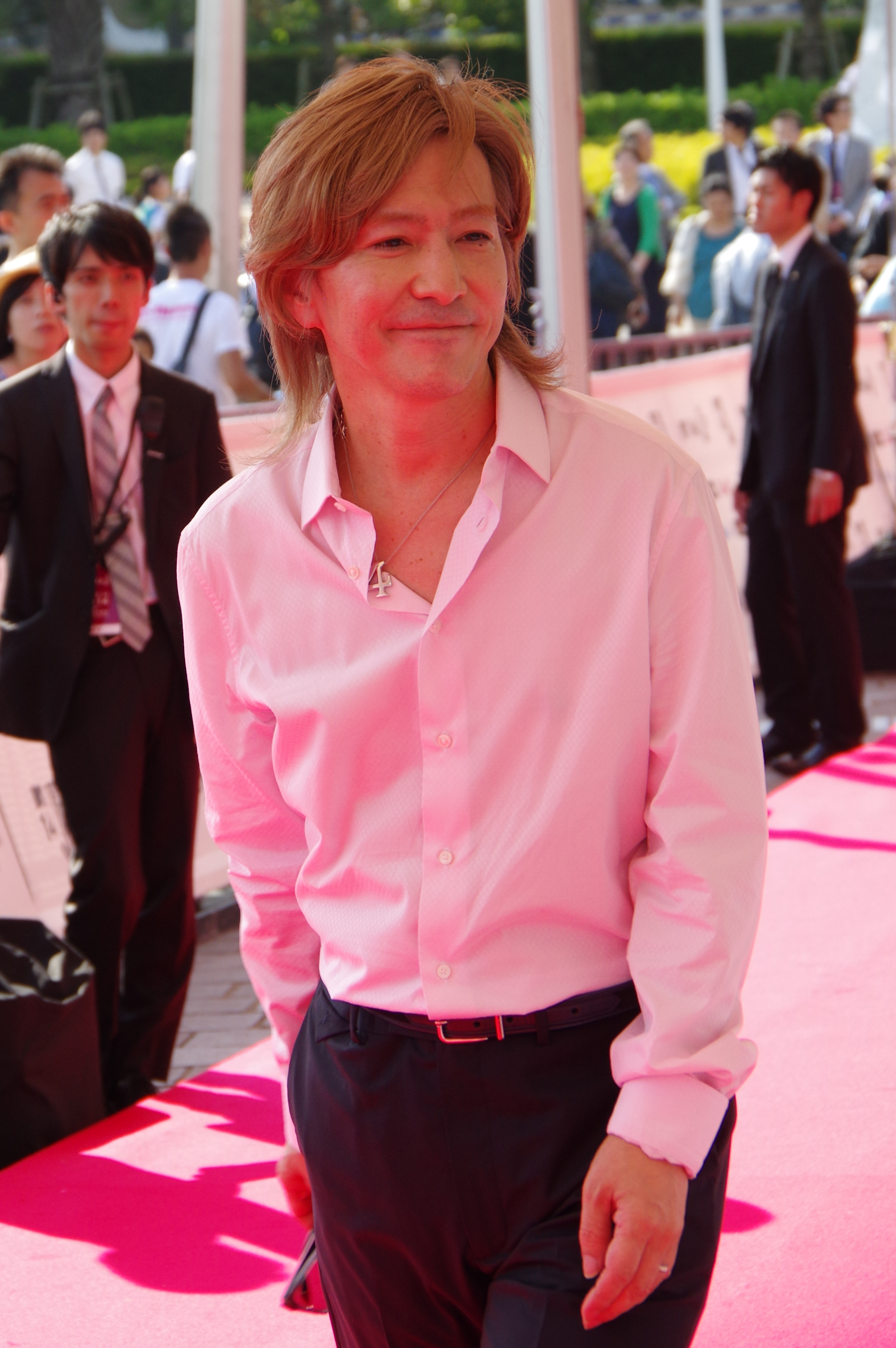
Tetsuya Komuro, Japanese music producer and songwriter

Many notable Japanese individuals from Young Japanese Baby Boom/Danso Generation were born in 1958, such as Junko Yagami, Hiroshi Senju, Sayuri Ishikawa, Ryō Horikawa, Keigo Higashino, Saburō Tokitō, Shinobu Satouchi, Kazuko Kato, Aska, Mitsuyo Nemoto, Tetsuro Oda, Hiromi Kawakami, Shinobu Adachi, Hyōichi Kōno, Crayon Shin-chan creator Yoshito Usui, Yasushi Akimoto, Saki Kubota, Toshio Ōhi, Toshio Okada, Tatsunori Hara, Sho Hayami, Minoru Kawasaki, Tatsuya Maeda, Eiji Otsuka, Mitsuru Miyamoto, Koji Tamaki, Mitsutoshi Tanaka, Masahiro Morioka, Junji Sakamoto, Masato Nakamura, Satoko Fujii, Masako Katsuki, Isao Kikuchi, Hiromi Iwasaki, Ako Mayama, Yoshi Sako, Tetsuya Komuro, Mina Asami, Kanako Higuchi, and Mieko Harada.

=== January–March ===
- January 5 – Junko Yagami, musician and singer-songwriter
- January 7 – Hiroshi Senju, Nihonga artist
- January 20 – Masuo Amada, voice actor
- January 30 – Sayuri Ishikawa, enka singer
- February 1 – Ryō Horikawa, actor and voice actor
- February 4
  - Keigo Higashino, writer
  - Saburō Tokitō, singer and actor
- February 11 – Shinobu Satouchi, voice actor
- February 20 – Kazuko Kato, actress, woman talent, and TV presenter
- February 24 – Aska, singer
- March 1 – Noritoshi Hirata, former Olympic gymnast
- March 7 – Tomohiro Maruyama, professional golfer
- March 9 – Mitsuyo Nemoto, actress and musician
- March 10 – Hiroshi Yanaka, voice actor
- March 11 – Tetsuro Oda, composer and record producer
- March 14 – Nobuhiro Ishizaki, football player and manager of Matsumoto Yamaga FC
- March 16 – Shuji Kira, politician

=== April–June ===
- April 1 – Hiromi Kawakami, author and writer
- April 7 – Shinobu Adachi, actress, voice actress, and narrator
- April 12 – Hyōichi Kōno, adventurer (d. 2001)
- April 21
  - Michiko Ueno, politician
  - Yoshito Usui, creator of Crayon Shin-chan (d. 2009)
- May 2 – Yasushi Akimoto, record producer, lyricist and television writer
- May 11 – Sayuri Kume, singer-songwriter
- June 8 – Toshio Ōhi, potter, ceramic artist, and the son of Chōzaemon Ōhi
- June 14 – Masami Yoshida, javelin thrower (d. 2000)
- June 20 – Teiyū Ichiryūsai, voice actress

=== July–September ===
- July 1 – Toshio Okada, anime producer, writer, and lecturer
- July 5 – Kyoko Terase, voice actress
- July 22 – Tatsunori Hara, professional baseball coach, manager, and former player
- August 2 – Shō Hayami, actor, voice actor, and singer
- August 15
  - Chiharu Suzuka, voice actress
  - Minoru Kawasaki, film director
  - Rieko Matsuura, writer and short story writer
- August 22 – Tatsuya Maeda, musician
- August 27
  - Hachiro Nitta, politician
  - Yoshinori Mizumaki, professional golfer
- August 28 – Eiji Otsuka, social critic, folklorist, media theorist, and writer
- September 8
  - Mitsuru Miyamoto, voice actor
  - Reiko Terashima, manga artist and illustrator
- September 13 – Koji Tamaki, musician and actor
- September 24 – Mitsutoshi Tanaka, film and commercial director
- September 25 – Masahiro Morioka, philosopher

=== October–December ===
- October 1
  - Junji Sakamoto, film director
  - Masato Nakamura, musician and bassist
- October 9 – Satoko Fujii, jazz musician and pianist
- October 15 – Masako Katsuki, voice actress
- October 23 – Hiroyuki Kinoshita, actor and voice actor
- October 24 – Hatsuhiko Tsuji, professional baseball coach and former player
- November 1 – Isao Kikuchi, prelate and Archbishop of Tokyo
- November 12 – Hiromi Iwasaki, singer
- November 15
  - Ako Mayama, voice actress
  - Yoshi Sako, actor
- November 20 – Hatsune Ishihara, actress
- November 27 – Tetsuya Komuro, music producer and songwriter
- December 2 – Mina Asami, actress
- December 13 – Kanako Higuchi, actress
- December 24 – Munetaka Higuchi, musician and record producer (d. 2008)
- December 26 – Mieko Harada, actress

=== Unknown Date ===
- Junko Sakurada, actress, singer, and a former member of Unification Church
- Kayoko Sakamoto, visual artist
- Yoshiki Hishinuma, fashion designer
- Yoshiteru Otani, cartoonist

== Deaths ==
- April 2 – Jōsei Toda, educator and peace activist (b. 1900)
- September 20 – Ogasawara Naganari, admiral and naval strategist (b. 1867)

== See also ==
- List of Japanese films of 1958
