= 1961 in Japan =

- Decades: 1940s; 1950s; 1960s; 1970s; 1980s
- See also: Other events of 1961; History of Japan • Timeline • Years

Events in the year 1961 in Japan. It corresponds to Shōwa 36 (昭和36年) in the Japanese calendar.

Demographically, Shinjinrui Generation is the second youngest Japanese demographic cohort, which approximately born between 1961 and 1969. Many young Japanese who were born around this first date were often subsequently identified as "Shinjinrui" (new breed of humans) because they did not experience the suffering of older generations during the Asia-Pacific War, World War II and/or post-war period. They grew up in a time of plenty at the end of the Japanese economic miracle and the beginning of economic stagnation. The term was coined by anthropologist Shinichiro Kurimoto. This Japanese generation was seen as having a different mindset compared to their predecessors, influenced by the Japanese economic boom and changing societal norms.

== Incumbents ==
- Emperor: Hirohito
- Prime minister: Hayato Ikeda (Liberal Democratic)

=== Governors ===
- Aichi Prefecture: Mikine Kuwahara
- Akita Prefecture: Yūjirō Obata
- Aomori Prefecture: Iwao Yamazaki
- Chiba Prefecture: Hitoshi Shibata
- Ehime Prefecture: Sadatake Hisamatsu
- Fukui Prefecture: Eizō Kita
- Fukuoka Prefecture: Taichi Uzaki
- Fukushima Prefecture: Zenichiro Satō
- Gifu Prefecture: Yukiyasu Matsuno
- Gunma Prefecture: Konroku Kanda
- Hiroshima Prefecture: Hiroo Ōhara
- Hokkaido: Kingo Machimura
- Hyogo Prefecture: Masaru Sakamoto
- Ibaraki Prefecture: Nirō Iwakami
- Ishikawa Prefecture: Jūjitsu Taya
- Iwate Prefecture: Senichi Abe
- Kagawa Prefecture: Masanori Kaneko
- Kagoshima Prefecture: Katsushi Terazono
- Kanagawa Prefecture: Iwataro Uchiyama
- Kochi Prefecture: Masumi Mizobuchi
- Kumamoto Prefecture: Kōsaku Teramoto
- Kyoto Prefecture: Torazō Ninagawa
- Mie Prefecture: Satoru Tanaka
- Miyagi Prefecture: Yoshio Miura
- Miyazaki Prefecture: Hiroshi Kuroki
- Nagano Prefecture: Gon'ichirō Nishizawa
- Nagasaki Prefecture: Katsuya Sato
- Nara Prefecture: Ryozo Okuda
- Niigata Prefecture: Kazuo Kitamura (until 30 November); Juichiro Tsukada (starting 10 December)
- Oita Prefecture: Kaoru Kinoshita
- Okayama Prefecture: Yukiharu Miki
- Osaka Prefecture: Gisen Satō
- Saga Prefecture: Sunao Ikeda
- Saitama Prefecture: Hiroshi Kurihara
- Shiga Prefecture: Kyujiro Taniguchi
- Shiname Prefecture: Choemon Tanabe
- Shizuoka Prefecture: Toshio Saitō
- Tochigi Prefecture: Nobuo Yokokawa
- Tokushima Prefecture: Kikutaro Hara
- Tokyo: Ryōtarō Azuma
- Tottori Prefecture: Jirō Ishiba
- Toyama Prefecture: Minoru Yoshida
- Wakayama Prefecture: Shinji Ono
- Yamagata Prefecture: Tōkichi Abiko
- Yamaguchi Prefecture: Masayuki Hashimoto
- Yamanashi Prefecture: Hisashi Amano

== Events ==
- January unknown date – Credit card brand JCB was founded.
- February 10 – Unicharm was founded.
- June to July – After a long period of torrential rain, cliff collapses and debris flows hit the Tenryū River area, Nagano Prefecture, according to Fire and Disaster Management Agency of Japan, official confirmed report, total 357 fatalities and 1,320 were injured nationwide.
- August 19 – A magnitude 6.8 earthquake hit the border between Fukui, Ishikawa and Gifu Prefecture, according to Fire and Disaster Management Agency official confirmed report, 8 fatalities, 43 were wounded.
- September 17 – A superpower typhoon Nancy hit in western Japan, a storm surge occurred in Osaka Bay area, according to Fire and Disaster Management Agency of Japan, official confirmed report, 202 people lost their lives, 4,974 people were wounded nationwide.
- October 26 – An accident occurred in which a suburban train was involved in a landslide caused by torrential rain and buried in Oita to Beppu line in Oita Prefecture, according to Fire and Disaster Management Agency of Japan, official confirmed report, 31 people lost their lives and 36 people were injured.

== Births ==
- January 3 – Toshirō Yanagiba, actor
- January 31 – Mako Ishino, singer and actress
- February 6 – Yuko Kobayashi, voice actress
- February 28 – Toshihiko Tahara, singer and actor
- March 4 – Atsuko Asano, actress
- March 7 – Sanae Takaichi, Prime Minister of Japan
- March 21 – Hiroshi Jofuku, football coach
- April 21 – Masayuki Imai, actor and playwright (d. 2015)
- April 26 – Hideki Kuriyama, professional baseball coach and former player
- April 29 – Fumihiko Tachiki, voice actor
- May 10 – Ayako Fuji, enka singer
- June 7 – Kaoru Okazaki, former professional baseball player
- June 10 – Yoshiki Okamoto, video game designer
- June 17 – Kōichi Yamadera, voice actor
- July 5 – Eriko Kimura, Japanese director of audiography
- July 8
  - Kōki Mitani, screenwriter
  - Nobue Matsubara, enka singer
- July 14 – Keiko Saito, actress
- July 26 – Keiko Matsui, keyboardist and composer
- August 16 – Urara Takano, voice actress
- September 21 – Yumi Takada, voice actress
- October 4 – Kazuki Takahashi, manga artist, game developer, and creator of Yu-Gi-Oh! (d. 2022)
- October 16 – Yahiro Kazama, former football coach and player
- October 20 – Michie Tomizawa, voice actress and singer
- November 21 – Maria Kawamura, voice actress
- December 19 – Nobuyuki Kagawa, former professional baseball player (d. 2014)
- December 24 – Eriko Kitagawa, screenwriter and director

== Deaths ==
- January 16 – Roppa Furukawa, film actor (b. 1903)
- July 23 – Shigeko Higashikuni, previously "Shigeko, Princess Teru", eldest child of Emperor Shōwa (b. 1925)
- September 21 – Koji Uno, writer (b. 1891)
- October 18 – Tsuru Aoki, actress (b. 1892)

== See also ==
- List of Japanese films of 1961
- 1961 in Japanese music
