= 1887 in Japan =

- Decades: 1860s; 1870s; 1880s; 1890s; 1900s
- See also: Other events of 1887; History of Japan • Timeline • Years

Events in the year 1887 in Japan.

== Incumbents ==
- Monarch: Emperor Meiji
- Prime Minister: Itō Hirobumi

=== Governors ===
- Aichi Prefecture: Minoru Katsumata
- Akita Prefecture: Sada Aoyama
- Aomori Prefecture: Nabeshima Miki
- Ehime Prefecture: Shinpei Seki
- Fukui Prefecture: Tsutomu Ishiguro
- Fukuoka Prefecture: Yasujo
- Fukushima Prefecture: Hiraochi Orita
- Gifu Prefecture: Toshi Kozaki
- Gunma Prefecture: Sato Atasesan
- Hiroshima Prefecture: Senda Sadaaki
- Ibaraki Prefecture: Sadanori Yasuda
- Iwate Prefecture: Shoichiro Ishii
- Kanagawa Prefecture: Baron Tadatsu Hayashi
- Kochi Prefecture: Yoshiaki Tonabe
- Kumamoto Prefecture: Yoshiaki Tonabe
- Kyoto Prefecture: Baron Utsumi Tadakatsu
- Mie Prefecture: Ishii Kuni
- Miyagi Prefecture: Matsudaira Masanao
- Miyazaki Prefecture: Teru Tananbe then Tokito Konkyo then Takayoshi Kyoganu
- Nagano Prefecture: Baron Seiichiro Kinashi
- Niigata Prefecture: Shinozaki Goro
- Oita Prefecture: Ryokichi Nishimura
- Okinawa Prefecture: Sadakiyo Osako then Minoru Fukuhara
- Osaka Prefecture: Tateno Tsuyoshi
- Saga Prefecture: Kamata Kagehisa
- Saitama Prefecture: Kiyohide Yoshida
- Shimane Prefecture: Sukeo Kabayama
- Tochigi Prefecture: Orita Hirauchi
- Tokyo: Marquis Shigeru Hachisuke
- Toyama Prefecture: Fujishima Masaki
- Yamagata Prefecture: Shibahara Sum

== Events ==
- January 22 – Tōkyō Denkō begins selling electric lights.

== Births ==
- February 4 – Masaichi Niimi, admiral (d. 1993)
- February 9 – Tsuchida Bakusen, nihonga painter (d. 1936)
- March 25 – Chūichi Nagumo, admiral (d. 1944)
- July 28 – Tetsu Katayama, politician and 33rd Prime Minister of Japan (d. 1978)
- November 15 – Hitoshi Ashida, politician and 34th Prime Minister of Japan (d. 1959)

== Deaths ==
- December 6 – Shimazu Hisamitsu, samurai (b. 1817)
