= Kōji Kamibayashi =

Kōji Kamibayashi (髪林 孝司, Kamibayashi Kōji; born October 10, 1960 in Sapporo, Japan) is the founder and former CEO of TV Tokyo Broadband. TV Tokyo Broadband, also known as TXBB, went public on the Tokyo Stock Exchange in 2005 (TYO: 3786). The company also was the largest shareholder of InterFM (officially: FM Inter-Wave) in Tokyo, Japan.

== Career ==
As CEO of TXBB, he was responsible for bringing many famous animations such as Peanuts, Snoopy and Woodstock, Teenage Mutant Ninja Turtles, France's Miffy, and Russia's Cheburashka, among others, to Japan. He also revived the fortunes of the children's program Sesame Street when he created a consortium to control the show's fortunes in Japan after NHK dropped it. The consortium soon turned it around and made Sesame Street into a successful program in Japan.
