= Nagisa Katahira =

Japanese actress and singer (born 1959)

- Born: 12 July 1959 (age 66)
- Other name: 片平 なぎさ
- Occupations: Film and television actress and singer
- Known for: Series (Note: Red Dead Wagon series Hôigaku kyôshitsu no jiken file Kagemusha Tokugawa Ieyasu Sotohiro Kâdo G-men Kobayakawa Akane Yonimo kimyô na monogatari: Aki no tokubetsu hen Pretty Girls Tenka Stewardess monogatari, Yokomizo Seishi shirîzu Kuroi fukuin: Shinpu no giwaku Keiji kun Gokinjo tantei satsukino satsuki: Gomi to batsu Hotelier Nurse Aoi: Special Hidarime Tantei EYE Onna kakekomi dera Keiji: Ooishi Mizuho 2 Fukuie keibuho no aisatsu) and Feature films (Note: Aoi sanmyaku Torakku yarô: Dokyô ichiban hoshi Trick: The Movie 2 The Visitor in the Eye and Love Is a Hunter)

Nagisa Katahira (片平 なぎさ, Katahira Nagisa), born 12 July 1959) is a Japanese film and television actress, and singer.

== Acting career ==
She has appeared in such television series and TV movies as the Red Dead Wagon series, Hôigaku kyôshitsu no jiken file, Kagemusha Tokugawa Ieyasu, Sotohiro, Kâdo G-men Kobayakawa Akane, Yonimo kimyô na monogatari: Aki no tokubetsu hen, Pretty Girls, Tenka, Stewardess monogatari, Yokomizo Seishi shirîzu, Kuroi fukuin: Shinpu no giwaku, Keiji kun, Gokinjo tantei satsukino satsuki: Gomi to batsu, Hotelier, Nurse Aoi: Special, Hidarime Tantei EYE, Onna kakekomi dera Keiji: Ooishi Mizuho 2, and Fukuie keibuho no aisatsu. She has appeared in such feature films as Aoi sanmyaku, Torakku yarô: Dokyô ichiban hoshi, Trick: The Movie 2, The Visitor in the Eye and Love Is a Hunter.
