= Akihiro Iwashima =

Japanese volleyball player (born 1959)

Personal information
- Born: 29 April 1959 (age 67)
- Height: 1.83 m (6 ft 0 in)

Volleyball information
- Position: Outside hitter
- Number: 11 (1984); 2 (1988)

National team
1983–1988	Japan
Honours
Men's volleyball
Representing Japan
Goodwill Games
Bronze medal – third place	1986 Moscow

Akihiro Iwashima (岩島 章博, Iwashima Akihiro; born 23 April 1959) is a Japanese former volleyball player who competed at the 1984 Summer Olympics in Los Angeles and the 1988 Summer Olympics in Seoul. Iwashima competed at the 1986 Goodwill Games in Moscow and won a bronze medal.
