= 2008 in Japan =

- Decades: 1980s; 1990s; 2000s; 2010s; 2020s
- See also: Other events of 2008; History of Japan • Timeline • Years

Events in the year 2008 in Japan.

== Incumbents ==
- Emperor: Akihito
- Prime Minister: Yasuo Fukuda (Liberal Democratic Party–Gunma) to September 24 Taro Aso (L–Fukuoka)
- Chief Cabinet Secretary: Nobutaka Machimura (L–Hokkaidō) to September 24 Takeo Kawamura (L–Yamaguchi)
- Chief Justice of the Supreme Court: Nirō Shimada to November 21 Hironobu Takesaki from November 25
- President of the House of Representatives: Yōhei Kōno (L–Kanagawa)
- President of the House of Councillors: Satsuki Eda (D–Okayama)
- Diet sessions: 168th (extraordinary session continued from 2007, to January 15), 169th (regular, January 18 to June 21), 170th (extraordinary, September 24 to December 25)

=== Governors ===
- Aichi Prefecture: Masaaki Kanda
- Akita Prefecture: Sukeshiro Terata
- Aomori Prefecture: Shingo Mimura
- Chiba Prefecture: Akiko Dōmoto
- Ehime Prefecture: Moriyuki Kato
- Fukui Prefecture: Issei Nishikawa
- Fukuoka Prefecture: Wataru Asō
- Fukushima Prefecture: Yūhei Satō
- Gifu Prefecture: Hajime Furuta
- Gunma Prefecture: Masaaki Osawa
- Hiroshima Prefecture: Yūzan Fujita
- Hokkaido: Harumi Takahashi
- Hyogo Prefecture: Toshizō Ido
- Ibaraki Prefecture: Masaru Hashimoto
- Ishikawa Prefecture: Masanori Tanimoto
- Iwate Prefecture: Takuya Tasso
- Kagawa Prefecture: Takeki Manabe
- Kagoshima Prefecture: Satoshi Mitazono
- Kanagawa Prefecture: Shigefumi Matsuzawa
- Kochi Prefecture: Masanao Ozaki
- Kumamoto Prefecture: Yoshiko Shiotani (until 16 April); Ikuo Kabashima (starting 16 April)
- Kyoto Prefecture: Keiji Yamada
- Mie Prefecture: Akihiko Noro
- Miyagi Prefecture: Yoshihiro Murai
- Miyazaki Prefecture: Hideo Higashikokubaru
- Nagano Prefecture: Jin Murai
- Nagasaki Prefecture: Genjirō Kaneko
- Nara Prefecture: Shōgo Arai
- Niigata Prefecture: Hirohiko Izumida
- Oita Prefecture: Katsusada Hirose
- Okayama Prefecture: Masahiro Ishii
- Okinawa Prefecture: Hirokazu Nakaima
- Osaka Prefecture: Fusae Ōta (until 5 February); Tōru Hashimoto (starting 6 February)
- Saga Prefecture: Yasushi Furukawa
- Saitama Prefecture: Kiyoshi Ueda
- Shiga Prefecture: Yukiko Kada
- Shiname Prefecture: Zenbe Mizoguchi
- Shizuoka Prefecture: Yoshinobu Ishikawa
- Tochigi Prefecture: Tomikazu Fukuda
- Tokushima Prefecture: Kamon Iizumi
- Tokyo: Shintarō Ishihara
- Tottori Prefecture: Shinji Hirai
- Toyama Prefecture: Takakazu Ishii
- Wakayama Prefecture: Yoshinobu Nisaka
- Yamagata Prefecture: Hiroshi Saitō
- Yamaguchi Prefecture: Sekinari Nii
- Yamanashi Prefecture: Shōmei Yokouchi

== Events ==
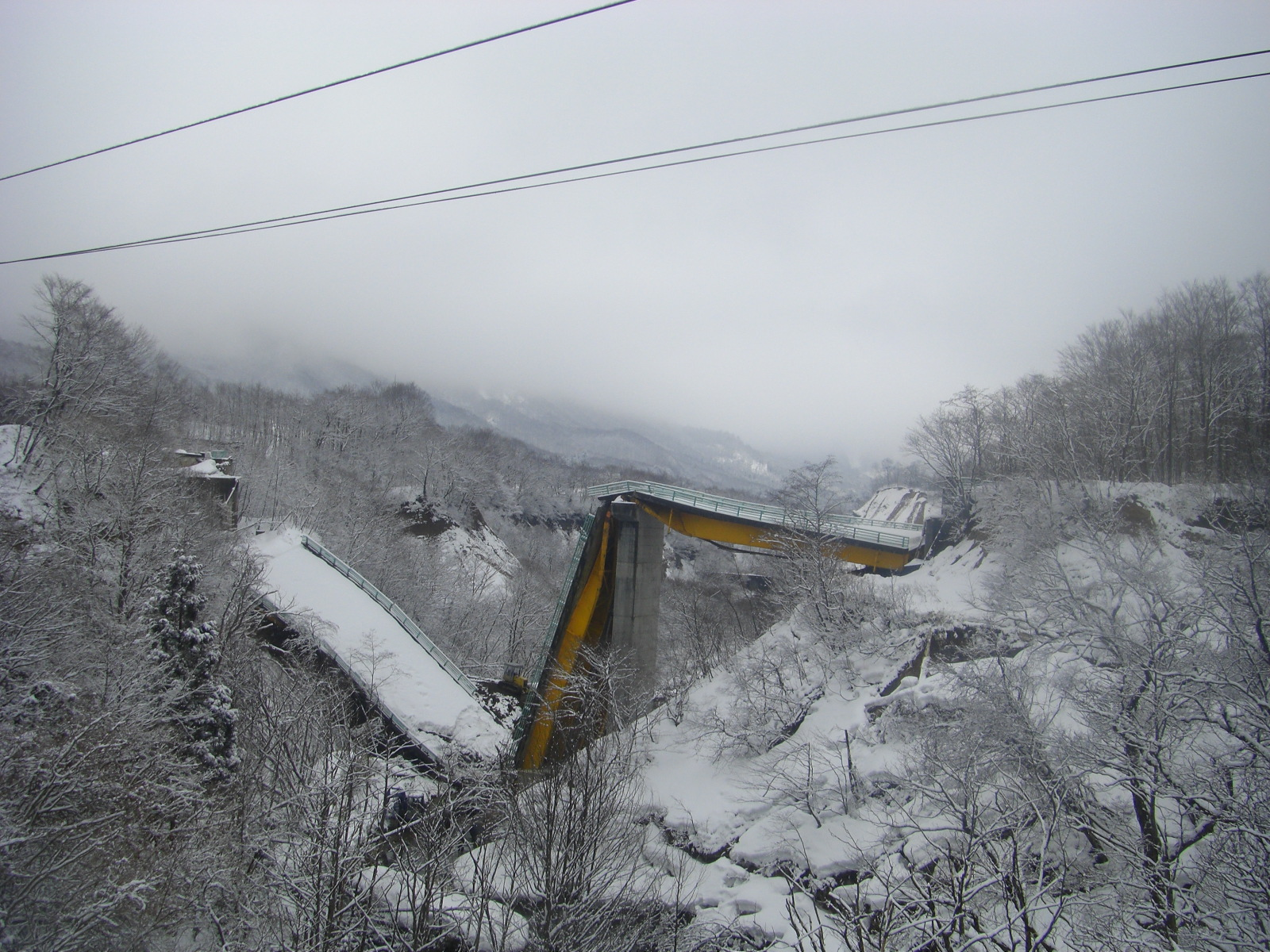
A bridge which collapsed during the 2008 Iwate–Miyagi Nairiku earthquake

- January 31 – Nine people are hospitalized after eating gyōza made at the Tianyang Food Plant in China.
- February 11 – Okinawa police arrest United States Marine Tyrone Hadnott and charge him with raping a middle-school girl.
- February 19
  - Kei Nishikori wins an ATP title. At age 18, he is the youngest player to win the title after Lleyton Hewitt won it at age 16 in 1998.
  - A Japanese Maritime Self-Defense Force destroyer Atago collides with fishing boat Seitoku Maru at 4:07 am, off the coast of Chiba Prefecture.
- February 22
  - The Japan Maritime Self-Defense Force resumes fueling warships from the United States and its allies.
  - Kazuyoshi Miura is arrested in Saipan on suspicion of involvement with the murder of his wife in 1981.
- February 25 – The Supreme Court upheld life sentence of Daisuke Mori.
- June 8 – The Akihabara massacre takes place in Tokyo. A man kills seven in an attack on a crowd using a truck and a dagger.
- June 14 – the 2008 Iwate earthquake strikes northern Honshū, leaving two dead and hundreds injured.
- June 17 – Serial killer Tsutomu Miyazaki is executed by hanging.
- July 7 – July 9 – G8 summit hosted by Japan.
- September 6 – Prime Minister Yasuo Fukuda announces his resignation.
- September 24 – The Diet elects Taro Aso Prime Minister.
- October – Toyota launches yet another Avensis at the 2008 Paris Motor Show to be built in Britain.
- October 1 – Arson claims 15 lives in a pre-dawn fire at an adult-video shop in Osaka.
- October 10 (U.S. Pacific Daylight Time) – Kazuyoshi Miura commits suicide in Los Angeles while under arrest on suspicion of involvement in the murder of his wife.
- October 17 – Japan won their tenth nonpermanent seat for 2009 and 2010 sessions on the United Nations Security Council, defeating Iran by 158 votes to 32 in elections in the General Assembly

== The Nobel Prize ==
- Yoichiro Nambu, Makoto Kobayashi (physicist), Toshihide Maskawa: 2008 Nobel Prize in Physics winners.

== Deaths ==
- January 16: Tamako Kataoka, painter
- January 17: Jinzō Toriumi, screenwriter
- February 13: Kon Ichikawa, film director
- February 29: Kenji Yanagiya, fighter ace of the Imperial Japanese Army
- March 3: Taichirō Hirokawa, voice actor and narrator
- March 11: Akemi Negishi, actress
- April 2: Momoko Ishii, author
- June 6: Saeko Himuro, novelist, essayist, and playwright
- June 9: Kan Mukai, film director, cinematographer, producer and screenwriter
- June 17: Tsutomu Miyazaki, serial killer
- June 18: Miyuki Kanbe, model and actress
- June 27: Daihachi Oguchi, drummer
- August 2: Fujio Akatsuka, manga artist
- August 4: Eri Kawai, singer
- August 11: Arase Nagahide, sumo wrestler
- August 14: Seiji Aochi, ski jumper
- August 16: Masanobu Fukuoka, microbiologist
- October 10: Kazuyoshi Miura, businessman
- October 27: Frank Nagai, singer
- November 7: Hidetaka Nishiyama, master of Shotokan karate
- November 10: Kiyoshi Itō, mathematician
- December 5: Shūichi Katō, critic
- December 16: Ai Iijima, media personality and AV idol
- Undated: Yoshinao Kodaira, officer and fighter ace

== See also ==
- 2008 in Japanese music
- 2008 in Japanese television
- List of Japanese films of 2008
