= Hiroshi Kuroki =

Japanese administrator

- 黒木 博
- Born: 1907; Miyazaki, Japan
- Died: 24 December 2001 (age 94); Miyazaki, Japan

Hiroshi Kuroki (黒木 博, Kuroki Hiroshi; 1907 – 24 December 2001) was a governor of Miyazaki Prefecture in Japan. He was the 1974 recipient of Ramon Magsaysay Award for administrative originality in modernizing a backward prefecture in a manner congenial to the traditional minded yet attracting the young.

== Career ==
In 1979, Kuroki was arrested and indicted on charges of accepting 30 million yen in bribes from a construction company during his sixth term in office as governor. He was sentenced to three years in prison but was subsequently acquitted in 1988.

He died of pneumonia at a hospital in Miyazaki on 24 December 2001, aged 94.
