= 1927 in Japan =

- Decades: 1900s; 1910s; 1920s; 1930s; 1940s
- See also: Other events of 1927; History of Japan • Timeline • Years

Events in the year 1927 in Japan. It corresponds to Shōwa 2 (昭和2年) in the Japanese calendar.

== Incumbents ==
- Emperor: Hirohito
- Prime Minister:
  - Wakatsuki Reijirō (until April 20)
  - Tanaka Giichi (From April 20)

=== Governors ===
- Aichi Prefecture: Saburo Shibata (until 17 May); Toyoji Obata (starting 17 May)
- Akita Prefecture: Nakano Kunikazu (until 17 May); Yuichiro Chikaraishi (starting 17 May)
- Aomori Prefecture:
  - until 27 May: Koyanagi Mamoru
  - 27 May-7 November: Jiro Morioka
  - starting 7 November: Tetsuzo Yoshimura
- Ehime Prefecture: Masayasu Kosaka (until 27 May); Yujiro Ozaki (starting 27 May)
- Fukui Prefecture: Keizo Ichimura
- Fukuoka Prefecture: Saito Morikuni (starting month unknown)
- Fukushima Prefecture: Hiroshi Kawabuchi (until 27 May); Ito Kihachiro (starting 27 May)
- Gifu Prefecture: Shintaro Suzuki (until 27 May); Rokuichiro Ono (starting 27 May)
- Gunma Prefecture: Kotsuke (until 27 May); Agata Shinobu (starting 27 May)
- Hiroshima Prefecture: Kaiichiro Suematsu (until 7 November); Sukenari Yokoyama (starting 7 November)
- Ibaraki Prefecture:
  - until 17 May: Kihachiro Ito
  - 17 May-7 November: Sanosuke
  - starting 7 November: Jiro Morioka
- Ishikawa Prefecture: Korekiyo Otsuka then Sukenari Yokoyama
- Iwate Prefecture: Kakichi Tokuno
- Kagawa Prefecture: Misho Miura (until 27 May); Toshio Motoda (starting 27 May)
- Kanagawa Prefecture: Ikeda Hiroshi
- Kochi Prefecture: Sato Naorimittsu (until 17 May); Aidkame Kiyoo (starting 17 May)
- Kumamoto Prefecture: Masao Oka (until 17 May); Saito Munenori (starting 17 May)
- Kyoto Prefecture:
  - until April: Tsunenosuke Hamada
  - April-July: Shigoro Sugiyama
  - starting July Shigeyoshi Omihara
- Mie Prefecture: Endo Ryusaku
- Miyagi Prefecture: Katorataro Ushizu
- Miyazaki Prefecture: Kiyoo Aida (until 17 May); Akira Kouda (starting 17 May)
- Nagano Prefecture: Umetani Mitsusada (until 28 April); Ryo Chiba (starting 28 April)
- Niigata Prefecture: Takeo Mimatsu (until 28 April); Shohei Fujinoma (starting 28 April)
- Okayama Prefecture: Masao Kishimoto (starting month unknown)
- Okinawa Prefecture: Tsuguo Imashuku (until 7 May); Tōjirō Iio (starting 7 May)
- Osaka Prefecture: Harumichi Tanabe (starting month unknown)
- Saitama Prefecture:
  - until 17 May: Saito Morikuni
  - 17 May-7 November: Yashu
  - starting 7 November: Miyawaki Umekichi
- Shiga Prefecture: Shinya Kurosaki (until month unknown)
- Shiname Prefecture:
  - until 18 May: Jiro Morioko
  - 17 May-18 May: Yukichi Shirakami
  - starting 18 May: Rinsaku Yagi
- Tochigi Prefecture: Hyoichi Fujioka (until 17 May); Takeichi Fujiyama (starting 17 May)
- Tokyo: Hiroshi Hiratsuka
- Toyama Prefecture: Yukichi Shirakami (until 17 May); Shirane Takesuke (starting 17 May)
- Yamagata Prefecture: Misawa Kan'ichi (until 17 May); Shinohara Eitaro (starting 17 May)

== Events ==
- January – Shōwa financial crisis: In the ensuing bank run, 37 banks throughout Japan (including the Bank of Taiwan), and the second-tier zaibatsu Suzuki Shoten, went under. Prime Minister Wakatsuki attempted to have an emergency decree issued to allow the Bank of Japan to extend emergency loans to save these banks, but his request was denied by the Privy Council
- January 23 – Okuro Oikawa discovers a new asteroid 1266 Tone at the Tokyo Observatory.
- February 8 – Emperor Taishō is buried in the Musashi Imperial Graveyard in Hachiōji, Tokyo. The funeral was held at night and consisted of a 4-mile-long procession in which 20,000 mourners followed a herd of sacred bulls and an ox-drawn cart containing the imperial coffin. The funeral route was lit with wood fires in iron lanterns. The emperor's coffin was then transported to his mausoleum in the western suburbs of Tokyo.
- March 7 – Kita Tango earthquake: with a moment magnitude of 7.0. Up to 2,956 people were killed 7,806 were injured. Almost all the houses in Mineyama (now part of Kyōtango) were destroyed as a result. The earthquake was felt as far away as Tokyo and Kagoshima.
- April 20 – Prime Minister Wakatsuki Reijirō is forced to resign during the Shōwa financial crisis and is succeeded by Tanaka Giichi who manages to control the situation with a three-week bank holiday and the issuance of emergency loans.
- July 24 – Writer Ryūnosuke Akutagawa commits suicide in the early morning hours at the age of 35 through an overdose of barbital.
- August 24 – Mihonoseki Incident: The light cruiser Jintsuu and the Momi-class destroyer Warabi, both ships of the Imperial Japanese Navy, collided at the mouth of Miho Bay. There were 92 naval personnel who were killed when the Warabi sunk, and 28 were killed aboard the Jintsuu. Captain Keiji Mizushiro (1883–1927) was questioned, but committed suicide before the beginning of the trial.
- September 13 – JVC (Victor Corporation of Japan), as predecessor of JVCKenwood was founded.
- December 30 – Japan's first subway line started running between Asakusa station and Ueno station, Tokyo. The line was called Ginza Line in 1953 (Showa 28, 昭和28年).

== Births ==
- January 28 – Hiroshi Teshigahara, film maker (d. 2001)
- January 30 – Keizo Yamada, long-distance runner (d. 2020)
- February 14 – Seizō Katō, voice actor (d. 2014)
- March 14 – Yoichi Nishimaru, physician (d. 2020)
- March 15 – Junzo Sekine, professional baseball player (d. 2020)
- March 21 – Mariko Miyagi, actress, singer, and advocate (d. 2020)
- April 2 – Hisashi Katsuta, actor and voice actor (d. 2020)
- June 16 – Yoshiro Hayashi, politician (d. 2017)
- July 7 – Kōji Nanbara, actor (d. 2001)
- August 1 – Hiroshi Mitsuzuka, politician (d. 2004)
- August 15 – Akio Sato, politician (d. 2007)
- August 24 – Tatsumi Kumashiro, film director (d. 1995)
- September 10 – Sachiko, Princess Hisa, second child of Emperor Shōwa (d. 1928)
- September 16 – Sadako Ogata, academic, diplomat and author (d. 2019)
- November 7
  - Mayumi Moriyama, politician and cabinet minister (d. 2021)
  - Hiroshi Yamauchi, businessman (d. 2013)
- December 16 – Akihiko Hirata, film actor (d. 1984)

== Deaths ==
- February 6 – Kamio Mitsuomi, admiral (b. 1856)
- February 23 – Noda Utarō, entrepreneur, politician (b. 1853)
- March 20 – Kusunose Yukihiko, general (b. 1858)
- May 1 – Tetsugorō Yorozu, painter (b. 1885)
- May 2 – Fukuda Hideko, author, educator and feminist (b. 1865)
- July 24 – Ryūnosuke Akutagawa, short story writer, drug-related suicide (b. 1892)
- September 5 – Katō Sadakichi, admiral (b. 1861)
- September 18 – Kenjirō Tokutomi, philosopher and writer (b. 1868)
- September 24 – Yamagata Isaburō, politician (b. 1858)
- October 26 – Jūkichi Yagi, poet (b. 1898)
- November 15 – Murakami Kakuichi, admiral (b. 1862)

== See also ==
- List of Japanese films of the 1920s
