= Takekai Shirane =

Japanese official (1883–1957)

- 白根 竹介
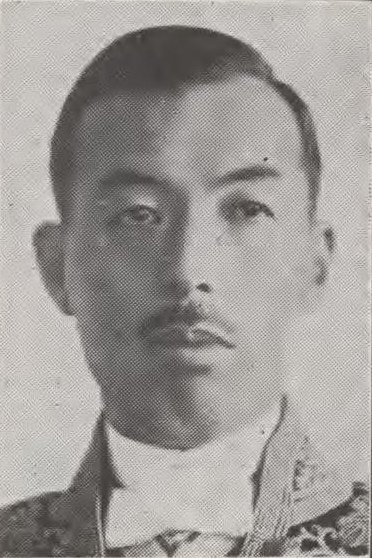

Chief Cabinet Secretary
- In office 12 May 1935 – 9 March 1936
- Prime Minister: Keisuke Okada
- Preceded by: Shigeru Yoshida
- Succeeded by: Shōhei Fujinuma

Member of the House of Peers
- In office 2 September 1936 – 2 May 1947 Nominated by the Emperor
Gubernatorial offices
Governor of Hyōgo Prefecture
In office 18 December 1931 – 15 January 1935
Monarch	Hirohito
Preceded by	Makie Koyanagi
Succeeded by	Michio Yuzawa
Governor of Hiroshima Prefecture
In office 8 May 1931 – 18 December 1931
Monarch	Hirohito
Preceded by	Hiroshi Kawabuchi
Succeeded by	Ryo Chiba
Governor of Shizuoka Prefecture
In office 5 July 1929 – 8 May 1931
Monarch	Hirohito
Preceded by	Kyūichi Hasegawa
Succeeded by	Ken Uzawa
Governor of Saitama Prefecture
In office 6 February 1929 – 5 July 1929
Monarch	Hirohito
Preceded by	Umekichi Miyawaki
Succeeded by	Chōhei Hosokawa
Governor of Toyama Prefecture
In office 17 May 1927 – 6 February 1929
Monarch	Hirohito
Preceded by	Yukichi Shirakami
Succeeded by	Tsunezō Yamanaka
Governor of Ishikawa Prefecture
In office 28 September 1926 – 17 May 1927
Monarchs	Taishō; Hirohito
Preceded by	Chō Enren
Succeeded by	Isei Otsuka
Governor of Gifu Prefecture
In office 24 June 1924 – 28 September 1926
Monarch	Taishō
Preceded by	Manpei Ueda
Succeeded by	Shintarō Suzuki

Personal details
- Born: 25 May 1883 Yamaguchi Prefecture, Japan
- Died: 5 March 1957 (aged 73)
- Party: Independent
- Children: Ayao Shirane
- Relatives: Shirane Sen'ichi (uncle); Shimooka Chūji (brother-in-law)
- Education: Tokyo Imperial University

Takekai Shirane (25 May 1883 – 5 March 1957) was a Japanese official who served as Chief Cabinet Secretary under Prime Minister Keisuke Okada from 1935 to 1936. An official in the Home Ministry, he served as governor of a large number of prefectures throughout his career, including Hyōgo, Hiroshima and Shizuoka.

Preceded by Hiroshi Kawabuchi	Governor of Hiroshima Prefecture; May–Dec. 1931	Succeeded by Ryo Chiba
