= Tsunei Kusunose =

Japanese politician

- 楠瀬 常猪

Member of the House of Councillors
- In office 20 December 1950 – 2 May 1953
- Preceded by: Shikazo Sasaki
- Succeeded by: Kiichi Miyazawa
- Constituency: Hiroshima at-large

Governor of Hiroshima Prefecture
- In office 16 April 1947 – 29 November 1950
- Monarch: Hirohito
- Preceded by: Tokiichiro Takewaka
- Succeeded by: Hiroo Ōhara
- In office 27 October 1945 – 14 March 1947
- Monarch: Hirohito
- Preceded by: Kodama Kyūichi
- Succeeded by: Tokiichiro Takewaka

Personal details
- Born: 10 February 1899 Hiroshima Prefecture, Japan
- Died: 18 June 1988 (aged 89)
- Party: Liberal
- Education: Tokyo University of Commerce

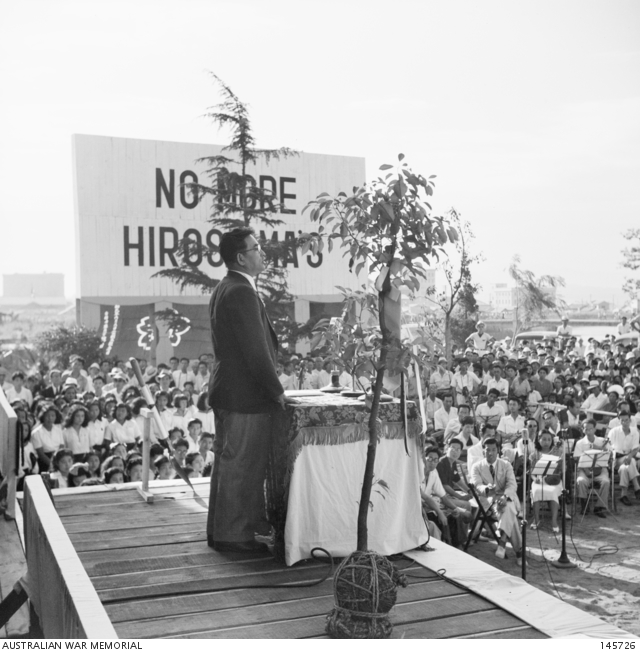
The citizens of Hiroshima and members of the Occupation Force and Occupation Force civilians are addressed by Kusunose Tsunei, governor of Hiroshima Prefecture.

Tsunei Kusunose (楠瀬 常猪, Kusunose Tsunei; 10 February 1899 – 18 June 1988) was the Governor of Hiroshima Prefecture from October 1945 to November 1950.

Kusunose was appointed to his position as governor at a time when the city of Hiroshima was in destruction following the first use of the nuclear bomb in August 1945. He was appointed by the Japanese government to fill that position upon the expiration of the appointment of his predecessor Genshin Takano. In 1947 he was elected to the same position and thus became the first elected governor of Hiroshima Prefecture.

As part of his efforts to reconstruct the city, he held on 22 February 1946, a conference on the future of Hiroshima with the participation of historian Yoshirō Saeki, novelist Yoko Ota, deputy Mayor of Kure Tomiko Koura and others.

As governor, he followed a policy of refraining from antagonizing the US military authorities in control of Hiroshima at the time, and supported the suppression by US and Australian troops of the workers' strike in June 1949 in protest of the dismissal of workers of Nihon Seiko company, an event known as the Nikko Incident.

In 1950, he resigned his post as governor to run for a vacant seat in the House of Councillors. He was elected, and served until losing in the 1953 election. During his term in the House of Councillors, in 1952, was one of the initiators of a visit of sympathy by a group of survivors of the atomic attack on Hiroshima to the war criminals kept at Sugamo Prison.

Died in 1988 of heart failure.

== Notes ==
Preceded by Kodama Kyūichi	Governor of Hiroshima Prefecture; 27 Oct. 1945 – 14 March 1947	Succeeded by Shinichiro Takekawa
Preceded by Shinichiro Takekawa	Governor of Hiroshima Prefecture; 16 Apr. 1947 – 29 Nov 1950	Succeeded by Hiroo Ōhara
