= Takewaka =

Takewaka is a Japanese surname. Notable people with the surname include:

- Takuma Takewaka (born 1971), Japanese voice actor
- Tokiichiro Takewaka (1901–?), Governor of Hiroshima Prefecture

== See also ==
- Takekawa (disambiguation)
