= Saburo Hayakawa =

Japanese politician (1888–1973)

- 早川 三郎
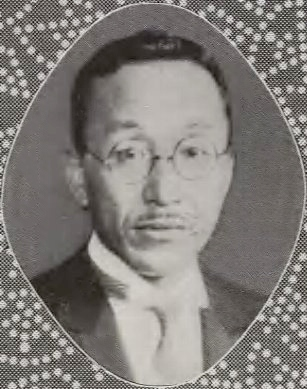

Superintendent General of the Tokyo Metropolitan Police Department
- In office 8 January 1937 – 10 February 1937
- Preceded by: Ishida Kaoru
- Succeeded by: Sukenari Yokoyama
Gubernatorial offices
Governor of Aichi Prefecture
In office 25 January 1946 – 9 July 1946
Monarch	Hirohito
Preceded by	Ryūichi Fukumoto
Succeeded by	Mikine Kuwahara
Governor of Hiroshima Prefecture
In office 22 April 1936 – 8 January 1937
Monarch	Hirohito
Preceded by	Keiichi Suzuki
Succeeded by	Aijiro Tomita
Governor of Kagoshima Prefecture
In office 15 January 1935 – 22 April 1936
Monarch	Hirohito
Preceded by	Keizō Ichimura
Succeeded by	Yasujirō Nakamura
Governor of Mie Prefecture
In office 23 June 1933 – 15 January 1935
Monarch	Hirohito
Preceded by	Hisatada Hirose
Succeeded by	Aijiro Tomita
Governor of Saga Prefecture
In office 18 December 1931 – 23 June 1933
Monarch	Hirohito
Preceded by	Kiyoshi Nakarai
Succeeded by	Nagakazu Fujioka

Personal details
- Born: 8 April 1888 Kanagawa Prefecture, Japan
- Died: 19 April 1973 (aged 85)
- Education: Tokyo Imperial University

Saburo Hayakawa (8 April 1888 – 19 April 1973) was a Japanese politician who served as governor of Hiroshima Prefecture from April 1936 to January 1937. He was born in Kanagawa Prefecture and graduated from the University of Tokyo. He was also governor of Saga Prefecture (1931–1933), Mie Prefecture (1933–1935), Kagoshima Prefecture (1935–1936) and Aichi Prefecture (1946).

Preceded by Keiichi Suzuki	Governor of Hiroshima Prefecture; 1936–1937	Succeeded by Aijiro Tomita
Preceded by Fukumoto Ryūichi	Governor of Aichi Prefecture; 1946	Succeeded by Mikine Kuwahara
