= Korekiyo =

- Gender: Male

Origin
- Origin: Japanese
- Meaning: Different meanings depending on the kanji used

Korekiyo (written: 是清) is a masculine Japanese given name. Notable people with the name include:

- Korekiyo Otsuka (1884–1945), Japanese politician
- Takahashi Korekiyo (高橋 是清; 1854–1936), Japanese politician

== Fictional characters ==
- Korekiyo Shinguuji (真宮寺 是清), a character in the video game Danganronpa V3: Killing Harmony
