= Chisaka =

Chisaka (written: 千坂) is a Japanese surname. Notable people with the surname include:

- Chisaka Takafusa (千坂 高房, 1638–1700), Japanese samurai
- Chisaka Takamasa (千坂 高雅, 1841–1912), Japanese samurai
