= Yasushi Nomura =

Japanese bureaucrat, statesman and cabinet minister

Senior Second Rank Viscount Yasushi Nomura
- 野村 靖
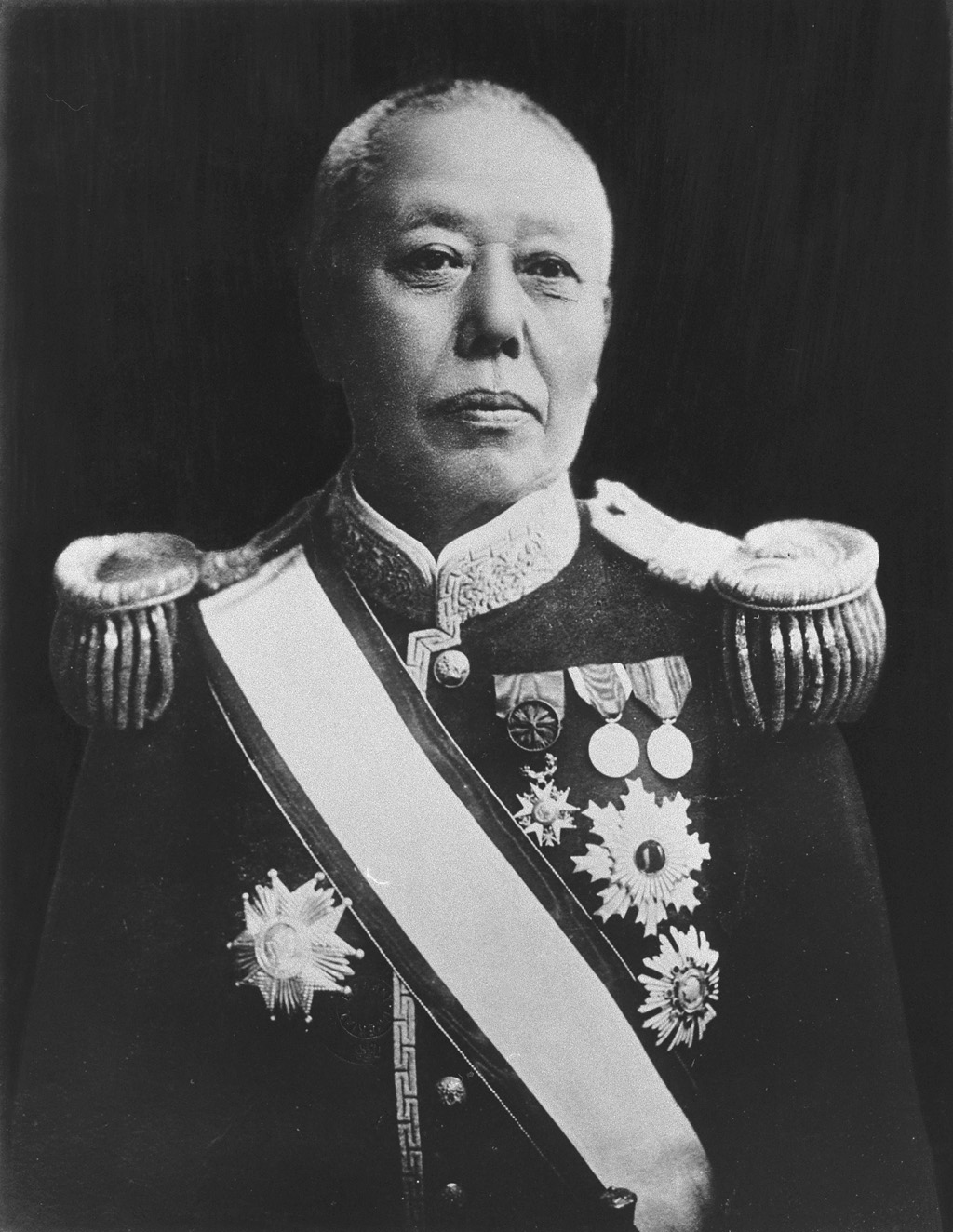

Minister of Communications
- In office 26 September 1896 – 12 January 1898
- Prime Minister: Matsukata Masayoshi
- Preceded by: Shirane Sen'ichi
- Succeeded by: Suematsu Kenchō

Minister of Home Affairs
- In office 15 October 1894 – 3 February 1896
- Prime Minister: Itō Hirobumi
- Preceded by: Inoue Kaoru
- Succeeded by: Yoshikawa Akimasa

Member of the Privy Council
- In office 9 March 1900 – 24 January 1909
- Monarch: Meiji
- In office 10 November 1893 – 15 October 1894
- Monarch: Meiji
- In office 20 November 1888 – 26 March 1891
- Monarch: Meiji

Governor of Kanagawa Prefecture
- In office 28 March 1876 – 8 November 1881
- Monarch: Meiji
- Preceded by: Nakajima Nobuyuki
- Succeeded by: Morikata Oki

Personal details
- Born: 10 September 1842 Chōshū Domain, Japan
- Died: 24 January 1909 (aged 66) Kamakura, Kanagawa, Japan
- Resting place: Shōin Jinja, Tokyo, Japan

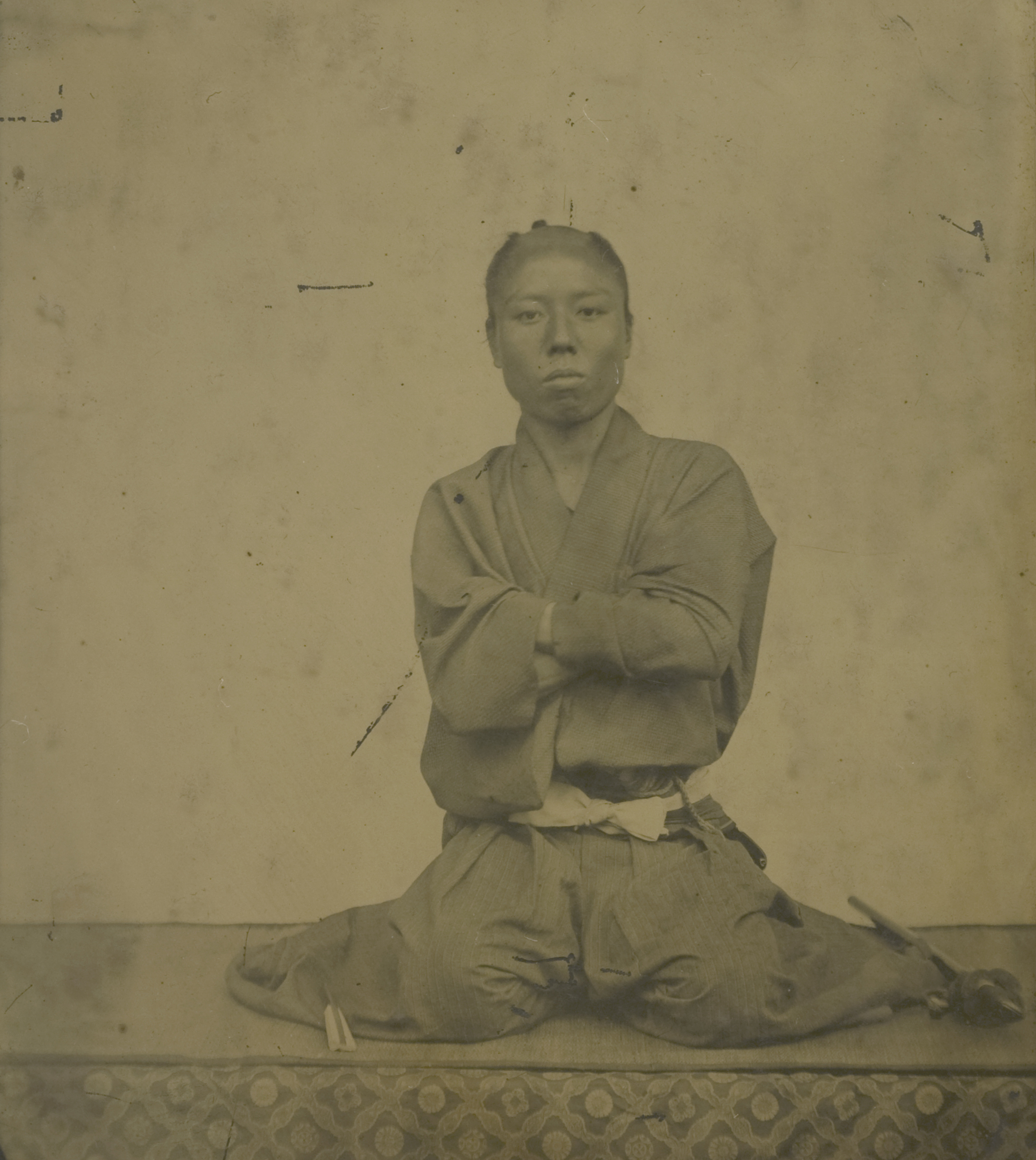
Young Nomura as a Choshu samurai

Viscount Nomura Yasushi (野村 靖, Nomura Yasushi; 10 September 1842 – 24 January 1909) was a Japanese bureaucrat, statesman and cabinet minister, active in Meiji period Japan.

== Biography ==
Nomura was born as the second son of a low-ranked ashigaru samurai in Hagi, Chōshū Domain, (currently Yamaguchi Prefecture). As a youth, he studied at Yoshida Shōin's Shokansonjuku academy, where he joined the Sonnō jōi movement against the Tokugawa shogunate and the increasing foreign presence in Japan. He participated in the unsuccessful assassination attempt against the rōjū Manabe Akikatsu and in the burning of the British legation in Edo in 1862. He fought as a member of the Chōshū armies against the Tokugawa during the Second Chōshū expedition.

After the Meiji Restoration, he went to Tokyo and entered into service of the new Meiji government, and was selected as a member of the 1871 Iwakura Mission, visiting the United States, Great Britain and other European countries. After his return to Japan, he was appointed governor of Kanagawa Prefecture, where he was praised for his efforts in reducing government spending. He was ennobled with the kazoku peerage title of shishaku (viscount) in 1887. In 1888, he was made a member of the Privy Council and in 1891 served as Japanese ambassador to France.

Nomura was selected to become Home Minister in the cabinet of the 2nd administration of Prime Minister Itō Hirobumi in 1894. During his tenure, the three Tama districts, formerly part of Kanagawa Prefecture, were annexed to Tokyo Prefecture. Nomura returned to the cabinet as Minister of Communications in 1896 under the 2nd Matsukata administration, during which time he attempted to stem the influence of the Mitsubishi zaibatsu, which had been strongly favored by Maejima Hisoka, over control of Japanese shipping.

Nomura died in 1909. His grave is at the Shōin Jinja, a Shinto shrine in Setagaya, Tokyo, near the grave of Yoshida Shōin.

== Notes ==
Political offices
Preceded by Inoue Kaoru	Home Minister; 15 October 1894 – 3 February 1896	Succeeded by Yoshikawa Akimasa
Preceded by Shirane Senichi	Communications Minister; 26 September 1896 – 12 January 1898	Succeeded by Suematsu Kenchō
