= Shintarō Suzuki =

Japanese politician

- 鈴木 信太郎
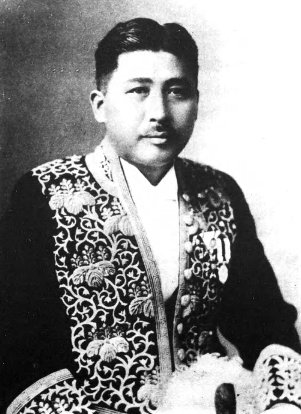

Governor of Kyoto Prefecture
- In office January 1935 – April 1936
- Monarch: Hirohito
- Preceded by: Munenori Saito
- Succeeded by: Keiichi Suzuki
Additional positions
Governor of Nagasaki Prefecture
In office 28 August 1931 – 15 January 1935
Monarch	Hirohito
Preceded by	Makie Koyanagi
Succeeded by	Kōtarō Tanaka
Governor of Nagano Prefecture
In office 5 July 1929 – 28 August 1931
Monarch	Hirohito
Preceded by	Ryo Chiba
Succeeded by	Kuraji Ishigaki
Governor of Yamanashi Prefecture
In office 17 May 1927 – 5 July 1929
Monarch	Hirohito
Preceded by	Chōji Minabe
Succeeded by	Kiichi Hirata
Governor of Gifu Prefecture
In office 28 September 1926 – 17 May 1927
Monarchs	Taishō; Hirohito
Preceded by	Takekai Shirane
Succeeded by	Rokuichirō Ōno
Governor of Nara Prefecture
In office 25 October 1923 – 28 September 1926
Monarch	Taishō
Preceded by	Motoo Naruge
Succeeded by	Sotaro Beppu

Personal details
- Born: 8 November 1884 Yonezawa, Yamagata, Japan
- Died: 27 June 1958 (aged 73)
- Relatives: Tokonami Takejirō (father-in-law)
- Education: Tokyo Imperial University

Shintarō Suzuki (鈴木 信太郎, Suzuki Shintarō; 8 November 1884 – 27 June 1958) was a Japanese politician. He was born in Yamagata Prefecture. He was the son-in-law of Tokonami Takejirō. He was governor of Nara Prefecture (1923–1926), Gifu Prefecture (1926–1927), Yamanashi Prefecture (1927–1929), Nagano Prefecture (1929–1931), Nagasaki Prefecture (1931–1935) and Kyoto Prefecture (1935–1936). He was a member of the Government-General of Taiwan.

== Bibliography ==
- Ueda Masaaki他『Japan人名大辞典』講談社、2001.
- Successive governor編纂会編『新編Japanのsuccessive governor』successive governor編纂会、1991.
- Ikuhiko Hata編『Comprehensive Encyclopedia of the Japanese Bureaucracy：1868 - 2000』University of Tokyo Press、2001.
- 『山梨Encyclopedia』増補改訂版、山梨日日新聞社、1989.
