= Keiichi Suzuki (politician) =

Japanese politician (1889–1973)

- 鈴木 敬一
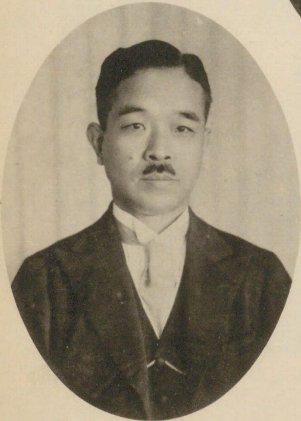

Governor of Kyoto Prefecture
- In office April 1936 – April 1939
- Monarch: Hirohito
- Preceded by: Shintarō Suzuki
- Succeeded by: Kotora Akamatsu

Governor of Hiroshima Prefecture
- In office 15 January 1935 – 22 April 1936
- Monarch: Hirohito
- Preceded by: Michio Yuzawa
- Succeeded by: Saburo Hayakawa

Governor of Kumamoto Prefecture
- In office 28 June 1932 – 15 January 1935
- Monarch: Hirohito
- Preceded by: Ken'ichi Yamashita
- Succeeded by: Ennosuke Sekiya

Governor of Toyama Prefecture
- In office 15 April 1931 – 28 June 1932
- Monarch: Hirohito
- Preceded by: Tsunezō Yamanaka
- Succeeded by: Itsuki Saito

Personal details
- Born: 25 July 1889 Aichi Prefecture, Japan
- Died: 29 November 1973 (aged 84) Tokyo, Japan
- Resting place: Tama Cemetery
- Education: Niigata High School; First Higher School
- Alma mater: Tokyo Imperial University

Keiichi Suzuki (鈴木 敬一; 25 July 1889 – 29 November 1973) was a Japanese politician who served as governor of Hiroshima Prefecture from January 1935 to April 1936. He was also governor of Toyama Prefecture (1931–1932), Kumamoto Prefecture (1932–1935) and Kyoto Prefecture (1936–1939).
