= 1185 Nikko =

Main-belt asteroid

Discovery
- Discovered by: O. Oikawa
- Discovery site: Tokyo Astronomical Obs. (389)
- Discovery date: 17 November 1927

Designations
- Named after: Nikkō (Japanese city)
- Alternative designations: 1927 WC · 1930 SE_{1} 1930 SG_{1} · 1930 SH_{1}
- Minor planet category: main-belt · (inner)

Orbital characteristics
- Epoch 4 September 2017 (JD 2458000.5)
- Uncertainty parameter 0
- Observation arc: 86.78 yr (31,697 days)
- Aphelion: 2.4744 AU
- Perihelion: 2.0006 AU
- Semi-major axis: 2.2375 AU
- Eccentricity: 0.1059
- Orbital period (sidereal): 3.35 yr (1,222 days)
- Mean anomaly: 280.93°
- Mean motion: 0° 17^{m} 40.2^{s} / day
- Inclination: 5.7013°
- Longitude of ascending node: 71.904°
- Argument of perihelion: 1.9614°

Physical characteristics
- Dimensions: 8.347±0.297 km 11.35 km (calculated); 12.56±0.83 km
- Synodic rotation period: 3.781±0.0326; 3.78615±0.00005 h 3.788±0.0326 h 3.7889±0.0004 h 3.79±0.01 h 3.792±0.002 h
- Geometric albedo: 0.164±0.023; 0.20 (assumed); 0.370±0.041
- Spectral type: S (Tholen) · S (SMASS); S B–V = 0.923; U–B = 0.514
- Absolute magnitude (H): 11.674±0.002 (R) · 11.99±0.33 · 12.09

1185 Nikko, provisional designation 1927 WC, is a stony asteroid from the inner regions of the asteroid belt, approximately 10 kilometers in diameter. It was discovered on 17 November 1927 by Okuro Oikawa at the Tokyo Astronomical Observatory, Japan. The asteroid was named after the Japanese city of Nikkō.

== Orbit and classification ==
Nikko orbits the Sun in the inner main-belt at a distance of 2.0–2.5 AU once every 3 years and 4 months (1,222 days). Its orbit has an eccentricity of 0.11 and an inclination of 6° with respect to the ecliptic. Nikko's observation arc begins with its first used observation taken at Johannesburg Observatory in 1930, or 3 years after its official discovery observation at Tokyo.

== Physical characteristics ==
In both the Tholen and SMASS taxonomy, Nikko is a common stony S-type asteroid.

=== Rotation period ===
Between 2004 and 2011, several rotational lightcurves of Nikko were obtained from photometric observations taken by astronomers Laurent Bernasconi, Hiromi and Hiroko Hamanowa, John Menke, Robert Stephens, as well as at the Palomar Transient Factory in California. Lightcurve analysis gave a rotation period between 3.781 and 3.792 hours with a brightness variation between 0.26 and 0.50 magnitude (U=3/3/3/3-/2/2).

=== Diameter and albedo ===
According to the survey carried out by the Japanese Akari satellite and NASA's Wide-field Infrared Survey Explorer with its subsequent NEOWISE mission, Nikko measures 8.347 and 12.56 kilometers in diameter, and its surface has an albedo of 0.370 and 0.164, respectively. The Collaborative Asteroid Lightcurve Link assumes a standard albedo for stony asteroids of 0.20 and calculates a diameter of 11.35 kilometers with an absolute magnitude of 12.09.

== Naming ==
This minor planet was named for the Japanese city of Nikkō, located in the Tochigi Prefecture of central Japan. The tourist resort is known for its Shinto shrine and a UNESCO World Heritage Site Nikkō Tōshō-gū. The official naming citation was published by Paul Herget in The Names of the Minor Planets in 1955 (H 110).
