= 1098 Hakone =

Asteroid

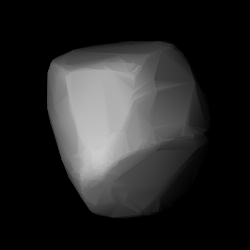
- Modelled shape of Hakone from its lightcurve

Discovery
- Discovered by: O. Oikawa
- Discovery site: Tokyo Astronomical Obs.
- Discovery date: 5 September 1928

Designations
- Pronunciation: Japanese: [hakone]
- Named after: Mount Hakone (Japanese volcanic mountain)
- Alternative designations: 1928 RJ · 1926 EC; 1950 QH_{1} · 1952 BE_{1} A906 RD · A917 DD
- Minor planet category: main-belt · (middle); background

Orbital characteristics
- Epoch 4 September 2017 (JD 2458000.5)
- Uncertainty parameter 0
- Observation arc: 110.19 yr (40,247 days)
- Aphelion: 3.0081 AU
- Perihelion: 2.3686 AU
- Semi-major axis: 2.6884 AU
- Eccentricity: 0.1189
- Orbital period (sidereal): 4.41 yr (1,610 days)
- Mean anomaly: 13.741°
- Mean motion: 0° 13^{m} 24.96^{s} / day
- Inclination: 13.377°
- Longitude of ascending node: 329.00°
- Argument of perihelion: 80.805°

Physical characteristics
- Mean diameter: 24.44 km (derived); 24.73±1.1 km 24.90±0.57 km 26.684±0.397 km 29.567±0.135 km
- Synodic rotation period: 7.14±0.01 h 7.14117±0.00001 h 7.142±0.002 h 7.16±0.050 h
- Pole ecliptic latitude: (40.0°, 43.0°) (λ_{1}/β_{1})
- Geometric albedo: 0.1745±0.0334; 0.1865 (derived); 0.206±0.009; 0.2404±0.022; 0.245±0.013
- Spectral type: SMASS = Xe · M · X
- Absolute magnitude (H): 10.20 · 10.350±0.120 (R) · 10.5

1098 Hakone (prov. designation: 1928 RJ) is a background asteroid from the central regions of the asteroid belt. The X-type asteroid has a rotation period of 7.1 hours and measures approximately 25 kilometers (16 miles) in diameter. Discovered by Japanese astronomer Okuro Oikawa at Tokyo Observatory in 1928, the asteroid was later named after the volcanic Mount Hakone in Japan.

== Orbit and classification ==
Located in the orbital region of the stony Eunomia family, Hakone is a non-family asteroid from the main belt's background population when applying the hierarchical clustering method to its proper orbital elements. It orbits the Sun in the central asteroid belt at a distance of 2.4–3.0 AU once every 4 years and 5 months (1,610 days). Its orbit has an eccentricity of 0.12 and an inclination of 13° with respect to the ecliptic.

== Discovery ==
Hakone was discovered by Japanese astronomer Okuro Oikawa at the old Tokyo Astronomical Observatory (389) on 5 September 1928. It was independently discovered by German astronomer Max Wolf at Heidelberg Observatory and Soviet astronomer Grigory Neujmin at the Simeiz Observatory on the Crimean peninsula on 9 and 11 September 1928, respectively. The Minor Planet Center, however, only acknowledges the first discoverer. The asteroid was first observed as A906 RD at Taunton Observatory (803) on 16 September 1906. The body's observation arc begins the following month at the U.S. Naval Observatory, almost 22 years prior to its official discovery observation at Tokyo.

== Naming ==
This minor planet was named after the volcanic Mount Hakone, located 80 kilometers from the discovering Tokyo Astronomical Observatory and near the Japanese town of Hakone. The mountain resort is known for its hot springs, Lake Ashi and its view of Mount Fuji, after which the asteroid 1584 Fuji was named. The official naming citation was prepared by astronomer Kōichirō Tomita.

== Physical characteristics ==
In the SMASS classification, Hakone is a Xe-subtype, that transitions from the X-type the very bright E-type asteroids. It has also been characterized as a metallic M-type asteroid, by the Wide-field Infrared Survey Explorer.

=== Rotation period ===
Several rotational lightcurves of Hakone were obtained from photometric observations. Analysis of the best-rated lightcurve by French amateur astronomer Laurent Bernasconi gave a rotation period of 7.142 hours with a brightness amplitude of 0.35 magnitude (U=3/3/2).

=== Spin axis ===
A 2016-published lightcurve, using modeled photometric data from the Lowell Photometric Database (LPD), gave a concurring period of 7.14117 hours, as well as a spin axis of (40.0°, 43.0°) in ecliptic coordinates (λ, β).

=== Diameter and albedo ===
According to the surveys carried out by the Infrared Astronomical Satellite IRAS, the Japanese Akari satellite and the NEOWISE mission of NASA's WISE telescope, Hakone measures between 24.73 and 29.567 kilometers in diameter and its surface has an albedo between 0.1745 and 0.245.

The Collaborative Asteroid Lightcurve Link derives an albedo of 0.1865 and a diameter of 24.44 kilometers based on an absolute magnitude of 10.5.
