= Aijiro Tomita =

Japanese politician (1885–1954)

- 富田 愛次郎
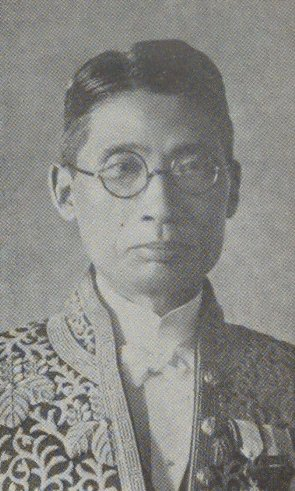

Member of the House of Representatives
- In office 30 April 1942 – 18 December 1945
- Preceded by: Multi-member district
- Succeeded by: Constituency abolished
- Constituency: Aichi 3rd

Governor of Hiroshima Prefecture
- In office 8 January 1937 – 9 November 1938
- Monarch: Hirohito
- Preceded by: Saburo Hayakawa
- Succeeded by: Ichisho Inuma

Governor of Mie Prefecture
- In office 15 January 1935 – 8 January 1937
- Monarch: Hirohito
- Preceded by: Saburo Hayakawa
- Succeeded by: Kyōshirō Andō

Personal details
- Born: 5 December 1885 Aichi Prefecture, Japan
- Died: 3 November 1954 (aged 68)
- Party: Imperial Rule Assistance Association
- Education: Kyoto Imperial University

Aijiro Tomita (富田 愛次郎, Tomita Aijirō; 5 December 1885 – 3 November 1954) was a Japanese politician who served as governor of Hiroshima Prefecture from January 1937 to November 1938. He was governor of Mie Prefecture from 1935 to 1937.

Preceded by Saburo Hayakawa	Governor of Hiroshima Prefecture; 1937–1938	Succeeded by Ichisho Inuma
