= Hattori Ichizo =

Japanese politician

- 服部 一三
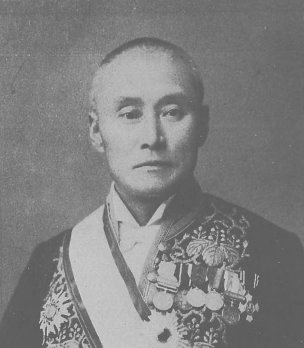

Member of the House of Peers
- In office 15 July 1903 – 25 January 1929 Nominated by the Emperor
Gubernatorial offices
Governor of Hyōgo Prefecture
In office 25 October 1900 – 28 April 1916
Monarchs	Meiji; Taishō
Preceded by	Shōichi Ōmori
Succeeded by	Seino Chōtarō
Governor of Nagasaki Prefecture
In office 28 December 1898 – 25 October 1900
Monarch	Meiji
Preceded by	Komatsubara Eitarō
Succeeded by	Yoshitarō Arakawa
Governor of Hiroshima Prefecture
In office 28 July 1898 – 28 December 1898
Monarch	Meiji
Preceded by	Takatoshi Iwamura
Succeeded by	Egi Kazuyuki
Governor of Iwate Prefecture
In office 24 April 1891 – 28 July 1898
Monarch	Meiji
Preceded by	Ishii Shoichiro
Succeeded by	Suehiro Naokata

Personal details
- Born: 13 March 1851 Yoshiki, Suō, Japan
- Died: 25 January 1929 (aged 77)
- Resting place: Aoyama Cemetery
- Education: Rutgers College

Hattori Ichizo (Japanese: 服部 一三, Hepburn: Hattori Ichizō; 13 March 1851 – 25 January 1929) was a Japanese politician who served as governor of Hiroshima Prefecture from July to December 1898. He was also governor of Iwate Prefecture (1891–1898), Nagasaki Prefecture (1898–1900) and Hyōgo Prefecture (1900–1916).

He was the first president of the Seismological Society of Japan (1880–1882), as well as president of Kyoritsu Women's University (1886–1891). He was on the faculty of the University of Tokyo and Kyoto University.

Preceded by Takatoshi Iwamura	Governor of Hiroshima Prefecture; July–December 1898	Succeeded by Egi Kazuyuki
