= Shirane Sen'ichi =

Japanese politician

Baron Shirane Sen'ichi
- 白根 専一
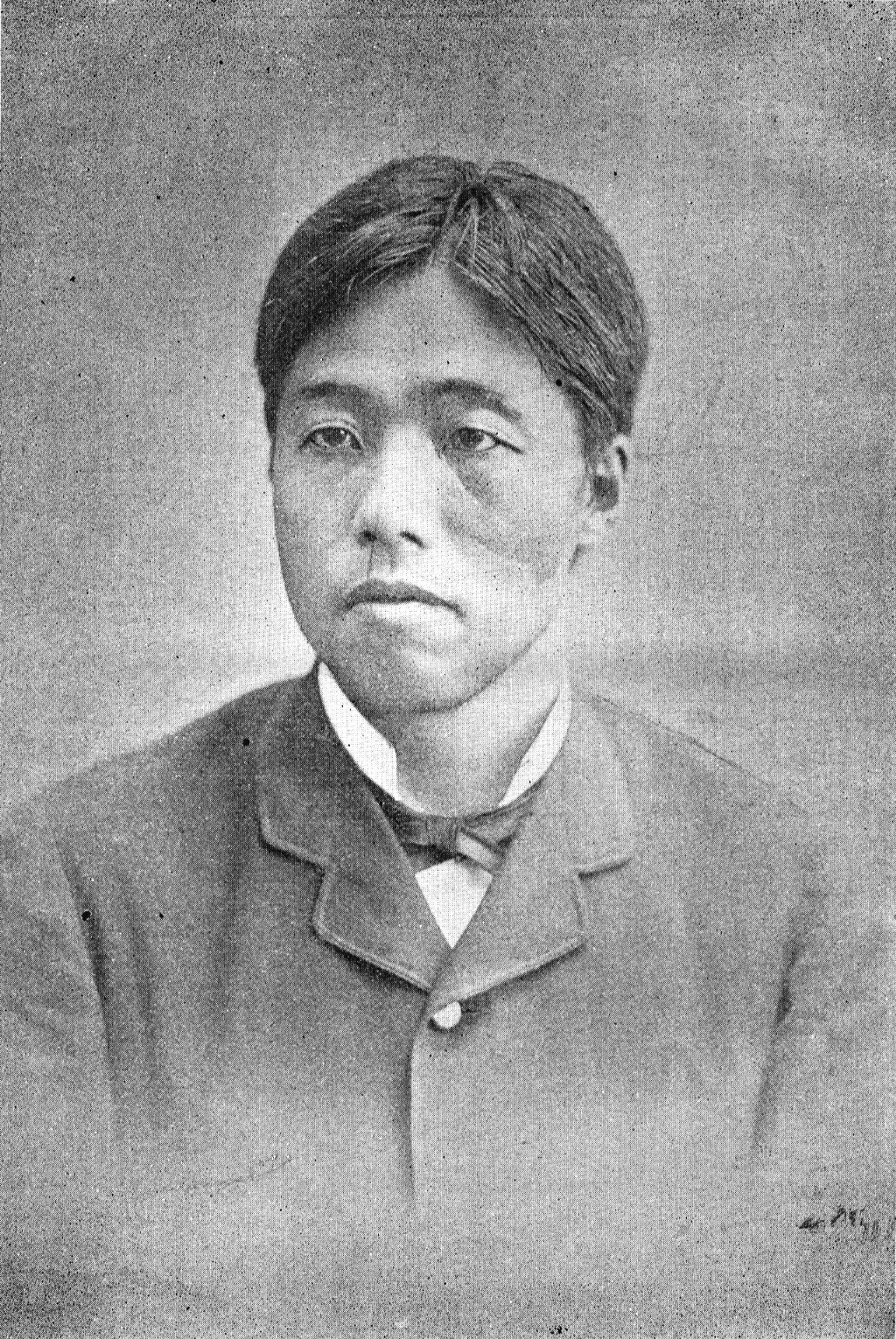

Minister of Communications
- In office 9 October 1895 – 26 September 1896
- Prime Minister: Itō Hirobumi; Matsukata Masayoshi
- Preceded by: Watanabe Kunitake
- Succeeded by: Yasushi Nomura

Member of the House of Peers
- In office 10 July 1897 – 14 June 1898 Elected by the Barons

Governor of Aichi Prefecture
- In office 28 December 1889 – 17 May 1890
- Monarch: Meiji
- Preceded by: Minoru Katsumata
- Succeeded by: Takatoshi Iwamura

Governor of Ehime Prefecture
- In office 29 February 1888 – 26 December 1889
- Monarch: Meiji
- Preceded by: Fujimura Shirō
- Succeeded by: Minoru Katsumata

Personal details
- Born: 3 February 1850 Hagi, Chōshū, Japan
- Died: 14 June 1898 (aged 48) Tokyo, Japan
- Party: Kokumin Kyōkai
- Relatives: Takekai Shirane (nephew)
- Education: Meirinkan
- Alma mater: Keio Gijuku

Baron Shirane Sen'ichi (白根 専一; 3 February 1850 – 14 June 1898) was a Japanese politician and bureaucrat in the Meiji period. In 1907, he was raised to the rank and title of danshaku (baron) under the kazoku peerage system.

== Early life and education ==
Shirane was born in Hagi as the younger son of a samurai in the service of Chōshū Domain. He was educated at the domain’s Meirinkan academy. After the Meiji restoration, in 1868 he travelled to Tokyo and entered the Keio Gijuku, the predecessor to Keio University. On graduation, he accepted a bureaucratic position in the Ministry of Justice, but changed to the Home Ministry shortly thereafter.

== Political career ==
Shirane was appointed Governor of Ehime Prefecture in 1888, and Governor of Aichi Prefecture in 1889. After serving as Vice Minister of Home Affairs under Saigō Tsugumichi during the First Yamagata Cabinet. He continued in his post under Shinagawa Yajirō in the First Matsukata Cabinet (1891–1892). He assisted Shinagawa in using his authority as Home Minister to take police action to suppress opposition political party activities during the tumultuous Japanese 1892 election by accusing candidates of sedition, and intimidating candidates and voters. Shinagawa came under much public criticism over the resulting riots and other public disturbances around Japan was forced to resign from his post. Shirane was not initially forced to resign as well despite his activities under Shingawa, and his constant attempts to undermine Shinagawa’s successor as Home Minister, Soejima Taneomi.

From 9 October 1895 to 26 September 1896, Shirane was appointed Minister of Communications under the Second Itō Cabinet. On 7 February 1897 he was elevated to the kazoku peerage with the title of baron (danshaku), and in July he elected to the House of Peers as a baronial member, a position he held to his death in June 1898 of gastric cancer.

Political offices
Preceded by Watanabe Kunitake	Minister of Communications; 1895–1896	Succeeded by Nomura Yasushi
Preceded by Yoshikawa Akimasa	Vice Minister of Home Affairs; 1890–1892	Succeeded by Kunimichi Kitagaki
