= Kisaburō Andō =

Japanese politician

- 安藤 紀三郎
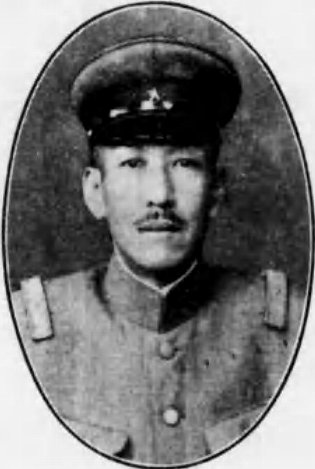

Minister of Home Affairs
- In office 20 April 1943 – 22 July 1944
- Prime Minister: Hideki Tojo
- Preceded by: Michio Yuzawa
- Succeeded by: Shigeo Ōdachi

Vice President of the Imperial Rule Assistance Association
- In office 22 October 1941 – 20 April 1943
- President: Hideki Tojo
- Preceded by: Heisuke Yanagawa
- Succeeded by: Fumio Gotō

Member of the House of Peers
- In office 21 July 1944 – 13 December 1945 Nominated by the Emperor

Personal details
- Born: 11 February 1874 Hyōgo Prefecture, Japan
- Died: 10 May 1954 (aged 80)
- Resting place: Gokoku-ji
- Party: IRAA
- Education: Imperial Japanese Army Academy

Military service
- Allegiance: Empire of Japan
- Branch/service: Imperial Japanese Army
- Years of service: 1899–1939
- Rank: Lieutenant general

Kisaburō Andō (安藤 紀三郎, Andō Kisaburō; 11 February 1874 – 10 May 1954) was a career officer and lieutenant general in the Imperial Japanese Army, who served as a politician and cabinet minister in the government of the Empire of Japan during World War II.

== Life and military career ==
Born to an ex-samurai family of Sasayama Domain in Hyōgo Prefecture, Andō graduated from the eleventh class of the Imperial Japanese Army Academy in 1899. In 1901, as a second lieutenant in the infantry, he served in the 10th Brigade of the Taiwan Garrison. He was promoted to lieutenant in 1904, and served as a company commander in the IJA 10th Infantry Regiment, and was subsequently promoted to captain, and to major in 1913.

In 1918, Andō was sent as a military attaché to the United States, and was promoted to lieutenant colonel while on assignment. On his return, he served in the Personnel Bureau of the Ministry of War from 1921 to 1922. In 1922, he was promoted to colonel, and assigned command of the IJA 73rd Infantry Regiment, followed by the IJA 2nd Infantry Regiment. From 1923 to 1927, he returned to the Personnel Bureau at the Ministry of War.

After Andō was promoted to major general in 1927, he commanded the IJA 30th Infantry Brigade until 1929, and was attached to the staff of the IJA 1st Division from 1929 to 1932.

In 1932, Andō was promoted to lieutenant general, and became commandant of the Ryōjun Fortress in the Kwantung Leased Territory from 1932 to 1934. Although Andō went into the reserves in 1934, and quickly retired, he was recalled to active duty in 1937 with the start of the Second Sino-Japanese War and was assigned command of the 9th Depot Division. He retired again in 1939.

In 1940, with the founding of the Taisei Yokusankai political party, Andō became active in politics and was made vice-chairman of the party. He was also the commander of the party's paramilitary youth wing, the Yokusan Sonendan. In 1942, with the establishment of the Tōjō administration, Andō joined the cabinet as a minister without portfolio. One of his tasks, assigned personally by Emperor Hirohito was to coordinate efforts to suppress news of the Japanese defeat at the Battle of Midway.

The following year, he was asked to assume the post of Home Minister, serving until the fall of the Tōjō administration in 1944. During his tenure as Home Minister, he was successful in curbing the leadership of the Yokusan Sonendan, which had become politicized, and which had become increasingly critical of older politicians and bureaucrats and was starting to evolve into a populist political movement independent of the Taisei Yokusankai.

He subsequently was appointed to a seat in the upper house of the Diet of Japan.

After World War II, in December 1945, Andō was arrested by the American Occupation authorities on Class A war criminal charges along with all other members of the wartime Japanese government. He was held in Sugamo Prison until December 1948, but was never brought to trial before the International Military Tribunal for the Far East. He died soon on 10 May 1954.

== Notes ==
Political offices
Preceded by Michio Yuzawa	Home Minister; 20 April 1943 – 22 July 1944	Succeeded by Shigeo Ōdachi
