= Sadaaki Senda =

Governor of Hiroshima Prefecture (1836–1908)

Baron Sadaaki Senda
- 千田 貞暁
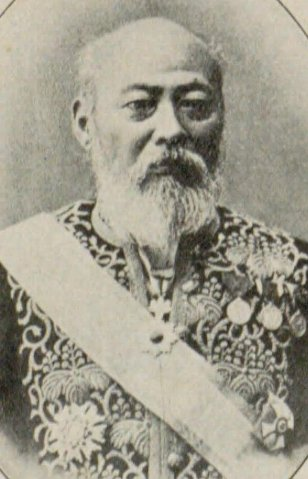

Member of the House of Peers
- In office 10 July 1904 – 23 April 1908 Elected by the Barons
Gubernatorial offices
Governor of Miyazaki Prefecture
In office 20 January 1894 – 3 June 1898
Monarch	Meiji
Preceded by	Hagiwara Hiroe
Succeeded by	Kabayama Sukeo
Governor of Kyoto Prefecture
In office July 1892 – November 1893
Monarch	Meiji
Preceded by	Kunimichi Kitagaki
Succeeded by	Nakai Hiroshi
Governor of Aichi Prefecture
In office 15 January 1892 – 20 July 1892
Monarch	Meiji
Preceded by	Takatoshi Iwamura
Succeeded by	Yasukazu Yasuba
Governor of Wakayama Prefecture
In office 9 April 1891 – 15 January 1892
Monarch	Meiji
Preceded by	Tadaakira Ishii
Succeeded by	Morikata Oki
Governor of Niigata Prefecture
In office 18 April 1889 – 9 April 1891
Monarch	Meiji
Preceded by	Shinozaki Gorō
Succeeded by	Koteda Yasusada
Governor of Hiroshima Prefecture
In office 6 April 1880 – 26 December 1889
Monarch	Meiji
Preceded by	Benzō Fujii
Succeeded by	Nabeshima Miki

Personal details
- Born: 9 September 1836
- Died: 23 April 1908 (aged 71)

Sadaaki Senda (千田貞暁, Senda Sadaaki; 9 September 1836 – 23 April 1908) was the Governor of Hiroshima Prefecture from 1880 to 1889. His most ambitious project was the construction of Ujina port (later to become Hiroshima Port), which was completed in November 1889. He was the Governor of Niigata Prefecture (1889–1891), Wakayama Prefecture (1891–1892), Aichi Prefecture (1892), Kyoto Prefecture (1892–1893) and Miyazaki Prefecture (1894–1898).

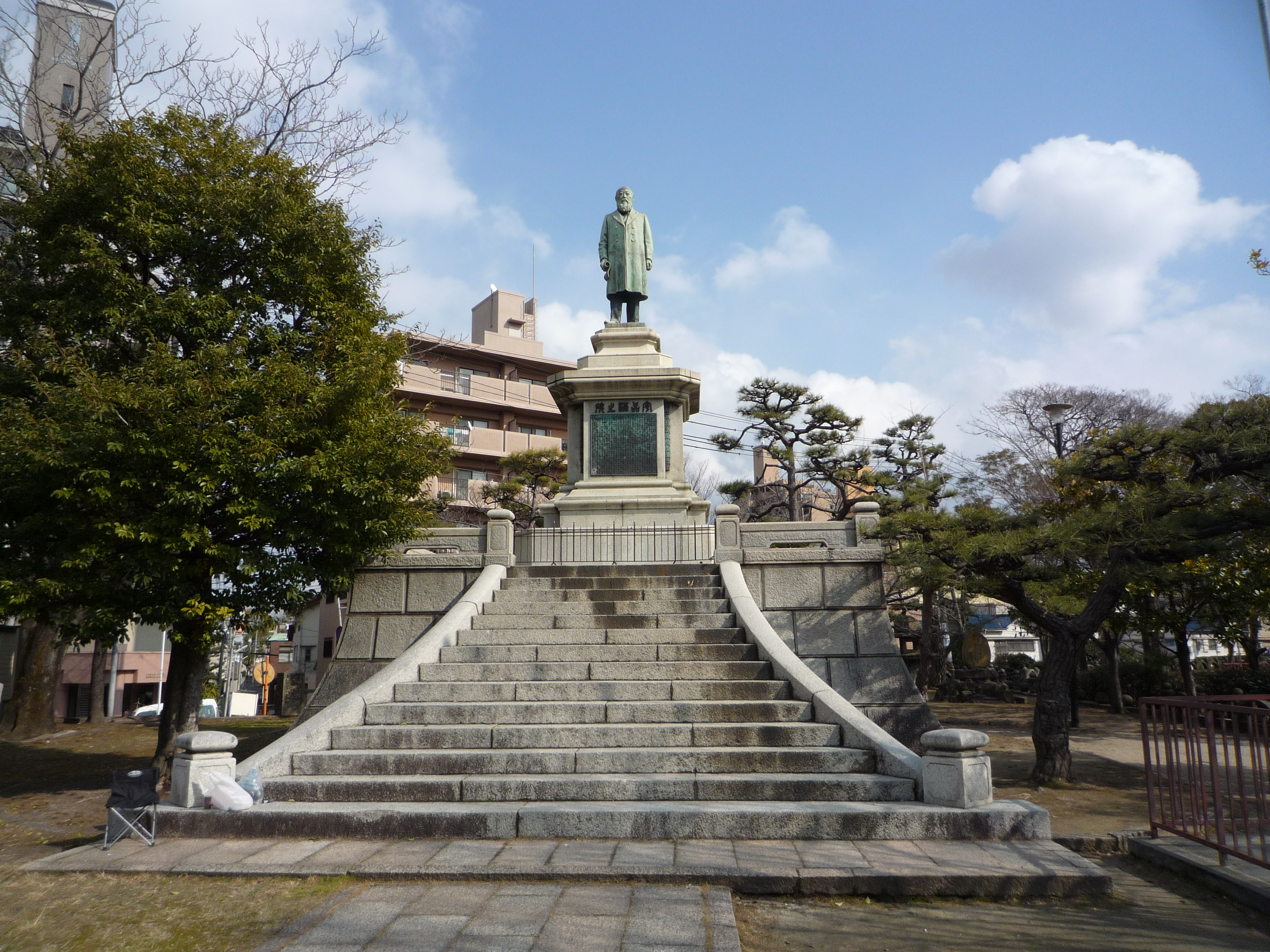
Statue

A bronze statue of Senda was constructed at Ujina, where it still stands today.

Preceded by Fujii Benzō	Governor of Hiroshima Prefecture; 1880–1889	Succeeded by Nabeshima Miki
Preceded by Kunimichi Kitagaki	Governor of Kyoto Prefecture; 1892–1893	Succeeded by Hiroshi Nakai
