= Ichisho Inuma =

Japanese politician (1892–1982)

- 飯沼 一省
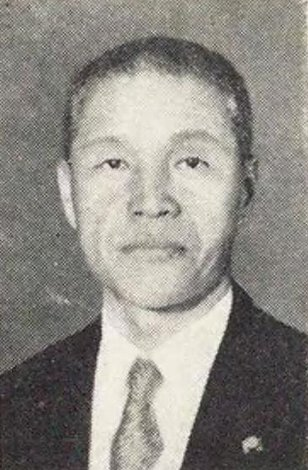

Member of the House of Peers
- In office 12 March 1946 – 2 May 1947 Nominated by the Emperor
Gubernatorial offices
Governor of Tokyo
In office 13 March 1947 – 14 April 1947
Monarch	Hirohito
Preceded by	Seiichirō Yasui
Succeeded by	Seiichirō Yasui
Governor of Kanagawa Prefecture
In office 5 September 1939 – 9 April 1940
Monarch	Hirohito
Preceded by	Seiichi Ōmura
Succeeded by	Mitsuma Matsumura
Governor of Hiroshima Prefecture
In office 9 November 1938 – 5 September 1939
Monarch	Hirohito
Preceded by	Aijiro Tomita
Succeeded by	Aikawa Katsuroku
Governor of Shizuoka Prefecture
In office 5 June 1937 – 9 November 1938
Monarch	Hirohito
Preceded by	Itsuki Saito
Succeeded by	Iwao Yamazaki
Governor of Saitama Prefecture
In office 10 July 1934 – 25 May 1935
Monarch	Hirohito
Preceded by	Hisatada Hirose
Succeeded by	Itsuki Saito

Personal details
- Born: 15 February 1892 Aizuwakamatsu, Fukushima, Japan
- Died: 14 November 1982 (aged 90)
- Spouse: Kaiko Minami
- Children: 2
- Relatives: Iinuma Sadakichi (uncle); Hiroshi Minami (father-in-law)
- Education: Tokyo Imperial University

Ichisho Inuma (15 February 1892 – 14 November 1982) was a Japanese politician who served as governor of Hiroshima Prefecture from November 1938 to September 1939. He was a graduate of the University of Tokyo. He was also the governor of Saitama Prefecture (1934–1935), Shizuoka Prefecture (1937–1938) and Kanagawa Prefecture (1939–1940).

He was appointed as a member of the House of Peers by Imperial decree on 12 March 1946.

Preceded by Hirose Hisatada	Governor of Saitama Prefecture; 1934–1935	Succeeded by Saito Juri
Preceded by Aijiro Tomita	Governor of Hiroshima Prefecture; 1938–1939	Succeeded by Katsuroku Aikawa
Preceded by Seiichi Ōmura	Governor of Kanagawa Prefecture; 1939–1940	Succeeded by Mitsuma Matsumura
