= Aikawa Katsuroku =

Japanese politician

- 相川 勝六
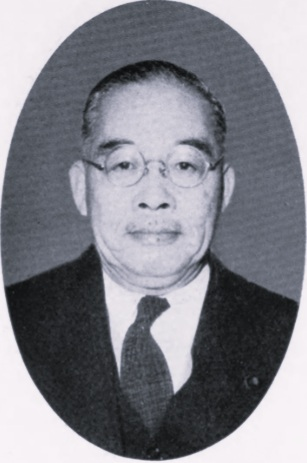
- Aikawa in 1960

Minister of Health and Welfare
- In office 10 February 1945 – 7 April 1945
- Prime Minister: Kuniaki Koiso
- Preceded by: Hisatada Hirose
- Succeeded by: Tadahiko Okada

Member of the House of Representatives
- In office 1 October 1952 – 13 November 1972
- Preceded by: Jūen Satō
- Succeeded by: Ryōichi Oriono
- Constituency: Miyazaki 1st
Gubernatorial offices
Governor of Ehime Prefecture
In office 1 July 1943 – 18 April 1944
Monarch	Hirohito
Preceded by	Ryūichi Fukumoto
Succeeded by	Chiyoji Yukisawa
Governor of Aichi Prefecture
In office 26 March 1941 – 9 June 1942
Monarch	Hirohito
Preceded by	Kodama Kyūichi
Succeeded by	Chiyoji Yukisawa
Governor of Hiroshima Prefecture
In office 5 September 1939 – 26 March 1941
Monarch	Hirohito
Preceded by	Ichisho Inuma
Succeeded by	Tokiji Yoshinaga
Governor of Miyazaki Prefecture
In office 7 July 1937 – 4 September 1939
Monarch	Hirohito
Preceded by	Seiya Mishima
Succeeded by	Tōru Hasegawa

Personal details
- Born: 6 December 1891 Ureshino, Saga, Japan
- Died: 3 October 1973 (aged 81)
- Party: Liberal Democratic
- Other political affiliations: Liberal (1952–1955)
- Education: Tokyo Imperial University

Aikawa Katsuroku (Japanese: 相川 勝六) (1891–1973) was a Japanese Home Ministry government official and politician.

Katsuroku was born in Ureshino, Saga Prefecture. He graduated from the University of Tokyo. He was an official in the Police Bureau of the Home Ministry. He was Governor of Miyazaki Prefecture (1937–1939), Hiroshima (1939–1941), Aichi Prefecture (1941–1942) and Ehime Prefecture (1943–1944). He was minister of health and welfare in the Government of Japan (1945), and represented Miyazaki Prefecture in the lower house of the National Diet from 1952 to 1972.

Preceded by Seiya Mishima	Governor of Miyazaki Prefecture; 1937–1939	Succeeded by Toru Hasegawa
Preceded by Ichisho Inuma	Governor of Hiroshima Prefecture; 1939–1941	Succeeded by Tokiji Yoshinaga
Preceded by Kodama Kyūichi	Governor of Aichi Prefecture; 1941–1942	Succeeded by Yukizawa Chiyoji
Preceded by Ryuichi Fukumoto	Governor of Ehime Prefecture; 1943–1944	Succeeded by Yukizawa Chiyoji
Preceded by Hisatada Hirose	Minister of Health and Welfare of Japan; 1945	Succeeded by Tadahiko Okada
