= Tokiji Yoshinaga =

Japanese politician (1892–1976)

- 吉永 時次
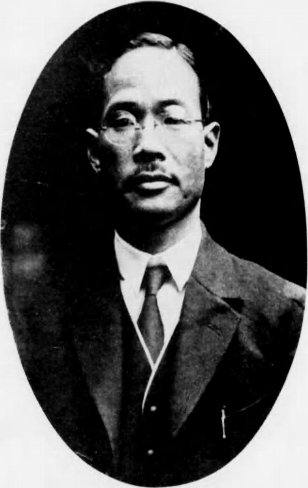

Superintendent General of the Tokyo Metropolitan Police Department
- In office 15 June 1942 – 22 April 1943
- Preceded by: Yukio Tomeoka
- Succeeded by: Yoshitomo Susukida
Gubernatorial offices
Governor of Hiroshima Prefecture
In office 26 March 1941 – 15 June 1942
Monarch	Hirohito
Preceded by	Aikawa Katsuroku
Succeeded by	Saiichiro Miyamura
Governor of Ibaraki Prefecture
In office 11 January 1939 – 26 March 1941
Monarch	Hirohito
Preceded by	Shigeru Hazama
Succeeded by	Kan'ichi Naitō
Governor of Wakayama Prefecture
In office 22 April 1936 – 11 January 1939
Monarch	Hirohito
Preceded by	Nagakazu Fujioka
Succeeded by	Shimizu Shigeo

Personal details
- Born: Tokiji Kishimoto; 8 February 1892 Naka-ku, Okayama, Japan
- Died: 25 March 1976 (aged 84)
- Spouse: Mitsuno Yoshinaga (m. 1928)
- Education: Tokyo Imperial University

Tokiji Yoshinaga (吉永時次; 8 February 1892 – 25 March 1976) was a Japanese politician who served as governor of Hiroshima Prefecture from 26 March 1941 to 15 June 1942.

Preceded by Katsuroku Aikawa	Governor of Hiroshima Prefecture; 1941–1942	Succeeded by Saiichiro Miyamura
