= Chisaka Takamasa =

Japanese samurai of the late Edo period

Junior Third Rank Chisaka Takamasa
- 千坂 高雅
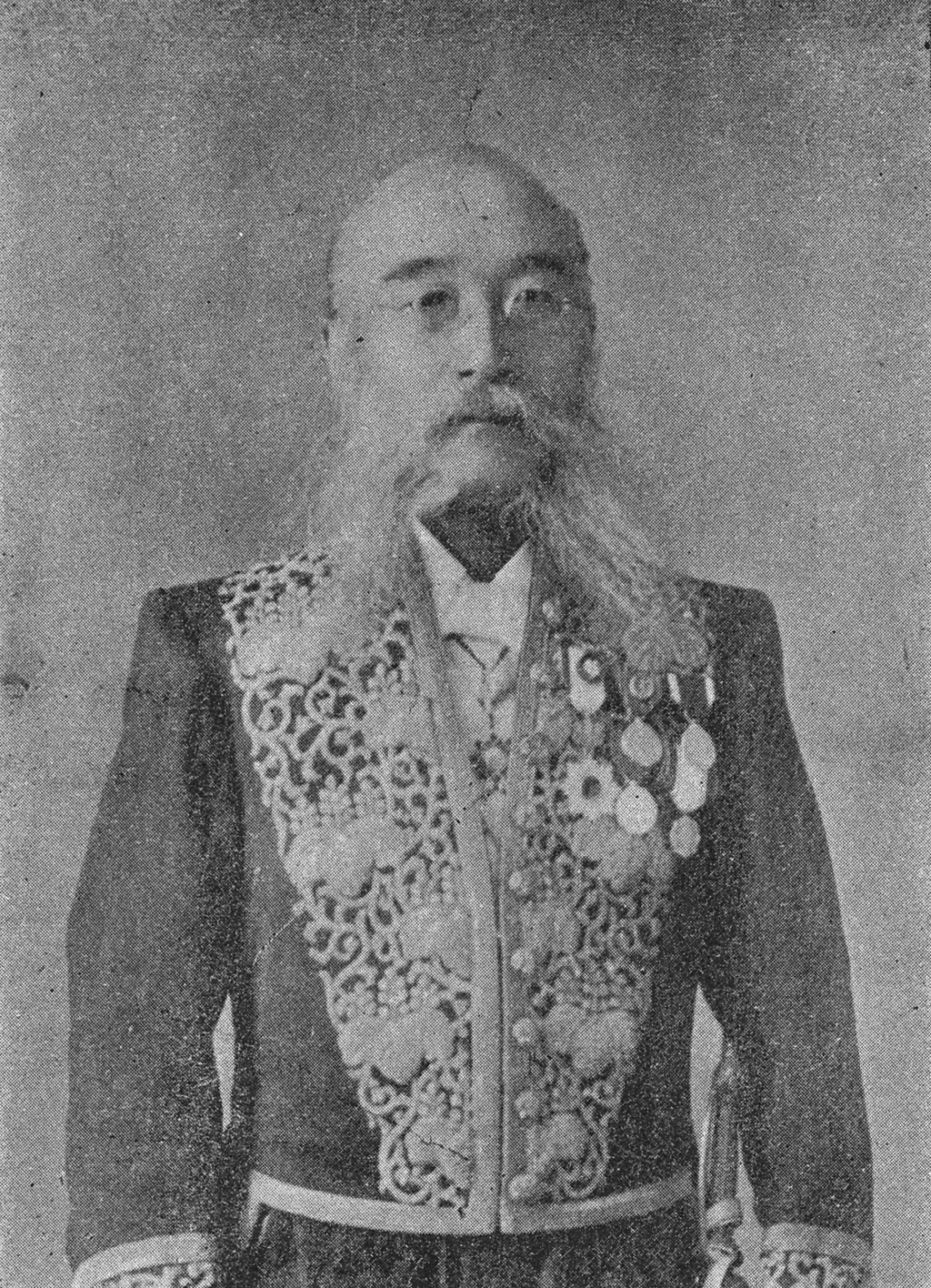

Member of the House of Peers
- In office 19 September 1894 – 3 December 1912 Nominated by the Emperor

Governor of Okayama Prefecture
- In office 22 December 1884 – 19 September 1894
- Monarch: Meiji
- Preceded by: Takasaki Goroku
- Succeeded by: Kōno Chūzō

Governor of Ishikawa Prefecture
- In office 24 February 1879 – 19 January 1883
- Monarch: Meiji
- Preceded by: Junkō Kiriyama
- Succeeded by: Takatoshi Iwamura

Personal details
- Born: 11 March 1841 Yonezawa, Dewa, Japan
- Died: 3 December 1912 (aged 71)
- Parent: Takaaki Chisaka (father)
- Occupation: Soldier, bureaucrat, businessman

Military service
- Rank: First lieutenant
- Battles/wars: Satsuma Rebellion

Chisaka Takamasa (千坂 高雅; 11 March 1841 – 3 December 1912) was a Japanese samurai of the late Edo period who went on to become a soldier, government official, and businessman in the Meiji era. He served as a karō in the Yonezawa Domain's administration.

== Biography ==
Takamasa was born in 1841 to a prominent samurai family in Akita Prefecture of the Yonezawa Domain. He was the first son of Takaaki Chisaka, who was the chief retainer of the Yonezawa clan.

=== Government service ===
Takamasa entered official service in 1863 and five years later, in 1863, he was given command of the han military force. He was promoted as a dai-sanji (chief councilor) in 1870 and later accompanied the clan lord Shigenori Uesugi on his European tour. When he returned to Japan in 1875, he served in the government's Home Ministry. It is noted that his position in the ministry was not secure due to his Yonezawa roots. The installation of representatives of the central governments from among those who came from the abolished domains was not universally welcomed in the ministry.

In 1876 Takamasa would be called upon to put down the rebellion in the Ibaraki prefecture, and later in 1877, during the Satsuma Rebellion, he was appointed a first lieutenant in the army.

=== Private sector ===
After his retirement from government service, Takamasa joined the private sector, holding executive positions at companies such as the Ryou Ginko (Ryou Bank), Ujigawa Hydroelectric Power Station, and Yokohama Soko (Yokohama Warehouse).

Takamasa's career demonstrated the transition of the lives of the samurai from service to their lords to civil or government service in modern Japan. This development was also indicative of the relationships between the samurai and their previous lords. In the case of Takamasa, his former liege promoted his employment – as was done for other former samurai (shizoku jusan) of the Kanazawa – by getting his appointment as Nomi County Chief approved. He was later appointed as the governor of Ishikawa Prefecture.

Takamasa was the father of Captain Tomojiro Chisaka, the commander of the Yakumo, and Major Yojiro Chisaka, who served in the Imperial Army. He died on 3 December 1912, due to pleurisy and inflammation of the lungs.
