= Benzō Fujii =

Japanese politician

- 藤井 勉三
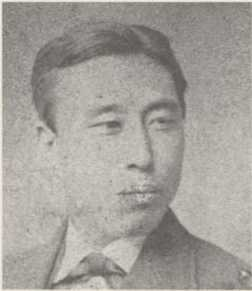

Governor of Hiroshima Prefecture
- In office 23 February 1875 – 6 April 1880
- Monarch: Meiji
- Preceded by: Date Muneoki
- Succeeded by: Sadaaki Senda

Fifth Rank Judge of Hiroshima Prefecture
- In office 5 June 1875 – 24 January 1876

Lieutenant Governor of Tsuruga Prefecture
- In office 19 January 1873 – 25 January 1875
- Succeeded by: Taketoshi Yamada

Councilor of Tsuruga Prefecture
- In office 8 May 1872 – 19 January 1873
- Preceded by: Naomitsu Kumagai
- Succeeded by: Ujihisa Murata

Personal details
- Born: February/March 1840 (Note: The first month of Tenpō 11 (天保11年1月) in the Japanese calendar, that is between 3 February and 4 March of 1840.) or c. 1842 Yamaguchi, Chōshū, Japan
- Died: September 1880 or 1881 (aged 40 or 38–39) Hiroshima, Japan

Benzō Fujii (Note: 藤井 勉三（ふじい べんぞう）) (1840–1880 or c. 1842–1881) was a Japanese bakumatsu-era samurai in the Chōshū Domain and an early Meiji era politician who served as lieutenant governor of Tsuruga Prefecture in 1873–1875 and governor of Hiroshima Prefecture in 1875–1880.

== Biography ==
=== Early life ===
Benzō Fujii was born in present-day Yamaguchi Prefecture in 1840 or around 1842 into a samurai household serving the Chōshū Domain. Funded by the domain, he went to Europe to study in 1871.

=== Career ===
Map showing Tsuruga Prefecture ("敦賀"; center) as of late 1872, prior to the incorporation of Asuwa Prefecture ("足羽"; top right)

He then entered service for the Meiji government. He was made councilor (参事, sanji) of Tsuruga Prefecture (now part of Fukui Prefecture) on 8 May 1872, and was promoted to lieutenant governor (権令, gonrei) on 19 January 1873. On 10 November 1872, he was conferred the rank of Junior 6th Rank (従六位, Ju-roku-i). In the same month, he proposed to the Ministry of Finance that Tsuruga Prefecture be merged with neighboring Asuwa Prefecture, due to the importance of Tsuruga Port. The proposal was accepted, and Asuwa Prefecture was merged into Tsuruga Prefecture in January 1873. On 13 February 1873, his rank was elevated to Senior 6th Rank (正六位, Shō-roku-i).

He was relocated to Hiroshima Prefecture on 25 January 1875 and assigned the role of lieutenant governor, and, between 5 June 1875 and 24 January 1876, also as Fifth Rank Judge. He was soon promoted to governor of Hiroshima Prefecture on 23 February, a role he held until 1880. One month later (23 March), his rank was further elevated to Junior 5th Rank (従五位, Ju-go-i). During his tenure as governor, he summoned the prefectural assembly for the first time and strived to better organize local finance. He also actively went on inspection tours across the prefecture.

=== Illness and death ===
He was prone to falling ill since his days in Tsuruga Prefecture (1872–1875). He left office on 6 April 1880 due to an illness, and died in September 1880 or 1881. A funeral service was held for him on 20 September of 1880 or 1881. (Note: The listed year in the publication is inconsistent, showing both Meiji 13 (1880) and Meiji 14 (1881) to be the year of the funeral, one of which is likely a typographical error.)

Preceded by Date Muneoki	Governor of Hiroshima Prefecture; 1875–1880	Succeeded by Sadaaki Senda
