= 1088 Mitaka =

Asteroid

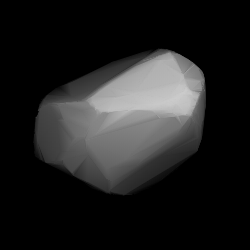
- Modelled shape of Mitaka from its lightcurve

Discovery
- Discovered by: O. Oikawa
- Discovery site: Tokyo Astronomical Obs.
- Discovery date: 17 November 1927

Designations
- Named after: Mitaka (Japanese village)
- Alternative designations: 1927 WA · 1942 FR; 1953 VW_{3} · 1971 BE; A917 RA
- Minor planet category: main-belt · (inner); background

Orbital characteristics
- Epoch 4 September 2017 (JD 2458000.5)
- Uncertainty parameter 0
- Observation arc: 88.22 yr (32,224 days)
- Aphelion: 2.6328 AU
- Perihelion: 1.7722 AU
- Semi-major axis: 2.2025 AU
- Eccentricity: 0.1954
- Orbital period (sidereal): 3.27 yr (1,194 days)
- Mean anomaly: 200.92°
- Mean motion: 0° 18^{m} 5.4^{s} / day
- Inclination: 7.6514°
- Longitude of ascending node: 54.495°
- Argument of perihelion: 319.50°

Physical characteristics
- Mean diameter: 11.33±2.51 km 13.35±0.75 km 15.137±0.131 km 15.957±0.030 km 16.016 km 16.02 km (taken)
- Synodic rotation period: 3.027±0.003 h 3.0353±0.0005 h 3.035377 h 3.035378±0.000005 h 3.0354±0.0002 h 3.0361±0.0007 h 3.049±0.005 h
- Pole ecliptic latitude: (115.0°, 46.0°) (λ_{1}/β_{1}); (278.0°, −72.0°) (λ_{2}/β_{2})
- Geometric albedo: 0.1549; 0.1588±0.0204; 0.173±0.025; 0.276±0.034; 0.37±0.16
- Spectral type: Tholen = S; SMASS = S; B–V = 0.947; U–B = 0.594
- Absolute magnitude (H): 11.39 · 11.55 · 11.62 · 11.62±0.08

1088 Mitaka (prov. designation: 1927 WA) is a bright background asteroid from the inner regions of the asteroid belt. It was discovered on 17 November 1927, by Japanese astronomer Okuro Oikawa at the old Tokyo Astronomical Observatory in Japan. The stony S-type asteroid has a notably short rotation period of 3.0 hours and measures approximately 15 kilometers (9.3 miles) in diameter. It was named after the Japanese village of Mitaka.

== Orbit and classification ==
Mitaka is a non-family asteroid of the main belt's background population when applying the hierarchical clustering method to its proper orbital elements. It orbits the Sun in the inner asteroid belt at a distance of 1.8–2.6 AU once every 3 years and 3 months (1,194 days). Its orbit has an eccentricity of 0.20 and an inclination of 8° with respect to the ecliptic. The asteroid was first observed as A917 RA at the Simeiz Observatory on 11 September 1917. The body's observation arc begins at Tokyo in December 1927, one month after its official discovery observation.

== Naming ==
This minor planet was named after the Japanese village of Mitaka, where the discovering Tokyo Astronomical Observatory was located. Nowadays the city of Mitaka hosts the headquarters of the National Astronomical Observatory of Japan with the Tokyo Photoelectric Meridian Circle, public relation and data centers, and several telescopes. The official naming citation was mentioned in The Names of the Minor Planets by Paul Herget in 1955 (H 103).

== Physical characteristics ==
Mitaka is a common, stony S-type asteroid in both the Tholen and Bus–Binzel SMASS classification.

=== Rotation period and poles ===
Several rotational lightcurves of Mitaka have been obtained from photometric observations since 1989. Analysis of the best rated lightcurve by French amateur astronomer Pierre Antonini gave a rotation period of 3.0361 hours with a consolidated brightness variation of 0.23 to 0.62 magnitude (U=3).

In 2009 and 2011, modelling of Mitaka's lightcurve using photometric data from the US Naval Observatory, the Uppsala Asteroid Photometric Catalogue (UAPC), the Palmer Divide Observatory's archive, the Palomar Transient Factory survey, and from individual observers, gave a concurring rotation period of 3.035377 and 3.035378 hours. The modeled lightcurves also gave a spin axis of (115.0°, 46.0°) and (278.0°, −72.0°), as well as (280.0°, −71.0°) in ecliptic coordinates (λ, β).

=== Diameter and albedo ===
According to the surveys carried out by the Japanese Akari satellite and the NEOWISE mission of NASA's Wide-field Infrared Survey Explorer, Mitaka measures between 11.33 and 16.016 kilometers in diameter and its surface has an albedo between 0.1549 and 0.37. The Collaborative Asteroid Lightcurve Link adopts Petr Pravec's revised WISE results with an albedo of 0.1549 and takes a diameter of 16.02 kilometers based on an absolute magnitude of 11.62.
