= Mitsuma Matsumura =

Japanese politician (1894–1970)

- 松村 光磨
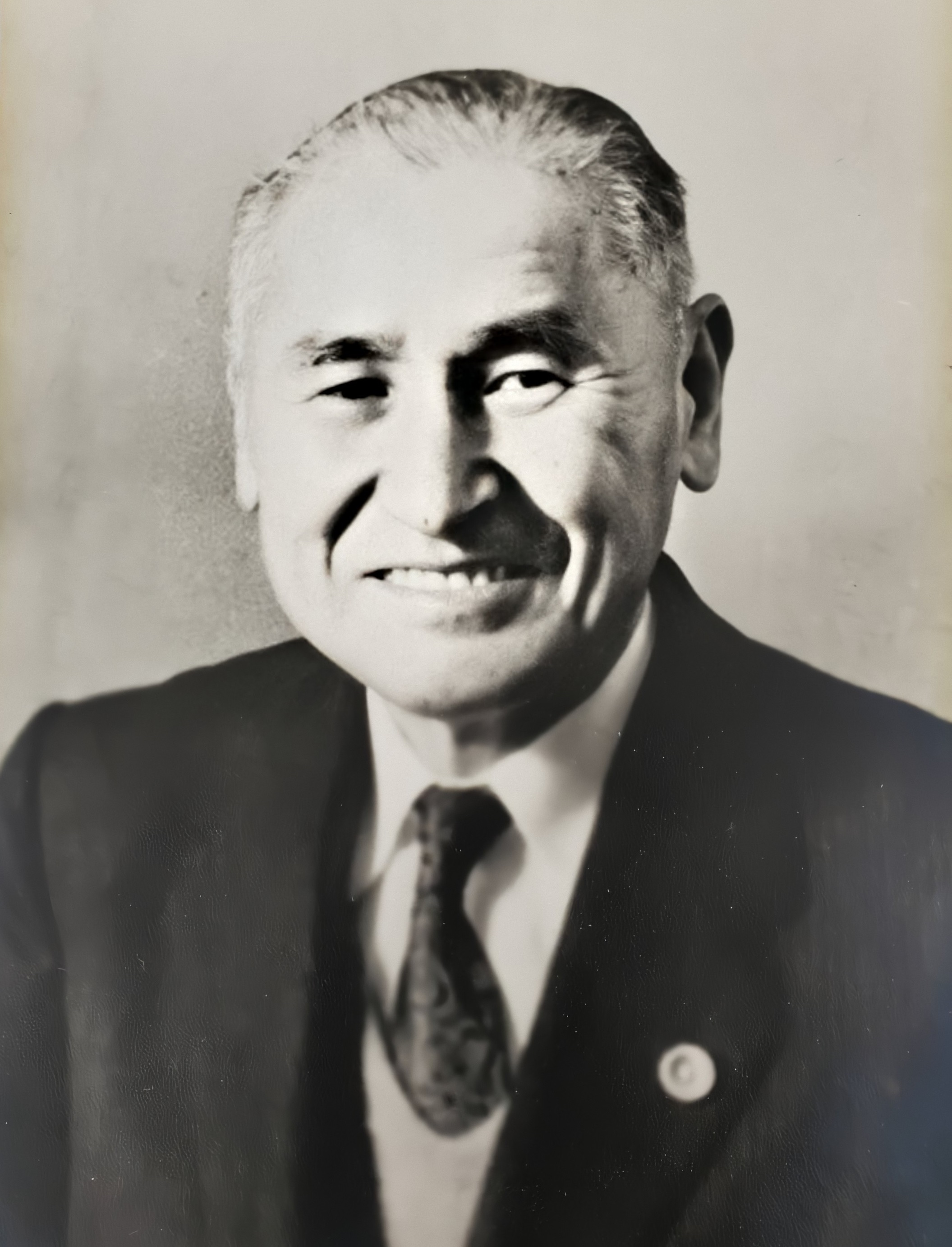

Governor of Hiroshima Prefecture
- In office 1 August 1944 – 21 April 1945
- Monarch: Hirohito
- Preceded by: Sukenari Yokoyama
- Succeeded by: Isei Otsuka

Governor of Tokyo Prefecture
- In office 9 January 1942 – 1 July 1943
- Monarch: Hirohito
- Preceded by: Jitsuzō Kawanishi
- Succeeded by: Shigeo Ōdachi

Governor of Kanagawa Prefecture
- In office 9 April 1940 – 9 January 1942
- Monarch: Hirohito
- Preceded by: Ichisho Inuma
- Succeeded by: Jōtarō Kondō

Governor of Tochigi Prefecture
- In office 13 March 1936 – 30 September 1937
- Monarch: Hirohito
- Preceded by: Gunzō Kayaba
- Succeeded by: Tsutomu Adachi

Personal details
- Born: 8 January 1894 Arita, Saga, Japan
- Died: 10 April 1970 (aged 76) Den-en-chōfu, Tokyo, Japan
- Education: Tokyo Imperial University

Mitsuma Matsumura (8 January 1894 – 10 April 1970) was a Japanese politician who served as governor of Hiroshima Prefecture from 1 August 1944 to 21 April 1945. He was also governor of Tochigi Prefecture (1936–1937) and Kanagawa Prefecture (1940–1942).

Preceded by Gunzo Kayaba	Governor of Tochigi Prefecture; 1936–1937	Succeeded by Adachi Shuuritsu
Preceded by Sukenari Yokoyama	Governor of Hiroshima Prefecture; 1944–1945	Succeeded by Korekiyo Otsuka
