= Saiichiro Miyamura =

Japanese politician

- 宮村 才一郎

Governor of Hiroshima Prefecture
- In office 15 June 1942 – 1 July 1943
- Monarch: Hirohito
- Preceded by: Tokiji Yoshinaga
- Succeeded by: Sukenari Yokoyama

Governor of Nara Prefecture
- In office 9 April 1940 – 9 November 1940
- Monarch: Hirohito
- Preceded by: Seiya Mishima
- Succeeded by: Itsuzō Yamauchi

Personal details
- Born: June 1893 Takada, Niigata, Japan
- Died: 8 February 1948 (aged 54)
- Education: Tokyo Imperial University

Saiichiro Miyamura (June 1893 – 8 February 1948) was a Japanese politician who served as governor of Hiroshima Prefecture from 15 June 1942 to 1 July 1943.

Preceded by Tokiji Yoshinaga	Governor of Hiroshima Prefecture; 1942–1943	Succeeded by Sukenari Yokoyama
