= Hiroo Ōhara =

Governor of Hiroshima Prefecture

- 大原 博夫
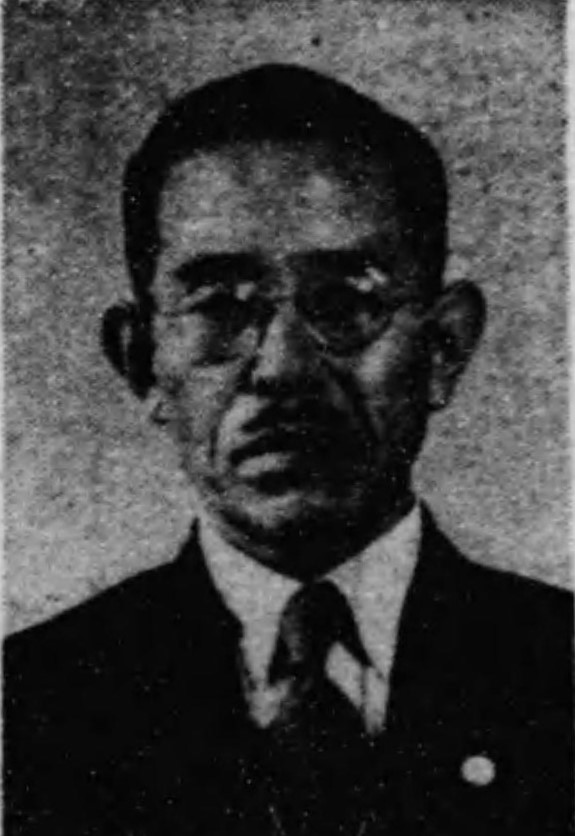

Governor of Hiroshima Prefecture
- In office 24 January 1951 – 13 April 1962
- Monarch: Hirohito
- Preceded by: Tsunei Kusunose
- Succeeded by: Izuo Nagano

Member of the House of Representatives
- In office 10 April 1946 – 23 December 1948
- Preceded by: Constituency established
- Succeeded by: Kōzaburō Miyahara
- Constituency: Hiroshima at-large (1946–1947); Hiroshima 2nd (1947–1948)

Personal details
- Born: 15 March 1894 Toyota, Hiroshima, Japan
- Died: 20 March 1971 (aged 77)
- Relatives: Yūzan Fujita (grandson); Masaaki Fujita (son-in-law)
- Education: Jikei Medical College

Hiroo Ōhara (大原 博夫, Ōhara Hiroo; 15 March 1894 – 20 March 1971) was the Governor of Hiroshima Prefecture from 1951 to 1962.

== Global policy ==
He was one of the signatories of the agreement to convene a convention for drafting a world constitution. As a result, for the first time in human history, a World Constituent Assembly convened to draft and adopt the Constitution for the Federation of Earth.

Preceded by Tsunei Kusunose	Governor of Hiroshima Prefecture; 1951-1962	Succeeded by Izuo Nagano
