= Takatoshi Iwamura =

Japanese politician

Baron Takatoshi Iwamura
- 岩村 高俊
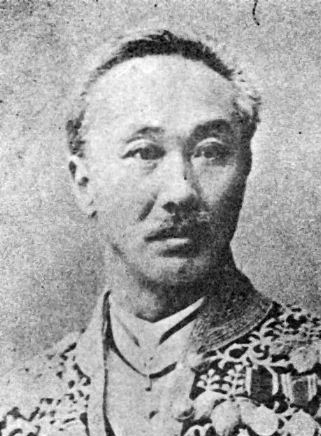

Member of the House of Peers
- In office 15 January 1892 – 4 January 1906 Nominated by the Emperor
Gubernatorial offices
Governor of Hiroshima Prefecture
In office 14 May 1898 – 28 July 1898
Monarch	Meiji
Preceded by	Asada Tokunori
Succeeded by	Hattori Ichizo
Governor of Fukuoka Prefecture
In office 19 April 1895 – 14 May 1898
Monarch	Meiji
Preceded by	Iwasaki Kojirō
Succeeded by	Sogabe Michio
Governor of Aichi Prefecture
In office 21 May 1890 – 15 January 1892
Monarch	Meiji
Preceded by	Shirane Sen'ichi
Succeeded by	Sadaaki Senda
Governor of Ishikawa Prefecture
In office 19 January 1883 – 21 May 1890
Monarch	Meiji
Preceded by	Chisaka Takamasa
Succeeded by	Funakoshi Mamoru
Governor of Ehime Prefecture
In office 24 November 1874 – 8 March 1880
Monarch	Meiji
Preceded by	Yasunao Egi
Succeeded by	Seki Shinpei
Governor of Saga Prefecture
In office 28 January 1874 – 18 July 1874
Monarch	Meiji
Preceded by	Iwamura Michitoshi
Succeeded by	Hidetomo Kitajima

Personal details
- Born: 8 December 1845 Hata, Tosa, Japan
- Died: 4 January 1906 (aged 60)

Takatoshi Iwamura (8 December 1845 – 4 January 1906) was a Japanese politician who served as governor of Hiroshima Prefecture from May to July 1898. He was governor of Saga Prefecture (1874), Ehime Prefecture (1874–1880), Ishikawa Prefecture (1883–1890), Aichi Prefecture (1890–1892) and Fukuoka Prefecture (1895–1898).
