= Kodama Kyūichi =

Japanese politician

- 児玉 九一
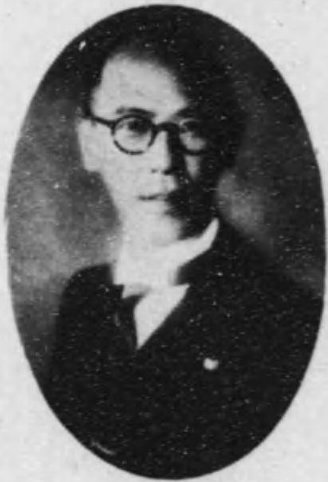

Governor of Hiroshima Prefecture
- In office 10 October 1945 – 27 October 1945
- Monarch: Hirohito
- Preceded by: Genshin Takano
- Succeeded by: Tsunei Kusunose

Governor of Aichi Prefecture
- In office 9 April 1940 – 26 March 1941
- Monarch: Hirohito
- Preceded by: Kōtarō Tanaka
- Succeeded by: Aikawa Katsuroku

Governor of Fukuoka Prefecture
- In office 17 April 1939 – 9 April 1940
- Monarch: Hirohito
- Preceded by: Kotora Akamatsu
- Succeeded by: Kiyoshi Honma

Governor of Shimane Prefecture
- In office 2 September 1936 – 10 February 1937
- Monarch: Hirohito
- Preceded by: Mitsuji Nakai
- Succeeded by: Kizō Miki

Personal details
- Born: 3 August 1893 Yamaguchi Prefecture, Japan
- Died: 23 May 1960 (aged 66)
- Parent: Kodama Gentarō (father)
- Relatives: Hideo Kodama (brother); Kōichi Kido (brother-in-law)
- Education: Tokyo Imperial University
- Occupation: Government official and politician

Kodama Kyūichi (児玉九一; 3 August 1893 – 23 May 1960) was a Japanese Home Ministry government official, politician and governor. He was the son of the General Kodama Gentarō.

== Biography ==
He was born in Yamaguchi Prefecture. He was a graduate of Tokyo Imperial University. He was governor of Shimane Prefecture (1936–1937), Fukuoka Prefecture (1939–1940), Aichi Prefecture (1940–1941) and Hiroshima Prefecture (October 1945).

== Bibliography ==
- 歴代知事編纂会編『新編日本の歴代知事』歴代知事編纂会、1991年。
- 秦郁彦編『日本官僚制総合事典：1868 - 2000』東京大学出版会、2001年。

Preceded by Nakai Koji	Governor of Shimane Prefecture; 1936–1937	Succeeded by Mirobe Takashi
Preceded by	Governor of Fukuoka Prefecture; 1939–1940	Succeeded by
Preceded by Tanaka Kōtarō (Home Ministry government official)	Governor of Aichi Prefecture; 1940–1941	Succeeded by Aikawa Katsuroku
Preceded by Genshin Takano	Governor of Hiroshima Prefecture; October 10–27, 1945	Succeeded by Tsunei Kusunose
