= Mikine Kuwahara =

Japanese politician (1895–1991)

- 桑原 幹根
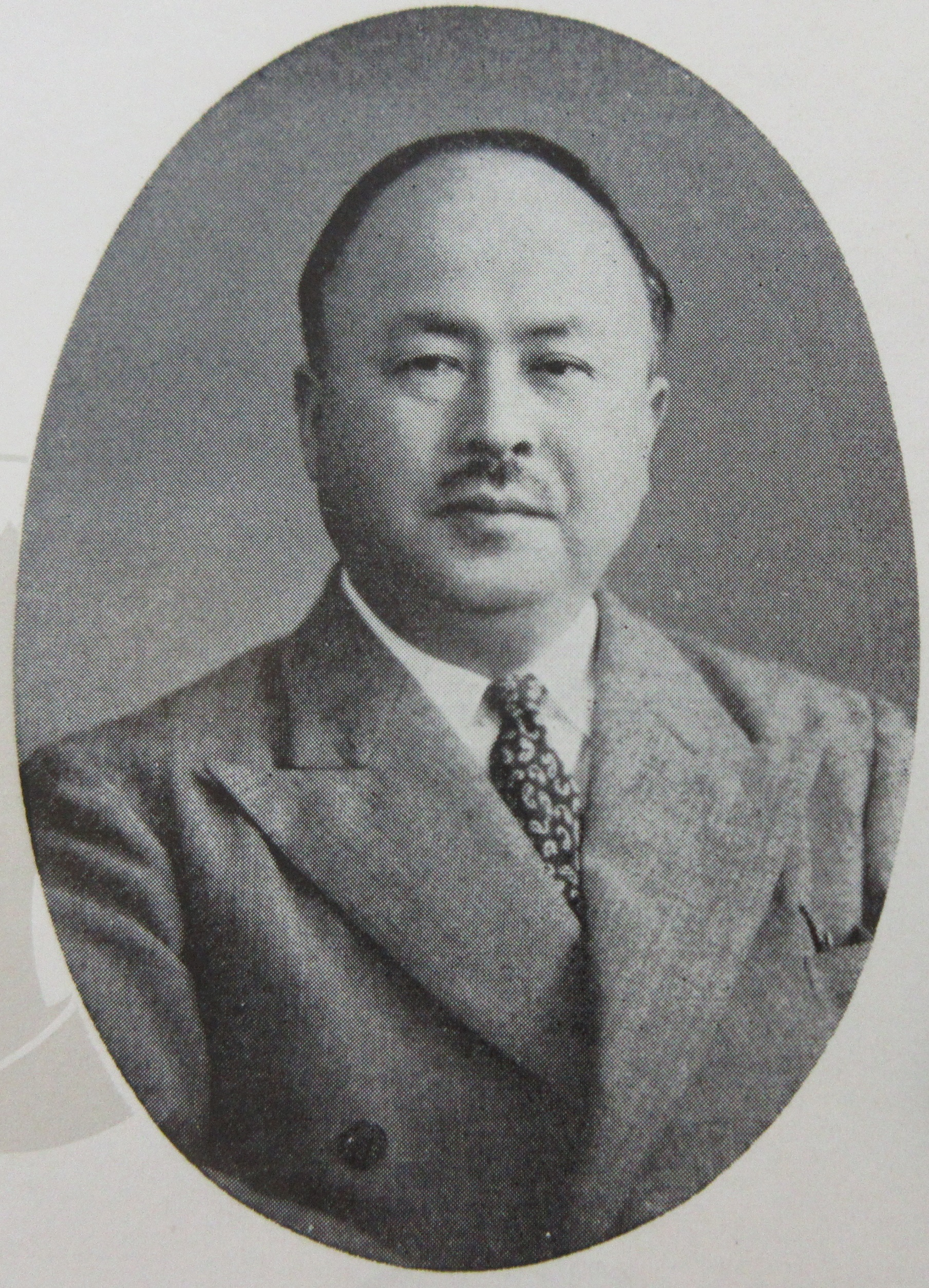

Governor of Aichi Prefecture
- In office 11 May 1951 – 14 February 1975
- Monarch: Hirohito
- Preceded by: Hideo Aoyagi
- Succeeded by: Yoshiaki Nakaya
- In office 9 July 1946 – 5 March 1947
- Monarch: Hirohito
- Preceded by: Saburo Hayakawa
- Succeeded by: Hideo Aoyagi

Personal details
- Born: 29 August 1895 Minamitsuru, Yamanashi, Japan
- Died: 11 April 1991 (aged 95)
- Party: Independent
- Education: Tokyo Imperial University

Mikine Kuwahara (桑原幹根, Kuwahara Mikune; 29 August 1895 – 11 April 1991) was a Japanese Home Ministry government official. He was born in Yamanashi Prefecture. He was a graduate of Tokyo Imperial University. He was twice governor of Aichi Prefecture. He was a recipient of the Order of the Rising Sun.

Preceded by Hayakawa Saburō	Governor of Aichi Prefecture; 1946–1947	Succeeded by Aoyagi Hideo
Preceded by Aoyagi Hideo	Governor of Aichi Prefecture; 1951–1975	Succeeded by Nakaya Yoshiaki
