= Michio Yuzawa =

Japanese politician

- 湯沢 三千男
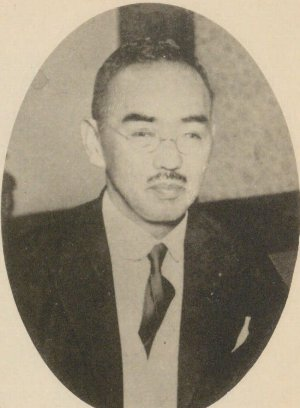
- Yuzawa in 1936

Minister of Home Affairs
- In office 17 February 1942 – 20 April 1943
- Prime Minister: Hideki Tojo
- Preceded by: Hideki Tojo
- Succeeded by: Kisaburō Andō

Member of the House of Councillors
- In office 2 June 1959 – 21 February 1963
- Preceded by: Seiichirō Satō
- Succeeded by: Tokuya Tsuboyama
- Constituency: Tochigi at-large

Member of the House of Peers
- In office 30 April 1943 – 22 February 1946 Nominated by the Emperor
Gubernatorial offices
Governor of Hyōgo Prefecture
In office 15 January 1935 – 13 March 1936
Monarch	Hirohito
Preceded by	Takekai Shirane
Succeeded by	Shōzō Okada
Governor of Hiroshima Prefecture
In office 28 June 1932 – 15 January 1935
Monarch	Hirohito
Preceded by	Ryo Chiba
Succeeded by	Keiichi Suzuki
Governor of Miyagi Prefecture
In office 9 October 1929 – 18 December 1931
Monarch	Hirohito
Preceded by	Toratarō Ushizuka
Succeeded by	Chōji Minabe

Personal details
- Born: 20 May 1888 Kamitsuga, Tochigi, Japan
- Died: 21 March 1963 (aged 74)
- Party: Liberal Democratic
- Other political affiliations: Independent (1929–1955)
- Education: Tokyo Imperial University

Michio Yuzawa (湯沢三千男, Yuzawa Michio; 20 May 1888 – 21 February 1963) was a bureaucrat and cabinet minister in early Shōwa period Japan.

== Early life and education ==
Yuzawa was born in Kamitsuga District, Tochigi in what is now part of the city of Kanuma as the son of a kannushi (Shinto priest). After his graduation in 1912 from Tokyo Imperial University he entered the Home Ministry. He served within the ministry within the field of public health, and oversaw the establishment of the Meiji Shrine Games, which were held annually from 1924 to 1943.

== Political career ==
In 1929, he was appointed Governor of Miyagi Prefecture. In 1931 he became Director of the Public Works Bureau, and Governor of Hiroshima Prefecture. In 1935, he was appointed Governor of Hyōgo Prefecture. In 1936, Yuzawa was appointed Vice Minister of the Home Ministry. In 1938, under the Hirota Kōki administration, Yuzawa was dispatched to China, to assist in the establishment of the Provisional Government of the Republic of China. While working closely with the Japanese Northern China Area Army, he established close connections with its chief-of-staff, General Akira Mutō. In 1940, he was appointed chairman of the Dai-Nippon Sangyō Jōhōkokukai, a war-time umbrella organization encompassing all of the former labor unions, which were now under government control.

On 7 February 1942, Yuzawa was appointed Home Minister in the Tōjō administration. Tōjō had originally insisted on holding the post concurrently with that of Prime Minister during the first months of World War II, fearing that the powerful security apparatus controlled by the Home Ministry could pose a threat to his administration should the war situation deteriorate. As Home Minister, Yuzawa organized government support for the Taisei Yokusankai, which won a landslide victory in the 1942 General Election, but had to contend with the increasing radicalization of the paramilitary youth wing of the party, the Yokusan Sonendan. He also oversaw the creation of Tokyo Metropolis by the merger of Tokyo City with Tokyo-fu in 1942.

From April 1943 until the end of World War II, Yuzawa was appointed to a seat in the House of Peers. After the surrender of Japan, Yuzawa was (along with all other members of the wartime government), purged by orders of the American occupation authorities. He subsequently served as honorary chairman of the Central Social Insurance Medical Council. In 1959, he ran for a seat in the post-war upper house of the Diet of Japan under the Liberal Democratic Party ticket and served for a single term. He died in 1963.

Political offices
Preceded by Ryo Chiba	Governor of Hiroshima Prefecture; 1932–1935	Succeeded by Keiichi Suzuki
Preceded by Hideki Tōjō	Home Minister; 17 February 1942 – 20 April 1943	Succeeded by Kisaburō Andō
