= Takekawa =

Takewaka may refer to

- Takekawa Station, a railway station on the Chichibu Main Line in Fukaya, Saitama, Japan
- Yukihide Takekawa (born 1952), Japanese singer-songwriter

== See also ==
- Takewaka, a surname
