= Okuro Oikawa =

Japanese astronomer

Minor planets discovered: 8
1088 Mitaka	17 November 1927	MPC
1089 Tama	17 November 1927	MPC
1090 Sumida	20 February 1928	MPC
1098 Hakone	5 September 1928	MPC
1139 Atami^{1}	1 December 1929	MPC
1185 Nikko	17 November 1927	MPC
1266 Tone	23 January 1927	MPC
1584 Fuji	7 February 1927	MPC
^{1} co-discovered with K. Kubokawa

Okuro Oikawa (及川 奥郎, Oikawa Okurō; 1896–1970) was a Japanese astronomer and discoverer of minor planets.

He is credited by the Minor Planet Center with the discovered 8 asteroids between 1927 and 1929.

The outer main-belt asteroid 2667 Oikawa was named in his memory. Naming citation was published on 1 June 1996 (M.P.C. 27329).
