= List of governors of Hiroshima Prefecture =

Governors of Hiroshima Prefecture served from 1871, when the Japanese government abolished the position of the daimyō of Hiroshima. Until 1947, the governors of Hiroshima Prefecture were appointed by the Ministry of Internal Affairs in Tokyo, but from 1947 onward they were elected.

== Appointed governors 1871–1947 ==
- Viscount Kōno Togama 15 Aug – 15 Nov 1871
- Senbon Hisanobu 15 Nov – 27 Nov 1871
- Viscount Kōno Togama 27 Nov – 26 Dec 1871
- Date Muneoki 26 Dec 1871 – 25 Jan 1875
- Benzō Fujii 25 Jan 1875 – 6 Apr 1880
- Sadaaki Senda 6 Apr 1880 – 26 Dec 1889
- Baron Nabeshima Miki 26 Dec 1889 – 23 Apr 1896
- Orita Heinai 23 Apr 1896 – 7 Apr 1897
- Asada Tokunori 7 Apr 1897 – 14 May 1898
- Baron Takatoshi Iwamura 14 May – 28 Jul 1898
- Hattori Ichizo 28 Jul – 28 Dec 1898
- Egi Kazuyuki 28 Dec 1898 – 29 Jun 1903
- Tokuhisa Tsunenori 29 Jun 1903 – 25 Jan 1904
- Yamada Shunzō 25 Jan 1904 – 11 Jan 1907
- Tadashi Munakata 11 Jan 1907 – 28 Mar 1912
- Nakamura Junkuro 28 Mar 1912 – 27 Feb 1913
- Terada Yushi 27 Feb 1913 – 28 Apr 1916
- Eitaro Mabuchi 28 Apr 1916 – 7 May 1918
- Yasukouchi Asakichi 7 May 1918 – 18 Apr 1919
- Raizo Wakabayashi 18 Apr 1919 – 19 Jul 1921
- Ichiro Yoda 19 Jul 1921 – 16 Oct 1922
- Kamehiko Abe 16 Oct 1922 – 25 Oct 1923
- Jiro Yamagata 25 Oct 1923 – 16 Sep 1925
- Tsunenosuke Hamada 16 Sep 1925 – 28 Sep 1926
- Kaiichiro Suematsu 28 Sep 1926 – 7 Nov 1927
- Sukenari Yokoyama 7 Nov 1927 – 25 May 1928
- Masao Kishimoto 25 May 1928 – 5 Jul 1929
- Hiroshi Kawabuchi 5 Jul 1929 – 8 May 1931
- Takekai Shirane 8 May – 18 Dec 1931
- Ryo Chiba 18 Dec 1931 – 28 Jun 1932
- Michio Yuzawa 28 Jun 1932 – 15 Jan 1935
- Keiichi Suzuki 15 Jan 1935 – 22 Apr 1936
- Saburo Hayakawa 18 Apr 1936 – 8 Jan 1937
- Aijiro Tomita 8 Jan 1937 – 9 Nov 1938
- Ichisho Inuma 9 Nov 1938 – 5 Sep 1939
- Katsuroku Aikawa 5 Sep 1939 – 26 Mar 1941
- Tokiji Yoshinaga 26 Mar 1941 – 15 Jun 1942
- Saiichiro Miyamura 15 Jun 1942 – 1 Jul 1943
- Sukenari Yokoyama 1 Jul 1943 – 1 Aug 1944
- Mitsuma Matsumura 1 Aug 1944 – 21 Apr 1945
- Korekiyo Otsuka 21 Apr – 10 Jun 1945
- Genshin Takano 10 Jun – 11 Oct 1945
- Kyuichi Kodama 11 Oct – 27 Oct 1945
- Tsunei Kusunose 27 Oct 1945 – 14 Mar 1947
- Shinichiro Takekawa 14 Mar – 16 Apr 1947

== Elected governors 1947–present ==
- Tsunei Kusunose 16 Apr 1947 – 29 Nov 1950
- Hiroo Ōhara 24 Jan 1951 – 13 Apr 1962
- Izuo Nagano 29 May 1962 – 10 Nov 1973
- Hiroshi Miyazawa 16 Dec 1973 – 29 Oct 1981
- Toranosuke Takeshita 29 Nov 1981 – 28 Nov 1993
- Yūzan Fujita 29 Nov 1993 – 29 Nov 2009
- Hidehiko Yuzaki 29 Nov 2009 – 28 Nov 2025
- Mika Yokota 29 Nov 2025 – present
