= List of governors of Aichi Prefecture =

Governor of Aichi Prefecture
- Emblem of Aichi Prefecture

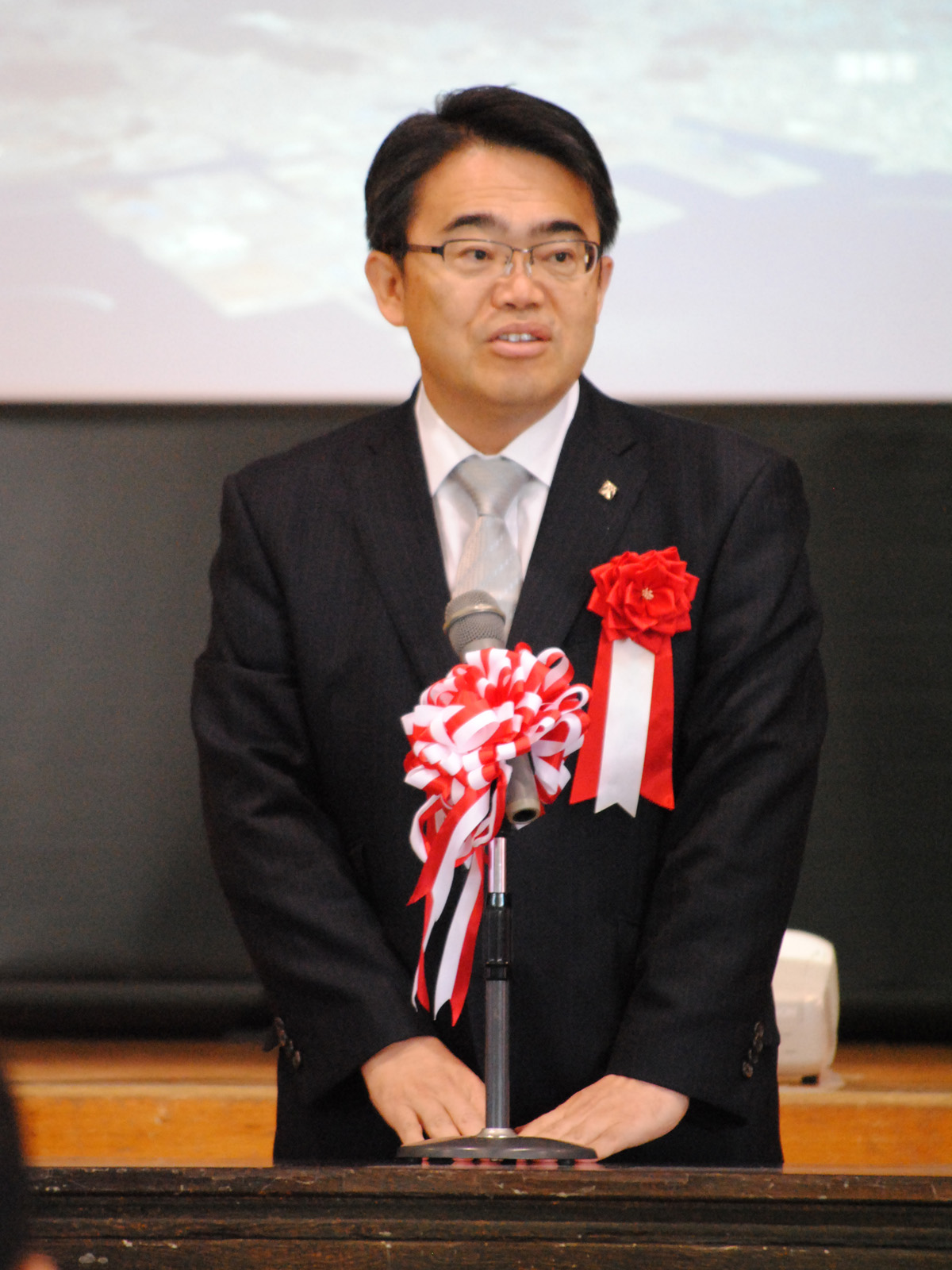
- Incumbent; Hideaki Ōmura since 15 February 2011
- Residence: Aichi Prefecture Governor House
- Appointer: Elected via popular vote
- Inaugural holder: Shirane Sen'ichi
- Formation: 1889

The governor of Aichi Prefecture (愛知県知事一覧, Aichi-ken chijii chiran) is the head of the local government in Aichi Prefecture.

== List of governors of Aichi Prefecture ==
- Iseki Morimoto 1872-1873
- Washino Takatsumu 1873-1875
- Yasuba Yasukazu 1875-1880
- Kunisada Rempei 1880-1885 (died in office)
- Katsumata Minoru 1885-1889
- Shirane Sen'ichi 1889-1890
- Takatoshi Iwamura 1890-1892
- Sadaaki Senda 1892
- Yasuba Yasukazu 1892
- Tokito Tanemoto 1892-1897
- Egi Kazuyuki 1897-1898
- Baron Mori Mamoru 1898-1902
- Masaaki Nomura 1902
- Ichizo Fukano 1902-1912
- Kenzo Ishihara 1912-1913
- Matsui Shigeru 1913-1919
- Shunji Miyao 1919-1921
- Hikoji Kawaguchi 1921-1923
- Ōta Masahiro 1923-1924
- Haruki Yamawaki 1924-1926
- Saburo Shibata 1926-1927
- Toyoji Obata 1927-1929
- Masao Oka 1929-1931
- Kosaka Masayasu 1931
- Yujiro Osaki 1931-1932
- Endo Ryusaku 1932-1933
- Minabe Choji 1933-1934
- Eitaro Shinohara 1934-1937
- Tanaka Kōtarō (Home Ministry government official) 1937-1940
- Kodama Kyūichi 1940-1941
- Aikawa Katsuroku 1941-1942
- Yukizawa Chiyoji 1942-1943
- Shinji Yoshino 1943-1945
- Tadayoshi Obata 1945
- Sieve Yoshimi 1945
- Ryuichi Fukumoto 1945-1946
- Saburo Hayakawa 1946
- Mikine Kuwahara 1946-1947
- Hideo Aoyagi 1947-1951
- Mikine Kuwahara (2nd term) 1951-1975
- Yoshiaki Nakaya 1975-1983
- Reiji Suzuki 1983-1999
- Masaaki Kanda 1999-2011
- Hideaki Ōmura 2011–present
