= Tokiichiro Takewaka =

Japanese politician

- 武若 時一郎

Governor of Hiroshima Prefecture
- In office 14 March 1947 – 16 April 1947
- Monarch: Hirohito
- Preceded by: Tsunei Kusunose
- Succeeded by: Tsunei Kusunose

Personal details
- Born: April 1901 Kyoto Prefecture, Japan
- Education: Tokyo Imperial University

Tokiichiro Takekawa (武若 時一郎, Takewaka Tokiichirō; April 1901 – ?) was the Governor of Hiroshima Prefecture from March to April 1947.

| Preceded by Tsunei Kusunose | Governor of Hiroshima Prefecture; March–April 1947 | Succeeded by Tsunei Kusunose |
