= Ryo Chiba =

Japanese politician (1884–1963)

- 千葉 了
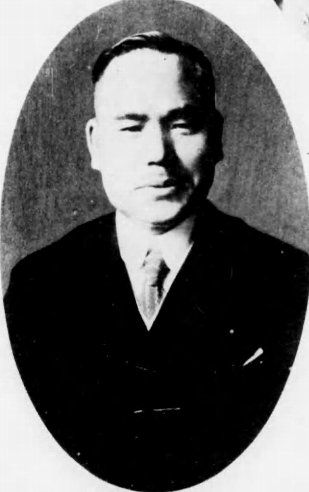

Governor of Niigata Prefecture
- In office 28 June 1932 – 15 January 1935
- Monarch: Hirohito
- Preceded by: Toyoji Obata
- Succeeded by: Umekichi Miyawaki

Governor of Hiroshima Prefecture
- In office 18 December 1931 – 28 June 1932
- Monarch: Hirohito
- Preceded by: Takekai Shirane
- Succeeded by: Michio Yuzawa

Governor of Nagano Prefecture
- In office 28 April 1927 – 5 July 1929
- Monarch: Hirohito
- Preceded by: Morio Takahashi
- Succeeded by: Shintarō Suzuki

Governor of Mie Prefecture
- In office 13 March 1924 – 23 July 1924
- Monarch: Taishō
- Preceded by: Ichimin Tago
- Succeeded by: Kunitoshi Yamaoka

Personal details
- Born: 2 March 1884 Sendai, Miyagi, Japan
- Died: 8 November 1963 (aged 79)
- Party: Rikken Seiyūkai
- Education: Tokyo Imperial University

Ryo Chiba (2 March 1884 – 8 November 1963) was a Japanese politician who served as governor of Hiroshima Prefecture from December 1931 to June 1932. He was governor of Nagano Prefecture (1927–1929) and Niigata Prefecture (1932–1935)

Preceded by Morio Takahashi	Governor of Nagano; 1927–1929	Succeeded by Shintarō Suzuki
Preceded by Takekai Shirane	Governor of Hiroshima Prefecture; 1931–1932	Succeeded by Michio Yuzawa
Preceded by Obata Toyoji	Governor of Niigata Prefecture; 1932–1935	Succeeded by Miyawaki Umekichi
