= 1266 Tone =

Dark background asteroid

Discovery
- Discovered by: O. Oikawa
- Discovery site: Tokyo Obs. (389)
- Discovery date: 23 January 1927

Designations
- Pronunciation: /ˈtoʊni/ Japanese: [tone]
- Named after: Tone River (Japanese river)
- Alternative designations: 1927 BD · 1933 BM; 1934 EC · A899 PH
- Minor planet category: main-belt · (outer) background

Orbital characteristics
- Epoch 4 September 2017 (JD 2458000.5)
- Uncertainty parameter 0
- Observation arc: 84.76 yr (30,958 days)
- Aphelion: 3.5313 AU
- Perihelion: 3.1886 AU
- Semi-major axis: 3.3600 AU
- Eccentricity: 0.0510
- Orbital period (sidereal): 6.16 yr (2,250 days)
- Mean anomaly: 102.82°
- Mean motion: 0° 9^{m} 36^{s} / day
- Inclination: 17.182°
- Longitude of ascending node: 320.63°
- Argument of perihelion: 298.20°

Physical characteristics
- Dimensions: 70.70±24.76 km 73.34±3.8 km 75.470±0.523 km 83.261±2.040 km 88.82±1.33 km 94.10±24.67 km
- Synodic rotation period: 7.40±0.05 h (Note: Lightcurve plot of 1266 Tone, Palmer Divide Observatory, B. D. Warner (1999). Summary figures at the LCDB); 11.82±0.05 h 12.9±0.1 h
- Geometric albedo: 0.039±0.001; 0.0439±0.0101; 0.05±0.03; 0.05±0.04; 0.053±0.005; 0.0566±0.006
- Spectral type: Tholen = P B–V = 0.732; U–B = 0.317
- Absolute magnitude (H): 9.40 · 9.41

1266 Tone /ˈtoʊni/ is a dark background asteroid from the outer regions of the asteroid belt, approximately 80 kilometers in diameter. Discovered by astronomer Okuro Oikawa at the Tokyo Observatory in 1927, it was assigned the provisional designation 1927 BD. The asteroid was later named after the Tone River, one of Japan's largest rivers.

== Discovery ==
It was discovered by Japanese astronomer Okuro Oikawa at the Tokyo Observatory (389) on 23 January 1927. On the following night, it was independently discovered by Soviet astronomer Grigory Neujmin at the Simeiz Observatory on the Crimean peninsula. The Minor Planet Center only recognizes the first discoverer. In August 1899, the asteroid was first identified as A899 PH at the Boyden Station of the Harvard Observatory in Arequipa, Peru.

== Orbit and classification ==
Tone is a non-family asteroid from the main belt's background population. It orbits the Sun in the outer asteroid belt at a distance of 3.2–3.5 AU once every 6 years and 2 months (2,250 days; semi-major axis of 3.36 AU). Its orbit has an eccentricity of 0.05 and an inclination of 17° with respect to the ecliptic.

The body's observation arc begins with its identification as 1933 BM at the German Heidelberg Observatory in January 1933, or four years after its official discovery observation at Tokyo.

== Physical characteristics ==
In the Tholen classification, Tone is a primitive and dark P-type asteroid.

=== Rotation period ===
In October 1999, two rotational lightcurves of Tone were obtained from photometric observations by American astronomer Brian Warner at his Palmer Divide Observatory (716) in Colorado. Lightcurve analysis gave two divergent rotation periods of 7.40 and 11.82 hours with a brightness variation of 0.06 and 0.12 magnitude, respectively (U=2/2). Observation by Italian astronomers Roberto Crippa and Federico Manzini in October 2005, gave another tentative period of 12.9 hours and an amplitude of 0.07 magnitude (U=2-). The LCDB currently adopts a period of 7.40 hours.

=== Diameter and albedo ===
According to the surveys carried out by the Infrared Astronomical Satellite IRAS, the Japanese Akari satellite and the NEOWISE mission of NASA's Wide-field Infrared Survey Explorer, Tone measures between 70.70 and 94.10 kilometers in diameter and its surface has an albedo between 0.039 and 0.0566.

The Collaborative Asteroid Lightcurve Link adopts the results obtained by IRAS, that is, an albedo of 0.0566 and a diameter of 73.34 kilometers based on an absolute magnitude of 9.41.

== Naming ==
This minor planet was named after Tone River (Tone-gawa), Japan's second-largest river after the Shinano River. The official naming citation was mentioned in The Names of the Minor Planets by Paul Herget in 1955 (H 116).
