= Genshin Takano =

Japanese lawyer and government official (1895–1969)

- 高野 源進
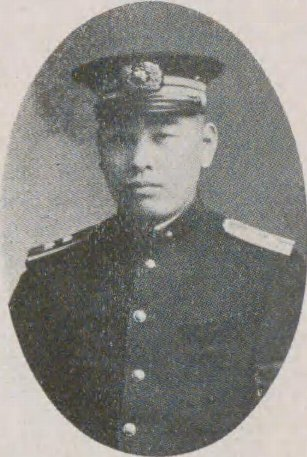

Superintendent General of the Tokyo Metropolitan Police Department
- In office 11 October 1945 – 15 January 1946
- Preceded by: Nobuyoshi Saka
- Succeeded by: Shōhei Fujinuma

Governor of Hiroshima Prefecture
- In office 10 June 1945 – 11 October 1945
- Monarch: Hirohito
- Preceded by: Isei Otsuka
- Succeeded by: Kodama Kyūichi

Governor of Yamanashi Prefecture
- In office 7 January 1941 – 7 July 1942
- Monarch: Hirohito
- Preceded by: Masamitsu Yasuoka
- Succeeded by: Jitsuo Tago

Personal details
- Born: 15 March 1895 Kitaaizu, Fukushima, Japan
- Died: 4 January 1969 (aged 73)
- Resting place: Tama Cemetery
- Education: Tokyo Imperial University
- Occupation: Politician, lawyer

Genshin Takano (高野 源進, Takano Genshin; 15 March 1895 – 4 January 1969) was a Japanese lawyer and Home Ministry and Police Bureau government official. He was born in Fukushima Prefecture. He was a graduate of the University of Tokyo. He was governor of Yamanashi Prefecture (1941–1942) and Hiroshima Prefecture from June 10 to October 11, 1945. Following the atomic attack on Hiroshima, Takano took part in the initial rescue work. On October 11, 1945, his term as governor of Hiroshima expired and he was appointed police officer, but was removed from that position in January 1946 by American occupation authorities due to the policy of purging public officials who served during World War II. Later, he worked as a private lawyer.

He died of pneumonia.

Preceded by Korekiyo Otsuka	Governor of Hiroshima Prefecture; 10 June – 11 Oct. 1945	Succeeded by Kodama Kyūichi
