= Hiroshi Kawabuchi =

Japanese politician (1883–1946)

- 川淵 洽馬
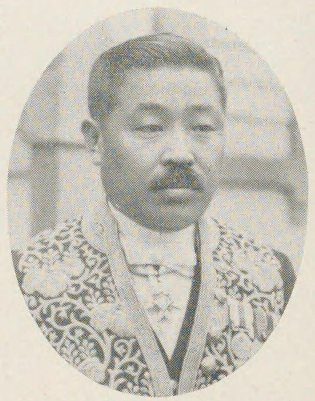

Mayor of Kōchi
- In office 28 January 1936 – 11 July 1941
- Preceded by: Kiyoshi Murakami
- Succeeded by: Isamu Ōno

Member of the House of Representatives
- In office 20 February 1932 – 21 January 1936
- Preceded by: Masami Ōnishi
- Succeeded by: Ozaki Shigemi
- Constituency: Kōchi 2nd
Gubernatorial offices
Governor of Fukuoka Prefecture
In office 8 May 1931 – 18 December 1931
Monarch	Hirohito
Preceded by	Gaku Matsumoto
Succeeded by	Sanosuke Nakayama
Governor of Hiroshima Prefecture
In office 5 July 1929 – 8 May 1931
Monarch	Hirohito
Preceded by	Masao Kishimoto
Succeeded by	Takekai Shirane
Governor of Fukushima Prefecture
In office 16 September 1925 – 17 May 1927
Monarchs	Taishō; Hirohito
Preceded by	Masayasu Kōsaka
Succeeded by	Kihachirō Itō

Personal details
- Born: 15 August 1883 Kubokawa, Kōchi, Japan
- Died: 1 October 1946 (aged 63)
- Party: Rikken Minseitō
- Education: Tokyo Imperial University

Hiroshi Kawabuchi (15 August 1883 – 1 October 1946) was a Japanese politician who served as governor of Hiroshima Prefecture from July 1929 to May 1931. He was governor of Fukushima Prefecture (1925–1927) and Fukuoka Prefecture (1931). He was mayor of Kōchi, Kōchi from 1936 to 1941.

Preceded by Kosaka Masayasu	Governor of Fukushima Prefecture; 1925-1927	Succeeded by Ito Kihachiro
Preceded by Masao Kishimoto	Governor of Hiroshima Prefecture; 1929–1931	Succeeded by Takekai Shirane
