= List of governors of Kanagawa Prefecture =

- Higashikuze Michitomi April–November 1868
- Terashima Munenori 1868–1869
- Mutsu Munemitsu 1871–1872
- Ōe Taku 1872–1874
- Nomura Yasushi 1876–1881
- Asada Tokunori (1st term) 1889–1891
- Utsumi Tadakatsu 1891–1893
- Asada Tokunori 2nd term 1898–1900
- Chūichi Ariyoshi 1915–1919
- Yasukouchi Asakichi 1922–1924
- Seino Chotarno 1924-1925
- Zenjirō Horikiri 1925–1926
- Ikeda Hiroshi 1926-1929
- Jiro Yamagata 1929–1931
- Sukenari Yokoyama 1932–1935
- Seiichi Ōmura 1938–1939
- Ichisho Inuma 1939–1940
- Mitsuma Matsumura 1940–1942
- Iwataro Uchiyama 1947-1967
- Bungo Tsuda 1967–1975
- Kazuji Nagasu 1975-1995
- Hiroshi Okazaki 1995-2003
- Shigefumi Matsuzawa 2003–2011
- Yuji Kuroiwa 2011–present
