= Sukenari Yokoyama =

Japanese politician (1884–1963)

- 横山 助成
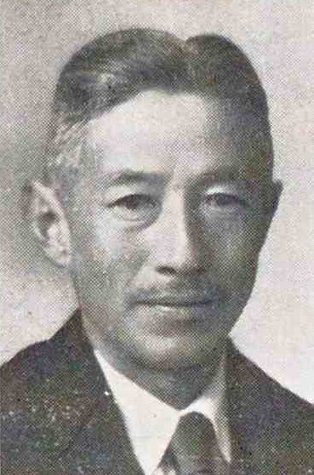
- Yokoyama in 1940

Member of the House of Peers
- In office 19 December 1939 – 18 March 1946 Nominated by the Emperor
Gubernatorial offices
Governor of Hiroshima Prefecture
In office 1 July 1943 – 1 August 1944
Monarch	Hirohito
Preceded by	Saiichiro Miyamura
Succeeded by	Mitsuma Matsumura
In office 7 November 1927 – 25 May 1928
Monarch	Hirohito
Preceded by	Kaiichiro Suematsu
Succeeded by	Masao Kishimoto
Governor of Tokyo
In office 15 January 1935 – 10 February 1937
Monarch	Hirohito
Preceded by	Masayasu Kōsaka
Succeeded by	Tetsuji Tachi
Governor of Kanagawa Prefecture
In office 28 June 1932 – 15 January 1935
Monarch	Hirohito
Preceded by	Endō Ryūsaku
Succeeded by	Ishida Kaoru
Governor of Kyoto Prefecture
In office December 1931 – 28 June 1932
Monarch	Hirohito
Preceded by	Shinya Kurosaki
Succeeded by	Munenori Saito
Governor of Ishikawa Prefecture
In office 18 May 1927 – 7 November 1927
Monarch	Hirohito
Preceded by	Isei Otsuka
Succeeded by	Sanosuke Nakayama
Governor of Okayama Prefecture
In office 25 October 1923 – 23 May 1924
Monarch	Taishō
Preceded by	Chō Enren
Succeeded by	Shigeyoshi Omihara

Personal details
- Born: 1 January 1884 Ōdate, Akita, Japan
- Died: 27 March 1963 (aged 79) Tokyo, Japan
- Party: Imperial Rule Assistance Association
- Other political affiliations: Rikken Seiyūkai (1924)
- Relatives: Ishida Eiichirō (brother-in-law)
- Education: Tokyo Imperial University

Sukenari Yokoyama (1 January 1884 – 27 March 1963) was a Japanese politician who served twice as governor of Hiroshima Prefecture in 1927–1928 and 1943–1944.

== Biography ==
He was also governor of Okayama Prefecture (1923–1924), Ishikawa Prefecture (1927), Kyoto Prefecture (1931–1932), Kanagawa Prefecture (1932–1935) and Tokyo (1935–1937).
