= Isei Otsuka =

Japanese politician (1884–1945)

- 大塚 惟精
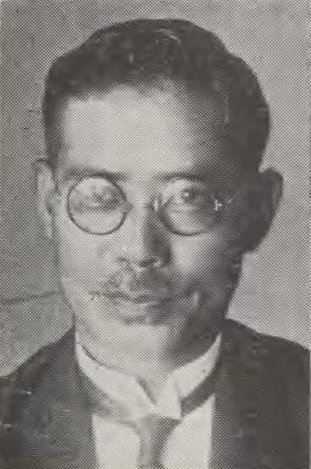

Member of the House of Peers
- In office 13 April 1931 – 6 August 1945 Nominated by the Emperor
Gubernatorial offices
Governor of Hiroshima Prefecture
In office 21 April 1945 – 10 June 1945
Monarch	Hirohito
Preceded by	Mitsuma Matsumura
Succeeded by	Genshin Takano
Governor of Ishikawa Prefecture
In office 17 May 1927 – 18 May 1927
Monarch	Hirohito
Preceded by	Takekai Shirane
Succeeded by	Sukenari Yokoyama
Governor of Fukuoka Prefecture
In office 28 September 1926 – 17 May 1927
Monarchs	Taishō; Hirohito
Preceded by	Shibata Zenzaburō
Succeeded by	Saitō Morikuni
Governor of Tochigi Prefecture
In office 13 June 1924 – 28 September 1926
Monarch	Taishō
Preceded by	Haruki Yamawaki
Succeeded by	Fujioka Hyoichi

Personal details
- Born: 11 December 1884 Kumamoto Prefecture, Japan
- Died: 6 August 1945 (aged 60) Hiroshima, Japan
- Education: Tokyo Imperial University

Isei Otsuka (大塚 惟精, Ōtsuka Isei, 11 December 1884 – 6 August 1945) was a Japanese politician who served as governor of Hiroshima Prefecture from April to June 1945. He was also governor of Tochigi Prefecture (1924–1926), Fukuoka Prefecture (1926–1927) and Ishikawa Prefecture (1927). He was killed in the atomic bombing of Hiroshima.

Preceded by Haruki Yamawaki	Governor of Tochigi Prefecture; 1924–1926	Succeeded by Hyoichi Fujioka
Preceded by Mitsuma Matsumura	Governor of Hiroshima Prefecture; 21 April – 10 June 1945	Succeeded by Genshin Takano
