= List of governors of Ishikawa Prefecture =

== Appointed governors ==
- Takatoshi Iwamura 1883-1890
- Shiba Sankarasu 1898-1900
- Kiichirō Kumagai 1914-1915
- Ōta Masahiro 1915-1916
- Jiro Yamagata 1922-1923
- Korekiyo Otsuka 1927
- Sukenari Yokoyama 1927
- Nakano Kunikazu 1929-1931
- Masasuke Kodama 1937-1938
- Shunsuke Kondo 1938-1939
- Narita Ichiro 1939-1940

== Elected governors ==
- Wakio Shibano 1947-1955
- Jujitsu Taya 1955-1963
- Yōichi Nakanishi 1963-1994
- Masanori Tanimoto 1994–2022
- Hiroshi Hase 2022-2026
- Yukiyoshi Yamano 2026-present
