= 1978 in Japan =

- Decades: 1950s; 1960s; 1970s; 1980s; 1990s
- See also: Other events of 1978; History of Japan • Timeline • Years

Events in the year 1978 in Japan. It corresponds to Shōwa 53 (昭和53年) in the Japanese calendar.

== Incumbents ==
- Emperor: Hirohito
- Prime minister: Takeo Fukuda (Liberal Democratic) until December 7, Masayoshi Ōhira (Liberal Democratic)
- Chief Cabinet Secretary: Shintaro Abe until December 7, Rokusuke Tanaka
- Chief Justice of the Supreme Court: Masao Okahara
- President of the House of Representatives: Shigeru Hori
- President of the House of Councillors: Ken Yasui
- Diet sessions: 84th (regular session opened in December 19, 1977, to June 16), 85th (extraordinary, September 18 to October 21), 86th (extraordinary, December 6 to December 12), 87th (regular, December 22 to June 14, 1979)

=== Governors ===
- Aichi Prefecture: Yoshiaki Nakaya
- Akita Prefecture: Yūjirō Obata
- Aomori Prefecture: Shunkichi Takeuchi
- Chiba Prefecture: Kiichi Kawakami
- Ehime Prefecture: Haruki Shiraishi
- Fukui Prefecture: Heidayū Nakagawa
- Fukuoka Prefecture: Hikaru Kamei
- Fukushima Prefecture: Isao Matsudaira
- Gifu Prefecture: Yosuke Uematsu
- Gunma Prefecture: Ichiro Shimizu
- Hiroshima Prefecture: Hiroshi Miyazawa
- Hokkaido: Naohiro Dōgakinai
- Hyogo Prefecture: Tokitada Sakai
- Ibaraki Prefecture: Fujio Takeuchi
- Ishikawa Prefecture: Yōichi Nakanishi
- Iwate Prefecture: Tadashi Chida
- Kagawa Prefecture: Tadao Maekawa
- Kagoshima Prefecture: Kaname Kamada
- Kanagawa Prefecture: Kazuji Nagasu
- Kochi Prefecture: Chikara Nakauchi
- Kumamoto Prefecture: Issei Sawada
- Kyoto Prefecture: Torazō Ninagawa (until 15 April); Yukio Hayashida (starting 15 April)
- Mie Prefecture: Ryōzō Tagawa
- Miyagi Prefecture: Sōichirō Yamamoto
- Miyazaki Prefecture: Hiroshi Kuroki
- Nagano Prefecture: Gon'ichirō Nishizawa
- Nagasaki Prefecture: Kan'ichi Kubo
- Nara Prefecture: Ryozo Okuda
- Niigata Prefecture: Takeo Kimi
- Oita Prefecture: Masaru Taki
- Okayama Prefecture: Shiro Nagano
- Okinawa Prefecture:
  - until 23 November: Koichi Taira
  - 23 November-13 December: Takemori Nijima
  - starting 13 December: Junji Nishime
- Osaka Prefecture: Ryōichi Kuroda
- Saga Prefecture: Sunao Ikeda
- Saitama Prefecture: Yawara Hata
- Shiga Prefecture: Masayoshi Takemura
- Shiname Prefecture: Seiji Tsunematsu
- Shizuoka Prefecture: Keizaburō Yamamoto
- Tochigi Prefecture: Yuzuru Funada
- Tokushima Prefecture: Yasunobu Takeichi
- Tokyo: Ryōkichi Minobe
- Tottori Prefecture: Kōzō Hirabayashi
- Toyama Prefecture: Kokichi Nakada
- Wakayama Prefecture: Shirō Kariya
- Yamagata Prefecture: Seiichirō Itagaki
- Yamaguchi Prefecture: Toru Hirai
- Yamanashi Prefecture: Kunio Tanabe

== Events ==
- January 14 – According to Japan Fire and Disaster Management Agency confirmed report, total of 25 people were dead, 211 people were wounded, a Richer Scale 6.7 earthquake and aftershocks damaged in Izu Peninsula, Shizuoka Prefecture.
- March 26 – Protesters destroy much of equipment in the control tower of Narita Airport with Molotov cocktails, set to open in just four days.
- April 6 – Sunshine 60 has officially open in Ikebukuro, Toshima, Tokyo, the tallest skyscraper in Asia (Japan), until 63 Building in Seoul, South Korea on July 27, 1985.
- May 20, 1978 – Narita International Airport opened
- June 2 – Japan Air Lines Flight 115 suffered a tailstrike while landing at Osaka International Airport.
- June 12 – A large 7.7 magnitude earthquake hits offshore Miyagi Prefecture and causes 28 deaths and 1,325 injuries.
- July 30, 1978 – Okinawa Prefecture changed driving on the Right-hand traffic to Left-hand traffic(730)
- August 12 – The Treaty of Peace and Friendship between Japan and the People's Republic of China is concluded.
- December 16 – The Mystery of Mamo is released in cinemas.

== Births ==
=== January–June ===
- January 2 – Toyoguchi Megumi, voice actress
- January 6 –
  - Reina Miyauchi, J-pop singer
  - Ayano Tsuji, J-pop singer
- January 7 – Asami Imajuku, model, actress, and singer
- January 9 – Hassei Takano, actor
- January 10 – Kanako Mitsuhashi, voice actress
- January 11 – Kyoko Hamaguchi, freestyle wrestler
- January 15 – Vanilla Yamazaki, katsudō-benshi, voice actor, an actress
- January 16 – Hisanori Ōiwa, actor, stunt performer and suit actor
- January 17
  - Takatoshi Kaneko, actor
  - Hiro Suzuhira, manga artist
- January 24 – Tomokazu Myojin, football midfielder
- January 26 – Atsuko Kurusu, actress
- January 27 – Akiko Hinagata, actress and former gravure idol.
- February 4 – Shingo Kawaguchi, actor
- February 20 – Ken Takeuchi, voice actor
- February 21 – Miki Sakai, actress and J-pop idol singer
- February 23 – Yuka Motohashi, actress
- February 25
  - Yuji Nakazawa, football player
  - Shintarō Tokita, musician
- February 28 – Rei Kikukawa, actress, model, and television presenter
- March 1
  - Noriyasu Agematsu, composer
  - Sakura Nogawa, voice actress
- March 8 – Genki Sudo, mixed martial artist and a kickboxer
- March 9 – Ryosuke Sawai, baseball player
- March 12 – Arina Tanemura, manga artist
- March 15 – Takeru Kobayashi, competitive eater
- March 18
  - Shimotori Norio, sumo wrestler
  - Yoshie Takeshita, volleyball player
- March 20 – Hanako Oku, singer
- March 24
  - Takeharu Kato, baseball player
  - Kaori Mochida, singer
- March 29 – Hirotoki Onozawa, rugby union player
- April 5 – Yumie Funayama, curler
- April 8 – Daigo, e singer-songwriter, actor, talent, and voice actor
- April 9
  - Kousei Amano, actor
  - Takashi Ōhara, voice actor
- April 14 – Kaori Muraji, classical guitarist
- April 18 – Ryōta Tsuzuki, football player
- April 24 – Kazunari Okayama, football player
- April 26
  - Hiroshi Asai, musician and composer
  - Shinnosuke Tachibana, voice actor
- April 27 – Takahiro Suzuki, baseball player
- May 1 – Sachie Hara, actress and model
- May 3 – Dai Tamesue, hurdler athlete
- May 4 – Daisuke Ono, voice actor
- May 8 – Atsushi Sato, long-distance runner
- May 10 – Daisuke Yamai, basketball pitcher
- May 11 – Ushiomaru Motoyasu, sumo wrestler (d. 2019)
- October 2 – Ayumi Hamasaki, singer, songwriter, actress and model
- May 12 – Masahiro Abe, baseball player
- May 13 – Junji Majima, voice actor
- May 15
  - Kōsei Inoue, Judoka
  - Hideki Sahara, football player
- May 17 – Norihiro Yamagishi, football player
- May 18 – Toru Yano, wrestler
- May 23 – Hideaki Kitajima, football player
- June 1 – Ayako Ikeda, singer-songwriter
- June 2 – Junko Yaginuma, announcer and model
- June 5
  - Yuka Inokuchi, voice actress
  - Takayuki Kondō, voice actor
  - Taro Suruga, musician
- June 12 – Yumiko Shaku, actress and model
- June 13 – Mikako Ichikawa, actress and model
- June 17 – Kumiko Asō, actress
- June 24 – Shunsuke Nakamura, football player
- June 25 – Miki Nakao, backstroke swimmer

=== July –December ===
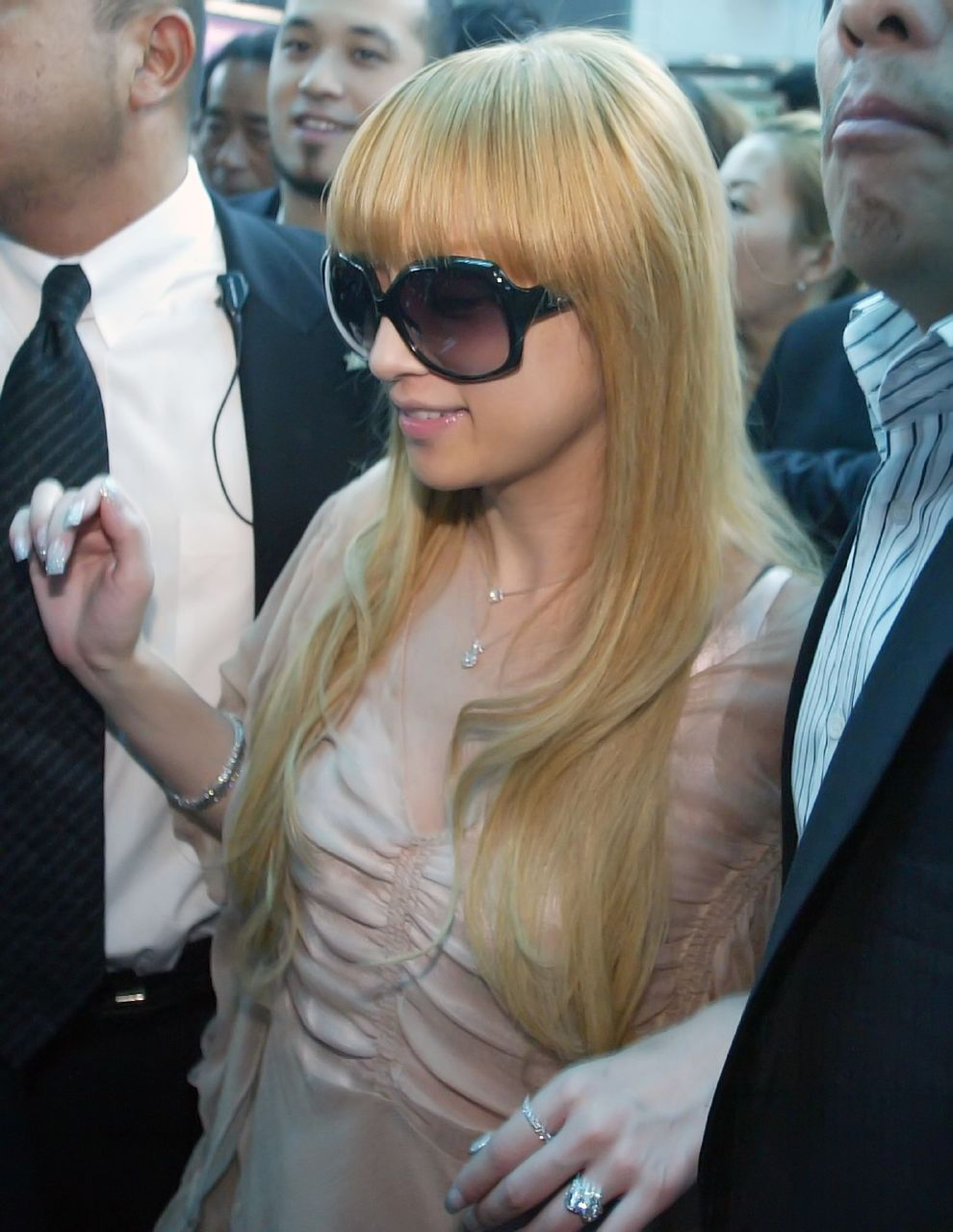
Ayumi Hamasaki

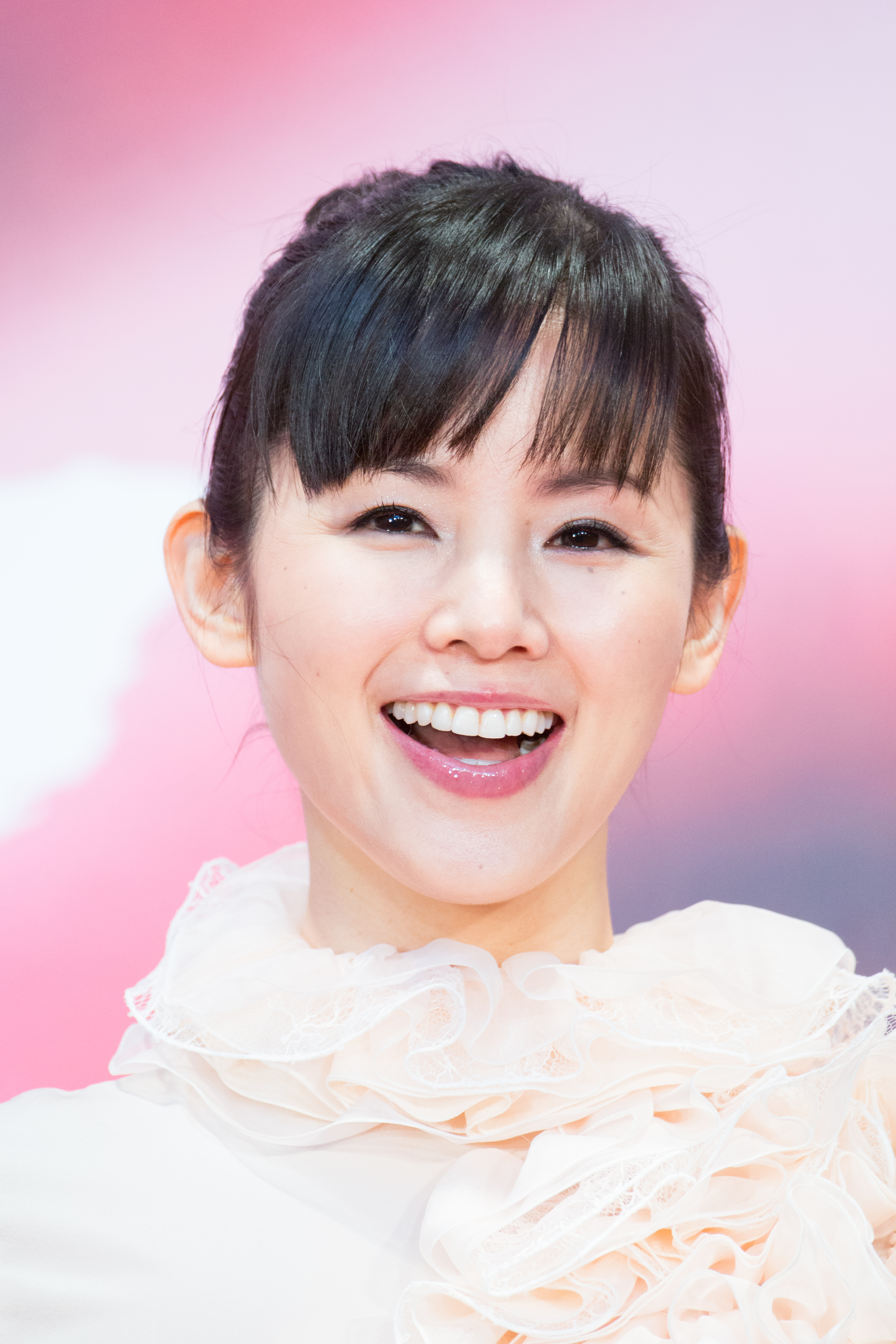
Manami Konishi

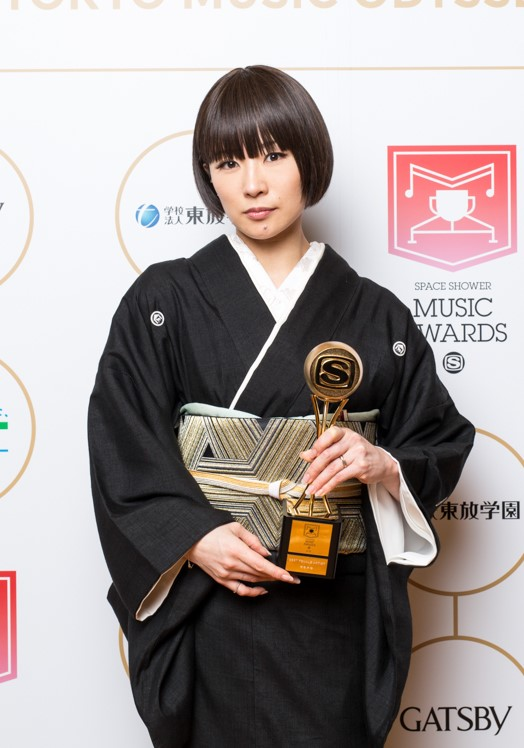
Ringo Sheena

- July 3 – Mizuki Noguchi, long-distance runner
- July 4 – Yusuke Murata manga artist
- July 7
  - Kayo Kitada, judoka
  - Misia, singer, songwriter, and record producer
- July 9 – Osamu Hamanaka, baseball player
- July 10 – Kotaro Koizumi, actor
- July 12 – Yoshihito Ishii, baseball player
- July 19 – Atsushi Harada, actor
- July 21 – Kyoko Iwasaki, swimmer
- July 22 – Kyōko Hasegawa, actress and model
- July 23 – Takashi Yamamoto, swimmer
- July 24 – Sayo Aizawa, model
- July 28 – Hitomi Yaida, pop/folk rock singer-songwriter and guitarist
- August 4 – Satoshi Hino, voice actor
- August 8
  - Natsuko Kuwatani, voice actress
  - Miho Shiraishi, actress
- August 12
  - Toru Kurihara, rugby union player
  - Kakizoe Tōru, sumo wrestler
- August 24 – Kentaro Sekimoto, baseball player
- September 6
  - Homare Sawa, football player
  - Keigo Yamashita, Go player
- September 18 – Kaoru Mori, manga artist
- October 2 – Ayumi Hamasaki, recording artist, actress, model, and entrepreneur
- October 18
  - Kotomi Kyono, actress
  - Minoru Shiraishi, voice actor
- October 20 – Nora Hirano, comedian
- October 21 – Mariko Ooe, newsroom announcer
- October 25 – Maria Takagi, actress
- October 25 – An Yong-hak, North Korean, football manager
- October 27 – Manami Konishi, rapper, songwriter, record producer, and actress
- October 31 – Mika Sugisaki, announcer, radio personality, entertainer, and actress
- November 3 – Koshiro Take, jockey
- November 4 – Akiko Abe, announcer and actress
- November 7 – Tomoya Nagase, singer and actor
- November 8 – Kensaku Kishida, actor
- November 10 – Akemi Kanda, voice actress
- November 25
  - Ayumi Ogasawara, curler
  - Ringo Sheena, singer, songwriter and musician
- November 26 – Fukuyama Jun voice actor
- November 28 – Tomohiro Nagatsuka cyclist
- December 3 – Yamato Kochi, actor
- December 5 – Michinao Yamamura, baseball player
- December 7 – Yasue Sato, actress and model
- December 9 – Chihiro Kusaka, voice actress
- December 12 – Hiroki Konno, comedian
- December 23 – Akiko Yada, actress
- December 25 – Miyuki Takahashi, volleyball player
- December 26 – Kaoru Sugayama, volleyball player
- December 29 – Noriko Aoyama, actress and former model

== Deaths ==
- January 3 – Prince Kaya Tsunenori (b. 1900)
- January 5 – Shōji Hamada, potter (b. 1894)
- February 7 – Keizō Komura, admiral (b. 1896)
- March 1 – Kiyoshi Oka, mathematician (b. 1901)
- March 5 – Toshiko Higashikuni, daughter of Emperor Meiji (b. 1896)
- April 29 – Yukihiko Yasuda, painter (b. 1884)
- May 15 – Kiku Amino, author and translator (b. 1900)
- May 30 – Tetsu Katayama, politician and 33rd Prime Minister of Japan (b. 1887)
- June 6 – Katué Kitasono, poet and photographer (b. 1902)
- July 10 – Takashi Suzuki, politician (b. 1882)
- July 25 – Masao Koga, composer (b. 1904)
- August 1 – Kōgorō Uemura, businessman (b. 1892)
- September 9 – Kaoru Abe, saxophonist (b. 1949)

== See also ==
- 1978 in Japanese television
- List of Japanese films of 1978
- 1978 in Japanese music
