= Takeharu =

- Gender: Male

Origin
- Origin: Japanese
- Meaning: Different meanings depending on the kanji used

Takeharu (written: 武春, 武治 or 丈晴) is a masculine Japanese given name. Notable people with the name include:

- Dejima Takeharu (出島 武春; born 1974), Japanese sumo wrestler
- Takeharu Ishimoto (石元 丈晴), Japanese video game composer
- Takeharu Kato (加藤 武治; born 1978), Japanese baseball player
- Takeharu Kunimoto (国本 武春; born 1960), Japanese musician
