= Kishida (surname) =

Kishida (written: 岸田 lit. "bank/shore, rice field") is a Japanese surname. Notable people with the name include:

- Fumio Kishida (born 1957), Prime Minister of Japan since 2021
- Hiroki Kishida (born 1981), Japanese footballer
- Kensaku Kishida (岸田 健作; born 1978), Japanese actor and entertainer
- Kunio Kishida (1890–1954), Japanese dramatist and writer
- Kyōko Kishida (1930–2006), Japanese actress
- Kyukichi Kishida (1888–1968), Japanese entomologist
- Mitsugi Kishida (1916–1988), Japanese photographer
- Ryūsei Kishida (born 1891), Japanese painter
- Shin Kishida (1939–1982), Japanese actor
- Toshiko Kishida (1863–1901), Japanese feminist pioneer and activist

== Fictional characters ==
- Fumio Kishida (岸田 文夫), a character in The Return of Ultraman
- Takeshi Kishida (岸田 猛), a character in Captain Tsubasa
