= Kensaku =

- Gender: Male

Origin
- Origin: Japanese
- Meaning: Different meanings depending on the kanji used

Kensaku (written: 健作, 謙作 or 憲作) is a masculine Japanese given name. Notable people with the name include:

- Kensaku Abe (阿部 謙作; born 1980), Japanese footballer
- Kensaku Kishida (岸田 健作; born 1978), Japanese actor and entertainer
- Kensaku Morita (森田 健作; born 1949), Japanese actor, singer and politician
- Kensaku Oda (小田 健作; 1888–1943), Japanese general
- Kensaku Omori (大森 健作; born 1975), Japanese footballer
- Kensaku Segoe (瀬越 憲作; 1889–1972), Japanese Go player
- Kensaku Shimaki (島木 健作; 1903–1945), pen name of Asakura Kikuo, Japanese writer
- Kensaku Tennichi (天日 謙作; born 1966), Japanese basketball coach
