= Hamanaka (surname) =

Hamanaka (Japanese: 浜中, lit. 'middle of the beach'; also spelled 濱中) is a Japanese surname. Notable individuals with the surname include:

- Akira Hamanaka (浜中 明; born 1976), Japanese manga writer
- Ayae Hamanaka (濱中 彩恵; born 1982), Japanese cheerleader
- Bunichi Hamanaka (浜中 文一; born 1987), Japanese actor
- Eiji Hamanaka (濱中 英次; born 1966), Japanese baseball player
- Hiroaki Hamanaka (濵中 裕明; born 1971), Japanese mathematician
- Hirohisa Hamanaka (濱中 博久; born 1952), Japanese narrator
- Hiromi Hamanaka (濱中 洋美; born 1982), Japanese soft tennis player
- Hironori Hamanaka (浜中 裕徳; born 1944), Japanese environmental bureaucrat
- Junko Hamanaka (announcer) (浜中 順子; born 1969), Japanese television announcer
- Junko Hamanaka (sociologist) (濱中 淳子; born 1974), Japanese educational sociologist
- Kazuhiro Hamanaka (浜中 和宏; born 1978), Japanese mixed martial artist
- Keiichi Hamanaka (浜中 啓一; born 1957), Japanese television announcer
- Ken Hamanaka (浜中 謙; born 1989), Japanese basketball coach
- Koichi Hamanaka (clarinetist) (浜中 浩一; 1937–2013), Japanese clarinet player
- Koichi Hamanaka (engineer) (浜中 宏一; born 1941), Japanese engineer
- Miki Hamanaka (浜中 未紀; born 1978), Japanese ballerina
- Osamu Hamanaka (濱中 治; born 1978), former Japanese professional baseball player
- Sheila Hamanaka, American writer and illustrator
- Shoichiro Hamanaka (濱中 昭一郎; born 1930), Japanese businessman
- Suguru Hamanaka (浜中 俊; born 1988), Japanese jockey racer
- Yasuo Hamanaka (浜中 泰男; born 1950), Japanese copper trader
- Yoshikazu Hamanaka (浜中 祥和; born 1938), Japanese baseball player
