= Takashi Suzuki =

Takashi Suzuki may refer to:

- Takashi Suzuki (government official) (鈴木 隆史, born 1941), Japanese government official
- Takashi Suzuki (politician) (鈴木 隆, 1882–1978), Japanese stock trader and politician

== See also ==
- Takeshi Suzuki (disambiguation)
