= Gekisou Sentai Carranger =

Japanese TV series

- Title card
- Genre: Tokusatsu; Self-parody; Superhero fiction Action-Comedy; Slice of life
- Created by: Toei Company
- Developed by: Yoshio Urasawa
- Directed by: Yoshiaki Kobayashi
- Starring: Yūji Kishi; Yoshihiro Masujima; Yoshihiro Fukuda; Yuka Motohashi; Atsuko Kurusu; Rika Nanase
- Opening theme: "Gekisou Sentai Carranger" by Naritaka Takayama
- Ending theme: "Paradise Samba" by Naritaka Takayama
- Composer: Toshihiko Sahashi
- Country of origin: Japan
- Original language: Japanese
- No. of episodes: 48

Production
- Producers: Tarō Iwamoto; Atsushi Kaji; Kenji Ōta; Shigenori Takatera; Kōichi Yada
- Production location: Tokyo, Japan (Greater Tokyo Area)
- Running time: approx. 20 minutes'
- Production companies: TV Asahi; Toei Company; Toei Agency

Original release
- Network: ANN (TV Asahi)
- Release: March 1, 1996 – February 7, 1997

Related
- Chouriki Sentai Ohranger; Denji Sentai Megaranger

Gekisou Sentai Carranger (激走戦隊カーレンジャー, Gekisō Sentai Kārenjā; Racing Squadron Carranger) is a Japanese tokusatsu television show. It was Toei's 20th production of the Super Sentai metaseries. It is the second vehicle-themed Super Sentai, preceded by Kousoku Sentai Turboranger. It aired from March 1, 1996, to February 7, 1997, replacing Chouriki Sentai Ohranger, and was replaced by Denji Sentai Megaranger. The show was written as a parody of its own franchise. Its action footage was used in Power Rangers Turbo. Toei's given name for international distribution is Car Rangers.

On January 6, 2017, Amazon set to pre-order "Gekisou Sentai Carranger: The Complete Series" on Region 1 DVD by Shout! Factory and it was released in North America on April 25, 2017. This is the fifth Super Sentai series to be released in North America. In June 2018, Shout! streamed the series on their website.

== Plot ==
Five workers from the Pegasus Corporation auto garage discover Dappu, an alien from the planet Hazard. He empowers the five with the "Carmagic" power of the five legendary car constellations, transforming them into Carrangers. As Carrangers, the five battle an alien reckless driver gang and prevent them from destroying Earth.

== Characters ==
=== Carrangers ===
The eponymous Carrangers are a group of five employees at the Pegasus Corporation (株式会社ペガサス, Kabushikigaisha Pegasasu) auto garage who battle the Bowzock using Carmagic Power (クルマジックパワー, Kurumajikku Pawā). (Note: Advertisements for the series show that the first kana in the Carrangers' names spell "automobile" (自動車 (じ・ど・う・し・ゃ), Jidōsha (Ji-Do-U-Shi-Ya)) in Japanese.) Their special team attack is the Carmagic Attack (クルマジックアタック, Kurumajikku Atakku).

The team utilizes Accel Keys (アクセルキー, Akuseru Kī) in conjunction with ignition switch-like Accel Changer (アクセルチェンジャー, Akuseru Chenjā) bracelets to transform. While transformed, each member carries an Auto Blaster (オートブラスター, Ōto Burasutā), which can be reconfigured into the Auto Punisher (オートパニッシャー, Ōto Panisshā) railgun, and a ViBlade (バイブレード, Baiburēdo) sword as their sidearms. They also ride Speeder Machine (スピーダーマシン, Supīdā Mashin) go-karts for transportation. By combining their personal weapons, they form the Giga Formula (ギガフォーミュラー, Giga Fōmyurā), which can be reconfigured into the Formula Nova (フォーミュラーノバ, Fōmyurā Noba) to destroy human-sized Gorotsuki. Later in the series, they acquire the Car Navic (カーナビック, Kā Nabikku) scanner, which can switch between its laptop-like Navic Com (ナビックコム, Nabikku Komu) and handgun-like Navic Shot (ナビックショット, Nabikku Shotto) modes and/or combine with an Auto Punisher to form the Navic Blaster (ナビックブラスター, Nabikku Burastā), and the dragster-like Giga Booster (ギガブースター, Giga Būsutā), which can be reconfigured into either the Booster Cannon (ブースターキャノン, Būsutā Kyanon) or the Booster Jet (ブースタージェット, Būsutā Jetto).

==== Kyosuke Jinnai ====
Kyosuke Jinnai/Red Racer (陣内 恭介/レッドレーサー, Jinnai Kyōsuke/Reddo Rēsā) is the 23 year old test driver at Pegasus Corporation, normally only assigned to do errands and aberrant jobs. He was previously a selfish jerk, callous enough to abandon his team because he wanted to drive his boss's classic car. Soon though, he realized that he had a responsibility as the Carrangers' leader and became very conscientious, albeit the role of leader sometimes gets to him and he is inundated by the stress of being responsible for the team. He fell in love with Zonnette, albeit at first she only loves his Red Racer alter ego, and is eventually able to confess his love to her. He is a very stouthearted, heroic man who was disposed to jeopardize his life to fight as Kyousuke and not Red Racer to prove his love for Zonnette.

As Red Racer, Kyosuke wields the Fender Sword (フェンダーソード, Fendā Sōdo). Later in the series, he tames and acquires the sentient Pegasus Thunder (ペガサスサンダー, Pegasasu Sandā) Chevrolet Camaro, which is equipped with the Pegasus Laser (ペガサスレーザー, Pegasasu Rēzā) gun and can assume Sky Mode (スカイモード, Sukai Mōdo) to gain flight capabilities. He also shares riding Pegasus Thunder with Yoko.

==== Naoki Domon ====
Naoki Domon/Blue Racer (土門 直樹/ブルーレーサー, Domon Naoki/Burū Rēsā) is the 17 year old (though he turns 18 during the series – he had his birthday party early on in the series, but his partners unknowingly missed the date by a month) polite and shy car designer at Pegasus Corporation. His aptitude had led him to be sought by car manufacturers before. He is also an animal lover.

As Blue Racer, Naoki dual wields the twin Muffler Guns (マフラーガン, Mafurā Gan). Later in the series, he tames and acquires the sentient Dragon Cruiser (ドラゴンクルーザー, Doragon Kurūzā) Jeep Wrangler, which is equipped with the Dragon Claw (ドラゴンクロー, Doragon Kurō) winch and can combine with the Giga Booster to gain increased power. He also shares riding Dragon Cruiser with Minoru and Natsumi.

==== Minoru Uesugi ====
Minoru Uesugi/Green Racer (上杉 実/グリーンレーサー, Uesugi Minoru/Gurīn Rēsā) is the 24 year old bungling salesman at Pegasus Corporation. He once lost his Accel Changer (and thus the Green Racer powers) while practicing victory poses after a fight in episode 8. He verbalizes with Osaka-ben and is a fan of the Hanshin Tigers.

As Green Racer, Minoru wields the Engine Cannon (エンジンキャノン, Enjin Kyanon).

==== Natsumi Shinohara ====
Natsumi Shinohara/Yellow Racer (志乃原 菜摘/イエローレーサー, Shinohara Natsumi/Ierō Rēsā) is the 19 year old genius mechanic at Pegasus. She is able to fine-tune any machine in minutes. She uses a legendary wrench given to her by the owner of a garage she visited as a child, but later learns she can still fine-tune anything without the wrench. Her initial opposition to Kyosuke's relationship with Zonnette makes her one of two female warriors to oppose the red warrior.

As Yellow Racer, Natsumi dual wields the twin Side Knuckles (サイドナックル, Saido Nakkuru).

==== Yoko Yagami ====
Yoko Yagami/Pink Racer (八神 洋子/ピンクレーサー, Yagami Yōko/Pinku Rēsā) is the 19 year old secretary at Pegasus Corporation, calculating the expenses and payroll. She is very self-conscious about her weight because she loves to eat sweets, and frequently consults magazine fortune-telling articles to prognosticate her future. She dreams of becoming an idol someday and espousing an affluent husband, and has a terrible sense of direction.

As Pink Racer, Youko wields the Bumper Bow (バンパーボゥ, Banpā Bō).

=== Allies ===
==== Dapp ====
Dapp (ダップ, Dappu) is one of the few survivors of planet Hazard, which was destroyed by the Bowzock after they ransacked it for its treasures, he took his mother's pendant as her final wish to find the Carrangers. Stalling away on the Barbariban, Dappu arrives to Earth to find the Carrangers-to-be. But when they refused to fight for frivolous reasons, Dappu fights Zelmonda himself and fakes being killed to give the gang incentive to fight. He is the keeper of the 'Kurumagic' (a pun on Kuruma (car) and Magic), thus the Carrangers' power is dependent on their friendship with him. Through about episode 18, he wore a cloak, until the events of that episode forced him into Earth-style clothes.

==== Signalman ====
Signalman (シグナルマン, Shigunaruman) is a blue-colored robotic being who was assigned to Earth, and something of a Sixth Ranger figure. He originates from the Police Planet where he left behind his wife Sigue and son Sigtarou. To Gynamo, Signalman is space's number one worst person. He can sometimes be more of an obstruction than a help to the Carrangers, because of his excruciating training in the rules of traffic. Signalman briefly left Earth and returned to his homeworld to spend time with his family only to find that it was polluted by five-colored exhaust engendered by Exhaus to warp Signalman's mind. Tricked into thinking that the Carrangers were behind it, he went back to Earth to perform police brutality on them, and remotely became the new leader of the Bowzock. Fortunately, the Carrangers managed to restore their friend to normal by tricking him into imbibing natural mineral dihydrogen monoxide. Signalman kenned off the Carrangers true identities until episode 46 through Ichitarou.

Signalman can conventionally be optically discerned operating from the Kobaan Base (コバーンベース, Kōban Bēsu; Police Box Base), a diminutively minuscule Police booth, which can be proximately everywhere in Japan (except places where people might actually pass it...). In battle, he wields the Signaizer (シグナイザー, Shigunaizā) sidearm, which can switch between Police Baton Mode (ポリスバトンモード, Porisu Baton Mōdo) and Gun Mode (ポリスバトンモード, Gan Mōdo). He also rides the Policepeeder (ポリスピーダー, Porisupīdā) police motorcycle.

==== Tenma Family ====
The Tenma Family (天馬家, Tenma-ke) (Note: Tenma is the Japanese word for "pegasus".) is the family involved in the Carrangers' lives.

===== Souichirou Tenma =====
Souichirou Tenma (天馬 総一郎, Tenma Sōichirō) is the owner of Pegasus Corporation and the Carrangers' boss. He is an automobile aficionado and always drives his prized vehicles to work, much to the envy of other car lovers such as Kyousuke Jinnai. He and his family are fans of the Carrangers (even though he does not know they are his workers) and finds himself at the mercy upon occasion both at the actions of the Bowzock as well as Dapp, who is using one of the garage's rooms as the team's headquarters in secret.

===== Yoshie Tenma =====
Yoshie Tenma (天馬 良江, Tenma Yoshie) is Souichirou's wife.

===== Ichitarou Tenma =====
Ichitarou Tenma (天馬 市太郎, Tenma Ichitarō) is Souichirou and Yoshie's son, who is close friends with Signalman. Though a young boy, he is a friend and ally with the Carrangers and has frequent encounters with the Sentai team as well as other factions running amok on Earth. Notably, he is the one who originally suggested to Inventor Grotch various food that was popular on Earth, in particular the imo-youkan that would lead to the Bowzock discovering a method of growing large to destroy Earth (though originally suggested by his father). He also once protected Signalman's police box while the alien officer was on duty.

==== Radietta Fanbelt ====
Radietta Fanbelt/White Racer (ラジエッタ・ファンベルト/ホワイトレーサー, Rajietta Fanberuto/Howaito Rēsā) (Note: Radietta's full name is derived from the words "radiator" and "fanbelt".) is the younger sister of Zonnette and a huge Carranger fan. With magic, she dons an outfit modeled after the Carrangers (to the point of having the number six as an identifier) and calls herself "White Racer".

As White Racer, Radietta uses volleyball-like Riddle Bombs (謎々爆弾, Nazonazo Bakudan) that detonate if the enemy who catches it does not know the answer to her riddles. She also rides the cat-themed Radiacar (ラジエッカー, Rajiekkā) buggy, which can assume a humanoid form called Radiacar Robo (ラジエッカーロボ, Rajiekkā Robo) for one minute.

==== VRV Master ====
VRV Master (VRVマスター, Bui Aru Bui Masutā), also known as the "Space Lone Wolf" (宇宙の一匹狼, Uchū no Ippiki Ōkami), is a being in black-colored armor who suddenly appears while Dapp is in a hibernation that his race goes into. He gives the Carrangers their VRV Machines after RV Robo has been stolen by Bowzock. He is later revealed to be Dapp's father. To save his son from Exhaus, VRV Master apparently sacrifices himself so he could return to Earth. Later through a Christmas gift from VRV Master himself, it was revealed that he is alive. He returns to Earth once again to save the Carrangers and Dapp from being killed in a bombing of their work/base. He is addicted to coffee milk, which is the reason he was not in hibernation himself. After the final battle, VRV Master is finally seen out of his suit as he travels through space with Dapp in Victrailer.

=== Universal Reckless Driving Tribe Bowzock ===
The Universal Reckless Driving Tribe Bowzock (宇宙暴走族ボーゾック, Uchū Bōsōzoku Bōzokku) is an intergalactic biker gang with no regard for the laws of traffic. Hired by Exhaus to pave the way for his highway by blowing up every planet in the way of construction. They have targeted Earth, the last of such planets, for destruction and frequently hang out at the BB Saloon, a bar in the Baribarian spacecraft. After he had absorbed the Carrangers' Carmagic Power, Exhaus set the Baribarian spacecraft on fire and sent it crashing to Earth, only to have it stopped by Sirender and the Carrangers in human form take control of it and drove it straight into Exhaus to try and kill him. It did not kill him, though it was destroyed.

The Bowzock members, as well as Signalman, mispronounce the Japanese word for "Earth", saying チーキュ (Chīkyu) (吃球) instead of the correct form ㋠キュー (Chikyū) (地球). In Shout! Factory's release of the series, the name of "Earth" is changed to "Earsh".

- Reckless Driving Emperor Exhaus (暴走皇帝エグゾス, Bōsō Kōtei Eguzosu) (Note: Exhaus' name is derived from the word "exhaust".) is the main antagonist of the series who hired the Universal Reckless Driving Tribe Bowzock to do his dirty work. His ultimate plan was to build a giant road for aliens across the Milky Way, and to destroy Earth because it was in the way of the road. Exhaus kidnapped Dapp and tried to drain his Carmagic Power to use for his own robots, turning it into Akumagic Power, but his plan backfired when Dappu overloaded the robots with power. He betrayed the Bowzock and took over the operation personally, only to fight the Carrangers personally when he absorbed the evil energies of the entire universe into his body to assume a fighting form, Exhaus Super-Strong (エグゾス・スーパーストロング, Eguzosu Sūpā Sutorongu). In this form he seemed unbeatable, damaging both VRV Robo and RV Robo, but was fed stale imo-youkan by Gynamo, causing him to weaken, revert to his original form and shrink to human size so he could be finished off by the Carrangers.
- President Gynamo (総長ガイナモ, Sōchō Gainamo) (Note: Gynamo's name is derived from the word "dynamo".) is the biker/octopus leader of the Bowzock who is madly in love with Zonnette, targeting Earth on her whim. Though he makes an idiot of himself in front of his posse during his attempts to woo Zonnette, Gynamo maintained his intimidation of the other Bowzock to maintain his power. Arriving to Earth, Gynamo uses his power to have Earth's vehicles go on a riot until the Carrangers arrive. The next time Gynamo arrived on Earth was when RitchRitchiker used his secret savings for marrying Zonnette to buy off Zelmoda and Grotch, getting work at an arcade's Yakiniku stand. But upon learning of RitchRitchiker's death, Gynamo resumes his position as Bowzock leader. At the end of the series, he re-opened the yakiniku restaurant that he set up while Ritchiker took over the Bowzock.
- Deputy Leader Zelmoda (副長ゼルモダ, Fukuchō Zerumoda) (Note: Zelmoda's name is derived from the Japanese word for "starter motor" (セルモーター, Seru Mōtā).) is the clown-like second-in-command of the Bowzock, and Gynamo's friend. Unlike comical other members, he is kind of cold-blooded as he only betrayed Gynamo after being offered a large sum of money by RitchRitchiker. His main weapon is a sword made up of playing cards and he carries an octopus jar, that usually holds Wanpers or cash. Zelmoda suffered astraphobia when he was screwing around during a thunderstorm as a kid and was hit by lightning. However, he mustered up enough will to overcome his fear so he can move out of Gynamo's shadow. Zelmoda summons Elekinta, who temporarily powered-up his ride. At the end of the series, he and Grotch help work at Gynamo's restaurant while going to elementary school for education.
- Inventor Grotch (発明家グラッチ, Hatsumeika Guratchi) (Note: Grotch's name is derived from the word "clutch".) is Bowzock's diving suit-clad genius inventor who is responsible for many of the weapons used by the Bowzock such as the Fattening Spray and Forgetfulness Water-Gun. Forced to flee to Earth for laughing at Gynamo's expense, a starved Grotch holds Ichirou hostage to force Yoshie to buy him lots of food. Among them was Imocho-brand imo-yōkan, causing him to enlarge as he unintentionally causes city-wide damage. He attempted to take advantage of his new size to kill the Carrangers, as their current arsenal has no effect. Fortunately, the imo-yōkan he ate had expired and wore off before either could do harm to the other. He is also saved by Zelmoda before the Carrangers could do him harm. After the incident with MM Mogu, Grotch would usually accompany a Gorotsuki to Earth and purchase Imocho-brand imo-yōkan. At the end of the series, he and Zelmoda helped work at Gynamo's restaurant while going to elementary school for education.
- Instructor Ritchhiker (リッチハイカー教授, Ritchihaikā-kyōju) (Note: Ritchhiker's name is derived from the word "hitchhiker".) is a car-themed alien who Gynamo hired to help the Bowzock as their "Evil Director of Human Resources", devising the plans to deal with the Carrangers and Signalman, whom he had a grudge on from putting him in jail. However, during the Bowzock Matsuri festival, Ritchhicker is struck by a lightning bolt made of pure evil cosmic energy that turns him into RitchRitchhiker (リッチリッチハイカー, Ritchiritchihaikā). With his increased intellect, RitchRitchiker kicked out Gynamo and Zonette and takes over as leader of the Bowzock with the promises of riches to the space bikers. From there, RitchRitchiker uses Braking to steal RV Robo from the Carrangers before using his robot to take a building holding the Study Book Fair to educate his forces. But it leads to his robot's defeat by the VRV Machines with RitchRitchhiker upgrading Braking as he proceeds to capture VRV Master. However, it results in RitchRitchiker's death when is consumed in the blaze caused by Braking being finally destroyed by VRV Robo.
- Beauty Zonnette (美女ゾンネット, Bijo Zonnetto) (Note: Zonnette's name is derived from the word "bonnet" while her true name is derived from "vanity mirror".) is an obedient member of Bowzock who uses her feminine wiles, and Gynamo's crush on her, for her own selfish pleasures. Zonnette drives a pink convertible called the Zonnecar. Arriving with a bandaged up Wurin in the guise of "Zonko" (in episode 13), she tricks Signalman into thinking the Carrangers are lawbreakers. However, as her plan failed, Zonnette fell madly in love with Red Racer after seeing him in action. However, she loved only Red Racer and not Kyosuke, who unintentionally broke her heart during the GG Goki-chan incident. As time passed she also fell for the man behind the mask. She is Radietta's big sister and the princess of planet Fanbelt. At the end of the series, Zonnette is shot by EE Musubinofu's arrow to marry Gynamo and becomes "purified" and resumed her true form of Vanity Mirror Fanbelt (バニティーミラー・ファンベルト, Banitī Mirā Fanberuto) by saying "Ravioli, Kishimen, Linguini!", returning to her home planet for an arranged marriage, though she turns them all down since Red Racer is still in her heart. She returned during the finale and talked Gynamo into teaming up with the Carrangers, which they did.
- Combatant Wanpers (戦闘員ワンパー, Sentōin Wanpā) (Note: Wanpers' name is derived from the words wiper and bumper.) are the Bowzock's multi-colored octopus-themed henchmen, able to shoot ink from their octopus-like mouths. They are contained in Zelmoda's giant octopus jar, similar to that of aquatic pets. They come in many colors; green, blue, white, and pink.

==== Gorotsuki ====
The Gorotsuki (ゴロツキ; Rogue/Thug) are the citizens of the Baribarian, the planet-like satellite where the Bowzock reside. They are chosen to find and fight the Carrangers, as the "monster of the week" for the series. When defeated, most of them eat imo-youkan, a yellow cube-shaped food made from jellied sweet potatoes to grow. It has to be from the store Imocho for this to happen. Otherwise, they shrink. As Grotch found out, out-of-date Imo-youkan from Imocho only enlarges the consumer for a short while until he reverts to original size. Gorotsuki had a habit of saying their names a lot, usually having them at the end of sentences.

- Reckless-Driving Fire Engine (暴走消防車, Bōsō Shōbōsha): A fire truck turned into a monster by Gynamo. It was destroyed by the Carrangers when they used their weapons on it.
- BB Donpa (ビービードンパ, BīBī Donpa): Known as the "Beethoven of Outer Space", he is a loudspeaker-armored zombie-themed monster who is Bowzock's music conductor, able to blast sound waves from the horns on his wrists in his Donpa Beam, Donpa is sent by Gynamo to cause a racket loud enough for UFOs to blow the planet up for the Bowzock. Once on Earth, Donpa carries out the plan by making cars fly around in a musical number with their car horns on full blast. But when the Carrangers arrive to stop him, Donpa uses the cars to smash them until Dappu brings the Giga Formula to them. Using the Formula Weapons, the Carrangers drive off the Wumpers and Zelmonda before forming the Formula Nova to blast Donpa as he escapes on his bike. Though he survived, Donpa could not stop his horns from making a racket as a UFO arrives near the Baribarian and vaporizes him with only his arm remaining. He reappeared, slightly modified, in a dream Kyosuke had in episode 9.
- RR Rii (リーリーリー, RīRī Rī): Bowzock's best spiritualist, Rii is an engineer-themed monster who uses a massive hammer that he uses to "beat" guts into people, making them crazy and cause chaos. He goes to Earth, after being promised Zelmonda's job if he succeeds. But while going after Yoshie, Rii ends up striking a vacuum cleaner and decides to bring inanimate objects to life to attack people instead. When four of the Carrangers intervene, Rii gains forced aid from Zelmonda. After Rii changes Tenma's car, Red Racer finally joins the fight. After driving Zelmonda off, the Carrangers use the Formula Nova to kill RR Rii before he could use his hammer on a building, restoring everything in the process.
- MM Mogu (モーモーモグー, MōMō Mogō): A big-mouthed red-eyed tree frog-themed monster who is Bowzock's best eater, wielding a giant fork and knife. Grotch brought him along to find out which Earth food made Bowzock enlarge, using Ichitaro as a hostage for Souichirou to bring them the food Grotch ate earlier, including Imo-Youkan. However, he brought non-Imocho-brand Imo-youkan and Mogu shrank as he and Grotch ran away from the Tenma men. Mogu stayed this way for a week until he and Grotch made their way to Imocho, buying enough Imo-youkan to turn the tiny Mogu into a giant. Mogu was reluctant to attack, due to belly button lint, until Grotch talked the Gorotsuki into ignoring such a minor concern and go on an enlarged feeding frenzy. Mogu was the first to be killed by the RV Robo, as he was too busy eating to see the final attack coming. "Moguu-moguu" is the sound of chewing.
- QQ Kyuutan (キューキューキュータン, KyūKyū Kyūtan): Bowzock's best searcher, he is a Pharaoh/appraiser-themed monster who uses a staff with a magnifying glass as his weapon. He is hired by Gynamo to find a necklace that Zonnette wanted in the hopes of winning her affections. Using his camera eye to take a picture of the drawing Zonnette made and his super speed, Kyuutan proceeds to break into jewelry stores to find the necklace. Taking advantage of the heated debate between Pink Racer and Yellow Racer, Kyuutan runs off until he dodges the Formula Nova. He then eats the Imo-youkan Grotch handed him and grows big to continue his search before easily defeating RV Robo until the girls finally set aside their differences as Kyuutan notices the Rainbow Bridge and believes it to be the necklace he's looking for. In the end, he is killed by RV Robo.
- NN Nerenko (ネーネーネレンコ, NēNē Nerenko): Bowzock's best graffiti artist, he is a clown-themed monster who was hired to use Grotch's fattening spray to make objects explode, after becoming too fat. Though told to stay put while Grotch gets him Imo-youkan, Nerenko goes on a spraying rampage after seeing graffiti that brings his style to shame. He nearly kills four of the Carrangers with the fattening spray, until Blue Racer washes it off his teammates. In battle, he can also blast lasers from the face on his helmet, which is called using his Nerenko Beam attack. Destroyed by RV Robo.
- YY Bingo (ヤーヤービンゴ, YāYā Bingo): Bowzock's best racer, he is a demon-themed monster chases people down on his car, as Green Racer intercepts him in a high-speed race to the death. In battle, he could blast energy from the horn on his head. Quickly killed when Green Racer tricked him into crashing his car.
- YY Gonza (ヤーヤーゴンザ, YāYā Gonza): Bowzock's second, then becomes first, best racer and YY Bingo's demon-themed younger brother, possessing the same abilities as Bingo and much more. Arriving on Earth, Gonza visits Bingo's gravemarker before vowing to avenge him. Acquiring Green Racer's Axle Changer as a tail ring, Gonza goes to commit vehicular man slaughter to flush out Green Racer without knowledge that his quarry is unable to show up. With the other Carrangers unable to battle the racing fiend, Minoru arrives to fight Gonza as himself in a one-sided one-on-one fight. After Minoru is KOed, the Carrangers battle Gonza until Zelmonda and Grotch arrive to give him Imo-youkan. Once enlarged, Gonza overpowers the four Carrangers as Minoru regans his Axle Changer after it dropped off of him. After provoking Gonza to go after him, Green Racer knocks the giant down before RV Robo is formed and kills Gonza.
- LL Onene (レーレーオネネ, RēRē Onene): Bowzock's best biker gang leader, she rode on the tripped out bike, called Ryuuseigou, and uses a baton as her weapon, able to blast lasers from her shaded eyes. Going on her own seeing how soft and unmotivated the Bowzock were becoming, she uses her Bowzock headbands to draft Naoki and others into her bicycle gang. Pursuing Onene on their cart, the Carrangers are at a disadvantage as she uses narrow passages they can reach. Recruiting more members to her group, from preschool to high school, Natsumi takes matters in her hands by dismantling Naoki's bike before the learn the method to Onene's control. Taking advantage of the headband, Natsumi has Naoki work out his leg muscles so Naoki can catch up to Onene as they race each other. Once forced off her bike, the Carrangers battle the Wumpers as Blue Racer battles Onene and takes her out with his kicks. Eating Imo-youkan, Onene battles RV Robo and is easily killed off.
- PP Rappa (パーパーラッパー, PāPā Rappā): Bowzock's best scholar/calculator-themed monster mathemagician, he appears to play havoc with his staff to manipulate numbers like those in transfer check amounts and the price of items in stores. The Carrangers catch up to Rappa as he accidentally called Pink Racer heavy and escapes after she decked him in the nose. After being laughed at by his peers, Rappa vows vengeance as Grotch provides him a powerup backpack and the ability to use Number Bombs. Though he overpowers the four Carrangers on his own, an irate Yoko arrives, believing Rappa screwed up her scale with his magic and made her think she was fat, and revealing herself as Pink Racer as she gives him a beating of a lifetime. Eating Imo-youkan, Rappa battles RV Robo and is quickly killed off.
- UU Wurin (ウーウーウーリン, ŪŪ Ūrin): Bowzock's best traffic light destroyer, a feral snapping turtle-themed alien beast who could blast lasers from his eyes. He was conditioned by Grotch, under Gynamo's instructions, to eat Signalman. When Gynamo lures Signalman into a trap, they put him in chains so Wurin could finish him off. However, Signalman manages to beat him. Fed Imo-youkan by Grotch, Wurin grabs Signalman and is about to eat him, when the Carrangers arrive in RV Robo to save Signalman. This happened before they used the Gekisou Slice on him. Somehow, Wurin survived the attack and upgraded himself with a helmet, which caused spikes to extend from his body. Now Revived UU Wurin (再生ウーウーウーリン, Saisei ŪŪ Uurin), he joins Zonnette in an attempt to drive a wedge between Signalman and the Carrangers. But seeing Pink Racer, Wurin becomes exposed, as a result of falling head over heels for her, chasing after her for a kiss. The others eventually arrived and used the Formula Nova to destroy him. Given twice the amount of Imo-youkan, Wurin keeps the Carrangers from summoning the Ranger Vehicles until Signalman arrives in the Sirender, laying the death penalty on the Gorotsuki.
- JJ Jetton (JJジェットトン, JēJē Jetton): A hippopotamus/punk-themed monster who is the best wrestler of Bowzock. Destroyed by RV Robo.
- ZZ Zeri (ゼーゼーゼリ, ZēZē Zeri): Bowzock's fashion designer, a very effeminante tropical fish-themed Gorotsuki who Ritchihiker uses in a scheme to have Signalman and the Carrangers destroy each other. Posing as a victim of Wumper abuse, Zeri manages to trick Signalman into putting on his rage-inducing "Anger Jacket" to have him under Ritchihiker's control with another made for Sirender when Signalman summons it. After Blue Racer and Green Racer destroy the remote while Red Racer removes the coat, Zeri enlarges to attack RV Robo by blasting patchwork shaped lasers from his eyes and electrified fabric samples s Sirender intervened as Zeri is then killed off by the combined teamwork of Sirender & RV Robo.
- OO Oopa (オーオーオーパ, ŌŌ Ōpa): Bowzock's yukata-wearing octopus-themed hot springs researcher, able to breathe fire and use bathhouse items as weapons. Oopa is sent by Ritchihiker to Rindo Lake Family Farm to take out the Carrangers with the Nuninini Beam Gun, which uses the energy from a Nuninuni Crystal to compel those hit to undress, so they could get colds. However, after Dappu is subjected to its effect, the Nuninuni gun is taken by a girl named Emi with Yellow Racer using it against him to defeat him. Once enlarged, Oopa uses his shampoo, bathhouse tubs, and geysers to fight RV Robo before being destroyed.
- HH Deeo (ヒューヒューデーオ, HyūHyū Dēo): Bowzock's best pitcher, Deeo is a baseball-themed monster sent by Ritchihiker to use his Pitch Bomb baseballs to destroy everything with Zonette using him as a means to get over her frustrations over Red Racer. However, as the other Carrangers hold Deeo off, Kyousuke masters the Invisible Swing to counter the Pitch Bomb. Enlarging as a last resort, Deeo gets destroyed by RV Robo.
- WW Waritcho (ワリワリワリッチョ, WariWari Waritcho): An Archaeopteryx-like alien who is Bowzock's best excavator with a jet pack and pickaxe, Waritcho is sent by Ritchihiker to find the asteroid holding Pegasus Thunder and Dragon Cruiser. However, the Gorotsuki frees the legendary vehicles by accident as he pursue them to Earth and captures Dragon Cruiser alongside Naoki. However, with Red Racer and Pegasus Cruiser save their friends as Waritcho is retrained by Dragon Cruiser to be blasted by Pegasus Thunder's Final Burning.
- The Boso Sentai Zokuranger (暴走戦隊ゾクレンジャー, Bōsō Sentai Zokurenjā) was founded by SS Pamaan. While they originally used the Zokuranger Ball, the Zokurangers obtain the Zokuren Bazooka and Zonnette's Fanbelt Crystal necklace to power it. But SS Pamaan is killed.
  - SS Pamaan (スースーパマーン, Sū Sū Pamān): Bowzock's best hero researcher who wields a double-barreled laser gun and a sword similar to Red Racer. Pamaan is sent to Earth by Ritchhiker to study the Carrangers and defeat them. This leads Pamaan to create his personal Super Sentai team with four Gorotsuki: The Zokurangers. As the leader of the Zokurangers, calling himself Zoku Red (ゾクレッド, Zokkureddo), Pamaan is caught off guard by Radiatta as he has his team fall back. After getting the Zokuren Bazooka, Pamaan kidnaps Radiatta to get an advantage on the Carrangers. Luckily, Radiatta uses her magic to assume Gyunamo's form to trick Paman in freeing her so the Carrangers can defeat his team. Though he enlarges after eating imo-youkan, Pamaan is destroyed while in the middle of declaring the name of his ultimate weapon's attack: ("Great Galaxy Blitzkrieg Science Darkness Sword: Lightning Blitzkrieg Plasma Cyber Aurora Centrifugal Gravity Super Thunder..." (大銀河電撃科学暗黒剣・稲妻電撃プラズマサイバーオーロラ遠心重力スーパーサンダー... Dai Ginga Dengeki Kagaku Ankoku Ken Inazuma Dengeki Purazuma Saibā Ōrora Enshin Jūryoku Sūpā Sandā...)).
  - Zoku Blue (ゾクブルー, Zokuburū): A gorilla/police officer-themed Gorotsuki who fought with Blue Racer. He fought with a butcher's knife hooked with a chain to a sickle and later wield two guns similar to Blue Racer's weapons.
  - Zoku Green (ゾクグリーン, Zokugurīn): A frog/fish/soldier Gorotsuki who fought with Green Racer. Originally, he was the bartender of BB Saloon. He first wielded an axe and later fought with a musket-like cannon.
  - Zoku Yellow (ゾクイエロー, Zokuierō): A chicken/aircraft pilot Gorotsuki who fought with Yellow Racer. He fought with a lance-like weapon, but later with two round knives similar to Yellow Racer's weapons.
  - Zoku Pink (ゾクピンク, Zokupinku): A female white cat/Dogū-themed Gorotsuki who fought with Pink Racer. She fought with a rake originally but later fought with a bow similar to pink racer. She and Zonnette were the only female regulars in the BB Saloon.
- AA Abanba (アーアーアバンバ, ĀĀ Abanba): Bowzock's best orangutan-themed shaman whose staff allows her to invisible, she is summoned by Gynamo as part of a plan to sacrifice the Carrangers after falling for Ritchihiker's notion that they need to appease a space demon responsible for the Bowzock's losing streak. Capturing the male Carrangers, Abanba straps them to a rocket before beginning the ritual. However, Natsumi and Yoko use the Carnavic to find their team mates while countering Abanba's invisibility. After being defeated with the Navi Blaster, Abanba enlarges and battles RV Robo and Sirender. After Sirender destroys her staff, Abanba is destroyed by RV Robo.
- CC Chakkoo (チャーチャーチャッコー, ChāChā Chakkō): Bowzock's best grasshopper-themed insect collector who uses electrified bug nets and fires energy eyeballs from his eyes. Chakkoo is used by Zelmonda to capture children in Japan, Ichitarou among them, as part of a scheme to convert them into new Bowzock members by planting them in Bowzock Pots and alter their DNA. When Signalman attempts to save Ichitaro, Chakko uses the officer's need to obey the rules against him. But the Carrangers arrive with Chakkoo enlarging in response, trapping RV Robo in a net before being destroyed by Sirender.
- VV Goriin (ヴゥーヴゥーゴリーン, VūVū Gorīn): Bowzock's best gold medalist, the Olympic torch-headed Goriin can use his medal to access weapons based on various Olympic events, ranging from Goriin Ribbon to Goriin Boxing gloves. He is sent after the Power Stone, a legendary gem, in a plan to destroy Earth by exposing it to Bowzock water. His search leads him to Princess Karen Dalen of the country of Bibalt with Naoki getting her to safety while attempting to take Goriin's medal. Once losing his medal to the Carrangers, Goriin is forced to enlarge as he dies fighting RV Robo.
- TT Terurin (テーテーテルリン, TēTē Terurin): Bowzock's best adding machine/weighing scale-themed tutor, the nerdy Terurin offers his help to the children in doing their summer homework for them in return for watermelons for a Bowzock melon splitting contest. However, what the children misunderstood he wanted how melons, Terurin decides to turns them into watermelon as payment for his services. But after Kyousuke and Minoru reconcile their differences, Terurin is defeated by Red Racer's Twincam Crash and then enlarges before being destroyed by RV Robo.
- DD Donmo (ドードードンモ, DōDō Donmo): Bowzock's best maniacal cell phone-themed personal shopper, he uses the cell phones on his wrists to order special weapons from the Intergalactic Telephone Shopping company which is delivered to him via rocket. Using the Skyscissors Shears he ordered, Dommo fights the Carrangers and uses Finisher Beam Repulser-An apron to deflect the Giga Formula. Despite a call delay and then RV Robo force deflecting the items back into the rockets, unable to order imo-youkan, Dommo succeeds in getting the Robo Slipper banana peel to get RV Robo on its back and then subjects it to personally initialed 100 grade bombs before ordering the Hero Sayonara Cannon to finish the Carrangers off. Luckily, having made a trip to Hokkaido to get his team new weapon after accidentally sending it there, Green Racer arrives with the Giga Booster which easily destroys Dommo and his weapon.
- XX Mileeno (クスクスミレーノ, KusuKusu Mirēno): Bowzock's best pizza chef, the Italian-accented Gorotsuki who attempts to talk Gynamo into executing a plan to turn the Carrangers into a "Carranger Pizza". But as the Bowzock are too busy with the Bowzock Matsuri, Mileeno decides to act on his own. Making up a lie of law-breaking pizza to distract Signalman, Mileeno attacks the Carrangers before forcing Pegasus Thunder and Dragon Cruiser to get the heroes into a massive oven to bake them. After finally straightening out his own life and intentions, Signalman frees the Carrangers as they work together to defeat Mileeno. Afterwards, Mileeno ate an Imoyoukan pizza before being destroyed by Sirender & RV Robo.
- HH Wasshoishoi (ホイホイワッショイショイ, HoiHoi Wasshoishoi): Bowzock's best Mikoshi-themed festival coordinator, he is placed in charge of the Bowzock's Bowzock Matsuri with Ichitarou as this year's sacrifice at Mt. Sunatori. However, due to the Carrangers' intervention, Ritchihiker gets hit by the lightning as Signalman gets Ichitarou to safety. Furious that they ruined the festival, Wasshoishoi gets defeated by Signalman and eats Imoyoukan before coating RV Robo in a candy candy cocoon. Luckily, Sirender frees RV Robo and then destroys Wasshoishoi.
- ZZ Gyuuri (ヅケヅケギューリー, ZukeZuke Gyūri): A shopkeeper/pickling barrel-themed monster who is Bowzock's biggest lover of kimchi. He piloted the RV Robo when it came under Bowzock control, with a row of explosives strapped to it. While VRV Robo & RV Robo battled, Red Racer managed to sneak inside the RV Robo, and in one of the best-remembered scenes in the show, fought Gyuuri on top of the waist-mounted explosives (halting RV Robo in the process). Red Racer managed to send the monster hurtling to the ground before shooting the bomb off and knocking it onto him. Gyuuri survived somehow and enlarged himself. Killed by VRV Robo.
- UU Ussu (ウスウスウッス, UsuUsu Ussu): A tiger/strongman-themed Bowzock who drank Gekibaka (撃馬鹿, "Violent Idiot") drinks to become mindlessly powerful. He rode a motorcycle, which he also poured a Gekibaka drink into the gas tank. This caused the speed to increase and triggered a massive forest fire. In battle, he could breathe fire as well, though this was strengthened with the help of the drink. Killed by VRV Robo.
- FF Munchori (フィルフィルムンチョリ, FiruFiru Munchori): Bowzock's scandal photographer. He was sent by Zelmonda to see if Zonette was having an affair. At one point, he gave the Carrangers embarrassing photographs of themselves messing up. Was pummeled by RadiaCar Robo before being killed by VRV Robo.
- GG Boon (ゴンゴンボーン, GonGon Bōn): Bowzock's best coin purse-themed errand guy. When he first appeared, he was cutting a turn in front of Kyousuke when he was attempting to buy some boxed lunches for the others. Before they battled, unfortunately for him, he was hungry during that time too and could not put up much of a fight. This was also when SignalMan (who was drugged into being evil by the poisoned atmosphere of his planet) ambushed Kyosuke too. Killed by VRV Robo.
- BB Koiya (ブンブンコイヤ, BunBun Koiya): Bowzock's best gardener. His best attack is sowing seeds onto his opponents that wrapped them in vines. These vines would sprout flowers that would attract Space Bees that sting them to death. After almost all of the Space Bees were destroyed, Koiya gave his remaining Space Bee a piece of his Imo-youkan, which he ate some of as well. While the Space Bee was killed by Sirender, Koiya was killed by VRV Robo.
- PP Chiipuri (プリプリチープリ, PuriPuri Chīpuri): Bowzock's best make-up artist. He was used to make the owner of Imocho young again with youth cream supplied by Exhaus to allow for him to continue making the imo-youkan they needed for growth (since he was exhausted and was thinking of closing the shop due to his age). SignalMan was also affected by the youth cream and temporarily became a child. Chiipuri accidentally destroyed the Norishiron 12 by using the youth cream on it, turning it back into its original cardboard form. He ultimately was destroyed by VRV Robo.
- CC Patchoone (チャムチャムパッチョーネ, ChamuChamu Patchōne): Bowzock's best animal trainer. He was sent to gain back the Beager, an Earth dog-resembling alien that eats concrete used by Exhaus to destroy roads and highways throughout the universe by multiplying its numbers. However, the creature escaped and was ultimately adopted by Naoki, who protected it from its masters. Wielded an electrified whip and could shoot beams from his eyepiece, during battle. Killed by VRV Robo.
- OO Batton (オロオロバットン, OroOro Batton): A vampire bat-themed Gorotsuki Bowzock's best prankster that was sent to distract the Carrangers by pretending to be their friend, ultimately becoming friends with Minoru and joining in his celebrations of all things Osaka. However, his true intention was to lure the Carranger and their mech into a pit-trap set up by the Bowzock under the city to trap them and make them easily vulnerable for attack. He wielded a staff in battle with a hammer on one end and a drill on the other. After parts of both VRV Robo and RV Robo were damaged by Batton (VRV Robo's torso and RV Robo's limbs), Minoru ultimately mixed and matched the remaining mechs into Scramble Intersection Robo, which ultimately destroyed Batton after not heeding to Minoru's final pleas of friendship.
- SS Sutatanzo (スタスタスタタンゾ, SutaSuta Sutatanzo): Bowzock's best gas attendant who appears in Carranger vs. Ohranger. He was sent to use the three tanks of gasoline Exhaus gave the Bowzock to make cars fly. He could breathe fire. His actions end up sending Gorou(OhRed) into space when the gas is placed within his Red Jetter, making him fly into the sky leading to him becoming captured by the Bowzock. Killed by VRV Robo.
- MM Shuurisukii (メチャメチャシューリスキー, MechaMecha Shūrisukī): Bowzock's best auto mechanic, who was looking for a magical wrench that could make the ultimate modifications to any object, which turned out to be owned by Natsumi. He managed to steal it, turn it wretched, and used it to adapt the vehicle it was using into the ultimate battle weapon for Exhaus, with it. Yellow Racer eventually gained back the wrench and destroyed the battle vehicle. Killed by VRV Robo.
- EE Musubinofu (エンエンムスビノフ, EnEn Musubinofu): Bowzock's best love letter-themed marriage master. Used by Zelmonda to cheer up his friend, Gynamo by suggestion of Exhaus. His plan was to use this alien to force Zonette into marrying Gynamo through some sort of legality, to the point that the duo together would finally blow up Earth as a honeymoon present. He could shoot arrows with a photograph in the middle, and whatever he hit (living or otherwise) fell in love with the subject of the picture. After EE Musubinofu shot an arrow on Zonette to marry Gynamo, Kyousuke faced him down in combat without transforming to prove his love to Zonnette, stabbing him with a sword prior to its growth, where it is killed by a combination of Radietta's Radicar and four of VRV Fighters (minus Fire Fighter) with the Victory Twister attack.

==== Others ====
- Elekinta (エレキンタ, Erekinta): A legendary electric battery-themed space biker who bestows power to whoever can break the speed limit. Though Zelmoda was fearful at first, he overcomes his fear of lightning to summon Elekinta who upgrades his bike so they can use team attacks. Luckily, Green Racer ultimately stops both Elekinta and Zemolda after eating grilled unagi to overcome his own fear. After enlarging himself with the electric current of both bikes, Elekinta is destroyed by RV Robo and Sirender.
- Ballinger Z (バリンガーZ, Baringā Zetto): This grenade-themed monster never appeared in the series, but it was seen in promotional pictures fighting the VRV Fighters. It was not used in the show due to legal problems with Dynamic Productions. Also, it bears a similarity to Mazinger Z, hence the lawsuit from Dynamic Productions.
- Helmedor (ヘルメドー, Herumedō): A biker alien appearing in Megaranger vs. Carranger who wanted to build a motorcycle racing ramp through the Milky Way. He used Picot to grant his wish for a planet destroying laser cannon which he used to destroy the planet Jail, the prison planet where he was locked up for 200 years. He was eventually taken under Shibolena's control via her magic kiss. Killed by RV Robo.

== Episodes ==
| No. | Title | Directed by | Written by | Original release date |
|---|---|---|---|---|
| 1 | "Fighting for Traffic Safety"; Transliteration: "Tatakau Kōtsū Anzen" (Japanese: 戦う交通安全) | Yoshiaki Kobayashi | Yoshio Urasawa | March 1, 1996 |
| 2 | "Dancing Noise Pollution"; Transliteration: "Odoru Sōonkōgai" (Japanese: 踊る騒音公害) | Yoshiaki Kobayashi | Yoshio Urasawa | March 8, 1996 |
| 3 | "The Beginner's Mark of Justice"; Transliteration: "Seigi no Shoshinsha Māku" (Japanese: 正義の初心者印(マーク)) | Taro Sakamoto | Yoshio Urasawa | March 15, 1996 |
| 4 | "A Red Light to Enlarging"; Transliteration: "Kyodaika ni Akashingō" (Japanese: 巨大化に赤信号) | Taro Sakamoto | Yoshio Urasawa | March 22, 1996 |
| 5 | "Up Ahead, Gekisou Fusion"; Transliteration: "Kono Saki Gekisō Gattai" (Japanese: この先激走合体) | Katsuya Watanabe | Yoshio Urasawa | March 29, 1996 |
| 6 | "We are... One-Way Traffic"; Transliteration: "Watashitachi... Ippōtsūkō" (Japanese: 私達・・・一方通行) | Katsuya Watanabe | Yoshio Urasawa | April 5, 1996 |
| 7 | "Blue Has no Entry?!"; Transliteration: "Burū wa Shinnyū Kinshi?!" (Japanese: 青(ブルー)は進入禁止？！) | Ryuta Tasaki | Yoshio Urasawa | April 12, 1996 |
| 8 | "Transformation Brace Lost"; Transliteration: "Henshin Buresu Fukeitai" (Japanese: 変身腕輪(ブレス)不携帯) | Ryuta Tasaki | Yoshio Urasawa | April 19, 1996 |
| 9 | "A U-Turn to the Stars"; Transliteration: "Sutā e no Yū Tān" (Japanese: 星(スター)へのUターン) | Taro Sakamoto | Yoshio Urasawa | April 26, 1996 |
| 10 | "A Great Reversal!! Bicycle Training"; Transliteration: "Dai Gyakuten!! Jitensha Kyōshū" (Japanese: 大逆転！！自転車教習) | Taro Sakamoto | Hirohisa Soda | May 3, 1996 |
| 11 | "The Overweight of Fury"; Transliteration: "Ikari no Jūryō Ōbā" (Japanese: 怒りの重量オーバー) | Katsuya Watanabe | Naruhisa Arakawa | May 10, 1996 |
| 12 | "The Signalman Who Came From Space"; Transliteration: "Uchū Kara Kita Shingō Yarō" (Japanese: 宇宙から来た信号野郎) | Katsuya Watanabe | Yoshio Urasawa | May 17, 1996 |
| 13 | "Dispatch!! The Proud Emergency Vehicle"; Transliteration: "Shutsudō!! Jiman no Kinkyū Sharyō" (Japanese: 出動！！自慢の緊急車両) | Katsuya Watanabe | Yoshio Urasawa | May 24, 1996 |
| 14 | "Full Acceleration to Hellish Lightning"; Transliteration: "Ikazuchi Jigoku e Furuakuseru" (Japanese: 雷地獄へフルアクセル) | Ryuta Tasaki | Hirohisa Soda | May 31, 1996 |
| 15 | "Evil With A Learner's Permit in Love"; Transliteration: "Aku Made Karimen Ren'ai Chū" (Japanese: 悪まで仮免恋愛中) | Ryuta Tasaki | Naruhisa Arakawa | June 7, 1996 |
| 16 | "Bad Wisdom, Merging Caution"; Transliteration: "Waru-jie Gōryū Chūi" (Japanese: ワル知恵合流注意) | Taro Sakamoto | Yoshio Urasawa | June 14, 1996 |
| 17 | "Wearing Authority, Head-On Collision!"; Transliteration: "Oshi Kise Shōmenshōtotsu!" (Japanese: 押し着せ正面衝突！) | Taro Sakamoto | Yoshio Urasawa | June 21, 1996 |
| 18 | "A Lying Heart Under Adjustment"; Transliteration: "Usotsuki Hāto Seibi Chū" (Japanese: うそつきハート整備中) | Katsuya Watanabe | Hirohisa Soda | June 28, 1996 |
| 19 | "The Hit-And-Run Girl of Love!"; Transliteration: "Koi no Atenige Musume！" (Japanese: 恋のあて逃げ娘!) | Katsuya Watanabe | Naruhisa Arakawa | July 5, 1996 |
| 20 | "Test Drive the Ultimate Famous Cars!!"; Transliteration: "Shijō Saikō no Meisha!!" (Japanese: 試乗最高の名車！！) | Ryuta Tasaki | Yoshio Urasawa | July 12, 1996 |
| 21 | "The Carnavi That Surpassed Carnavi"; Transliteration: "Kānabi o Koeta Kānabi" (Japanese: カーナビを超えたカーナビ) | Ryuta Tasaki | Yoshio Urasawa | July 19, 1996 |
| 22 | "The Tragic Traffic Rule Habit"; Transliteration: "Higeki no Kōtsū Rūru Taishitsu" (Japanese: 悲劇の交通ルール体質) | Taro Sakamoto | Yoshio Urasawa | July 26, 1996 |
| 23 | "Overheating For A Princess"; Transliteration: "Ōjosama ni Ōbāhīto!" (Japanese: 王女様にオーバーヒート！) | Taro Sakamoto | Naruhisa Arakawa | August 2, 1996 |
| 24 | "Urgent Launch?! New Leader"; Transliteration: "Kyū Hasshin?! Nyū Rīdā" (Japanese: 急発進？！ニューリーダー) | Katsuya Watanabe | Yoshio Urasawa | August 9, 1996 |
| 25 | "The Mysterious Intruding Girl!"; Transliteration: "Nazonazo Warikomi Musume!" (Japanese: ナゾナゾ割り込み娘！) | Katsuya Watanabe | Naruhisa Arakawa | August 16, 1996 |
| 26 | "The Nonstop Home Delivery Weapon"; Transliteration: "Nonsutoppu Takuhai Buki" (Japanese: ノンストップ宅配武器) | Ryuta Tasaki | Naruhisa Arakawa | August 23, 1996 |
| 27 | "The Crossroads Of Transferring Away From Home..."; Transliteration: "Tanshinfunin no Bunkiten..." (Japanese: 単身赴任の分岐点・・・) | Ryuta Tasaki | Yoshio Urasawa | August 30, 1996 |
| 28 | "Farewell, Signalman!!"; Transliteration: "Saraba Shingō Yarō!!" (Japanese: さらば信号野郎！！) | Taro Sakamoto | Yoshio Urasawa | September 6, 1996 |
| 29 | "The Unexpected Great Monster Accident!!"; Transliteration: "Yoki Senu Daikaijū Jiko!!" (Japanese: 予期せぬ大怪獣事故！！) | Taro Sakamoto | Yoshio Urasawa | September 13, 1996 |
| 30 | "A Shocking Debut! Working Cars!!"; Transliteration: "Shōgeki no Debyū! Hataraku Kuruma!!" (Japanese: 衝撃のデビュー! はたらく車！！) | Katsuya Watanabe | Yoshio Urasawa | September 20, 1996 |
| 31 | "It's a Full Model Change! VRV Robo"; Transliteration: "Furu Moderu Chenji da! Bui Aru Bui Robo" (Japanese: フルモデルチェンジだ！VRVロボ) | Katsuya Watanabe | Yoshio Urasawa | September 27, 1996 |
| 32 | "RV Robo's Wrong-Way Run"; Transliteration: "Āru Bui Robo Dai Gyakusō!" (Japanese: RVロボ大逆走！) | Katsuya Watanabe | Yoshio Urasawa | October 4, 1996 |
| 33 | "Awaken! Gekisou Dappu"; Transliteration: "O-mezame! Gekisō Dappu" (Japanese: おめざめ！激走ダップ) | Noboru Matsui | Naruhisa Arakawa | October 11, 1996 |
| 34 | "Meddling in Love, the Intruding Girl"; Transliteration: "Koi no Sewayaki Warikomi Musume" (Japanese: 恋の世話焼き割り込み娘) | Noboru Matsui | Naruhisa Arakawa | October 18, 1996 |
| 35 | "The Traitorous Signalman"; Transliteration: "Uragiri no Shingō Yarō" (Japanese: 裏切りの信号野郎) | Taro Sakamoto | Yoshio Urasawa | October 25, 1996 |
| 36 | "The Suspicious Exhaust Purging Operation"; Transliteration: "Ayashii Haigasu Issō Sakusen" (Japanese: 怪しい排ガス一掃作戦) | Taro Sakamoto | Yoshio Urasawa | November 1, 1996 |
| 37 | "The Dreadful Universal Highway Project"; Transliteration: "Kyōfu no Daiuchū Haiwei Keikaku" (Japanese: 恐怖の大宇宙ハイウェイ計画) | Ryuta Tasaki | Yoshio Urasawa | November 8, 1996 |
| 38 | "Back Alright!? Imo-Youkan Life"; Transliteration: "Bakku Ōrai!? Imo-Yōkan Jinsei" (Japanese: バックオーライ！？イモヨーカン人生) | Ryuta Tasaki | Hirohisa Soda | November 15, 1996 |
| 39 | "Love Roads!! The Space Pet"; Transliteration: "Dōro Suki suki!! Uchū Petto" (Japanese: 道路好き好き！！宇宙ペット) | Katsuya Watanabe | Yoshio Urasawa | November 22, 1996 |
| 40 | "Naniwhatever Anyway, A Scramble Intersection Robo!?"; Transliteration: "Naniwa Tomoare Sukuranburu Kōsa Robo!?" (Japanese: 浪速ともあれスクランブル交差ロボ！？) | Katsuya Watanabe | Naruhisa Arakawa | November 29, 1996 |
| 41 | "The Reckless Dash Emperor's Frightful Fuel Check"; Transliteration: "Bōsō Kōtei Senritsu no Nenryō Chekku" (Japanese: 暴走皇帝戦慄の燃料チェック) | Ryuta Tasaki | Naruhisa Arakawa | December 6, 1996 |
| 42 | "Engine Stall On All Cars! Desperate Situation for the Giant Robo!!"; Transliteration: "Zensha Ensuto! Kyodai Robo Zettai Zetsumei!!" (Japanese: 全車エンスト！巨大ロボ絶体絶命！！) | Ryuta Tasaki | Naruhisa Arakawa | December 13, 1996 |
| 43 | "Merry Carmagic Christmas!!"; Transliteration: "Merī Kurumajikku Kurisumasu!!" (Japanese: メリークルマジッククリスマス！！) | Ryuta Tasaki | Naruhisa Arakawa | December 20, 1996 |
| 44 | "The Persistently, Wacky Gekisou Chase!"; Transliteration: "Fukutsu no Chikichiki Gekisō Cheisu!" (Japanese: 不屈のチキチキ激走チェイス！) | Noboru Takemoto | Hirohisa Soda | January 10, 1997 |
| 45 | "The Starting Point of True Love"; Transliteration: "Honto no Koi no Shuppatsuten" (Japanese: ホントの恋の出発点) | Noboru Takemoto | Naruhisa Arakawa | January 17, 1997 |
| 46 | "Suddenly Ineffective!? Transformation Power"; Transliteration: "Totsuzen Shikkō!? Henshin Pawā" (Japanese: 突然失効！？変身パワー) | Katsuya Watanabe | Yoshio Urasawa | January 24, 1997 |
| 47 | "Hit and Break!? The Death-Defying Space Drive"; Transliteration: "Atatte Kudakero!? Kesshi no Uchū Doraibu" (Japanese: 当って砕けろ！？決死の宇宙ドライブ) | Katsuya Watanabe | Yoshio Urasawa | January 31, 1997 |
| 48 (Final) | "Forever Traffic Safety!!"; Transliteration: "Itsu Made mo Kōtsū Anzen!!" (Japanese: いつまでも交通安全！！) | Katsuya Watanabe | Yoshio Urasawa | February 7, 1997 |

=== V-Cinema releases ===
- Gekisou Sentai Carranger Super Video
- Gekisou Sentai Carranger vs. Ohranger (Takes place between Episodes 38 and 39 of Gekisou Sentai Carranger)
- Denji Sentai Megaranger vs. Carranger (Takes place between Episodes 39 and 40 of Denji Sentai Megaranger)

== Cast ==
- Kyosuke Jinnai (陣内 恭介, Jinnai Kyõsuke): Yūji Kishi (岸 祐二, Kishi Yūji)
- Naoki Domon (土門 直樹, Domon Naoki): Yoshihiro Masujima (増島 愛浩, Masujima Yoshihiro)
- Minoru Uesugi (上杉 実, Uesugi Minoru): Yoshihiro Fukuda (福田 佳弘, Fukuda Yoshihiro)
- Natsumi Shinohara (志乃原 菜摘, Shinohara Natsumi): Yuka Motohashi (本橋 由香, Motohashi Yuka)
- Yoko Yagami (八神 洋子, Yagami Yōko): Atsuko Kurusu (来栖 あつこ, Kurusu Atsuko)
- Zonnette (ゾンネット, Zonnetto): Rika Nanase (七瀬 理香, Nanase Rika)
- Souichirou Tenma (天馬 総一郎, Tenma Sōichirō): Ed Yamaguchi (エド 山口, Edo Yamaguchi)
- Yoshie Tenma (天馬 良江, Tenma Yoshie): Yoshimi Iwasaki (岩崎 良美, Iwasaki Yoshimi)
- Ichitaro Tenma (天馬市太郎, Tenma Ichitarō): Ryuji Teraoka (寺岡 龍治, Teraoka Ryūji)
- Radietta Fanbelt (ラジエッタ・ファンベルト, Rajietta Fanberuto): Megumi Hamamatsu (濱松 恵, Hamamatsu Megumi; 25), Misaki Sudō (須藤 実咲, Sudō Misaki; 34, 45, 48)
- Imocho Shopkeeper (芋長主人, Imochō Shūjin): Tarō Nanjū (南州 太郎, Nanjū Tarō)
- Yaokatsu Shopkeeper (八百勝主人, Yaokatsu Shūjin): Chū Takatsuki (高月 忠, Takatsuki Chū)

=== Voice cast ===
- Dappu (ダップ): Mari Maruta (まるた まり, Maruta Mari)
- Signalman (シグナルマン, Shigunaruman): Hōchū Ōtsuka (大塚 芳忠, Ōtsuka Hōchū)
- VRV Master (VRVマスター, Bui Aru Bui Masutā): Kiyoshi Kobayashi (小林 清志, Kobayashi Kiyoshi)
- Sigue (シグエ, Shigue): Miki Nagasawa (長沢 美樹, Nagasawa Miki)
- Sigtarou (シグタロウ, Shigutarō): Yuki Sawada (沢田 雄希, Sawada Yūki)→Hiromasa Ikegami (池上 央将, Ikegami Hiromasa)
- President Gynamo (総長ガイナモ, Sōchō Gainamo): Hiroshi Ōtake (大竹 宏, Ōtake Hiroshi)
- Deputy Leader Zelmoda (副長ゼルモダ, Fukuchō Zerumoda): Kyōsei Tsukui (津久井 教生, Tsukui Kyōsei)
- Inventor Grotch (発明家グラッチ, Hatsumeika Guratchi): Takashi Nagasako (長嶝 高士, Nagasako Takashi)
- Instructor Ritchhiker (リッチハイカー教授, Ritchihaikā Kyōju): Nobuo Tanaka (田中 信夫, Tanaka Nobuo)
- Space Cockroach Goki-chan (宇宙ゴキブリ・ゴキちゃん, Uchū Gokiburi Goki-chan): Toshiharu Sakurai (桜井 敏治, Sakurai Toshiharu)
- Reckless Dash Emperor Exhaus (暴走皇帝エグゾス, Bōsōgōtei Eguzosu): Osamu Kobayashi (小林 修, Kobayashi Osamu)

== Songs ==
Opening themes

- "Gekisou Sentai Carranger" (激走戦隊カーレンジャー, Gekisō Sentai Kārenjā)
  - Lyrics: Yukinojō Mori (森 雪之丞, Mori Yukinojō)
  - Composition & Arrangement: Takashi Shōji (小路 隆, Shōji Takashi)
  - Artist: Naritaka Takayama (高山 成孝, Takayama Naritaka)
  - Episodes: 1–13, 48 (End Credits)
- "Gekisou Sentai Carranger ~Full Accel Version~" (激走戦隊カーレンジャー～フルアクセルヴァージョン～, Gekisō Sentai Kārenjā ~Furu Akuseru Vājon~)
  - Lyrics: Yukinojō Mori
  - Composition: Takashi Shōji
  - Arrangement: Keiichi Oku
  - Artist: Naritaka Takayama
  - Episodes: 14–48

Ending theme

- "Tengoku Samba" (天国サンバ, Tengoku Sanba; "Paradise Samba")
  - Lyrics: Yukinojō Mori
  - Composition & Arrangement: Takashi Shōji
  - Artist: Naritaka Takayama
