= Takeshi Suzuki =

Takeshi Suzuki may refer to:

- Takeshi Suzuki (academic) (鈴木 斌, 1932–2005), Japanese professor of Urdu
- Takeshi Suzuki (alpine skier) (鈴木 猛史, born 1988), Japanese Paralympic alpine skier
- Takeshi Suzuki (baseball), Japanese baseball player, played in 1954 Nippon Professional Baseball season

== See also ==
- Takashi Suzuki (disambiguation)
