= Ryosuke Sawai =

Japanese baseball player

- Infielder
- Born: March 9, 1978 (age 47); Choshi, Chiba, Japan
- Batted: Left Threw: Right

debut
- 1998, for the Chiba Lotte Marines

Last appearance
- 2003, for the Chiba Lotte Marines

Career statistics
- Batting average: .225
- Home runs: 6
- Runs batted in: 19

Teams
- Chiba Lotte Marines (1998, 2000–2003)

Ryosuke Sawai (born March 9, 1978, in Choshi, Chiba, Japan) is a Japanese former baseball infielder in Nippon Professional Baseball. He played for the Chiba Lotte Marines in 1998 and from 2000 to 2003.

Prior to playing professionally, he attended Choshi Shogyo High School. In 1997, at 19 years old, he played briefly in the minor league system of the San Diego Padres of Major League Baseball. With the AZL Padres, he hit .100 in 10 at-bats.

He assumed a utility role upon joining the Marines and was used infrequently. In his first year with the club, he was hitless in two at-bats. In 2000, he hit .200 with a home run in 10 at-bats and in 2001, he hit .263 in 19 at-bats. He hit .176 with three home runs and eight RBI in 68 at-bats in 2002 and in 2003, his final season, he hit .279 with two home runs and nine RBI in 61 at-bats.

Overall, Sawai hit .225 with six home runs and 19 RBI in 160 at-bats spread over 90 games in five seasons.
