= Michinao Yamamura =

Japanese baseball player

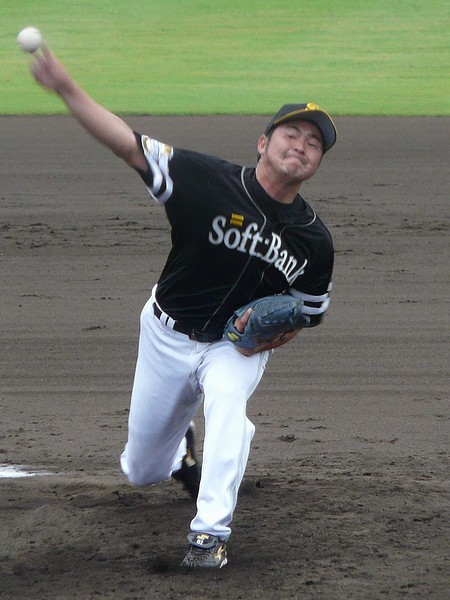
- Pitcher
- Born: December 5, 1978 (age 47); Iyo-gun, Ehime Japan
- Batted: Right Threw: Right

debut
- 2005, for the Fukuoka SoftBank Hawks

Last appearance
- 2007, for the Fukuoka SoftBank Hawks

Career statistics
- Pitching record: 2-2
- ERA: 3.58
- Strikeouts: 12

Teams
- Fukuoka Daiei Hawks/Fukuoka SoftBank Hawks (2005–2007)

Michinao Yamamura (山村 路直, born December 5, 1978) is a Japanese former professional baseball pitcher who played in Nippon Professional Baseball for the Fukuoka Daiei Hawks in 2005 and the Fukuoka SoftBank Hawks in 2006 and 2007.

== Career ==
He was born in Iyo-gun, Ehime, Japan. Prior to playing professionally, he attended Matsuyama Chuo High School and then Kyushu Community College.

He made one relief appearance in both 2005 and 2006, posting ERAs of 0.00 each time. In 2007, he was 2–2 with a 3.81 ERA in 23 relief appearances, striking out 12 batters in 26 innings. Overall, he was 2–2 with a 3.58 ERA in 25 Nippon Pro games.

He had signed to play with the independent San Diego Surf Dawgs of the Arizona Winter League in 2009, but it is unknown whether he played with them. That year, he did pitch for the Sultanes de Monterrey of the Mexican League, going 0–3 with an 8.22 ERA in 15 1/3 innings of work. He allowed 24 hits and four home runs.
