= Mariko Ooe =

Japanese announcer (born 1978)

- 大江 麻理子
- Born: 21 October 1978 (age 47); Buzen, Fukuoka, Japan
- Other names: Mariko Matsumoto (松本 麻理子, Matsumoto Mariko; real name); Maririn (まりりん); OeMari (オエマリ); OoMari (オオマリ, ŌMari); Ooedon (大江どん, Ōedon)
- Education: Ferris University Department of Literature
- Years active: 2001 (along with Masaru Akahira)–
- Employer: TV Tokyo
- Television: Current; World Business Satellite; Former; Shutsubotsu! Ado Machikku Tengoku; Complicated Summers2; News Morning Satellite
- Spouse: Ooki Matsumoto (m. 2014)
- Website: Announcer Park

Mariko Ooe (大江 麻理子, Ōe Mariko; born 21 October 1978) is a newsroom announcer for TV Tokyo. She was born in Buzen, Fukuoka. She is married to Ooki Matsumoto, the founder and President of Monex, Inc.

== Biography ==
Ooe graduated from East Chikushi Gakuen High School Teruikan Junior High School and Ferris University Department of Literature Japanese literature. She studied abroad at Tsinghua University in Beijing, China, becoming proficient in Chinese. During her college years, she lived in Jiyūgaoka except for her period of studying abroad.

She joined TV Tokyo as an announcer in 2001 after graduating from university. She joined along with Masaru Akahira (who later turned to a freelance announcer from 2009).

During her tenure with TV Tokyo, Ooe has appeared in various genres such as news, information and variety. In the crown programme of journalist Akira Ikegami that is broadcast on an irregular occasion as a special programme, she often serves as a studio assistant, or goes to the coverage alone or in collaboration with Ikegami. On the other hand, she appeared in various kinds of information and variety shows such as Shutsubotsu! Ado Machikku Tengoku and Complicated Summers 2 and had various characters (Mariko Ooe#Episodes in regular showsas described later). She has also been consistently featured at the top of "Favorite Female Announcer Ranking".

In April 2013, she was appointed to the New York branch of the Tokyo office as an affiliate of TV Tokyo and handed it to TV Tokyo, United States (succeeding Rikako Suetake). In addition to regularly reporting from New York City on news programmes such as World Business Satellite, she was in charge of overseas interviews with Future Century Zipangu and special programmes.

She returned to Japan as a press caster in March 2014, serving as the main caster of World Business Satellite.

Ooe co-starred with Sayamao in Complicated Summers 2: Thanks 10th Anniversary "Members of the Championship Members' Large Assembly" 3 and a Half Hours SP in April 2017 for the first time in four years.

== Personal life ==
- She has a brother.
- Her hobbies are watching operas, reading, long baths, and viewing Mount Fuji, Tokyo Tower, etc. Her favourite book is Momo by Michael Ende.
- She became interested in China from the Three Kingdoms who read when she was young and have chosen I Ching for the subject of the university's graduation thesis. She is talking "China Otaku" by herself and also bright for Chinese pops.
- It is detailed about her influence of the past charge programmes or enka, and the artist whom she is good at karaoke is Teresa Teng. She sang karaoke three times in Complicated Summers2.
- On 7 October 2007, she registered in the Marrow Donor Program. A friend during her college years collapsed with leukemia, and triggered by the close observation of that fighting illness.
- Her motto is "Hope is higher than the sky." It is also used as title of her own newspaper column.
- On 21 December 2012, she appeared on a VTR broadcast in NHK General TV's Asaichi (premium talk guest: Summers).
- It was announced that she will appear in the 2014 TV Toky female announcer calendar as a celebration of the 50th anniversary of the opening, and Ooe was produced and released as the first calendar as a female announcer.

== Current programme appearances ==
=== Regular appearances ===
- World Business Satellite
  - Prior to her assignment to the New York Branch, she played for many years with Reporter of "Trend Egg" and Heitaro Ohama (TV Tokyo Announcer, later Press Counter Caster) as a sub-caster of World Business Satellite Saturday Edition which is not currently being broadcast. During her assignment to the branch office, she appeared live on Tuesdays from the branch's studio.
  - She was inaugurated as the main caster from 31 March 2014. Ohama who was in charge of other programmes at the end after his appearance on 28 September 2008 broadcast returned to the programme as a sub-caster for five and a half years.

== Former appearances ==
=== Regular appearances ===
- Kochira Keizai Henshū-chō (BS Japan)
- Ongaku-teki Ryūkō
- Mugendai no Gimon
- Otona no Tsubo (BS Japan)
- Kokoro no Sho
- Miyakeshiki koku go Drill
- Nikkei Special: Cumbria Kyūden
- Shutsubotsu! Ado Machikku Tengoku (Apr 2003 – 30 March 2013,
- Tokumitsu & Croket no "Meikyoku no Jikandesu" (4 Apr 2005 – 30 September 2006)
- Soku Hou! (Jul 2006 – Mar 2007, Tuesday responsible)
- Joshi Ana Cooking: Oshiete! Ryōri no Ana to Tsubo (8 Dec 2006 – 5 January 2007)
- Complicated Summers2 (3 Jan 2007, 13 April 2007 – 7 April 2013, First Assistant)
- Love×Golf (Oct 2007 – Mar 2008, narration responsible)
- News Break (Friday responsible)
- Ongaku Baka (15 Apr 2008 – 25 September 2010, until April 2010 it appeared in the name of "Maryves-chan", narration responsible)
- Eisei Damashī Season 2 (6 Jul – 21 September 2008, BS Japan, "J-Taro Sugisaku's Delusion Love -Women Who Passed by Me-" in charge of listeners in the corner)
- Yasuhiro Tase no Shūkan News Shinsho (4 Oct 2008 – 23 March 2013, programme progress)
- Yarisugi Koji (Mar 2009 – Sep 2011, "Wild Bomb Fortune Telling", later "Hello, This is a Wild Bomb" narration responsible)
- Ketchaku! Rekishi Mystery (Apr–Aug 2009, narration responsible)
- Nikkei Veritas Mariko Ooe no Moyamoya Talk (2 Jun 2009 – 19 March 2013, Radio Nikkei 1st)
- Mariko no Heya (4 Oct – 20 December 2009)
- Ryo Ishikawa Special Respect: Golf o Aisuru Hitobito e (Apr 2010 – Mar 2012, assistant bimonthly with Miho Ohashi et al.)
- Sekai no Kenchiku o Meguru!: Jinrui wa Nani o Tsukutte kita no ka (7 Jul – 11 August 2010 (Once a week, 6 times in total), BS Japan, narration responsible)
- Space News (7 Apr 2011 – 28 March 2013)
- Akira Ikegami no Gendai-shi Kōgi: Rekishi o Shireba News ga wakaru (BS Japan, 4 September 2011 – Mar 2013, assistant)
- News Morning Satellite (8 Apr 2013 – 28 February 2014, New York caster)

=== Annual and occasional appearances ===
- Zen Nihon Karaoke Grand Prix (2005–10, around late December every year)
- TX-V: Joshi-ana nabi (Nov 2008 –)
- Inaka ni Tomarō (Jan 2009 –, moderator at special occasions)
- Shujii ga Mitsukaru Shinryōjo 3-Jikan SP (15 Dec 2008, 16 Feb 6 Apr, 5 October 2009, 5 Apr 27 September 2010, sub-moderator at specials)
- Sunday Big Variety
  - "Go to See the World of Akira Ikegami" (5 Dec 2010, 6 Feb 3 April 2011)
  - "Emergency Report Special Number 'Akira Ikegami's Emergency Report Answer Why the Earthquake'" (20, 27 March 2011)
  - "Akira Ikegami's Emergency Live Broadcast Special 'The World was Surprised "Bin Laden Murder" Why Do Not You Understand Japanese Why Answer!'" (15 May 2011)
  - "Akira Ikegami's Emergency Live Broadcast Special 'Considering Energy'" (18 Sep 2011)
- Future Century Zipangu (3 Jun 2013 – Feb 2014) – In charge of the theme related to the United States in charge of local coverage

=== One-off programmes, etc. ===
- Geki-sei! Sports Today (representative appearance of authorized person in charge for 10 minutes on weekdays)
- Kodaibunmei Mystery: Takeshi no Shin Sekai Nanafushigi (3 Jan 2007, 1 January 2008, 1 January 2009, 4 January 2013)
- Do Tanki Tsumekomi Kyōiku! Gōwan! Coaching! (5 Mar 2007)
- Bakumon Business Kenkyūjo (20 Mar 2008)
- 2008 Summer Olympics relay (2008, reporter in Beijing)
- Nanu? Gyakuryū Research Taishō (2 Dec 2008, 14 April 2009, moderator with Tutorial)
- Moyamoya AriKen Oyaji (1 Jan 2009, comment appearance)
- Konya Kaimei! Mīra ga Abaku Sekai San Ō Mystery Tour (29 May 2009)
- Saikyō: Kai-1 Grand Prix (18 Dec 2009)
- Genchi Chōtatsu! Quiz Sōsaku Variety: Kurukuru Earth (26 Mar 2010)
- BS Japan Kaikyoku: 10 Shūnenkinen Bangumi: Utsukushī Chikyū no Sanka (22 May 2010 BS Japan)
- Akira Ikegami no Senkyo Special (11 Jul 2010)
- Akira Ikegami no Sensō o Kangaeru SPL Sensō wa Naze Hajimari, dō Owaru no ka (15 Aug 2010)
- Akira Ikegami no Sekai o Mi ni Iku (5 Dec 2010)
- Sumidagawa Fireworks Festival (last Saturday of July every year, in charge until 2010)
- Tokyu Silvester Concert (2003–10, held every 31 Dec)
- Harebare Tunnels Ryaku shite Tereton (10 Sep 2012)
- Akira Ikegami no Sō Senkyo Live (16 Dec 2012)
- Hōdō Tokubetsu Bangumi Ikegami Akira no "Nippon no dai gimon" (26 Mar 2013, special appearance from the New York branch)

=== TV dramas ===
- Genseishin Justirisers (as a newscaster)
- Tōbō-sha Orin Episode 18 "Competition! My Sister Doll" (23 Feb 2007, as Yasakae)
- Kō kō! Kyonshī Girl: Tokyo Denshidai Senki Episode 2 (19 Oct 2012)

=== TV anime ===
- Yakitate!! Japan (as an announcer)

== Bibliography ==
Essays

- "Fortune Telling and Modern People—The Present Condition of Fortunetelling and the Future" Tamamo No. 37, Ferris University Graduate School of Japanese Literature, Nov 2001, p. 124–138

=== Books ===
- Shutsubotsu! Ado Machikku Tengoku Tokyo Shitamachi Aruki (2006, Nikkei Business Publications "Nikkei BP Mook") ISBN 978-4-822-23206-1
- Joshi Ana Cooking―Oshiete! Ryōri no Ana to Tsubo vol.2 (2007, Nikkei Business Publications "Nikkei BP Mook" TV Tokyo programme text) ISBN 978-4-822-23215-3
- "To Remain Intact To Remain Moyamoya" QuickJapan vol.77 (2008, Ohta Publishing) ISBN 978-4-7783-1127-8
- "Thorough Feature: Complicated Summers2" QuickJapan vol.80 (2008, Ohta Publishing) ISBN 978-4-7783-1150-6
- Nikkei Veritas: Mariko Ooe no Moyamoya Talk (2009, Nikkei Publishing) ISBN 978-4-532-19519-9
- Noguchi-san, Uchū tte donna nioidesu ka? (by) Sōichi Noguchi-Mariko Ooe (2012, Asahi Shimbun Publishing) ISBN 978-4-02-250824-9
- Nikkei Veritas: Mariko Ooe no Moyamoya Talk 2 (2012, Nihon Keizai Shimbun Publisher) ISBN 978-4532196547

=== Newspaper columns ===
- Yomiuri Shimbun (evening edition entertainment side of Tokyo version) Nozomi wa Sora yori Takaku are (Jan–Jun 2008/monthly)

=== Magazines ===
The person herself only posts things in response to direct interviews.

- "Beauty 2000" Shūkan Golf Digest (Mar 2000, Golf Digest Company)
- "I Will Teach You the Truth of My 'Erotic Remark'!" Weekly Playboy (6 Sep 2005 Issue, Shueisha)
- "Megane Girl Declaration of Mariko Ooe!" Weekly Playboy (8 Nov 2005 Issue, Shueisha)
- "Pause Series Vol.148" The Record Geijutsu (Apr 2007 Issue, Ongaku No Tomo Sha (Introduced Kathleen Battle's Ombra mai fu))
- "I Heart TV Tokyo" TV Bros. (20 Apr 2008 Issue, Tokyo News Service)
- "Chinese language World People" Chūgokugo Journal (May 2008 Issue, Alc)
- "60 Minutes with 'That Woman'" The21 (Sep 2008 Issue, PHP Institute)
- "I Was Healed at 'Mariko no Heya'!" Beautiful Lady & Television (Dec 2009 Issue, Tokyo News Service)

== DVD ==
- Yakusoku Wanko (navigator) (7 Mar 2008)
- Complicated Summers2
  - Vol.1 (28 Mar 2008)
  - Vol.2&Vol.3 DVD Box (28 Mar 2008)
  - Vol.4&Vol.5 DVD Box 2 (1 Apr 2009)
  - Vol.6 (1 Apr 2009)
  - Vol.7&Vol.8 DVD Box 3 (24 Feb 2010)
  - Vol.9 (24 Feb 2010)
  - Vol.10&Vol.11 DVD Box 4 (2 Feb 2011)
  - Vol.12 (2 Feb 2011)
  - Vol.13&Vol.14 DVD Box 5 (1 Feb 2012)
  - Vol.15 (1 Feb 2012)
  - Vol.16&Vol.17 DVD Box 6 (6 Mar 2013)
  - Vol.18&Vol.19 DVD Box 7 (1 Feb 2013)
  - Ooe University Annual Graduation Memorial Special Kamakura & New York Director's Cut Edition (25 Sep 2013)
  - Vol.20&Vol.21 DVD Box 8 (4 Jun 2014)
  - Vol.24&Vol.25 DVD Box 9 (25 Feb 2015)
  - Vol.26&Vol.27 DVD Box 10 (23 Mar 2016)
  - Vol.28&Vol.29 DVD Box 11 (23 Mar 2016)
  - 10th Anniversary Members of the Assembly Special Director's Cut Edition (scheduled 29 November 2017)
- Joshi Ana Cooking: Oshiete! Ryōri no Ana to Tsubo
  1. (24 Sep 2008)
  2. (24 Sep 2008)
- J-Taro Sugisako to Mariko Ooe no Mōsō Renai (22 Apr 2009)
- Mariko no Heya (24 Feb 2010)

== Others ==
- ATP Award 2004 Award Ceremony (NHK: Yuriko Shimazu and co-chairperson 25 Jun 2004/NHK Satellite 2nd Television)
- Film 10 Promises to My Dog (Published 15 Mar 2008/As the announcer in the film)
- Berryz Kobo Seishun Bus Guide music video (appeared as the bus guide)
- Yakusoku Wanko (navigator)

== Episodes in regular shows ==
Both programmes that had appeared before she moved to the New York Branch.

=== Complicated Summers2 ===
She shows exquisite interaction of the trio state with the comedy duo Summers who have co-starred since the new announcer era, and showed short-circuit and one-off gags. Also, their reactions that did not decorate, such as getting drunk during the show, addicted to the point of laughter and getting caught were popular. In each location, they challenge various sports, playthings, recreation, things etc. without scaring, but there were many things that it was not possible to do better than "wanting to do". For example, she did not slide well on ice skating, and the pattern called "Doihī" (ドイヒー) and "Grandma" (おばあちゃん, Obāchan) was frequently broadcast later. In the meal scene, Mabo Tofu was a favourite and was well asked. By the way, her favourite Mabo Tofu is Sichuan Mabu Tofu of Jingdezhen in Yokohama Chinatown.

After having decided to transfer to the TV Tokyo New York branch office, graduation once with the broadcast at the end of March 2013. In the ending of 10 February the same year, her graduation was announced with tears toward viewers. In "3/3 Hour Special" on 7 April, the same year that became the last appearance before the graduation, after having performed the last location in Japan in Kamakura, she served as a move for herself. A picture was also taken to show office greetings at the New York branch office to which she was assigned. After that, there was a place of greeting in the privilege video of the DVD, and within the following Complicated Summers from the remarks there, there is a nickname of Villain Mariko Ooe (悪人・大江麻理子, Akunin Ōe Mariko). As soon as she returned home from New York, the Complicated Summers staff gave her a dinner party and watched me and now Assistant Eri Kano and Oe four shot talks were recorded on the DVD's first award disc.

=== Mugendai no Gimon ===
She was surrounded by naked Kanjani Eight members and performing cosplay of super mini skirts.

=== Shutsubotsu! Ado Machikku Tengoku ===
In addition to being noticed for self-introductions of mixed puns in opening, early cosplay and special skill (Kendama, etc.) are showcased at any time. When she visited Hakata with the first all-regional location of the same programme, she liked the local television series affiliated bureau, TVQ Kyushu Broadcasting mascot character "Moni Dai", appeared with a stuffed animal in the programme advertisement for the same station. In addition, she is actively providing guidance to the moderator Kinya Aikawa because she is from the local origin.

A necklace was sold at a vending machine of juice during the location of North Akabane of Complicated Summers2. She declared to wear it and appear on other programmes. She actually appeared on World Business Satellite or Shutsubotsu! Ado Machikku Tengoku wearing that necklace. After that, she wrote on World Business Satellite confesses that it was an accessory for a bag, not a necklace, with the DVD's secondary audio.

=== Do Tanki Tsumekomi Kyōiku! Gōwan! Coaching! ===
She participated as a student in "Karaoke Progressive Coaching", she performed a vocal training practice while conscious of the abdominal muscles, such as breathing while holding a plastic bottle and raising a chirping loudly while raising the chair.

=== Ongaku Baka ===
When it appeared in the name of "Maryves-chan", as the setting of "Maryves-chan" was a foreign narrator, she made a narration with so-called "foreigners speaking Japanese" with high speed and high tension, "Talk".

Preceded by Keiko Yashio	Tokyu Silvester Concert; Second generation female moderator; 2003–10	Succeeded by Tomoko Morimoto
Preceded by Keiko Yashio	Shutsubotsu! Ado Machikku Tengoku; Second generation secretary; April 2003 – March 2013	Succeeded by Sayaka Suguro
Preceded by –	Complicated Summers2; First Assistant; April 2007 – April 2013	Succeeded by Eri Kano
Preceded by Maoko Kotani	World Business Satellite; Fifth main caster; March 2014 –	Succeeded by –
