= Akiko Abe =

Japanese free announcer and actress (born 1978)

- 阿部 哲子
- Born: November 4, 1978 (age 47); Urayasu, Chiba Prefecture, Japan
- Other name: Akiko Nobuhiro (real name)
- Education: Chiba Prefectural Funabashi High School; Yokohama National University Faculty of Business
- Occupation: Announcer
- Years active: 2001–
- Agent: Our Songs Creative
- Known for: Bara-iro Dandy; Sukkiri!!
- Height: 1.65 m (5 ft 5 in)

Akiko Abe (阿部 哲子, Abe Akiko; born 4 November 1978) is a Japanese free announcer and actress. Her real name is Akiko Nobuhiro (延広 哲子, Nobuhiro Akiko). She was born in Urayasu, Chiba Prefecture, Japan.

== Filmography ==
=== TV series ===
==== As a Nippon TV announcer ====
Year	Title	Notes
	NNN News Dash	
	Suteki ni Goban	
	Ana-chan Gekijō	
	Shiodome Style!	Tuesday appearances
	@Supli!	
	Sports Max	
	Tele-tsuku	Sunday appearances
	Sponchu	Monday and Tuesday appearances
	Deka Sponchu	
	Gokujō! Harapeko Tabi Recipe	
2006	Sukkiri!!	
2006	2006 Winter Olympics	Local caster
2006	Kuitan Special: in Hong Kong	
	Shōten	

==== As a free announcer ====
Year	Title	Role	Network	Notes
2011	Nihon Dokusen! 2010 Cannes Film Festival Jushō-shiki Live		Movie Plus	Host
2011	Ouran High School Host Club	Secretary	TBS	Episodes 4 to 8
2012	2012 Summer Paralympics		BS SK-Per, SK-Chan	Caster
2012	Nippon Dandy		Tokyo MX	MC on Thursdays
2013	Shūmatsu Metro Politician		Tokyo MX	Friday appearances
2014	Bara-iro Dandy		Tokyo MX	MC, later assistant on Thursdays
2014	Shūkan Literacy		Tokyo MX	Saturday appearances

=== Radio ===
Year	Title	Network	Notes
2010	Tokyo Morning Radio	J-Wave	Guest
2010	Future Scape	FM Yokohama	Personality
2011	Synapse	Tokyo FM	"Yo-mi-ki-ka-se"
2012	NTT Facilities Presents Smart Academy	Tokyo FM	
2012	Beautiful Sunday	FM Nack 5	Personality
2014	Hikaru Ijūin no Shūmatsu Tsutaya ni Itte Kore Kariyou!	TBS Radio	4th assistant
2015	Tamamusubi	TBS Radio	Personality
2015	Hiroshi Ikushima no Ohayō Teishoku	TBS Radio	Personality
2015	Hiroshi Ikushima no Ohayō Itchokusen	TBS Radio	Personality
2016	Sunday Flickers	JFNC	5th assistant

=== Stage ===
Year	Title	Role
2004	Susume! Nihongo Keibitai	
2005	Dr. TV: Shiodome TV Kinkyū Kyūmei-shitsu	
2010	Cyrano de Bergerac	Roxanne

=== Events ===
Year	Title	Notes
2011	Japan Girls Meeting	MC

=== Magazines ===
Year	Title	Notes
2014	Chanto	Main model and essay writer, bimonthly
