= Atsuko Kurusu =

Japanese actress (born 1978)

- 来栖 あつこ
- Born: January 26, 1978 (age 48); Kitaibaraki, Ibaraki Prefecture, Japan
- Occupation: Actress
- Years active: 1996–present

Atsuko Kurusu (来栖 あつこ, Kurusu Atsuko; January 26, 1978) is a Japanese actress. She came to prominence for starring in the 1996–97 Super Sentai franchise, Gekisou Sentai Carranger.

She graduated from Tokiwa Girls High School in Kobe.

== Filmography ==
=== TV series ===
Year	Title	Role	Network	Other notes
1996	Gekisou Sentai Carranger	Yoko Yagami / Pink Racer	TV Asahi	
1996	Hoshi no Kinka		NTV	
2000	Friends		TBS	
2004	Eko Eko Azarak	Hiromi Yamanaka	TV Tokyo	
2008	Tokyo Girl	Yoko	BS-TBS	Episodes 4 and 5
2011	Inu o Kau to Iu Koto	Natsumi Eto	TV Asahi	
