= Yuka Motohashi =

Japanese actress (1978–2024)

- 本橋 由香
- Born: February 23, 1978; Tokyo, Japan
- Died: May 31, 2024 (aged 46)
- Cause of death: Cancer
- Occupation: Actress
- Years active: 1993–2023

Yuka Motohashi (本橋 由香, Motohashi Yuka; February 23, 1978 – May 31, 2024) was a Japanese actress who was affiliated with Office Matsuda. She came to prominence for starring in the 1996–97 Super Sentai franchise, Gekisou Sentai Carranger.

== Life and career ==
Motohashi was born on February 23, 1978. She graduated from Shakujii High School in Tokyo.

On August 11, 2021, she was diagnosed with a cancer of unknown primary origin. Her last role was in Avataro Sentai Donbrothers in 2023. She died from that cancer on May 31, 2024. She was 46.

== Filmography ==
=== Television series ===
Year	Title	Role	Network	Other notes
1994	Yagami-kun no Katei no Jijō		TV Asahi	
1996-97	Gekisou Sentai Carranger	Natsumi Shinohara / Yellow Racer	TV Asahi	
2007	Aibō	Miyuki Iketani	TV Asahi	Season 5, Episode 13
2009	Akai Ito	Nurse of medical center	Fuji TV	
2023	Avataro Sentai Donbrothers	Sonona	TV Asahi	Episode 49 and 50; Last Role

=== Films ===
Year	Title	Role	Other notes
2010	Kamen Rider × Kamen Rider OOO & W Featuring Skull: Movie War Core	Naomi	
