= Masahiro Abe =

Japanese baseball player and coach (born 1978)

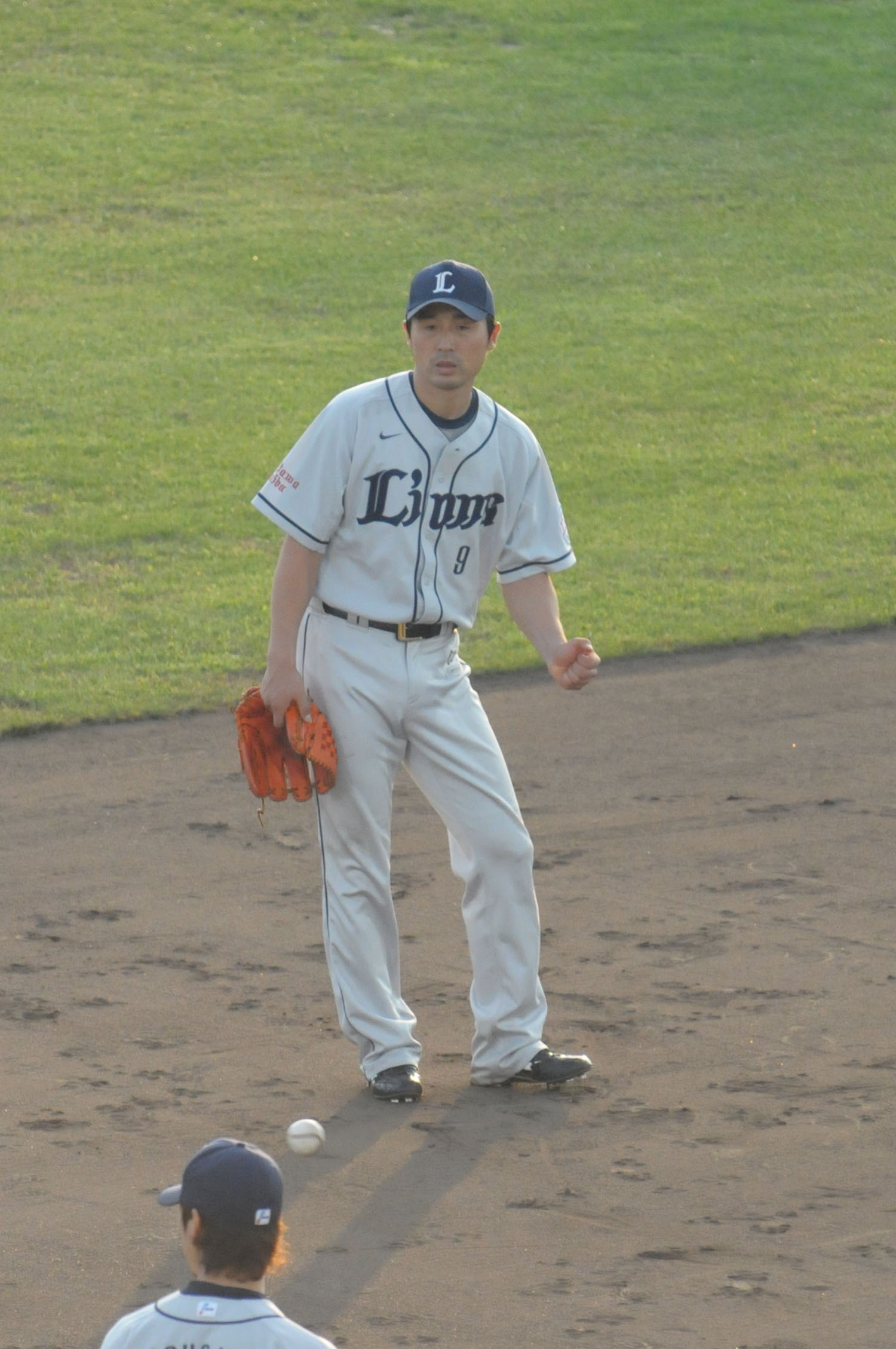
- Abe with the Saitama Seibu Lions
- Infielder / Coach
- Born: May 12, 1978 (age 48); Kawasaki, Kanagawa, Japan
- Batted: Right Threw: Right

NPB debut
- March 24, 2001, for the Osaka Kintetsu Buffaloes

Last NPB appearance
- June 14, 2012, for the Saitama Seibu Lions

NPB statistics
- Batting average: .248
- Home runs: 26
- Runs batted in: 250
- Stats at Baseball Reference

Teams
- As player: Osaka Kintetsu Buffaloes (2001–2004); Orix Buffaloes (2005–2010); Saitama Seibu Lions (2010–2012); As coach: Saitama Seibu Lions (2015–2024)

Masahiro Abe (阿部 真宏, Abe Masahiro; born May 12, 1978 in Kawasaki, Kanagawa, Japan) is a former Nippon Professional Baseball player.
