= Takeharu Kato =

Japanese baseball player

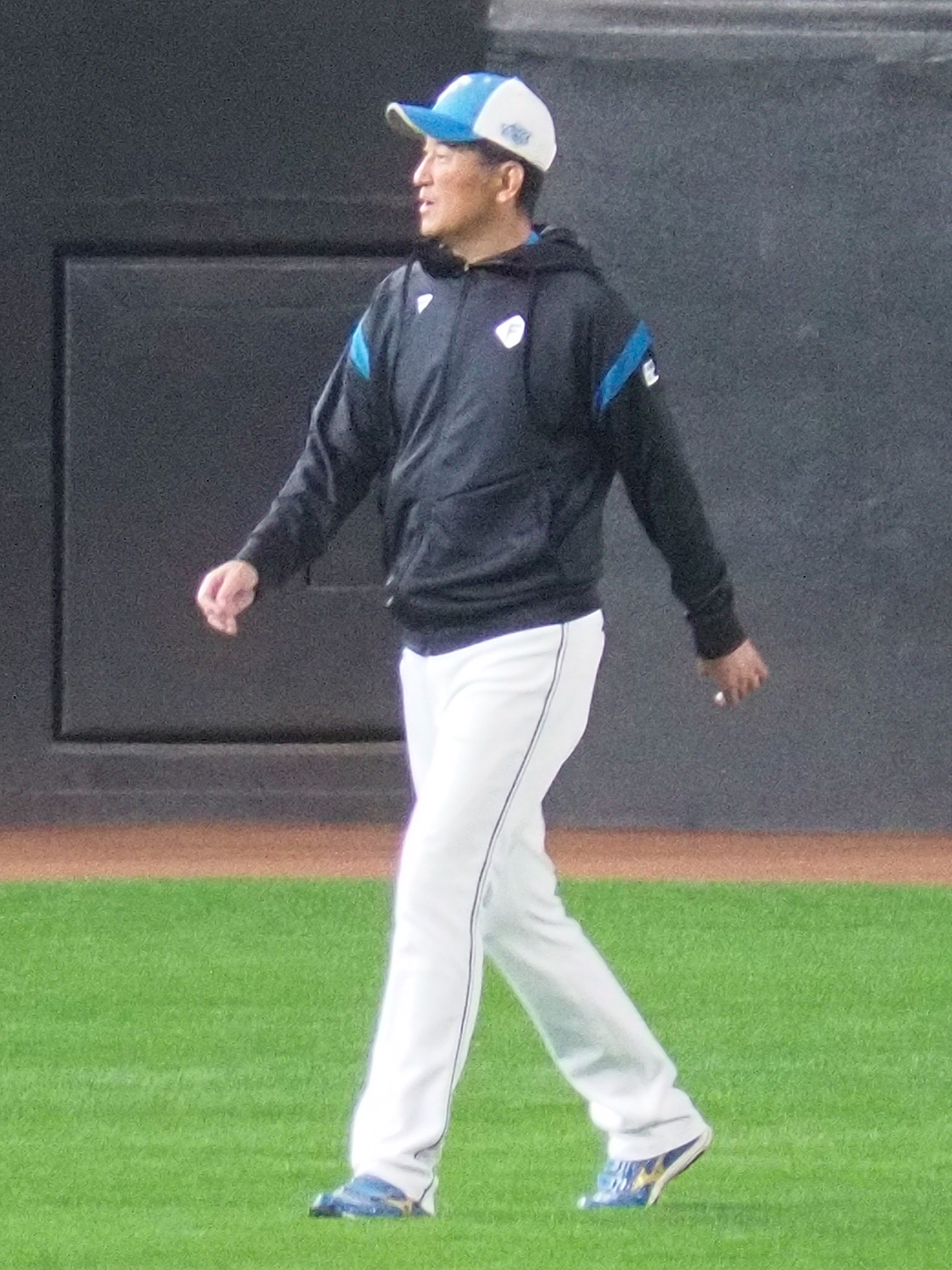

Hokkaido Nippon Ham Fighters – No. 82
- Pitcher / Coach
- Born: March 24, 1978 (age 47)
- Batted: Right Threw: Right

NPB debut
- May 22, 2003, for the Yokohama BayStars

Last appearance
- August 19, 2010, for the Nippon-Ham Fighters

NPB statistics (through 2011)
- Win–loss record: 30-28
- ERA: 3.61
- Strikeouts: 443
- Saves: 9
- Holds: 48

Teams
- As player: Yokohama BayStars (2003–2009); Hokkaido Nippon-Ham Fighters (2010–2011); As coach: Nippon-Ham Fighters/Hokkaido Nippon-Ham Fighters (2012–2014, 2018–present)

Career highlights and awards
- 1× Central League Most Valuable Setup Pitcher (2006)

Takeharu Kato (加藤 武治, Katō Takeharu; born March 24, 1978 in Tendō, Yamagata) is a retired Japanese professional pitcher.
