= Osamu Hamanaka =

Japanese baseball player (born 1978)

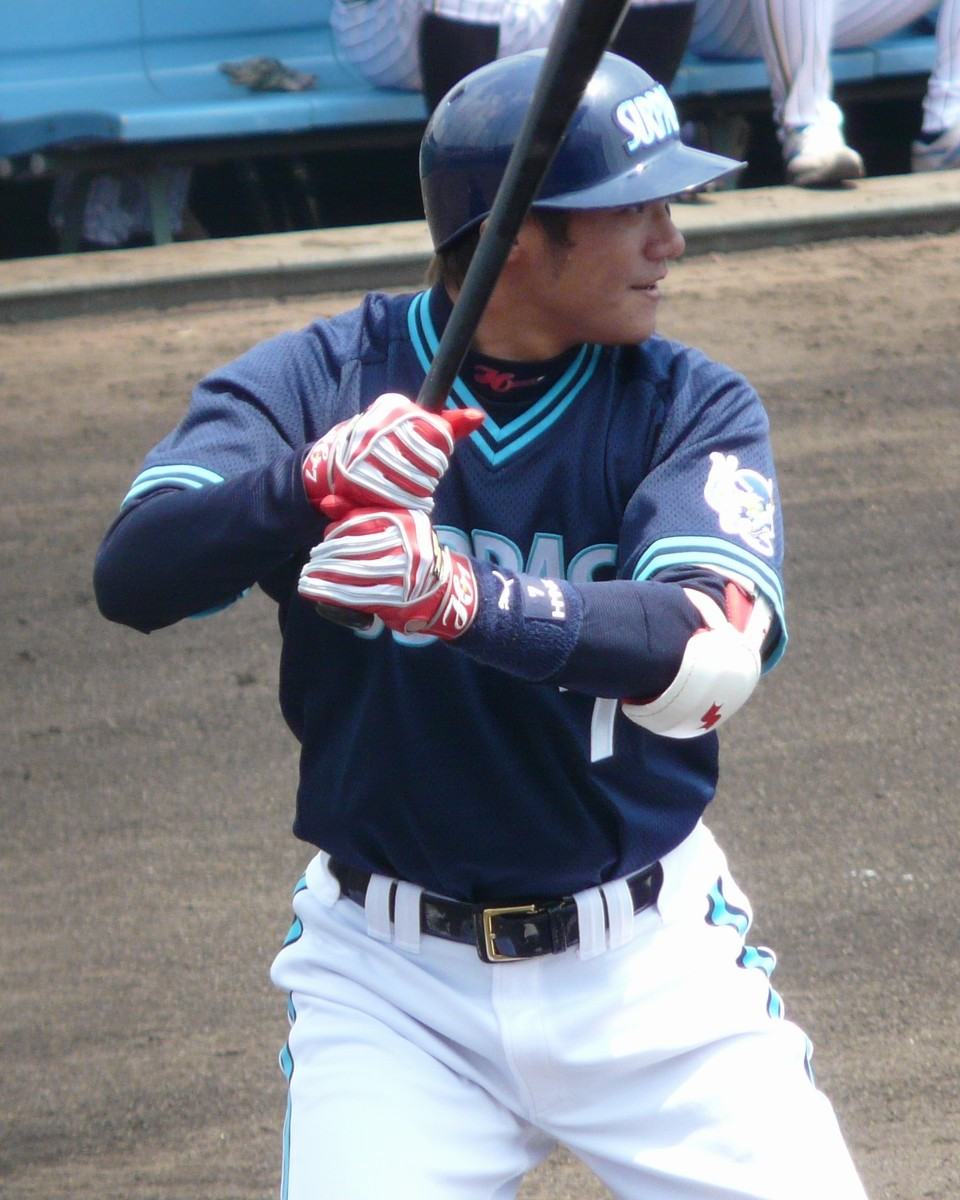
- Outfielder / Batting Coach
- Born: July 9, 1978 (age 47)
- Batted: Right Threw: Right

NPB debut
- September 20, 1997, for the Hanshin Tigers

Last NPB appearance
- April 23, 2011, for the Tokyo Yakult Swallows

NPB statistics
- Hits: 580
- Average: .268
- Home Runs: 85
- RBI: 311

Teams
- As player: Hanshin Tigers (1997–2007); Orix Buffaloes (2008–2010); Tokyo Yakult Swallows (2011); As coach: Hanshin Tigers (2015–2019)

Osamu Hamanaka (濱中 治, born July 9, 1978, in Tanabe, Wakayama) is a former Japanese professional baseball player. Drafted by the Hanshin Tigers in Japan's Nippon Professional Baseball in 1996, Hamanaka spent 11 years with the club from 1997 to 2007. Following his time with Hanshin, Hamanaka spent three seasons with the Orix Buffaloes from 2008 to 2010 and one season with the Tokyo Yakult Swallows in 2011. In November 2014 it was announced that Hamanaka had signed a contract to return to Hanshin as a batting coach for the farm team.
