= Takashi Suzuki (politician) =

Japanese politician

- 鈴木 隆
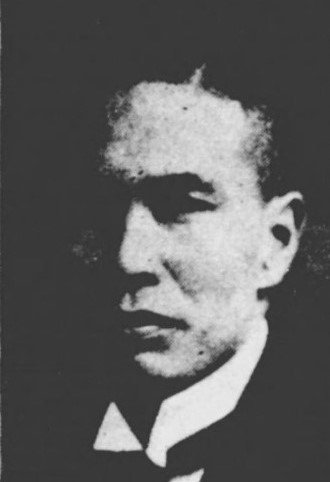
- Portrait of Takashi Suzuki

Member of the House of Representatives
- In office 10 May 1920 – 20 April 1933
- Preceded by: Constituency established
- Succeeded by: Rokurō Shinohara
- Constituency: Chiba 8th (1920–1928); Chiba 1st (1928–1933)

Personal details
- Born: 13 January 1882 Chiba Prefecture, Japan
- Died: 30 March 1978 (aged 96)
- Party: Rikken Seiyūkai
- Education: Tokyo Prefectural Normal School

Takashi Suzuki (鈴木 隆, Suzuki Takashi; 1882 - 1978) was a Japanese speculator-turned politician.

== Early life ==
Born to a peasant family in Chiba Prefecture, Suzuki became an elementary school teacher after graduating from a normal school.

His uncle's success in the booming stock market during the Russo-Japanese War interested him in equity investment.

== Business career ==
Suzuki left teaching to become a market speculator at age 28.

In the market crash of 1920, he earned approximately three million yen by short-selling stocks, when the average monthly salary for college graduates was no more than forty yen.

== Political career ==
Suzuki successfully ran for the Lower House election in 1920. Backed by the Rikken Seiyūkai, he was reelected for five consecutive terms.
