= Kensaku Kishida =

Japanese actor and entertainer (born 1978)

Kensaku Kishida 岸田 健作
- Born: November 8, 1978 (age 46); Adachi, Tokyo, Japan
- Occupation(s): Actor, entertainer
- Years active: 1997–present
- Labels: GF Enterprise
- Website: Official website

Kensaku Kishida (岸田 健作, Kishida Kensaku, born November 8, 1978, in Adachi, Tokyo, Japan) is a Japanese actor and entertainer who also works as a vocalist in his solo project, Ash Berry. He graduated from Tokyo Metropolitan Kōhoku High School. He has an exclusive contract with GF Enterprise.

== Biography ==
Kishida passed an audition in March 1997, and appeared in Waratte Iitomo! until March 2000.

He also appeared in variety shows such as London Hearts and Back Up!

As an actor, Kishida made regular appearances in the drama series O Mizu no Hanamichi and Sutā no Koi.

== Filmography ==
=== TV series ===
Year	Title	Network	Notes	Ref.
2010	Niko Nama Kōshiki Channel Kensaku Kishida no Waratte Injan!!	Nico-sei Official Channel		
2012	Kensaku Kishida no G-men Paradise	Tokyo MX		
2013	Beat	Tokyo MX		

=== Past performances ===
Variety series

Year	Title	Network	Notes
	London Hearts	TV Asahi	
1997	Waratte Iitomo!	Fuji TV	
2012	Bakuhō! The Friday	TBS	
2013	Kudamaki Hachibee	TV Tokyo	
2013	Shigoto Hakken-den	NHK G	

Dramas

Year	Title	Role	Network	Notes
1998	Hashire Kōmuin		Fuji TV	
1999	O Mizu no Hanamichi		Fuji TV	
2000	Shinjuku Bōsō Kyūkyū-tai		NTV	
2001	Watashi o Ryokan ni Tsurete tte	Norio Kuronuma	Fuji TV	
2001	Sutā no Koi	Mitsuru Amamiya	Fuji TV	
2007	Parsley	Yuichi Sato	UHF	

Films

Year	Title	Role	Notes	Ref.
2011	Cool Blue	Genji	Lead role	
2014	Blue/Face Returns	Natsuhiko Yamamoto	Lead role	
