= 1935 in Japan =

- Decades: 1910s; 1920s; 1930s; 1940s; 1950s
- See also: Other events of 1935; History of Japan; Timeline; Years

Events from the year 1935 in Japan.

== Incumbents ==
- Emperor: Hirohito
- Prime Minister: Keisuke Okada

=== Governors ===
- Aichi Prefecture: Eitaro Shinohara
- Akita Prefecture: Takabe Rokuzo
- Aomori Prefecture: Mitsumasa Kobayashi
- Ehime Prefecture: Jiro Ichinohe (until 15 January); Jiro Kan Oba (starting 15 January)
- Fukui Prefecture: Shinsuke Kondo
- Fukushima Prefecture: Ito Takehiko
- Gifu Prefecture:
  - until 15 January: Umekichi Miyawaki
  - 15 January-31 May: Chi Sakamato
  - starting 31 May: Chiaki Saka
- Gunma Prefecture: Masao Kanazawa (until 15 January); Seikichi Kimishima (starting 15 June)
- Hiroshima Prefecture: Michio Yuzawa (until 15 January); Keiichi Suzuki (starting 15 January)
- Ibaraki Prefecture: Abe Kashichi (until 15 January); Ando Kyoushirou (starting 15 January)
- Iwate Prefecture: Hidehiko Ishiguro
- Kagawa Prefecture: Yoshisuke Kinoshita (until 15 June); Megumi Fujimo (starting 15 June)
- Kumamoto Prefecture: Keiichi Suzuki (until 15 January); Sekiya Nobuyuke (starting 15 January)
- Kochi Prefecture: Yozora Takehamu (until 16 October); Kobayashi Mitsumasa (starting 16 October)
- Kyoto Prefecture: Saito Munenori (until January); Shintaro Suzuki (starting January)
- Mie Prefecture: Saburo Hayakawa (until 23 June); Aijiro Tomita (starting 23 June)
- Miyagi Prefecture: Kiyoshi Nakarai (until 28 June); Jiro Ino (starting 28 June)
- Miyazaki Prefecture: Seikuchi Kimishima (until 15 January); Seiya Mishima (starting 15 January)
- Nagano Prefecture: Okoda Shuzo (until 15 January); Seiichi Omora (starting 15 January)
- Niigata Prefecture: Chiba Ryo (until 15 June); Miyawaki Umekichi (starting 15 June)
- Okinawa Prefecture: Jiro Ino (until 28 June); Hisashi Kurashige (starting 28 June)
- Osaka Prefecture: Shinobu Agata (until month unknown)
- Saga Prefecture: Shizuo Furukawa
- Saitama Prefecture: Kazume Iinuma (until 25 May); Saito Juri (starting 25 May)
- Shiname Prefecture: Masaki Fukumura
- Tochigi Prefecture: Gunzo Kayaba
- Tokyo: Masayasu Kouksaka (until 15 January); Sukenari Yokoya (starting 15 January)
- Toyama Prefecture: Saito Itsuki (until 25 May); Ginjiro Toki (starting 25 May)
- Yamagata Prefecture: Taro Kanamori

== Events ==
- January 8 – Battle of Khalkhyn Temple
- February 11 – Tosoh was founded in Tokuyama (now Shunan) Yamaguchi Prefecture, as predecessor name was Toyo Soda.
- June – North Chahar Incident
- June 27 – Chin-Doihara Agreement
- July 5 – establishment of Ōtone Prefectural Natural Park.
- August 9 – establishment of Mineokasankei Prefectural Natural Park, Kujūkuri Prefectural Natural Park, Takagoyama Prefectural Natural Park and Yōrō Keikoku Okukiyosumi Prefectural Natural Park.
- September 27 – opening of Tōbu-Izumi Station.
- October 20 – opening of Musahiro-Tokiwa Station (now Tokiwadai Station (Tokyo)).
- Unknown date – Yakult founded in Fukuoka City.
- Establishment of Naoki Prize and Akutagawa Prize.

== Films ==
- January 20 – Orizuru Osen
- November 21 – An Inn in Tokyo
- date unknown – Kodakara Sodo

== Births ==
- January 2 – Sumiko Iwao, psychologist and educator (d. 2018)
- January 4 – Toru Terasawa, runner (d. 2025)
- January 31 – Kenzaburō Ōe, Nobel Prize-winning Japanese writer (d. 2023)
- February 2 – Junko Hori, Japanese voice actress (d. 2024)
- February 6 – Yoshiomi Tamai, founder of Ashinaga (d. 2025)
- February 22 – Hisako Kyōda, Japanese voice actress
- March 17 – Seiji Yokoyama, musician (d. 2017)
- March 22 – Yūtokutaishi Akiyama, engraver and photographer (d. 2020)
- April 9 – Motomu Kiyokawa, actor and voice actor (d. 2022)
- April 17 – Masanori Hata, zoologist, essayist, and filmmaker (d. 2023)
- May 10 – Ikujiro Nonaka, organisational theorist (d. 2025)
- May 15 – Akihiro Miwa, singer, actor, author and drag queen (d. 2026)
- June 2 – Keiko Hanagata, voice actress (d. 2015)
- June 10 – Yoshihiro Tatsumi, Japanese manga artist (d. 2015)
- June 26 – Sumiko Shirakawa, voice actress (body discovered. 2015)
- June 29 – Katsuya Nomura, baseball player and manager (d. 2020)
- July 12 – Satoshi Ōmura, Nobel Prize-winning biochemist
- July 23 – Yukiji Asaoka, singer and actress (d. 2018)
- August 9 – Kazuko Yoshiyuki, actress, voice actress, and essayist (d. 2025)
- August 24 – Tsutomu Hata, 51st Prime Minister of Japan (d. 2017)
- September 1 – Seiji Ozawa, composer and conductor (d. 2024)
- September 14 – Fujio Akatsuka, Japanese cartoonist (d. 2008)
- September 24 – Yuzuru Fujimoto, voice actor (d. 2019)
- September 29 – Rieko Nakagawa, Japanese writer and lyricist (d. 2024)
- October 2 – Noriko Ohara, actress, voice actress and narrator (d. 2024)
- October 4 – Takao Iwami, political pundit (d. 2014)
- October 8 – Yoshikazu Minami, photographer
- October 9 – Teruyoshi Nakano, special effects director (d. 2022)
- October 10 – Yumiko Kurahashi, writer (d. 2005)
- October 15 – Yukio Ninagawa, theater director (d. 2016)
- October 29 – Isao Takahata, film director, screenwriter and producer (d. 2018)
- November 15 – Kaneta Kimotsuki, voice actor (d. 2016)
- November 17 – Masatoshi Sakai, Japanese record producer (d. 2021)
- November 28 – Prince Masahito of Hitachi
- December 10 – Shūji Terayama, poet, writer, film director, and photographer (d. 1983)
- December 19 – Taizo Nishimuro, businessman (d. 2017)
- date unknown
  - Keizaburo Tejima, artist and author

== Deaths ==
- January 17 – Ishikawa Chiyomatsu, biologist, zoologist, and ichthyologist (b. 1861)
- February 28 – Tsubouchi Shōyō, author, critic and educator (b. 1859)
- March 8 – Hachikō, a faithful Akita, on the spot where he had awaited his dead owner for nine years
- March 20 – Gyoshū Hayami, painter (b. 1894)
- August 12 – Tetsuzan Nagata, general (b. 1884)

== See also ==
- 1935 in Japanese football
- List of Japanese films of the 1930s
