= 1938 in Japan =

- Decades: 1910s; 1920s; 1930s; 1940s; 1950s
- See also: Other events of 1938; History of Japan • Timeline • Years

Events in the year 1938 in Japan. It corresponds to Shōwa 13 (昭和13年) in the Japanese calendar.

== Incumbents ==
- Emperor: Hirohito
- Prime Minister: Fumimaro Konoe

=== Governors ===
- Aichi Prefecture: Kotaro Tanaka
- Akita Prefecture: Kiyoshi Honma (until 24 June); Kaoru Sasaki (starting 24 June)
- Aomori Prefecture: Masanori Ogawa (until 1 March); Shizuo Furukawa (starting 1 March)
- Ehime Prefecture: Shizuo Furukawa (until 15 July); Yoshio Mochinaga (starting 15 July)
- Fukui Prefecture: Nakano Yoshiro (until 17 April); Kiyoshi Kimura (starting 17 April)
- Fukuoka Prefecture: Kyuichi Komada (starting 1939)
- Fukushima Prefecture: Seikichi Kimishima (until 5 September); Seikichi Hashimoto (starting 5 September)
- Gifu Prefecture: Miyano Shozo
- Gunma Prefecture: Shozo Tsuchiya
- Hiroshima Prefecture: Aijiro Tomita (until 9 November); Ichisho Inuma (starting 9 November)
- Ibaraki Prefecture: Nobuo Hayashi (until 11 January); Shigeru Hamaza (starting 11 January)
- Ishikawa Prefecture: Masasuke Kodama (until 1938); Shunsuke Kondo (starting 1938)
- Iwate Prefecture: Chiyoji Yukizawa
- Kagawa Prefecture: Nagatoshi Fujioka
- Kumamoto Prefecture: Fujioka Nagawa
- Kochi Prefecture: Kobayashi Mitsumasa
- Kyoto Prefecture: Keiichi Suzuki
- Mie Prefecture: Masatoshi Sato
- Miyagi Prefecture: Yoshio Kikuyama
- Miyazaki Prefecture: Katsuroku Aikawa
- Nagasaki Prefecture: Jitsuzo Kawanishi
- Nagano Prefecture:
  - until 11 January: Shinsuke Kondo
  - 11 January-23 December: Seiichi Omora
  - starting 23 December: Tomita Kenji
- Niigata Prefecture: Sekiya Nobuyuki (until 24 June); Yasujiro Nakamura (starting 24 June)
- Okayama Prefecture: Hisashi Kurashige (until 24 June); Fusataro Fuchigami (starting 24 June)
- Okinawa Prefecture: Hisashi Kurashige (until 24 June); Fusataro Fuchigami (starting 24 June)
- Saga Prefecture: Tomoichi Koyama
- Saitama Prefecture: Jitsuzo Kawanishi (until 22 April); Toki Ginjiro (starting 22 April)
- Shiname Prefecture: ...
- Tochigi Prefecture: Adachi Shuuritsu
- Tokyo: Tetsuji Kan (until 24 June); Okada Shuzo (starting 24 June)
- Toyama Prefecture: Ginjiro Toki (until 18 April); Kenzo Yano (starting 18 April)
- Yamagata Prefecture: Takei Yoshitsugu

== Events ==
- January – Taihoku Air Strike
- January–June – Battle of Northern and Eastern Henan
- January 1
  - According to Japanese government official report, a roof building suddenly collapsed due snow in Kugaiza Cinema House, Tokamachi, Niigata Prefecture, killing 69 people and injuring 92.
  - Pioneer Corporation was founded, as predecessor name was Fukuin Electronics Manufacturing.
- January 6 – Construction brand, Kumagai Gumi (熊谷組) has founded in Fukui City.
- March 24 – National Mobilization Law
- March 24-April 7 – Battle of Taierzhuang
- March 24-May 1 – Battle of Xuzhou
- May – Battle of Lanfeng
- May 10–12 – Amoy Operation
- May 21 – Tsuyama massacre
- June 8 – Tokyo Film Production, as predecessor of Toei was founded.
- June 11-October 27 – Battle of Wuhan
- July 1 – Battle of Xinfeng
- July 5 – A heavy torrential rain with debris flow hit around Mount Rokko area, Hyogo Prefecture, official death number toll was 715 persons, according to Japanese government confirmed report.
- July 29-August 11 – Battle of Lake Khasan
- August 24 – According to Japanese government official confirmed report, two plane collided, following to crash and caught fire on factory in Omori region (now Ota, Tokyo), official death toll was 70, with 60 persons were wounded.
- October 1–11 – Battle of Wanjialing
- October–December – Canton Operation
- December 27 – 1938 Unazuki avalanche, 84 persons were fatalities in Toyama Prefecture, according to Japanese government official confirmed report.

== Births ==
- January 13 – Nachi Nozawa, Japanese voice actor (d. 2010)
- January 14 – Morihiro Hosokawa, politician and 50th Prime Minister of Japan
- January 15 – Manami Fuji, actress, essayist, and haiku poet
- January 23 – Giant Baba, professional wrestler (d. 1999)
- January 25
  - Shotaro Ishinomori, author, manga artist, Father of "Henshin heroes" (d. 1998)
  - Leiji Matsumoto, mango artist judoka (d. 2023)
- January 29 – Shuji Tsurumi, Olympic gymnast
- February 4 – Isao Inokuma, judoka (d. 2001)
- March 11 – Tatsuo Umemiya, actor, tarento, and businessman (d. 2019)
- March 30 – Chiyoko Shimakura, enka singer (d. 2013)
- March 31 – Michiko Nomura, actress and voice actress
- April 22 – Issey Miyake, fashion designer
- June 28 – Yōko Sano, writer and illustrator (d. 2010)
- July 9 – Tura Satana, Japanese-born American actress (d. 2011)
- September 3 – Ryōji Noyori, chemist, Nobel Prize laureate
- September 8 – Kenichi Horie, adventurer
- November 22 – Niro Shimada, Chief Justice of the Supreme Court of Japan
- October 31 – Kei Tomiyama, actor, voice actor and narrator (d. 1995)
- November 30 – Makio Inoue, actor and voice actor (d. 2019)
- December 16 – Liv Ullmann, Norwegian actress

== Deaths ==
- February 2 – Momosuke Fukuzawa, businessman (b. 1868)
- May 4 – Kanō Jigorō, educator and founder of Judo (b. 1860)
- July 25 – Kōsaku Hamada, academic, archaeologist, author and President of Kyoto University (b. 1881)
- September 17 – Sadao Yamanaka, film director and screenwriter (b. 1909)
- October 5 – Chieko Takamura, artist (b. 1886)
- October 19 – Prince Fushimi Hiroyoshi (b. 1897)
- November 20 – Enzo Matsunaga, author (b. 1895)

== See also ==
- List of Japanese films of the 1930s
