= 1940 in Japan =

- Decades: 1920s; 1930s; 1940s; 1950s; 1960s
- See also: Other events of 1940; History of Japan • Timeline • Years

Events in the year 1940 in Japan. It corresponds to Shōwa 15 (昭和15年) in the Japanese calendar.

== Incumbents ==
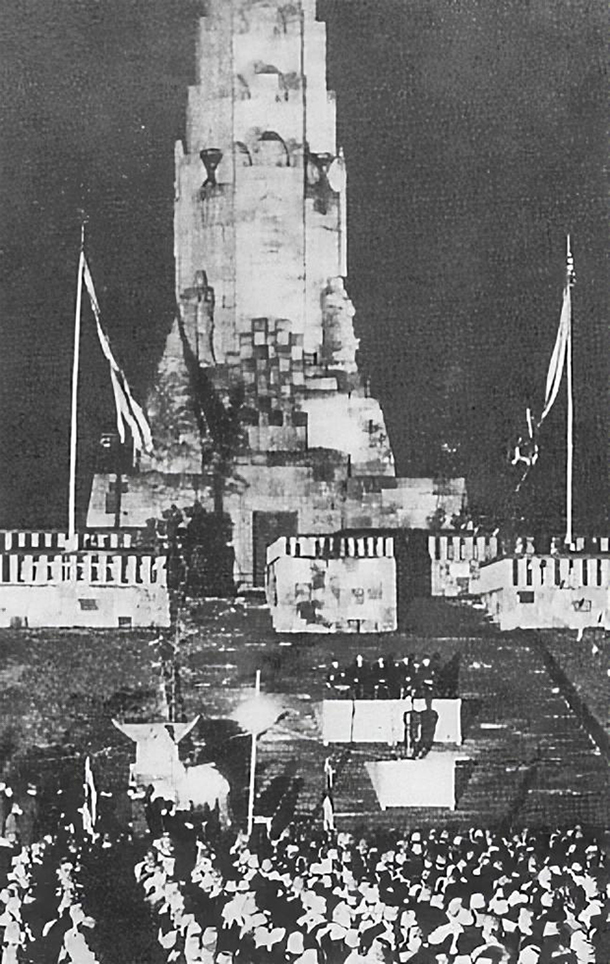
Founding Ceremony of the Hakko-Ichiu Monument on April 3, 1940. It had Prince Chichibu's calligraphy of Hakkō ichiu, carved on its front side.

- Emperor: Hirohito
- Prime Minister:
  - Nobuyuki Abe, until January 16,
  - Mitsumasa Yonai, until July 22,
  - Fumimaro Konoe, from July 22

=== Governors ===
- Aichi Prefecture: Kotaro Tanaka (until 9 April); Kodama Kyuichi (starting 9 April)
- Akita Prefecture: Yukio Tomeoka (until 24 July); Fumi (starting 24 July)
- Aomori Prefecture: Noburo Suzuki (until 24 July); Seiichi Ueda (starting 24 July)
- Ehime Prefecture: Yoshio Mochinaga (until 24 July); Susumu Nakamura Noriyuki (starting 24 July)
- Fukui Prefecture: Kiyoshi Kimura (until 14 April); Kubota (starting 14 April)
- Fukuoka Prefecture: Kyuichi Kodama
- Fukushima Prefecture: Seikichi Hashimoto (until 24 December); Sumio Hisakawa (starting 24 December)
- Gifu Prefecture: Miyano Shozo
- Gunma Prefecture: Kumano Ei (until 20 October); Susukida Yoshitomo (starting 20 October)
- Hiroshima Prefecture: Katsuroku Aikawa
- Ibaraki Prefecture: Tokitsugi Yoshinaga
- Ishikawa Prefecture: Narita Ichiro (until month unknown)
- Iwate Prefecture: Chiyoji Yukizawa (until 10 April); Yoshifumi Yamauchi (starting 10 April)
- Kagawa Prefecture: Nagatoshi Fujioka (until 9 April); Osamu Eianhyaku (starting 9 April)
- Kanagawa Prefecture: Ichisho Inuma then Mitsuma Matsumura
- Kumamoto Prefecture: Tomoichi Koyama
- Kochi Prefecture: Kondo Shunsuke (until 9 April); Chioji Yukisawa (starting 9 April)
- Kyoto Prefecture: Tota Akamatsuko (until April); Jitsuzo Kawanishi (starting April)
- Mie Prefecture: Masatoshi Sato (until 4 April); Yoshiro Nakano (starting 4 April)
- Miyagi Prefecture: Ryosaku Shimizu (until 4 April); Nobuo Hayashin (starting 4 April)
- Miyazaki Prefecture: Jitsuzo Kawanishi (until month unknown)
- Nagano Prefecture: Tomita Kenji (until 22 July); Nagoya Osamu (starting 22 July)
- Nagasaki Prefecture: Jitsuzo Kawanishi
- Niigata Prefecture: Seikichi Kimishima (until 9 April); Yasui Seiichiro (starting 9 April)
- Okinawa Prefecture: Fusataro Fuchigami
- Saga Prefecture: Kato (until 9 April); Masaki (starting 9 April)
- Saitama Prefecture: Toki Ginjiro
- Shiname Prefecture: Kiyoo Ebe (until 23 December); Yasuo Otsubo (starting 23 December)
- Tochigi Prefecture: Adachi Shuuritsu (until 8 April); Saburo Yamagata (starting 8 April)
- Tokyo: Okada Shuzo
- Toyama Prefecture: Kenzo Yano
- Yamagata Prefecture: Ishiguro Takeshige (until 24 August); Hee Yamauchi (starting 24 August)

== Films ==
- Kaze no Matasaburo
- Totsugu hi made

== Events ==
- Throughout the entire year - Celebration of year 2600 in Japanese imperial year
- January 15 – A large fire destroys much of Shizuoka city center.
- January 29 – According to Japanese government official confirmed report, a three-passenger locomotive commuter train derail and caught fire nearby Ajikawaguchi Station, Osaka, resulting to 189 person (181 were instantly, 8 were hospital) were death and 69 persons injures.
- March 16–April 3 – Battle of Wuyuan
- May 1–June 18 – Battle of Zaoyang-Yichang
- September 22–26 – Japanese invasion of French Indochina
- November 25–30 – Central Hubei Operation

== Births ==
- January 1 – Ippei Kuri, manga artist and entrepreneur (d. 2023)
- January 2 – Masahiko Tsugawa, actor (d. 2018)
- February 7 – Toshihide Maskawa, Nobel Prize-winning physicist (d. 2021)
- February 11 – Kinryuu Arimoto, voice actor (d. 2019)
- May 13 – Kōkichi Tsuburaya, marathoner (d. 1968)
- May 25 – Nobuyoshi Araki, photographer and artist
- June 3 – Koichi Kishi, politician (d. 2017)
- July 2 – Ruriko Asaoka, actress
- July 19 – Hanako, Princess Hitachi, wife of Masahito, Prince Hitachi and the sister-in-law of Emperor Emeritus Akihito
- August 20 – Gisaburō Sugii, anime director and Nihonga artist
- September 20 – Tarō Asō, 59th Prime Minister of Japan
- October 30 – Hidetoshi Nagasawa, sculptor and architect (d. 2018)
- December 4 – Fumio Kyūma, politician

== Deaths ==
- January 1 – Fusajiro Yamauchi, entrepreneur (b. 1859)
- March 8 – Princess Masako Takeda, sixth daughter of Emperor Meiji (b. 1888)
- May 11 – Chujiro Hayashi, Reiki practitioner (b. 1880)
- June 5 – Tokugawa Iesato, politician (b. 1863)
- September 4 – Prince Nagahisa Kitashirakawa, career army officer (b. 1910)
- October 6 – Michitarō Komatsubara, general (b. 1885)
- November 20 – Hideo Oguma, poet (b. 1901)
- November 24 – Saionji Kinmochi, politician, statesman and Prime Minister of Japan (b. 1849)

== See also ==
- List of Japanese films of the 1940s
