= 1939 in Japan =

- Decades: 1910s; 1920s; 1930s; 1940s; 1950s
- See also: Other events of 1939; History of Japan • Timeline • Years

Events in the year 1939 in Japan. It corresponds to Shōwa 14 (昭和14年) in the Japanese calendar.

== Incumbents ==
- Emperor: Hirohito
- Prime Minister:
  - Fumimaro Konoe: until January 5
  - Kiichirō Hiranuma: 5 January – 30 August
  - Nobuyuki Abe: from 30 August

=== Governors ===
- Aichi Prefecture: Kotaro Tanaka
- Akita Prefecture: Kaoru Sasaki (until 11 January); Yukio Tomeoka (starting 11 January)
- Aomori Prefecture: Masanori Ogawa (until 1 March); Noburo Suzuki (starting 1 March)
- Ehime Prefecture: Shizuo Furukawa (until 15 July); Yoshio Mochinaga (starting 15 July)
- Fukui Prefecture: Nakano Yoshiro (until 14 April); Kiyoshi Kimura (starting 14 April)
- Fukuoka Prefecture: Kyuichi Kodama (starting 1940)
- Fukushima Prefecture: Seikichi Kimishima (until 5 September); Seikichi Hashimoto (starting 5 September)
- Gifu Prefecture: Miyano Shozo
- Gunma Prefecture: Shozo Tsuchiya (until 17 April); Kumano Ei (starting 17 April)
- Hiroshima Prefecture: Ichisho Inuma (until 5 September); Katsuroku Aikawa (starting 5 September)
- Ibaraki Prefecture: Shigeru Hamaza (until 11 January); Tokitsugi Yoshinaga (starting 11 January)
- Ishikawa Prefecture: Masasuke Kodama then Narita Ichiro
- Iwate Prefecture: Chiyoji Yukizawa
- Kagawa Prefecture: Nagatoshi Fujioka
- Kanagawa Prefecture: Seiichi Ōmura then Ichisho Inuma
- Kumamoto Prefecture: Tomoichi Koyama
- Kochi Prefecture: Fujioka Nagawa (until 17 April); Shunsuke Kondo (starting 17 April)
- Kyoto Prefecture: Tota Akamatsuko
- Mie Prefecture: Masatoshi Sato (until 3 January); Masanari Ogawa (starting 1 March)
- Miyagi Prefecture: Ryosaku Shimizu
- Miyazaki Prefecture:
  - until 12 April: Jiro Ino
  - 12 April-7 September: Kyuichiro Totsuka
  - starting 7 September: Ryosaku Shimizu
- Nagano Prefecture: Tomita Kenji
- Nagasaki Prefecture: Jitsuzo Kawanishi
- Niigata Prefecture: Yasujiro Nakamura (until 5 September); Seikichi Kimishima (starting 5 September)
- Okinawa Prefecture: Fusataro Fuchigami
- Saga Prefecture: Tomoichi Koyama (until 17 April); Kato (starting 17 April)
- Saitama Prefecture: Toki Ginjiro
- Shiname Prefecture: Kyuichi Kodama (until 9 April); ... (starting 9 April)
- Tochigi Prefecture: Adachi Shuuritsu
- Tokyo: Okada Shuzo
- Toyama Prefecture: Kenzo Yano
- Yamagata Prefecture: Takei Yoshitsugu (until 17 April); Ishiguro Takeshige (starting 17 April)

== Events ==
- February – Hainan Island Operation
- March – Battle of Xiushui River
- March 1 – According to Japanese government official confirmed report, Japanese Imperial Army ammunition dump explode in Hirakata, Osaka Prefecture, 94 persons were human fatalities, 602 persons were hurt.
- March 17-May 9 – Battle of Nanchang
- April 20-May 24 – Battle of Suixian–Zaoyang
- May 11-September 16 – Battles of Khalkhin Gol
- June – Swatow Operation
- June 1 –Nippon Electric Works and Showa Fertilizer were merger, becomes name was Showa Denko.
- September 13-October 8 – Battle of Changsha (1939)
- Unknown date – Mukogawa Higher Women's School was founded, as predecessor of Mukogawa Women's University.

== Births ==
- January 11 – Tetsuya Chiba, manga artist (d. 2026)
- February 9 – Tadahiro Matsushita, politician (d. 2012)
- February 17 – Toshihiro Nikai, politician
- March 2 – Takako, Princess Suga, youngest child of Emperor Shōwa
- April 9 – Ikuko Tani, actress, voice actress and narrator
- August 13 – Shijaku Katsura II, rakugo performer (d. 1999)
- September 22 – Junko Tabei, mountaineer, first woman to reach the summit of Mount Everest (d. 2016)

== Deaths ==
- February 18 – Kanoko Okamoto, author, poet, and Buddhist scholar (b. 1889)
- March 29 – Michizō Tachihara, poet and architect (b. 1914)
- September 7 – Kyōka Izumi, novelist and Kabuki playwright (b. 1873)
- November 11 – Kagaku Murakami, painter and illustrator (b. 1888)
- December 25 – Masao Nakamura, major general (b. 1892)

== See also ==
- List of Japanese films of the 1930s
