= 1941 in Japan =

- Decades: 1920s; 1930s; 1940s; 1950s; 1960s
- See also: Other events of 1941; History of Japan • Timeline • Years

Events in the year 1941 in Japan. It corresponds to Shōwa 16 (昭和16年) in the Japanese calendar.

== Incumbents ==
- Emperor: Hirohito
- Prime Minister:
  - Fumimaro Konoe (until October 18)
  - Hideki Tōjō (starting October 18)

=== Governors ===
- Aichi Prefecture: Kodama Kyuichi (until 26 March); Yukisawa Chiyoji (starting 26 March)
- Akita Prefecture: Fumi
- Aomori Prefecture: Seiichi Ueda
- Ehime Prefecture: Shizuo Furukawa (until 4 November); Susumu Nakamura Noriyuki (starting 4 November)
- Fukui Prefecture: Kubota
- Fukushima Prefecture: Sumio Hisakawa
- Gifu Prefecture: Miyano Shozo (until 7 January); Tetsushin Sudo (starting 7 January)
- Gunma Prefecture: Susukida Yoshitomo (until 20 October); Goro Murata (starting 20 October)
- Hiroshima Prefecture: Katsuroku Aikawa (until 26 March); Tokiji Yoshinaga (starting 26 March)
- Ibaraki Prefecture: Tokitsugi Yoshinaga (until 26 March); Kanichi Naito (starting 26 March)
- Iwate Prefecture: Yoshifumi Yamauchi
- Kagawa Prefecture: Osamu Eianhyaku
- Kanagawa Prefecture: Mitsuma Matsumura
- Kochi Prefecture: Tomoichi Koyama (until 7 January); Naoaki Hattori (starting 7 January)
- Kumamoto Prefecture: Chioji Yukisawa
- Kyoto Prefecture: Ando Kyoushirou
- Mie Prefecture: Yoshiro Nakano
- Miyagi Prefecture: Nobuo Hayashin (starting 7 January)
- Miyazaki Prefecture: Toru Hasegawa (until 7 January); Osafume Katsumi (starting 7 January)
- Nagano Prefecture: Noburo Suzuki
- Niigata Prefecture: Yasui Seiichiro (until 7 January); Doi Shohei (starting 7 January)
- Okinawa Prefecture: Fusataro Fuchigami (until 7 January); Hajime Hayakawa (starting 7 January)
- Saga Prefecture: Masaki (until 26 March); Yue Yue (starting 26 March)
- Saitama Prefecture: Toki Ginjiro (until 7 April); Miyano Shozo (starting 7 April)
- Shiname Prefecture: Yasuo Otsubo
- Tochigi Prefecture: Saburo Yamagata
- Tokyo: Okada Shuzo (until 7 January); Jitsuzo Kawanishi (starting 7 January)
- Toyama Prefecture: Kenzo Yano (until 7 January); Kingo Machimura (starting 7 January)
- Yamagata Prefecture: Hee Yamauchi

== Events ==
- January 25 – Panjiayu tragedy
- January 30-March 1 – Battle of South Henan
- March – Western Hubei Operation
- March 14-April 9 – Battle of Shanggao
- May 7–27 – Battle of South Shanxi
- July 29 – Organo is founded, as predecessor name was Yamanashi Chemical Industry.
- September 6-October 8 – Battle of Changsha (1941)
- September 16 – An express train collision with standing local passenger train in Aboshi Station, Himeji, Hyogo Prefecture. Total 85 persons were fatalities, 71 persons were wounded, according to Railway Ministry of Japan official confirmed report.
- October 22 – Takahito, Prince Mikasa (younger brother of Emperor Hirohito) marries Yuriko Takagi, henceforth Yuriko, Princess Mikasa.
- November Unknown – Toyō Optical and glass Manufacturing, as predecessor of optical instrument brand, Hoya was founded.
- December 7 – Attack on Pearl Harbor, the beginning of the Pacific War of World War II
- December 7–13 – Niihau Incident
- December 8–10 – Battle of Guam (1941)
- December 8–23 – Battle of Wake Island
- December 8–25 – Battle of Hong Kong
- December 8–February 15, 1942 – Malayan campaign

== Births ==
- January 2 – Kazuyoshi Akiyama, conductor (d. 2025)
- January 3 – Shima Iwashita, actress and the wife of director Masahiro Shinoda
- January 5 – Hayao Miyazaki, film director, producer, screenwriter, animator, author, and manga artist
- January 14 – Yoriko Kawaguchi, politician and former Japanese Minister of Foreign Affairs
- January 22 – Rintaro, anime director
- April 11 – Kazuhiro Sugita, government official (d. 2025)
- May 7 – Kinichi Hagimoto, comedian
- June 20 – Kôji Ishizaka, actor
- June 21 – Aiko Nagayama, actress
- June 29 – Chieko Baisho, actress and singer
- July 8 – Masayuki Minami, volleyball player (d. 2000)
- August 9 – Renji Ishibashi, actor
- August 26 – Akiko Wakabayashi, actress
- September 10 – Gunpei Yokoi, creator of Game Boy and Game & Watch handheld systems (d. 1997)
- September 17 – Isao Hashizume, actor
- October 3 – Yoko Nosaka, musician and wife of Akiyuki Nosaka
- October 8 – Yoshiko Mita, actress
- November 21 – Eiji Kanie, voice actor (d. 1985)
- December 10 – Kyu Sakamoto, singer and actor (d. 1985)

== Deaths ==
- January 22 – Hayashi Tadataka, former daimyō (b. 1848)
- August 22 – Hasegawa Shigure, playwright (b. 1879)
- August 27 – Mitsuko Aoyama, emigrate, wife of Heinrich von Coudenhove-Kalergi (b. 1874)
- September 2 – Kei Okami, physician, first Japanese woman to obtain a degree in Western medicine from a Western university (b. 1859)
- December 11 – Masaaki Iinuma, aviator, flew the first Japanese-built aircraft from Japan to Western Europe (b. 1912)
- December 13 – Shigenori Nishikaichi, military pilot (b. ca.1919)
- December 24 – Sueo Ōe, athlete (killed in action) (b. 1914)

== See also ==
- List of Japanese films of the 1940s
