= Fumie (given name) =

- Gender: Female

Origin
- Origin: Japanese
- Meaning: Different meanings depending on the kanji used

Fumie (written: 文江, 文恵, 文絵, 文枝, 史江, 史恵, 史絵, 章江, 章枝 or ふみえ in hiragana) is a feminine Japanese given name. Notable people with the name include:

- Fumie Hama (浜 文恵; born 1939), Japanese speed skater
- Fumie Hosokawa (細川 ふみえ; born 1971), Japanese actress, singer, and model
- Fumie Kashiyama (樫山 文枝; born 1941), Japanese actress
- Fumie Kurotori (黒鳥 文絵; born 1975), Japanese swimmer
- Fumie Kusachi (草地 章江; born 1969), Japanese voice actress
- Fumie Mizusawa (水沢 史絵; born 1980), Japanese voice actress
- Fumie Nakajima (中島 史恵; born 1968), Japanese actress
- Fumie Shibata (柴田 文江; born 1965), Japanese industrial designer
- Fumie Suguri (村主 章枝; born 1980), Japanese figure skater
- Fumie Takehara (竹原 史恵; born 1987), Japanese heptathlete
- Fumie Wakabayashi (若林 史江; born 1977), Japanese stock critic and radio personality

== See also ==
- Fumi
- Fumi-e
