= Iwami =

Iwami may refer to:

- Iwami Province (石見国), an old province of Japan
- Iwami, Shimane (石見町), a former town in Shimane, Japan
- Iwami, Tottori (岩美町), a town in Tottori, Japan
- Iwami Airport in Shimane, Japan
- Iwami Ginzan Silver Mine
- Japanese battleship Iwami, a battleship renamed on capture by Japan in 1905

== People with the surname ==
- Manaka Iwami (石見 舞菜香), Japanese voice actress
- Reika Iwami (岩見 禮花, born 1927), Japanese artist
- Takao Iwami (岩見 隆夫, 1935–2014), Japanese political pundit and journalist
- Tasuku Iwami (岩見 亮, born 1978), Japanese tennis player

== See also ==
- Iwami Station (disambiguation)
