= Tejima =

Tejima (written: 手島) is a Japanese surname. Notable people with the surname include:

- Keizaburo Tejima (手島 圭三郎, born 1935), Japanese artist and children's book illustrator
- Seiichi Tejima (手島 精一, 1850–1918), Japanese educator
- Yuu Tejima (手島 優, born 1982), Japanese gravure idol, television personality and actress

== See also ==
- 8731 Tejima, a main-belt asteroid
