= Keizaburō =

- Gender: Male

Origin
- Origin: Japanese
- Meaning: Different meanings depending on the kanji used

Keizaburō, Keizaburo or Keizaburou (written: 圭三郎 or 啓三郎) is a masculine Japanese given name. Notable people with the name include:

- Keizaburo Tejima (手島 圭三郎; born 1935), Japanese artist and children's book illustrator
