= 1937 in Japan =

- Decades: 1910s; 1920s; 1930s; 1940s; 1950s
- See also: Other events of 1937; History of Japan • Timeline • Years

Events in the year 1937 in Japan.

== Incumbents ==
- Emperor: Hirohito
- Prime Minister:
  - Kōki Hirota: until February 2
  - Senjūrō Hayashi: from February 2 until June 4
  - Fumimaro Konoe: from June 4

=== Governors ===
- Aichi Prefecture: Eitaro Shinohara (until 10 February); Kotaro Tanaka (starting 10 February)
- Akita Prefecture: Kiyoshi Honma (until 24 June); Kaoru Sasaki (starting 24 June)
- Aomori Prefecture: Masanori Ogawa
- Ehime Prefecture: Shizuo Furukawa
- Fukui Prefecture: Masanori Hanyu (until 4 November); Nakano Yoshiro (starting 4 November)
- Fukushima Prefecture: Ito Takehiko (until 7 July); Seikichi Kimishima (starting 7 July)
- Gifu Prefecture: Chiaki Saka (until 20 February); Miyano Shozo (starting 20 February)
- Gunma Prefecture: Seikichi Kimishima (until 7 July); Shozo Tsuchiya (starting 7 July)
- Hiroshima Prefecture: Saburo Hayakawa (until 8 January); Aijiro Tomita (starting 8 January)
- Ibaraki Prefecture: Ando Kyoushirou (until 8 January); Nobuo Hayashi (starting 8 January)
- Ishikawa Prefecture: Masasuke Kodama (until 1938); Shunsuke Kondo (starting 1938)
- Iwate Prefecture: Hidehiko Ishiguro (until 5 June); Chiyoji Yukizawa (starting 5 June)
- Kagawa Prefecture: Nagatoshi Fujioka (until 24 December); Shojiro Tamada (starting 24 December)
- Kumamoto Prefecture: Fujioka Nagawa
- Kochi Prefecture: Kobayashi Mitsumasa
- Kyoto Prefecture: Keiichi Suzuki
- Mie Prefecture:
  - until 8 January: Aijiro Tomita
  - 8 January-4 November: Ando Kyoushirou
  - 4 November-24 December: Hanyu Masaki
  - starting 24 December: Masatoshi Sato
- Miyagi Prefecture: Yoshio Kikuyama
- Miyazaki Prefecture: Seiya Mishima (until 7 July); Katsuroku Aikawa (starting 7 July)
- Nagano Prefecture: Shinsuke Kondo
- Niigata Prefecture: Sekiya Nobuyuki
- Okayama Prefecture: Hisashi Kurashige
- Okinawa Prefecture: Hisashi Kurashige
- Saga Prefecture: Shizuo Furukawa (until 7 July); Tomoichi Koyama (starting 7 July)
- Saitama Prefecture: Jitsuzo Kawanishi
- Shiname Prefecture: Kyuichi Kodama
- Tochigi Prefecture: Hachimintsu Matsumura (until 1 October); Adachi Shuuritsu (starting 1 October)
- Tokyo: Tetsuji Kan
- Toyama Prefecture: Ginjiro Toki
- Yamagata Prefecture: Takei Yoshitsugu

== Events ==
- January 4 – Two plates containing 58 scales are stolen off of the kinshachi (a kind of dolphin fish) affixed to the top of the castle tower of Nagoya Castle. The culprit was apprehended 23 days later.
- February 11 – Hasegawa Builder Corporation, as predecessor of Haseko Corporation founded in Amagasaki, Hyōgo Prefecture.
- March 15-May 31 – Nagoya Pan-Pacific Peace Exposition (1937)
- March 30 – Marui founded as installndnt credit store in Nakano, Tokyo.
- March 31 – 1937 Japanese general election
- May – Mitsubishi Real Estate was founded.
- July 6 – According to Japanese government official confirmed report, a caught fire in Handa Mental Rescue Hospital in Hiroshima City, kills 23 persons.
- July 7–9 – Marco Polo Bridge Incident
- early July-early August – Battle of Beiping-Tianjin
- July 26 – Langfang Incident
- July 29 – Tungchow Mutiny
- August – Operation Chahar
- August–November – Tianjin–Pukou Railway Operation
- August–December – Beiping-Hankou Railway Operation
- August 13-November 26 – Battle of Shanghai
- September 1-November 9 – Battle of Taiyuan
- September 13-November 11 – Battle of Xinkou
- September 24–25 – Battle of Pingxingguan
- October 26-November 1 – Defense of Sihang Warehouse
- December 12 – USS Panay incident
- December 20 – According to former Japan Education Ministry official confirmed report, a caught fire in South Tonda Primary School, Wakayama Prefecture, kills 81 persons, mostly school children.

== Births ==
- February 12 – Keisuke Sagawa, actor (d. 2017)
- March 25 – Hidekatsu Shibata, actor, voice actor and narrator
- March 29 – Shigeaki Mori, historian (d. 2026)
- April 1 – Noriko Ishihara, essayist and the childhood wife of Shintaro Ishihara (d. 2022)
- April 6 – Minoru Betsuyaku, playwright, novelist, and essayist (d. 2020)
- April 18 – Keiko Abe, marimba player and composer
- May 10 – Emiko Miyamoto, volleyball player (Oriental Witches) (d. 2023)
- May 26 – Monkey Punch, manga artist (Lupin III) (d. 2019)
- May 29 – Hibari Misora, singer and actress (d. 1989)
- June 25 – Keizō Obuchi, Prime Minister of Japan (d. 2000)
- July 3 – Hiroko Mori, Micronesian politician
- July 14 – Yoshirō Mori, Prime Minister of Japan
- July 29 – Ryutaro Hashimoto, Prime Minister of Japan (d. 2006)
- August 26 – Kenji Utsumi, actor and voice actor (d. 2013)

== Deaths ==
- May 2 – Takuji Iwasaki, meteorologist, biologist, ethnologist historian (b. 1869)
- July 16 – Kanichiro Tashiro, lieutenant general (b. 1881)
- August 19:
  - Ikki Kita, philosopher and writer (b 1883)
  - Asaichi Isobe, army officer (b 1905)
  - Takaji Muranaka, Army officer (b 1903)
- October 22 – Chūya Nakahara, poet (b 1907)
- December 6 – Sone Tatsuzō, architect (b 1853)

== See also ==
- List of Japanese films of the 1930s
