= Yoshikazu Minami =

Yoshikazu Minami may refer to:

- Yoshikazu Minami (photographer) (born 1935), Japanese photographer
- Yoshikazu Minami (shogi) (born 1963), Japanese shōgi player
