= Ken'ichi Kumagai =

Japanese politician

- 熊谷 憲一

Member of the House of Representatives
- In office 1 October 1952 – 9 October 1956
- Preceded by: Shigetaka Ikemi
- Succeeded by: Shigeki Nakashima
- Constituency: Fukuoka 1st

27th Director-General of the Hokkaidō Agency
- In office 21 April 1945 – 26 October 1945
- Monarch: Hirohito
- Preceded by: Chiaki Saka
- Succeeded by: Yoshio Mochinaga

Governor of Yamaguchi Prefecture
- In office 1 July 1943 – 8 July 1944
- Monarch: Hirohito
- Preceded by: Yoshio Sasaki
- Succeeded by: Ueda Seiichi

Governor of Okayama Prefecture
- In office 5 September 1939 – 26 February 1940
- Monarch: Hirohito
- Preceded by: Kiyoshi Honma
- Succeeded by: Mitsuteru Yokomizo

Personal details
- Born: 2 October 1895 Fukuoka Prefecture, Japan
- Died: 9 October 1956 (aged 61)
- Party: Liberal (1952–1955)
- Other political affiliations: LDP (1955–1956)
- Education: Tokyo Imperial University

Ken'ichi Kumagai (熊谷 憲一, Kumagai Ken'ichi; 2 October 1895 – 9 October 1956) was a Japanese bureaucrat and politician. A career official of the Home Ministry and related wartime agencies, he served as Governor of Okayama Prefecture and Yamaguchi Prefecture, as the 27th Director-General of the Hokkaidō Agency, and after the war as a member of the House of Representatives from Fukuoka 1st district.

== Early life and education ==
Kumagai was born in October 1895 in Fukuoka Prefecture. He graduated from the German law course of the law faculty of Tokyo Imperial University in 1920.

== Career ==
Kumagai entered government service as a Home Ministry official. Before becoming a prefectural governor, he served in a number of senior administrative posts, including as accounting section chief in the ministry's Insurance Department, as an interior ministry secretary, and as head of the Employment Bureau in the Ministry of Health and Welfare.

On 5 September 1939 he was appointed Governor of Okayama Prefecture. An official Okayama Prefecture historical list gives his tenure as lasting until 26 February 1940, when he was transferred out of the prefectural governorship. He then became head of the Cabinet Intelligence Bureau and later chief of the Social Bureau of the Health and Welfare Ministry.

During the wartime reorganisation of the state bureaucracy, Kumagai also served as chief of the General Affairs Bureau of the Imperial Rule Assistance Association. By 1943 he was serving as Governor of Yamaguchi Prefecture. In July 1944 he left the governorship to become vice director-general of the Air Defense General Headquarters, as recorded in an appointment entry in the National Archives of Japan Digital Archive.

On 21 April 1945 Kumagai was appointed the 27th Director-General of the Hokkaidō Agency, his tenure as lasting until 26 October 1945. He was also appointed as Hokkai chihō sōkan (North Sea Local Governor) in June 1945, reflecting the wartime regional-administration structure introduced in the final months of the war.

After the war, Kumagai worked as a lawyer and later served as administrative affairs chief of the policy research council of the Liberal Party. He was elected to the House of Representatives from Fukuoka 1st district at the 1952 Japanese general election, was re-elected in 1953, and won a third term in 1955.

== Death ==
Kumagai died on 9 October 1956 while still a sitting member of the House of Representatives.
