= Mineokasankei Prefectural Natural Park =

Natural park of Chiba prefecture, Japan

- 県立嶺岡山系自然公園
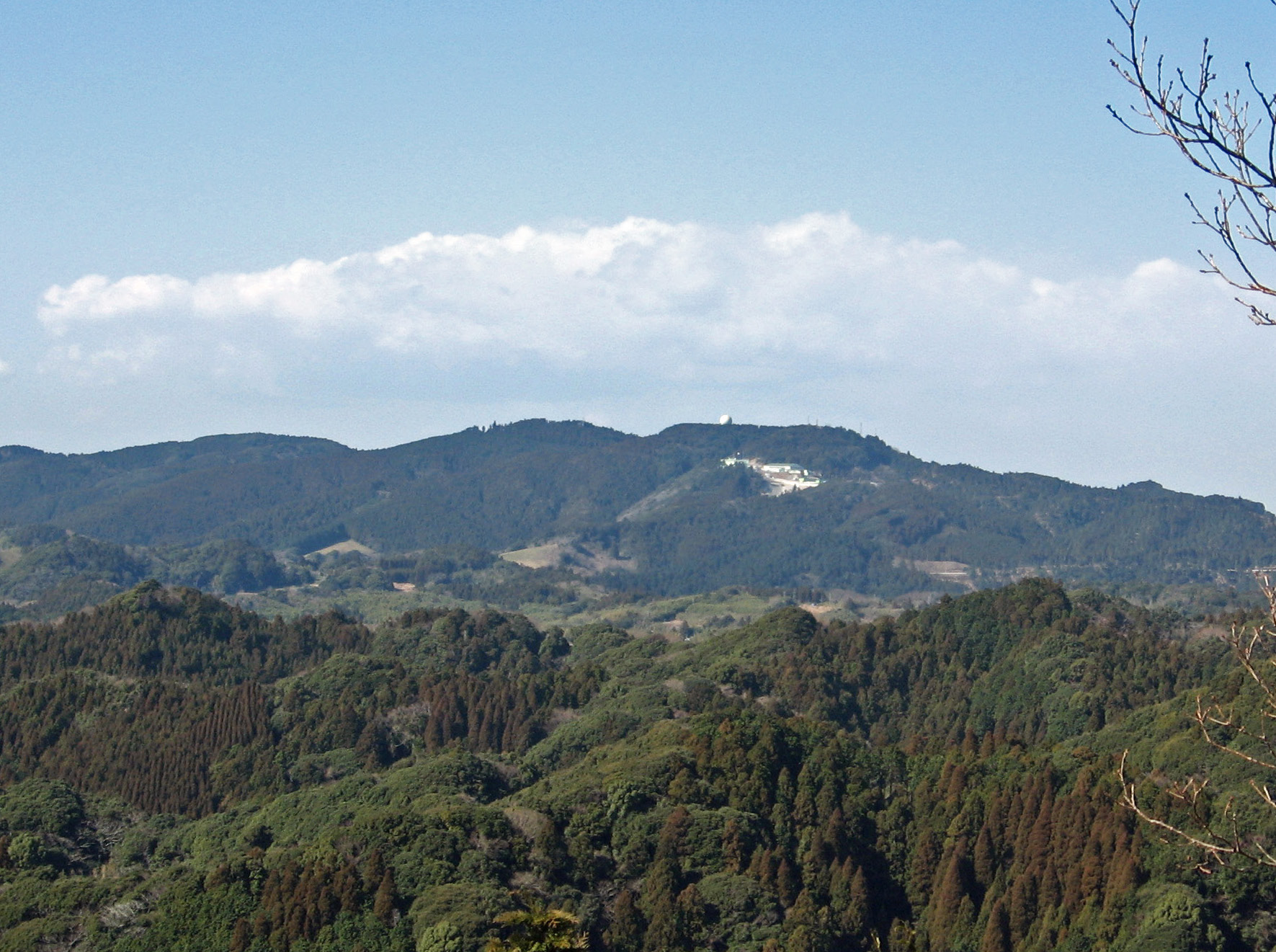
- Mineoka Mountains
- Interactive map of Mineokasankei Prefectural Natural Park
- Location: Chiba Prefecture, Japan
- Coordinates: 35°06′40″N 140°02′03″E
- Area: 15.74 km^{2} (6.08 sq mi)
- Established: 9 August 1935

Mineokasankei Prefectural Natural Park (県立嶺岡山系自然公園, Kenritsu Mineokasankei shizen kōen) is a Prefectural Natural Park in southern Chiba Prefecture, Japan. First designated for protection in 1935, the park's central features are the Mineoka Mountains. The park spans the municipalities of Kamogawa and Minamibōsō.

== See also ==
- National Parks of Japan
