= Panjiayu Massacre =

Massacre by the Japanese in China

Panjiayu massacre
- Part of the Second Sino-Japanese War
- Location: Panjiayu, Fengrun, Hebei, China
- Date: 25 January 1941; Early morning to 5 p.m
- Target: Chinese villagers in Panjiayu
- Attack type: Massacre, mass murder, summary execution, war crime and rape
- Deaths: ~1,230
- Perpetrator: Imperial Japanese Army
- Motive: Ultranationalism, Japanese imperialism, Sinophobia

The Panjiayu massacre (Chinese: 潘家峪惨案) was a massacre of villagers carried out by the Imperial Japanese Army during the Second Sino-Japanese War in Panjiayu Village, Fengrun County (now Fengrun District, Tangshan), Hebei Province, China. Since July 1938, the Eastern Hebei Anti-Japanese Base Area had used Panjiayu Village as a base for anti-Japanese resistance, with important institutions such as the Eastern Hebei Special Administrative Office and the Eastern Hebei Military District Headquarters stationed there. By 1941, villagers had cooperated with the Eighth Route Army to repel multiple Japanese "village-clearing" operations. In the second half of 1940, the Japanese army implemented the “Three Alls” (kill all, burn all, loot all) policy in North China. The Chinese government built a memorial hall in that village in 1998. On 24 January 1941, while the Eastern Hebei Military District was participating in the Hundred Regiments Offensive, the Japanese forces stationed in Tangshan, together with collaborators from the puppet government, planned a massacre targeting Panjiayu Village.

In the early hours of 25 January, Japanese and puppet troops surrounded Panjiayu Village. At dawn, villagers were driven into the West Ditch and then into the Panjia Compound within the village, where a bloody massacre ensued. Approximately 1,230 villagers were killed, with only 276 surviving. This massacre was the first large-scale atrocity carried out under the Japanese "Three Alls" policy. On 5 February, the Eastern Hebei Military District held a public funeral, burying the victims in four large graves west of the village. Surviving young villagers were organized into three youth revenge squads, later consolidated into the Panjiayu Revenge Corps in early May. On 18 July 1942, the Revenge Corps participated in the Ganhecao ambush, killing the primary perpetrator, Sasaki Jirō. After the founding of the People's Republic of China, a memorial and museum were built at the massacre site, and the local villagers erected an ancestral hall for the victims. In 2001, the Panjiayu Massacre Site was designated a national patriotic education base, and in 2006 it was listed as a Major Historical and Cultural Site Protected at the National Level.

== Background ==
=== Anti-Japanese Resistance in Eastern Hebei ===
Panjiayu Village is located in the interior of Yaodai Mountain, Fengrun County (now Fengrun District, Tangshan). In July 1938, during the Eastern Hebei Uprising, over 30 young villagers joined anti-Japanese forces under village head Pan Zuozhou. By March 1939, Eastern Hebei leadership established Panjiayu as an anti-Japanese base, relocating offices, hospitals, printing facilities, and factories to the village. A local party branch and village anti-Japanese administration were also set up. Despite repeated Japanese attacks, villagers resisted occupation, protected Eighth Route Army members, and became renowned as a fortress of resistance.

=== Japanese Plan for Massacre ===
In the summer and autumn of 1940, the Japanese command sought to end the war in North China, implementing the “Purification Construction Plan,” concentrating attacks on anti-Japanese bases, and applying the “caging” and “Three Alls” policies. In January 1941, Japanese forces in Tangshan, led by Suzuki Yoshihisa and Sasaki Takasou, together with local collaborators, planned the Panjiayu massacre. The operation was explicitly described as "fighting the Eighth Route Army" and "punishing the civilians," with orders to encircle the village and shoot anyone attempting to escape. Logistical and intelligence preparations were made, but the village's evacuation efforts failed due to negligence by local militia leaders.

== Massacre ==
In the early hours of 25 January, over 1,600 Japanese and puppet soldiers surrounded the village, which had 1,703 residents. Villagers were driven house to house, with many elderly and children killed outside. Women were raped, and homes were looted and burned. Approximately 32 villagers hiding on the south hill were executed, their bodies burned. Survivors were initially held in the West Ditch, a frozen pit, before being driven to the Panjia Compound, which had been prepared as the main killing site. Inside the compound, villagers were shot, stabbed, thrown grenades at, and burned alive. Infants and children were killed, pregnant women were mutilated, and only a few villagers survived through hiding or feigning death. The massacre lasted nearly two hours. Later, Japanese troops pretended to withdraw, luring out more survivors before continuing the killings and burning corpses. The massacre ended around 5 p.m., with the Japanese looting valuables before leaving.

== Aftermath ==
After the Japanese departure, local militia and villagers rescued survivors and buried the dead. Most corpses were severely burned, leaving only gender and age identifiable. Survivors used unburned cabinets as coffins. Party and military personnel returned on 31 January to provide aid and supplies. The total death toll was 1,230 villagers, with 33 families wiped out. Only 276 villagers survived, of whom 96 were seriously injured. Over 1,200 houses were destroyed. The surviving youth formed revenge squads, later consolidated into the Panjiayu Revenge Corps (Chinese: 潘家峪抗日复仇团, now 8th Mobile Detachment, 1st Mobile Corps), which participated in ambushes and resistance campaigns, killing over 250 Japanese and puppet soldiers, including the main perpetrator Sasaki Jirō.

During the subsequent anti-Japanese war, Panjiayu remained a resistance stronghold. Captured villagers endured torture but revealed no military secrets. In 1958, collaborators involved in the massacre, including Ling Yizhong (Chinese: 凌以忠) and Dong Penglin (Chinese: 董蓬林), were apprehended and held accountable.

== Memorials ==
In 1952, villagers built an ancestral hall west of the victims’ cemetery, rebuilt in 1980 and renovated in 2005. A memorial monument was erected in the massacre cemetery in 1951, commemorating Japanese atrocities. A massacre memorial tower was constructed in 1952, rebuilt in 1955, 9.3 meters tall, with inscriptions honoring the victims and a red star atop. In 1970, an exhibition hall was built to display artifacts and historical records; it was damaged in the 1976 Tangshan earthquake and later renovated and renamed the Panjiayu Massacre Memorial Hall. In 1997, a new memorial museum was built southwest of the Panjia Compound site. Several locations related to the massacre, including the Panjia Compound, West Ditch, and victims’ cemetery, were designated heritage sites and patriotic education bases.
