= Kōsaku Hamada =

Japanese archaeologist (1881–1938)

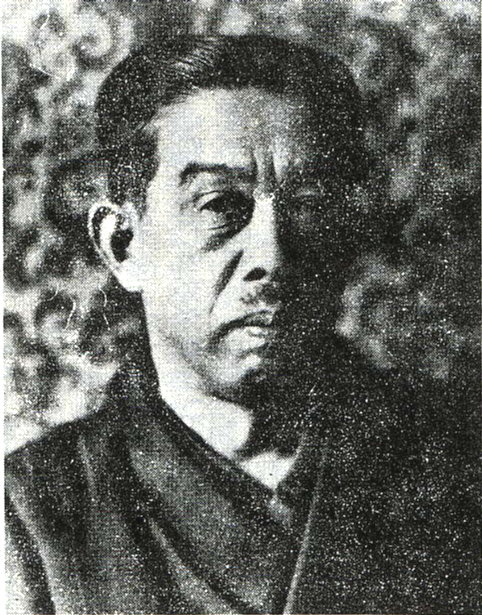
- Born: February 22, 1881; Osaka
- Died: July 25, 1938 (aged 57); Tokyo, Japan
- Occupation: Archaeologist

Kōsaku Hamada (濱田 耕作, Hamada Kōsaku; February 22, 1881 – July 25, 1938), also known as Seiryō Hamada, was a Japanese academic, archaeologist, author and President of Kyoto University.

== Early life ==
Hamada was born in Osaka. He was educated at the University of Tokyo and Kyoto University; and he studied in England.

== Career ==
In 1917, Hamada was the first archaeology professor at the Kyoto University; and he is credited with the introduction of modern research methods in Japan. His fieldwork included archaeological digs in Japan, Korea and China.

At the pinnacle of his academic career, Hamada was installed as university president in 1937.

== Selected works ==
In a statistical overview derived from writings by and about Kōsaku Hamada, OCLC/WorldCat encompasses roughly 100+ works in 200+ publications in 3 languages and 1,000+ library holdings.

- 有竹齋藏古玉譜 (1925)
- 百済観音 (1926)
- 支那古明器泥象圖說 (1927)
- Pʼi-tzu-wo; prehistoric sites by the river Pi-liu-ho, South Manchuria (1929)
- 東亞文明の黎明 (1930)
- 東亞考古學研究 (1930)
- 天正遣歐使節記 (1931)
- 南山裡: 南滿洲老鐵山麓の漢代甎墓 Nan-shan-li: Brick-tombs of the Han dynasty at the foot of Mt. Lao-t'ieh, South Manchuria (1933)
- 營城子: 前牧城驛附近の漢代壁晝甎墓 Ying-ch'êng-tzŭ (1934)
- 删訂泉屋清賞 (1934)
- 新羅古瓦の研究 (1934)
- 古物硏究 (1936)
- 日本美術史硏究 (1940)

Articles

- "Chifeng Hongshanhou," Archaeologia Orientalis, ser. A, No. 6. Far-Eastern Archaeology Society of Japan, (1938).

== Notes ==
Academic offices
Preceded by Motooki Matsui	President of Kyoto University; 1937–1938	Succeeded by Toru Haneda
