= Iwami Station =

Iwami Station is the name of two train stations in Japan:

- Iwami Station (Nara) (石見駅) - in Miyake, Shiki District, Nara Prefecture
- Iwami Station (Tottori) (岩美駅) - in Iwami, Iwami District, Tottori Prefecture
