= 1935 in Japanese football =

1935 season

Japanese football in 1935.

== Emperor's Cup ==
June 2, 1935

Kyungsung FC	6–1	Tokyo Bunri University
? ?' ? ?' ? ?' ? ?' ? ?' ? ?'		? ?'

Meiji Jingu Gaien Stadium

== Births ==
- March 8 - Akira Kitaguchi
