= Fumie Wakabayashi =

Japanese stock critic, day trader, and tarento

- 若林 史江
- Born: October 7, 1977 (age 48); Isogo-ku, Yokohama, Kanagawa Prefecture, Japan
- Education: Yokohama Tachioka Village Junior High School; Yokohama Fujimi Hill High School
- Occupations: Stock critic, tarento

Fumie Wakabayashi (若林 史江, Wakabayashi Fumie; born 7 October 1977, in Isogo-ku, Yokohama, Kanagawa Prefecture, Japan) is a Japanese stock critic, day trader, and tarento.

== Filmography ==
=== TV series ===
==== Current appearances ====
Year	Title	Network	Notes
2009	5-ji ni Muchū!	Tokyo MX	Monday, later Wednesday appearances

==== Former appearances ====
Title	Network	Notes
Sunday Japon	TBS	
Jōhō Live: Miyaneya	YTV	Regular Thursday appearances
Asa wa Vitamin!	TV Tokyo	Regular Thursday appearances
Seikatsu Kōjō Entertainment 5 Man-en de Hajimeru FX	WHC	Regular appearances

=== Radio ===
==== Former appearances ====
Title	Network	Notes
Yonayona News Ijiri: X-Radio	TBS Radio	"Kabu Ijiri!" corner
Dot Com Money Juku	NBS	
Fumie Wakabayashi no Radio de Kabu ga Suki	NBS	
Shigeki Hosokawa, Fumie Hosokawa no Kabushiki Kōza: Stylish Tōshi Life	KBC Radio	

== Bibliography ==
=== Serialisations ===
==== Former ====
Title
Net M@ney "Kabu Hajimete Kōza"
Money Japan "Kimochiyoi Tōshi no Katachi o Sagashite"

=== Books ===
Title
Kabu ga Suki
Mōkaru Kabu Erabi
Easy Kabu Go
Fumie Wakabayashi no Kabu Lesson
