= Battle of Xinfeng =

- Part of the Second Sino-Japanese War and the interwar period
Date	1 July 1938
Location	Xinfeng Railroad station in the Republic of China

Belligerents
China; National Revolutionary Army	Japan; Central China Theater Army

Commanders and leaders
(Republic of China (1912–1949)) Not reported	(Empire of Japan) Not reported

Units involved
1st Battalion of the 2nd Regiment of the 1st Detachment of the New Fourth Army and self-defense units of eight townships	?

Strength
Not reported	Not reported

Casualties and losses
1st Battalion : 4 killed, 6 wounded	Chinese Claim : 40+ troops
- No reported civilian casualties

The Battle of Xinfeng was an offensive during the Second Sino-Japanese War.

== Battle ==
On 1 July 1938, Chinese troops of the 1st Battalion, 2nd Regiment of the 1st Detachment of the New Fourth Army launched a surprise assault on the Japanese troops stationed at the Xinfeng Railway Station. This was the first battle that the Fourth Army fought at night, as the assault was launched at 11 pm. The unit then set the railway station on fire and claimed to have killed more than 30 soldiers that were in houses at the time.

During the battle the train station was burned to the ground and the army forces managed to capture six rifles with bayonets. After the battle, the Chinese unit met with local resistance fighters and managed to destroy a section of the railway and tens of telephone stations.
