= Takagoyama Prefectural Natural Park =

Natural park of Chiba prefecture, Japan

Coordinates: 35°15′N 139°57′E

- 県立高宕山自然公園
- Interactive map of Takagoyama Prefectural Natural Park
- Location: Chiba Prefecture, Japan
- Area: 23.42 km^{2} (9.04 sq mi)
- Established: 9 August 1935

Takagoyama Prefectural Natural Park (県立高宕山自然公園, Kenritsu Takagoyama shizen kōen) is a Prefectural Natural Park in south-central Chiba Prefecture, Japan. First designated for protection in 1935, the park's central feature is Mount Takago (高宕山). The park spans the municipalities of Futtsu and Kimitsu. In 1956 the habitat the mountain provides for the Japanese macaque was designated a Natural Monument.

== See also ==
- National Parks of Japan
- Monuments of Japan
