= Fumie Shibata =

Japanese product designer

- 柴田 文江
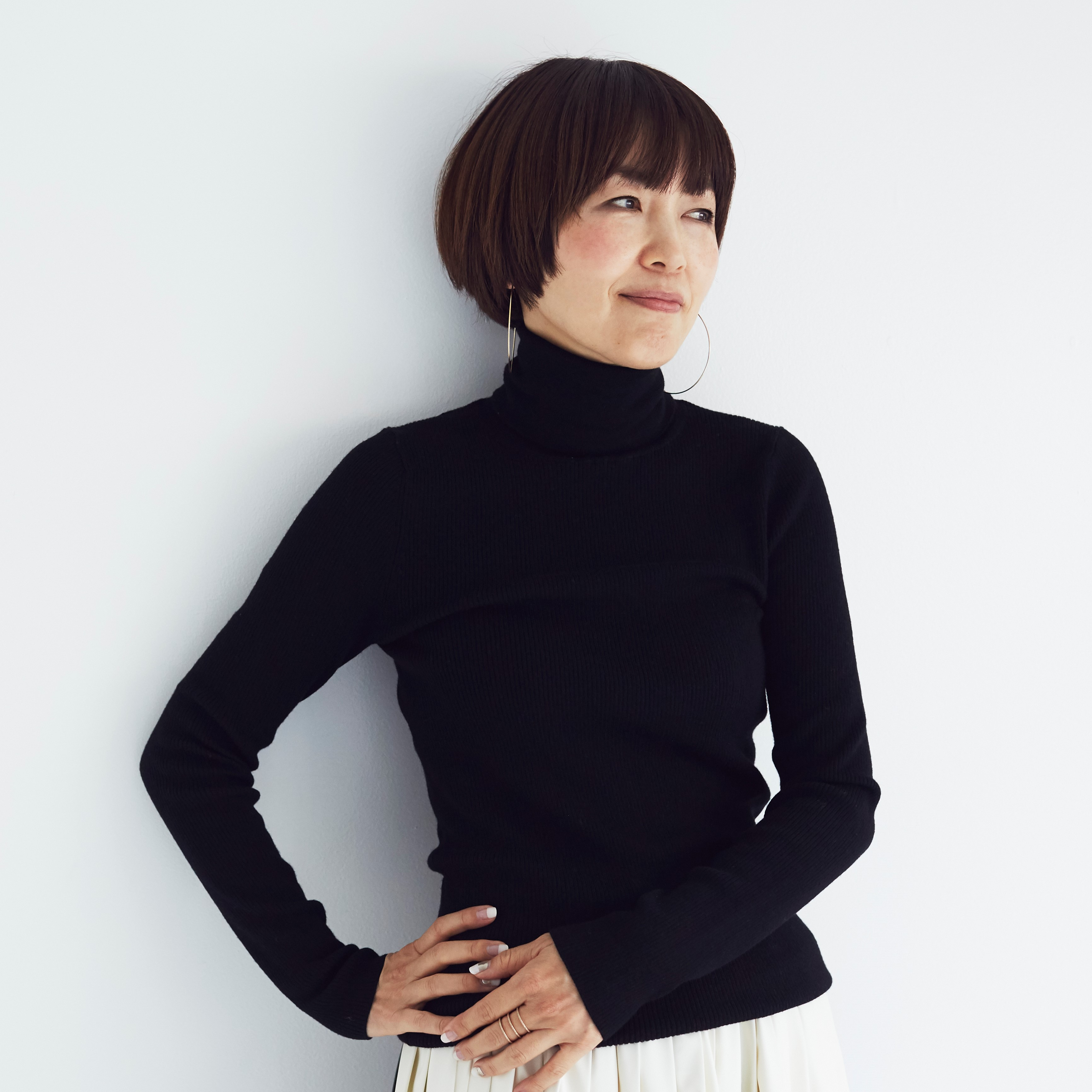
- Occupation: product designer
- Website: design-ss.com

Fumie Shibata (柴田 文江, Shibata Fumie) is a product designer who is actively based in Tokyo. She handles designs for a wide range of products, from electronics to household items, medical equipment, and even total direction duties for hotels. She is recognized for her gentle and elaborately detailed expressions of form, and she has received very high acclaim primarily throughout Asia. She is one of the most influential female designers in Japan, and she served as Chair of the Judging Committee for the Good Design Award from 2018 to 2020. She is a Japan Design Committee member.

== Select awards ==
- 2024 – Red Dot Design Award 2024 Best of the Best
- 2021 – ELLE DECO INTERNATIONAL DESIGN AWARDS
- 2020 – Good Design award Best100
- 2017 – Good Design Gold award with 2items
- 2016 – The Design Award of the Federal Republic of Germany
- 2015 – Good Design Long life design award
- 2014 – The Design Award of the Federal Republic of Germany
- 2014 – Good Design Long life design award
- 2013 – iF Award
- 2012 – Mainichi Design Prize
- 2011 – iF Award
- 2011 – Red Dot product design award
- 2011 – Good Design Gold award
- 2010 – Design for Asia Awards
- 2010 – Good Design Gold award
- 2008 – Red Dot product design award
- 2008 – iF Award
- 2007 – iF Gold Award
- 2006 – AVON Awards to Women Art Awards

== Select works ==
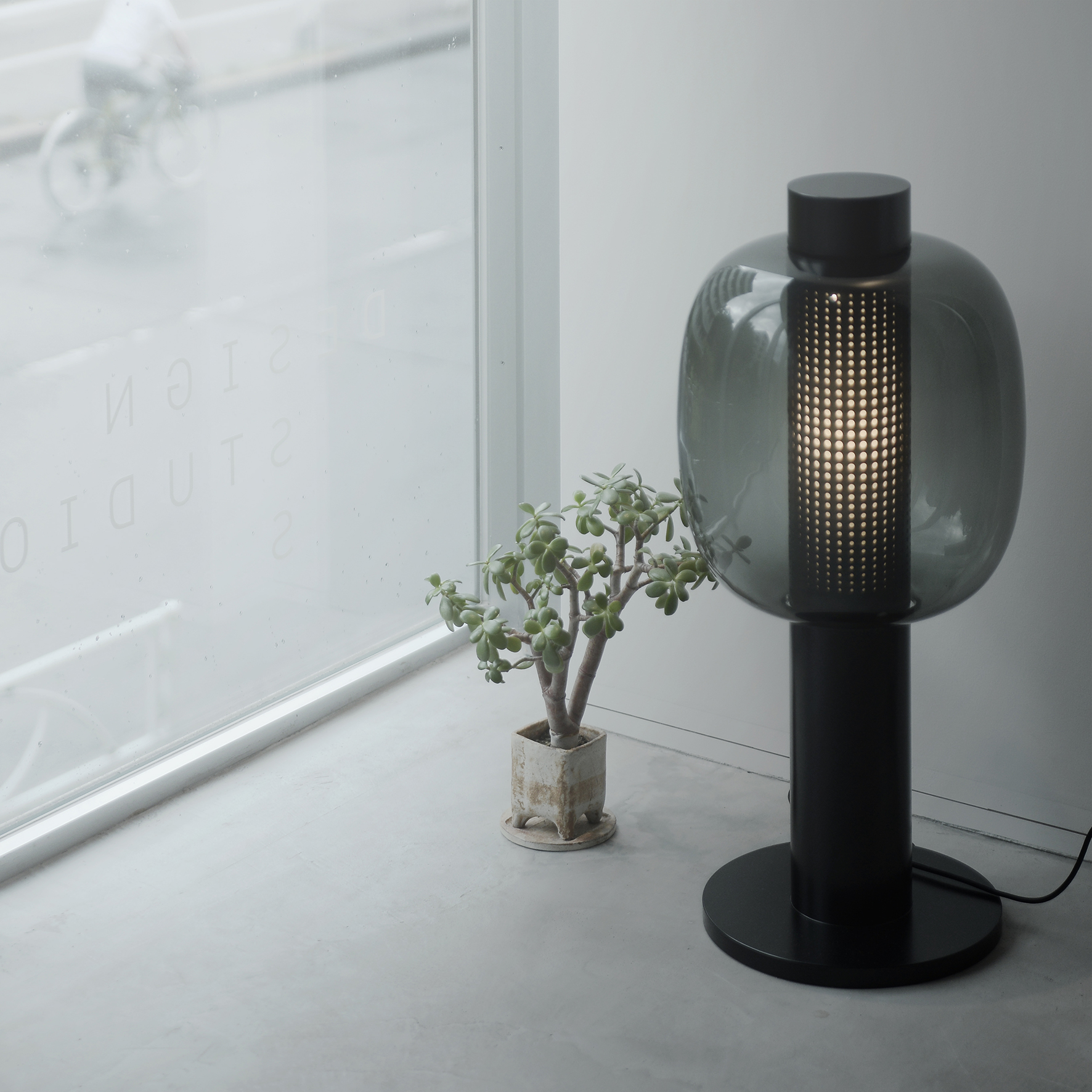
BONBORI

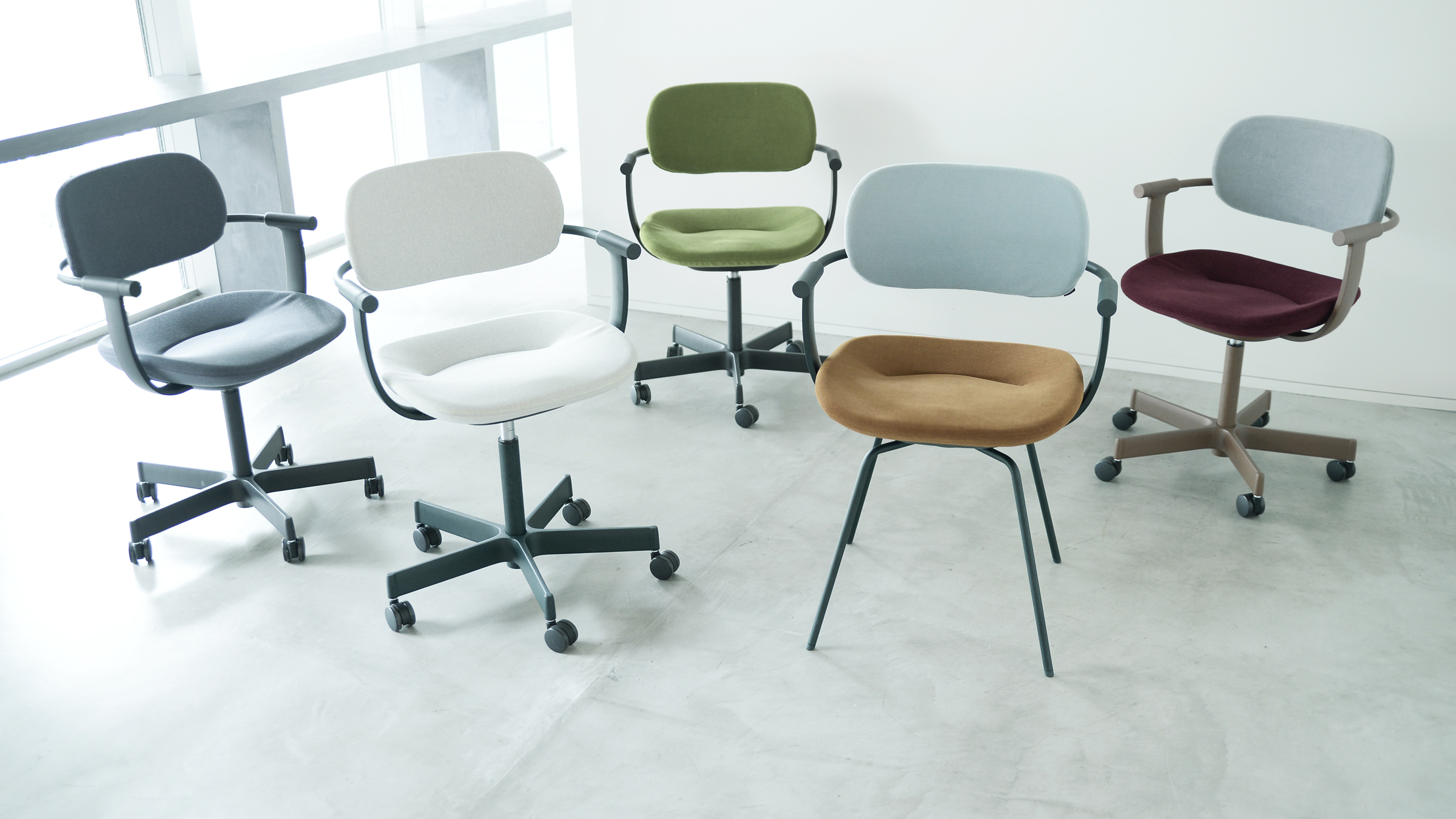
Vertebra03

ERI

- FLEXFORM
  - ERIArm chair
  - ENN Table
  - SORETO Valet stand
- Gallotti&Radice
  - KOOSHI Coffee table
- BROKIS
  - AWA Glass Lighting
  - BONBORI Glass Lighting
  - Bamboo Forest Glass Lighting series
- HOLMEGAARD
  - CADO vase
- muji
  - body fit sofa
  - Oral care series
- ITOKI
  - vertebra03 Working chair
  - SHIGA Working chair
- EcoSmart Fire
  - Halo
- KINTO
  - Unitea Combination tea set
  - Water bottle
- franky, Inc.
  - moln Suitcase
  - Mori Journaling AI
- Omron
  - Thermometer[Omron Electronic Thermometer MC-670/681]
- 9h(ninehours) Capsule Hotel

== Book ==
- 'Forms within Forms' (2012), Art Design Publishing
