= Yōrō Keikoku Okukiyosumi Prefectural Natural Park =

Natural park in Chiba Prefecture, Japan

Coordinates: 35°15′27″N 140°09′36″E

- 県立養老渓谷奥清澄自然公園
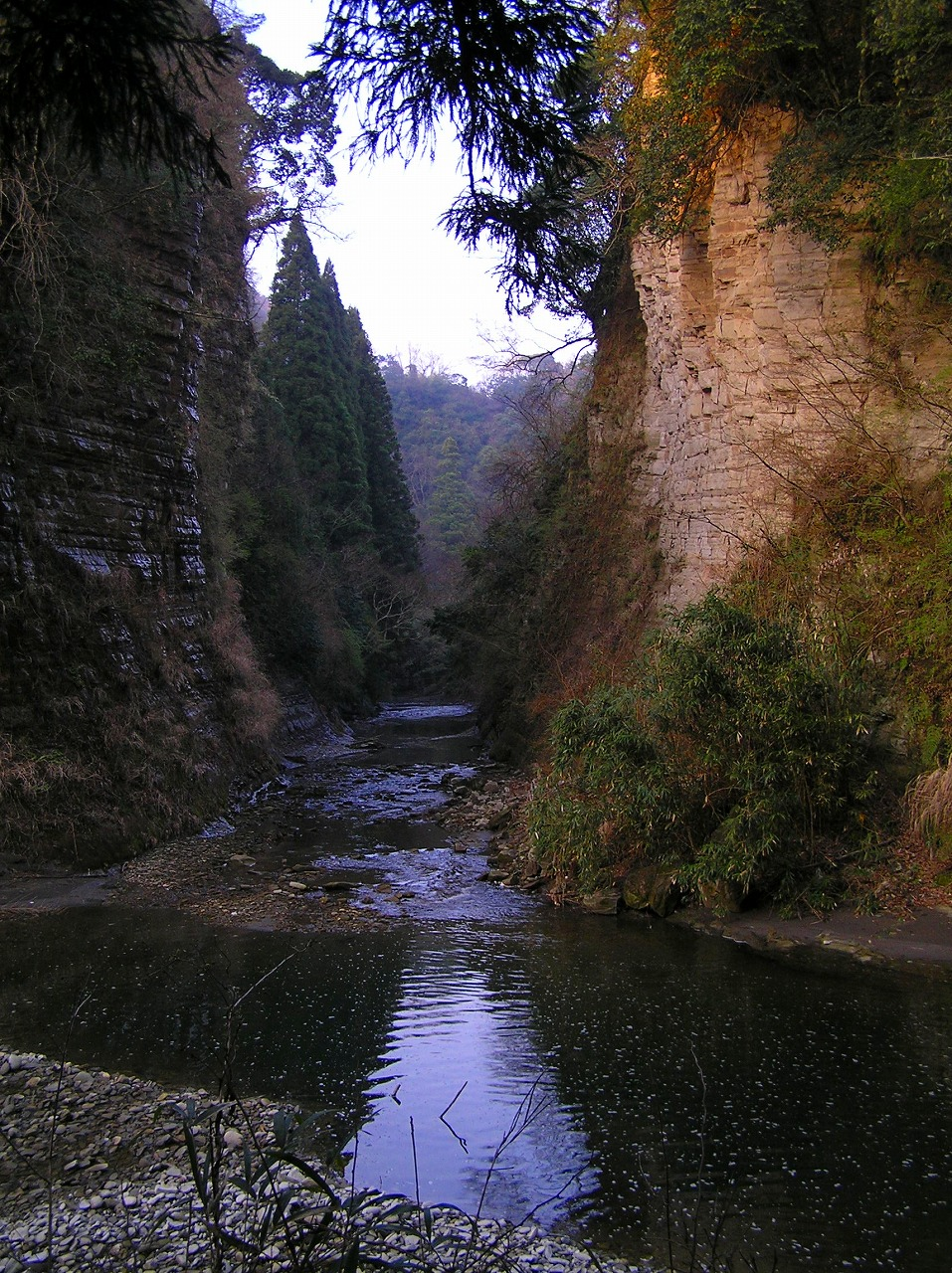
- Yōrō Gorge
- Interactive map of Yōrō Keikoku Okukiyosumi Prefectural Natural Park
- Location: Chiba Prefecture, Japan
- Area: 27.90 km^{2} (10.77 sq mi)
- Established: 9 August 1935

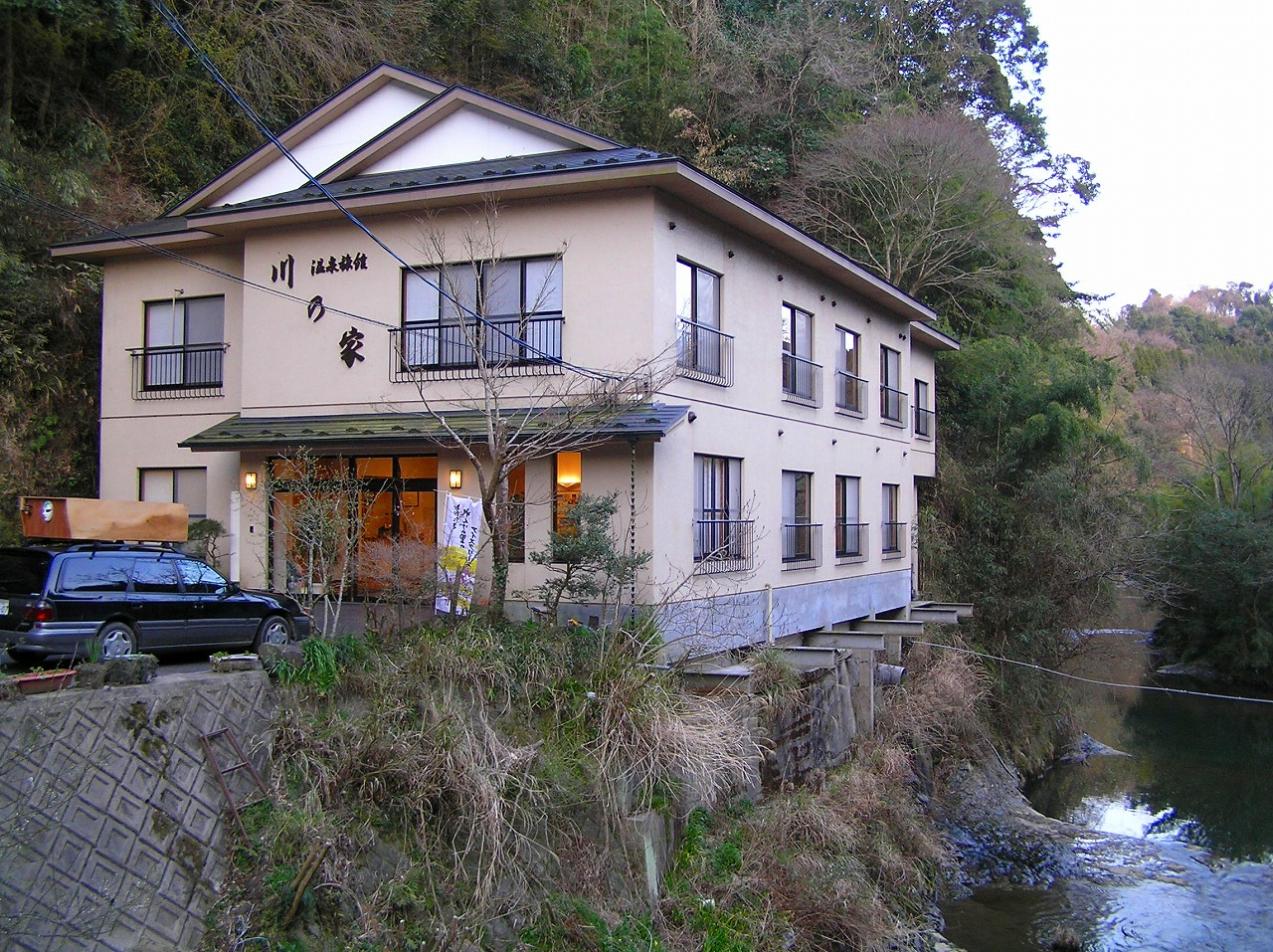
Onsen Ryokan (inn)

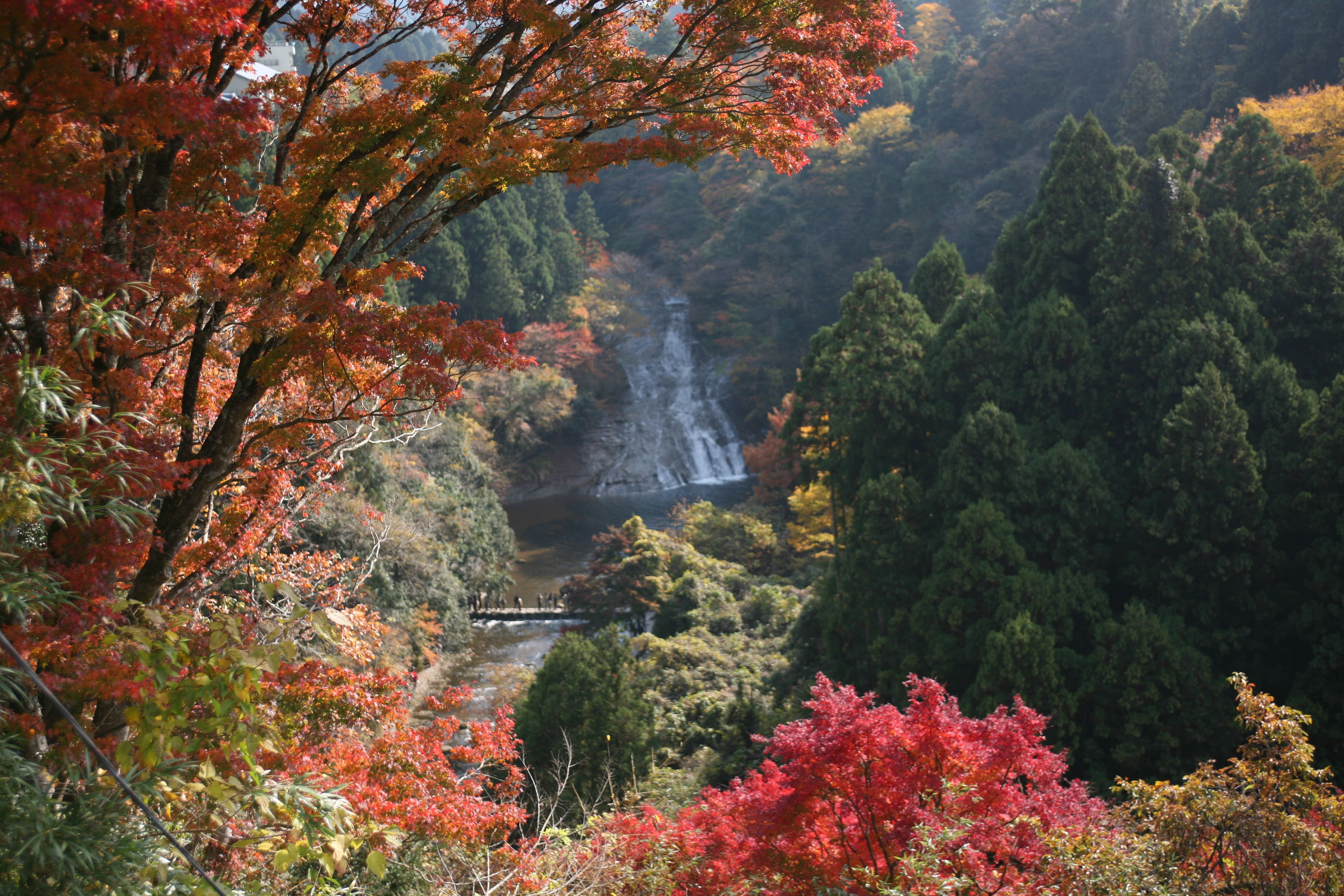
Waterfall(粟又の滝)

Yōrō Keikoku Okukiyosumi Prefectural Natural Park (県立養老渓谷奥清澄自然公園, Kenritsu Yōrō Keikoku Okukiyosumi shizen kōen) is a Prefectural Natural Park in southern Chiba Prefecture, Japan. First designated for protection in 1935, the park's central features are the Yōrō Valley (養老渓谷) and Kiyosumi Mountains (清澄山地). The park spans the municipalities of Ichihara, Kamogawa, Kimitsu, and Ōtaki.

== See also ==
- National Parks of Japan
