= Takao Iwami =

Japanese political pundit and journalist

- Born: October 6, 1935; Dalian, Kwantung Leased Territory (present-day People's Republic of China, Dalian）
- Died: January 18, 2014 (aged 78); Shinjuku, Tokyo
- Education: Kyoto University's Law Department
- Occupations: political pundit, journalist
- Years active: 1958 - 2013
- Spouse: Masako
- Children: Ichita (son), Daizo (son)

Takao Iwami (岩見隆夫, Iwami Takao; October 6, 1935 – January 18, 2014) was a Japanese political pundit and journalist.

== Life ==
Born in Dalian, he was brought up in Hōfu, Yamaguchi Prefecture. After graduating from Kyoto University's Law Department, he joined the Mainichi Shimbun in 1958, where he held several posts, among them editor-in-chief of the weekly magazine Sunday Mainichi, and, after his retirement in 2007, special advisor (since 2012).

He died on January 18, 2014, of pneumonia, after battling liver cancer for some time.

== Posts ==
- "Japan Essayists' Club" board member
- Advisor to the "Association for the Rebuilding of Edo Castle"
- JANJAN board member

== Books (selection) ==
- 『孤高の暴君 小泉純一郎』 大和書房（だいわ文庫）、2006年、ISBN 4-479-30024-4
- 『角栄以後』 講談社+α文庫（上・下） 、2005年、ISBN 4-06-256907-8
- 『陛下の御質問-昭和天皇と戦後政治』 文藝春秋（文春文庫）、2005年、ISBN 4-16-767940-X。徳間文庫、1995年
- 『日本の歴代総理大臣がわかる本』 三笠書房、2001年、ISBN 4-8379-1906-5。知的生きかた文庫、2004年
- 『竜馬はまだか-岩見隆夫の政界スキャン』 学陽書房、2000年、ISBN 4-313-81510-4
- 『なめられてたまるか』 毎日新聞社、1999年、ISBN 4-620-31339-4
- 『田中角栄－政治の天才』学陽書房（人物文庫）、1998年
- 『永田町のキーマンたち』 徳間書店（徳間文庫）、1996年、ISBN 4-19-890558-4
- 『再見戦後政治』 毎日新聞社、1995年、ISBN 4-620-31025-5
- 『実録・橋本龍太郎』 朝日ソノラマ、1995年、ISBN 4-257-03459-9
- 『昭和の妖怪 岸信介』 朝日ソノラマ、1994年、ISBN 4-257-03390-8。「岸信介 昭和の革命家」人物文庫、1999年。中公文庫、2012年
- 『平成大政変の内幕』 中央公論社]]、1993年、ISBN 4-12-002268-4
- 『自民党没落の軌跡 鈍刀とカミソリの功罪』 朝日ソノラマ、1993年、ISBN 4-257-03375-4
- 『あのころのこと-女性たちが語る戦後政治』 毎日新聞社、1993年、ISBN 4-620-30953-2
- 『中曽根康弘の鼻歌が聞こえる』 潮出版社、1986年、ISBN 4-267-01087-0
