= Yoshikazu Minami (photographer) =

Japanese photographer (born 1935)

Yoshikazu Minami (南 良和, Minami Yoshikazu; born 1935 in Chichibu, Saitama) is a Japanese photographer.
