= Fumi =

- Gender: Female

Origin
- Origin: Japanese
- Meaning: Different meanings depending on the kanji used

Other names
- Related names: Fumie

Fumi (ふみ in hiragana or フミ in katakana) is a feminine Japanese given name.

== Written forms ==
Forms in kanji include:

- 史, "history"
- 文, "sentence"
- 二三, "two, three"
- 芙美, "lotus, beauty"

The name can also be written in hiragana or katakana.

== People ==
- Fumi Dan (檀 ふみ; born 1954), Japanese actress
- Fumi Goto (後藤 史; born 1988), Japanese football defender
- Fumi Hirano (平野 文; born 1955), Japanese voice actress and essayist
- Fumi Kaneko (金子 扶生; born 1991), Japanese ballet dancer
- Fumi Kitahara (1968–2025), American publicist in the animation industry
- Fumi Kojima (児島 フミ; born 1916), Japanese discus thrower
- Fumi Morisawa (森沢 芙美), Japanese voice actress
- Fumi Nikaidō (二階堂 ふみ; born 1994), Japanese actress and fashion model
- Fumi Saimon (柴門 ふみ; born 1957), Japanese manga artist
- Fumi Yoshinaga (よしなが ふみ,; born 1971), Japanese manga artist

== Fictional characters ==
- Fumi Hasegawa (ふみ), a character in the manga series Yuyushiki
- Fumi Himeno (二三), a character in the anime series My-HiME
- Fumi Kujō (ふみ), a character in the light novel series Jinsei
- Fumi Manjōme (ふみ), a character in the manga series Aoi Hana
- Fumi Nishioka (文), a character in the manga series QQ Sweeper
- Fumi Sugi (文), a character in the television series Hana Moyu
- Fumi Yumeoji (文), a character in the Revue Starlight franchise

== See also ==
- 23455 Fumi, a main-belt asteroid
- Fumie (given name)
- Fumi-e
