= Yukio Tomeoka =

Japanese bureaucrat

- 留岡 幸男
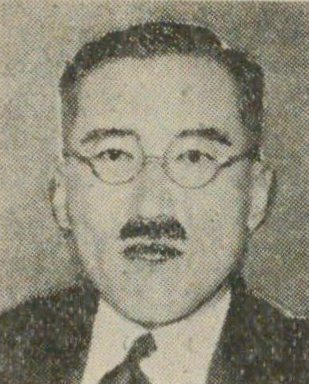
- Tomeoka, before 1935

Director-General of the Hokkaidō Agency
- In office 25 January 1946 – 25 April 1946
- Monarch: Hirohito
- Preceded by: Yoshio Mochinaga
- Succeeded by: Kaneshichi Masuda

Superintendent General of the Tokyo Metropolitan Police Department
- In office 20 October 1941 – 15 June 1942
- Preceded by: Iwao Yamazaki
- Succeeded by: Yoshinaga Tokiji

Governor of Akita Prefecture
- In office 11 January 1939 – 24 July 1940
- Monarch: Hirohito
- Preceded by: Yoshio Sasaki
- Succeeded by: Fumio Iwakami

Personal details
- Born: 16 April 1894 Takahashi, Okayama, Japan
- Died: 3 May 1981 (aged 87)
- Resting place: Tama Cemetery
- Education: Tokyo Imperial University

Yukio Tomeoka (留岡 幸男, Tomeoka Yukio; 16 April 1894 – 3 May 1981) was a Japanese bureaucrat, police official, and later lawyer. A career official of the Home Ministry, he served as Governor of Akita Prefecture, Director-General of the ministry's Local Affairs Bureau, Superintendent-General of the Metropolitan Police, and finally as Director-General of the Hokkaidō Agency.

== Early life and education ==
Tomeoka was born on 16 April 1894. Biographical sources differ on his place of origin: Kotobank and the Tokutomi Sohō Memorial Museum database describe him as being from Okayama Prefecture, while the Hokkaido Government archive gives Tokyo as his place of origin. He was the third son of the social reformer Kōsuke Tomeoka and he graduated from Tokyo Imperial University before entering the Home Ministry.

== Career ==
Before reaching senior office, Tomeoka served in a series of police and local-administration posts. He worked as police department chief in Kagawa, Niigata, and Kanagawa prefectures, while an archival list of higher local officials for March 1937 places him as Director of General Affairs in the Hokkaido Government.

In 1939 he became Governor of Akita Prefecture. He left in July 1940.

After leaving Akita he moved to the central Home Ministry. He became Director-General of the Local Affairs Bureau in 1940. National Archives material further shows that, while serving as local affairs chief, he was appointed one of the councillors of the Cabinet's Tōhoku Bureau in January 1940.

In October 1941, under the Tōjō cabinet, Tomeoka became Superintendent-General of the Metropolitan Police. He was the official responsible for maintaining security in the capital around the time of Japan's entry into the Pacific War. Material preserved in museum collections also survives from his tenure as police chief, including a certificate issued in his name as Superintendent-General.

On 25 January 1946 Tomeoka was appointed Director-General of the Hokkaidō Agency. His tenure as lasting until 25 April 1946. A study of the first postwar gubernatorial elections notes that he was among the former high officials affected by the occupation purge and that the Yoshida government accepted the resignation of the former police chief Tomeoka from the Hokkaido post in 1946.

== Later life ==
After leaving official office, Tomeoka worked as a lawyer. In 1956 he was appointed an adviser to the Local Autonomy Agency. He died on 3 May 1981.
