= Keizaburo Tejima =

Keizaburō Tejima (手島 圭三郎)
- Born: 1935 (age 90–91); Monbetsu, Hokkaido, Empire of Japan
- Writing career
- Notable works: Fox's Dream; Owl Lake; Swan Sky

Keizaburō Tejima (手島 圭三郎, Tejima Keizaburō) (born 1935) is a Japanese artist and children's picture book author. He is known for his books and their illustrations. Tejima's illustrative technique is woodblock. Books he has written and illustrated include Fox's Dream, Owl Lake, Swan Sky and The Bear's Autumn.

== Awards ==
- Fox's Dream

- Fiera di Bolognia Graphic Prize (special mention), 1986
- New York Times Best Illustrated Books, 1987
- ALA Notable Book, 1987

- Owl Lake

- Japan Prize for Outstanding Picture Books, 1983
- ALA Notable Books, 1988

- Swan Sky, NY Times Best Illustrated Books, 1988
