= Yoshio Mochinaga =

Japanese politician

- 持永 義夫
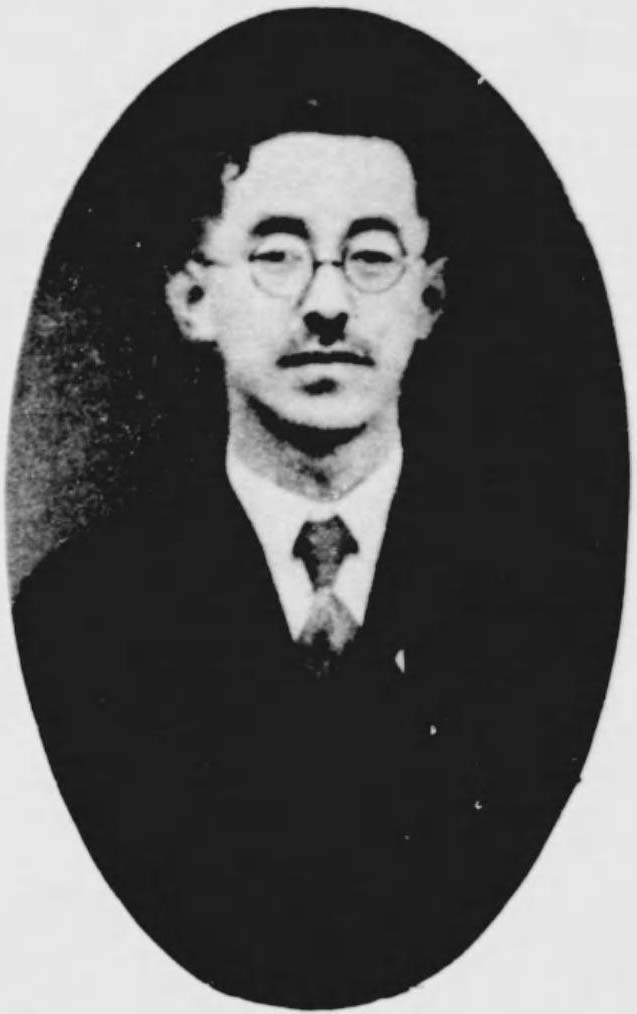
- Mochinaga in 1935

Member of the House of Representatives
- In office 1 October 1952 – 24 January 1955
- Preceded by: Mitsuo Setoyama
- Succeeded by: Osanori Koyama
- Constituency: Miyazaki 2nd

28th Director-General of the Hokkaidō Agency
- In office 27 October 1945 – 25 January 1946
- Monarch: Hirohito
- Preceded by: Ken'ichi Kumagai
- Succeeded by: Yukio Tomeoka

Governor of Hyōgo Prefecture
- In office 21 April 1945 – 27 October 1945
- Monarch: Hirohito
- Preceded by: Nagatoshi Fujioka
- Succeeded by: Saitō Akira

Governor of Mie Prefecture
- In office 1 July 1943 – 21 April 1945
- Monarch: Hirohito
- Preceded by: Kajimatsu Soga
- Succeeded by: Shimizu Shigeo

Governor of Ehime Prefecture
- In office 15 July 1939 – 24 July 1940
- Monarch: Hirohito
- Preceded by: Shizuo Furukawa
- Succeeded by: Keinoshin Nakamura

Personal details
- Born: Yoshio Komaki; 4 June 1893 Mimata, Miyazaki, Japan
- Died: 31 August 1979 (aged 86)
- Party: Liberal
- Education: Kyoto Imperial University

Yoshio Mochinaga (持永 義夫, Mochinaga Yoshio; 4 June 1893 – 31 August 1979) was a Japanese bureaucrat and politician. A career official of the Home Ministry and later the Ministry of Health and Welfare, he served as Governor of Ehime Prefecture, Mie Prefecture, and Hyōgo Prefecture, as the 28th Director-General of the Hokkaidō Agency, and after the war as a member of the House of Representatives from Miyazaki 2nd district.

== Early life and education ==
Mochinaga was born on 4 June 1893 in Mimata, then in Kitamorokata District, Miyazaki Prefecture. He graduated from Miyazaki Prefectural Normal School in 1913 and from Hiroshima Higher Normal School in 1917, then briefly taught at Kagoshima Prefectural First Middle School before entering the law faculty of Kyoto Imperial University. He graduated in March 1921, entered the Home Ministry in July of the same year, and passed the higher civil service examination that November.

He was born with the surname Komaki and changed his surname to Mochinaga after being adopted into the Mochinaga family in March 1927.

== Career ==
After entering government service, Mochinaga served as a district administrator in Wakayama Prefecture and then as an official in Hiroshima Prefecture before returning to the central bureaucracy. By the 1930s he had advanced through the Social Bureau of the Home Ministry, serving as chief of its welfare, protection, and general-affairs sections.

In 1938 he became a secretary in the Ministry of Health and Welfare and director of operations at the War Wounded Protection Institute. On 15 July 1939 he was appointed Governor of Ehime Prefecture. During his year in office he promoted wartime mobilisation campaigns, drought-relief measures, the expansion of Matsuyama through merger with neighbouring municipalities, and the national transfer of Yuge Merchant Marine School.

On 24 July 1940 Mochinaga left Ehime to return to the central government as Director of the Labor Bureau of the Health and Welfare Ministry, later also heading the Diligence Bureau. In July 1943 he was appointed Governor of Mie Prefecture. The official Mie wartime chronology records his appointment in July 1943 and the accession of his successor in April 1945. During his tenure, the prefecture continued wartime mobilisation, including student labour mobilisation, and experienced the 1944 Tōnankai earthquake.

On 21 April 1945 Mochinaga was transferred to become Governor of Hyōgo Prefecture. The official Hyogo governor list gives his tenure as lasting until 27 October 1945. On that date he became the 28th Director-General of the Hokkaidō Agency. The Hokkaido Government archive gives his term as running from 27 October 1945 to 25 January 1946.

A study of the first postwar gubernatorial elections notes that a large group of wartime governors fell under the occupation purge because of their links to the local structure of the Imperial Rule Assistance Association, and that former governors of prefectures including Hyōgo and Mie were among those affected. After leaving office, Mochinaga worked as a lawyer.

After the purge was lifted, Mochinaga entered electoral politics. He was elected to the House of Representatives from Miyazaki 2nd district at the 1952 Japanese general election as a Liberal Party candidate, and was re-elected at the 1953 Japanese general election. He was defeated at the 1955 Japanese general election.

== Later life ==
Later in life, Mochinaga again worked in public-service and legal roles in Miyazaki. The Miyazaki Prefectural Labour Relations Commission annual report lists him as a lawyer who served as a public-interest member of the commission during its 21st and 22nd terms. He died on 31 August 1979.
