= Kiyoshi Kimura =

Japanese businessman

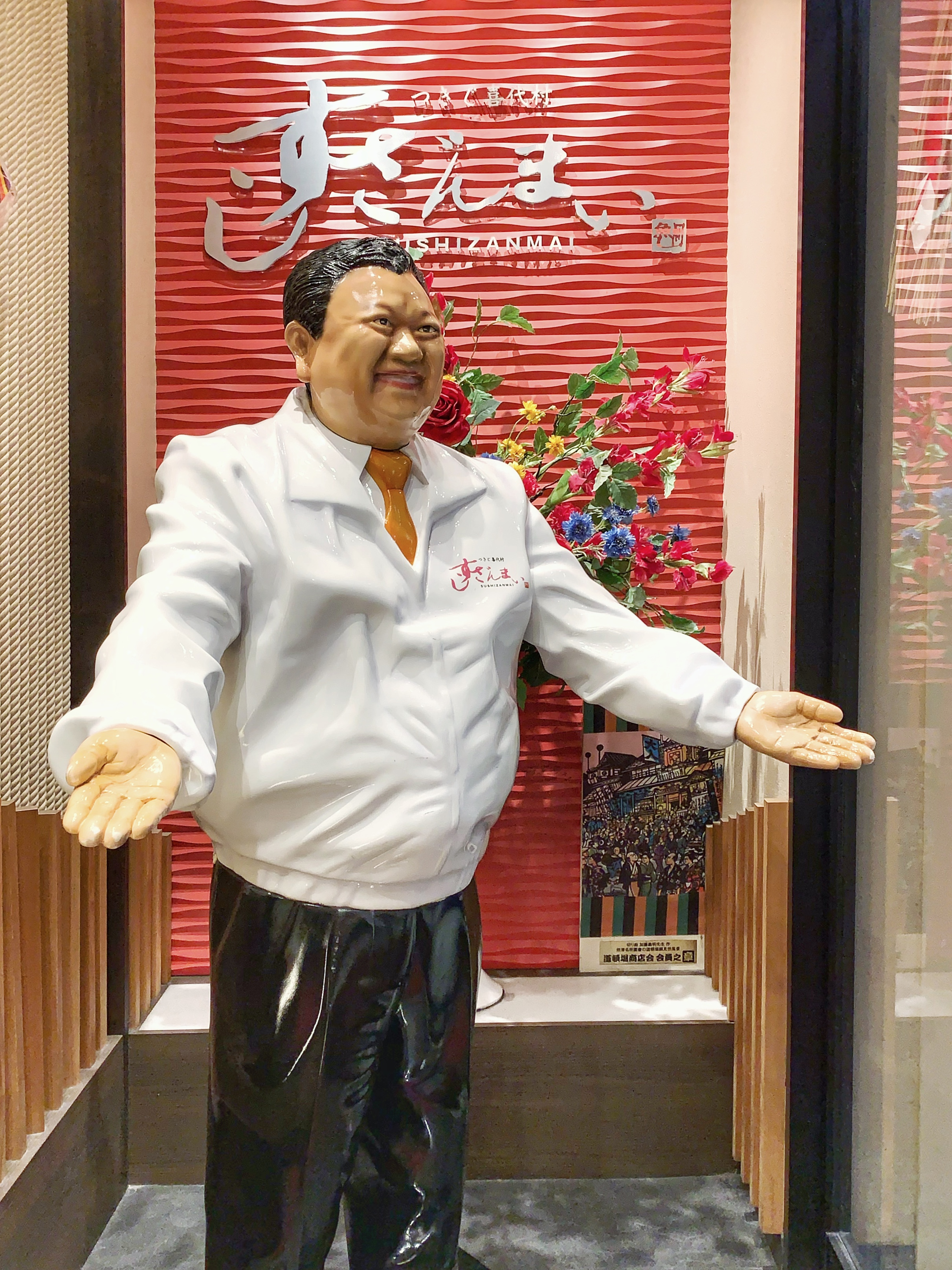
Kiyoshi Kimura's life-sized statue in front of his restaurant Sushi Zanmai, this one in Osaka's Dotonbori

Kiyoshi Kimura (Japanese: 木村 清, romanized: Kimura Kiyoshi; born 19 April 1952) is a Japanese restauranteur known as the "Tuna King" (マグロ大王). Kimura is the head of Kiyomura Corporation which runs the Sushi Zanmai chain of restaurants.

== Tuna auction ==
In January 2019, Kimura paid a record 333.6 million yen for a 278 kg (613 lb) blue fin tuna and has been the highest bidder at the Japanese new year tuna auction in eight out of the past nine years. On January 5, 2026, Kimura again placed the highest bid at the first auction of the New Year at Toyosu Market, purchasing a 243kg bluefin tuna for ¥510.3 million yen (US$3.2 million), setting a new auction record. The fish normally sells for $88/kilogram.
