= Toki Ginjiro =

- 土岐 銀次郎
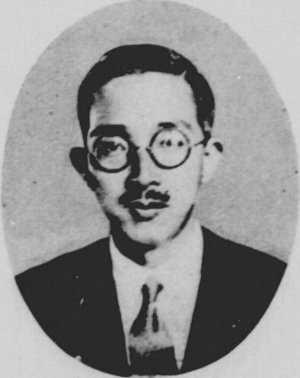

Governor of Saitama Prefecture
- In office 18 April 1938 – 7 January 1941
- Monarch: Hirohito
- Preceded by: Jitsuzō Kawanishi
- Succeeded by: Miyano Shozo

Governor of Toyama Prefecture
- In office 25 May 1935 – 18 April 1938
- Monarch: Hirohito
- Preceded by: Itsuki Saito
- Succeeded by: Yano Kenzo

Personal details
- Born: Miyake Ginjiro; 11 March 1894 Wakayama Prefecture, Japan
- Died: 1 April 1976 (aged 82) Tokyo, Japan
- Party: Independent
- Spouse: Toki Mary
- Children: 3
- Education: Tokyo Imperial University

Toki Ginjiro (Japanese: 土岐銀次郎; 11 March 1894 – 1 April 1976) was Governor of Toyama Prefecture (1935–1938) and Saitama Prefecture (1938–1941). He was the deputy editor of the Tokyo Shimbun, a newspaper published by the Chunichi Shimbun newspaper company. He was a graduate of Tokyo Imperial University.

Preceded by Itsuki Saito	Governor of Toyama Prefecture; 1935–1938	Succeeded by Kenzo Yano
Preceded by Jitsuzo Kawanishi	Governor of Saitama Prefecture; 1938–1941	Succeeded by Miyano Shozo
