= Miyano Shozo =

- 宮野 省三
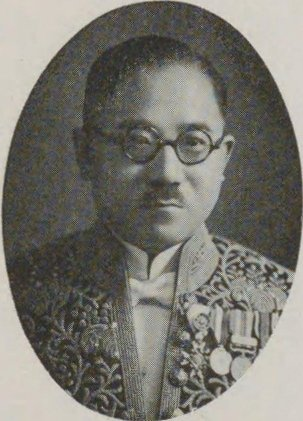

Governor of Saitama Prefecture
- In office 7 January 1941 – 9 January 1942
- Monarch: Hirohito
- Preceded by: Toki Ginjiro
- Succeeded by: Toshio Ōtsu

Governor of Gifu Prefecture
- In office 20 February 1937 – 7 January 1941
- Monarch: Hirohito
- Preceded by: Chiaki Saka
- Succeeded by: Kaneomi Sudō

Personal details
- Born: 28 September 1896 Mie Prefecture, Japan
- Died: 6 December 1972 (aged 76) Setagaya, Tokyo, Japan
- Education: Tokyo Imperial University

Miyano Shozo (宮野 省三, Miyano Shōzō; 28 September 1896 – 6 December 1972) was Governor of Gifu Prefecture (1937–1941) and Saitama Prefecture (1941–1942).

Preceded by Toki Ginjiro	Governor of Saitama Prefecture; 1941–1942	Succeeded by Toshio Ōtsu
